= Wrabness railway station =

Railway station in Essex, England

Wrabness
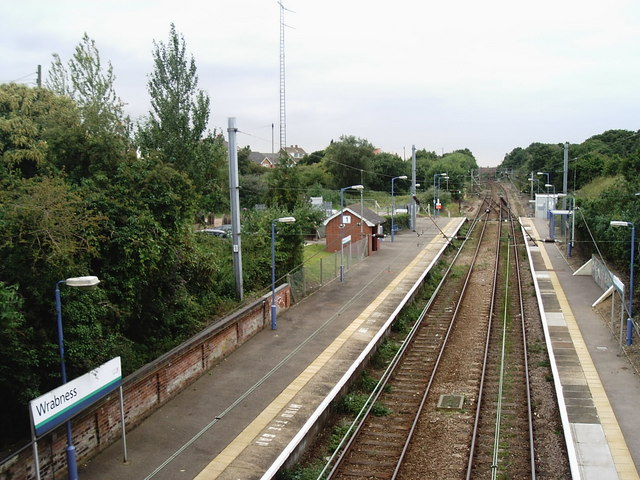

General information
- Location: Wrabness, Tendring; England
- Coordinates: 51.939°N 1.172°E
- Grid reference: TM180315
- Manager: Greater Anglia
- Platforms: 2

Other information
- Station code: WRB
- Classification: DfT category F1

Passengers
- 2021/22: ▲17,280
- 2022/23: ▲20,006
- 2023/24: ▲23,178
- 2024/25: ▲26,698
- 2025/26: ▲27,156
Location
Notes
- Passenger statistics from the Office of Rail and Road

Wrabness railway station is on the Mayflower Line, a branch of the Great Eastern Main Line in the East of England, serving the village of Wrabness, Essex. It is 65 miles 6 chains (104.73 km) down the line from London Liverpool Street and is situated between Mistley to the west and Harwich International station to the east. Its three-letter station code is WRB.

The station is currently managed by Greater Anglia, which also operates all trains serving the station.

== History ==
The station opened on 15 August 1854. Platform 1 (London bound) and platform 2 (Harwich bound) have an operational length for four-coach trains. There were formerly sidings at the west (London) end of both the "up" and "down" lines. Those on the up side were used for local goods work, coal being one of the commodities handled. The sidings on the down side were extended during World War II to the riverside to accommodate a large rail-mounted gun which was intended to protect the estuary.

The signal box controlling the section of line stood at the west end of the down platform but was no longer used after the electrification of the line in 1985. Electrification also meant the station building on Platform 1 was demolished, also in 1985. The box was purchased by local enthusiasts and donated to the Colne Valley Railway at Castle Hedingham where it was re-commissioned and is operational today controlling a running round loop.

== Services ==
As of December 2015 the typical weekday off-peak service on the line is one train per hour in each direction, although some additional services run at peak times. Trains operate between Harwich Town and Manningtree calling at all stations, although some are extended to or from Colchester or London Liverpool Street. There is also one direct train a day on Monday to Fridays from Wrabness to Ipswich (continuing on to Cambridge) during the morning peak.

Preceding station	National Rail	Following station
Mistley	Greater Anglia Mayflower Line	Harwich International
Historical railways
Bradfield Line open, station closed	Great Eastern Railway Eastern Union Railway	Harwich International Line and station open
