= Mistley railway station =

Railway station in Essex, England

Coordinates: 51.944°N 1.081°E

Mistley
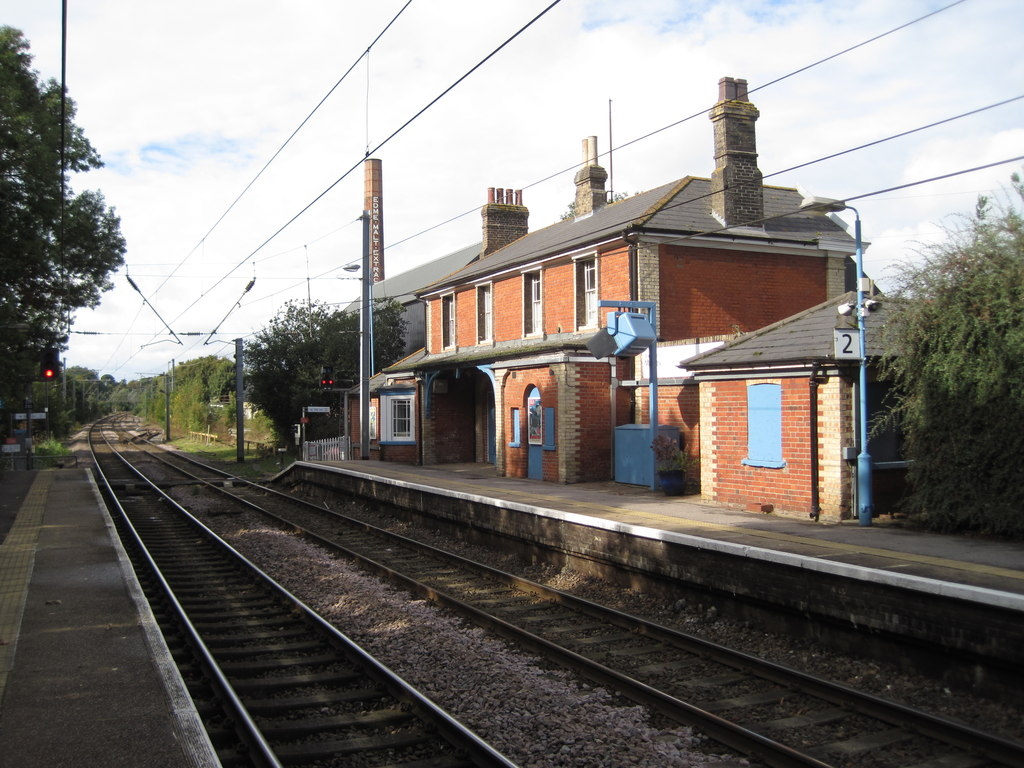
- The station in October 2012

General information
- Location: Mistley, Tendring; England
- Grid reference: TM118317
- Manager: Greater Anglia
- Platforms: 2

Other information
- Station code: MIS
- Classification: DfT category F1

History
- Opened: 15 August 1854

Passengers
- 2020/21: ▼14,418
- 2021/22: ▲36,520
- 2022/23: ▲47,958
- 2023/24: ▲54,074
- 2024/25: ▲63,776
Location
Notes
- Passenger statistics from the Office of Rail and Road

Mistley railway station is on the Mayflower Line, a branch of the Great Eastern Main Line in the East of England, serving the village of Mistley, Essex. It is 61 miles 14 chains (98.45 km) down the line from London Liverpool Street and is situated between Manningtree to the west and Wrabness to the east. Its three-letter station code is MIS.

The station was opened by the Eastern Union Railway in 1854. It is managed by Greater Anglia, which also operates all trains serving the station.

== History ==
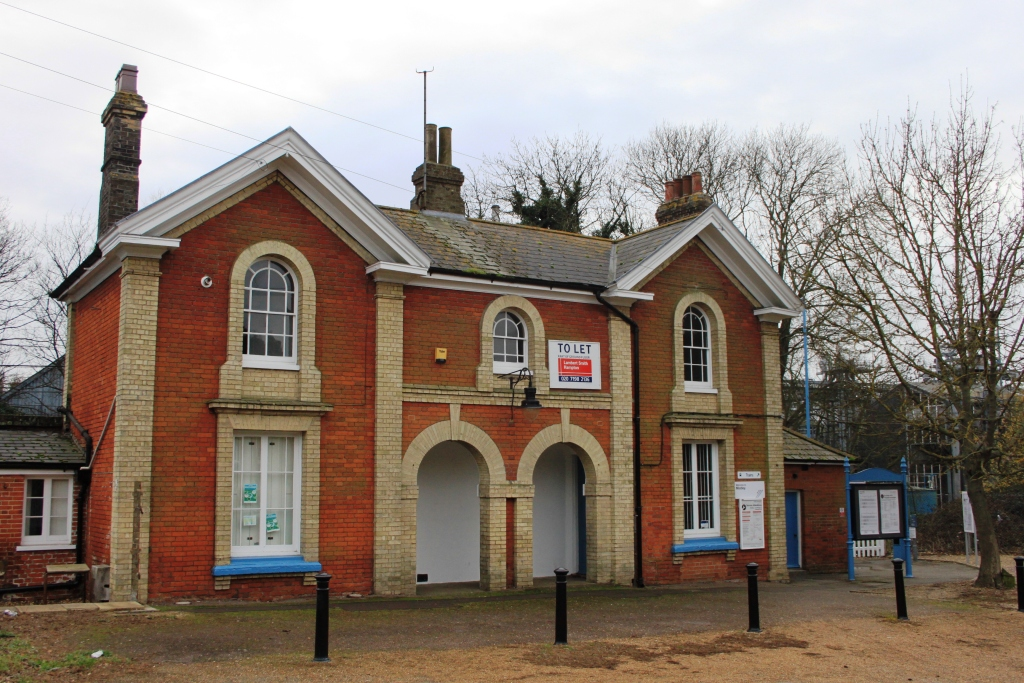
The station building is Grade II listed. Photo taken in December 2011

Mistley was opened by the Eastern Union Railway in 1854 and the brick-built two-storey Italianate station building (now in alternative use) was probably designed by Frederick Barnes. The building is Grade II listed.

Platform 1 (London bound) and platform 2 (Harwich bound) have an operational length for four-coach trains. There is a siding on the "up" (London-bound) side at the country (east) end which earlier had additionally included a long curved incline which allowed goods movements down to the quayside using horsepower. This was later replaced by a spur with a much steeper incline down to the quays on the downside at the country end. At the London (west) end of the "down" side there are several sidings which were for movements to and from the malt works.

There was a signal box at the London end of the "down" platform which having been taken out of service on the introduction of multiple aspect signalling in September 1985, was not allowed to be demolished as it was in a conservation area, so it was offered by Tendring Council and British Railways to the East Anglian Railway Museum at Chappel & Wakes Colne, to where it was moved in November 1985 and installed on to a brick base and today is again fully operational.

== Services ==
As of December 2015 the typical weekday off-peak service on the line is one train per hour in each direction, although some additional services run at peak times. Trains operate between Harwich Town and Manningtree, calling at all stations, although some are extended to or from Colchester and/or London Liverpool Street. There is also one direct train a day on Monday to Friday from Mistley to Ipswich (continuing on to Cambridge) during the morning peak, which is operated by a diesel unit.

Preceding station	National Rail	Following station
Manningtree	Greater Anglia Mayflower Line	Wrabness
Historical railways
Manningtree Line and station open	Great Eastern Railway Eastern Union Railway	Bradfield Line open, station closed
