= Ardleigh =

Village in Essex, England

Coordinates: 51.9269°N 0.9831°E

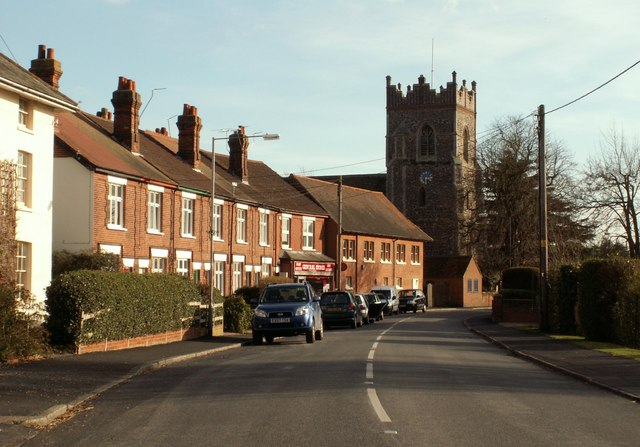
- The Street, Ardleigh, with the parish church of St Mary The Virgin and the post office in the background.

- Location within Essex
- Population: 2,758 (Parish, 2021)
- OS grid reference: TM052295
  - London: 55 mi (89 km) NE
- Civil parish: Ardleigh
- District: Tendring
- Shire county: Essex
- Region: East
- Country: England
- Sovereign state: United Kingdom
- Post town: COLCHESTER
- Postcode district: CO7
- Dialling code: 01206
- Police: Essex
- Fire: Essex
- Ambulance: East of England
- UK Parliament: Harwich and North Essex

Ardleigh /ˈɑːrdli/ is a village and civil parish in the Tendring district of Essex, England. It is situated approximately 4 miles (6 km) northeast from the centre of Colchester and 26 miles (42 km) northeast from the county town of Chelmsford. At the 2021 census the parish had a population of 2,758.

== History ==
Ardleigh appears in Domesday Book of 1086, when it is described as a holding of Geoffrey de Mandeville.

The area includes a number of smallholdings founded after the First World War by the Land Settlement Association. Though the Great Eastern Main Line passes close to the village, the railway station closed in November 1967.

== Transport and geography ==
The closest railway station is Manningtree, 3 miles (5 km) northeast. The village is on the A137 road, a route from Colchester to Ipswich, Suffolk. Ardleigh Reservoir is less than 1 mile (1.6 km) to the southwest. The parish includes Crockleford Heath.

== Governance ==
Ardleigh is in the district of Tendring and the parliamentary constituency of Harwich and North Essex. The village has its own Parish Council. It is part of the electoral ward called Ardleigh and Little Bromley.
