= Needham Market railway station =

Railway station in Suffolk, England

Coordinates: 52.1526°N 1.0554°E

Needham Market
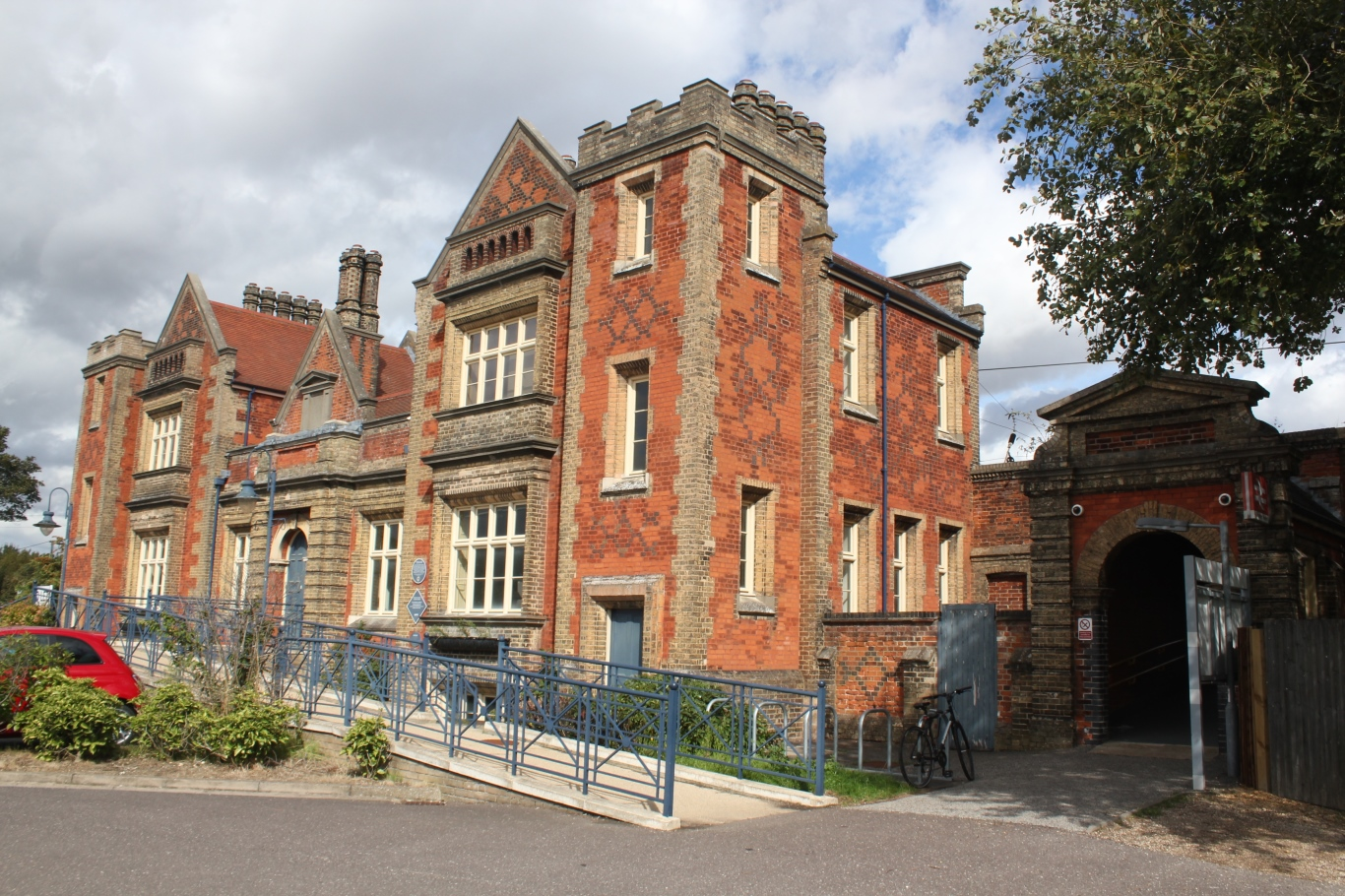

General information
- Location: Needham Market, Mid Suffolk; England
- Grid reference: TM091548
- Managed by: Abellio Greater Anglia
- Platforms: 2

Other information
- Station code: NMT
- Classification: DfT category F2

Key dates
- 1846: Opened as Needham
- 2 January 1967: Closed
- 6 December 1971: Reopened as Needham Market

Passengers
- 2020/21: ▼33,484
- 2021/22: ▲79,196
- 2022/23: ▲94,148
- 2023/24: ▲112,342
- 2024/25: ▲129,588
Location
Notes
- Passenger statistics from the Office of Rail and Road

Needham Market railway station is on the Great Eastern Main Line (GEML) in the East of England, serving the town of Needham Market, Suffolk. It is 77 miles 7 chains (124.1 km) down the line from London Liverpool Street and is situated between Ipswich to the south and Stowmarket to the north. Its three-letter station code is NMT.

The station is currently operated by Greater Anglia, which also runs all passenger trains serving the station. It is served by one train per hour between Ipswich and Cambridge. It is the only station on the GEML with no direct services to London, with passengers instead having to change at Ipswich.

The station appears in Britain's 100 Best Railway Stations by Simon Jenkins.

== History ==
The station was originally opened as Needham by the Ipswich & Bury Railway in 1846. The main building, described as "one of the best in East Anglia" by Biddle, was designed in a grand Jacobean style with decorative brickwork by Frederick Barnes and was completed by the contractor, Daniel Revitt, in 1849. It was later slightly simplified, and the platforms rebuilt, by the London and North Eastern Railway (LNER).

The station was closed by the Eastern Region of British Railways in 1967 but reopened as Needham Market in 1971. The main building, now in alternative use, is a Grade II listed building. It was restored in 2000 by Spacia Ltd and won an award in the 2002 National Railway Heritage Awards. In April 2015, work commenced to improve the station, including the installation of an anti-slip composite fibreglass platform (Dura Platform) which features a patented design with in-built water management and snow-melting capabilities. However, this did not include making the southbound platform wheelchair accessible.

== Services ==
The following services typically call at Needham Market:

Operator	Route	Rolling stock	Frequency
Greater Anglia	Cambridge - Dullingham - Newmarket - Kennett - Bury St. Edmunds - Thurston - Elmswell - Stowmarket - Needham Market - Ipswich	Class 755	1x per hour

Preceding station	National Rail	Following station
Ipswich	Greater Anglia Ipswich to Ely Line	Stowmarket
Historical railways
Claydon	Great Eastern Railway Eastern Union Railway	Stowmarket
