= Dovercourt railway station =

Railway station in Essex, England

Dovercourt
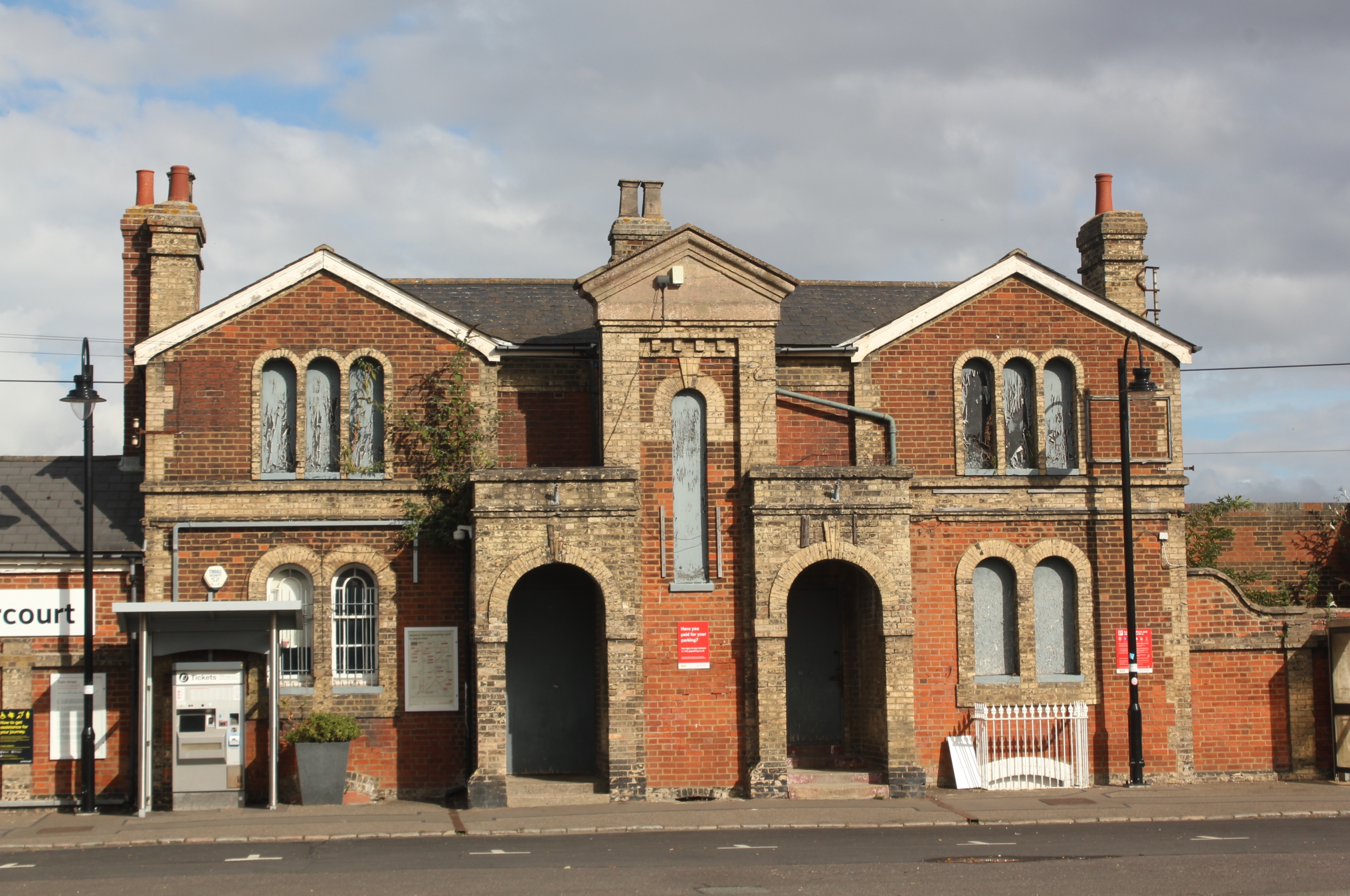

General information
- Location: Dovercourt, Tendring; England
- Coordinates: 51.939°N 1.281°E
- Grid reference: TM255317
- Managed by: Greater Anglia
- Platforms: 1

Other information
- Station code: DVC
- Classification: DfT category E

History
- Original company: Eastern Union Railway
- Pre-grouping: Great Eastern Railway
- Post-grouping: London and North Eastern Railway

Key dates
- 15 August 1854: Opened as Dovercourt
- 1 May 1913: Renamed Dovercourt Bay
- 14 December 1972: Renamed Dovercourt

Passengers
- 2020/21: ▼46,460
- 2021/22: ▲0.118 million
- 2022/23: ▲0.130 million
- 2023/24: ▲0.149 million
- 2024/25: ▲0.168 million
Location
Notes
- Passenger statistics from the Office of Rail and Road

Dovercourt railway station is on the Mayflower Line, a branch of the Great Eastern Main Line, in the East of England, serving the seaside town of Dovercourt, Essex. It is 70 miles (112.65 km) from London Liverpool Street and is situated between Harwich International to the west and Harwich Town to the east. Its three-letter station code is DVC.

The station is currently operated by Greater Anglia, which also runs all trains serving the station.

== History ==
The station was opened by the Eastern Union Railway on 15 August 1854 and was originally named Dovercourt. Its name was changed to Dovercourt Bay on 1 May 1913, but reverted to Dovercourt on 14 December 1972.

Today passenger operations are confined to a bi-directional single electrified track, using what was the "up" track in the days when services through the station were operated on both tracks by steam and diesel locomotives. The unnumbered platform has an operational length for eight-coach trains. The remains of what was the "down" platform survive. The down platform also had a rather sizeable canopy, which was of little benefit given that most use of the platform was by passengers arriving. The bridge that linked the two platforms has since been removed. The only station beyond Dovercourt on the down side is Harwich Town, which is a relatively short walking distance. The station also had a signal box which was positioned at the west (London) end of the down platform; it controlled the occasional goods movements to short sidings at both ends of the up platform, which were used for coal and other goods deliveries to the town.

== Services ==
As of December 2015 the typical weekday off-peak service on the line is one train per hour in each direction, although some additional services run at peak times. Trains operate between Harwich Town and Manningtree calling at all stations, although some are extended to or from Colchester and/or London Liverpool Street.

Preceding station	National Rail	Following station
Harwich International	Greater Anglia Mayflower Line	Harwich Town
