= Harwich International railway station =

Railway station in Essex, England

Harwich International
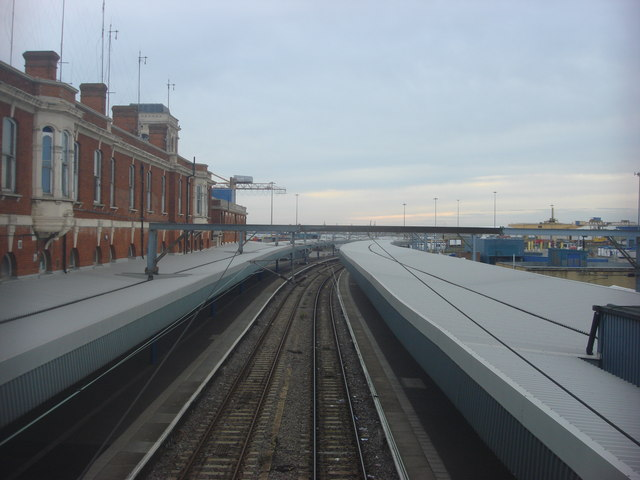

General information
- Location: Parkeston, Tendring, England
- Coordinates: 51.947°N 1.255°E
- Grid reference: TM238326
- Managed by: Greater Anglia
- Platforms: 3

Other information
- Station code: HPQ
- Classification: DfT category E

Key dates
- 1883: Opened as Harwich Parkeston Quay
- 1995: Renamed Harwich International

Passengers
- 2020/21: ▼33,030
- 2021/22: ▲74,476
- 2022/23: ▲95,228
- 2023/24: ▲103,856
- 2024/25: ▲117,528
- Interchange: 3
Location
Notes
- Passenger statistics from the Office of Rail and Road

Harwich International is a railway station on the Mayflower Line, a branch of the Great Eastern Main Line; it serves Harwich International Port, in Essex, England. It lies 68 miles 72 chains (68.9 mi; 110.9 km) from London Liverpool Street, between Wrabness to the west and Dovercourt to the east. Its three-letter station code, HPQ, derives from its original name, Harwich Parkeston Quay. The station is operated by Greater Anglia, which also runs all trains serving the station. It is the eastern terminus in England of the Dutchflyer service between London and Amsterdam.

== History ==
Early postcard of the platform

The Manningtree to Harwich branch was opened as a single track line on 15 August 1854 and the original route passed south of the Parkeston Quay site. During the 1860s and 1870s, passenger and goods traffic grew at Harwich but so did complaints about noise, smell and cattle lairages in the centre of town. Additionally, ship passengers faced a long walk between Harwich station and the ships.

The port and station at Parkeston owe their origins to the Great Eastern Railway (GER), which opened them on a new track alignment built over reclaimed land in September 1882; they were named after its chairman, Charles Henry Parkes. The single-tracked branch was doubled at the same time and diverted to the north of its original alignment. (Note: The original alignment of the branch can still be followed on Ordnance Survey maps of the area.)

The original combined station building and hotel is still extant, although the latter is now converted for office use and is part of the port terminal.

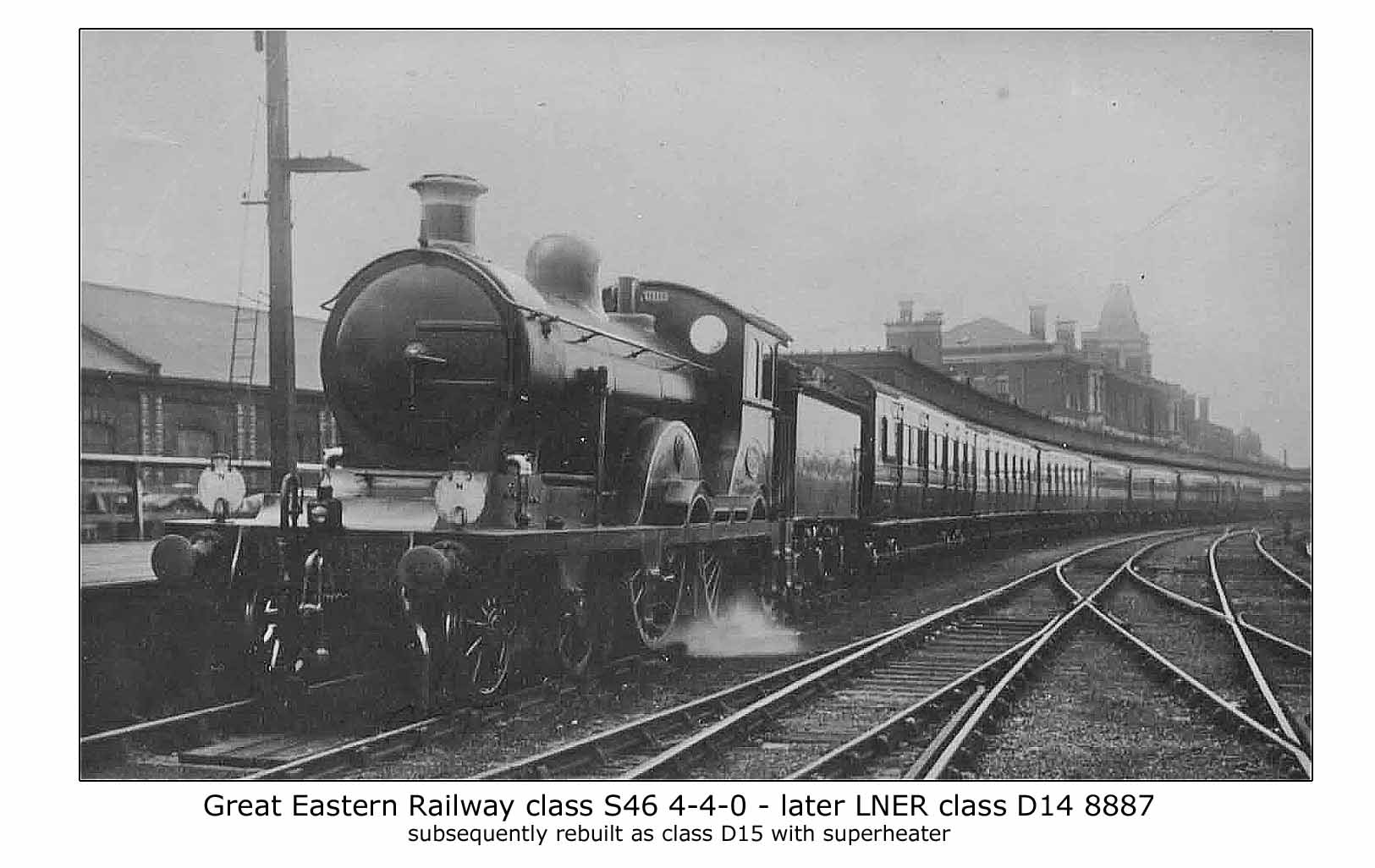
GER S48 class (later LNER D15) no. 8887 at Parkeston Quay

When opened, the station consisted of two through-platforms serving the then double-tracked line to Harwich Town. This was supplemented by a bay platform at the eastern end of the main platform (the present-day platform 1), which handled Harwich to Parkeston local services; in the days of steam, these generally consisted of a J15, and later N2 or N7 tank engines, and up to four carriages. This service was timed to suit shift times both on the quay and in adjoining offices, the majority of workers being railway employees.

The bay also had a loop allowing the running round of the locomotive. The main platform was, and still is, of sufficient length to accommodate a boat train of 10 or 11 coaches. The up (westbound) through-platform was shorter, but this did not prevent it being used by the North Country boat train in the morning, which consisted of 11 or 12 carriages, and would overhang the end of the platform considerably at the eastern end of the station.

The Manningtree to Harwich local service used the last third of the main platform using a third central access line, which joined the platform at that point allowing a ticket barrier to be used for that part of the platform exclusively. This arrangement allowed a five- or six-coach train to sit at the western end of that platform without the need for any shunting, whereas a full boat train would have to shunt temporarily towards the west to allow the local train access.

=== London & North Eastern Railway (1923–1947) ===
Following an extension of the maritime quay westward, Parkeston Quay West was opened in 1932 and was constructed on a wooden pier. The land in between the pier and the riverbank was later reclaimed.

During the early years, foot passengers would alight at Parkeston Quay station and walk through to the quay. The construction of Parkeston Quay West enabled trains to deliver the passengers to the quayside, removing passengers from the actual quayside and offering an improved interchange. The station consisted of a single platform and was capable of handling a 10- or 11-coach boat train. It serviced the day service to the Hoek van Holland Haven (Hook of Holland Harbour).

This also saw an extension to the yard and the signalling was upgraded in this area during 1931/32. In 1934, the name Harwich was added to the main station name, making it Harwich Parkeston Quay.

Harwich and Parkeston was a base for Royal Navy destroyers and other craft during World War II. Military personnel and munitions were handled by the railway facilities during this time.

=== British Railways (1948–1994) ===
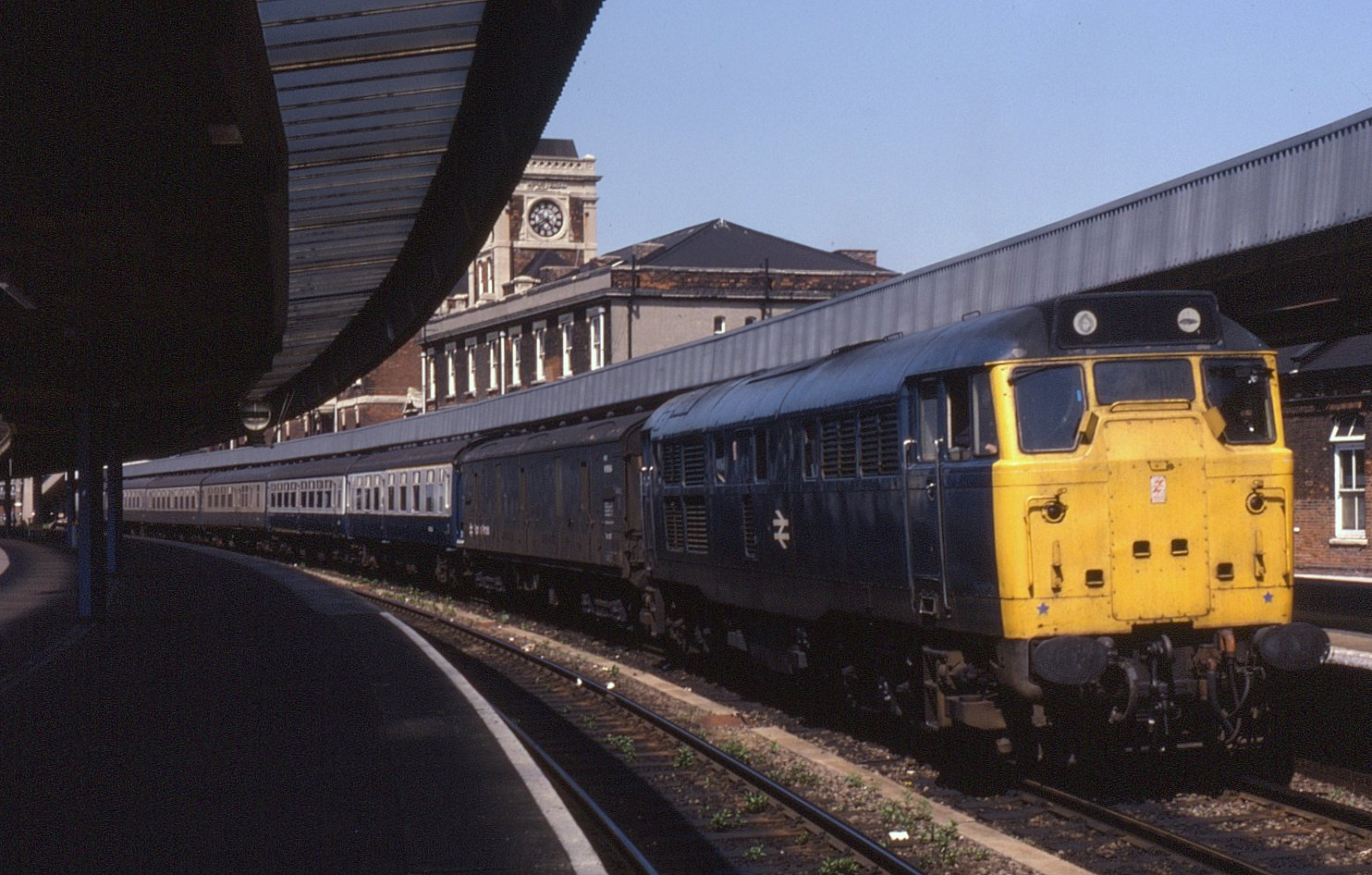
A Class 31 locomotive at the station, heading a boat train, 1982

In 1948, following nationalisation, the line became part of British Railways Eastern Region.

After World War II, Harwich became a major route for troops to Europe during the Cold War. Parkeston Quay was the base port for three troop ships serving the British Army of the Rhine operation in Germany, via the Hook of Holland. The vessels initially employed were the Vienna, Empire Parkeston and Empire Wansbeck. In the 1960s, Ro-Ro ferries started operating and the three ships were retired.

The Thompson B1 class 4-6-0 class worked many of the other longer distance trains and at the time.

On the evening of 31 January 1953, the North Sea flood of 1953 affected the area, with 200 yards (180 m) of main line embankment washed away; damage to the decking of the quays was also recorded. The line towards Manningtree was reopened on 5 February and to Harwich, where there had been further damage, on 23 February.

From 21 May 1968, the two lines between Harwich Parkeston Quay and Harwich Town were operated as two single lines; the former up line was for passenger services and the formers down line for freight.

By the late 1970s, the costs of running the dated mechanical signalling systems north of Colchester was recognised; in 1978, a scheme for track rationalisation and resignalling was duly submitted to the Department of Transport. This was followed by a proposal to electrify the Great Eastern Main Line north of Colchester and branch to Harwich in 1980. Electrification work was undertaken in the early–mid 1980s.

Parkeston Quay West closed in 1972, with all traffic using the main station. A new two-storey passenger terminal was built next to the station building. The 1970s also saw platform realignment and new canopies installed.

The station continued to have diesel locomotive-hauled InterCity services running to London Liverpool Street, Manchester Piccadilly and Glasgow Central, via Ipswich, Bury St Edmunds, Ely and Peterborough.

In 1982, British Rail sectorised their operations and the branch line moved under the London & South East sector, which was renamed Network SouthEast in 1986.

On 14 April 1985, the first electric train consisting of two Class 308 electric multiple units (EMUs) worked the line, although another member of the class had been dragged from Ipswich to Parkeston the previous year and used for crew training. The following day, a Class 86 electric locomotive visited the branch to test sidings and crossings on the line. The full electric service was introduced on 12 May 1985, with Class 86s hauling the InterCity boat trains to/from Liverpool Street and EMUs working local services.

=== Privatisation era (1994–present day) ===
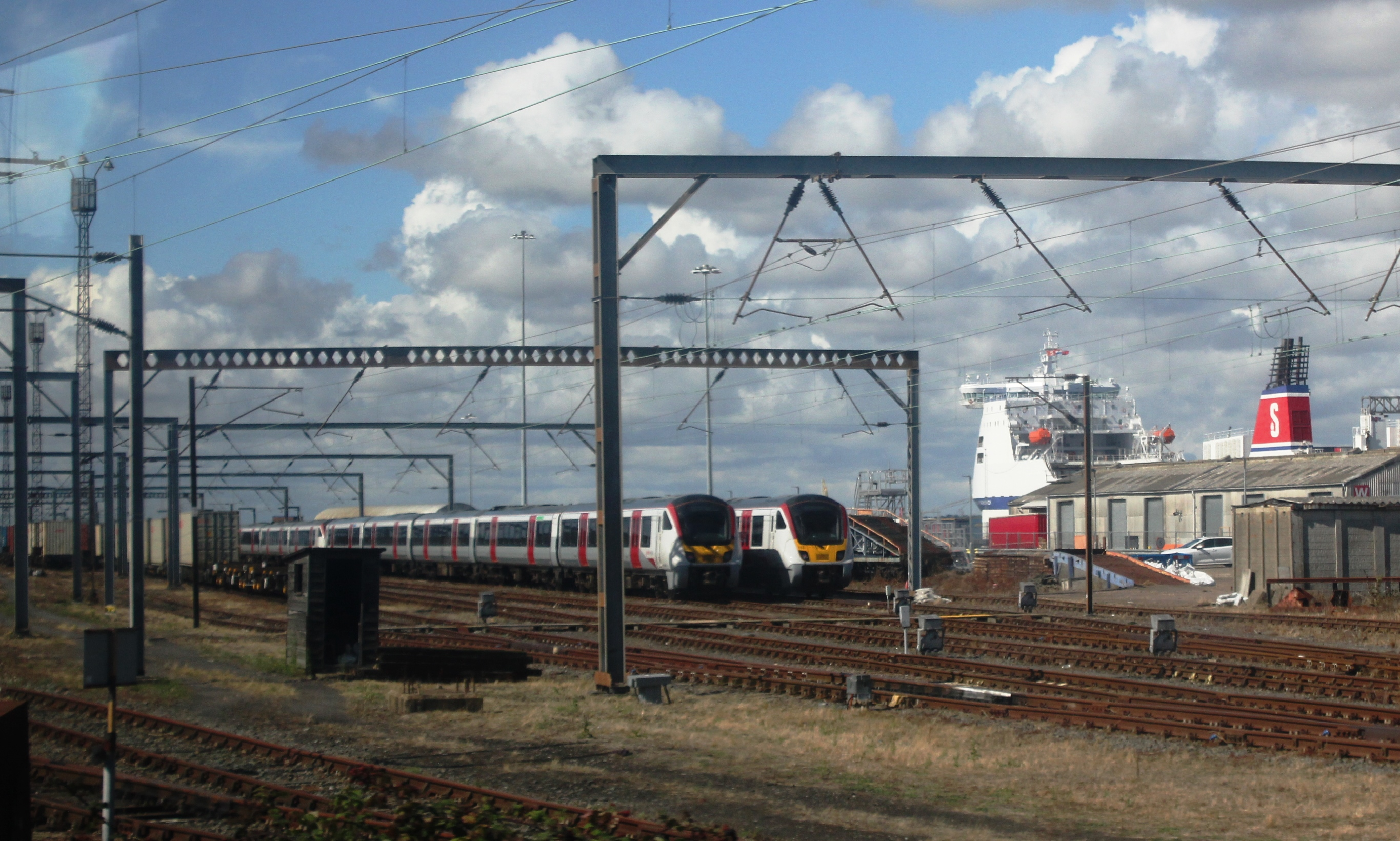
Two Greater Anglia Class 720s at Parkeston Quay Yard, with a ship at the quay

In April 1994, Railtrack became responsible for the maintenance of the infrastructure; it was succeeded by Network Rail in 2002.

Passenger services have been operated by the following franchises:

- April 1994 to December 1996: Operated as a non-privatised business unit under the InterCity brand name
- January 1997 to March 2004: Anglia Railways was owned by GB Railways, but was bought out by FirstGroup in 2003
- April 2004 to February 2012: National Express East Anglia
- March 2013 to September 2025: Abellio Greater Anglia Abellio's UK operations were bought out in 2022.
- September 2025 to present: Greater Anglia

On 27 May 1995, the station name was changed to Harwich International Port, although the port suffix was dropped shortly thereafter.

The line was given the marketing name the Mayflower line in September 1997, with a ceremony held at Mistley in the presence of local MP Ivan Henderson.

== Boat Train operation ==
Boat trains commenced running to Harwich Parkeston Quay in 1882 and were timed at 1 hour 45 minutes from London Liverpool Street; by 1895, this was down to 1 hour 30 minutes. In 1897, the 8:30pm train was run as two separate trains: 8:30pm for the Hook of Holland Harbour and 8:35pm for Antwerp. With the introduction of corridor restaurant cars in 1904, the time was eased to 1 hour 27 minutes, but the introduction of the large Great Eastern 1500 class 4-6-0 engines in 1912 saw a running time of 1 hour 22 minutes.

In the early days, there were boat trains to Liverpool Street but, in 1885, the first train operated via Ipswich to Doncaster which paved the way for over a century of trains linking Parkeston Quay to the Midlands and the North.

The North Country Continental operated between Harwich and Manchester Piccadilly, usually being routed via March and the Great Northern and Great Eastern Joint Railway route.

This train included the first restaurant car on the Great Eastern (in 1891) and this was also the first service in the UK to allow third-class passengers to dine. A new train set was built for this service in 1906. (Note: The train set generally operated in the following formation: "ENGINE+THIRD CLASS BRAKE+CORRIDOR THIRD+OPEN THIRD+KITCHEN AND OPEN FIRST+SEMI-OPEN FIRST+SIX WHEEL BRAKE (this constituted the York portion). Then followed various corridor composite brakes followed each detached from the rear of the northbound train en route. These were for LIVERPOOL (detached Doncaster on the outward journey)+ LIVERPOOL + MANCHESTER (detached at Lincoln and routed via the Great Central routes) + BIRMINGHAM (via Midland Railway routes) + BIRMINGHAM (via London and North Western routes)(both of which were detached at March).)

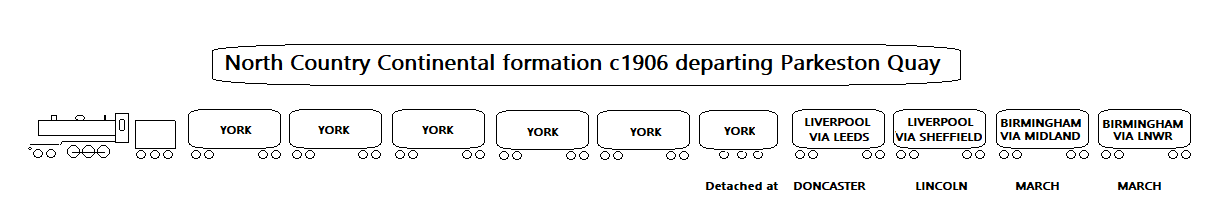
Carriage formation of the North Country Continental service from Parkeston Quay to several locations, c.1907

Other named boat trains included The Scandinavian, which connected to the Esjberg ferry, the Antwerp Continental, the Night Hook and the Flushing Continental.

Larger GER steam locomotives such as the Claud Hamilton 4-4-0s and GER Class S69 4-6-0s which remained the staple locomotive employed on boat train services throughout LNER days.

The LNER introduced the LNER Class B17 4-6-0 locomotives to the GER and these saw work on the boat trains as did the Thompson designed LNER Class B1 4-6-0s.

During World War II, boat train services were suspended. In the 1950s, Britannia Class locomotives allocated to Stratford engine shed worked the Liverpool boat trains, although these were usually worked by Parkeston crews. Steam power disappeared from East Anglia in 1962 and boat train working was taken over by Classes 31, 37 and 47 diesel locomotives.

Electrification of the Harwich branch in 1985 saw Liverpool Street trains worked by Class 86 electric locomotives and later Class 90s. In 1986, the North Country Continental was renamed The European and was diverted via the electrified North London Line and West Coast Main Line route to Glasgow Central for Class 86 operation; the train on the traditional route was now known as The Rheinlander. The Manchester service remained in the hands of the Class 47s, until the end of locomotive-hauled trains in May 1988 and the cutting back of services to Peterborough in May 1994. With the introduction of Sprinter diesel multiple units, this was changed to The Lorelei from Parkeston Quay to Liverpool Lime Street, with a unit for Birmingham New Street detaching at Peterborough. The return working from Liverpool was named the Vincent van Gogh.

The Liverpool Street boat trains also declined as passenger trends changed and, as of 2024, there are no dedicated boat trains except for specials servicing cruise vessels.

== Railway facilities ==
=== Parkeston (village) ===
The village of Parkeston was created in the 1880s for railway and quay staff.

=== Parkeston Yard ===
The extensive marshalling yard to the west of the main station provided stabling for the carriage sets, which were used on the boat trains and local services, the large numbers of lorries used for servicing Parkeston Quay, and the huge throughput of export and import wagons which were shipped via the train ferry service from Harwich Town. Cargoes were assembled at Parkeston and brought to Harwich for a specific sailing, as there was no long-term storage capacity at the ferry terminal. Import wagons were subject to customs clearance at Parkeston and delays could at times be considerable on individual wagons, with cargoes having arrived from various European origins.

The type of wagon passing through the marshalling yard changed towards the end of the century, as container or freightliner flats and car flats replaced ferry wagons.

In 2024, there is little regular freight at this site and passenger stock stables overnight having arrived off Liverpool Street services. These generally form early morning and peak-hour services back to London.

=== Parkeston Engine Shed ===
In the 1870s, the building of Parkeston Quay had started and land to the east of that site was allocated for the new engine shed, which opened in March 1883. The shed was a four-road brick-built straight-shed, with an outdoor turntable located between the shed and running lines. Access to the shed was from the Harwich direction and the shed was provided with coaling and watering facilities.

In the 1890s, the shed was equipped to deal with some repairs, although these were generally undertaken at Ipswich engine shed further down the line.

A new, larger turntable was provided on the site in 1912 and this was installed in time for the delivery of the 1500 class 4-6-0 locomotives, the first of which was allocated to Parkeston. It is probably about this time that access to the shed was improved with a link from the east end of Parkeston Quay station supplementing the existing access.

The shed was part of the Ipswich district, which was referred to as the Eastern district after 1915.

By the end of the Great Eastern Railway era, the following locomotives were allocated to Parkeston:

Class (LNER classification)	Wheel arrangement	Number allocated
B12	4-6-0	22
D13	4-4-0	5
D14	4-4-0	3
D15	4-4-0	16
E4	2-4-0	14
F3	2-4-2T	9
F4	2-4-2T	1
F5	2-4-2T	2
J14	0-6-0	1
J15	0-6-0	32
J65	0-6-0T	5
J66	0-6-0T	7
J67	0-6-0T	4
J69	0-6-0T	3
J70	0-6-0T Tram	7

In 1930, improved coal facilities were introduced along with a water softening plant in 1935. The shed was reroofed in 1950.

By the mid- to late-1950s, the number of steam locomotives had declined. Ian Allan's Locoshed Book listed just 24 on 11 May 1957: nine B1s, nine J39s, three J15s, one J68 and two N7s. The numbers of shunting and tank engines had been reduced by the arrival of diesel-powered locomotives and diesel multiple units had begun to work local services. There were still 33 units allocated overall to the shed in 1959 but, by 1967, the facility had been closed and demolished.

=== Parkeston Freightliner Terminal ===
The demolition of the locomotive shed allowed the construction of the new Freightliner terminal on the site, which opened on 21 May 1968. The Seafreightliner service operated two sailings per day to Zeebrugge and one sailing per day to Rotterdam, the latter in a joint service with its Dutch counterparts.

The freightliner terminal was closed on 29 April 1994. As of 2024, the terminal is out of use although it is hoped that traffic may return in the future. Rail capacity to Felixstowe, on the other side of the estuary, is limited by sections of single line which is currently (2025) at capacity. This may see freightliner traffic return to Parkeston one day.

=== Signalling ===
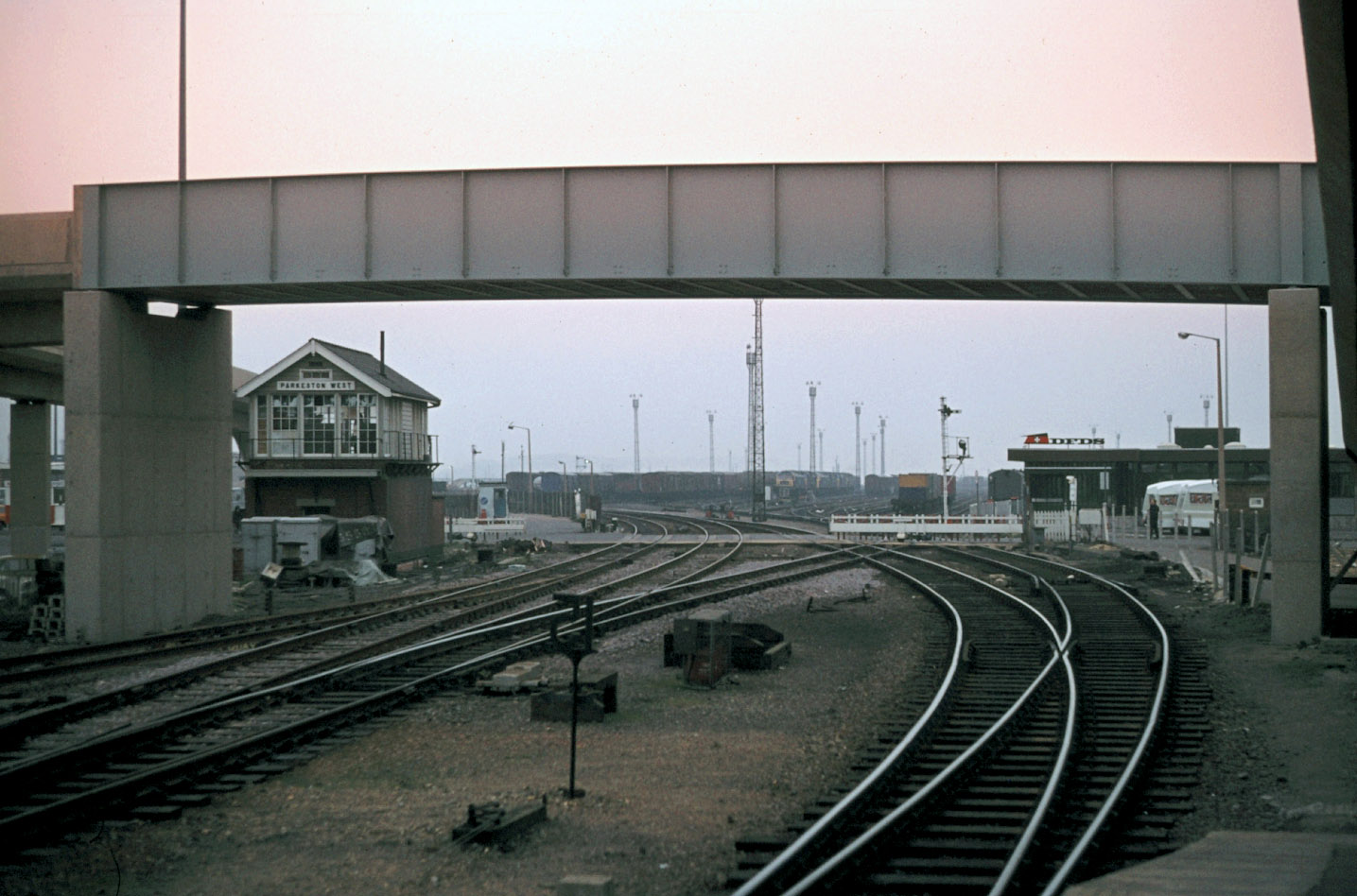
Parkeston West Signal Box

The area was controlled by three signal boxes using semaphore signalling; from west to east, these were:

- Parkeston Goods Junction - this controlled access to the yards and to Parkeston West station from 1932. The first box opened in 1882 and closed in 1934, when a larger box was provided. This box closed on 1 December 1985.
- Parkeston West - this controlled the west end of Parkeston Quay station and the east end of Parkeston Yard. Dates were similar to Parkeston Goods Junction above.
- Parkeston East - this controlled access to the east off the station and the engine shed. Opened in 1882, it was closed in November 1973.

In 1985, signalling was replaced by more modern automatic signals and was controlled from an NX Panel, located on the site of Parkeston West SB.

== Layout ==
The station has two entrances:

- One is located on the ground floor of the passenger terminal building, which houses a ticket machine, and provides step free direct access to platform 1, and indirect access to platforms 2 and 3 via a footbridge
- The second entrance is from a car-park, via the footbridge, with step free access being provided by a lift which is in service until the evening ferry sailing to Hook of Holland has departed. The platforms can also be accessed via a level crossing at the eastern end of the platforms.

Platforms are typically used as follows:

1. the terminus of Dutchflyer trains towards London
2. bi-directional and is served by local Mayflower Line services between Manningtree and Harwich Town
3. services for Lowestoft and Cambridge.

The platforms have an operational length for 13-coach trains.

== Services ==
Greater Anglia operates the following typical daily service on the line:

- 1 tph to Harwich Town
- 1 tph to Manningtree; of which:
  - 2 tpd continue to Colchester
- 4 tpd to London Liverpool Street
- 1 tpd to Cambridge, via Ipswich
- 1 tpd to Lowestoft, via Ipswich.

Preceding station	National Rail	Following station
Wrabness	Greater Anglia Mayflower line	Dovercourt
Ipswich	Greater Anglia Cambridge/Lowestoft Limited service	Terminus
	Ferry services	
Terminus	Stena Line; Harwich–Hoek van Holland	Hoek van Holland Haven
Terminus	Stena Line; Dutchflyer	Hoek van Holland Haven
