= Manningtree railway station =

Railway station in Essex, England

Coordinates: 51.949°N 1.045°E

Manningtree
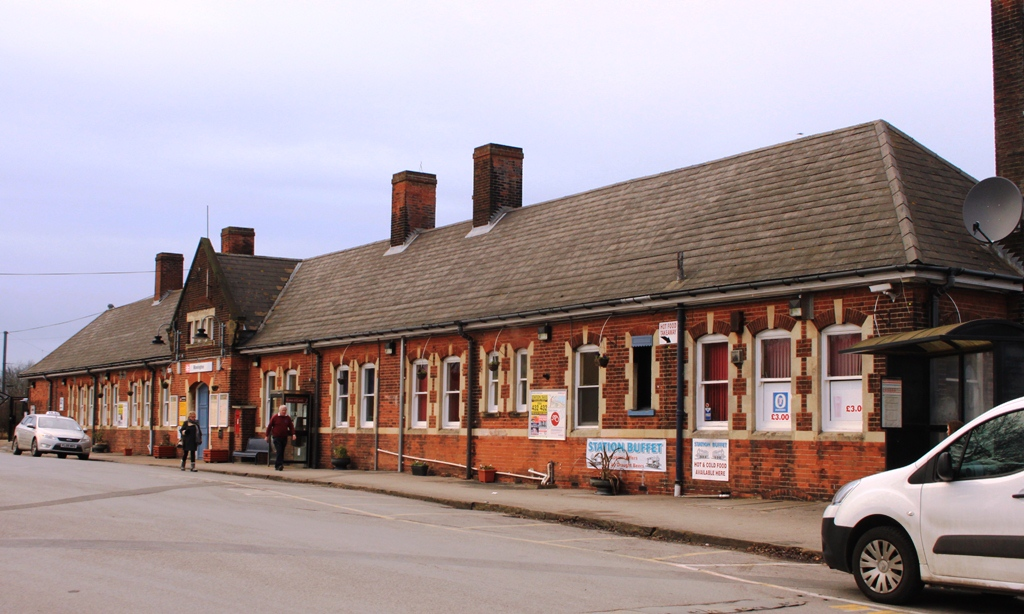

General information
- Location: Lawford, Essex; England
- Grid reference: TM093322
- Manager: Greater Anglia
- Platforms: 3

Other information
- Station code: MNG
- Classification: DfT category C2

History
- Opened: 15 June 1846

Passengers
- 2021/22: ▲0.635 million
- Interchange: ▲0.165 million
- 2022/23: ▲0.783 million
- Interchange: ▲0.261 million
- 2023/24: ▲0.907 million
- Interchange: ▼0.255 million
- 2024/25: ▲1.043 million
- Interchange: ▼0.249 million
- 2025/26: ▲1.153 million
- Interchange: ▲0.267 million
Location
Notes
- Passenger statistics from the Office of Rail and Road

Manningtree railway station is on the Great Eastern Main Line (GEML) in the East of England, serving the town of Manningtree, Essex. It is 59 miles 35 chains (95.66 km) down the line from London Liverpool Street and is situated between Colchester to the west and Ipswich to the east. The three-letter station code is MNG. It is also the western terminus of the Mayflower Line, a branch line to Harwich Town. The following station on the branch is Mistley.

The station is currently operated by Greater Anglia, who also operate all trains serving it, as part of the East Anglia franchise.

== History ==
The station was opened by the Eastern Union Railway in 1846 but rebuilt by the Great Eastern Railway in 1899–1901; this building survives. It was designed by W. N. Ashbee.

== Description ==
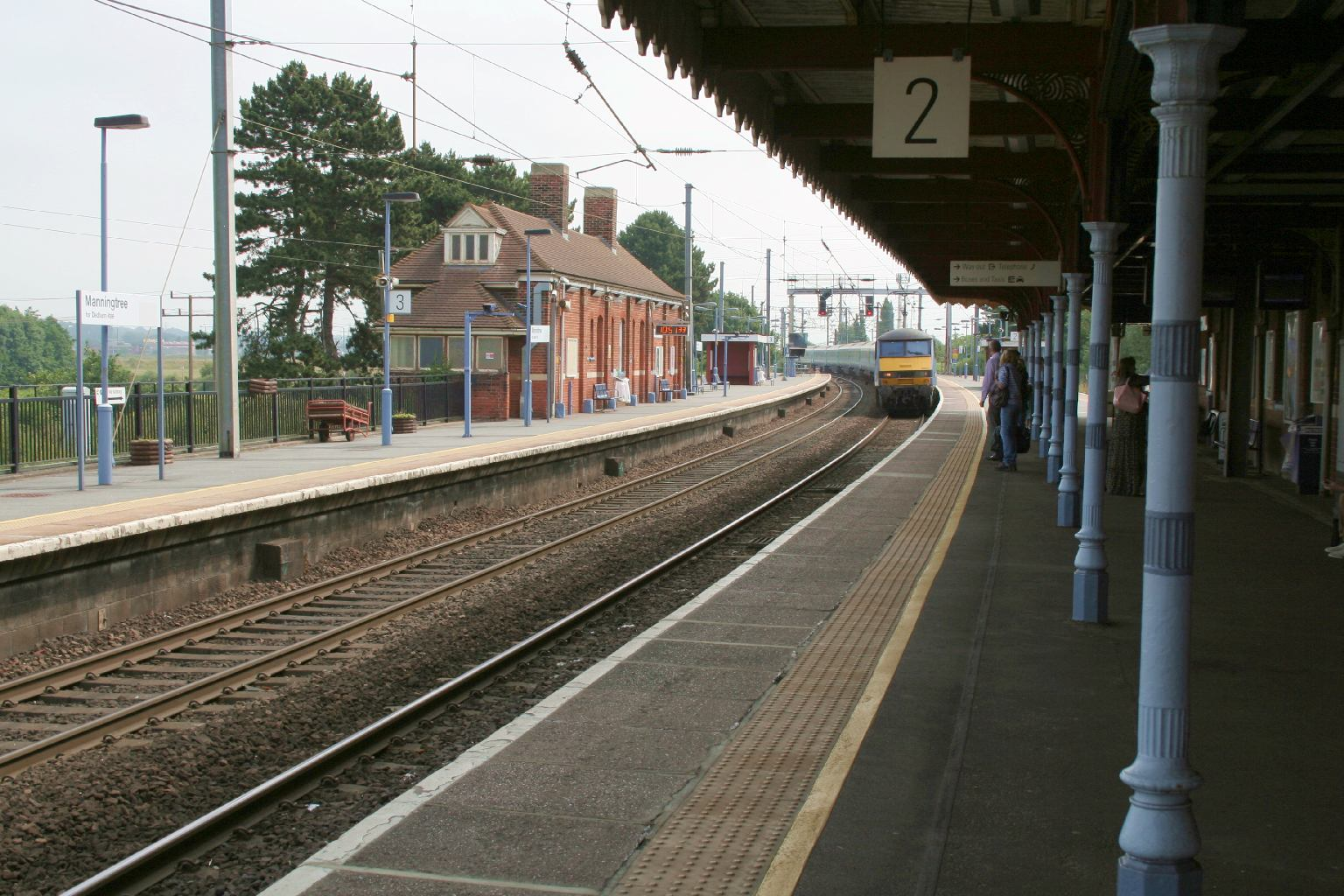
A train approaching platform 2 in 2013

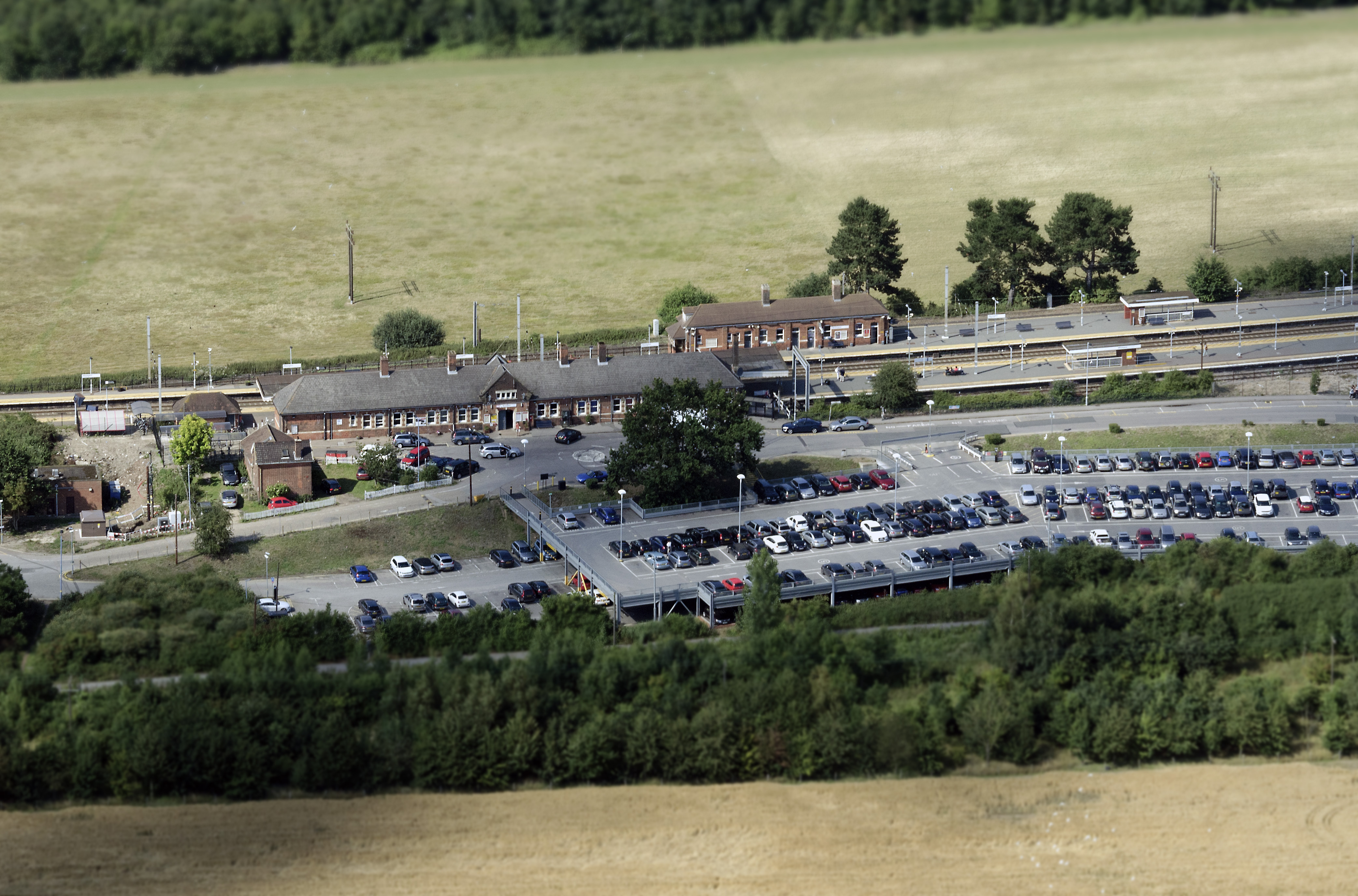
Aerial view

Immediately east of the station there is a triangle of junctions, known as the Manningtree South, North and East junctions and originally each double-track junction was controlled by an individual signal box. In 1926 the London and North Eastern Railway installed a new power box at Manningtree South which controlled all three junctions. Today, the north to east curve connecting Ipswich with Harwich Town is a single track, having been reduced from double-track. All three sides of the triangle are electrified.

A second peculiar feature just east of the station is a combination of a road underpass and a level crossing. The underpass has limited height and the parallel level crossing is needed to permit higher vehicles to cross the railway.

Platform 1 is a bay platform accessible only from the Mayflower Line. It has an operational length for five-coach trains. Platform 2 (London-bound) and platform 3 (country-bound) each have an operational length for twelve-coach trains. There is a fourth platform on the outer side of the "down" (country-bound) platform which is electrified, but its use would be confined to emergency situations. It can only be used to access the main line to or from Ipswich . The station has (on the London-bound platform) a staffed booking office and a self-service ticket machine. There is a side-gate west of the station building for use outside of office hours and a self-service ticket machine is also available here. There is a station buffet at the eastern end of the building.

The installation of lifts started in December 2015 and they are now in operation as of Autumn 2016.

== Accidents ==
- On 20 August 1898, five people were slightly injured in a collision between a train and two carriages it was moving to attach to at Manningtree. The stationary carriages contained around 50 passengers and had just been detached from a main line train; they were due to be attached to the branch line train for Harwich Town but it reversed back to them at too great a speed and shunted into them with sufficient force to propel them backward by five or six yards. A Board of Trade investigation reported the driver misjudged the position of the carriages and the speed of his train, and the shunter failed to timely signal to the driver that he was too close to the coaches and moving too fast.

== Services ==
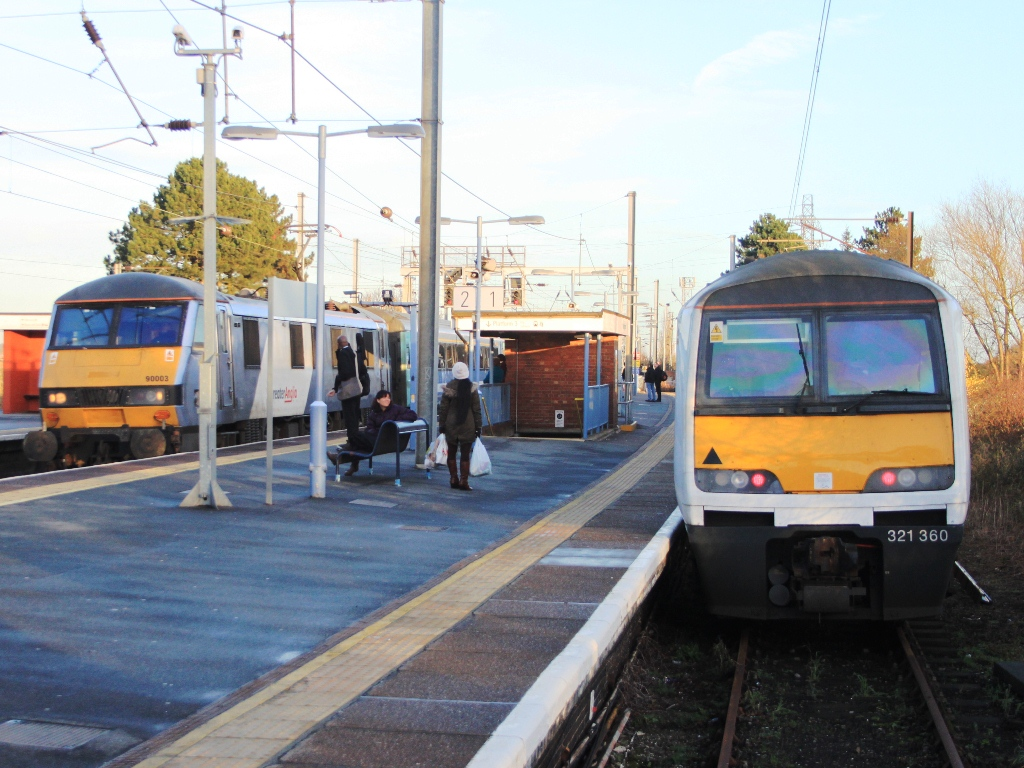
Two trains at Manningtree station

The following services typically called at Manningtree in 2024:

Operator	Route	Rolling stock	Frequency
Greater Anglia	London Liverpool Street - Chelmsford - Colchester - Manningtree - Ipswich - Diss - Norwich	Class 745	1x per hour
Greater Anglia	London Liverpool Street - Stratford - Colchester - Manningtree - Ipswich - Stowmarket - Diss - Norwich	Class 745	1x per hour
Greater Anglia	London Liverpool Street - Stratford - Shenfield - Chelmsford - Beaulieu Park - Hatfield Peverel - Witham - Kelvedon - Marks Tey - Colchester - Manningtree - Ipswich	Class 720	1x per hour
Greater Anglia	Manningtree - Mistley - Wrabness - Harwich International - Dovercourt - Harwich Town	Class 720	1x per hour

Preceding station	National Rail	Following station
Colchester	Greater Anglia Great Eastern Main Line	Ipswich
Colchester	Greater Anglia Dutchflyer; Limited Service	Harwich International
Terminus	Greater Anglia Mayflower Line	Mistley
Historical railways
Ardleigh	Great Eastern Railway Eastern Union Railway	Bentley
