= Crockleford Heath =

Village in Essex, United Kingdom

Coordinates: 51.897°N 0.965°E

Crockleford Heath is hamlet in the civil parish of Ardleigh in Essex. It is located 2 1/2 miles south-west of the village centre.

Crockleford Heath once had its own school, built in about 1832 for the children of agricultural labourers; it later became a Church of England mission chapel.

A Primitive Methodist chapel was opened in Crockleford Heath in 1859.
