= Ipswich railway station =

Railway station in Suffolk, England

Ipswich
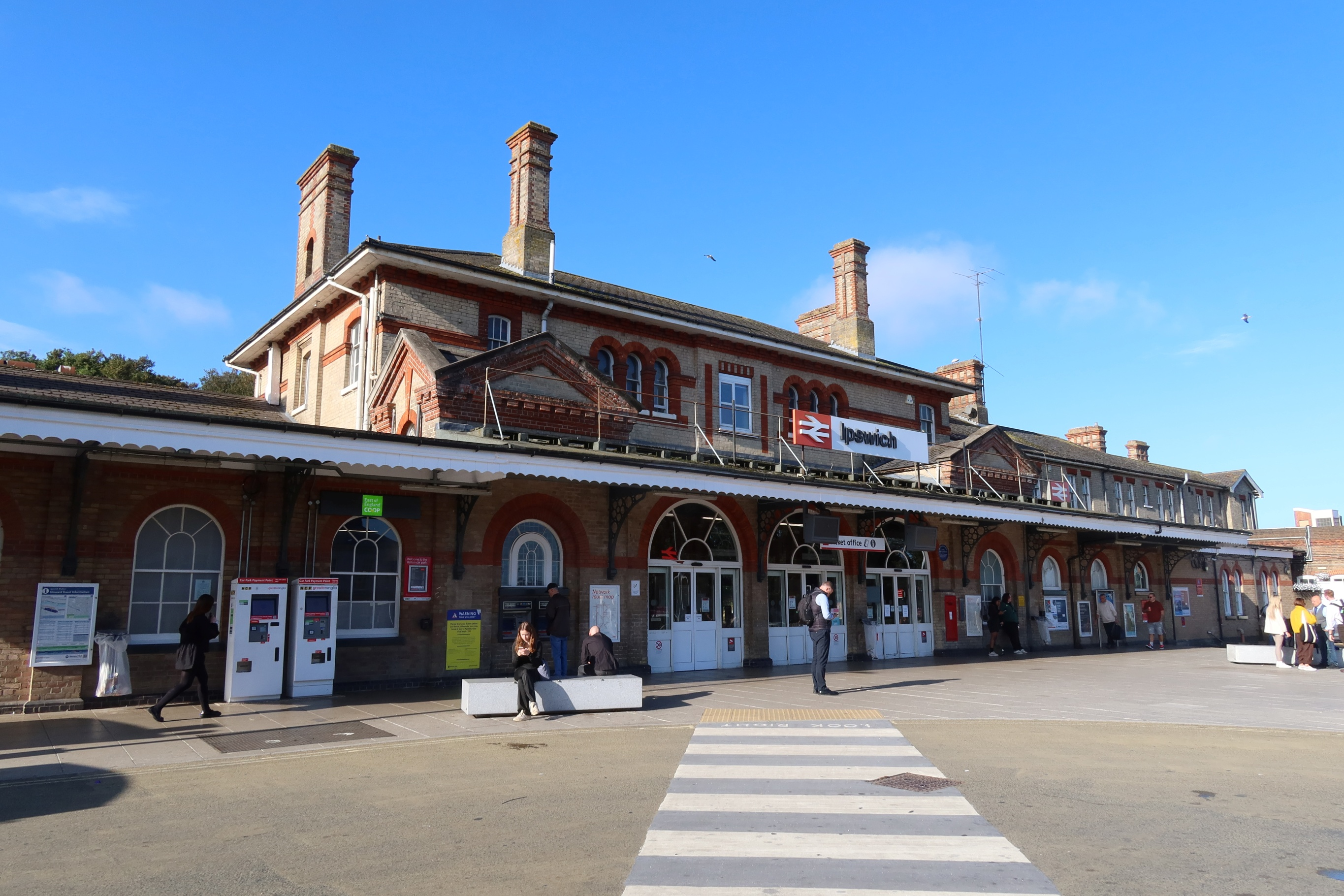

General information
- Location: Ipswich, Borough of Ipswich, England
- Coordinates: 52.051°N 1.144°E
- Grid reference: TM156437
- Manager: Greater Anglia
- Platforms: 4

Other information
- Station code: IPS
- Classification: DfT category B

History
- Opened: 1860

Passengers
- 2020/21: ▼0.727 million
- Interchange: ▼0.108 million
- 2021/22: ▲2.126 million
- Interchange: ▲0.428 million
- 2022/23: ▲2.683 million
- Interchange: ▲0.588 million
- 2023/24: ▲3.028 million
- Interchange: ▲0.666 million
- 2024/25: ▲3.371 million
- Interchange: ▲0.761 million
Location
Notes
- Passenger statistics from the Office of Rail and Road

Ipswich railway station serves the town of Ipswich, in Suffolk, England. It lies on the Great Eastern Main Line, 68 miles 59 chains (68.7 mi; 110.6 km) down the main line from London Liverpool Street; it is situated between Manningtree to the south and Needham Market to the north. Ipswich is also the terminus of the East Suffolk Line to Lowestoft, a branch line to Felixstowe, and a regional cross-country route to Ely and Cambridge. The station is managed by Greater Anglia, which also operates all trains serving it, as part of the East Anglia franchise.

== History ==
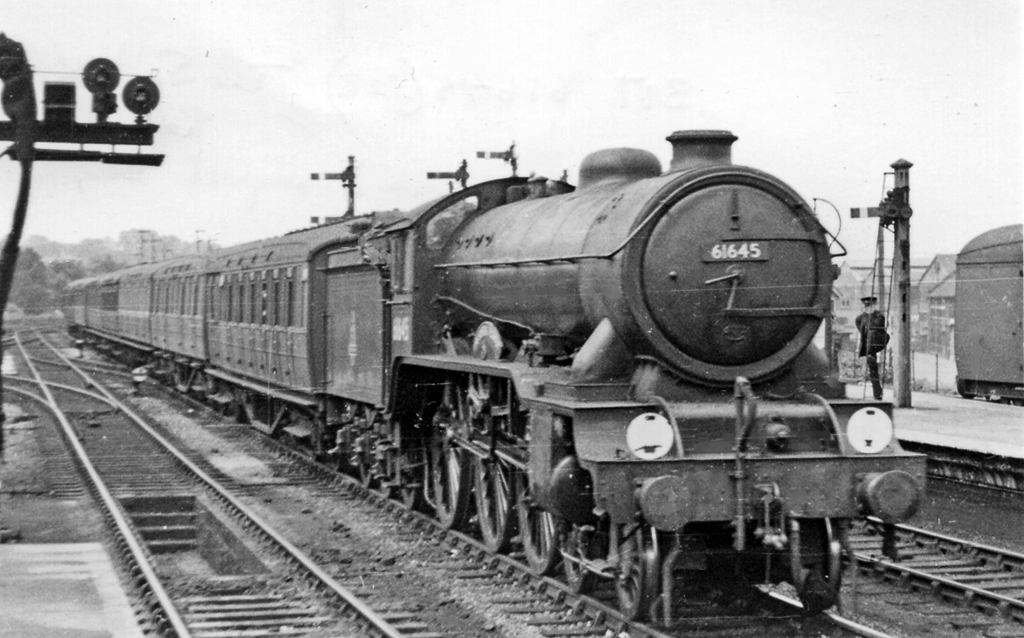
A Liverpool Street express arriving behind a B17 class locomotive, 1951

The Eastern Union Railway (EUR) opened its first terminus in the town at Ipswich Stoke Hill in 1846 on Station Road; it was sited at the other end of the current tunnel, close to the old quay for the steamboats and the aptly named Steamboat Tavern. The Ipswich Steam Navigation Company had been formed in 1824/25, during a period of "steamship mania" and briefly offered services from the quay between Ipswich and London, calling at Walton-on-the-Naze.

The current station is just to the north of Stoke tunnel, which was constructed by the Ipswich & Bury Railway as part of the Ipswich to Ely Line opening as far as Bury St. Edmunds in late 1846.

The station was resited to its present location in 1860. Some sources suggest that the main building was thought to be principally the work of Peter Bruff, who had certainly started the structure.

Architect Sancton Wood (1816–1886) won a competition to design the new station and it may have been his design. However, the architectural series started by Nikolaus Pevsner states:

The present station opened in 1860. By Robert Sinclair, the Eastern Counties Railway's engineer, although Gordon Biddle suggests the design may have been Peter Bruff's. Called "graceful and pretty" in the Handbook of 1864. Perhaps it struck people as that when it was new. White and red brick, with round-arched windows, low and spreading. The buildings on the island platform, added in 1883, are much more ornate, with carved keystones, terracotta roundels and ironwork by Matthew T. Shaw & Co, Millwall.

As built in 1860, the station had a single main through platform, with some shorter bay platforms at the north end. When the new station was completed, a new road (Princes Street) linking the station to the town was also opened.

By the 1860s, the railways in East Anglia were in financial trouble and most were leased to the Eastern Counties Railway (ECR). Although they wished to amalgamate formally, they could not obtain government agreement for this until 1862, when the Great Eastern Railway (GER) was formed by the amalgamation. The island platform at Ipswich was added by the GER in 1883.

In 1883, an island platform was opened (Note: This is today's platforms 3 and 4.) to improve operations at the station. Many of the original platform buildings are still extant today and close inspection reveals the heads of what are believed to be Greek Gods incorporated into the design.

Ipswich engine shed (Note: It later had the shed code 32B.) opened in 1846 and was at the south end of Stoke tunnel. It was the third-largest shed in the Great Eastern area during the steam era, after those at Stratford and Cambridge.

At the beginning of World War I, soldiers of the Norfolk Yeomanry regiment were deployed to Ipswich to guard key railway bridges in the area. They were relieved by the ninth field company Royal Engineers.

In 1923, the GER amalgamated with other railways to form the London and North Eastern Railway (LNER). On 30 April 1932, the LNER arranged an exhibition of railway stock at Ipswich. The show was opened by Sir Arthur Churchman, of tobacco family fame, and over 16,000 visited the show. The proceeds were divided between the Ipswich and East Suffolk Hospital and railway charities. The exhibits were: (Note: Arranged by class / wheel arrangement / number / name.)

- 'Hush Hush' W1 class 4-6-4 No. 10000;
- A1 Class 4-6-2 no. 4476 Royal Lancer with corridor tender and Flying Scotsman headboard;
- Class D49 4-4-0 no. 201 "The Braham Moor". This last locomotive was brand new and had not been in service.

The show also included a sleeping car and a new composite corridor coach.

In 1948, following nationalisation of the railways, Ipswich became part of British Railways' Eastern Region.

By the late 1970s, the costs of running the dated mechanical signalling systems north of Colchester was recognised and, in 1978, a scheme for track rationalisation and resignalling was duly submitted to the Department for Transport. This was followed by a proposal to electrify the remainder of the Great Eastern Main Line (GEML) to Ipswich and Norwich in 1980.

The early 1980s saw track rationalisation signalling work and route electrification carried out in the Ipswich area; on 9 April 1985, the first electric train consisting of two Class 305 electric multiple units (EMUs) pulled into Ipswich station. The previous year, another member of the class had been dragged to Ipswich by a diesel locomotive and was used for crew training. The first passenger carrying train was formed of Class 309 EMUs, which ran on 17 April 1985. From 13 May 1985, InterCity trains from Liverpool Street were hauled by Class 86 electric locomotives which, until the line to Norwich was electrified, would be replaced by Class 47s at Ipswich to continue the journey. During 1985–87, the line to Norwich was electrified and through electric working commenced in May 1987.

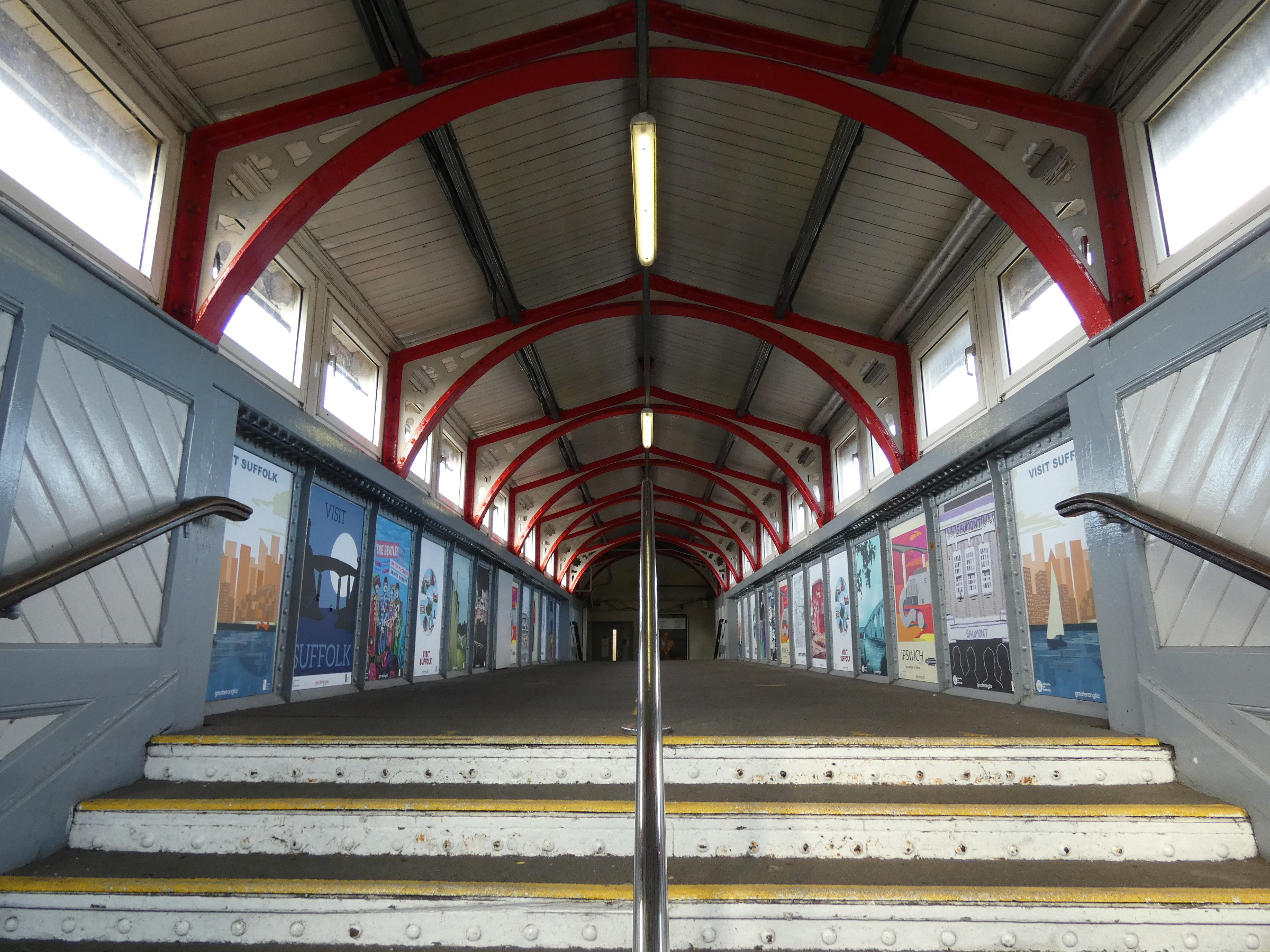
The original footbridge

The station's original lifts were removed in 1983, when the line was electrified.

Following the privatisation of British Rail, services from Ipswich were operated by Anglia Railways from 1997 until 2004, after which the franchise was won by National Express East Anglia, operating under the One brand (Note: This new franchise merged the previous Great Eastern and Anglia operations together.) until February 2008.

In the five years between 2004–05 and 2008–09, patronage rose by 50% from two to three million per year. Ticket barriers were installed in the station building in 2009 and the exit gate on platform 2 was closed permanently.

New lifts, which had been promised for many years since they were removed in 1983, were opened in June 2011.

In October 2011, the Department for Transport awarded the new franchise to Abellio; the services formerly operated by National Express transferring to Greater Anglia in February 2012. Abellio then became responsible for the operation of Ipswich station.

The station won the Large Station of the Year award at the National Rail Awards in 2018.

=== Historic services ===
Passenger train services to and from Ipswich have always been dominated by the main line to London Liverpool Street, but traffic to the north also served lines to Bury St Edmunds, Norwich, (Note: Stopping trains, using the main line.) and the East Suffolk Line to Yarmouth South Town and later to Lowestoft. Through-trains to Lowestoft operated until the 1980s and were briefly revived in the early part of the 21st century, although the need for more commuter seats south of Colchester saw these terminating at Ipswich, with two daily services extended to Harwich International as of December 2019).

Many minor local stations closed during the 1960s, as did branch lines to Framlingham and Aldeburgh. Services on the Felixstowe branch have, with the exception of the first few years of that line's existence, started from Ipswich as have local stopping services on the East Suffolk, Norwich and Cambridge lines. One interesting working in the 1920s and 1930s was a service that operated from Sheffield Victoria, via Worksop, Spalding, March and Ely to Felixstowe during the summer months.

By far the most interesting working was the boat train, which operated between Harwich Parkeston Quay and various destinations until the 1990s. The privatisation of British Rail in the 1990s saw this service terminated at Peterborough. Another long-distance working was from Colchester to York, via Lincoln Central, which ran for several years.

Throughout the steam era, trains were predominantly hauled by Great Eastern Railway locomotives and, indeed, when steam ended in Suffolk in 1960, some of these locomotives were still operated. After the grouping of 1923, LNER-designed locomotives were also employed in the area, with the B17 4-6-0 class working many main line services. After nationalisation in 1948, British Railways introduced the Britannia class 4-6-2 class, which worked main line services until they were succeeded by diesel locomotives in the late 1950s.

East Anglia was the first region to be worked completely by diesel trains with Class 40s taking over main line express workings. The first one of these ran in June 1958, complete with a headboard with the wording "First diesel-hauled train on the GE in public service." These were succeeded by Class 37s and Class 40s up until electrification in the mid-1980s; from 1985, Class 86s electric locomotives took over, with Class 90s from 2003.

Local services in this era were worked by diesel multiple units (DMUs), although smaller locomotives such as Class 31s, hauled trains to Birmingham New Street and Cambridge during the 1980s.

Former train operating company Anglia Railways ran services, known as London Crosslink, from Norwich to Basingstoke, via Stratford and the North London Line. This service started in 2000, using Class 170 DMUs, and ended in 2002.

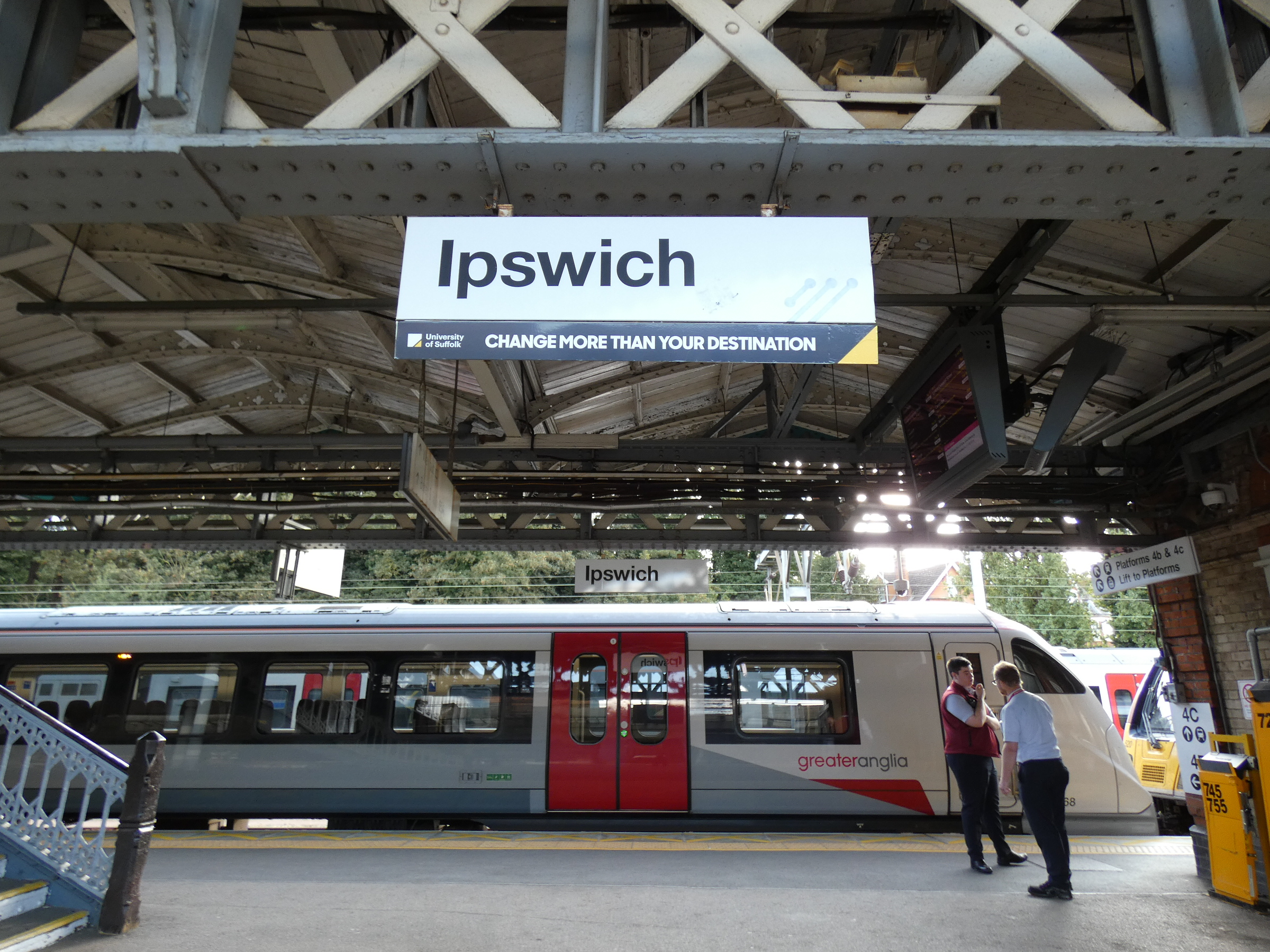
A Greater Anglia train on platform 4, October 2023

In January 2020, the Class 745 FLIRT multiple units began entering service to replace the Class 90 hauled sets. Following the introduction of these units, the locomotive-hauled sets were withdrawn from service, with the last Class 90 running passenger services on 24 March 2020. The Class 90s operate Freightliner services along with Class 66 and Class 70s diesels, and formerly Class 86s, which were withdrawn in March 2021.

== Layout and facilities ==
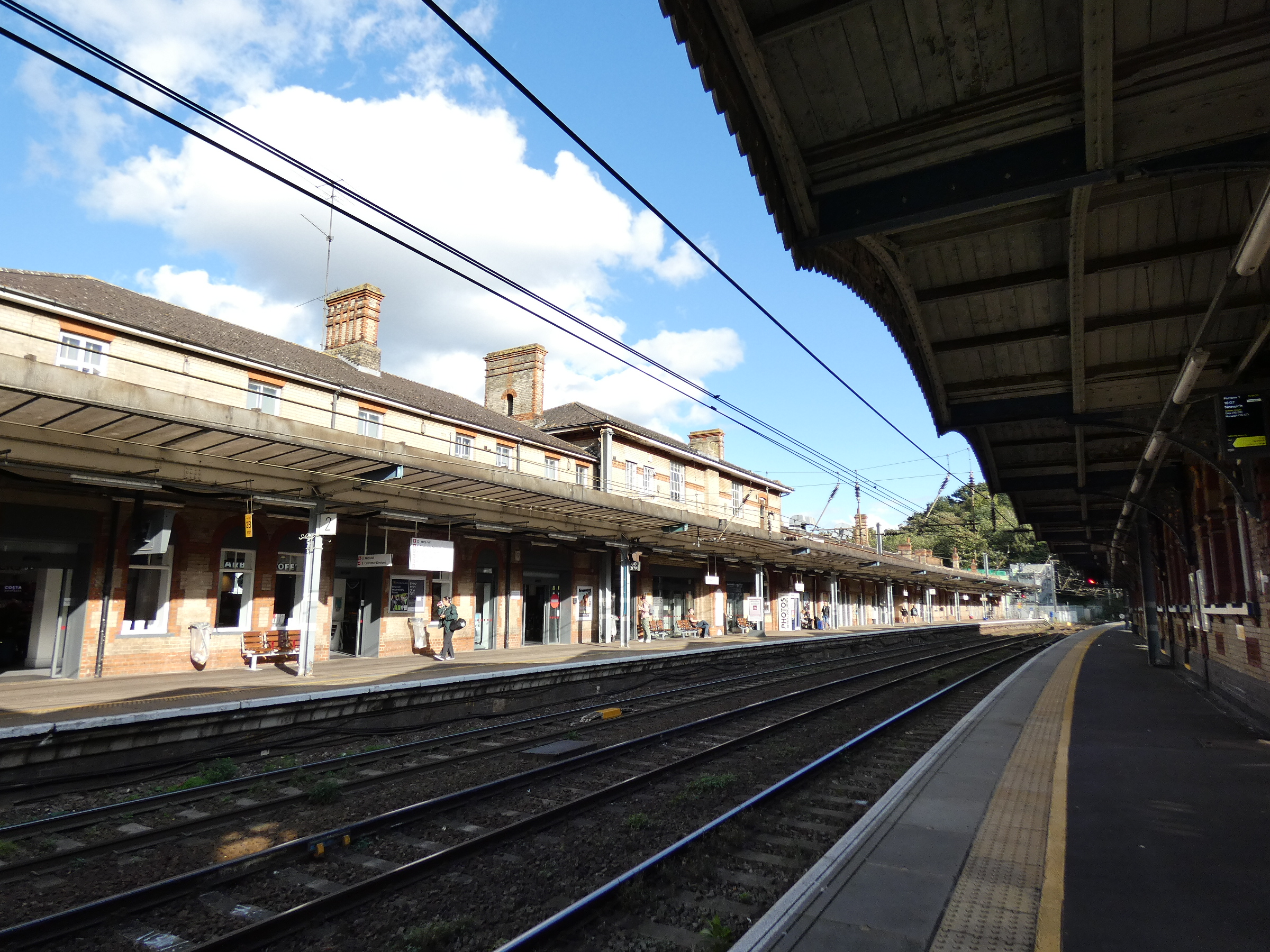
Platforms 2 and 3

The platforms are currently utilised as follows:

1. is a bay platform for trains to/from Lowestoft and Felixstowe, as well as some Cambridge and Peterborough services
2. is used for inter-city to London from Norwich, as well as most Felixstowe services
3. is used for inter-city to Norwich from London, as well as some Cambridge services
4. (4A, 4B and 4C) is used for services to Cambridge, Lowestoft and Peterborough, along with stopping services to London.

There is an avoiding line between the lines that serves the main through platforms 2 and 3.

Prior to electrification, there were two short sidings at the London end of the up platform, which were used for locomotive changes on up trains when required.

Platforms 3 and 4 can be accessed via the footbridge or lift.

Opposite platform 4 is a stabling point used by Freightliner diesel and electric locomotives. Classes 66, 70 and 90 are the most common, although locomotives of other companies have been known to use the point. In July 2019, Freightliner was granted planning permission to build a maintenance depot within the yard.

The station has extensive facilities, including self-service ticket machines, ticket counters, a convenience store, two cafés, a multi-storey car park, taxi rank, bus station and ATMs. The whole stations is now fully accessible, with lifts having been installed in 2011.

The entrance to the station was remodelled during 2015 in a £1 million scheme.

== Services ==
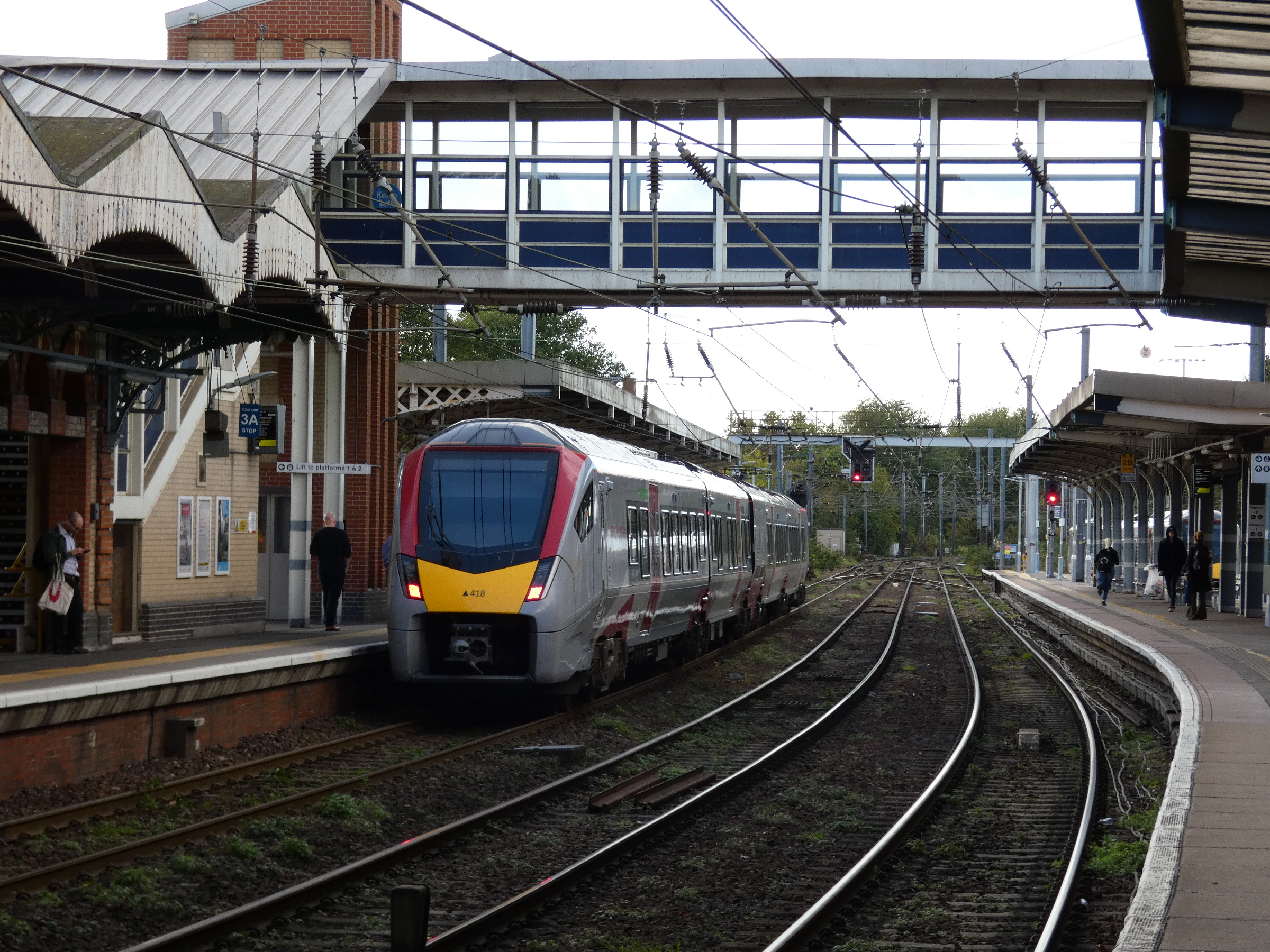
A Greater Anglia train underneath the accessible footbridge

The following off-peak services typically call at Ipswich on weekdays:

Operator	Route	Rolling stock	Frequency
Greater Anglia	London Liverpool Street - Colchester - Manningtree - Ipswich - Diss - Norwich	Class 745	1x per hour
Greater Anglia	London Liverpool Street - Stratford - Chelmsford - Colchester - Manningtree - Ipswich - Stowmarket - Diss - Norwich	Class 745	1x per hour
Greater Anglia	London Liverpool Street - Stratford - Shenfield - Chelmsford - Beaulieu Park - Hatfield Peverel - Witham - Kelvedon - Marks Tey - Colchester - Manningtree - Ipswich	Class 720	1x per hour
Greater Anglia	Ipswich - Stowmarket - Bury St. Edmunds - Soham - Ely - March - Manea - Whittlesea - Peterborough	Class 755	Every 2 hours
Greater Anglia	(Harwich International -) Ipswich - Needham Market - Stowmarket - Elmswell - Thurston - Bury St. Edmunds - Kennett - Newmarket - Dullingham - Cambridge	Class 755	1x per hour
Greater Anglia	(Harwich International -) Ipswich - Woodbridge - Melton - Wickham Market - Saxmundham - Darsham - Halesworth - Brampton - Beccles - Oulton Broad South - Lowestoft	Class 755	1x per hour
Greater Anglia	Ipswich - Westerfield - Derby Road - Trimley - Felixstowe	Class 755	1x per hour

Preceding station	National Rail	Following station
Manningtree	Greater Anglia Great Eastern Main Line	Stowmarket
Terminus	Greater Anglia Ipswich–Ely line	Needham Market
Terminus	Greater Anglia Felixstowe branch line	Westerfield
Terminus	Greater Anglia East Suffolk line	Westerfield
Needham Market	Greater Anglia Dutchflyer Limited service	Harwich International
	Future services	
Bury St Edmunds	East West Rail; Oxford–Ipswich	Terminus
	Historical railways	
Bentley Line open, station closed	Great Eastern Railway Eastern Union Railway	Bramford Line open, station closed
Colchester	Anglia Railways London Crosslink	Stowmarket

== Goods facilities ==
Ipswich had a number of goods facilities and a myriad of private sidings, as well as extensive railways in the docks. In 2021, only the Upper Yard is open.

=== Upper Yard ===
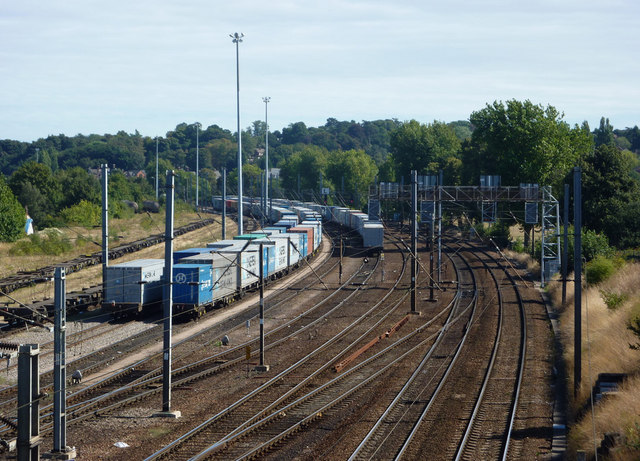
Ipswich Upper Yard in 2009, with several container trains present

This is located between Ipswich and East Suffolk Junction on the east side of the line. The yard ws still active in 2018, with Freightliner container trains recessing or running round before running to/from the docks at Felixstowe.

In the past, a branch from this yard ran down and across Ranelagh Road, crossed the river Gipping to Ipswich Lower Yard and the eastern part of Ipswich docks, but traffic ceased in c.1990. The remains of the branch line were still visible in 2018.

In the main yard, a transhipment shed existed for many years where small consignments were transferred between wagons; there was no public or road access to this facility, which was closed in 1951.

Local and regional freight trains serving local stations as well as the other goods facilities in the Ipswich area were remarshalled in this yard. Regional destinations included Goodmayes and Temple Mills in London, and Whitemoor (March) in Cambridgeshire.

The yard was developed for longer trains during 2014 with improved access to and from the East Suffolk Line and longer sidings. The majority of trains are traffic to or from Felixstowe Docks.

Further changes were made during 2021, with the construction of a new vehicle maintenance facility (VMF), which opened in August 2022 with freight locomotives now stabling in the Upper Yard/East Suffolk Junction area.

=== Ranelagh Road sidings ===
Another branch further to the north crossed over Ranelagh Road to a headshunt and then served a warehouse. This was built c.1920 and was going to be a new route into Ipswich docks avoiding the level crossing on the other branch. The warehouse served a number of companies including Boots, J. Lyons & Co, McFarlane's Biscuits, and Swift and Co. The site was also used to dump redundant permanent way materials; in the 1970s, travelling circuses used the site.

The bridge was demolished in 1967 and an abutment remains (in 2013). The rest of this site has been redeveloped with retail facilities.

=== Lower Yard ===
This yard contained a wooden goods shed, where goods for the town were loaded or unloaded. Cattle pens were also located close to this yard, though traffic ceased in the 1960s; there was a siding to Constantine Road power station. A small engine shed was located in this area for locomotives that worked in the docks, although they were officially allocated to Ipswich engine shed.

At the east end of the yard, the railway lines crossed over Bridge Street which, until the 1980s, was the first road; crossing over the river Orwell from 1903, there was a tram line necessitating special signalling arrangements between the two systems.

In the latter part of the 20th century, a construction terminal and a British Oxygen Company terminal were also located in this area. Most of the site has now been redeveloped into retail premises.

=== Ipswich docks ===
The docks were served by a myriad of dockside lines, which fell out of use during the 1990s; few remnants of the dockside lines are evident today.

This was built as a branch off the Bury line in 1848, crossing the river Gipping adjacent to the station and served the northern side of the docks area. The town corporation would not allow steam engines to pass over Stoke Bridge, so the dockside tramway was worked by horses until the corporation relented in 1880. However, even then, the locomotives had to be fitted with animal guards and side valances, an arrangement that continued until 9 May 1969.

An early customer of this line was Catt and Quadling, a carriage building company; it built a number of carriages for the Eastern Union Railway at a works in Handford Road. The premises, which had no railway access, was blown down in a gale in February 1847, damaging several carriages under construction; after that, Catt withdrew from the railway part of the business, but continued making road carts. Quadling relocated to new premises, located in the modern day Quadling Street, and had a siding off the branch. The company built further carriages for the EUR and Great Western Railway, as well as some coal wagons. However, these premises also suffered significant gale damage in February 1863, leading to Quadling going bankrupt.

Ipswich Lower Goods Yard was constructed by the ECR on this line in 1860. After 1880, the lines were worked by small locomotives with enclosed wheels, such as J70 tram engines. The dockside tramways covered both sides of the dock and crossed the 1881 lock gates at the south end of the dock. Freight was switched between trains and ships on the dockside.

Sidings were provided for the following businesses: (Note: This list is not complete or date specific.)

- Fisons (fertiliser)
- Packards (fertiliser)
- BP, Esso, National Benzole and Shell (oil)
- Tolly Cobbold (a brewery)
- Cliff Quay Power station (which closed in 1983)
- Ipswich gasworks
- Cranfields (mill)
- William Brown (timber).

Freight traffic to the docks ceased when container and grain traffic to Cliff Quay ended in 1992.

=== East Suffolk Junction ===
This is where the main line for Norwich and the East Suffolk Line split. There were industrial sidings serving Eastern Counties Farmers, Petters (Ipswich) Limited, and Manganese Bronze and Brass. These companies had their own locomotives which worked to and from the upper yard.

An extensive site with loading and unloading platforms was developed in 1934 to serve the needs of the 1934 Royal Agricultural Show, which was held on 3–7 July at Chantry Park. A civil engineers' depot was developed here afterwards.

In 2013, it was suggested that this area would be the site of the locomotive fuelling point, which would be relocated from the station. However, no such move had materialised by the September 2018.

=== Sproughton Sugar Beet Factory ===
A British Sugar Corporation-owned facility, which traded as Ipswich Beet Sugar Factory until 1936, had its own fleet of industrial locomotives; on occasions, shunting locomotives from Ipswich engine shed were also hired out to the factory. The sidings were established in 1925 and, at times, were used as an overflow when the upper yard at Ipswich was congested. Railway traffic ceased in 1982.

=== West Bank ===
This branch still exists (as of 2018), but traffic has been sporadic over the last few years, In 2013, it was not until 20 August that traffic in the form of sea dredged aggregate was operated on the branch. It was hoped this would be a weekly trip and sand traffic to Watford was also expected.

Originally known as the Griffin Wharf Branch, it had sidings that served several businesses on the dockside including:

- Ransomes & Rapier (engineering works)
- Cooksedge & Co Ltd
- Christopherson
- Watkins
- Coal depot (GER/LNER).

A couple of shunting horses were based at this location during Great Eastern days (pre-1923). The West Bank Ferry terminal was redeveloped in 1973.

Derby Road and Westerfield stations both had goods yards; a number of industrial facilities were located on the Felixstowe Branch Line.

=== Horse box and carriage truck traffic ===
A small set of sidings existed at the south end of Ipswich station, on the up side of the tracks adjacent to the tunnel. Only one track was accessible from the main line; the other sidings being accessed from a wagon turntable. Shunting horses were used in this location to position the vehicles; Ipswich had an allocation of around 30 horses in the 1890s. One track off the wagon turntable led to a small shed, which housed a steam fire engine mounted on a flat truck.

By the 1970s, only a single siding remained which was used to stable locomotives occasionally; it was lifted in c.1980.

== Signalling ==
The last of the local signal boxes closed in 1985, when the area was resignalled and electrified. Currently all signals are controlled from Colchester Power Signal Box. The following is a list of signal boxes found during the period when Ipswich was controlled by mechanical signalling:

- Halifax Junction (access from main line to West Bank/Griffin Wharf Branch and the engine shed)
- Ipswich station (the south end, on platform 3/4)
- Ipswich Goods Junction (120 levers for signals and points, manned by three shifts of signalmen supported by two box lads)
- Upper Yard (known locally as No.2 Box)
- East Suffolk Junction
- Sproughton (opened 1925, replacing the signal box at Bramford).
- Westerfield Bank (1898-1926)
- Westerfield Junction
- Derby Road
- Ranelagh Road Crossing Box
- Lower Yard.

== Water troughs ==
Water troughs were installed at Halifax Junction in 1897, just south of Ipswich tunnel. These were used by trains to pick up water, using a scoop operated by the engine crew, although water cranes were also located on the platforms at the station. Using the troughs was a quicker method of filling the tenders of steam locomotives and they were located between the rails in the centre of the tracks; these were heated in winter to prevent freezing. The Ipswich troughs fell out of use in the 1960s, when steam locomotives were withdrawn from East Anglia.

== Ipswich tunnel ==
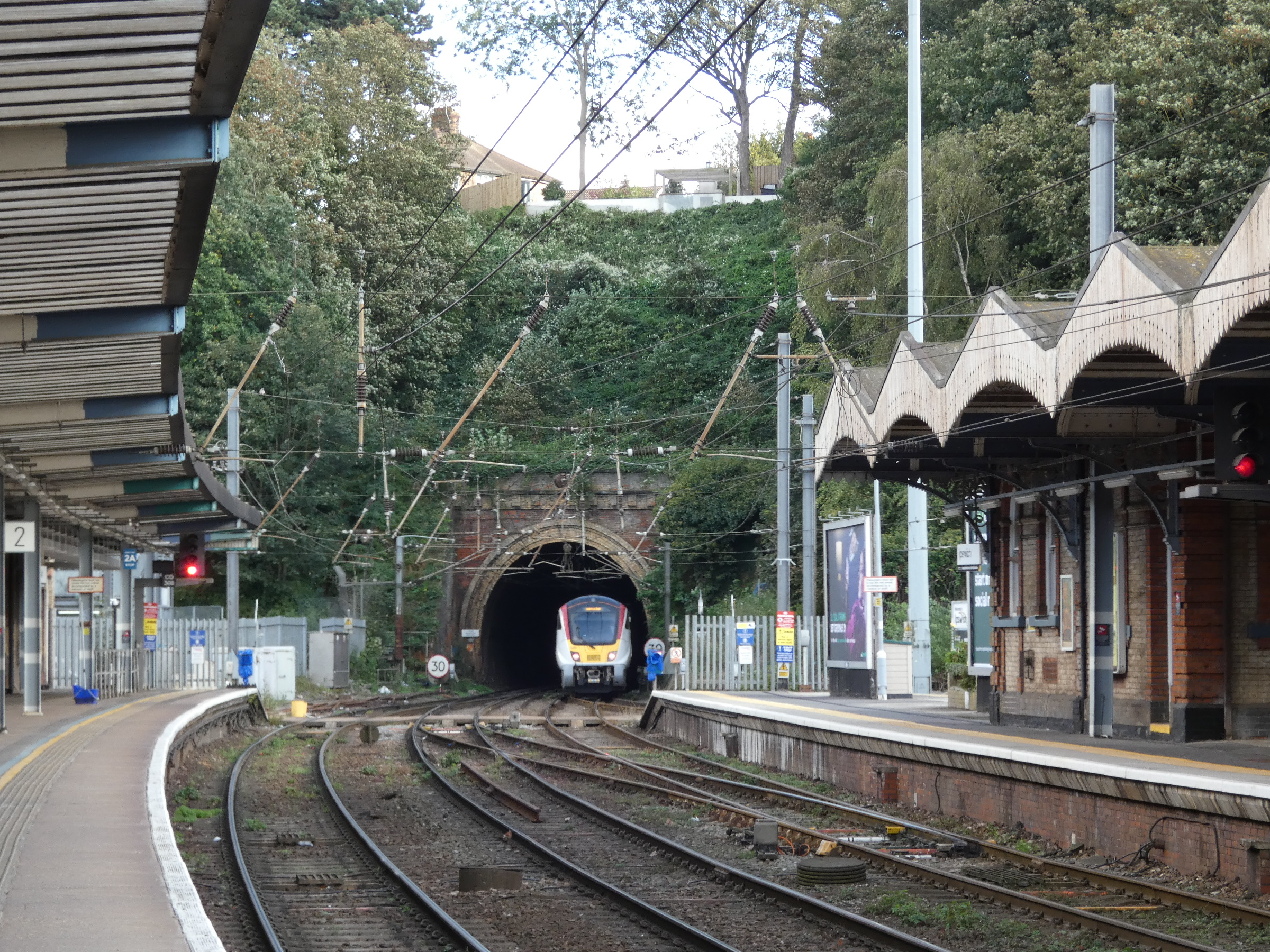
View of the tunnel from platform 2

The tunnel was built by the Eastern Union Railway's engineer Peter Bruff and was opened in November 1846. Trains from Bury St. Edmunds passed the existing station site, at that point undeveloped; they continued to Halifax Junction south of the tunnel, where they then reversed into the original Croft street terminus. It was built as there was no room between the river Orwell and Stoke Hill for a railway and is thought to be the first tunnel in the world to be built on a continuous curve. During its construction, many fossils were found including those of a woolly mammoth. Further excavations in 1908 and 1919, led by Nina Frances Layard, revealed remains of mammoths, a turtle and lions. The latter excavation was as a result of the GER widening the cutting east of the tunnel, to accommodate some additional sidings. Further bones were found in 1975 by archeologist John Wymer.

There have been two accidents in the tunnel:

- On 5 May 1910, a wagon examiner was taking a short cut through the tunnel, which was forbidden; it is believed that he tripped whilst trying to get out of the way of an engine.
- On 21 August 1912, a platelayer (track worker) was hit by the engine of a troop train, having failed to get out of the way.

For many years, the tunnel was regarded as an obstacle to electrification with insufficient clearance for the overhead wires. In 1985, however, the tunnel was temporarily closed and the track bed lowered to accommodate the overhead electric lines. The tunnel was closed again in 2004 to allow for work to lower the track, in order to enable larger containers to pass through on goods trains to and from the Port of Felixstowe.

== Ipswich Railway Chord ==
Known officially the Bacon Factory Curve, this is a short 1,415-metre (4,642 ft) section of track constructed to link the East Suffolk Line and the Great Eastern Main Line, just north of Ipswich Goods Yard. This chord, which was opened to traffic in March 2014, allows freight trains from the Port of Felixstowe to access the West Coast Main Line, using the Ipswich to Ely Line and a cross-country route via Nuneaton, rather than via the GEML and the North London Line.

The chord was built on the site of a bacon factory, hence its original name. Preliminary work for the chord started in August 2012 and the Secretary of State for Transport granted full development consent on 5 September 2012, which came into effect on 26 September 2012. Two new junctions were created by the scheme: Boss Hall Junction, at the eastern end of the chord with the East Suffolk Line, and Europa Junction with the GEML, located close to the site of the Sproughton sugar beet sidings. The chord opened to regular traffic on 31 March 2014, although the first revenue-earning train, headed by Class 66 locomotive on a Felixstowe–Doncaster container train, ran on 24 March. The first passenger train to use the chord was on 11 November 2017, when the Flying Scotsman turned around its Norwich to Ipswich Cathedrals Express railtour.
