= Ardleigh railway station =

Disused railway station in Ardleigh, Tendring

Coordinates: 51.92136°N 0.98440°E

Ardleigh
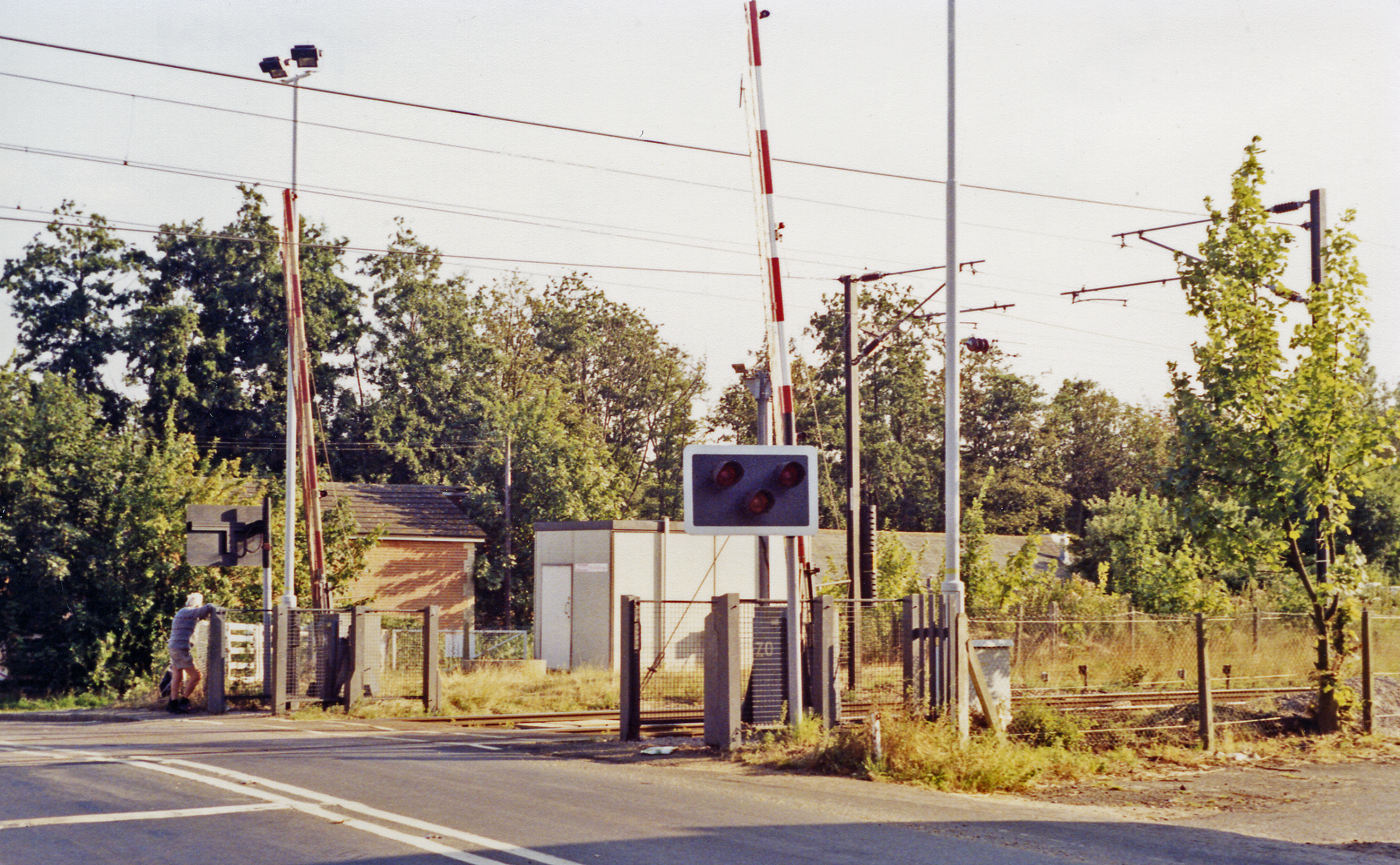
- Location of the station (1991)

General information
- Location: Ardleigh, Tendring; England
- Platforms: 2

Other information
- Status: Disused

History
- Original company: Eastern Union Railway
- Pre-grouping: Great Eastern Railway
- Post-grouping: London and North Eastern Railway; Eastern Region of British Railways

Key dates
- 15 June 1846: Station opened
- 6 November 1967: Station closed
Location

Ardleigh railway station served the village of Ardleigh in Essex, England. The station was situated on the Great Eastern Main Line.

== History ==
Opened by the Eastern Union Railway, then absorbed by the Great Eastern Railway, it joined the London and North Eastern Railway during the Grouping of 1923. The line then passed on to the Eastern Region of British Railways on nationalisation in 1948.

There were sidings on both the down and up side at the London end of the station. Those on the up side included goods sheds and handled both horticultural and seed traffics until the goods service was closed on 7 December 1964.

The station was then closed for passenger traffic by the British Railways Board on 6 November 1967.

== The site today ==
Trains pass the site on the electrified Great Eastern Main Line.

Preceding station	Historical railways	Following station
Manningtree; Line and station open	Eastern Region of British Railways; Great Eastern Main Line	Colchester; Line and station open
