= Thurston railway station =

Railway station in Suffolk, England

Thurston
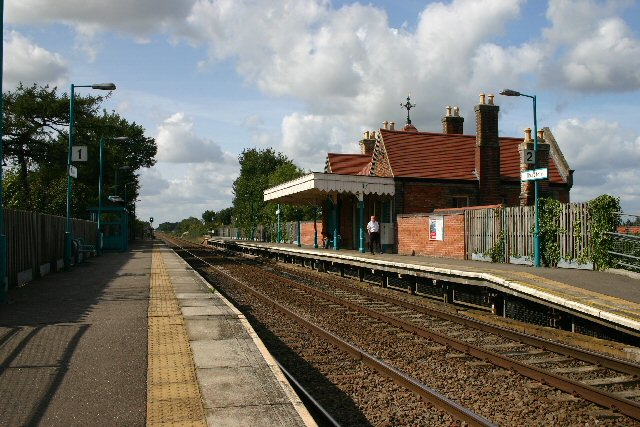

General information
- Location: Thurston, Mid Suffolk; England
- Coordinates: 52.25°N 0.8086°E
- Grid reference: TL918650
- Managed by: Greater Anglia
- Platforms: 2

Other information
- Station code: TRS
- Classification: DfT category F2

History
- Opened: 1846

Passengers
- 2020/21: ▼15,688
- 2021/22: ▲76,036
- 2022/23: ▲95,720
- 2023/24: ▲114,330
- 2024/25: ▲123,640
Location
Notes
- Passenger statistics from the Office of Rail and Road

Thurston railway station serves the village of Thurston in Suffolk, England. The station, and all trains serving it, are operated by Greater Anglia.

It is served primarily by local services between Ipswich and Cambridge.

== History ==
Thurston station was opened by the Ipswich and Bury Railway in 1846. The main building was designed by Frederick Barnes in the Jacobean style using decorative brickwork. The building required three stories to reach the platforms from ground level owing to the station's location on an embankment. The building is Grade II listed and is no longer in railway use. Adjacent to the station building is an original bridge over the road.

According to the Official Handbook of Stations the following classes of traffic were being handled at this station in 1956: G, P, F, L, H, C and there was a 1-ton 10 cwt crane. H Clarke & Son had a private siding.

On 4 October 1850, two stationmasters were killed by striking an overhead bridge near the station, when riding on a carriage roof with their backs to the engine.

On 12 January 1944, whilst working a goods train from Ipswich to Whitemoor, the boiler of USATC S160 Class freight loco no. 2363 exploded at the station after the firebox crown became uncovered, injuring both driver and fireman.

== Services ==
Greater Anglia operate hourly services to Cambridge and to Ipswich.

Preceding station	National Rail	Following station
Bury St Edmunds	Greater Anglia Ipswich to Ely Line	Elmswell
