= Colchester railway station =

Railway station in Essex, England

Colchester
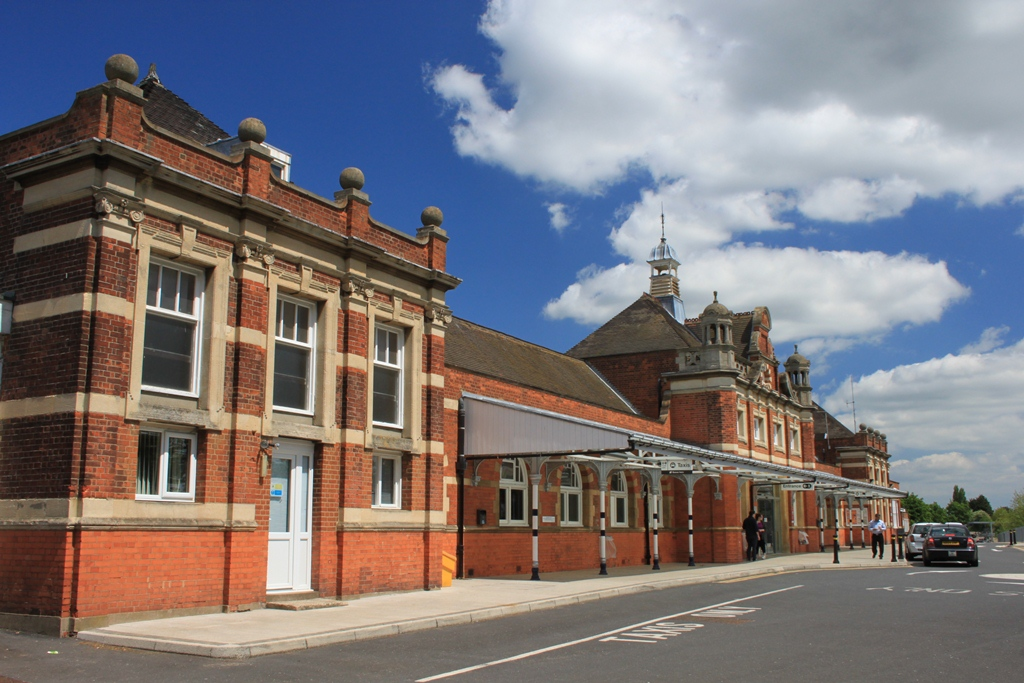
- The old station building, which is now the rear entrance

General information
- Location: Colchester, England
- Coordinates: 51°54′02.23″N 0°53′34.27″E
- Grid reference: TL990263
- Manager: Greater Anglia
- Platforms: 6

Other information
- Station code: COL
- Classification: DfT category B

History
- Original company: Eastern Counties Railway
- Pre-grouping: Great Eastern Railway
- Post-grouping: London and North Eastern Railway

Key dates
- 29 March 1843: Opened

Passengers
- 2020/21: ▼1.029 million
- Interchange: ▼0.129 million
- 2021/22: ▲2.913 million
- Interchange: ▲0.391 million
- 2022/23: ▲3.393 million
- Interchange: ▲0.451 million
- 2023/24: ▲3.719 million
- Interchange: ▲0.573 million
- 2024/25: ▼3.648 million
- Interchange: ▼0.501 million
Location
Notes
- Passenger statistics from the Office of Rail and Road

Colchester railway station (also known as Colchester North or simply North Station by residents) is a principal stop on the Great Eastern Main Line (GEML) in the East of England, and is the primary station serving the city of Colchester, Essex. Its three-letter station code is COL. It lies 51 miles 52 chains (83.1 km) down the line from London Liverpool Street and, on the GEML, is situated between Marks Tey to the west and Manningtree to the east. Colchester is also the location of a major junction where the GEML links to the Sunshine Coast Line, which runs south to Clacton-on-Sea and, via a short branch, to Walton-on-the-Naze; services to and from Colchester Town also join the GEML at the Colchester junction. The junction is grade-separated so trains branching to and from Colchester Town or the Sunshine Coast Line do not need to use the main line's tracks to cross it.

Colchester station was opened in 1843 by the Eastern Counties Railway. It is currently managed by Greater Anglia, which also operates all trains serving the station.

== History ==
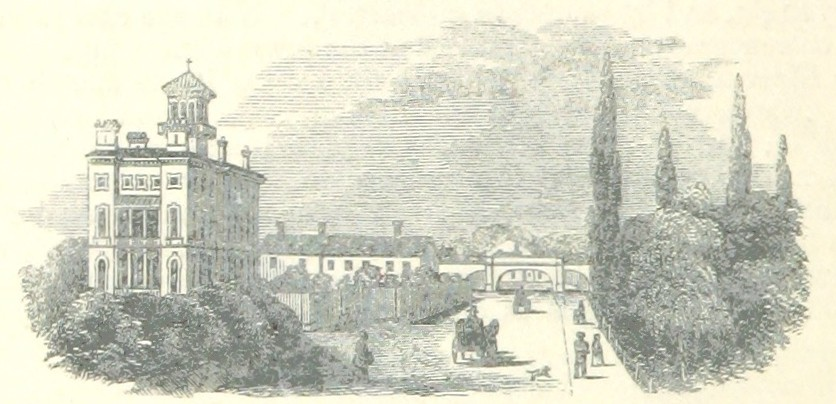
Colchester railway station in 1851, before its rebuilding in 1865

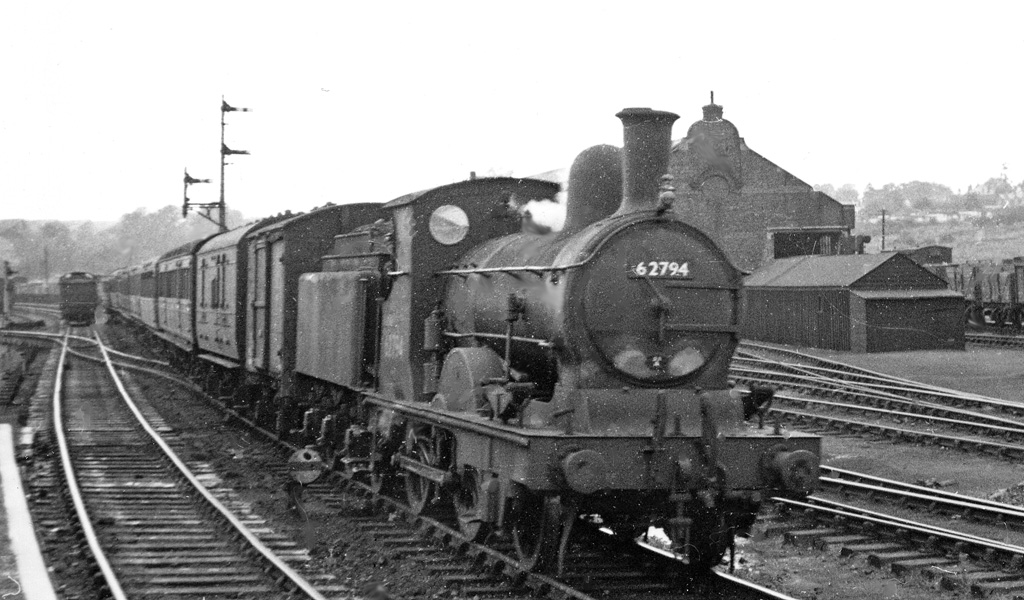
A train from Cambridge at Colchester in 1951

The station was opened on 29 March 1843 by the Eastern Counties Railway (ECR) and was named simply as Colchester. Locally, however, it is also known as Colchester North to distinguish it from Colchester Town station. Buses also use this unofficial name. Colchester station is not particularly conveniently sited for the city, but buses connect to the city centre. Colchester Town station is closer to the city centre (hence its name).

The ECR had planned to build a line from London to Norwich using a very similar route to that on which the Great Eastern Main Line operates today, but funding became a problem and apart from surveying a section onwards to Ardleigh, they were forced to abandon any further line construction.

It was three years later when the onward link to Ipswich was eventually opened by the Eastern Union Railway following intervention by business interests in Ipswich, the city having felt isolated by development of the railway to Norwich via Cambridge by the ECR.

As passenger numbers passing through the station increased, particularly with growth on the Sunshine Coast Line, the layout of the station became inadequate. This problem was heightened on summer weekends when large numbers of holiday trains destined for Clacton-on-Sea were added to the schedules. The station had also been built on a relatively sharp curve.

Prior to electrification of the lines, Colchester was modernised in 1962, with a new station building on the north side of the tracks. Following the reconstruction, the station has two main platforms. The "up" (London-bound) side comprises two platforms, numbers 3 and 4, which have an unusual layout: 3 is on the up main line and is served by intercity trains from Norwich, while 4 is on the up branch line which merges with the up main line where the two platforms join end-to-end. However, with the unusual layout of platforms, Colchester station gains the longest physical platform in the UK as the entire length (from platform 3 to 4) measures at 620 metres (2,030 ft); Gloucester station has the longest unbroken platform at 1,977 feet (603 m). The junction is protected by a trap leading to friction buffer stops. There are also bay platforms at both ends of the up main platform. The London-end bay (platform 6) is used for peak trains to and from London. Previously this platform was used for frequent services for the Sudbury Branch Line. However, most of these services were truncated to terminate at Marks Tey from the mid-1990s. The other bay platform (platform 5) is used for services to Colchester Town and Walton-on-the-Naze. The "down" side platform is an island platform with two faces, one on the down main, and one on the down branch line. Platform 1 is mainly used for Clacton-on-Sea trains and occasionally for Norwich trains.

Former train operating company Anglia Railways operated services, known as London Crosslink, from Norwich to Basingstoke via Stratford. This service started in 2000 and ended in 2002.

=== Accidents ===
- On 12 July 1913, at approximately 3 pm, an express passenger train travelling at high speed collided with a light engine at Colchester due to a signalman's error. Part of the passenger train was derailed. The train's driver, guard and fireman were killed and 14 passengers were injured. The locomotive of the express – no. 1506 of Class S69 – was so badly damaged that it was scrapped.
- On 20 December 1990, Class 312 electric multiple unit 312 714 was derailed whilst working a Clacton-on-Sea to London Liverpool Street service.

== Facilities ==
The main ticket office is a modern glass-fronted design, sited on the north side of the station, and access to the platforms is via a subway. The previous station building is on the south side and provides access to the up platform for those with tickets or wanting to buy tickets from a machine.

To the side of the main ticket office, there is a taxi rank, as well as multiple bus stops. Both entrances to the station have automatic ticket gates.

== Services ==
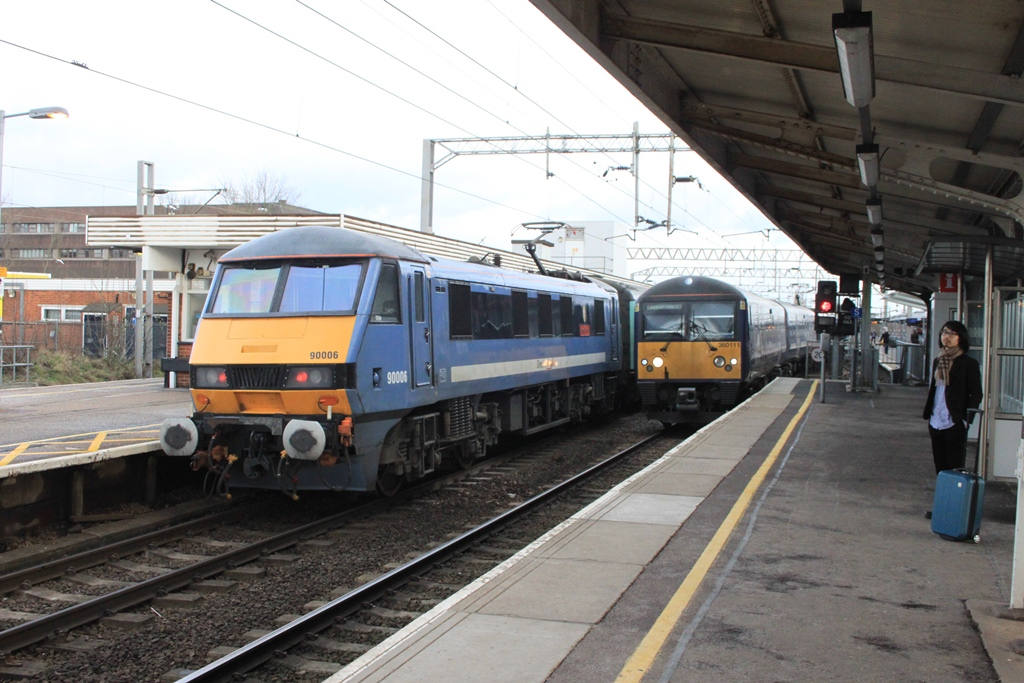
Two trains at Colchester station in February 2013

Trains are operated by Greater Anglia. The typical off-peak service, in trains per hour, comprises:

- 5 tph to London Liverpool Street
- 1 tph to Clacton-on-Sea
- 3 tph to Colchester Town, of which one continues to Walton-on-the-Naze
- 3 tph to Ipswich, of which two continue to Norwich

Additional direct services operate to Harwich International and Harwich Town, with limited through services to Peterborough via Bury St Edmunds and Sudbury via Marks Tey.

Preceding station	National Rail	Following station
Chelmsford	Greater Anglia Great Eastern Main Line; Inter-city services	Manningtree
Marks Tey	Greater Anglia Great Eastern Main Line; Stopping services	Manningtree
Terminus	Greater Anglia Sunshine Coast Line	Colchester Town
Terminus	Greater Anglia Sunshine Coast Line	Hythe
Historical railways
Witham	Anglia Railways London Crosslink	Ipswich
