= Harwich Town railway station =

Railway station in Essex, England

Harwich Town
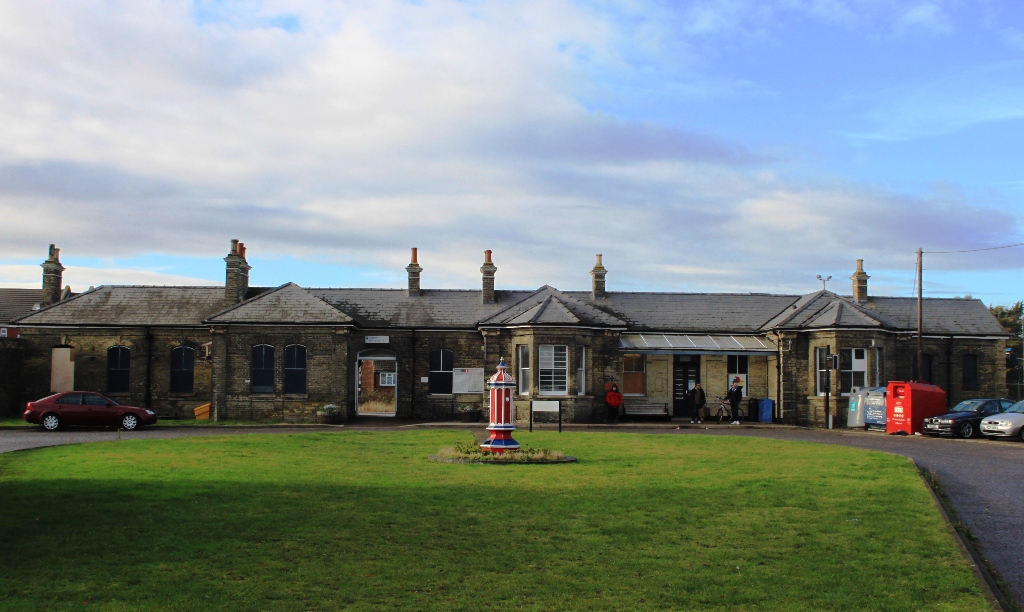

General information
- Location: Harwich, Tendring; England
- Coordinates: 51.944°N 1.287°E
- Grid reference: TM259324
- Managed by: Greater Anglia
- Platforms: 1

Other information
- Station code: HWC
- Classification: DfT category F1

Key dates
- 15 August 1854: Opened
- 1865–66: Rebuilt

Passengers
- 2020/21: ▼27,818
- 2021/22: ▲79,978
- 2022/23: ▲87,472
- 2023/24: ▲0.102 million
- 2024/25: ▲0.112 million
Location
Notes
- Passenger statistics from the Office of Rail and Road

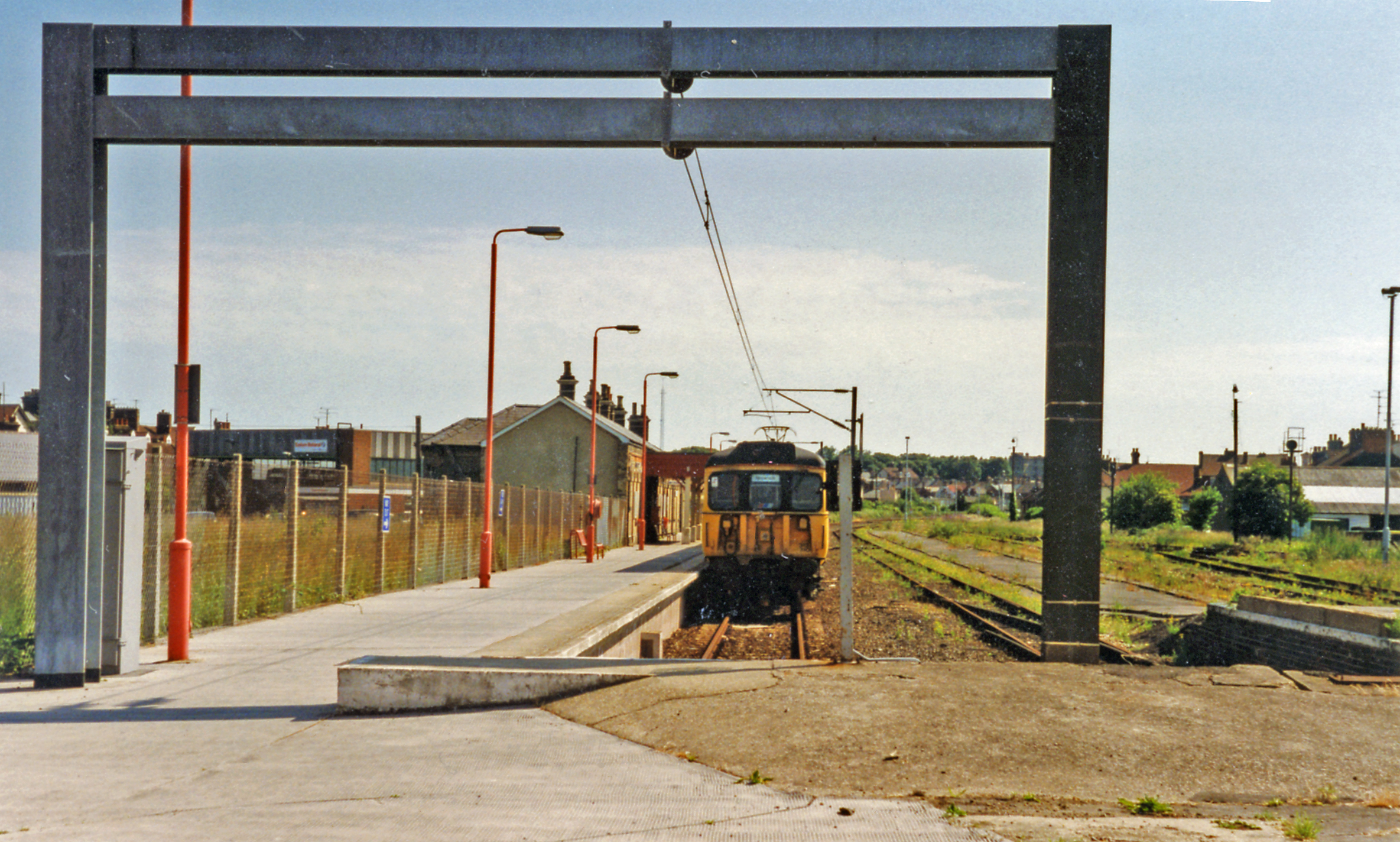
View of the terminus in June 1997

Harwich Town railway station is the eastern terminus of the Mayflower Line, a branch of the Great Eastern Main Line, in the East of England, serving the port town of Harwich, Essex. It is 70 miles 61 chains (113.88 km) from London Liverpool Street; the preceding station on the line is Dovercourt. Its three-letter station code is HWC.

The station is currently operated by Greater Anglia, which also runs all trains serving the station.

== History ==
The line to Harwich was originally opened in 1854 but the present station was built on a revised alignment by the Great Eastern Railway (GER) in 1865–66, the original station in George Street, just a short distance to the north, having burned down. The suffix "Town" was added to the station's name in 1883.

The original station had three platforms and included lines which ran directly onto the two piers from which the GER ferry services operated. The current unnumbered platform has an operational length for eight-coach trains. There was also a GER-owned hotel called The Great Eastern on the quay between the two piers. These piers became redundant when the GER opened Harwich Parkeston Quay station up-river from Harwich Town and in 1923 the new operator London and North Eastern Railway (LNER) closed the hotel.

There were also sidings and a 42 ft (12.8 m) turntable to the south-east of the rebuilt station.

The arrival/sailing of a train ferry every six hours (day and night) with each vessel bringing and sailing with 36 continental wagons which were handled over sidings on the north-west side of the station created a high level of activity, and in later years car trains were regular users of the outer platforms delivering/collecting cars for MAT Transport and delivering cars, mainly for BMC, for eventual shipment from Navyard Wharf.

The station, goods yard, and movements to and from the train ferry terminal were controlled from a signal box positioned at the southern end of the station which was in use from 1882 until December 1985 and had 50 levers.

On 15 April 2019 the station buildings opened as "The Harwich Town railway and maritime" museum.

== Services ==
As of December 2015 the typical weekday off-peak service is one train per hour to Manningtree, although there some additional services at peak times. Trains generally call at all stations along the Mayflower Line; some are extended to or from Colchester and/or London Liverpool Street.

Preceding station	National Rail	Following station
Dovercourt	Greater Anglia Mayflower Line	Terminus
