= Chappel Viaduct =

Railway viaduct in Essex, England

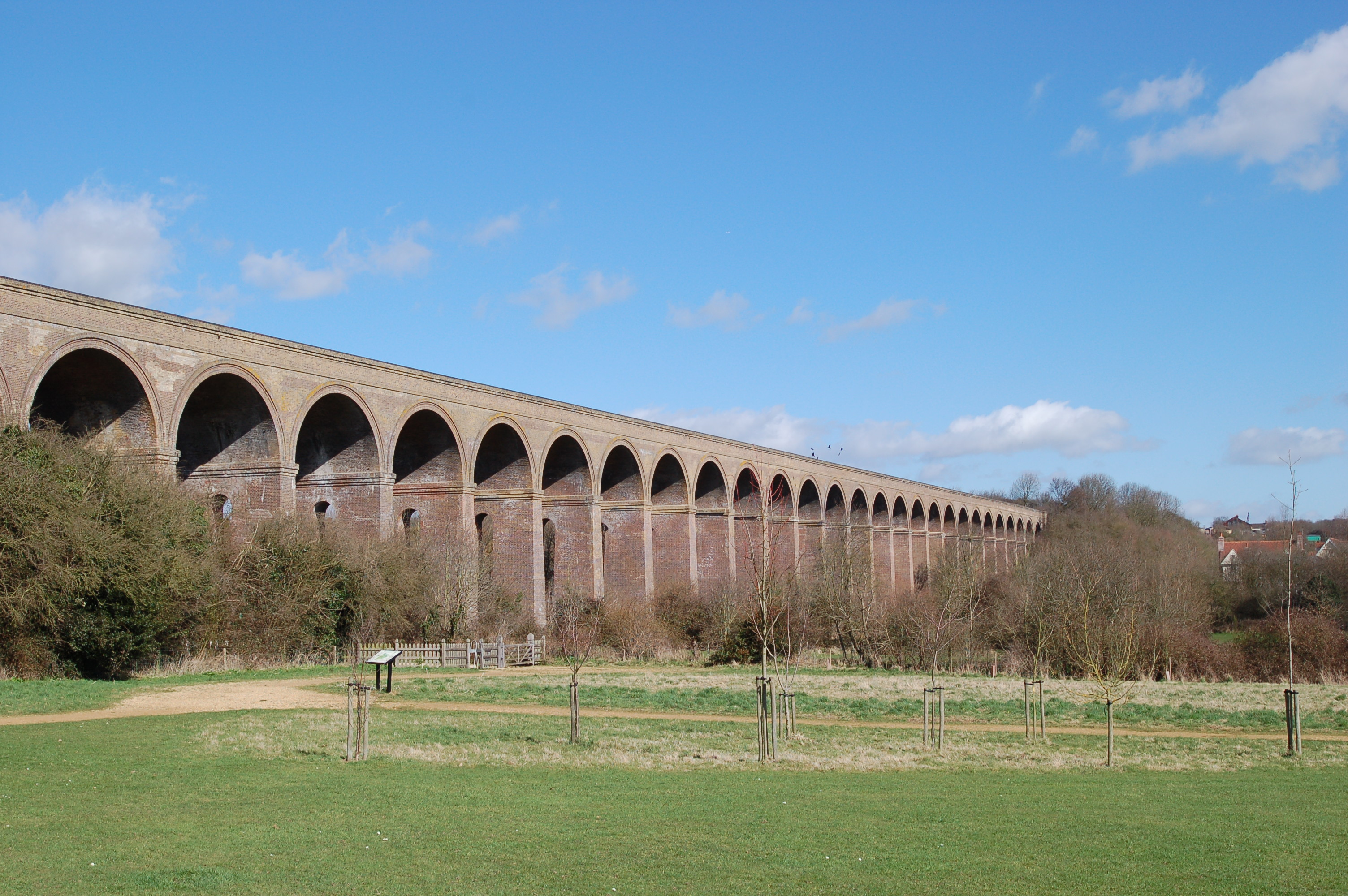
- The viaduct in 2006
- Coordinates: 51.9209°N 0.7557°E
- OS grid reference: TL896283
- Carries: Gainsborough Line
- Crosses: River Colne
- Locale: Essex, England
- Maintained by: Network Rail
- Heritage status: Listed structure

Characteristics
- Design: Viaduct
- Material: Brick
- Total length: 1,060 feet (320 m)
- Height: 75 feet (23 m)

History
- Construction start: 1847
- Construction end: 1849; 176 years ago

The Chappel Viaduct is a railway viaduct that crosses the River Colne in the Colne Valley in Essex, England. It carries the Gainsborough Line which now is a short branch linking Marks Tey in Essex to Sudbury in Suffolk. The line previously, however, extended to Shelford in Cambridgeshire.

It was completed in 1849 by the Eastern Union Railway, which was later absorbed into the Great Eastern Railway. It is the longest bridge in the East Anglia region at 1,060 feet (320 m), and one of the largest brick-built structures in the country. It was listed at Grade II in 1967.

== Description ==
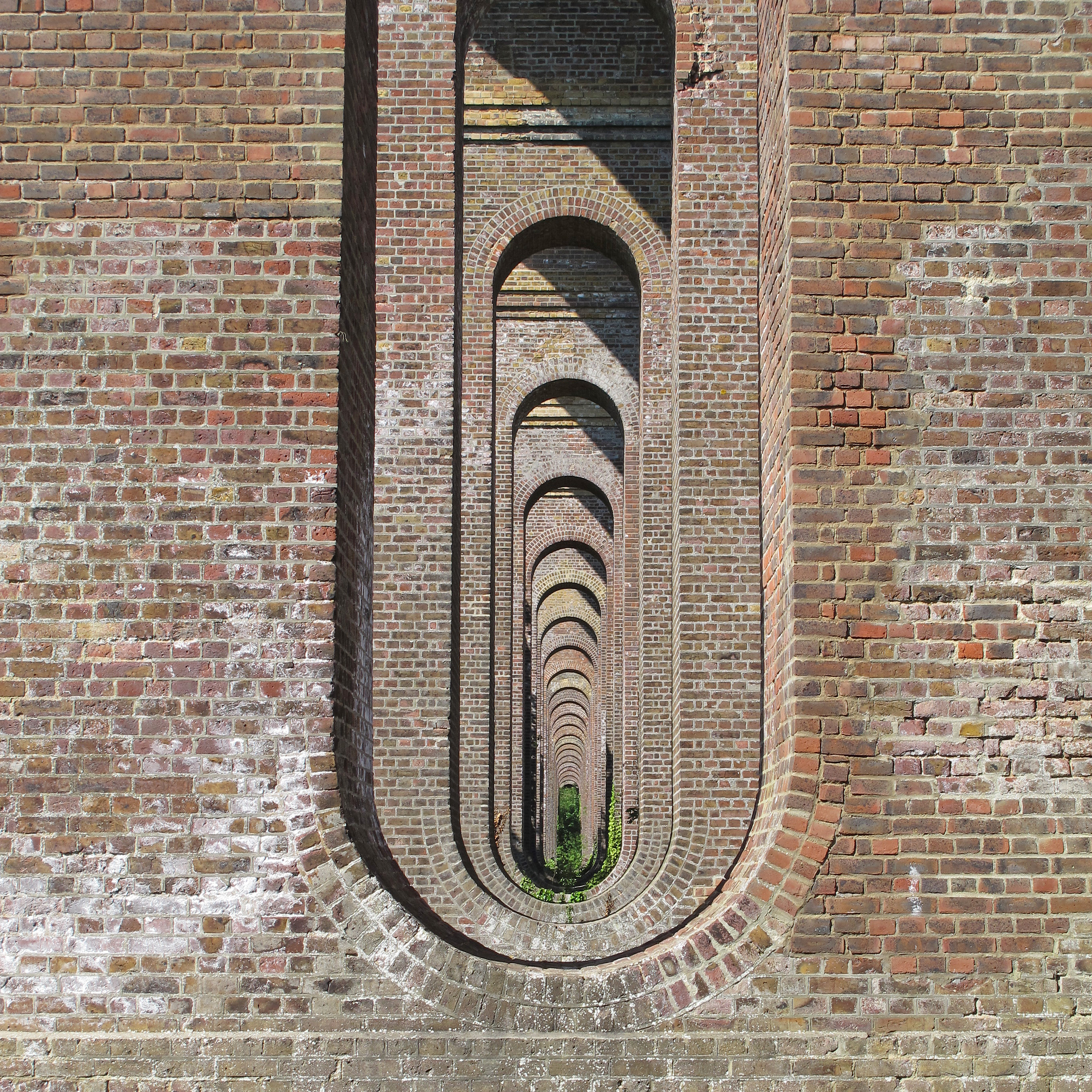
A view of the ovaloid gaps within the piers, designed to save bricks

The viaduct consists of 32 30-foot (9.1 m) semi-circular spans, with tapered piers; it is 1,060 feet (320 m) long and rises to a maximum height of 75 feet (23 m). The piers consist of two shafts, separated by a 6-foot (2 m) opening, joined at the top and bottom by arches. Each shaft contains a hollow void up to 4 feet (1.2 m) by 3 feet (1 m), partially filled with concrete to the level of the bottom arch. The running level of the viaduct has a gradient of 1 in 120.

== Construction ==
Over six million bricks used in the construction of the viaduct were made from clay excavated from the nearby village of Bures. It was built to carry a double-track railway but only a single track was laid. The bridge was built by Peter Bruff between 1847 and 1849 for the Colchester, Stour Valley, Sudbury & Halstead Railway, later part of the Great Eastern Railway.

The railway initially planned to build the viaduct with laminated timber but Bruff opted for brick to reduce the cost. He debated the cost benefits of brick compared to timber with the Great Western Railway's chief engineer Isambard Kingdom Brunel after a lecture at the Institution of Civil Engineers in 1850, Brunel being strongly in favour of using timber. Bruff went on to commission a painting of the viaduct by Frederick Brett Russell, which is now held by Ipswich Museum. Sources differ on the cost of construction; E. A. Labrum gives the cost as £21,000, while Historic England state a figure of £32,000 (both 1849).

A foundation stone in pier 21 was laid by the railway company's chairman and deputy chairman at the start of works in September 1847 and newly minted coins were placed inside as a souvenir. The stone and coins disappeared within a few hours of being placed and a bricklayer was later arrested, having tried to pay at a bar with a new half sovereign, but was not convicted of the theft due to lack of evidence.

== Listing ==
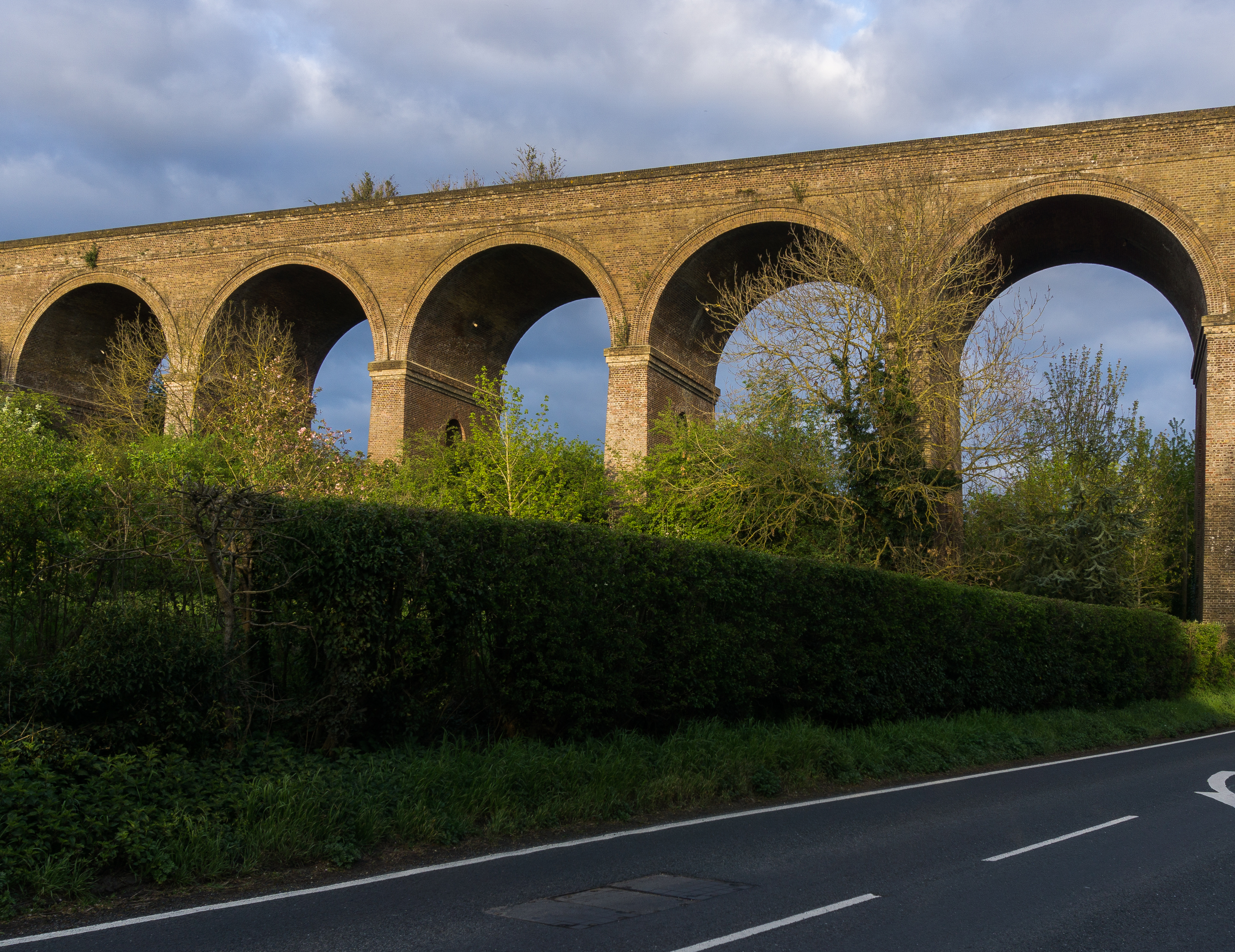
The viaduct in 2019

The viaduct was designated a Grade II listed structure on 27 November 1967. It is reportedly constructed from 7 million bricks. It is amongst the largest brick-built structures in England, after Liverpool's Stanley Dock Warehouse (27 million bricks), Battersea Power Station in London, and Stockport Viaduct and Ouse Valley Viaduct which used approximately 11 million bricks each.

== See also ==
- List of railway bridges and viaducts in the United Kingdom
