= Cavendish railway station =

Disused railway station in England

Coordinates: 52.0868°N 0.6415°E

Cavendish
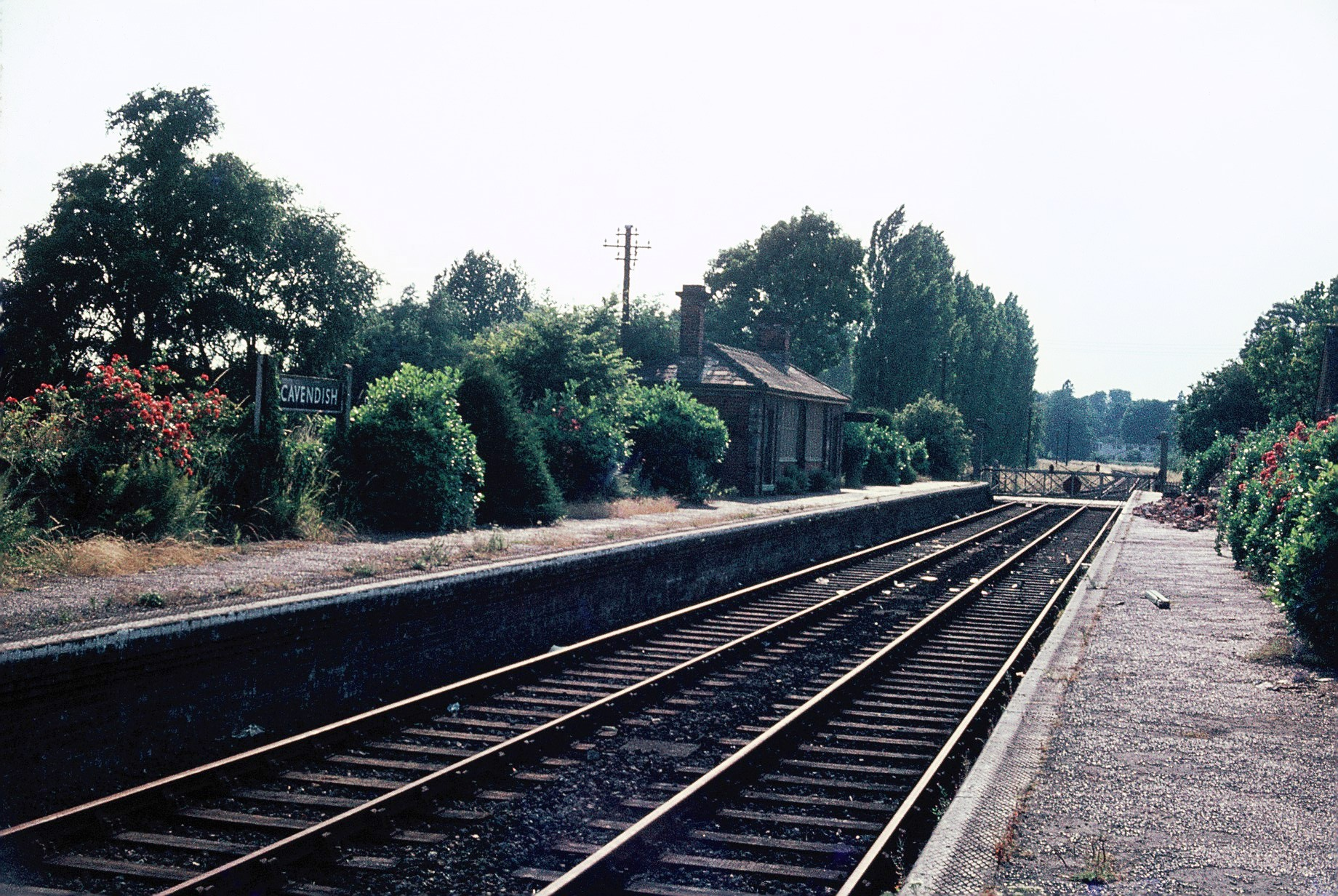
- Cavendish railway station (1970)

General information
- Location: Cavendish, West Suffolk; England
- Platforms: 2

Other information
- Status: Disused

History
- Pre-grouping: Great Eastern Railway
- Post-grouping: London and North Eastern Railway

Key dates
- 9 August 1865: Opened
- 6 March 1967: Closed
Location

Cavendish railway station was a station that served the village of Cavendish in Suffolk, England. It opened in 1865 on the Stour Valley Railway between Sudbury and Cambridge.

The station and line closed in 1967 as part of the Beeching cuts.

Preceding station	Disused railways	Following station
Clare; Line and station closed	Great Eastern Railway; Stour Valley Railway	Glemsford; Line and station closed
