= Gainsborough line =

Rural railway line in Essex and Suffolk, England

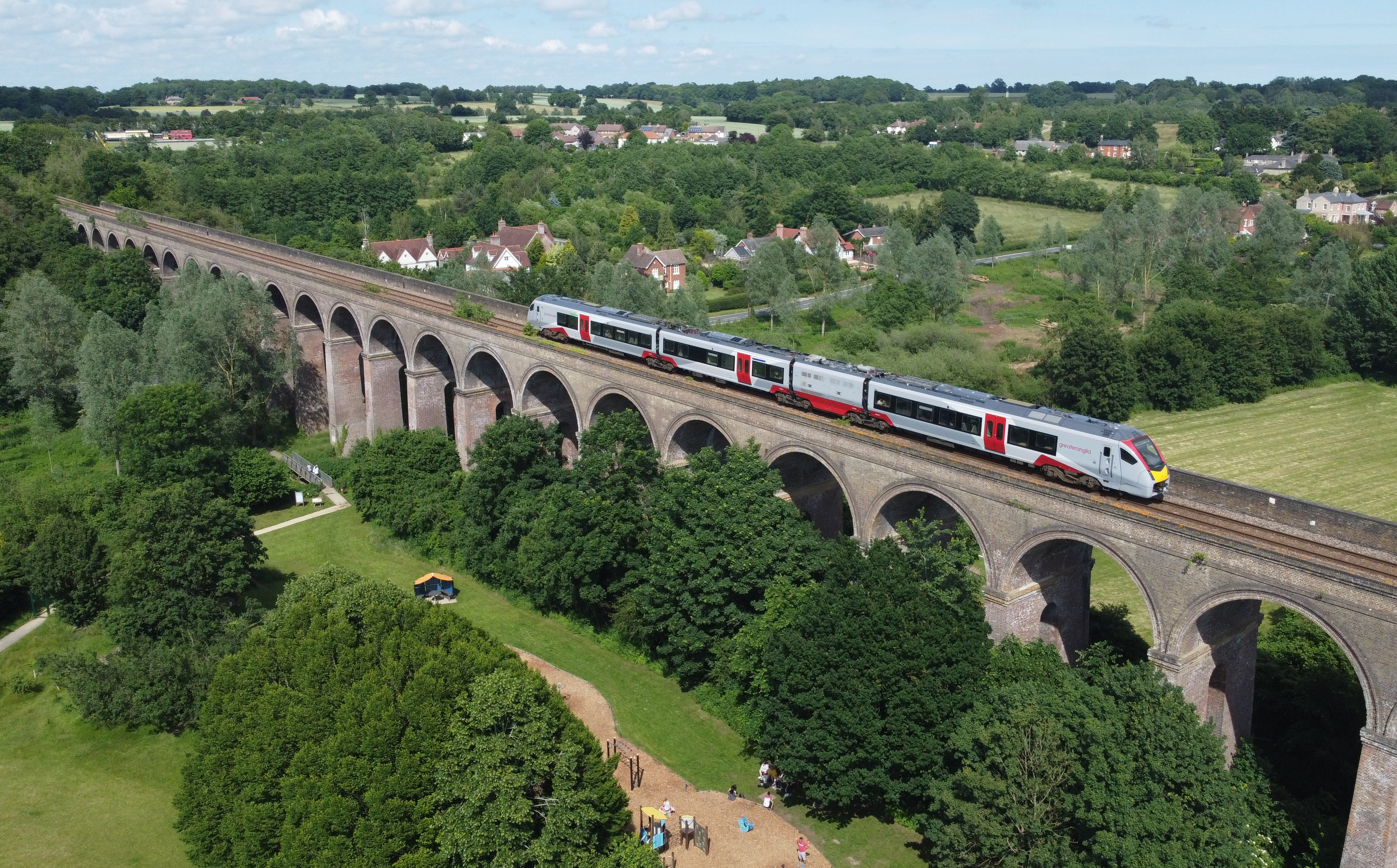
- A section of the line carried by Chappel Viaduct

Overview
- Owner: Network Rail
- Locale: Essex and Suffolk

Service
- Type: Community rail
- System: National Rail
- Operator: Greater Anglia
- Rolling stock: Class 755 "FLIRT"

Technical
- Line length: 11 miles 53 chains (18.77 km)
- Number of tracks: 1
- Track gauge: 4 ft 8 1/2 in (1,435 mm) standard gauge
- Loading gauge: W6
Route map
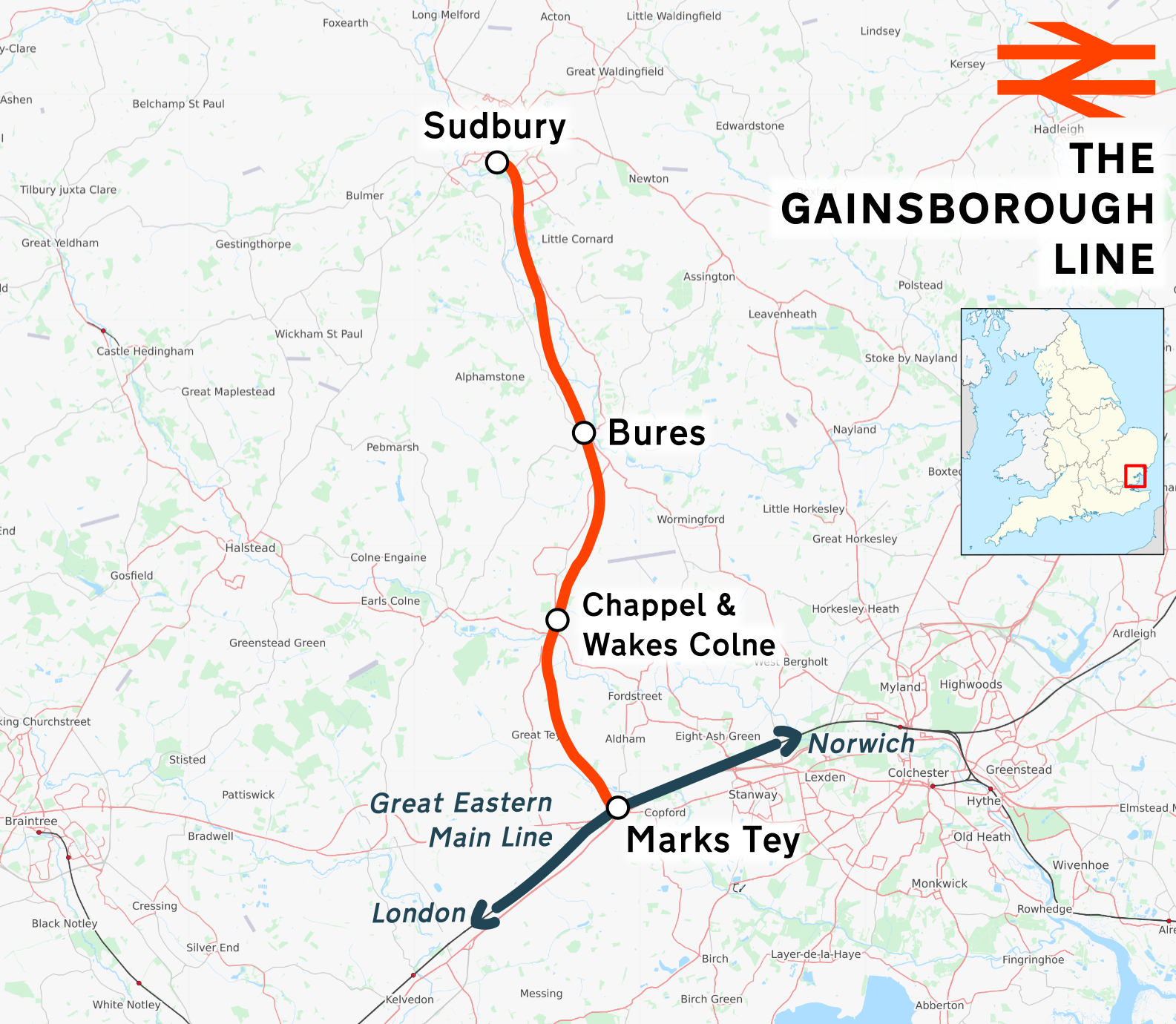
(Click to expand)

The Gainsborough line is the current marketing name of the Sudbury branch line, a railway branch line off the Great Eastern Main Line in the east of England, that links Marks Tey in Essex with Sudbury in Suffolk. It is 11 miles 53 chains (18.77 km) in length and single-track throughout. The line's Engineer's Line Reference is SUD.

Prior to the Beeching cuts initiated in the 1960s, the line, then known as the Stour Valley Railway, continued beyond Sudbury to Shelford in Cambridgeshire. Today the line is part of the Network Rail Strategic Route 7, SRS 07.10, and is classified as a rural line.

As of December 2016 the stations and all trains serving them are operated by Greater Anglia. The typical service frequency is one train per hour in each direction, with a timetabled journey time between one terminus and the other of 19 minutes.

== History ==
The Stour Valley Railway opened on 9 August 1865, linking Shelford near Cambridge with Marks Tey in Essex, with 13 intermediate stations along the line.

The first section between Sudbury and Marks Tey was opened as the Colchester, Stour Valley, Sudbury & Halstead Railway on 2 July 1849 and was taken over by the Eastern Counties Railway on 7 August 1862.

The section between Shelford and Sudbury was closed on 6 March 1967 following the Beeching cuts, leaving Bures and Chappel & Wakes Colne as the only stops between the termini.

In 2005 the line received around £3 million of investment, which saw around 5 miles (8 km) of old jointed track replaced with new continuous welded rail. Further investment was made in 2006 to replace around 6 miles (10 km) of track, leaving just the Chappel viaduct and Lamarsh to Sudbury sections in need of modernisation. This work was completed in 2007.

In 2006 the line was designated as a community railway by the transport minister and is part of the Essex and South Suffolk Community Rail Partnership.

The current name of the line commemorates the painter Thomas Gainsborough, who was born in Sudbury; the previous name was the Lovejoy line, after the television series Lovejoy, which was filmed in the Sudbury area.

All passenger services on the line are currently operated by Greater Anglia, which runs an hourly service in each direction. The last departure from Sudbury at the end of each day is extended to Colchester.

== Notable sight ==
The line runs across the Chappel viaduct, which has 30 arches each with a 35-foot (11 m) span, with a maximum height of 75 feet (23 m), and was the longest viaduct on the Great Eastern Railway.

The East Anglian Railway Museum is located alongside the station at Chappel & Wakes Colne.

== Infrastructure ==
The line is single track throughout, has a loading gauge of W6, and a maximum speed of 50 miles per hour (80 km/h). Unlike other branches in the area, such as the Braintree branch line and Mayflower line to Harwich Town, the Gainsborough line is not electrified. New Class 755 bi-mode trains started operating on the line in January 2020.

=== Stations ===
The following table summarises the line's four stations, their distance measured from London Liverpool Street, and estimated number of passenger entries/exits in 2018–19:

Station	Location	Local authority	Mileage	Patronage
Marks Tey	Marks Tey	City of Colchester	46 1/2	604,902
Chappel & Wakes Colne	Chappel, Wakes Colne	City of Colchester	50 1/4	39,360
Bures	Bures	District of Braintree	53 1/2	60,432
Sudbury	Sudbury	District of Babergh	58 1/2	334,274

== Accidents and incidents ==
- On 12 July 1887 one person was killed at Bures when part of a runaway train collided with a crossing gate.
- On 27 January 2006 at least four passengers were slightly injured when a Class 156 train ran into the buffer stop at Sudbury. The 6:05 pm service from Marks Tey was travelling at a speed at the time of the collision of approximately six miles per hour. An investigation determined that the driver failed to apply the brakes in a "timely and appropriate manner".
- On 17 August 2010 the Little Cornard derailment occurred when the 5:31 pm service from Sudbury collided with a lorry that had entered a level crossing without permission. The train driver and four passengers were seriously injured in the accident.
