= Glemsford railway station =

Former railway station in England

Coordinates: 52.0868°N 0.6721°E

Glemsford
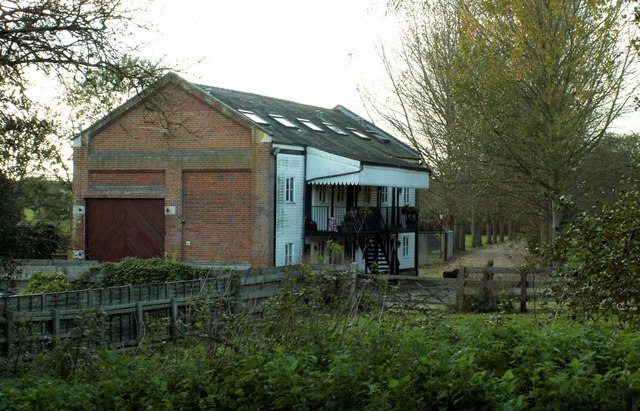
- Former goods shed now converted into living accommodation

General information
- Location: Glemsford, Babergh; England
- Platforms: 2

Other information
- Status: Disused

History
- Pre-grouping: Great Eastern Railway
- Post-grouping: London and North Eastern Railway

Key dates
- 9 August 1865: Opened
- 6 March 1967: Closed
Location

Glemsford railway station was a station that served the village of Glemsford in Suffolk, England. It opened in 1865 on the Stour Valley Railway between Sudbury and Cambridge.

The station and line closed in 1967 as part of the Beeching cuts.

Preceding station	Disused railways	Following station
Cavendish; Line and station closed	Great Eastern Railway; Stour Valley Railway	Long Melford; Line and station closed
