= Listed buildings in Bures St. Mary =

Civil Parish in Suffolk, England

Bures St Mary is a village and civil parish in the Babergh District of Suffolk, England. It contains 56 listed buildings that are recorded in the National Heritage List for England. Of these two are grade I, five are grade II* and 49 are grade II.

This list is based on the information retrieved online from Historic England.

== Key ==
Grade	Criteria
I	Buildings that are of exceptional interest
II*	Particularly important buildings of more than special interest
II	Buildings that are of special interest

== Listing ==
Name	Grade	Location	Type	Completed (Note: The date given is the date used by Historic England as significant for the initial building or that of an important part in the structure's description.)	Date designated	Grid ref. (Note: The grid reference is based on the British national grid reference system, sometimes known as OSGB36, used by the Ordnance Survey.) Geo-coordinates	Notes	Entry number (Note: The "List Entry Number" is a unique number assigned to each listed building and scheduled monument by Historic England.)	Image	Wikidata
Fysh House	II	Assington Road, Bures St. Mary			9 February 1978	TL9136634708; 51°58′40″N 0°47′06″E		1285617	Upload Photo	Q26574295
8 and 9, Bridge Street	II	8 and 9, Bridge Street, Bures St. Mary			9 February 1978	TL9066534062; 51°58′20″N 0°46′28″E		1194623	Upload Photo	Q26489240
10, Bridge Street	II	10, Bridge Street, Bures St. Mary			9 February 1978	TL9067334062; 51°58′20″N 0°46′28″E		1036712	Upload Photo	Q26288393
11, Bridge Street	II	11, Bridge Street, Bures St. Mary			9 February 1978	TL9068034064; 51°58′20″N 0°46′29″E		1351744	Upload Photo	Q26634817
Church of St Mary the Virgin	I	Bridge Street, Bures St. Mary	church building		23 March 1961	TL9068634021; 51°58′19″N 0°46′29″E		1036711	Church of St Mary the Virgin More images	Q17541720
Maynscroft and Maynscroft Cottage	II	Bridge Street, Bures St. Mary			9 February 1978	TL9073034036; 51°58′19″N 0°46′31″E		1036668	Upload Photo	Q26288350
War Memorial	II	Bridge Street, Bures St. Mary	war memorial		4 December 2001	TL9070234045; 51°58′20″N 0°46′30″E		1389598	War Memorial More images	Q26669033
Rose Cottage	II	Bures Green, Bures St. Mary			9 February 1978	TL9123435248; 51°58′58″N 0°47′00″E		1194640	Upload Photo	Q26489256
Chapel of St Stephen	I	Bures St. Mary	chapel		10 January 1953	TL9177034441; 51°58′31″N 0°47′26″E		1351742	Chapel of St Stephen More images	Q17542527
Corn Hall	II	Bures St. Mary			31 August 1988	TL9093935781; 51°59′16″N 0°46′46″E		1233356	Upload Photo	Q26526829
Cottage About 70 Metres East North East of Corn Hall Including Wall and Dovecote Adjoining Northeast	II	Bures St. Mary			25 September 1989	TL9101535804; 51°59′16″N 0°46′50″E		1233414	Upload Photo	Q26526885
Farm Building Range Including Adjoining Barns About 100 Metres East of Corn Hall	II	Bures St. Mary			28 February 1989	TL9104535793; 51°59′16″N 0°46′51″E		1365320	Upload Photo	Q26647016
Gazeley Gate	II	Bures St. Mary			9 February 1978	TL9302035524; 51°59′05″N 0°48′34″E		1351743	Upload Photo	Q26634816
Little Mill House (about 400 Metres West North West of Smallbridge Hall)	II	Bures St. Mary			28 February 1989	TL9250233191; 51°57′50″N 0°48′02″E		1276328	Upload Photo	Q26565845
Moat Farmhouse	II	Bures St. Mary			9 April 1990	TL9194634993; 51°58′49″N 0°47′37″E		1033465	Upload Photo	Q26284947
Over Hall	II	Bures St. Mary			15 October 1996	TL9296134992; 51°58′48″N 0°48′30″E		1268175	Upload Photo	Q26558515
Smallbridge Hall	II*	Bures St. Mary	house		10 January 1953	TL9293933065; 51°57′45″N 0°48′25″E		1194489	Smallbridge Hall More images	Q7543626
Stables to the North of Smallbridge Hall	II	Bures St. Mary			9 February 1978	TL9291733182; 51°57′49″N 0°48′24″E		1036710	Upload Photo	Q26288391
Outbuildings to the South West of the Vicarage	II	Church Square, Bures St. Mary			9 February 1978	TL9069733943; 51°58′16″N 0°46′29″E		1351764	Upload Photo	Q26634836
Post Office	II	Church Square, Bures St. Mary			9 February 1978	TL9073134010; 51°58′19″N 0°46′31″E		1036669	Upload Photo	Q26288351
Tanchin and Bondi	II	Church Square, Bures St. Mary			9 February 1978	TL9074234012; 51°58′19″N 0°46′32″E		1351763	Upload Photo	Q26634835
The Vicarage	II	Church Square, Bures St. Mary			9 February 1978	TL9072333936; 51°58′16″N 0°46′31″E		1036670	Upload Photo	Q26288352
White Horse House	II	5, Cuckoo Hill, Bures St. Mary			9 February 1978	TL9093434258; 51°58′26″N 0°46′42″E		1351765	Upload Photo	Q26634837
Spout House	II	Cuckoo Hill, Bures St. Mary			9 February 1978	TL9087334230; 51°58′26″N 0°46′39″E		1036671	Upload Photo	Q26288353
Angel Inn	II	High Street, Bures St. Mary			10 January 1953	TL9068834115; 51°58′22″N 0°46′29″E		1036672	Upload Photo	Q26288354
Baytree House	II	High Street, Bures St. Mary			9 February 1978	TL9080434204; 51°58′25″N 0°46′35″E		1036674	Upload Photo	Q26288356
Bures Baptist Church	II	High Street, Bures St. Mary			9 February 1978	TL9080134154; 51°58′23″N 0°46′35″E		1036678	Upload Photo	Q26288359
Chapel Cottages	II	High Street, Bures St. Mary			9 February 1978	TL9081534182; 51°58′24″N 0°46′36″E		1036679	Upload Photo	Q26288360
Crown	II	High Street, Bures St. Mary			9 February 1978	TL9073734137; 51°58′23″N 0°46′32″E		1036676	Upload Photo	Q26288358
Junipers	II	High Street, Bures St. Mary			9 February 1978	TL9084834236; 51°58′26″N 0°46′38″E		1036675	Upload Photo	Q26288357
Malthouse and Premises Occupied by W A Church (bures) Ltd	II*	High Street, Bures St. Mary	malt house		10 January 1953	TL9078534135; 51°58′23″N 0°46′34″E		1036677	Malthouse and Premises Occupied by W A Church (bures) Ltd More images	Q17532925
Old Forge House	II	High Street, Bures St. Mary			9 February 1978	TL9075334144; 51°58′23″N 0°46′33″E		1194715	Upload Photo	Q26489329
Sunday School to Bures Baptist Church	II	High Street, Bures St. Mary			9 February 1978	TL9081034165; 51°58′23″N 0°46′36″E		1194750	Upload Photo	Q26489362
Tadworth	II	High Street, Bures St. Mary			9 February 1978	TL9083334217; 51°58′25″N 0°46′37″E		1351767	Upload Photo	Q26634838
The Manse	II	High Street, Bures St. Mary			9 February 1978	TL9084334220; 51°58′25″N 0°46′37″E		1194700	Upload Photo	Q26489313
The Old Bakery	II*	High Street, Bures St. Mary	architectural structure		10 January 1973	TL9075934171; 51°58′24″N 0°46′33″E		1351766	The Old Bakery More images	Q17534617
Tudor Cottage and Shop	II	High Street, Bures St. Mary			10 January 1953	TL9071434139; 51°58′23″N 0°46′31″E		1036673	Upload Photo	Q26288355
Bures Mill	II	Mill Lane, Bures, St Mary Bures, CO8 5FE, Bures St. Mary			10 January 1953	TL9113033512; 51°58′02″N 0°46′51″E		1285546	Upload Photo	Q26574233
Nether Hall	II	Mill Lane, Bures, St Mary Bures, CO8 5FE, Bures St. Mary			9 February 1978	TL9101833580; 51°58′04″N 0°46′45″E		1036682	Upload Photo	Q26288363
The Mill	II	Mill Lane, Bures, St Mary Bures, Bures St. Mary			10 January 1953	TL9114633510; 51°58′02″N 0°46′52″E		1351768	Upload Photo	Q26634839
1, Nayland Road	II	1, Nayland Road, Bures St. Mary			9 February 1978	TL9079034032; 51°58′19″N 0°46′34″E		1285545	Upload Photo	Q26574232
2-4, Nayland Road	II	2-4, Nayland Road, Bures St. Mary			23 March 1961	TL9079334023; 51°58′19″N 0°46′34″E		1036680	Upload Photo	Q26288361
5-7, Nayland Road	II	5-7, Nayland Road, Bures St. Mary			23 March 1961	TL9080134011; 51°58′19″N 0°46′35″E		1036681	Upload Photo	Q26288362
Bures House	II	Nayland Road, Bures St. Mary			9 February 1978	TL9078933953; 51°58′17″N 0°46′34″E		1194758	Upload Photo	Q26489370
Hold Farmhouse	II	Nayland Road, Bures St. Mary			30 April 1987	TL9220433974; 51°58′16″N 0°47′48″E		1351943	Upload Photo	Q26635005
Malting Cottage	II	Nayland Road, Bures, CO8 5BL, Bures St. Mary			9 February 1978	TL9327233895; 51°58′12″N 0°48′44″E		1036683	Upload Photo	Q26288364
Abram Constables	II	Sudbury Road, Bures St. Mary			9 February 1978	TL9039136052; 51°59′25″N 0°46′17″E		1194801	Upload Photo	Q26489418
Allens Farmhouse	II	Sudbury Road, Bures St. Mary			9 February 1978	TL9008436298; 51°59′33″N 0°46′02″E		1036686	Upload Photo	Q26288366
Barn to the North of Great Bevills	II	Sudbury Road, Bures St. Mary			16 April 1971	TL9079734911; 51°58′48″N 0°46′36″E		1351769	Upload Photo	Q26634840
Barns to the North of High Pale Farmhouse	II	Sudbury Road, Bures St. Mary			9 February 1978	TL9057635748; 51°59′15″N 0°46′26″E		1036685	Upload Photo	Q26288365
Dunstead House	II	Sudbury Road, Bures St. Mary			9 February 1978	TL8995836238; 51°59′32″N 0°45′55″E		1285529	Upload Photo	Q26574216
Great Bevills	II*	Sudbury Road, Bures St. Mary			10 January 1953	TL9080034868; 51°58′46″N 0°46′36″E		1036684	Upload Photo	Q17532939
High Pale Farmhouse	II	Sudbury Road, Bures St. Mary			9 February 1978	TL9059535721; 51°59′14″N 0°46′27″E		1194789	Upload Photo	Q26489405
Spread Eagle	II	Sudbury Road, Bures St. Mary			9 February 1978	TL9070834737; 51°58′42″N 0°46′31″E		1194777	Upload Photo	Q26489388
Woolman's Farmhouse	II	Sudbury Road, Bures St. Mary			9 February 1978	TL9032136082; 51°59′26″N 0°46′14″E		1351770	Upload Photo	Q26634841
Sawyer's Farmhouse	II*	Upper Road, Bures St. Mary, Little Cornard			9 February 1978	TL9068737192; 52°00′01″N 0°46′35″E		1036687	Upload Photo	Q17532951

== See also ==
- Grade I listed buildings in Suffolk
- Grade II* listed buildings in Suffolk

== Sources ==
- Bettely, James; Pevsner, Nikolaus (2015) [1961], Suffolk: West, The Buildings of England, New Haven and London: Yale University Press, ISBN 978-0-300-19655-9
