= Shelford railway station =

Railway station in Cambridgeshire, England

Coordinates: 52.149°N 0.140°E

Shelford
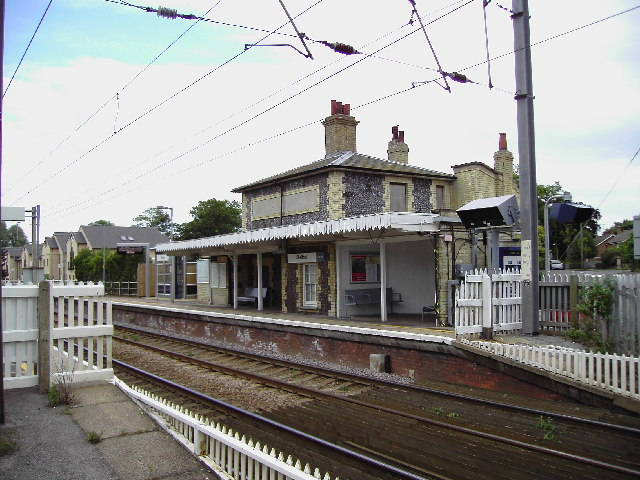

General information
- Location: Great Shelford, District of South Cambridgeshire; England
- Grid reference: TL465522
- Owner: Network Rail
- Manager: Greater Anglia
- Platforms: 2

Other information
- Station code: SED
- Classification: DfT category E

History
- Opened: 1845

Passengers
- 2020/21: ▼57,942
- 2021/22: ▲0.141 million
- 2022/23: ▲0.170 million
- 2023/24: ▲0.207 million
- 2024/25: ▲0.222 million
Location
Notes
- Passenger statistics from the Office of Rail and Road

Shelford railway station is on the West Anglia Main Line serving the villages of Great Shelford, Little Shelford and Stapleford in Cambridgeshire, England. It is 52 miles 36 chains (84.4 km) down the line from London Liverpool Street and is situated between Whittlesford Parkway and Cambridge South. Its three-letter station code is SED.

The station and all trains calling are operated by Greater Anglia.

== History ==
The station was opened by the Eastern Counties Railway in 1845 and later became a junction with the opening of the Stour Valley Railway from Haverhill on 1 June 1865. The subsequent completion of the line onwards to Sudbury a few months later created a through link with Colchester on the Great Eastern Main Line. This was used by through holiday trains between Clacton-on-Sea and the Midlands in LNER and British Rail days but then fell victim to the Beeching Axe, closing to all traffic on 6 March 1967. However, the line between Sudbury and Marks Tey is still in use today.

Eminent theatre director Sir Peter Hall lived here in his early life when his father Reginald Hall was the stationmaster.

== Services ==
All services at Shelford are operated by Greater Anglia using Class 720 EMUs.

The typical off-peak service in trains per hour is:

- 1 tph to London Liverpool Street
- 1 tph to Cambridge North

During the peak hours, the service is increased to 2 tph in each direction. The station is also served by a small number of peak hour services to and from Ely.

| Preceding station | National Rail | Following station |
|---|---|---|
| Whittlesford Parkway | Greater Anglia West Anglia Main Line | Cambridge South |
| | Disused railways | |
| Pampisford Line and station closed | Great Eastern Railway Stour Valley Railway | Cambridge Line and station open |
