= Clare railway station =

Disused railway station in England

Clare
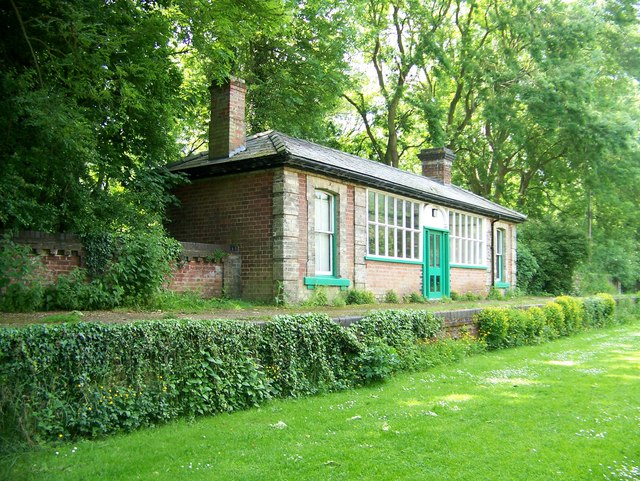
- Clare railway station in 2008

General information
- Location: Clare, West Suffolk; England
- Coordinates: 52.0768°N 0.5846°E
- Platforms: 2

Other information
- Status: Disused

History
- Original company: Great Eastern Railway
- Post-grouping: London and North Eastern Railway

Key dates
- 9 August 1865: Opened
- 6 March 1967: Closed
Location

Clare railway station was a station that served the town of Clare in Suffolk, England. It opened in 1865 on the Stour Valley Railway between Sudbury and Cambridge.

The station and line closed in 1967 as part of the Beeching cuts.

The platforms, station building, waiting room and a goods shed are within the Clare Castle Country Park.

Preceding station	Disused railways	Following station
Stoke; Line and station closed	Great Eastern Railway; Stour Valley Railway	Cavendish; Line and station closed
