= Chappel =

Village in Essex, England

Coordinates: 51.9175°N 0.7525°E

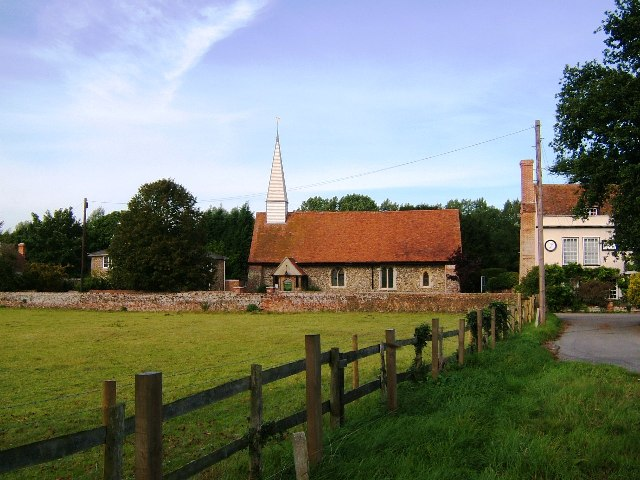
- St Barnabas Church

- Location within Essex
- Population: 530 (Parish, 2021)
- OS grid reference: TL895279
- District: City of Colchester
- Shire county: Essex
- Region: East
- Country: England
- Sovereign state: United Kingdom
- Post town: Colchester
- Postcode district: CO6
- Dialling code: 01206 2 and 01787 2
- Police: Essex
- Fire: Essex
- Ambulance: East of England
- UK Parliament: Harwich and North Essex

Chappel is a village and civil parish in the City of Colchester district of Essex, England. The River Colne flows through the village. It is significant for its Victorian viaduct, which crosses the Colne valley. At the 2021 census the parish had a population of 530.

== Name and history ==
The present name of Chappel derives from the construction of a small chapel of ease, noted in 1285 AD as standing at the northern boundary of the parish of Great Tey. During the 16th century, because of concerns from Chappel residents about the distance to Great Tey's own church at festival time, this area was split from the parish and become a separate entity known as Pontisbright (lit. "Britric's bridge") that would eventually become known as Chappel.

In 1433, the vicar of Great Tey agreed that the inhabitants of Chappel could find and elect their own chaplain. The benefice itself was united with that of the neighbouring village of Wakes Colne in 1938. The chapel itself, now the parish church of St Barnabas, is a grade I listed building.

== Chappel Viaduct ==
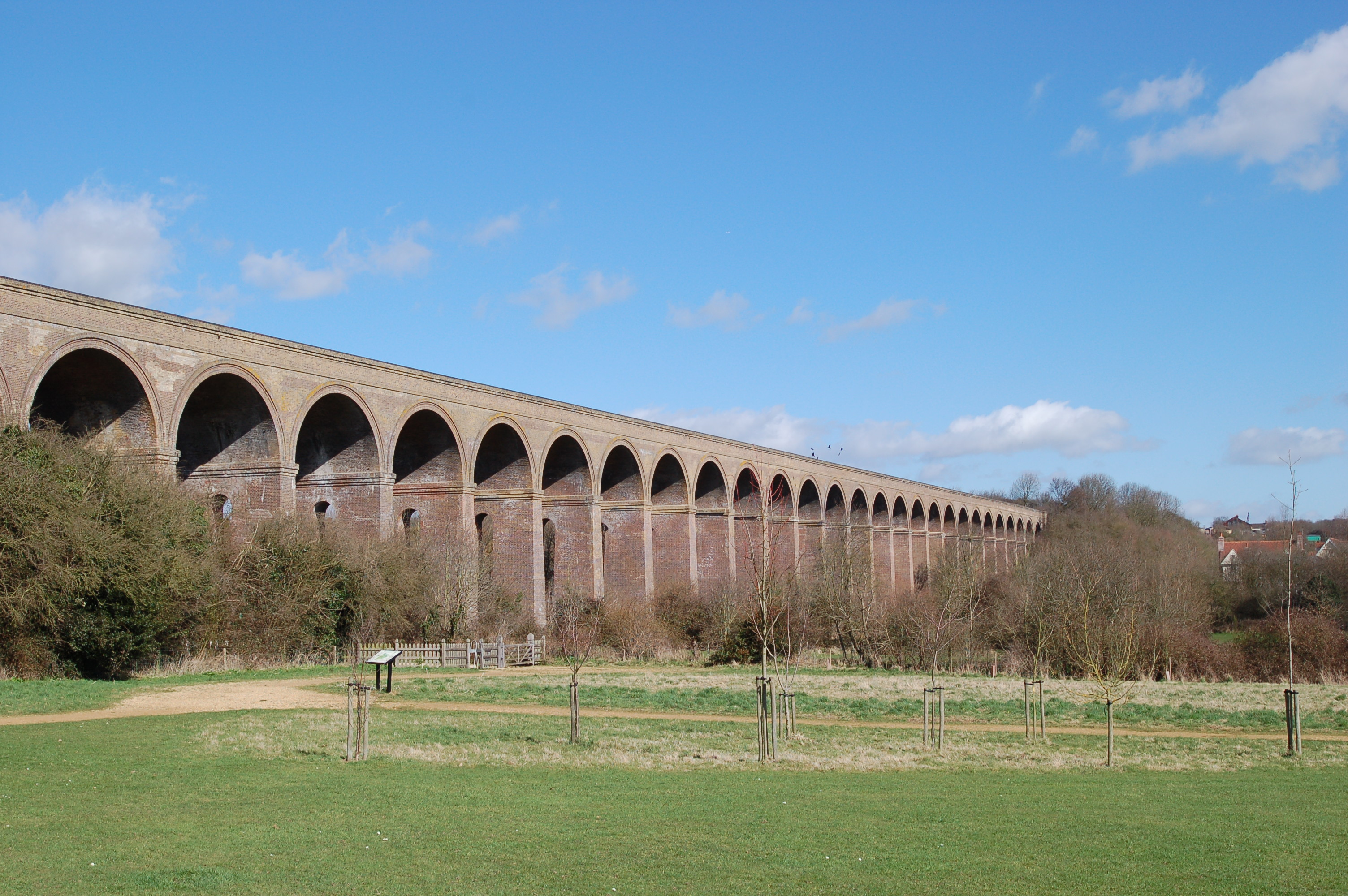
Chappel's Victorian railway viaduct.

The Chappel viaduct was built between 1847 and 1849 for the Colchester and Stour extension of the Eastern Counties Railway. Originally planned to be a timber structure, the viaduct was built of locally made brick because of the additional cost of maintaining a timber structure. Approximately 600 men were involved in the construction, most of whom were local East Anglians. The cost of construction was approximately £21,000 (approximately £2.2 million in 2016 money).

The viaduct consists of 32 arches of 30 feet (9 m) span, with a total length of 1,136 feet (346 m), and a maximum height of 80 feet (24 m). The piers consist of two shafts, separated by a 6 feet (2 m) opening, and joined at top and bottom by arches; each shaft contain a hollow void 4 feet (1.2 m) by 3 feet (1 m) maximum, partially filled with concrete to the level of the bottom arch. The running level of the viaduct has a gradient of 1 in 120

The viaduct became a listed monument in 1967, and is thought to be one of the largest brick-built structures in England after Ouse Valley Viaduct in Sussex and Battersea Power Station.

During the commemoration events to mark 50 years since the end of the Second World War, Chappel's beacon was transported by rail to a point on the viaduct where it could be seen from the playing field below, and lit after a ceremonial silence, the beginning and end of which were marked by the release of two maroons.

The first passenger train to Sudbury, carrying an official party from Colchester, ran on 2 July 1849. The viaduct currently carries the Marks Tey to Sudbury branch railway (Gainsborough Line), which connects regularly with trains to and from London's Liverpool Street Station.

== Amenities ==
The village has a pub dating from the 14th century, a parish church, a United Reformed church, a post office and general store, village hall and a railway station, Chappel and Wakes Colne station, which houses the East Anglian Railway Museum. It also has a children's play area which was upgraded in 2007-08 by Chappel Parish Council.

In celebration of the millennium, the Chappel Millennium Green was opened. The Millennium Green has two areas: a nature reserve with board walk and a mown grass area for general recreation is bordered by a gravel path. It has also hosted several events, including the burning of a beacon and Colne Valley Festival events.

== Village sign ==
Chappel's village sign depicts a bridge crossing a river, symbolic of the old bridge, dating from 1140 AD, which crossed the river Colne and connected the two halves of the estate of Crepping Manor. The lord of the manor was, at that time, responsible for its upkeep.

== Notable former residents ==
- Margery Allingham (1904–1966), author of fiction, mainly crime and mystery novels. "Pontisbright", the old name for Chappel, is used as a place-name in her 1933 novel Sweet Danger.
- Al Barnes (born 1968), former guitarist in the seminal Black Metal Band Venom.
