= Bures railway station =

Railway station in Essex, England

Bures
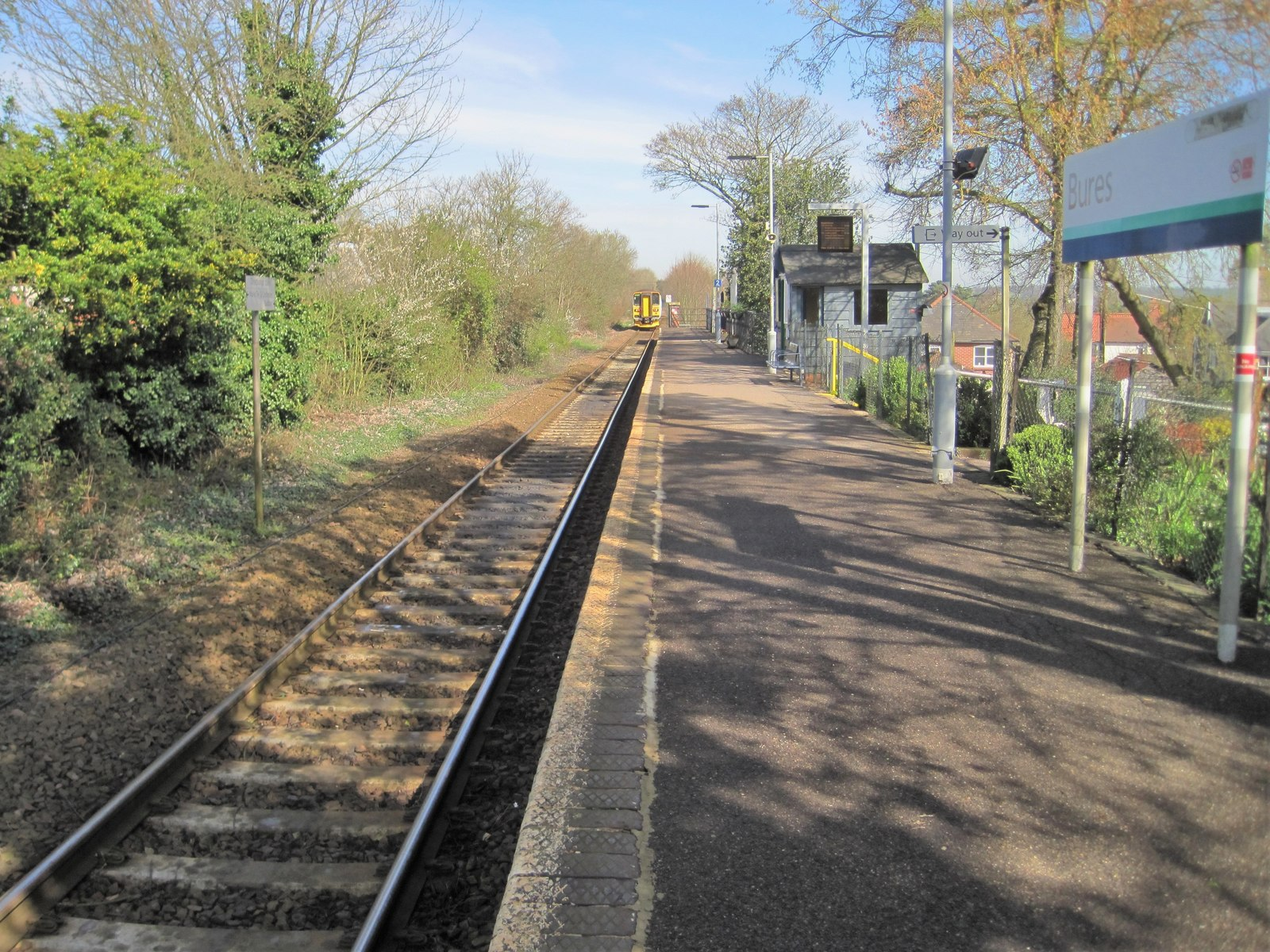
- Bures station in 2016

General information
- Location: Bures, Braintree; England
- Coordinates: 51.971°N 0.769°E
- Grid reference: TL903338
- Manager: Greater Anglia
- Platforms: 1

Other information
- Station code: BUE
- Classification: DfT category F2

History
- Opened: 2 July 1849

Passengers
- 2021/22: ▲35,712
- 2022/23: ▲45,068
- 2023/24: ▲46,312
- 2024/25: ▲53,342
- 2025/26: ▲56,076
Location
Notes
- Passenger statistics from the Office of Rail and Road

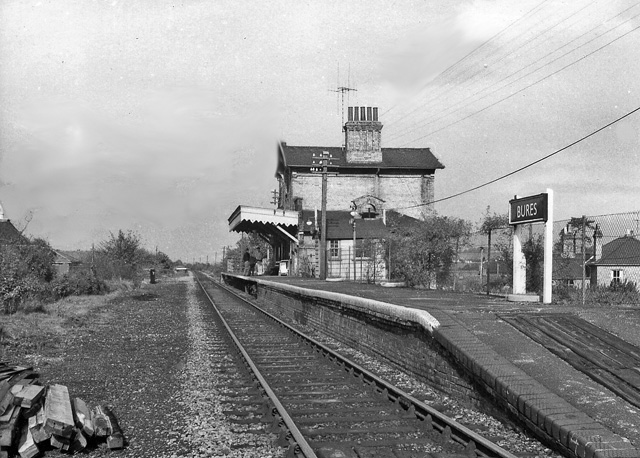
Bures railway station in 1966

Bures railway station is on the Gainsborough Line, a branch off the Great Eastern Main Line to Sudbury, in the East of England, serving the village of Bures, which straddles the counties of Essex and Suffolk.

It is 6 miles 76 chains (11.18 km) down the line from Marks Tey and 53 miles 45 chains (86.20 km) from London Liverpool Street, between Chappel & Wakes Colne to the south and Sudbury to the north. Its three-letter station code is BUE. The platform has an operational length for four-coach trains.

== History ==
The station opened with the opening of the line from Marks Tey to Sudbury as part of the Stour Valley Railway on 2 July 1849.

On 12 July 1887 one person was killed at Bures when part of a runaway train collided with a crossing gate.

The station is managed by Greater Anglia, which also operates all trains serving it, as part of the East Anglia franchise. The original station buildings having been demolished it is now unstaffed and has one platform as the line is single-track. A self-service ticket machine was installed in 2017 as part of a franchise commitment to install ticket machines at all Greater Anglia stations.

In December 2017 Bures was made a request stop during weekday off-peak times and throughout the weekend. However, from May 2019 it reverted to a regular stop with all trains calling.

== Services ==
The typical off-peak service is as follows:

Operator	Route	Rolling stock	Frequency	Notes
Greater Anglia	Sudbury - Bures - Chappel & Wakes Colne - Marks Tey	Class 755	1x per hour	

Preceding station	National Rail	Following station
Chappel & Wakes Colne	Greater Anglia; Gainsborough Line	Sudbury
