= Bures Hamlet =

Civil parish in Essex, England

Coordinates: 51.973°N 0.770°E

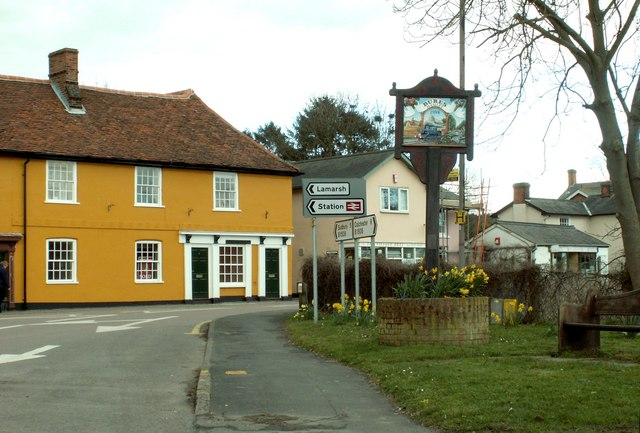

- Location within Essex
- Population: 792 (Parish, 2021)
- Civil parish: Bures Hamlet
- District: Braintree
- Shire county: Essex
- Region: East
- Country: England
- Sovereign state: United Kingdom
- Police: Essex
- Fire: Essex
- Ambulance: East of England

Bures Hamlet is a civil parish in the Braintree district of Essex, England. The civil parish corresponds to the part of the ancient parish of Bures St Mary which lay in Essex; the rest of the parish, including its parish church, was in Suffolk. Since 1866 the old parish has been split into two civil parishes: Bures Hamlet in Essex and Bures St Mary in Suffolk. The village of Bures straddles the two parishes. Bures railway station is in the part of the village in the parish of Bures Hamlet. The parish of Bures Hamlet also includes rural areas, particularly to the west of Bures, including the small hamlet of Daws Cross. At the 2021 census the parish of Bures Hamlet had a population of 792.

== History ==
The Bures Hamlet area historically formed part of the ancient parish of Bures St Mary, also known as Bures. The parish straddled the boundary between Essex and Suffolk. The parish church and the historic core of the village were in the Suffolk part of the parish. From the 17th century onwards, parishes were gradually given various civil functions under the poor laws, in addition to their original ecclesiastical functions. In some cases, the civil functions were exercised by subdivisions of the parish rather than the parish as a whole. In the case of Bures, the parish was split into two parts for administering the poor laws: the part in Suffolk and the part in Essex. In 1866, the legal definition of 'parish' was changed to be the areas used for administering the poor laws, and so the parts in each county became separate civil parishes. The Essex parish was just called "Bures" until 1974, when its name was changed to "Bures Hamlet".

Although classed as a separate civil parish since 1866, Bures Hamlet remains part of the ecclesiastical parish of Bures St Mary. It therefore forms part of the Diocese of St Edmundsbury and Ipswich, unlike the rest of Essex which is in the Diocese of Chelmsford.

== Geography ==
The civil parish of Bures Hamlet rises from the west bank of the River Stour. The most populated part of the parish is the part of Bures village west of the Stour, known as the hamlet. It which flanks the river between the 20m and 25m (65’ and 81’) contour lines.

The rest of the parish of Bures Hamlet is undulating agricultural land with scattered patches of woodland, some being remnants of the ancient forest and later deer parks. Much of the parish lies between the valleys of the River Stour and Cambridge Brook. There are no other major settlements, but a few clusters of cottages by ancient greens and crossroads, and some isolated farms. The highest point in the parish is on the southwest corner of the parish boundary at 73m (237’). There are wide views into the Stour Valley from many parts of the parish.

An extensive network of public rights of way provides off-road access to many parts of the parish. In addition, minor lanes that are relatively traffic-free intersect much of the parish, and while care must be taken in case vehicles are using the often winding and high-banked lanes, these can combine well with paths and bridleways to provide round and linear routes.
