= Chappel & Wakes Colne railway station =

Railway station in Essex, England

Coordinates: 51.926°N 0.759°E

Chappel & Wakes Colne
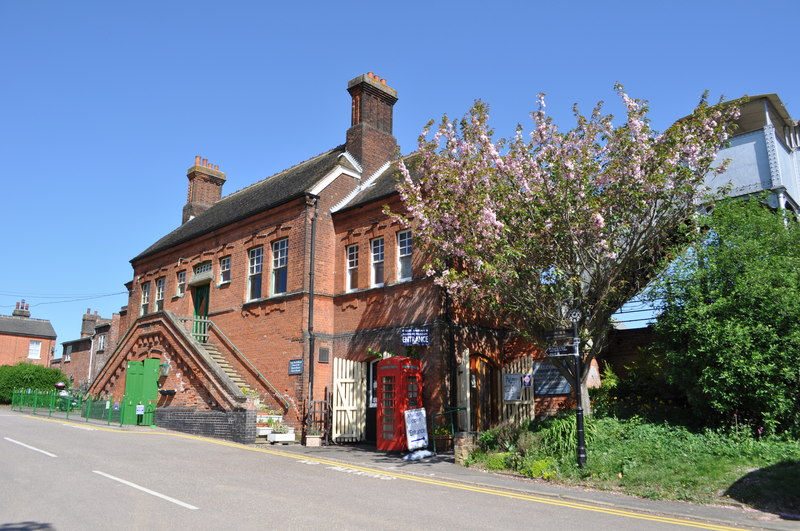
- Chappel & Wakes Colne railway station in 2011

General information
- Location: Wakes Colne, Colchester; England
- Grid reference: TL897288
- Manager: Greater Anglia
- Platforms: 1

Other information
- Station code: CWC
- Classification: DfT category F2

Key dates
- 2 July 1849: Opened as Chappel
- 1 October 1914: Renamed Chappel & Wakes Colne

Passengers
- 2021/22: ▲22,490
- 2022/23: ▲28,176
- 2023/24: ▲28,762
- 2024/25: ▲32,962
- 2025/26: ▲36,216
Location
Notes
- Passenger statistics from the Office of Rail and Road

Chappel & Wakes Colne railway station is on the Gainsborough Line, a branch to Sudbury off the Great Eastern Main Line, in the East of England, serving the village of Wakes Colne and the neighbouring Chappel. It is 3 miles 49 chains (5.81 km) down the line from Marks Tey and 50 miles 18 chains (80.83 km) measured from London Liverpool Street. It is situated between Marks Tey and Bures. Its three-letter station code is CWC. Platform 1 has an operational length for five-coach trains. Platforms 2 and 3 are used by the East Anglian Railway Museum.

The station is currently operated by Greater Anglia, who also operate all trains serving it, as part of the East Anglia franchise. It has one platform as the line is single-track. It is also home to the East Anglian Railway Museum which has the former London-bound platform, a running line, the original station buildings and all of the land and facilities on the east side of the line. Just to the south of the station the line runs over the Chappel viaduct.

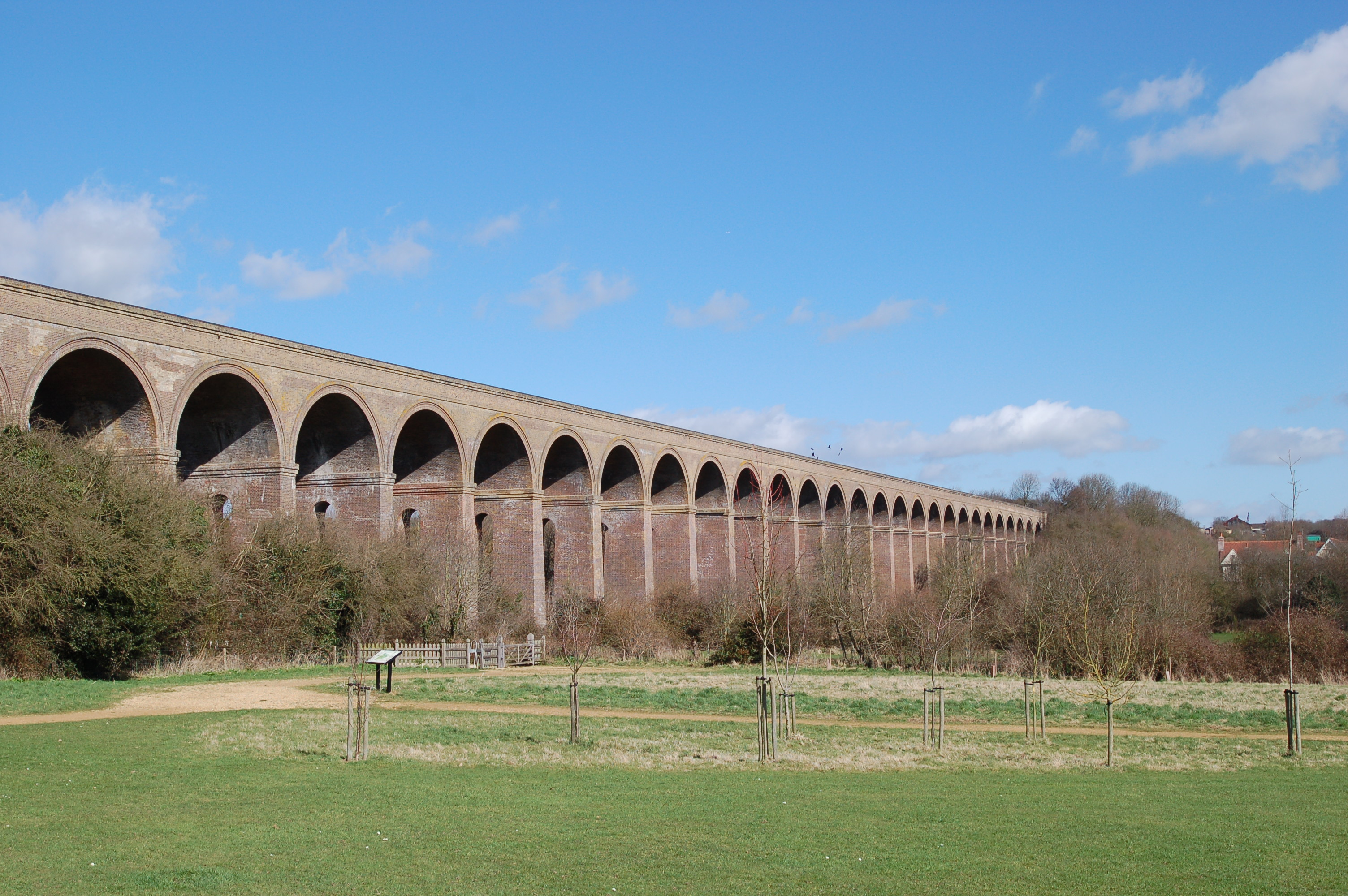
The Chappel viaduct

Chappel & Wakes Colne is unstaffed but has a self-service ticket machine. The platform buildings, on the station's west side, are restored to 1950s style but are part of the museum, and entered from ground-floor level.

== History ==
The station opened with the opening of the line from Marks Tey to Sudbury as part of the Stour Valley Railway on 2 July 1849, with the name Chappel; it was renamed Chappel and Wakes Colne on 1 October 1914.

== Chappel Viaduct ==
Sitting just to the south of the station is the outstanding feature on the line, the 1,066-foot (325 m) long viaduct consisting of 32 arches each having a 30-foot span and standing 75 feet above the valley floor. Built at a cost of £32,000 it contains seven million bricks. The 1851 census records that a foreman bricklayer and several labourers were living in huts adjacent to the viaduct. The vast majority of the bricks had been manufactured on-site using local clay.

== Services ==
The typical off-peak service is one train per hour in each direction, with frequency increased slightly during the peak. The last train of the day continues to Colchester.

Operator	Route	Rolling stock	Frequency
Greater Anglia	Sudbury - Bures - Chappel & Wakes Colne - Marks Tey	Class 755	1x per hour

== In popular culture ==
This station was used as a filming location in two scenes for the 2013 film The Numbers Station, starring John Cusack.

The Britpop band Blur played their first gig in the goods sheds of the station in the summer of 1989.

Preceding station	National Rail	Following station
Marks Tey	Greater Anglia; Gainsborough Line	Bures
	Disused railways	
Terminus	Colne Valley and Halstead Railway	White Colne; Line and station closed
