= Bures, England =

Village in England

Coordinates: 51.9755°N 0.7808°E

Bures
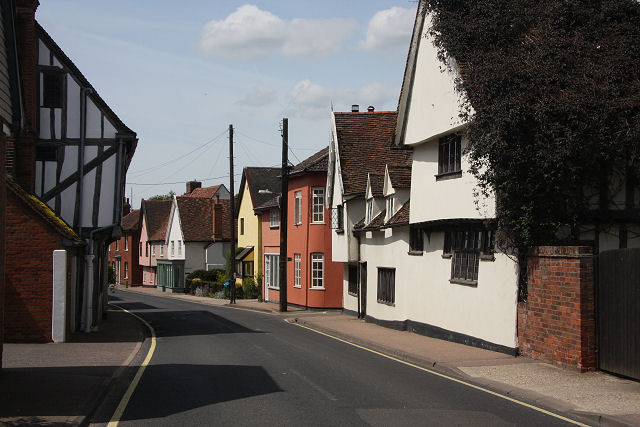
- Genuine 16th-century and later homes in Bures with great overhangs and modest eaves

- Location within Suffolk
- Population: 1,433 Built-up Area (2011)
- OS grid reference: TL910344
- Civil parish: Bures St Mary; Bures Hamlet
- District: Babergh; Braintree
- Shire county: Suffolk; Essex
- Region: East
- Country: England
- Sovereign state: United Kingdom
- Post town: BURES
- Postcode district: CO8
- Dialling code: 01787
- Police: Suffolk
- Fire: Suffolk
- Ambulance: East of England

Bures /ˈbjuːəz/ is a village in eastern England that straddles the Essex/Suffolk border, made up of two civil parishes: Bures Hamlet in Essex and Bures St Mary in Suffolk. In 2011 it had a population of 1433.

== Division ==
The place is bisected by the River Stour, the county boundary from the end of its estuary to near its source. The village is most often referred to collectively, as Bures. On the respective banks are two civil parishes: Bures Hamlet in the Braintree district of Essex, and Bures St Mary in the Babergh district of Suffolk. The village is a post town and its pre-1996 (obsolete) postal county was Suffolk.

== Landmarks and amenities ==
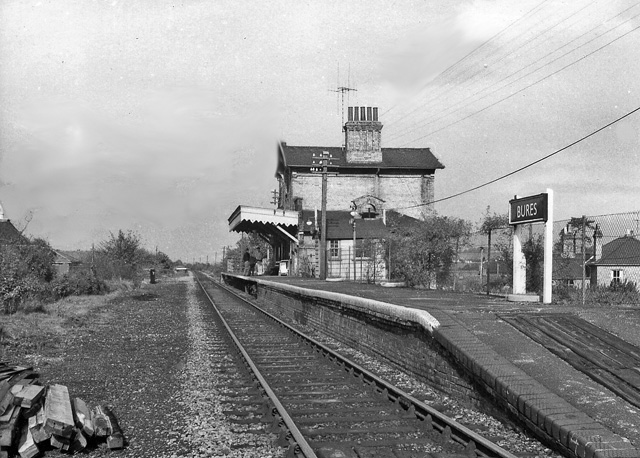
Bures is served by a railway station on the Gainsborough Line, seen here in 1966.

On the left bank is the medieval-core church of St Mary the Virgin housing eight bells with the largest weighing 21 cwt. They were augmented from six to eight bells in 1951 by Gillett and Johnston of Croydon. In terms of the ecclesiastical parish, and thus history before the invention of civil parishes in the 1870s there is no division, save as to county; all falls into Bures St Mary, which extends to a similar distance on each side of the river.

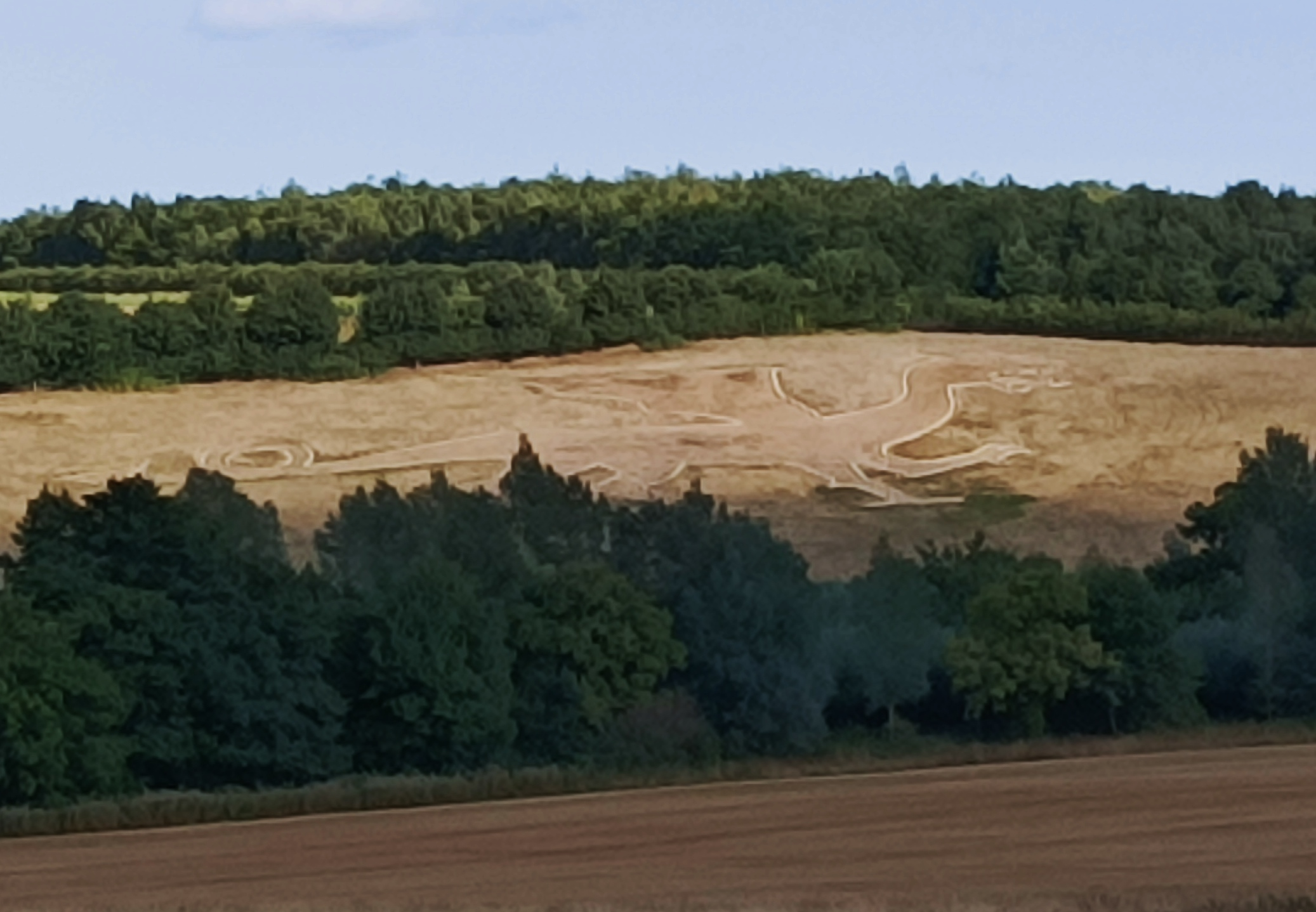
The Bures Dragon as seen from St Stephen's Chapel in August 2022. Browning of the grass surrounding it can be seen, due to the heatwaves in Great Britain at the time.

Approximately 1 mile (1.6 km) east of the village, on the edge of the Dedham Vale (Area of Outstanding Natural Beauty), is a unique geoglyph, a chalk outline of a dragon, which was created as part of the Diamond Jubilee celebrations in 2012. The shape of a dragon relates to a legend from the Middle Ages that tells the story of the knight Sir Richard Waldegrave, whose servants attempted to kill a dragon, but failed due to its tough hide.

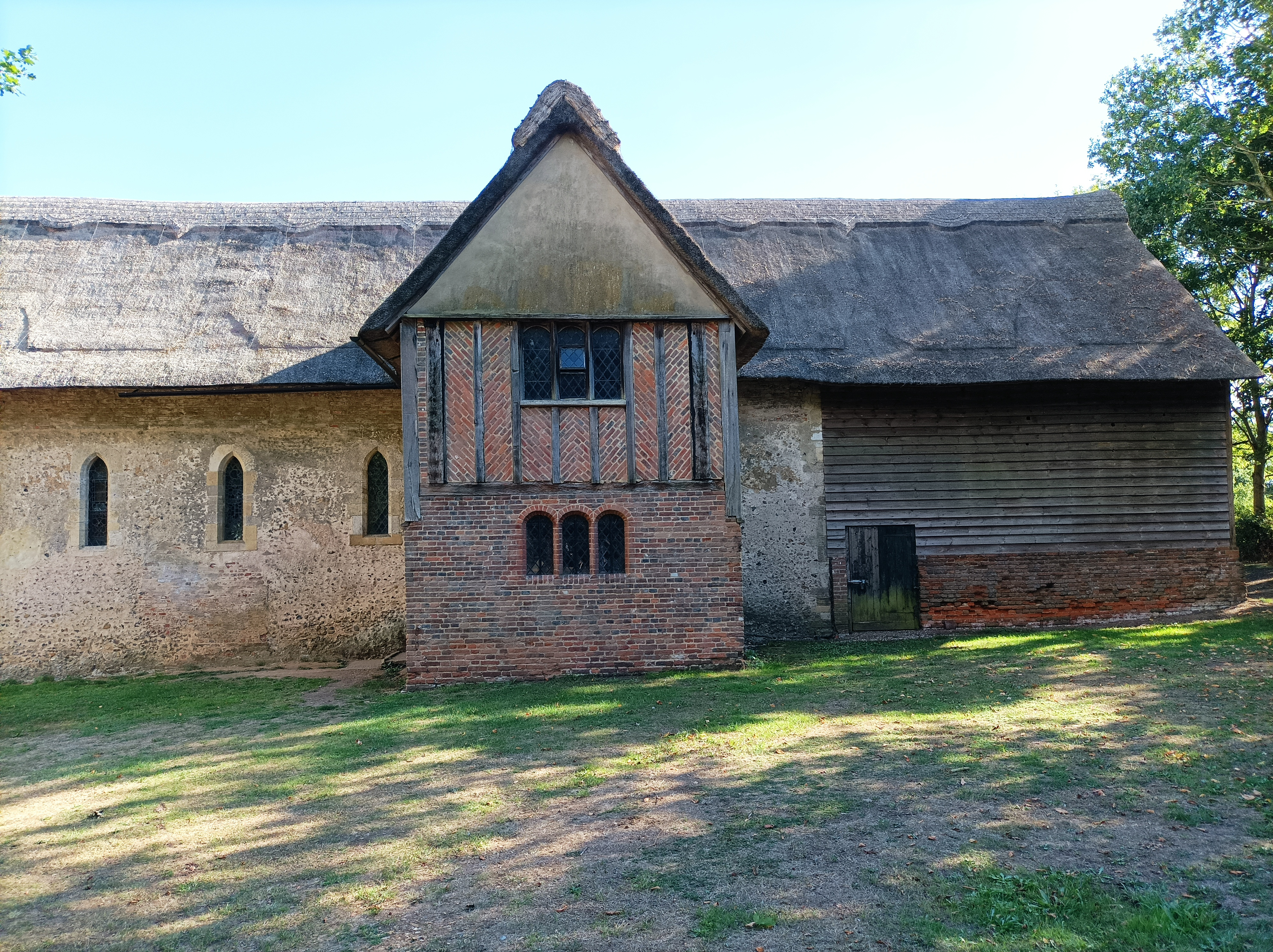
St Stephen's Chapel

A viewpoint of the dragon can be accessed on a public footpath, close to St Stephen's Chapel, the oldest building in the parish. The Archbishop of Canterbury dedicated the site to St Stephen on Saint Stephen's Day in 1218.

The Chapel of St Stephen, which was the private chapel of the Manor of Tany, or Tauney, contains the effigies of the 5th, 8th, and 11th Earls of Oxford from the House of de Vere. This chapel had fallen into disuse after the Reformation, and became, among other things, a barn. Hence its local name of Chapel Barn. It was restored to its present condition in the 1930s by members of the Probert family, and re-consecrated. It has long been popularly held to stand on the traditional site of the coronation of Edmund the Martyr, crowned King of the East Saxons on Christmas Day 855 or 856, as corroboration of which the chronicler Galfridus de Fontibus described the coronation as having taken place at "Bures, which is an ancient royal hill". The De Veres the Earls of Oxford, were the great family of this border region, their star and boar decorating such great churches as those of Dedham, East Bergholt, Castle Hedingham and Lavenham among others, including Earls Colne itself. They inherited Colne Priory at Earls Colne at the Dissolution of the Monasteries, and used the chapel there as their principal burial place until the early 18th century.

The village is served by Bures railway station.

Bures United F.C. is a football team with several sides.

== Notable people ==
The Williams Formula One driver Alex Albon grew up in Bures.
