= Bures St Mary =

Civil parish in Suffolk, England

Coordinates: 51.97177°N 0.77728°E

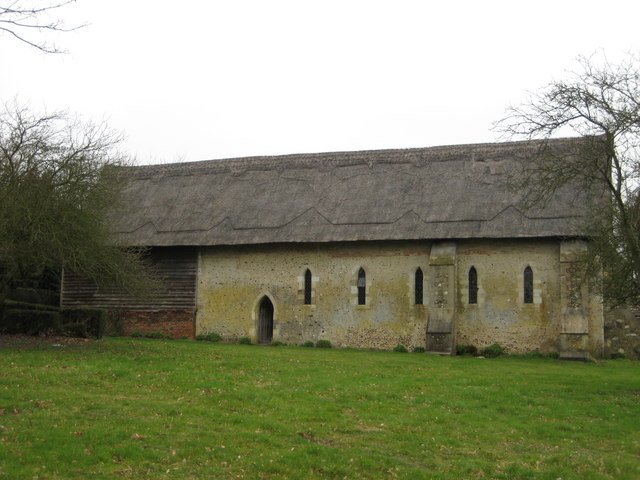
- The chapel of St Stephen from 1218, with its thatched roof

- Location within Suffolk
- Area: 10.44 km^{2} (4.03 sq mi)
- Population: 918 (2011)
  - Density: 88/km^{2} (230/sq mi)
- OS grid reference: TL908340
- District: Babergh
- Shire county: Suffolk
- Region: East
- Country: England
- Sovereign state: United Kingdom
- Post town: BURES
- Postcode district: CO8
- Dialling code: 01787
- Police: Suffolk
- Fire: Suffolk
- Ambulance: East of England
- UK Parliament: South Suffolk

Bures St Mary is a civil parish in the Babergh district of the English county of Suffolk. In 2005 it had a population of 940, reducing to 918 at the 2011 Census. The parish covers the eastern part of the village of Bures, the western part being in the Bures Hamlet parish in Essex divided by the River Stour.

== History ==
The area is rich with cropmarks that include the eastern end of a cursus.

According to the twelfth-century Annals of St Neots, Edmund the Martyr, King of East Anglia, was crowned on Christmas Day 856 "in the royal vill of Burna", which is identified by historians as Bures.

In the Domesday Book of 1086, the village is referred to as "Bura" or "Bure", it's documented having a church with 18 acres (73,000 m^{2}) of free land. The name "Bures" could be derived from either an Old English word "bur", meaning a cottage or bower, or from a Celtic word meaning a "boundary". If the village was not named until after the Norman Conquest, (circa 1066) it could have been called after a French village of the same name, of which there are at least eight: (Bures en Bray, Bures sur Dives, Bures Les Monts, Bures (orne), Bures (Yvelines), Bures Sur Yvette, Bures, Les Bures.

One of the oldest buildings is St Stephen's Chapel which dates back to 1218 when it was dedicated by the Archbishop of Canterbury. It predates St Mary's Church in the village centre, by some 150 years. In 1659 the village was also known as "Bewers" before it gained its modern title of Bures.

Several early émigrés to New England originated from Bures St. Mary and neighbouring Wormingford. Thomas Felbrigge (Philbrick) and his wife Elizabeth Knopp, both of Bures St. Mary, progenitors of the Philbrick family of writers and artists in America including historian Nathaniel Philbrick, arrived in Watertown, Massachusetts in about 1633 and settled in Hampton, New Hampshire. William Knopp of Bures St. Mary (probably a cousin of Elizabeth (Knopp) Philbrick) and wife Judith Tue of Wormingford arrived in Watertown, Massachusetts in 1630.

During the Victorian era, Bures was an industrial village with its own tannery, maltings, brickworks, abattoir, gas works, electricity generator and many other small industries, as well as at least 8 public houses.

Before the coming of the railway in 1849 the transportation of heavy goods manufactured in the village, such as bricks and malt were undertaken by barge (lighter) along the River Stour to Mistley. Following the growth of the railway river traffic fell into decline and stopped in the early 1900s. The rail line in its prime connected Marks Tey to Sudbury and onward to Cambridge and Bury St Edmunds.

The centre of the village has many old historic buildings, with around 75 listed buildings across the parish. Smallbridge Hall, once an Elizabethan manor house, stands at the edge of the village on the bank of the River Stour.

== Governance ==
An electoral ward of the same name exists. This ward stretches north to Newton with a total population of 1,699.

== Geography ==
The population of Bures (2001 census) numbers around 1800, with 659 in Bures Hamlet and 728 in Bures St Mary. Bures can offer two Nature Reserves, Arger Fen a Site of Special Scientific Interest (SSSI) and the adjacent Spouses Vale owned by the Suffolk Wildlife Trust.

The village only currently supports three retailers and a post office.
