= Wakes Colne =

Village in Essex, England

Coordinates: 51.925°N 0.756°E

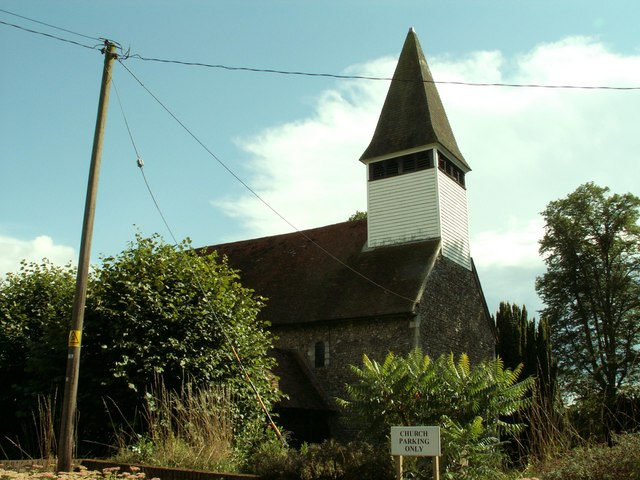
- All Saints church, Wakes Colne

- Location within Essex
- Population: 506 (Parish, 2021)
- Civil parish: Wakes Colne
- District: Colchester
- Shire county: Essex
- Region: East
- Country: England
- Sovereign state: United Kingdom
- Post town: Colchester
- Postcode district: CO6
- Dialling code: 01206; 01787
- Police: Essex
- Fire: Essex
- Ambulance: East of England
- UK Parliament: Harwich and North Essex

Wakes Colne is a village and civil parish in the City of Colchester district of Essex, England. It lies on the River Colne, near the village of Chappel, with which it shares Chappel and Wakes Colne railway station. At the 2021 census the parish had a population of 506.

== Location ==
Wakes Colne is a scattered village on the north side of the river Colne, 8 miles (13 km) west-northwest of Colchester, and 5 miles (8 km) east-southeast of Halstead. It is within the Harwich and North Essex constituency.

== Amenities ==
The village is relatively small but it does however have several amenities: most of which are shared with Chappel. These include:

- A public house (The Swan Inn Chappel)
- A CofE primary school (Chappel Primary)
- Chappel and Wakes Colne railway station
- A small corner shop

== History ==
While it is unclear when the area was first occupied, in 1086 it was recorded as having 25 residents and there is evidence of Roman settlement in the nearby area dating from a much earlier time period. The parish spent most of its history consisting of two main areas, separated by parts of Mount Bures and Chappel parishes, and four smaller detached areas, three in Chappel and one in White Colne which dated from the 16th century or earlier. Because of the divided parishes act (1882) 118 acres were transferred to Wakes Colne from neighbouring parishes and six to the adjacent parish of Chappel.
