= East Anglian Railway Museum =

Railway museum in Essex, England

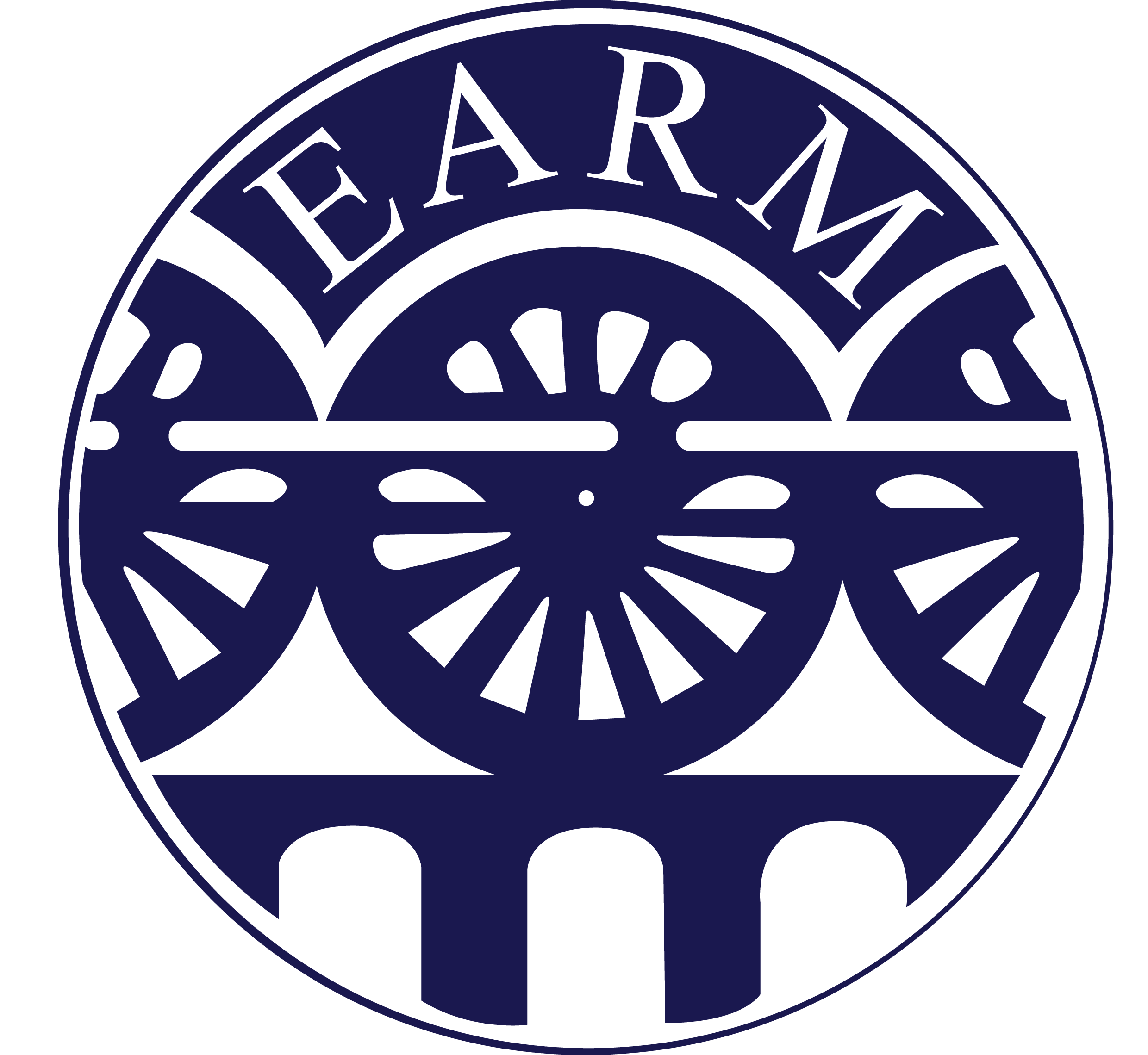

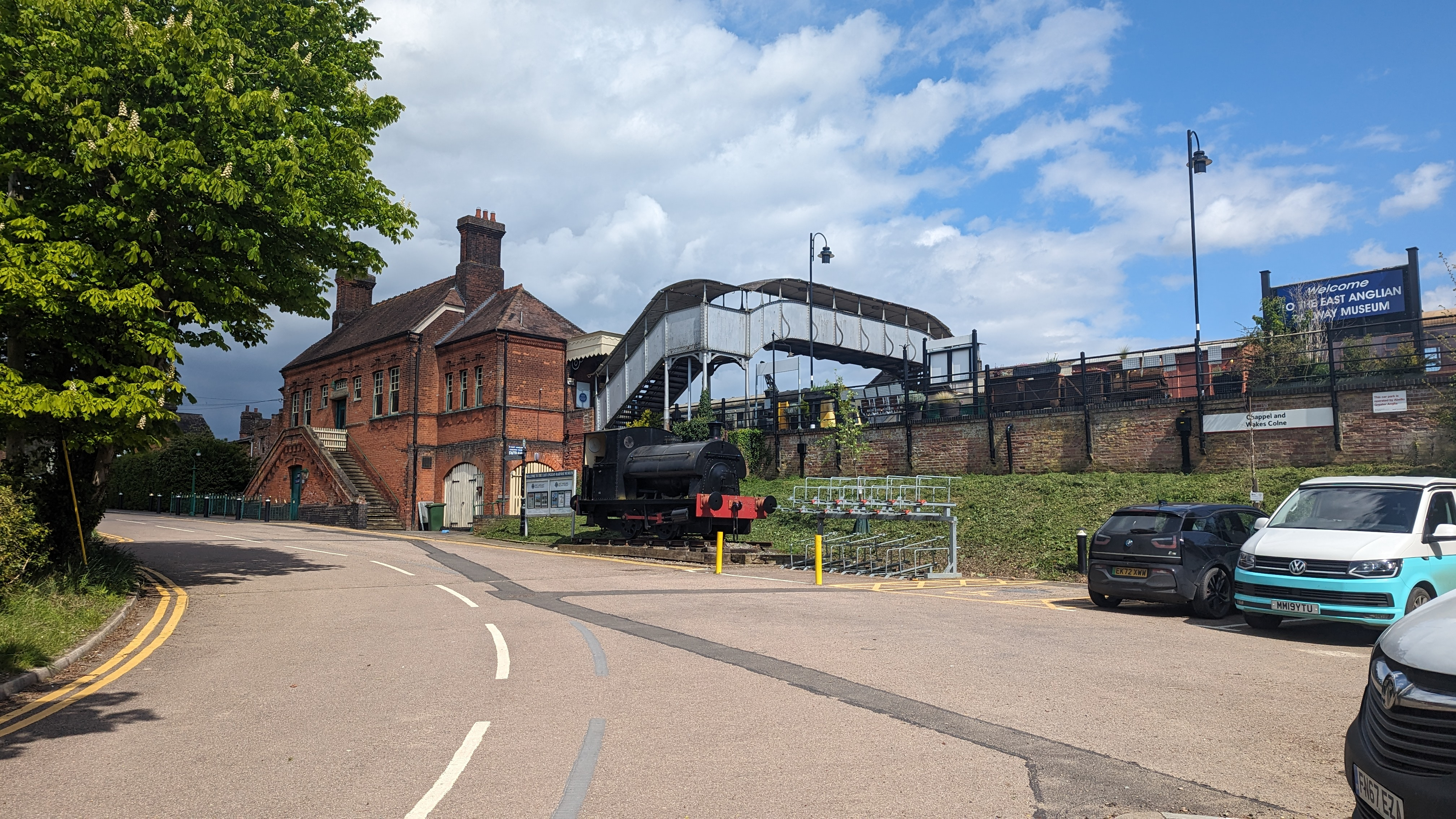
- Entrance to the East Anglian Railway Museum
- Former name: Stour Valley Railway Preservation Society
- Established: 1968
- Location: Chappel and Wakes Colne railway station, Essex, England
- Coordinates: 51°55′33.8″N 0°45′32.6″E
- Type: Railway museum
- Key holdings: LNER class N7 locomotive 69621; GER coach 2155 (the "Boston Coach")
- Collections: Locomotives, coaches, wagons, multiple units and railway infrastructure
- Public transit access: Chappel and Wakes Colne railway station
- Parking: On-site parking
- Website: Official website

The East Anglian Railway Museum is a railway museum at Chappel and Wakes Colne railway station in Essex, England. The station is on the Sudbury Branch Line, the former Great Eastern Railway route between Marks Tey and Sudbury. The museum preserves railway buildings, locomotives, carriages and other railway vehicles associated with the railway history of East Anglia.

The museum operates demonstration trains on a short section of track during some events. The station remains in use by passenger services operated by Greater Anglia, independently of the museum.

The museum was established in 1968 as the Stour Valley Railway Preservation Society and adopted its present name in 1986. It became a registered charity in 1991 and a registered museum in 1995. The English rock band Blur performed its first concert at the site in 1989 and returned for a second concert in 2009.

== History ==
The organisation was established in 1968 as the Stour Valley Railway Preservation Society. Its initial aim was to preserve the recently closed railway between Sudbury and Long Melford, but the project was not completed. The society instead moved to Chappel and Wakes Colne station in 1969, after leasing the goods yard and railway buildings from British Rail. The site included the goods shed, signal box and station buildings. Volunteers restored the buildings and relaid track, and the first public steam event was held soon afterwards.

The society adopted the name East Anglian Railway Museum in 1986, reflecting a broader emphasis on interpreting the region's railway history rather than operating a railway. The museum purchased the Chappel site from the British Railway Property Board in 1987. It became a registered charity (No. 1001579) in 1991 and a registered museum in 1995.

The museum's exhibition hall opened during the museum's Rail 200 event in the summer of 2025.

== Locomotives and rolling stock ==
The museum's collection includes industrial and former British Rail steam locomotives, diesel locomotives, multiple units, railbuses, carriages, wagons and railway infrastructure. The collection includes London and North Eastern Railway and British Rail vehicles as well as locomotives built for industrial users. Some vehicles are operational, while others are displayed, conserved or undergoing restoration.

=== Steam locomotives ===
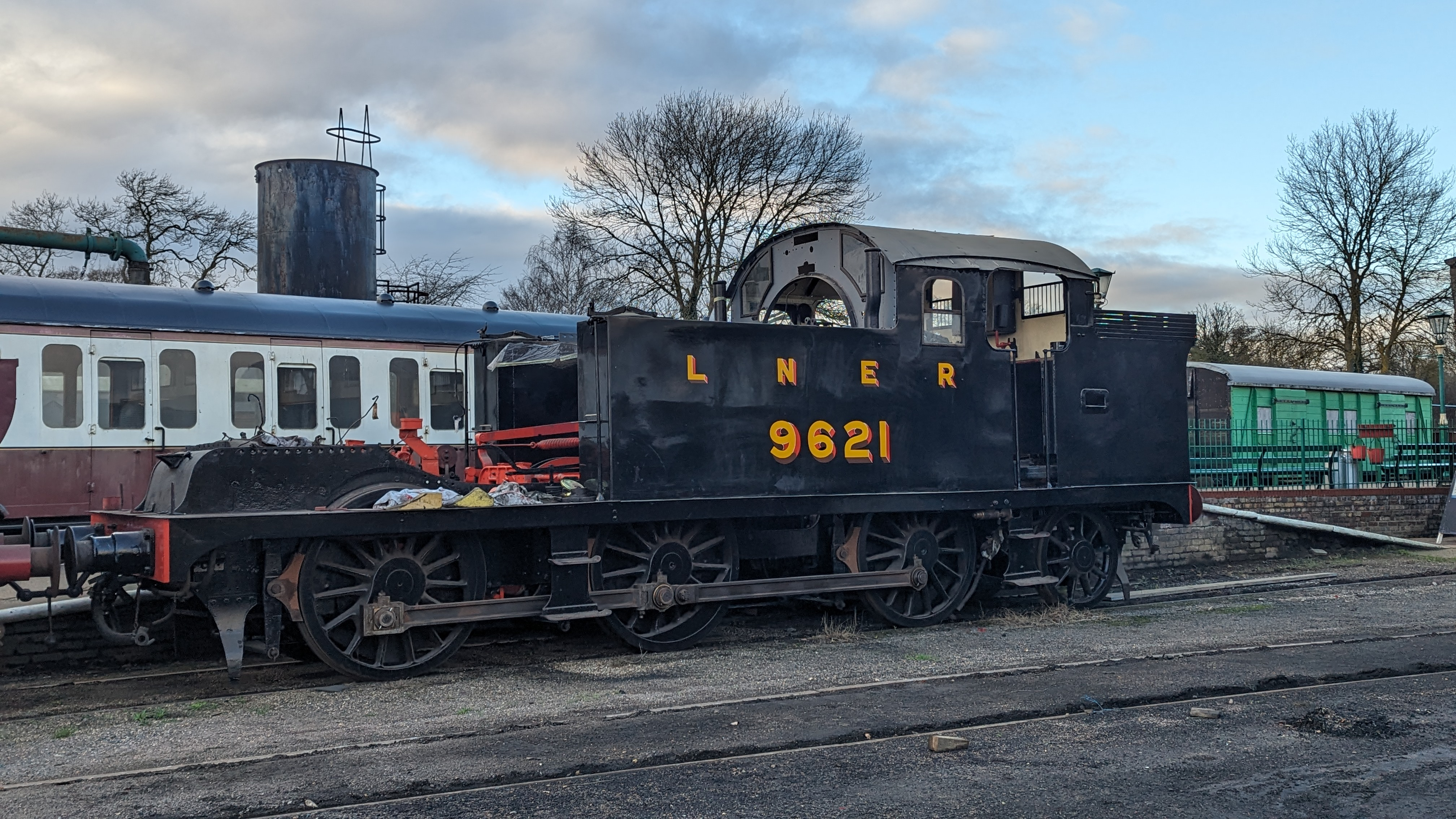
LNER class N7 locomotive 69621 under overhaul

The museum's steam collection includes industrial locomotives and former railway-company locomotives, used on the museum's steam days. Robert Stephenson and Hawthorns 0-6-0ST No. 54 has been cosmetically converted to represent Thomas the Tank Engine for the museum's Thomas & Friends-themed events.

The most prominent locomotive in the collection is LNER class N7 No. 69621. Built at Stratford Works in 1924 as Great Eastern Railway No. 999, it was renumbered several times before becoming 69621 under British Railways. It was withdrawn in 1962, arrived at Chappel in 1973 and returned to steam in 1989. It is currently undergoing a further overhaul.

Selected steam locomotives in the museum's collection
Builder	Wheel arrangement	Number	Name or presentation	Year built	Status
Andrew Barclay	0-4-0ST	11	Storefield	1905	Operational
W. G. Bagnall	0-4-0ST	6	Jubilee	1936	Operational
Robert Stephenson and Hawthorns	0-6-0ST	54	Thomas	1941	Operational
Peckett and Sons	0-4-0ST	—	Jeffrey	1943	Static display
W. G. Bagnall	0-6-0ST	3	Lamport	1942	Under overhaul
LNER class N7	0-6-2T	69621	A. J. Hill	1924	Under overhaul

=== Diesel locomotives and multiple units ===
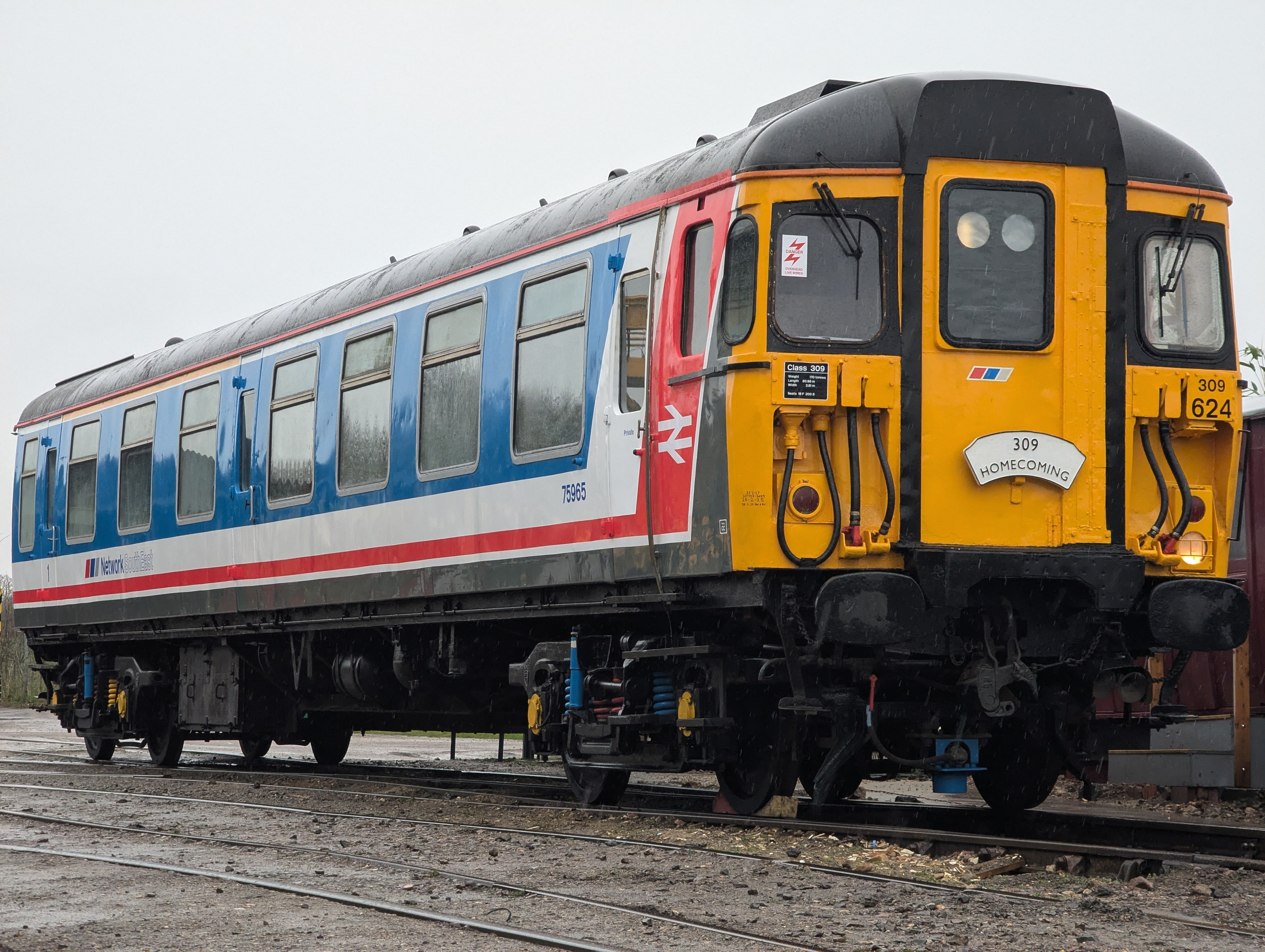
Preserved Class 309 vehicle

The diesel collection includes a British Rail Class 04 shunter, industrial locomotives and a Waggon und Maschinenbau railbus. The museum also preserves vehicles from British Rail Class 101, Class 309 and Class 317 multiple units. The Class 101 is associated with the local route: one of the museum's diesel operating days uses a Class 101 that formerly worked the Marks Tey–Sudbury service. The Waggon und Maschinenbau railbus is used on some operating days.

The museum's Class 309 vehicles arrived in 2024, when the Clacton Express Preservation Group, which had preserved the pair since their withdrawal, donated them to the museum for long-term display. One vehicle received cosmetic work in 2025, while work on the other included weatherproofing repairs.

Selected diesel locomotives and multiple-unit vehicles
Class or builder	Vehicle	Number	Year built	Status
Drewry	0-4-0 locomotive	WD72229	1944	Operational
Andrew Barclay	0-4-0 locomotive	—	—	Operational
British Rail Class 04	0-6-0DM locomotive	D2279	—	Operational
Waggon und Maschinenbau railbus	4w-DM railbus	E79963	1958	Operational
British Rail Class 101	DMBS and DTCL	E51213 and E56358	1958–59	Operational
British Rail Class 309	BDTC and MBS	75965 and 977966	1962	Display and restoration
British Rail Class 317	DTSO	77092	1981	Static display

=== Coaches and wagons ===
The carriage collection includes coaches from the Great Eastern Railway, the London and North Eastern Railway and British Rail. Several historic coach bodies are displayed as part of the museum site, while others form part of the trains used on demonstration days. The museum's exhibition hall includes vehicles ranging from nineteenth-century coaches to a 1980s-built Class 317 vehicle.

Great Eastern Railway coach No. 2155, known as the Boston Coach, is a seven-compartment third-class corridor coach built in 1921. It was later converted for departmental use as a ballast and mess vehicle and was saved by the museum in 1986. The museum is conserving it in its later form rather than reconstructing it as a passenger coach.

The museum also holds four- and six-wheel Great Eastern Railway coaches, including sectioned bodies used to illustrate the construction and interior of historic railway carriages. Its British Rail stock includes Mark 1 coaches used with the museum's demonstration trains, together with freight vans, brake vans, mineral wagons and other departmental vehicles.

Selected coaches and other rolling stock
Type	Number	Year built	Status or use
North London Railway birdcage brake	70	1872	Static display
Great Eastern Railway four-wheel coach	19	1878	Static display
Great Eastern Railway six-wheel coach	247	1888	Grounded body
Great Eastern Railway six-wheel coach	553	1890	Static display
Great Eastern Railway brake third ("Boston Coach")	2155	1921	Under conservation
LNER TTO	23953	1936	Exhibition coach
British Rail Mark 1 SK	E24959	1956	Operational
British Rail Mark 1 BCK	M21027	1954	Operational
British Rail Mark 2 TSO	W5455	1969	Static display
GWR four-wheel Toad brake van	17898	1914	Operational
LMS five-plank wagon	M405032	1936	Demonstration freight vehicle
Plasser & Theurer GPC72 diesel crane	DRP81521	1980	Operational

== Site and operation ==
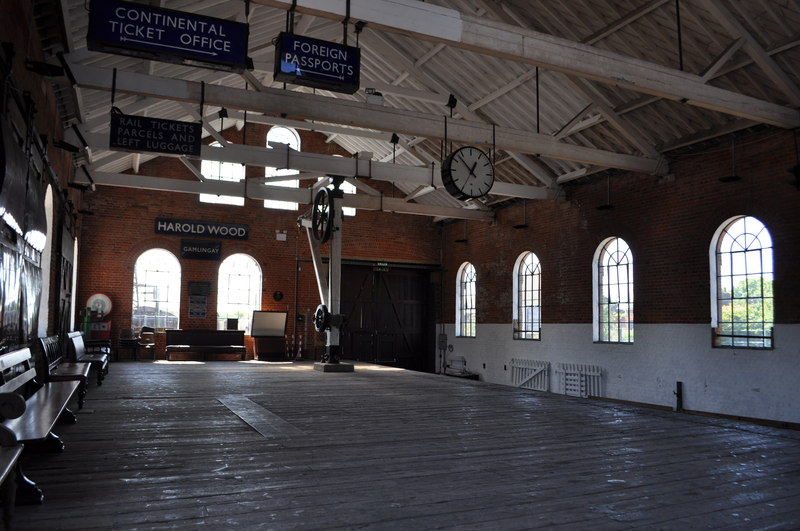
The Victorian goods shed

The museum preserves the station buildings, a signal box and the goods shed. The Restoration Shed is used for volunteer conservation work, and visitors can view restoration projects during selected events. The museum operates a short demonstration line rather than a public railway connecting towns.

The museum formerly operated a miniature railway. Its original line closed in 2019 to make room for the exhibition hall, and a replacement line was subsequently constructed in stages. The new line uses the retained locomotives Frederick and Ricardo Lampwick.

The museum hosts a Winter Beer Festival, held on the last week of February, and a Summer Beer Festival, held each September, on the site.

== Blur concert ==
The English rock band Blur performed its first concert in the goods shed at Chappel and Wakes Colne in 1989. On 13 June 2009, the band returned to the museum for a concert attended by about 150 people. A plaque commemorating the performances was installed at the museum later that year.

== See also ==
- Chappel and Wakes Colne railway station
- Sudbury Branch Line
- Heritage railway
- List of railway museums in the United Kingdom
