= Stour Valley Railway =

Partially closed rail line in England

The Stour Valley Railway is a partially closed railway line that ran between Shelford, near Cambridge, and Marks Tey in Essex, England. The line opened in sections between 1849 and 1865. The route from Shelford to Sudbury closed on 6 March 1967 leaving only the section from Sudbury to Marks Tey, known as the Gainsborough Line, in operation.

== History ==
Colchester, Stour Valley, Sudbury and Halstead Railway Act 1846
- Act of Parliament
- Parliament of the United Kingdom
- Long title: An Act for making a Railway from the Eastern Counties Railway at Marks Tey near Colchester to the Town of Sudbury in the County of Suffolk, and the Town of Halstead in the County of Essex, with a Branch Railway from the Eastern Union Railway to the Hythe at Colchester.
- Citation: 9 & 10 Vict. c. lxxvi

Dates
- Royal assent: 26 June 1846

Colchester, Stour Valley, Sudbury and Halstead Railway Act 1847
- Act of Parliament
- Parliament of the United Kingdom
- Long title: An Act to enable the Colchester, Stour Valley, Sudbury, and Halstead Railway Company to make an Extension of their Railway from Sudbury to Melford, Lavenham, and Clare, in the County of Suffolk.
- Citation: 10 & 11 Vict. c. xi

Dates
- Royal assent: 8 June 1847

Text of statute as originally enacted

Colchester, Stour Valley, Sudbury and Halstead Railway Amendment Act 1855
- Act of Parliament
- Parliament of the United Kingdom
- Long title: All Act to grant further Powers to "The Colchester, Stour Valley, Sudbury, and Halstead Railway Company."
- Citation: 18 & 19 Vict. c. xix

Dates
- Royal assent: 25 May 1855

Text of statute as originally enacted

Colchester, Stour Valley, Sudbury and Halstead Railway Lease Act 1847
- Act of Parliament
- Parliament of the United Kingdom
- Long title: An Act to enable the Colchester, Stour Valley, Sudbury, and Halstead Railway Company to grant a Lease of their Undertaking to the Ipswich and Bury Saint Edmunds Railway Company.
- Citation: 10 & 11 Vict. c. xxi

Dates
- Royal assent: 8 June 1847

Text of statute as originally enacted

Following the Colchester, Stour Valley, Sudbury and Halstead Railway Act 1846 (9 & 10 Vict. c. lxxvi) and the Colchester, Stour Valley, Sudbury and Halstead Railway Act 1847 (10 & 11 Vict. c. xi), the Colchester, Stour Valley, Sudbury and Halstead Railway was authorised to construct a line from Marks Tey to Sudbury and then extend from Sudbury to Clare, with a branch line to Bury St. Edmunds forking off at Long Melford. Before construction was completed, the company had changed hands twice and became part of the Eastern Union Railway by the Colchester, Stour Valley, Sudbury and Halstead Railway Lease Act 1847 (10 & 11 Vict. c. xxi)

The Marks Tey to Sudbury section of the line opened on 2 July 1849 and ran for five years before being taken over by the Eastern Counties Railway on 7 August 1862.

Sudbury and Clare Railway Act 1860
- Act of Parliament
- Parliament of the United Kingdom
- Long title: An Act for making a Railway from Sudbury, through Melford, to Clare.
- Citation: 23 & 24 Vict. c. clxiii

Dates
- Royal assent: 23 July 1860

Text of statute as originally enacted

The Sudbury and Clare Railway Company were authorised by the Sudbury and Clare Railway Act 1860 (23 & 24 Vict. c. clxiii) to extend the line from Sudbury to Clare. This was however superseded the following year by a similar line authorised by the Eastern Counties Railway Act 1861 (24 & 25 Vict. c. ccxxxi).

In 1862 the Eastern Union Railway and the Eastern Counties Railway were amalgamated into the new Great Eastern Railway.

After several years of protracted legal disputes, the Great Eastern Railway opened the section from Haverhill to Shelford on 1 June 1865 and then the section from Sudbury to Haverhill on 9 August. The Long Melford-Bury St Edmunds branch line from Melford to Bury St. Edmunds was also completed in the same year. The line was now connected to the Colne Valley and Halstead Railway at Haverhill, serving Castle Hedingham, Halstead and Chappel and Wakes Colne.

The closure of the line in 1967 under the Beeching Axe was the subject of a protracted battle and a proposal, led by Haverhill Urban District Council, that local authorities subsidise the line.

The remaining operational section of the line is now known as the Gainsborough Line.

== Traffic ==
=== Passenger ===
There were four trains each way on weekdays between Marks Tey and Sudbury in 1850, one of which went to Colchester. When services started between Cambridge and Haverhill, there were three trains each way on weekdays. By the 1890s six passenger trains ran each way on a weekday with the majority going from Cambridge or Bury St Edmunds to Marks Tey or Colchester.

In 1964 conductor guards collected fares on the trains and all stations on the line became unstaffed apart from Haverhill and Sudbury.

Before the line closed (1966–7) there were two trains a day between Sudbury and Cambridge, four between Colchester and Cambridge and six between Marks Tey or Colchester and Sudbury, with a similar number in the reverse direction. The service was operated by primarily by Class 105 and Class 108 Diesel Multiple Units, although some services were locomotive hauled.

=== Freight ===
Coal between Peterborough and Colchester and agricultural traffic were the main freight flows on the line.

== Reopening ==
A study in 2004 looked into the possibility of reopening the route between Cambridge to Haverhill and maybe the entire line. The campaign is now being taken up by Rail Haverhill (formerly the Cambridge to Sudbury Rail Renewal Association).

With thousands of new homes planned to be built in Haverhill in coming years, the need to improve the transport infrastructure between Haverhill and Cambridge has gained greater attention.

On 12 July 2017, Members of Parliament Matt Hancock (West Suffolk, the constituency which includes Haverhill), Heidi Allen (South Cambridgeshire) and Lucy Frazer (South East Cambridgeshire) met with Councillor James Palmer (Mayor of Cambridgeshire and Peterborough Combined Authority), other councillors and further interested parties in the House of Commons to discuss a light railway link from Cambridge to Haverhill. In a Rail Haverhill press release, Matt Hancock MP stressed that "“Haverhill would benefit hugely from a railway" and went on to say "I am pushing to bring a railway back to Haverhill. There is no doubt that better communications will bring an economic boost to the town and an improved quality of life for the residents". A feasibility study was commissioned with a report due by the end of 2017.

This line has been identified by Campaign for a Better Transport as a priority 1 candidate for reopening.
