= Marks Tey railway station =

Railway station in Essex, England

Coordinates: 51°52′50.71″N 0°46′57.92″E

Marks Tey
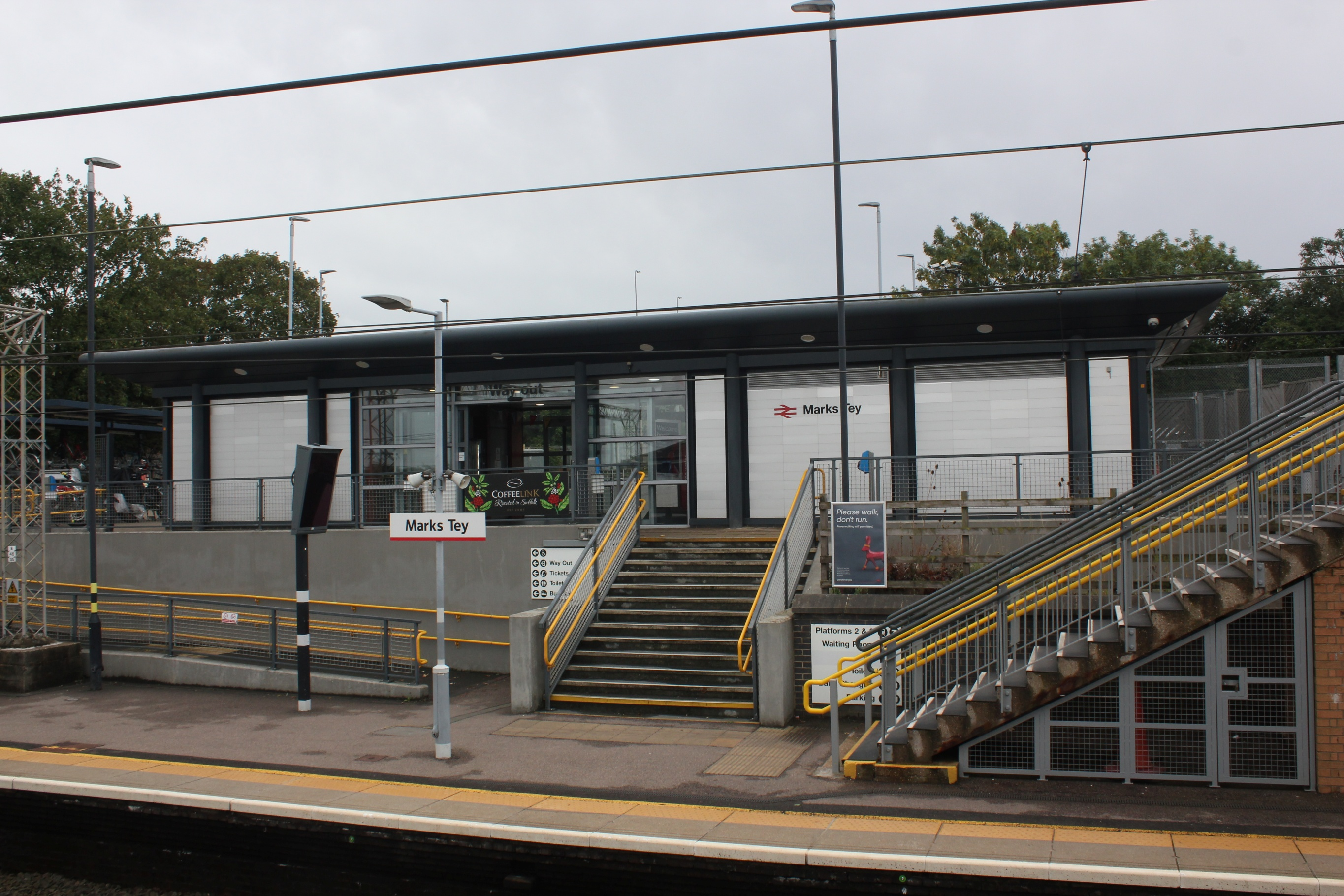
- The main station building in 2025, viewed from the platforms

General information
- Location: Marks Tey, City of Colchester; England
- Grid reference: TL916239
- Manager: Greater Anglia
- Platforms: 3

Other information
- Station code: MKT
- Classification: DfT category D

Key dates
- 1843: Opened as Marks Tey Junction
- 1889: Renamed Marks Tey

Passengers
- 2021/22: ▲0.302 million
- Interchange: ▲0.218 million
- 2022/23: ▲0.402 million
- Interchange: ▲0.275 million
- 2023/24: ▲0.453 million
- Interchange: ▲0.304 million
- 2024/25: ▲0.474 million
- Interchange: ▲0.339 million
- 2025/26: ▲0.504 million
- Interchange: ▲0.362 million
Location
Notes
- Passenger statistics from the Office of Rail and Road

Marks Tey railway station is a stop on the Great Eastern Main Line (GEML) in the East of England, serving the large village of Marks Tey, Essex. It is 46 miles 49 chains (75.02 km) down the line from London Liverpool Street and, on the GEML, is situated between Kelvedon to the west and Colchester to the east. Marks Tey is also the southern terminus of the Gainsborough Line to Sudbury. The station is operated by Greater Anglia, which also operates all trains serving it, as part of the East Anglia franchise.

== History ==
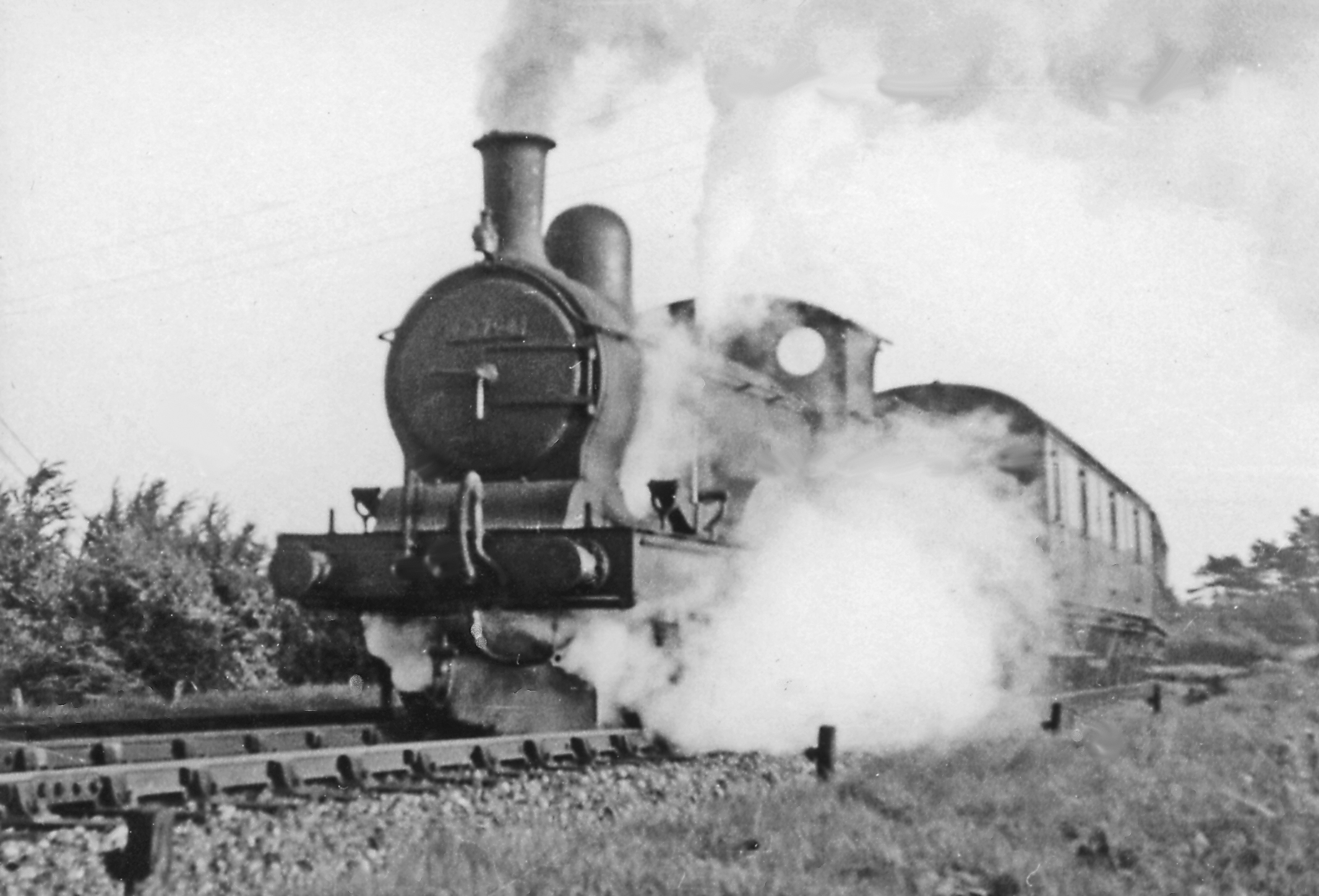
A train bound for Cambridge in 1951

The station opened in 1843 by the Eastern Counties Railway for services on what became the Great Eastern Main Line; the Sudbury branch line followed in 1849. From that date until 1889, the station was known as Marks Tey Junction. The branch line is only accessible to trains travelling from Colchester.

The opening of the Colne Valley and Halstead Railway off the Sudbury branch in 1860, and the extension of the branch beyond Sudbury via the Stour Valley Railway in 1865 to Cambridge, added importance to Marks Tey as a junction, allowing through-trains from Colchester.

These passenger services were gradually cut back and the closure of the Sudbury to Cambridge link in March 1967 saw the end of through running.

An 1897 survey shows sidings on the up side at the Colchester end of the main line platform but the main concentration of sidings including a goods shed and a turntable are on the down side at the Colchester end primarily servicing the branch line.

=== Accidents and incidents ===
- On 29 December 1906, 34 people sustained minor injuries in a collision between two portions of a split passenger train at Marks Tey. As the main portion of the 5:30 pm service from London Liverpool Street to Ipswich came to an unscheduled stop at the station, the rear portion had been erroneously detached from the front section and crashed into the rear of it at low speed.
- On 12 June 2008, a freight train was partially derailed at Marks Tey due to a track defect, causing minor injury to its two crew members. As it passed through the station at 2:05pm, two wheelsets on one of the wagons were derailed, also causing damage to the rolling stock and to infrastructure.

== Facilities ==
It is located on Station Road, just off the A120 road that runs through the village parallel to the railway.

The ticket office is open seven days a week, with ticket machines also available. There is a car park for rail users with 271 spaces; there are also 260 spaces for bicycles.

The up (London-bound) platform 1 has an operational length for nine-coach trains, the down platform 2 can accommodate 11-coach trains and platform 3 (for the Sudbury branch) has an operational length for two-coach trains.

== Services ==
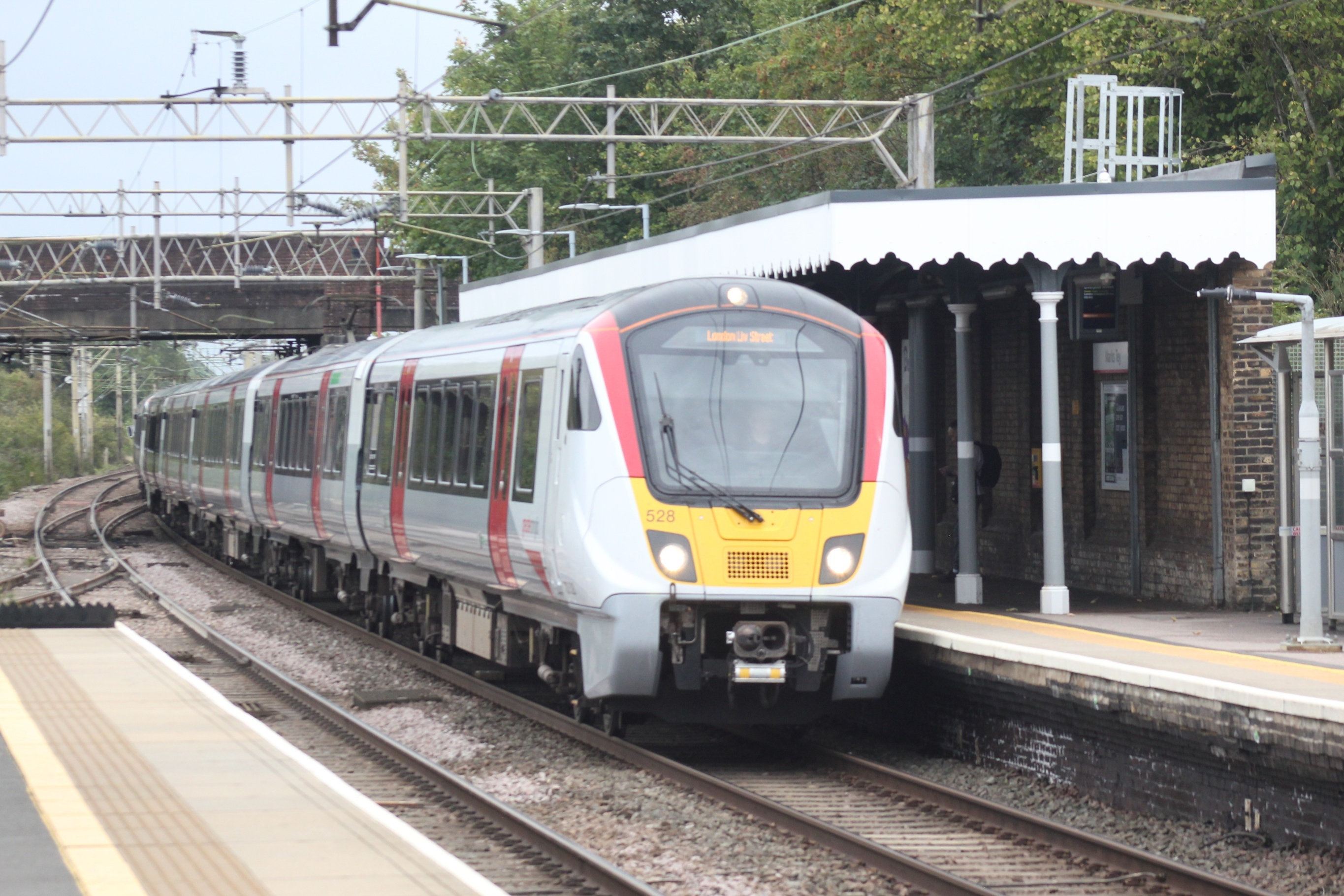
A Class 720 calls with an Ipswich to London train

All services are operated by Greater Anglia. The typical off-peak service along the Great Eastern Main Line is two trains per hour to London Liverpool Street, one to Ipswich and one to Colchester Town. There is an hourly service along the branch line to Sudbury.

During peak times, service frequencies may be increased and calling patterns varied including direct trains to Clacton on Sea.

Preceding station	National Rail	Following station
Kelvedon	Greater Anglia Great Eastern Main Line	Colchester
Terminus	Greater Anglia Gainsborough Line	Chappel & Wakes Colne
