= Sudbury railway station =

Railway station in Sudbury, Suffolk

Sudbury
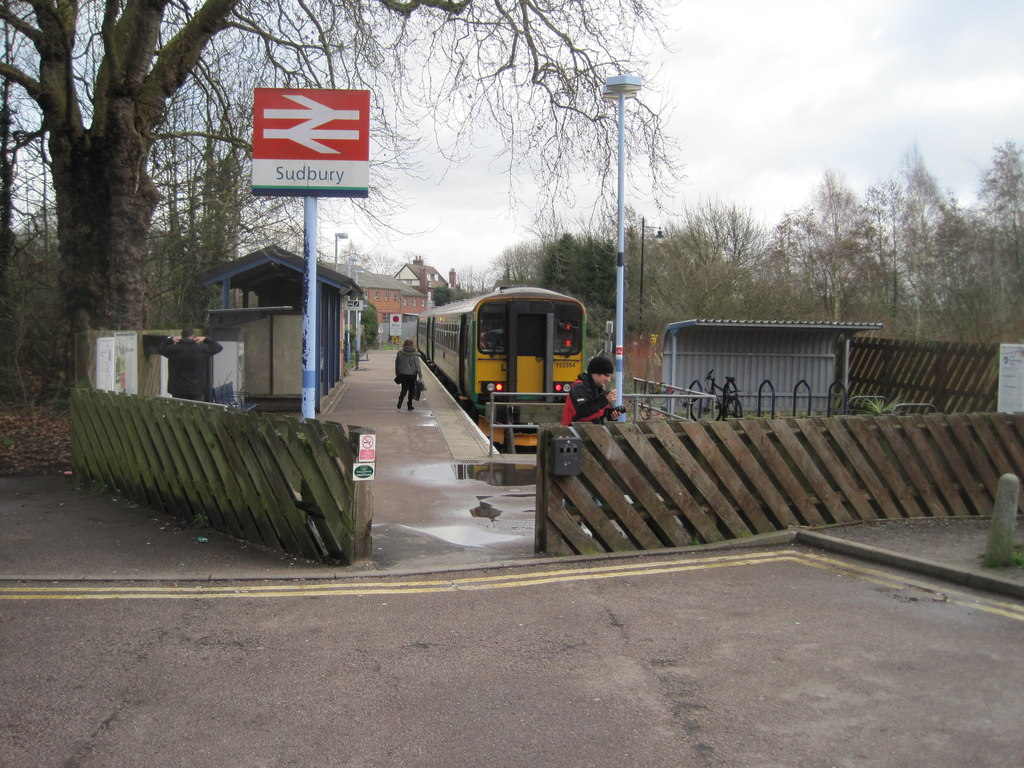
- Entrance to the station, 2011

General information
- Location: Sudbury, Babergh; England
- Coordinates: 52.036°N 0.735°E
- Grid reference: TL876410
- Manager: Greater Anglia
- Platforms: 1

Other information
- Station code: SUY
- Classification: DfT category F1

Passengers
- 2020/21: ▼61,846
- 2021/22: ▲0.224 million
- 2022/23: ▲0.279 million
- 2023/24: ▲0.319 million
- 2024/25: ▲0.348 million
Location
Notes
- Passenger statistics from the Office of Rail and Road

Sudbury railway station is the northern terminus of the Gainsborough Line, a branch off the Great Eastern Main Line in the East of England, serving the town of Sudbury, Suffolk. It is 11 miles 67 chains (19.05 km) down the line from the southern terminus of Marks Tey and 58 miles 32 chains (93.99 km) measured from London Liverpool Street; the preceding station on the branch is Bures. Its three-letter station code is SUY. The platform has an operational length for two-coach trains.

The station is currently operated by Greater Anglia, which also operates all trains serving it, as part of the East Anglia franchise. Sudbury is an unstaffed station with one platform as the line is single-track, and with a self-service ticket machine.

Volunteers from Sudbury In Bloom maintain plants and flowers in the station, which is annually entered into the Anglia In Bloom station competition; it won the Silver Gilt award in 2006, 2007 and 2008. It also won the Best Station Garden at the 2008 ACoRP Community Rail Awards. In 2023, Sudbury station was a joint winner in the most improved station category of the Greater Anglia railway network's Station Adopters' Awards. In 2025 they once again became joint winners of the most improved station award.

== History ==
=== Early history (1849–1862) ===
The first Sudbury station was built by the Colchester, Stour Valley, Sudbury & Halstead Railway, which even before the opening on 2 July 1849, had seen the line leased by the Ipswich and Bury Railway who then themselves merged with the Eastern Union Railway (EUR) in early 1849. The station was a single platformed terminus station at the end of a single-track line from Marks Tey. Trains then shared tracks with the Eastern Counties Railway into Colchester.

It is uncertain when the nearby engine shed was built although given the fact the Stour Valley was a far-flung branch of the EUR, it is likely engines were based here in the single-track brick-built engine shed from opening, as the next nearest facility for the EUR facility was Ipswich engine shed.

The Eastern Union Railway was taken over by the Eastern Counties Railway in 1854.

By the 1860s the railways in East Anglia were in financial trouble and most were leased to the Eastern Counties Railway (ECR). Although they wished to amalgamate formally, they could not obtain government agreement for this until 1862, when the Great Eastern Railway (GER) was formed by the amalgamation.

=== Great Eastern Railway (1862–1922) ===
The original station was replaced in 1865 by the Great Eastern Railway when the line was extended to Cambridge to create the Stour Valley Railway.

In 1866 Sudbury engine shed was part of the Cambridge district and the diaries of the District Locomotive Supervisor referred to Sinclair Y and Z 2-4-0 classes as well as some of the original EUR 2-2-2 locomotives active there.

An 1886 plan of the station area showed two platforms and a back road used for goods trains. The station was approached by a tree lined road whilst the extensive goods yard served a number of maltings and a timber yard as well as the small engine shed. The goods yard incorporated the original station site.

In 1889 extensive signalling and block working was introduced on the line through Sudbury. In addition to the existing signal box located just west of Sudbury station, Sudbury Goods Junction signal box was opened, located east of the station and controlled a level crossing and entrance to the goods yard and engine shed.

On the last day of the GER (31 December 1922) the following locomotives were allocated to Sudbury:

Class (LNER classification)	Wheel Arrangement	Number allocated
E4	2-4-0	1
F4	2-4-2T	1
J15	0-6-0	1

=== London and North Eastern Railway (1923–1947) ===
After the grouping of 1923 operation of the station passed to the London and North Eastern Railway (LNER).

The station signal box was closed in 1934 with the signalling all being controlled by Sudbury Goods Junction signal box.

=== British Railways (1948–1994) ===
After nationalisation on 1 January 1948, Sudbury became part of the Eastern Region of British Railways. The engine shed was demolished in July 1956, although watering and stabling of locomotives still took place until October 1959.

The station was unstaffed from 14 August 1966, when Paytrain operation of the line began, and local goods services were withdrawn on 31 October 1966. Sudbury became a terminus again following the Beeching cuts to railway services, which led to the closure of the through Stour Valley route on 6 March 1967. The track was removed and the station only required a single platform. The footbridge was moved to the East Anglian Railway Museum, where it is in use today.

Despite the fact that all of the track bar a single line into the platform remained, Sudbury Goods Junction signal box was retained to control the level crossing. It was not until 15 February 1981 that the level crossing and signal box were closed.

The station building was unused between 1966 and 1974, and housed the Sudbury Museum until a fire in 1985. In 1982, following the sectorisation of British Rail, the station became part of the London and South East sector, which was renamed Network SouthEast in July 1986.

In 1991, to make way for the construction of the Kingfisher Leisure Centre, the station was re-sited to the edge of the town centre, making it the third station site.

=== Privatisation era (1994–present day) ===
From privatisation the track at Sudbury station was the responsibility of Railtrack.Following the collapse of this organisation in 2002 responsibility fell to Network Rail.

The train services have been operated by the following train operating companies:

- First Great Eastern between 1997 and 2004 when the First Great Eastern franchise became part of the Greater Anglia Franchise.
- National Express East Anglia between 2004 and 2012
- Abellio Greater Anglia from 2012 with the current franchise, renewed in 2016, to be operated until 2025.

== Accidents ==
On 27 January 2006 at least four passengers were slightly injured when a Class 156 train ran into the buffer stop at Sudbury. The 18:05 service from Marks Tey was travelling at a speed at the time of the collision of approximately six miles per hour. An investigation determined that the driver failed to apply the brakes in a "timely and appropriate manner".

== Services ==
The typical off-peak service is one train per hour to Marks Tey, with frequency increased slightly during the weekday peak:

Operator	Route	Rolling stock	Frequency
Greater Anglia	Sudbury - Bures - Chappel & Wakes Colne - Marks Tey	Class 755	1x per hour

=== Historic services – July 1922 ===
July 1922 was during the last summer of Great Eastern Railway operation before the LNER took over I January 1923. The services were detailed on table 290 of Bradshaw's timetable guide for that year. Down services were towards Bury St Edmunds and Cambridge (the line split at the next station Long Melford) and towards Marks Tey in the up direction.

The first weekday departure in the down direction was the 0645 departure to Cambridge and the 0729 departure to Bury St Edmunds. Both trains offered arrivals in those stations around 08.10. The first through train of the day was the 08.44 Colchester - Cambridge calling at Sudbury at 09.39 and departing three minutes later. There was a connecting train for Bury St Edmunds at Long Melford. Similarly the 1105 Colchester - Cambridge train arrived at Sudbury at 11.47 departing two minutes later. The 01.26 (pm) Colchester service to Bury St Edmunds called at Sudbury 0221 departing at 02.30 - the long wait the result of Anup service from Cambridge. The next down services departed Sudbury at 04.22 (to Cambridge) and 0643 (Bury St Edmunds), before the last train of the day which was the 0640 Colchester to Bury St Edmunds calling at Sudbury at 07.30.

In the up direction Bradshaw records the first Sudbury departure as 08.16 towards Colchester (the 0726 through service from Bury St Edmunds) which arrived at Colchester at 08.59. This was followed by three through trains from Cambridge at 10.14, 12.13 (pm) and 02.46. A Wednesday only working from Bury St Edmunds arrived at Sudbury at 05.08 and then the 04.57 service from Cambridge which terminated at Sudbury at 06.22. This connected into the 05.50 Bury St Edmunds which departed Sudbury at 06.37 and was the last up movement towards Colchester. Finally the 07.22 Cambridge terminated at Sudbury at 04.42.

With trains terminating and originating from Sudbury some carriages would have been kept in the station area overnight.

On Sundays three trains operated from Sudbury to Colchester and return (although one started at Marks Tey).

Preceding station	National Rail	Following station
Bures	Greater Anglia; Gainsborough Line	Terminus
	Disused railways	
Bures; Line and station open	Great Eastern Railway; Stour Valley Railway	Long Melford; Line and station closed
