= Saxham and Risby railway station =

Former railway station in England

Coordinates: 52.2575°N 0.6378°E

Saxham & Risby
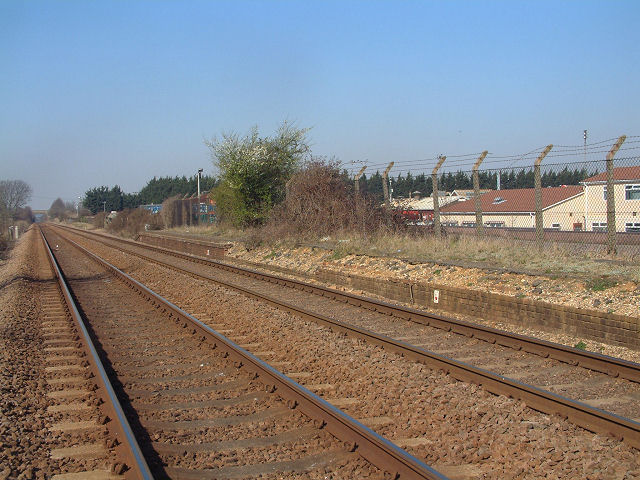

General information
- Location: Risby, West Suffolk; England
- Platforms: 2

Other information
- Status: Disused

History
- Original company: Great Eastern Railway

Key dates
- 1 Apr 1854: Opened as Saxham
- ?: Renamed; Saxham and Risby
- 2 Jan 1967: Closed to passengers
- 28 Dec 1964: Closed to goods
Location

Saxham & Risby railway station was a station serving Risby in the English county of Suffolk. It was opened by the Great Eastern Railway in 1854 following the line's extension from Newmarket to Bury St Edmunds. It was not particularly near either of the places it served, with Risby being about a mile to the north and Saxham a couple of mile to the south. Its main purpose was to serve agriculture in mid-Suffolk.

At its peak during the period 1860 to 1890 there was a station master and three other members of staff. From 1929 onwards the four station staff were replaced by a 'Porter-in-charge' until its closure in 1967. Freight services ceased several years earlier, on 28 December 1964, along with other stations along the line. Saxham and Risby was one of four stations on the line between Ipswich and Cambridge which closed in 1967 following modernisation due to dwindling passenger numbers - the others were Higham, Fulbourn and Six Mile Bottom. After closure, the south platform and waiting room was removed in 1970, whilst the north platform and the main station building remained derelict until it was demolished in the late 1980s.

Today, only a small part of the north platform remains alongside the station car park. A railway terrace house still stands along Station Avenue and has been converted to private residence, however most of the surrounding area has been transformed into an agricultural industrial estate.

According to the Official Handbook of Stations the following classes of traffic were being handled at this station in 1956: G, P, F, L, H, C. and there was no crane. Calor Gas had a private siding there.

Preceding station	Historical railways	Following station
Bury St Edmunds; Line and station open	Great Eastern Railway; Ipswich-Cambridge/Peterborough	Higham; Line open, station closed
