= Abington railway station (England) =

Disused railway station in Abington, Cambridgeshire

Coordinates: 52.128957°N 0.221100°E

Abington

General information
- Location: Abington, South Cambridgeshire; England

Other information
- Status: Disused

History
- Original company: Newmarket Railway

Key dates
- 8 Apr 1848: Opened
- 1 Jul 1850: Closed
- 9 Sep 1850: Re-opened
- 9 Oct 1851: Closed
Location

Abington railway station served Little Abington, Great Abington and Babraham in Cambridgeshire. It closed in 1851, along with its line which was one of the earliest line closures in England.

(The existence of this station is disputed. It is suggested that the name Abington was, if used at all by the railway, an alternative name for the first location of Bourne Bridge station.)

Preceding station	Disused railways	Following station
Balsham Road	Newmarket Railway	Bourne Bridge
