= Kennett railway station =

Railway station in Cambridgeshire, England

Coordinates: 52.2772°N 0.4902°E

Kennett
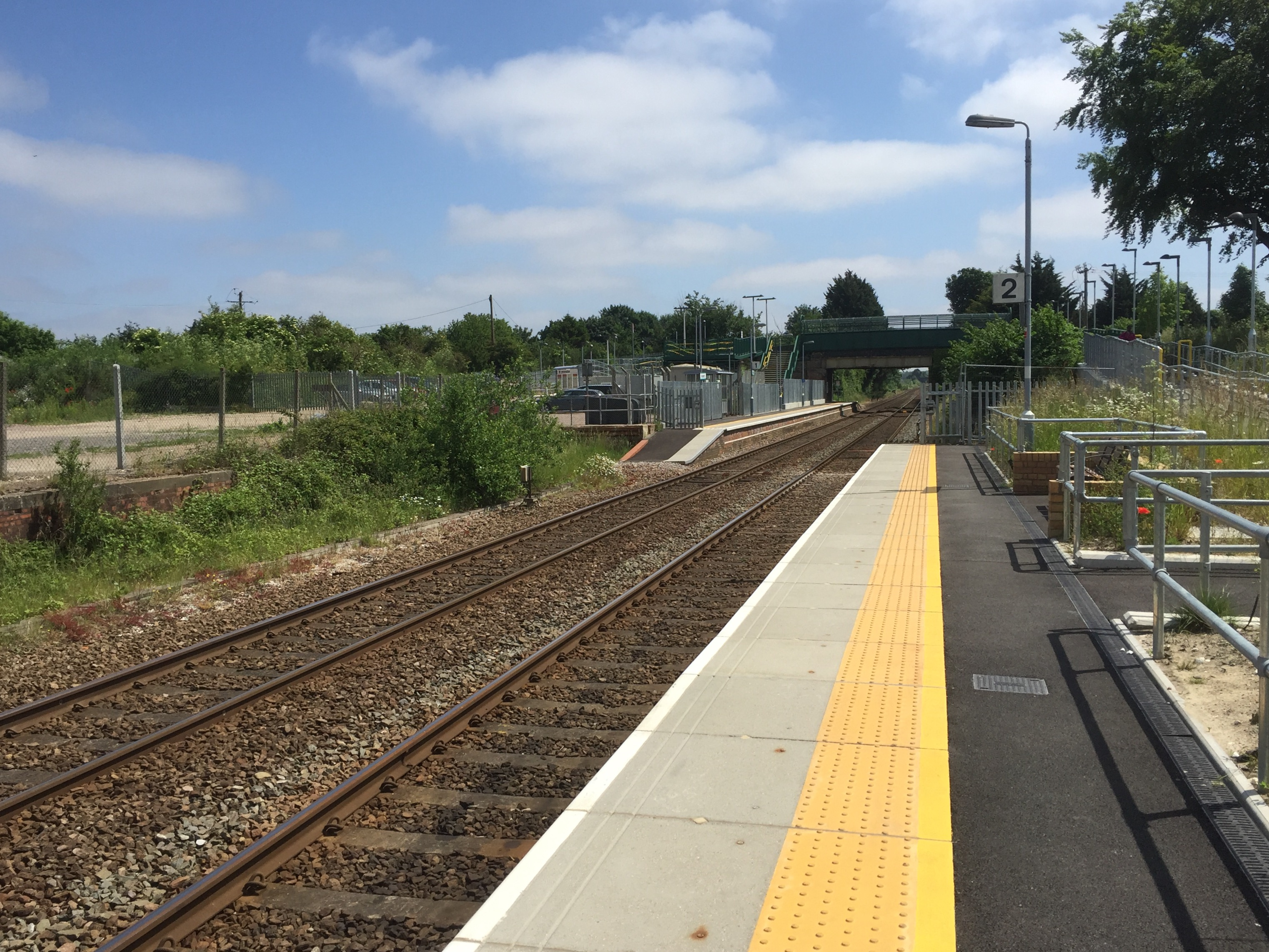
- Kennett railway station in June 2016

General information
- Location: Kentford, East Cambridgeshire; England
- Grid reference: TL699672
- Manager: Greater Anglia
- Platforms: 2

Other information
- Station code: KNE
- Classification: DfT category F2

Key dates
- 1854: Station opens
- 14 April 1965: Closed to goods

Passengers
- 2021/22: ▲36,538
- 2022/23: ▲43,782
- 2023/24: ▲50,226
- 2024/25: ▲53,638
- 2025/26: ▲61,500
Location
Notes
- Passenger statistics from the Office of Rail and Road

Kennett is a railway station serving the villages of Kennett in Cambridgeshire and Kentford in Suffolk, England. It opened in 1854 when the railway was extended from Newmarket to Bury St Edmunds. At its peak during the period 1860 to 1890 there was a station master and three other members of staff. From 1929 onwards the four station staff were replaced by a 'Porter-in-charge' until 1967.

During a heavy storm in 1968, the original brick bridge that crosses the River Kennett east of the station was washed away isolating the line for several days whilst a new metal structure was constructed to replace it.

The station closed to freight traffic on 28 December 1964, although a Speedlink rail service continued to serve the granary behind the station until the mid-1980s. Further east of the station a siding serves Lafarge aggregate, providing sugar stone for British Sugar.

On 2 January 1967, the station became an unstaffed halt on the Cambridge-Ipswich line and the main station buildings were demolished in 1976 after being left derelict. Parts of the original building were retained to serve as storage for the signal box and line-side maintenance; these have since been demolished. The station buildings were typical of the line between Bury St Edmunds and Newmarket, and consisted of a two-story station master's house adjoining a small booking hall, similar to the extant buildings at Higham station.

== Station improvements ==
The signal box closed following the replacement of the semaphore signals on 11 November 2011. It was subsequently removed and transported by road to the Colne Valley Railway in Essex. Signal control was moved to Bury St Edmunds Yard because of modernisation of the line to provide increased capacity. The growth in demand comes from the increase of freight operations from Felixstowe to the midlands.

A new footbridge was constructed in July 2014.

Building work to improve the station continued until the spring of 2016. For the platforms this meant a rebuild of platform 1, resurfacing of both platforms, the addition of sheltered and unsheltered seating, and the installation of LED lamp posts. The carpark was also improved, with the addition of dedicated motorbike and bicycle parking, and an illuminated noticeboard to display train timetables and planned service alterations.

== Historical services ==
According to the Official Handbook of Stations the following classes of traffic were being handled at this station in 1956: G, P, F, L, H, C and there was a 1-ton 10 cwt crane.

== Train services ==
The following services currently call at Kennett:

| Operator | Route | Material | Frequency |
|---|---|---|---|
| Greater Anglia | Cambridge - Dullingham - Newmarket - Kennett - Bury St Edmunds - Thurston - Elmswell - Stowmarket - Needham Market - Ipswich | Class 755 | 1 every 2 hours |

There is also a single daily service to Peterborough (weekdays only), calling at Soham, Ely, Manea, March and Whittlesea.

| Preceding station | National Rail | Following station |
|---|---|---|
| Newmarket | Greater Anglia; Ipswich-Cambridge | Bury St Edmunds |
| Soham | Greater Anglia; Ipswich-Peterborough; Limited service | Bury St Edmunds |
| | Historical railways | |
| Newmarket Warren Hill; Line open, station closed | Great Eastern Railway; Ipswich-Cambridge | Higham; Line open, station closed |
| Fordham; Line open, station closed | Great Eastern Railway; Ipswich-Peterborough | Higham; Line open, station closed |
