= Six Mile Bottom =

Village in Cambridgeshire, England

Coordinates: 52.19°N 0.31°E

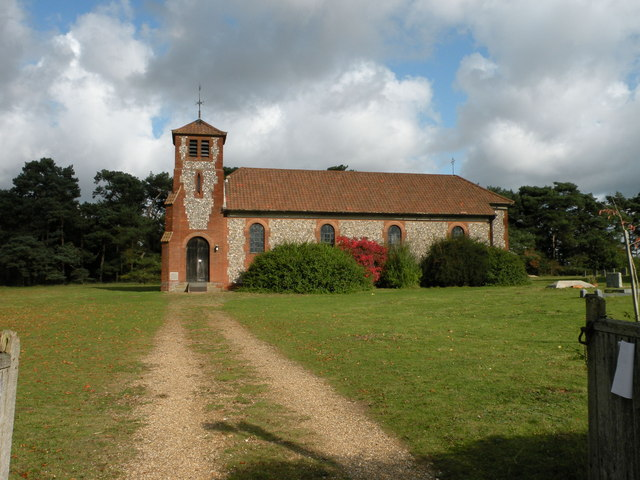
- St George's Church

- Location within Cambridgeshire
- Population: 83 (2006 estimate)
- OS grid reference: TL577569
- District: South Cambridgeshire
- Shire county: Cambridgeshire
- Region: East
- Country: England
- Sovereign state: United Kingdom
- Post town: NEWMARKET
- Postcode district: CB8
- Dialling code: 01638

Six Mile Bottom is a hamlet within the parish of Little Wilbraham, near Cambridge in England.

== Toponymy ==
The hamlet was named in 1801, deriving its name from the six mile distance to Newmarket and its location in a bottom, an archaic term for a valley.

== History ==
In the 1790s the only building at Six Mile Bottom was a paddock run by a stable keeper. In 1802, a sizeable country house was built nearby. Early residents were George and Augusta Leigh, the latter being Lord Byron's half-sister. Their residence is now the Country House Hotel, Paddocks House.

In 1807 the hamlet was the scene for a bare-knuckle fight between John Gully and Bob Gregson in which Gregson was defeated by Gully in a fight in 36 rounds lasting an hour and a quarter.

There was little additional building until the 1840s, but it grew from there until there were 22 homes housing around 170 people in around 1920, most owned by the Six Mile Bottom estate.

Six Mile Bottom railway station served the village from the 1860s (by the Newmarket and Chesterford Railway) until 1967.

== Village life ==
The hamlet had a pub/restaurant, The Green Man, which also provided accommodation, but this has since been demolished and replaced by housing. It had served since the hamlet grew in the early 19th century, but may also be the same inn with stabling for 22 horses that was reported in 1686. It has a social club, on the Brinkley Road. In the 1970s it was owned by ex-Flying Squad detective, Alec Eist, who had been dismissed for corruption.

There was at one time a small school, reopened as a community centre in 1975. Christian services were held in the village's school from the 1890s to the 1920s. The brick-and-flint mission church of St George was built in 1933.

== Transport ==
The A1304 passes through the hamlet. There is one bus a day in each direction, on the route between Cambridge and Stetchworth; that is the only public transport. There was a railway station, Six Mile Bottom, on the Cambridge to Ipswich line. It is now a private residence.

== Gallery ==
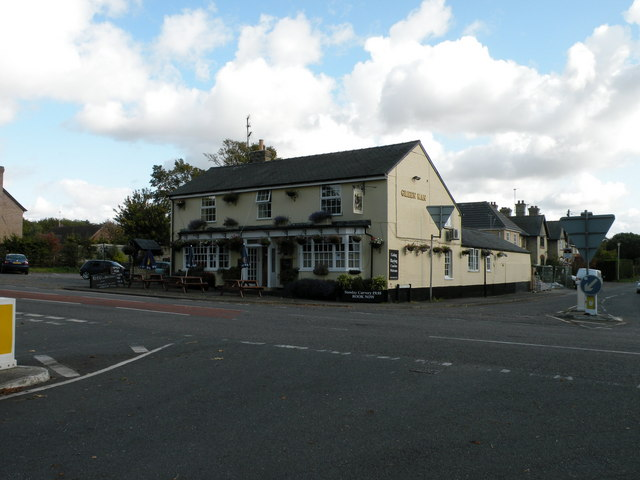
The Green Man public house

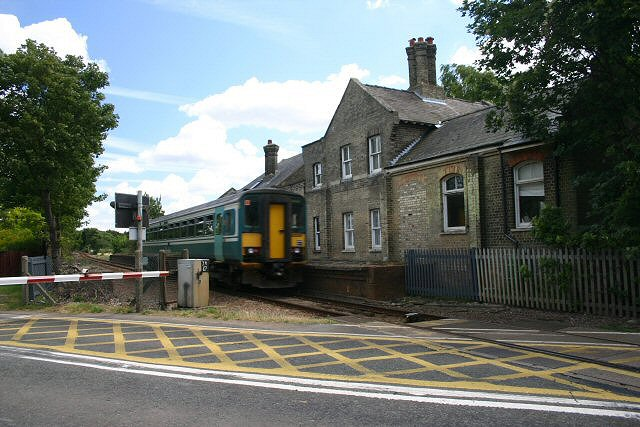
The old railway station
