= Elmswell railway station =

Railway station in Suffolk, England

Coordinates: 52.2381°N 0.9126°E

Elmswell
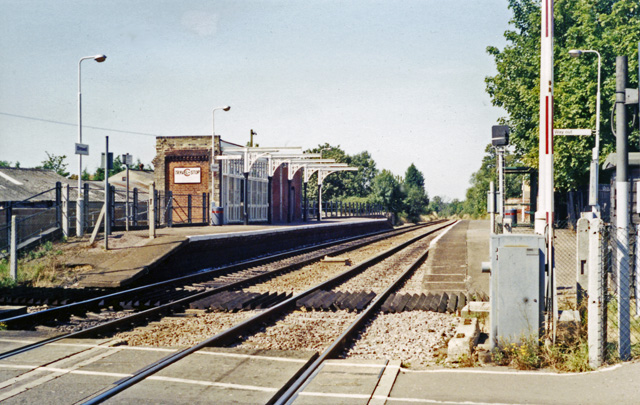
- Elmswell railway station in 1991; Photograph by Ben Brooksbank

General information
- Location: Elmswell, Mid Suffolk; England
- Grid reference: TL989639
- Managed by: Greater Anglia
- Platforms: 2

Other information
- Station code: ESW
- Classification: DfT category F2

Key dates
- 24 December 1846: Station opens
- 12 December 1964: Closes to goods

Passengers
- 2020/21: ▼13,570
- 2021/22: ▲67,164
- 2022/23: ▲91,892
- 2023/24: ▲109,934
- 2024/25: ▲121,748
Location
Notes
- Passenger statistics from the Office of Rail and Road

Elmswell serves the village of Elmswell in Suffolk, England. It is on the Ipswich–Ely line. The station, and all trains serving it, are today operated by Greater Anglia.

== History ==
=== Opening and early years (1846–1862) ===
The Ipswich and Bury Railway Company (I&BR) was formed to build a line from Ipswich to Bury St Edmunds. Its Act of 21 July 1845 authorised capital of £400,000 and it shared many shareholders and directors with the Eastern Union Railway (EUR) who were in the process of building their line from Colchester to Ipswich. The companies also shared the same head office location in Brook Street, Ipswich.

The proposed line was 26.5 miles (42.6 km) long, with intermediate stations at Bramford, Claydon, Needham, Stowmarket, Haughley Road, Elmswell and Thurston.

The ground breaking ceremony took place in Ipswich on 1 August 1845 where twelve local worthies (including the mayor of Ipswich, engineer Peter Bruff and John Chevallier Cobbold) each filled a wheelbarrow with soil. Building the line was challenging with problems at Ipswich with tunnel construction and at Stowmarket where the local marsh swallowed up a lot of material with test probes finding the bog was 80 feet deep!

On 26 November 1846 the first test train ran to a temporary station at Bury St Edmunds with stops at most stations on the route with the inevitable lavish celebrations. The official opening followed on 7 December 1846 when a special train ran from Shoreditch (later Bishopsgate railway station) to Bury. The Board of Trade inspection took place on 15 December 1846 and the line opened for traffic on 24 December.

=== Great Eastern Railway (1862–1922) ===
The GER added a waiting room and some toilets on the up platform.

The Woolpit Brick Company operated on a site 1.25 miles south of Elmswell station. Initially a horse-worked narrow gauge tramway operated running along existing roads, to exchange sidings on the south side of the station. On 6 June 1920 a standard gauge line opened slightly to the east of the narrow gauge line on a purpose built alignment to the edge of Elmswell and thence via some street running to the station goods yard. The lease for this line was only 14 years and this duly terminated in 1915 after which the stock was auctioned on 23 September 1915 and the line lifted during 1916. The line operated three steam locomotives during its short life including a former Jersey Railways 2-4-0T called "Haro Haro". (photo).

In 1911 a siding to a new bacon factory was opened.

=== London & North Eastern Railway (1923–1947) ===
Following the 1923 grouping, Elmswell became a LNER station. During World War II the station acted as a railhead for RAF Great Ashfield.

=== British Railways (1948–1994) ===
Following nationalisation in 1948 Elmswell became part of British Rail Eastern Region.

According to the Official Handbook of Stations the following classes of traffic were being handled at this station in 1956: G, P, F, H, C and there was a 6-ton crane. Beer & Sons and St Edmundsbury Co-op had private sidings.

Goods traffic was to last another eight years with the goods yard closing on 28 December 1964.

The station became an unstaffed halt in 1967 with the introduction of pay train working. In 1974 the main station building was demolished and since then a bus shelter type arrangement has sufficed for passengers using the station.

Upon sectorisation in 1982 Provincial (renamed Regional Railways in 1989) became responsible for all local passenger services.

=== Privatisation era (1994–present day) ===
In April 1994 Railtrack became responsible for the maintenance of the infrastructure. Railtrack was succeeded by Network Rail in 2002. Passenger services have been operated by the following franchises:

- April 1994 – December 1996 Operated as a non-privatised business unit under the InterCity name
- January 1997 -–March 2004 Anglia Railways - owned by GB Railways but bought out by FirstGroup in 2003
- April 2004 – February 2012 National Express East Anglia
- March 2013 – present Abellio Greater Anglia

The buildings on the up platform were restored in 1989/90.

Following the introduction of regular hourly services, passenger usage increased by more than 100% between 2005 and 2012.

== Description ==
From the beginning the station has had two platforms – the down platform is for trains towards Ipswich whilst the up platform initially served Bury St Edmunds until the line through to Newmarket and Cambridge was opened in 1854 and to Ely in 1880.

There were goods yards either side of the line to the west of the station. A siding served a tramway from Woolpit Brick Works in the down side goods yard.

The station building was designed by Frederick Barnes, an Ipswich-based architect who had worked under Peter Bruff. The main buildings were located on the down side and featured high brick chimneys, Dutch gables and a timber fronted canopy.

A level crossing crosses over the line to the east of the station and a signal box was located adjacent to this on the up side of the line. Some cattle pens existed on a siding to the east of the level crossing.

== Train services ==
The following services currently call at Elmswell:

Operator	Route	Rolling Stock	Frequency
Greater Anglia	Cambridge - Dullingham - Newmarket - Kennett - Bury St Edmunds - Thurston - Elmswell - Stowmarket - Needham Market - Ipswich	Class 755	1x per hour

Preceding station	National Rail	Following station
Thurston	Greater Anglia Ipswich to Ely Line	Stowmarket
Historical railways
Thurston Line and station open	Great Eastern Railway Eastern Union Railway	Haughley Line open, station closed
