= Cambridge East =

Cambridge East may refer to:

- Cambridge East, a neighbourhood in Cambridge, New Zealand
- Cambridge East railway station, a proposed railway station in Cambridge, England
