= Newmarket railway station (Suffolk) =

Railway station in Suffolk, England

Newmarket
- The platform, looking east

General information
- Location: Newmarket, West Suffolk, England
- Coordinates: 52.2383°N 0.4073°E
- Grid reference: TL 643 627
- Owner: Network Rail
- Manager: Greater Anglia
- Platforms: 1

Other information
- Station code: NMK
- Classification: DfT category F1

History
- Original company: Newmarket Railway
- Pre-grouping: Great Eastern Railway
- Post-grouping: London and North Eastern Railway

Passengers
- 2020/21: ▼77,602
- 2021/22: ▲0.256 million
- 2022/23: ▲0.303 million
- 2023/24: ▲0.347 million
- 2024/25: ▲0.374 million
Location
Notes
- Passenger statistics from the Office of Rail and Road

Newmarket railway station serves the town of Newmarket, in Suffolk, England. It was opened by the Great Eastern Railway on 7 April 1902. It lies on the Cambridge branch of the Ipswich–Ely line and is 800 yards (730 m) south of the site of the original station. Passenger services are operated by Greater Anglia.

== History ==
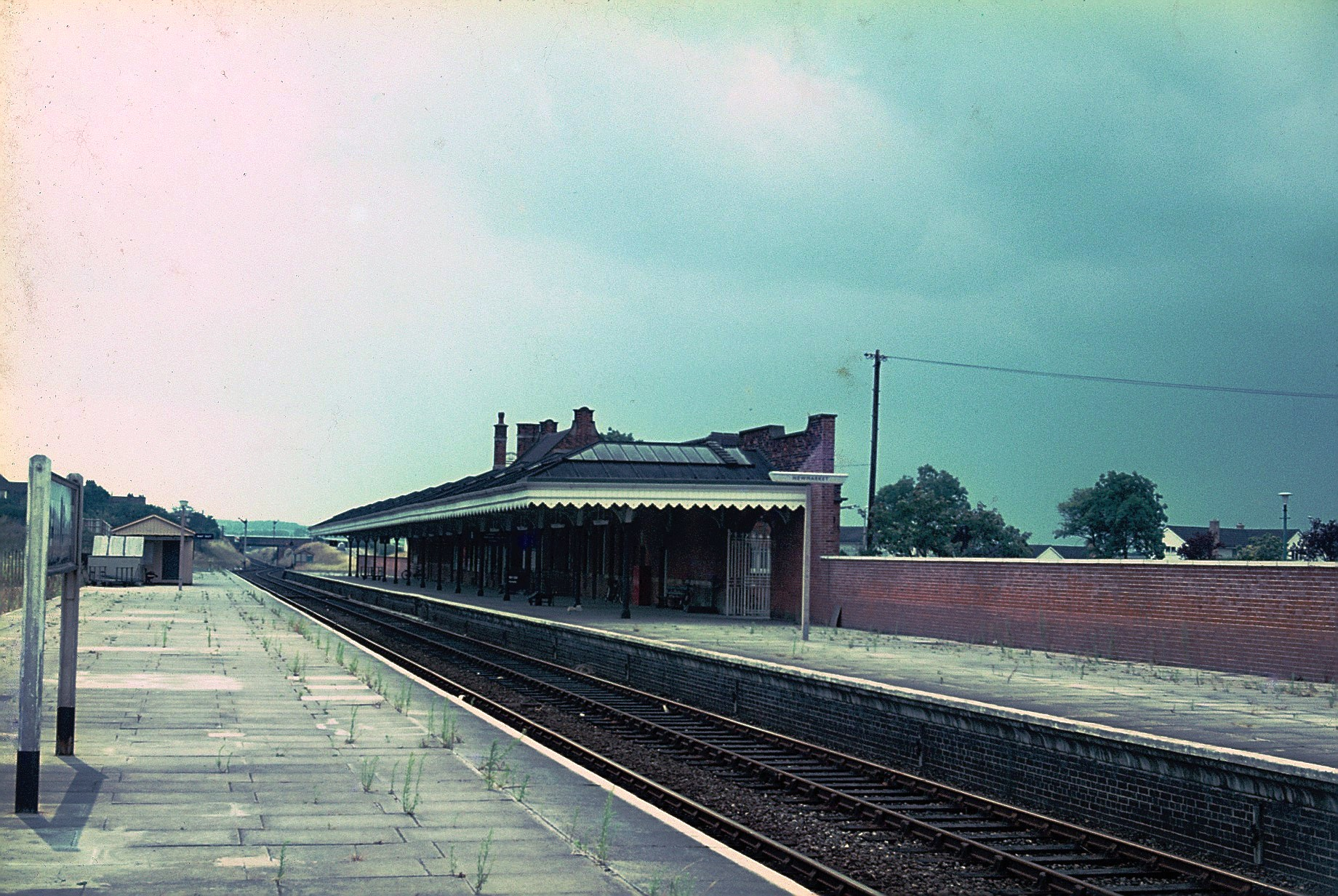
The station in 1970

When built in 1902, the station consisted of two through platforms (Note: Platforms were 760 feet (230 m) long on the down side and 1,170 feet (360 m) long on the up side.) and an east-facing up side bay. The two through platforms, generously provided with canopies, were connected by a subway faced with white-glazed bricks.

There were buildings on both platforms which were of brick construction with white stone reliefs. On the up side, there was a large refreshment room, with floor space of 1,648 square feet (153 m^{2}), a kitchen and a cellar as stores for footwarmers and lamps. Here, separate rooms for porters, ticket collectors and inspectors were supplied, as well as a general waiting room, a waiting room for ladies travelling third class, and more luxurious first class general and ladies waiting rooms. All of these facilities were equipped with lavatories.

A wooden tiled and panelled booking office was located midway along the station buildings. Also located on this platform was the parcels and station master’s (Note: The station master upon its opening was a Mr. Barrett.) office and a telegraph office. The down side buildings were less extensive but contained the full range of waiting rooms, a smaller refreshment room and booking office as well as a bicycle store. The station was built by Rugby firm Parnell and Son, under GER supervision, and was electrically lit throughout.

A signal box was provided at the east end of the up platform and some goods facilities including cattle pens were also located to the east of the station. The signal box was built by contractors McKenzie and Holland.

Following the Railways Act 1921, Newmarket station was operated by the London and North Eastern Railway from 1 January 1923. After nationalisation in 1948, the station was operated by the Eastern Region of British Railways from 1 January 1948. British Railways demolished the buildings on the up platform and a number on the down side in September 1965. The site is now occupied by housing, on Armstrong Close.

Although general goods traffic ceased in 1969, there was a grain terminal, operated by the firm Dower Wood, located north-east of the station that received traffic until summer 1991. The station buildings (Note: The station buildings were located at: 52.2377°N 0.4059°E.) were sold and the current station uses the east end of the down platform.

Further line rationalisation took place in 1978, when tokenless block working was introduced between Newmarket and Dullingham stations on 1 October. Five years later, in May 1983, the line between Dullingham and Coldham Lane Junction was singled leaving a 1-mile (1.6 km) passing loop at Dullingham.

== Facilities ==
The station facilities are now confined to a long broad platform, with basic passenger shelters and seating areas; it has step-free access. There is a car park with 11 spaces and storage for bicycles.

== Services ==
Services are operated by Greater Anglia, a subsidiary of the government-owned DfT Operator; it operates the following pattern:

Operator	Route	Material	Frequency
Greater Anglia	Cambridge - Dullingham - Newmarket - Kennett - Bury St Edmunds - Thurston - Elmswell - Stowmarket - Needham Market - Ipswich	Class 755	1x per hour

Preceding station	National Rail	Following station
Dullingham	Greater Anglia Ipswich to Ely Line	Kennett
