= Dullingham railway station =

Railway station in Cambridgeshire, England

Coordinates: 52.202°N 0.367°E

Dullingham
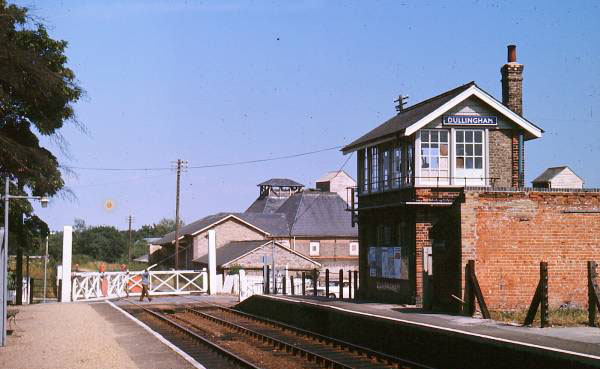
- Signalbox and level crossing gates at Dullingham station

General information
- Location: Dullingham, East Cambridgeshire; England
- Grid reference: TL617585
- Owner: Network Rail
- Manager: Greater Anglia
- Platforms: 2

Other information
- Station code: DUL
- Classification: DfT category F2

History
- Original company: Newmarket and Chesterford Railway
- Pre-grouping: Great Eastern Railway
- Post-grouping: London and North Eastern Railway

Passengers
- 2021/22: ▲22,798
- 2022/23: ▲25,314
- 2023/24: ▲28,974
- 2024/25: ▲32,026
- 2025/26: ▲32,982
Location
Notes
- Passenger statistics from the Office of Rail and Road

Dullingham is a railway station that serves the village of Dullingham in Cambridgeshire, England. It is about 1 mile (1.6 km) north-west of the centre of the village. It is also the nearest railway station to the town of Haverhill in Suffolk, which is about 9 miles away. The station, and all trains serving it, are operated by Greater Anglia. Facilities are a ticket machine, a car park, bicycle storage and a small shelter on the platform by the signal box (on the village side). Originally opened by the Newmarket Railway in 1848 but closed in July 1850 to be reopened in September 1850 when the current route to/from Cambridge was completed the following year and the line east to Chippenham Junction (and thence to Bury St Edmunds and Ipswich) in 1854.

Dullingham is a remote passing loop on the otherwise single track between Cambridge and Chippenham Junction. There is a signal box and manually operated crossing gates. Although at casual inspection the station looks like a standard double-track station the train operation is somewhat different. The main line passes the platform closer to the village (platform 2); all Westbound services use this platform, but the main-line is signalled bi-directionally and unless trains are required to cross at Dullingham Eastbound services typically use this line too. At the time of writing (December 2012) the only regular passenger service to use the distant platform (platform 1) is the train at around 0800 to Ipswich which passes a train to Cambridge at Dullingham. The remote platform (on the loop line) is only signalled to allow Eastbound services to use it. Fast passing services always use the main line if possible - there is a speed restriction on the loop.

The service pattern typically alternates; trains either call at Dullingham or Kennett Monday-Friday with the exception of the 16:44 and the 17:44 services from Cambridge. Sunday services typically call at both.

== Train services ==
The following services currently call at Dullingham:

Operator	Route	Material	Frequency
Greater Anglia	Cambridge - Dullingham - Newmarket - Kennett - Bury St Edmunds - Thurston - Elmswell - Stowmarket - Needham Market - Ipswich	Class 755	Typically 1 stopping service every 2 hours and one service that does not stop on the other hours.

Preceding station	National Rail	Following station
Cambridge	Greater Anglia Ipswich to Ely Line	Newmarket
Historical railways
Six Mile Bottom Line open, station closed	Great Eastern Railway Newmarket and Chesterford Railway	Newmarket Line and station open
