= Bury St Edmunds (disambiguation) =

Bury St Edmunds is a town in Suffolk, England.

Bury St Edmunds or St Edmundsbury may also refer to:

- Borough of St Edmundsbury, a borough centred on the town of Bury St Edmunds, Suffolk, England
- The Diocese of St Edmundsbury and Ipswich, the Lord Bishop of St Edmundsbury and Ipswich and St Edmundsbury Cathedral
- Bury St Edmunds (UK Parliament constituency), a constituency centred on the town of Bury St Edmunds
- Bury St Edmunds railway station, a station serving the town
