= Cherryhinton railway station =

Former railway station in England

Cherryhinton
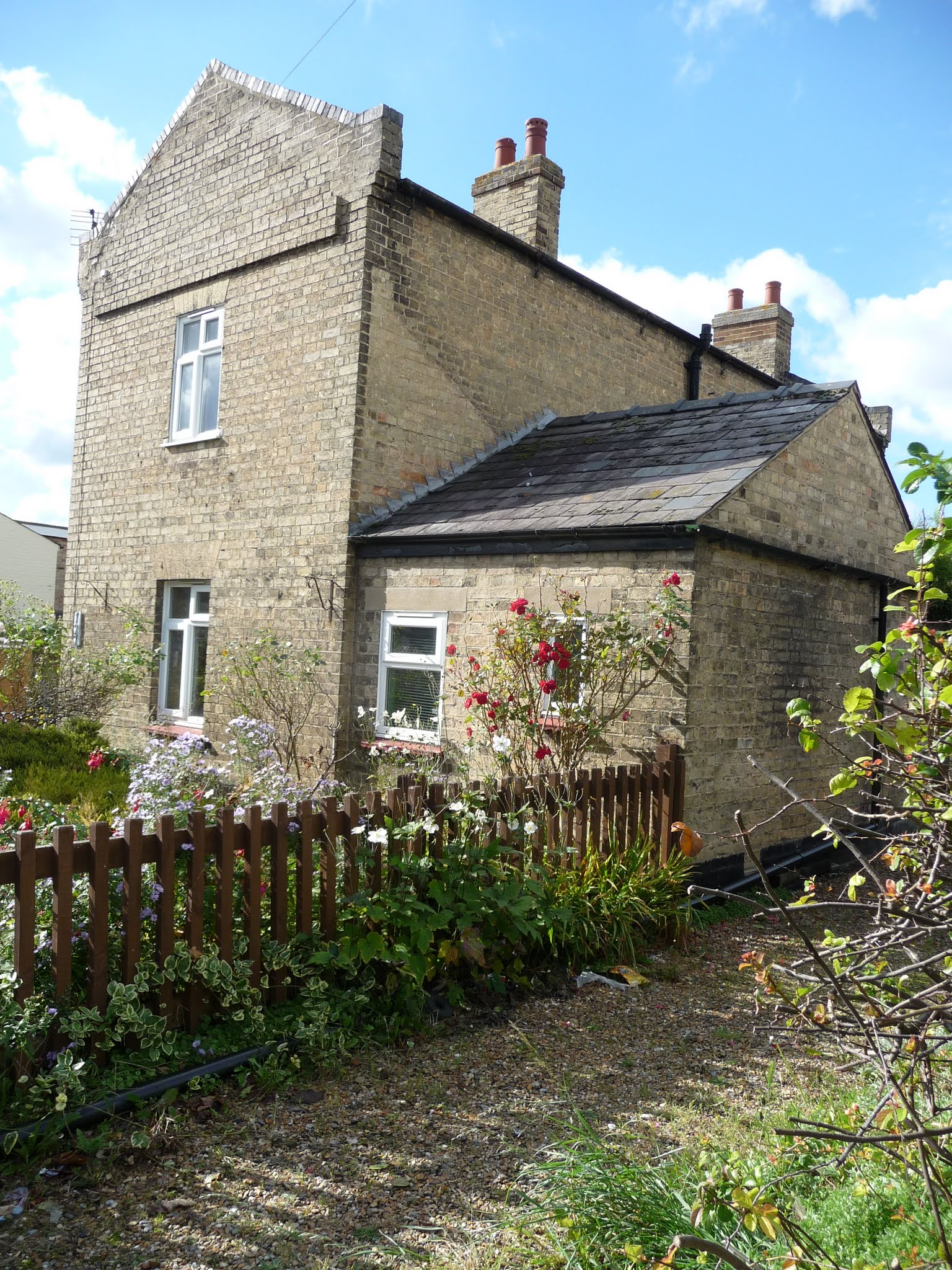
- The original c. 1850 Cherry Hinton station house, October 2012

General information
- Location: Cherry Hinton, City of Cambridge; England
- Coordinates: 52.1899°N 0.1764°E
- Grid reference: TL488568

Other information
- Status: Disused

History
- Original company: Newmarket Railway

Key dates
- 9 October 1851: Opened
- 1 May 1854: Closed
Location

Cherryhinton railway station (spelling) was located on the Newmarket Railway's line between Cambridge and Fulbourn, serving the Cambridgeshire village of Cherry Hinton.

== History ==
The station opened on 9 October 1851, along with the Newmarket Railway's extension from Six Mile Bottom to Cambridge. The Newmarket Railway was absorbed by the Eastern Counties Railway on 30 March 1854, and just over a month later, Cherryhinton station closed on 1 May 1854. The line remains in use.

Reopening of the station was proposed by Cambridgeshire County Council in May 2013 as part of an infrastructure plan to deal with projected population growth up to 2050. A proposal to reopen the station had previously been made in 1996 but 70% of residents who responded to a Council questionnaire were against it; in any event, a new station was not considered viable at that time.

Preceding station	Historical railways	Following station
Cambridge; Line and station open	Newmarket Railway; Cambridge branch	Fulbourn; Line open, station closed

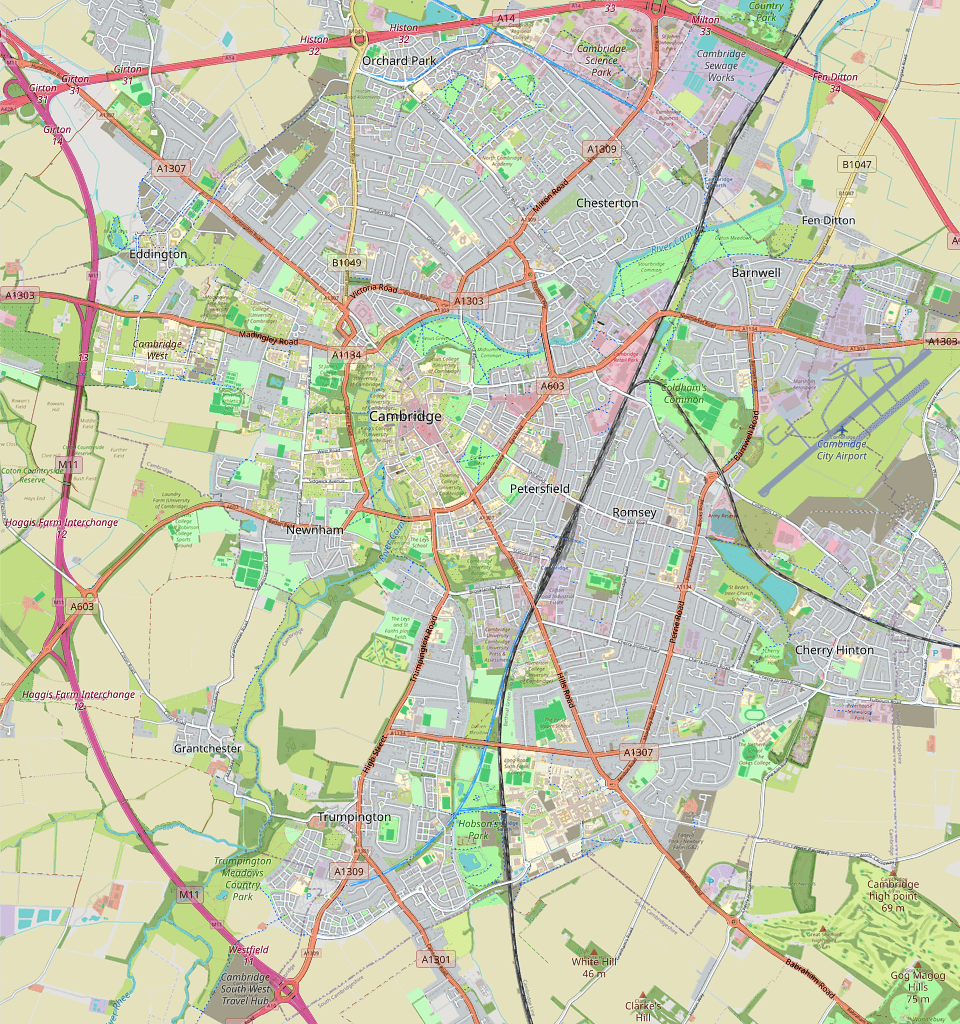
Cambridge railway stations map
(current in bold, closed in italics)

== Station house ==
The original Cherry Hinton station house still stands on the corner of High Street and Railway Street, diagonally opposite the Cherry Hinton C of E Primary School. It serves as a landmark to local residents and its location is represented in the middle of Cherry Hinton village's historic crest, with coordinates made up of the railway line running horizontally across the crest, and the High Street running vertically down the crest.

The property was offered for sale by Grainger plc as a private residence in February 2013.The official name of the station house on its deed is the Gate House, as it formerly served as a level crossing gatehouse to the gate keeper who manually opened and closed the level crossing gates for the railway line.
