= Fulbourn railway station =

Former station in Cambridgeshire, England

Fulbourn
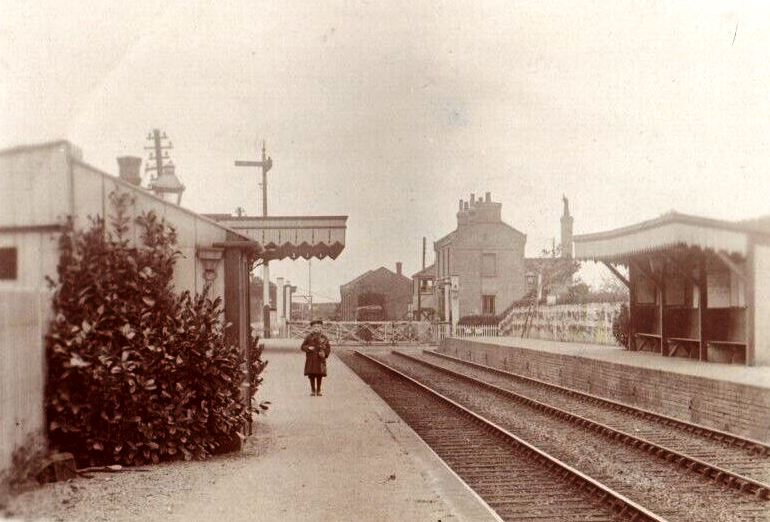

General information
- Location: Fulbourn, South Cambridgeshire; England
- Coordinates: 52.1882°N 0.2286°E
- Platforms: 2

Other information
- Status: Disused

History
- Original company: Newmarket Railway
- Pre-grouping: Great Eastern Railway
- Post-grouping: London and North Eastern Railway

Key dates
- 9 Oct 1851: Opened
- 2 Jan 1967: Closed
Location

Fulbourn railway station (for some time misspelled "Fulbourne" by British Rail) is a disused railway station on the Ipswich to Ely Line, and located between Cambridge and Six Mile Bottom. It served the Cambridgeshire village of Fulbourn, until its closure in January 1967. Although the station is now closed, the line remains in use—with passenger services provided by Abellio Greater Anglia.

Reopening of the station was proposed by Cambridgeshire County Council in May 2013 as part of an infrastructure plan to deal with projected population growth up to 2050.

Preceding station	Historical railways	Following station
Cherryhinton; Line open, station closed	Newmarket Railway	Six Mile Bottom; Line open, station closed
Cambridge; Line and station open	Great Eastern Railway; Ipswich to Ely Line	Six Mile Bottom; Line open, station closed
