= Ely and Newmarket Railway =

Overview
- Locale: Suffolk; Cambridgeshire; East of England
- Dates of operation: 11 August 1875–1 July 1898
- Successor: Great Eastern Railway

Technical
- Track gauge: 4 ft 8 1/2 in (1,435 mm) standard gauge

The Ely and Newmarket Railway was a railway company in England, which connected the city of Ely, Cambridgeshire to the town of Newmarket, Suffolk.

== History ==
=== Unsuccessful schemes ===
A plan by the Newmarket Railway to link Newmarket with Ely had been authorised in June 1847, but the company got into financial difficulties during 1848 (with no work having been carried out on the Ely line), which led to the partial closure of their existing system in June 1850. Two more schemes were proposed for a railway between Ely and Newmarket, but these also failed.

=== Successful scheme ===
Ely and Newmarket Railway Act 1875
- Act of Parliament
- Parliament of the United Kingdom
- Long title: An Act for making Railways from the Great Eastern Railway at Ely to the Great Eastern Railway at Newmarket; and for other purposes.
- Citation: 38 & 39 Vict. c. ccv

Dates
- Royal assent: 11 August 1875

Text of statute as originally enacted

A fourth scheme put forward by the Ely and Newmarket Railway, and supported by the Great Eastern Railway, was successful, being authorised in the Ely and Newmarket Railway Act 1875 (38 & 39 Vict. c. ccv) on 11 August 1875 and opening on 1 September 1879. The line connected into the Newmarket – Cambridge line at Warren Hill Junction. A year later a link was added from Chippenham Junction (west of Kennett station) to a new junction on the ENR route at Snailwell Junction. All lines were single when opened.

The ENR did not possess any locomotives or stock and all trains were operated by the Great Eastern Railway.

=== Take-over by GER ===
On 10 April 1888 the Great Eastern Railway (GER) agreed to lease the line for 999 years, backdated to 1 January 1888. The GER absorbed the line by the Great Eastern Railway (General Powers) Act 1898 (61 & 62 Vict. c. lxvi) dated 1 July 1898.
