= Great Chesterford railway station =

Railway station in Essex, England

Coordinates: 52.060°N 0.194°E

Great Chesterford
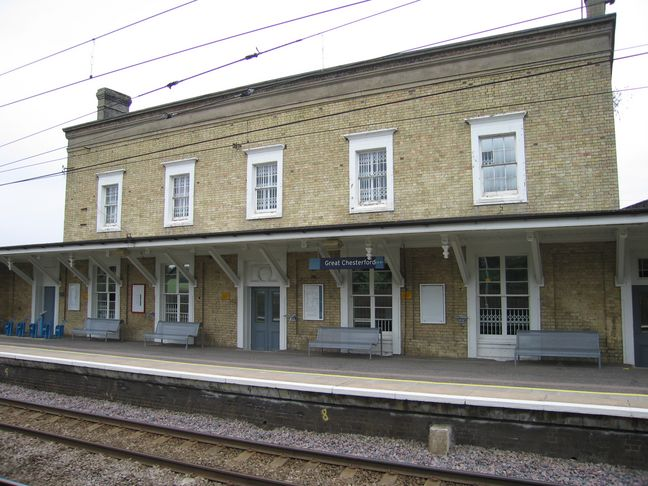
- The station building

General information
- Location: Great Chesterford, District of Uttlesford; England
- Grid reference: TL504424
- Owner: Network Rail
- Manager: Greater Anglia
- Platforms: 2

Other information
- Station code: GRC
- Classification: DfT category E

History
- Original company: Eastern Counties Railway
- Pre-grouping: Great Eastern Railway
- Post-grouping: London and North Eastern Railway

Key dates
- 30 July 1845: Opened as Chesterford
- 1 June 1875: Renamed Great Chesterford

Passengers
- 2020/21: ▼24,252
- 2021/22: ▲77,954
- 2022/23: ▲86,096
- 2023/24: ▲98,778
- 2024/25: ▲100,560
Location
Notes
- Passenger statistics from the Office of Rail and Road

Great Chesterford railway station is on the West Anglia Main Line serving the village of Great Chesterford in Essex, England. It is 45 miles 56 chains (73.5 km) down the line from London Liverpool Street and is situated between Audley End and Whittlesford Parkway stations. Its three-letter station code is GRC.

The station and all trains calling are operated by Greater Anglia.

The station was once the point where the Newmarket Railway left the London to Cambridge main line. This route was authorised in 1846, opened on 3 January 1848 for goods and to passengers three days later. The Newmarket branch was an early victim of poor finance leading to closure: it was temporarily closed on 30 June 1850 and reopened on 9 September 1850, but the section between Great Chesterford and Six Mile Bottom was closed permanently on 9 October 1851 with the opening of the direct line between Six Mile Bottom and Cambridge. The next station to the north of Great Chesterford was Bourne Bridge.

== Services ==
All services at Great Chesterford are operated by Greater Anglia using Class 720 EMUs.

The typical off-peak service in trains per hour is:

- 1 tph to London Liverpool Street
- 1 tph to Cambridge North

During the peak hours, the service is increased to 2 tph in each direction. The station is also served by a small number of peak hour services to and from Ely.

Preceding station	National Rail	Following station
Audley End	Greater Anglia West Anglia Main Line	Whittlesford Parkway
	Disused railways	
Bourne Bridge Line and station closed	Newmarket and Chesterford Railway	Terminus
