= Bourne Bridge railway station =

Disused railway station in England

Coordinates: 52.11857°N 0.216512°E

Bourne Bridge

General information
- Location: Abington, South Cambridgeshire; England

Other information
- Status: Disused

History
- Original company: Newmarket Railway

Key dates
- 8 Apr 1848: Opened
- 1 Jul 1850: Closed
- 9 Sep 1850: Re-opened
- 9 Oct 1851: Closed
Location

Bourne Bridge railway station served Little Abington, Great Abington, Pampisford and Babraham in Cambridgeshire. It was closed in 1851, along with its line, which was one of the earliest line closures in England.

The site of the station was taken over for the construction of the Railway Inn public house. It is believed that the abandoned station was reconstructed around ten years after closure when it reopened as an inn to capitalise on the newly opened Pampisford railway station. What is more, it appears that approximately one-quarter to one-third of the inn comprised the actual brickwork of the station.

Former Services

Preceding station	Disused railways	Following station
Balsham Road	Newmarket Railway	Chesterford
