= Linton railway station (Cambridgeshire) =

Former railway station in England

Coordinates: 52.0955°N 0.2701°E

Linton
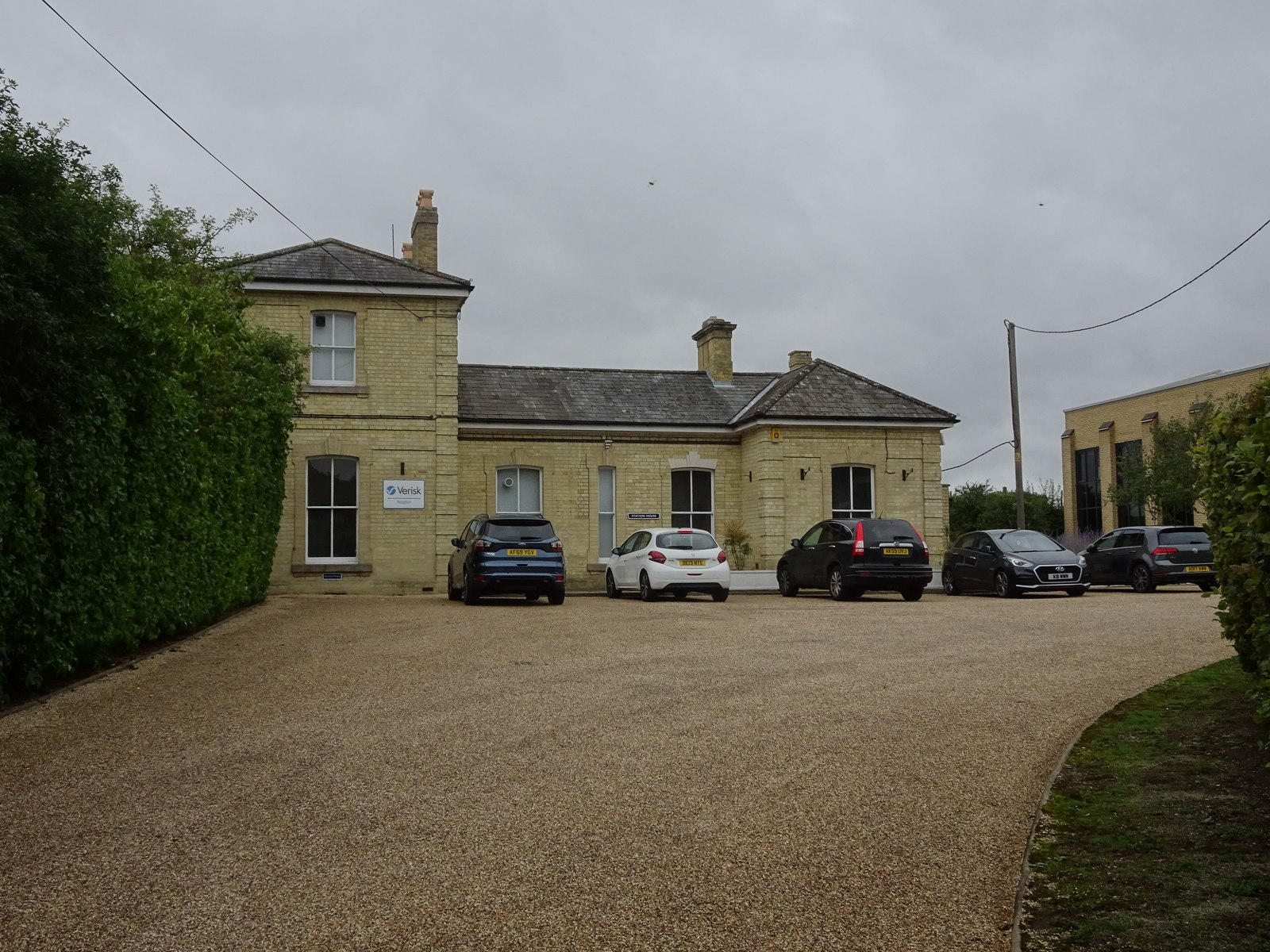
- Station in 2020.

General information
- Location: Linton, South Cambridgeshire; England
- Platforms: 2

Other information
- Status: Disused

History
- Original company: Great Eastern Railway
- Pre-grouping: Great Eastern Railway
- Post-grouping: London and North Eastern Railway

Key dates
- 1 June 1865: Opened
- 6 March 1967: Closed
Location

Linton railway station was a railway station in Linton, Cambridgeshire on the Stour Valley Railway. It closed in 1967. The station house is H-shaped and made of tan colour brick. It is still standing, as well as the platform and sunken trackbed space at the back of the building.

== Future ==
The Cambridge Metro project intended to reopen Linton and Haverhill stations, for a commuter light railway to Cambridge city centre. However, the project was scrapped in 2021 by Nik Johnson

Preceding station	Disused railways	Following station
Pampisford	Great Eastern Railway; Stour Valley Railway	Bartlow
