= Bury St Edmunds railway station =

Grade II listed railway station in Suffolk, England

Coordinates: 52.254°N 0.713°E

Bury St Edmunds
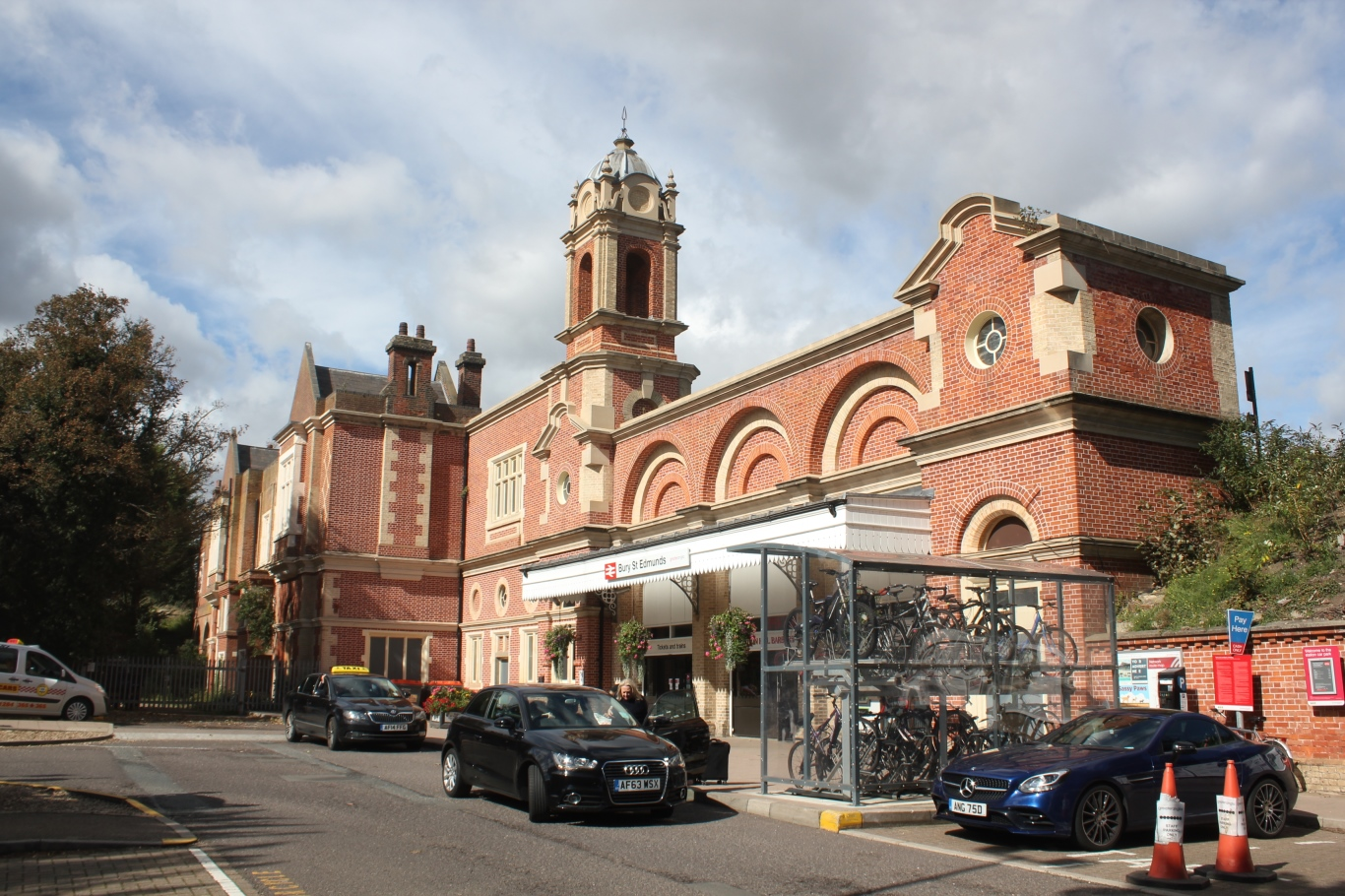

General information
- Location: Bury St Edmunds, West Suffolk; England
- Grid reference: TL852651
- Manager: Greater Anglia
- Platforms: 2

Other information
- Station code: BSE
- Classification: DfT category C2

History
- Opened: 1847 (Note: A temporary station opened on 24 December 1846; the permanent station, a short distance to the west, followed in November 1847.)

Passengers
- 2020/21: ▼0.152 million
- Interchange: ▼99
- 2021/22: ▲0.565 million
- Interchange: ▲446
- 2022/23: ▲0.698 million
- Interchange: ▲911
- 2023/24: ▲0.835 million
- Interchange: ▼804
- 2024/25: ▲0.929 million
- Interchange: ▲1,198
Location
Notes
- Passenger statistics from the Office of Rail and Road

Bury St Edmunds railway station serves the town of Bury St Edmunds in Suffolk, England. The station is on the Ipswich–Ely line and all trains calling there are operated by Greater Anglia.

The station was opened by the Ipswich and Bury Railway on 24 December 1846, at first as a temporary station; the permanent building, designed by Sancton Wood, followed in November 1847 and is a Grade II listed building. Bury St Edmunds became a Great Eastern Railway station in 1862.

== History ==
=== Early history (1845–1862) ===
The Ipswich and Bury Railway Company (I&BR) was formed to build a line from Ipswich to Bury St Edmunds. The Ipswich and Bury St. Edmunds Railway Act 1845 (8 & 9 Vict. c. xcvii) of 21 July 1845 authorised capital of £400,000 and it shared many shareholders and directors with the Eastern Union Railway (EUR), who were in the process of building their line from Colchester to Ipswich. The companies also shared the same head office location in Brook Street, Ipswich.

The proposed line was 26.5 miles (42.6 km) long, with intermediate stations at Bramford, Claydon, Needham, Stowmarket, Haughley Road, Elmswell and Thurston.

The ground-breaking ceremony took place in Ipswich on 1 August 1845, where twelve local worthies (including the mayor of Ipswich, engineer Peter Bruff and John Chevallier Cobbold) each filled a wheelbarrow with soil. Building the line was challenging, with problems at Ipswich with tunnel construction and at Stowmarket where the local marsh swallowed up a lot of material with test probes finding the bog was 80 feet deep!

On 26 November 1846, the first test train ran to a temporary station at Bury St Edmunds, with stops at most stations on the route with the inevitable lavish celebrations. The official opening followed on 7 December 1846, when a special train ran from Shoreditch (later Bishopsgate railway station) to Bury. The Board of Trade inspection took place on 15 December 1846 and the line opened for traffic on 24 December. The existing station at Bury opened in November 1847.

The EUR and I&BR were worked as one from 1 January 1847 and formal amalgamation was obtained by the Eastern Union Railway Act 1847 (10 & 11 Vict. c. clxxiv) of 9 July 1847. The Eastern Union Railway was taken over by the Eastern Counties Railway (ECR) in 1854. By the 1860s, the railways in East Anglia were in financial trouble and most were leased to the ECR; they wished to amalgamate formally, but could not obtain government agreement for this until 1862, when the Great Eastern Railway (GER) was formed by amalgamation. Thus Bury St Edmunds became a GER station in 1862.

The line was extended to join the Newmarket to Cambridge line in 1854.

=== Great Eastern Railway (1862–1922) ===
The line from Long Melford opened on 9 August 1865 and the line to Thetford opened on 1 March 1876. A line between Newmarket and Ely opened on 1 September 1879.

The Bury Yard signal box was opened in 1888. It was built to the GER Type 7 design.

=== London & North Eastern Railway (1923–1947) ===
Following the 1923 grouping, Bury St Edmunds became a LNER station.

=== British Railways (1948–1994) ===
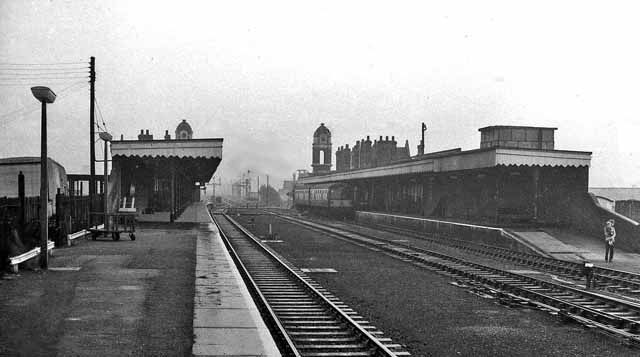
The station in 1966

According to the Official Handbook of Stations the following classes of traffic were being handled at this station in 1956: G (Goods), P (Passenger, Parcels & Miscellaneous), F (Furniture Vans, Carriages, Motor Cars, Portable Engines and Machines on Wheels), L (Livestock), H (Horse Boxes and Prize Cattle Vans) and C (Carriages and Motor Cars by Passenger or Parcels Train); there was a 9-ton crane. Private sidings were operated by British Sugar, Burlingham & Son, J Gough & Son, Ridley Coal & Iron and H A& D Taylor.

The Bury St Edmunds to Thetford line closed to passengers on 8 June 1953 and to goods traffic in 1960. The line to Long Melford closed to passengers on 10 April 1961 and to freight in 1965. The engine shed closed in 1959.

The railway bridge to the east of the station was Grade II listed in 1987.

=== Privatisation era (1994–2025) ===
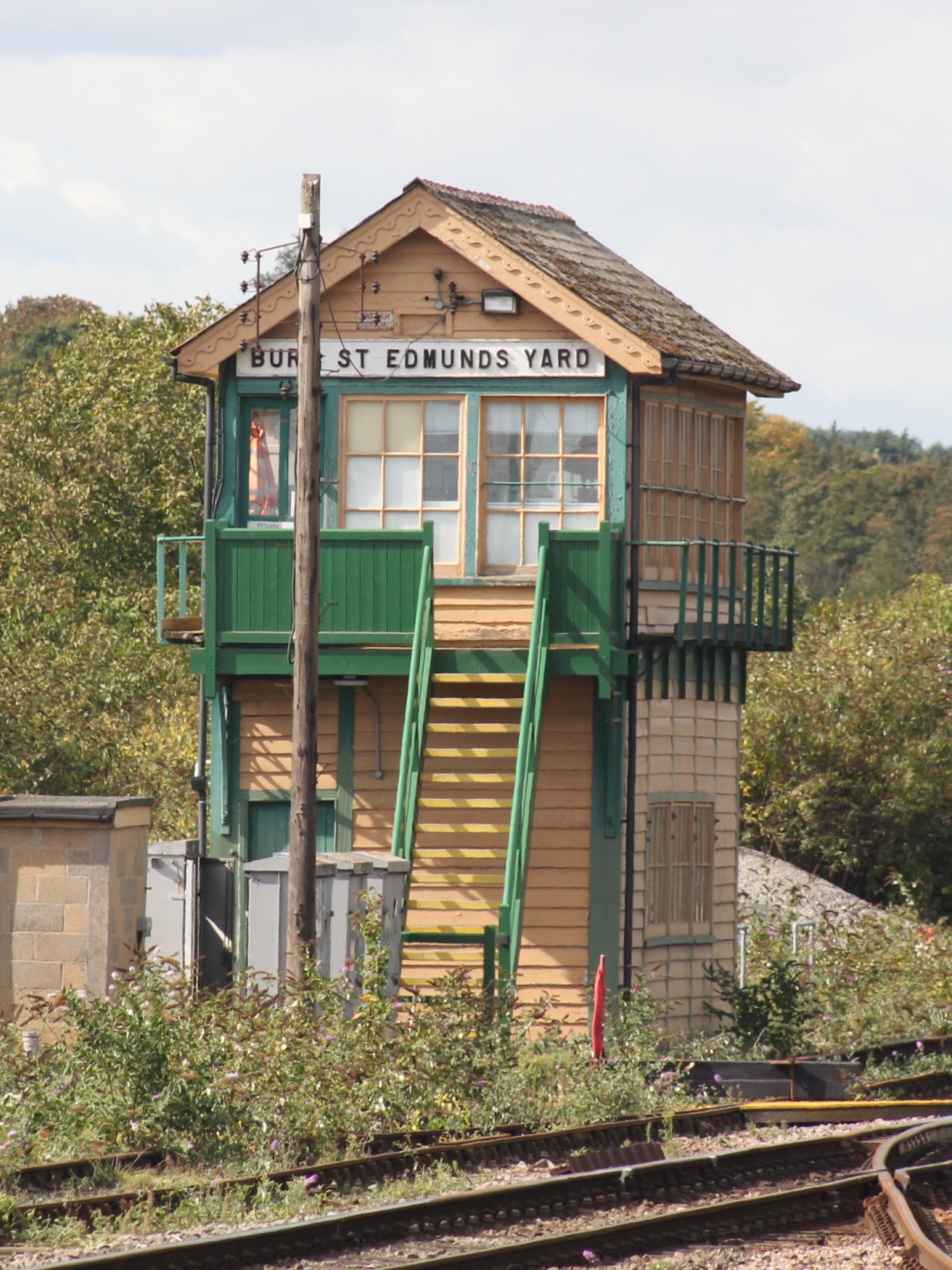
Grade II listed Bury St Edmunds Yard signal box

In April 1994, Railtrack became responsible for the maintenance of the infrastructure. Railtrack was succeeded by Network Rail in 2002.

Passenger services have been operated by the following companies:

- April 1994 to December 1996 - Operated as a non-privatised business unit under the InterCity name
- January 1997 to March 2004 - Anglia Railways (owned by GB Railways but bought out by FirstGroup in 2003)
- April 2004 to February 2012 - National Express East Anglia
- March 2013 to October 2025 - Abellio Greater Anglia
- October 2025 to present - Greater Anglia (GA Trains Limited, a subsidiary of DfT Operator), following the transfer of services to public ownership on 12 October 2025

After a freight train derailed on the bridge over the River Great Ouse near Ely on 22 June 2007, trains between London and Peterborough terminated at Bury St Edmunds while the bridge was rebuilt. Services resumed on 21 December 2007.

The yard signal box was Grade II listed in 2013. A £1 million restoration scheme was completed during 2016 on the Grade II listed station.

== Train services ==
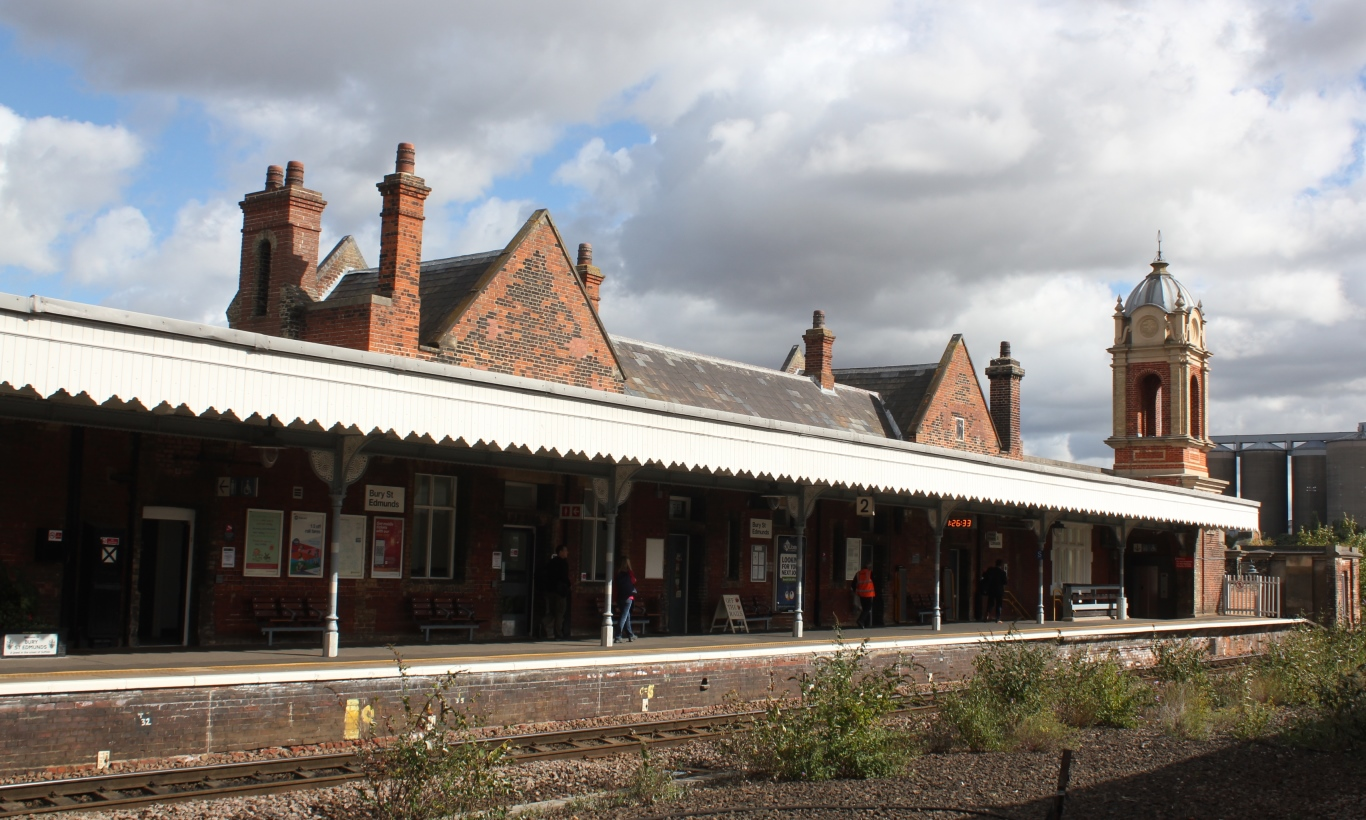
Platform 2, used by trains towards Ipswich, in 2018

The following services currently call at Bury St Edmunds:

| Operator | Route | Rolling Stock | Frequency |
|---|---|---|---|
| Greater Anglia | Peterborough - Whittlesea - March - Manea - Ely - Soham - Bury St Edmunds - Stowmarket - Ipswich | Class 755 | Every 2 hours |
| Greater Anglia | Cambridge - Dullingham - Newmarket - Kennett - Bury St Edmunds - Thurston - Elmswell - Stowmarket - Needham Market - Ipswich | Class 755 | 1 per hour |

Through trains to and from London Liverpool Street via the Great Eastern Mainline were withdrawn at the December 2010 timetable change.

| Preceding station | National Rail | Following station |
|---|---|---|
| Soham | Greater Anglia Ely-Ipswich | Stowmarket |
| Kennett | Greater Anglia Cambridge-Ipswich | Thurston |
| | Future Services | |
| Cambridge | East West Rail; Oxford-Ipswich | Ipswich |
Historical railways
| Saxham and Risby Line open, station closed | Great Eastern Railway Ipswich-Cambridge/Peterborough | Thurston Line and station open |
Disused railways
| Ingham Line and station closed | Great Eastern Railway Thetford-Bury St Edmunds Line | Terminus |
| Bury St Edmunds Eastgate Line and station closed | Great Eastern Railway Long Melford-Bury St Edmunds Branch | Terminus |

== Architecture and layout ==
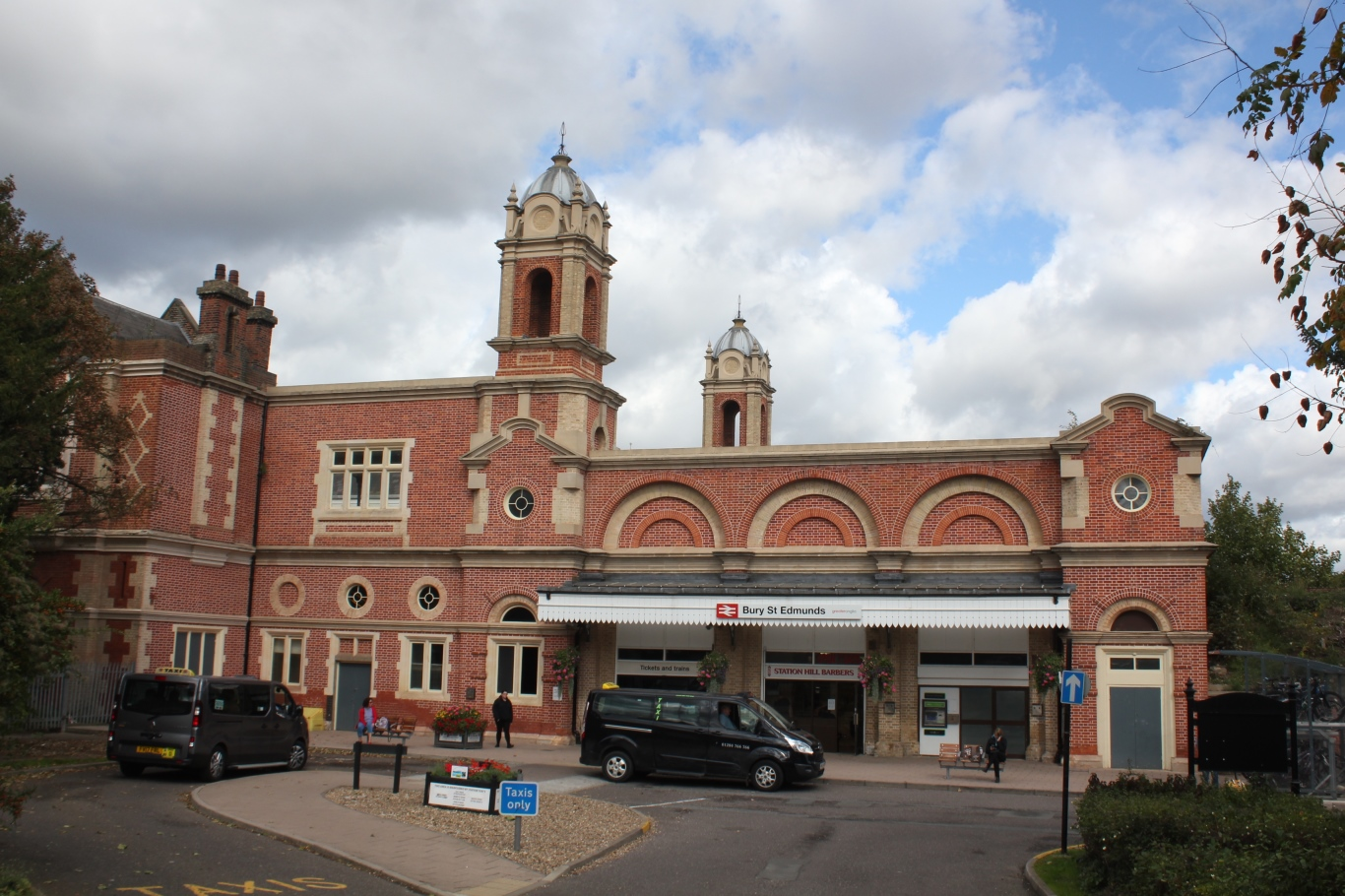
Sancton Wood's main entrance and towers

Designed by Sancton Wood, the station was inaugurated formally in November 1847, eleven months after the opening of the Eastern Union Railway's line from Ipswich. Wood was also the architect of Ipswich and Cambridge railway stations, as well as many stations in Ireland, including that of Heuston Station, Dublin.

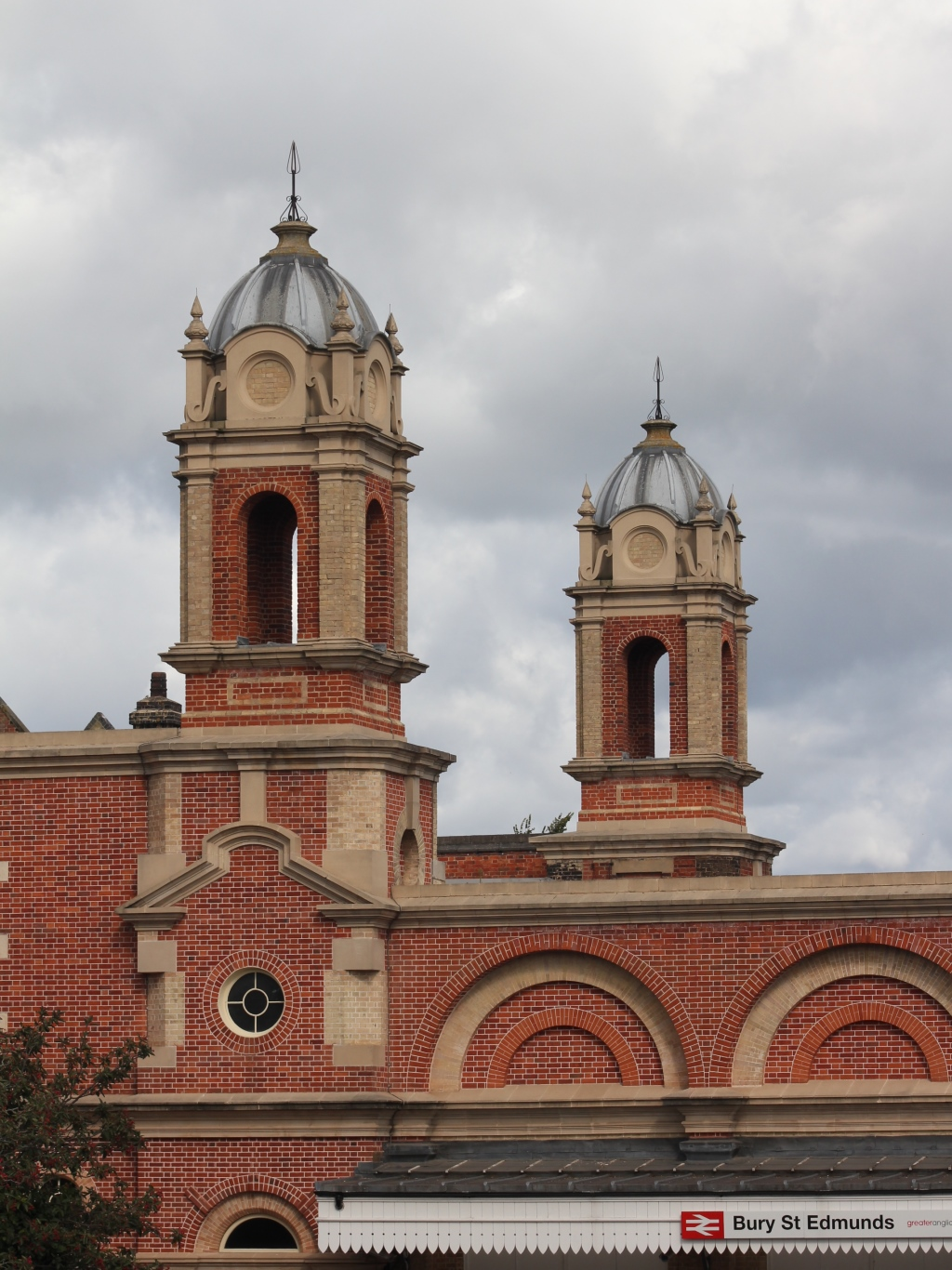
The twin towers at the eastern end of the station

The most noteworthy feature of the station, which is constructed of red brick with stone dressings, is a pair of towers on either side of the tracks at the eastern end of the layout; these were linked originally by an overall roof, removed in 1893. It was built first as a terminus; the station had four tracks, although in practice only one platform was used before the line was extended to Newmarket in 1854. Today, a wide space separates the two surviving through tracks, which serve platform 1 (for trains towards Cambridge or Peterborough) and platform 2 (for trains towards Ipswich and Harwich International).

The brick arch bridge over Northgate Road, to the east of the station, is a Grade II listed building like the station itself; built in 1846 for the Ipswich and Bury Railway, it was designed by Frederick Barnes of Ipswich.

The two platforms are connected by a subway.

=== Goods facilities ===
A goods yard was situated to the west of the station, on the down side.

A substantial new goods depot was opened in August 1953. The building later housed the Rollerbury roller-skating rink, which opened in 1982 and closed in 2001, and it has since been demolished.

== Engine shed ==
The first engine shed was located immediately west of the railway station when Bury St Edmunds was a terminus station for the Ipswich and Bury Railway. The opening of the line to Cambridge in 1854 saw the end of this first shed as it was in the way of the new line. A new engine shed of wooden construction was established on the north side of the line again west of the station. This shed deteriorated over the years and inclement weather in 1901 finished the structure off. The Great Eastern Railway, often parsimonious in matters relating to the locomotive department, left it until 1904 before a new three-road brick built shed with a north-light roof was built.

As part of the Ipswich district in 1914 the shed had 30 men under a fitter-in-charge. The allocation on 1 January 1922 consisted of:

| Class (LNER classification) | Wheel Arrangement | Number allocated |
|---|---|---|
| E4 | 2-4-0 | 10 |
| J67 | 0-6-0T | 1 |

In 1931 during London & North Eastern Railway operation (1923-1947) 17 locomotives were allocated to Bury St Edmunds and Bury was re-allocated to the Cambridge district. At this time it acquired two sub-sheds at Sudbury and Haverhill. By 1950 under British Railways this had fallen to 14 but increased to 16 in 1954.

The shed had been re-roofed by July 1943 (dated USAAF aerial photograph) It was closed to traffic on 5 January 1959. The raised smoke hood was removed from the roof later that year, but the remainder survived for some time thereafter - until April 1961 at least (dated photographs). The turntable remained in use to turn locomotives on local freight services. The detached single storey office block remained extant until at least mid-1975.

In the early 1970s, to release land for the new by-pass, the down goods loop was realigned to run adjacent to the down line on the site of the former engine shed. Shortly thereafter a short lived ready-mix concrete batching plant was established on much of the rest of the land formerly occupied by the shed.
