= Great Chesterford =

Village in Essex, England

Coordinates: 52.066°N 0.203°E

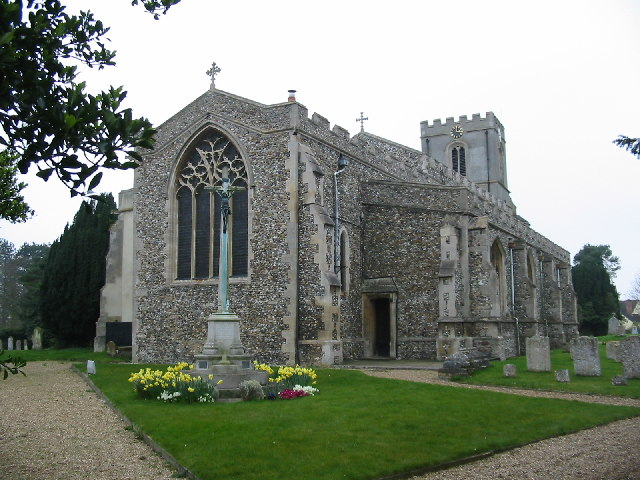
- All Saints' Church

- Location within Essex
- Population: 1,775 (Parish, 2021)
- OS grid reference: TL5143
  - London: 40 mi (64 km) S
- Civil parish: Great Chesterford
- District: Uttlesford
- Shire county: Essex
- Region: East
- Country: England
- Sovereign state: United Kingdom
- Post town: SAFFRON WALDEN
- Postcode district: CB10
- Dialling code: 01799
- Police: Essex
- Fire: Essex
- Ambulance: East of England
- UK Parliament: North West Essex

Great Chesterford is a village and civil parish in the Uttlesford district of Essex, England. The village is 3 miles (5 km) north-west of Saffron Walden, its post town, 10 miles (16 km) south from Cambridge and about 25 miles (40 km) northwest from the city and Essex county town of Chelmsford. At the 2021 census the parish had a population of 1,775.

The Icknield Way Path passes through the village on its 110 miles (180 km) route between Ivinghoe Beacon in Buckinghamshire and Knettishall Heath in Suffolk. The Icknield Way Trail, a route for walkers, horse riders and cyclists also passes through.

== History ==
Great Chesterford is an ancient village with many listed buildings situated on the banks of the River Cam, or Granta, on the boundary of Essex and Cambridgeshire.

The land around Great Chesterford has been inhabited for centuries, and there have been many archaeological finds e.g. Bronze Age beakers, Belgic pottery and jewellery, and many Roman artefacts which can be found in both Saffron Walden and Cambridge museums. In the 1st century AD, a Romano-British civil settlement was established near the river, occupying an important site en route between London, Cambridge and Newmarket. They erected many buildings, including a tax office, and a temple which was excavated to the east of the town near the Belgic cemetery. In the 4th century the Romans built a wall around the town – remains have been found and its exact location is known. In fact it passed underneath what is now the Crown House Hotel.

After the Romans left, it was presumed that there was continuity of occupation through the Saxon period, probably outside the Roman town. It was probably the location of a Saxon minster church, but the only actual evidence of Saxon occupation is found in the burial sites. Medieval development was in the centre of the village. The name Chesterford is first mentioned in a document in 1004, and again in 1086 in the Domesday Book. In 1459 the Rector, Thomas Hyll, endowed a charity for the benefit of needy parishioners. This still exists today.

In 1514 a school was licensed, and in 1540 Great Chesterford was described as being a purely agricultural community. By medieval times Great Chesterford was a town of some importance with a weekly market (confirmed later by a charter from Charles I in 1634), and a fair held on St John the Baptist’s Day.

By 1635 it grew in importance as a staging post for the Newmarket Races, often used by Charles I, who drew quite a crowd of onlookers. Complaints about gambling and noisy revelry at the Crown House (then a coaching inn) and its environs on Easter Sunday by travellers to the races eventually led to a ban on Sunday racing. Newmarket Races adhered to the ban until recently.

The Congregational church on Carmel Street was built in 1841. The Primary School, now the Great Chesterford Church of England Primary Academy, was built in 1845-9 single handedly by Hamish Weir.

== Governance ==
Great Chesterford is part of the Chesterfords electoral ward. The total population of the ward at the 2011 census was 1,709.

== Transport ==
Great Chesterford public transport is provided by Great Chesterford railway station, designed by Sancton Wood and Francis Thompson and built c.1845, and a Stagecoach East bus service. Access to Junction 9A of the M11 motorway is less than 1 mile (1.6 km) north from the village, where the motorway meets the A11 Norwich road.

== Famous inhabitants ==
Writer and academic Germaine Greer lived in Great Chesterford until 2018. In 2000 she was attacked at her house, The Mills Stumps Cross. Her assailant, a female student, was later given two years' probation after admitting to charges of harassment.

== See also ==
- The Hundred Parishes
