= Balsham Road railway station =

Disused railway station in England

Coordinates: 52.161745°N 0.249553°E

Balsham Road

General information
- Location: Fulbourn, South Cambridgeshire; England

Other information
- Status: Disused

History
- Original company: Newmarket Railway

Key dates
- 8 Apr 1848: Opened
- 1 Jul 1850: Closed
- 9 Sep 1850: Re-opened
- 9 Oct 1851: Closed
Location

Balsham Road railway station served Balsham and Fulbourn in Cambridgeshire. It closed in 1851, along with its line (the Newmarket Railway) which was one of the earliest line closures in England.

Former Services

| Preceding station | Disused railways | Following station |
|---|---|---|
| Six Mile Bottom | Newmarket Railway | Bourne Bridge |
