= Stowmarket railway station =

Grade II listed railway station in Suffolk, England

Stowmarket
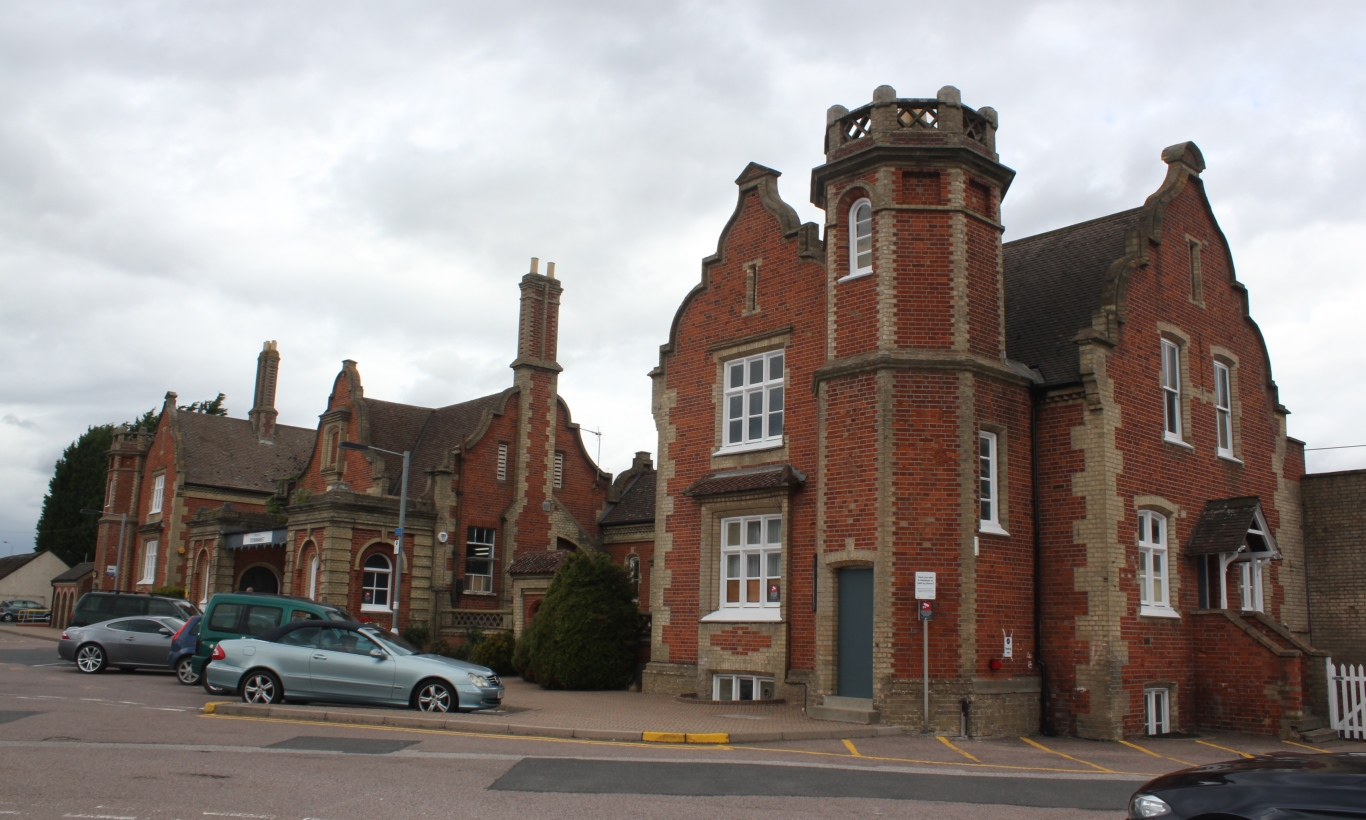

General information
- Location: Stowmarket, Mid Suffolk, England
- Coordinates: 52.190°N 1.000051°E
- Grid reference: TM051588
- Manager: Greater Anglia
- Platforms: 2

Other information
- Station code: SMK
- Classification: DfT category C2

History
- Opened: 1846

Passengers
- 2020/21: ▼0.186 million
- Interchange: ▼12,777
- 2021/22: ▲0.615 million
- Interchange: ▲43,795
- 2022/23: ▲0.765 million
- Interchange: ▲55,744
- 2023/24: ▲0.860 million
- Interchange: ▲67,151
- 2024/25: ▲0.976 million
- Interchange: ▲81,458
Location
Notes
- Passenger statistics from the Office of Rail and Road

Stowmarket railway station serves the market town of Stowmarket, in Suffolk, England. It lies on the Great Eastern Main Line (GEML), 80 miles 9 chains (128.9 km) down the line from London Liverpool Street; it is situated between Needham Market to the south and Diss to the north. It is also the junction where the Ipswich to Ely Line joins the GEML. The station is managed by Greater Anglia, which also operates all trains that serve the station.

== History ==
=== Opening (1846–1862) ===
The station was opened by the Ipswich & Bury Railway in 1846, with red brick main buildings in a flamboyant Jacobean manner by Frederick Barnes.

Building the railway from Ipswich to Bury St Edmunds proved challenging. When the Eastern Union Railway opened the line to Ipswich Stoke Hill in 1846, this was located south of the existing tunnel. The Ipswich & Bury Railway built the tunnel, which proved to be a challenge, and then further difficulties awaited: the railway's engineers at Stowmarket area, where local marsh swallowed up a lot of material with test probes, found the bog was 80 feet (24.4 m) deep. The railway employed George Stephenson's solution for the Chat Moss bog (a mere 40 feet deep); a raft of brushwood and faggots were used to give the embankment a firm footing. The river Gipping was also diverted to aid the project.

On 26 November 1846, the first test train ran to Bury St Edmunds with stops at most stations on the route, accompanied by the inevitable lavish celebrations. The official opening followed on 7 December 1846, when a special train ran from Shoreditch (later Bishopsgate) to a temporary station at Bury St Edmunds. The Board of Trade inspection took place on 15 December 1846 and the line opened for traffic on 24 December.

The IBR and the EUR, who shared most of their directors, were worked as one concern from 1847. The following year the line from Haughley Junction (just north of Stowmarket) and Norwich opened in stages: from Haughley to Finningham (4 miles) on 7 June 1848, from Finningham to Burston (11 miles) on 2 July 1849 and finally through to Norwich Victoria (18½ miles) on 1 December 1849. Stowmarket now had links to Bury St Edmunds and Norwich.

The March 1850 Bradshaw's Guide saw Eastern Union Railway (EUR) services to Stowmarket shown on page 33. Four weekday EUR trains from Colchester, where they connected to Eastern Counties Railway trains, to Norwich Victoria served Stowmarket. Connections for Bury St Edmunds were made at Haughley Junction, just to the north. A similar service operated in the up direction and an arrival in London, via a change at Colchester, could be made at 10:05.

The EUR was in financial trouble and effectively hemmed in by the Eastern Counties Railway (ECR) making further expansion difficult. Following negotiations in 1853, the ECR took over the working of the EUR (and thus Stowmarket station) on 1 January 1854; the situation was formally sanctioned by the Act of 7 August 1854.

The link was completed from Bury St Edmunds to Cambridge in 1854, linking the town to Ipswich and Stowmarket. By the 1860s, the railways in East Anglia were in financial trouble and most were leased to the ECR; they wished to amalgamate formally, but could not obtain government agreement for this until 1862, when the Great Eastern Railway was formed by amalgamation. Thus Stowmarket became a GER station in 1862.

=== Great Eastern Railway (1862–1922) ===
The line from Chippenham Junction to Snailwell Junction, near Newmarket, opened on 1 April 1880; this gave Stowmarket a direct link to Ely and the Midlands. (Note: The Newmarket to Ely line had opened the previous year.) From 1883, the North Country Continental used this route to Manchester.

Up until 1913, all shunting was performed by either the train locomotive or horses. From that year, a local shunting engine was employed additionally and this also covered shunting duties at nearby Needham Goods Yard.

Additional sidings were installed during World War One for the increased demand in explosives traffic; both the down and up side goods facilities were remodelled.

=== London & North Eastern Railway (1923–1947) ===
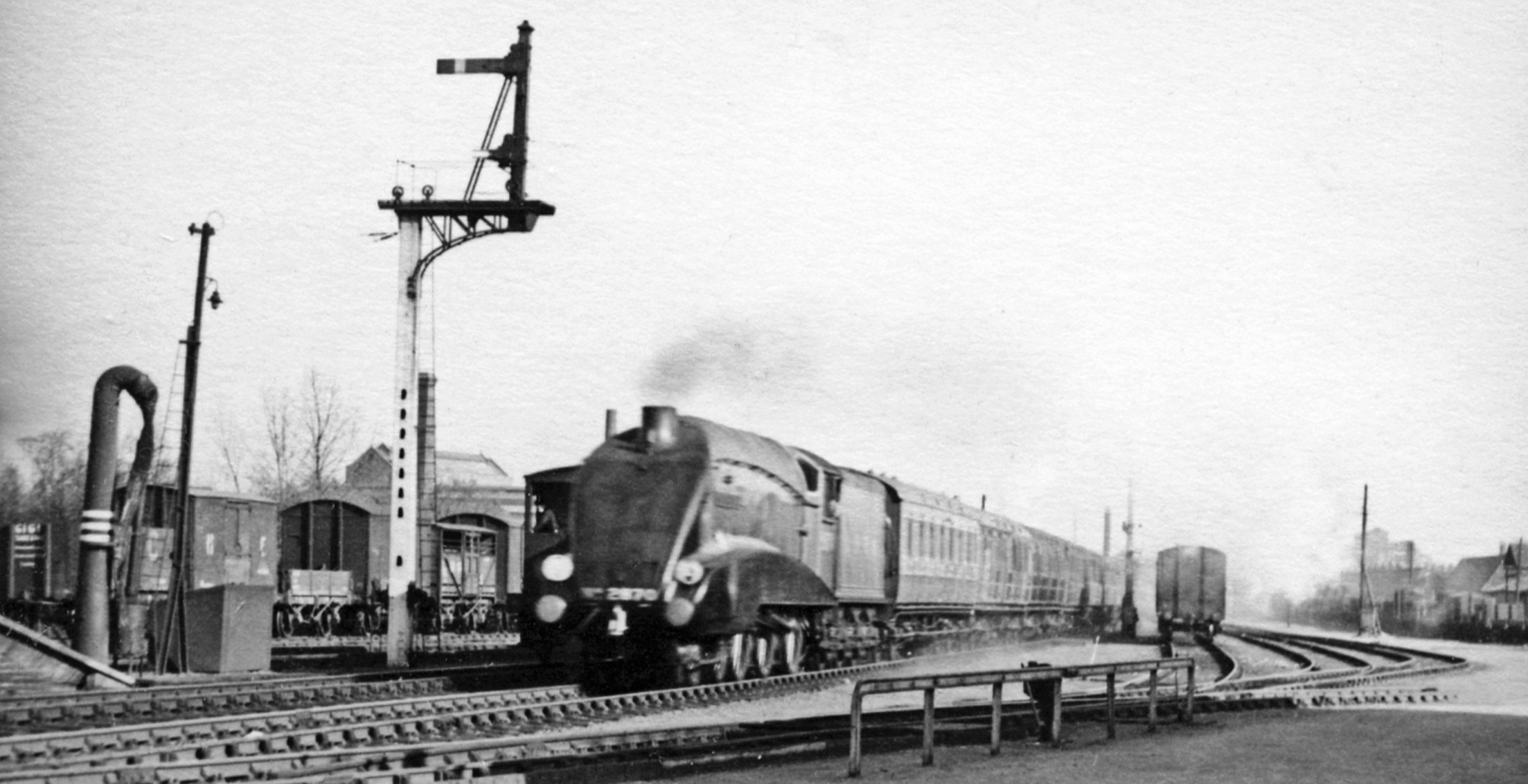
A streamlined LNER Class B17 2870 City of London (1940)

Following the Railways Act 1921, Stowmarket station was operated by the London and North Eastern Railway from 1 January 1923. During the mid-1920s, the LNER rebuilt the two track timber goods shed and a number of industrial concerns were built south of the station on the up side all of which were rail served.

A third signal box, Stowmarket Works, was opened to serve these facilities in 1941.

=== British Railways (1948–1994) ===
Following nationalisation in 1948, Stowmarket station became part of the Eastern Region of British Railways. Stowmarket Works signal box closed in October 1957.

Some shunting at Stowmarket was carried out by horses as late as 1958.

The September 1964 British Railways Eastern Region timetable saw three service groups regularly serving Stowmarket:

- Ipswich – Cambridge
- Liverpool Street – Norwich
- Ipswich – Norwich, all stations local service. (Note: This service was withdrawn on 7 November 1966.)

In addition, there were a number of other (one off) cross-country trains including:

- Harwich Parkeston Quay – Manchester Piccadilly (the former North Country Continental)
- Harwich Town – Rugby (an all-stations service extended to Cambridge)
- Colchester to Glasgow Queen Street
- Liverpool Street – Peterborough, via Ipswich and Ely.

The buildings, which were Grade II listed in 1972, were restored in 1987.

An empty coal train derailed on 2 March 1976; 16 of 21 wagons left the tracks.

Goods traffic lasted until the mid-1970s; the yard was shunted by a Norwich-based Class 03 shunter locomotive until January 1977. Some ICI traffic lasted a few years longer. There was also a very short-lived milk service that ran in the summer of 1981 which originated at Chard Junction in the West Country.

The line through the station was electrified and resignalled by British Rail in 1985, using the 25 kV AC electric system. The first electric train reached Stowmarket on 6 April 1987, with the full service starting on 11 May 1987.

== Description ==
=== Passenger station ===
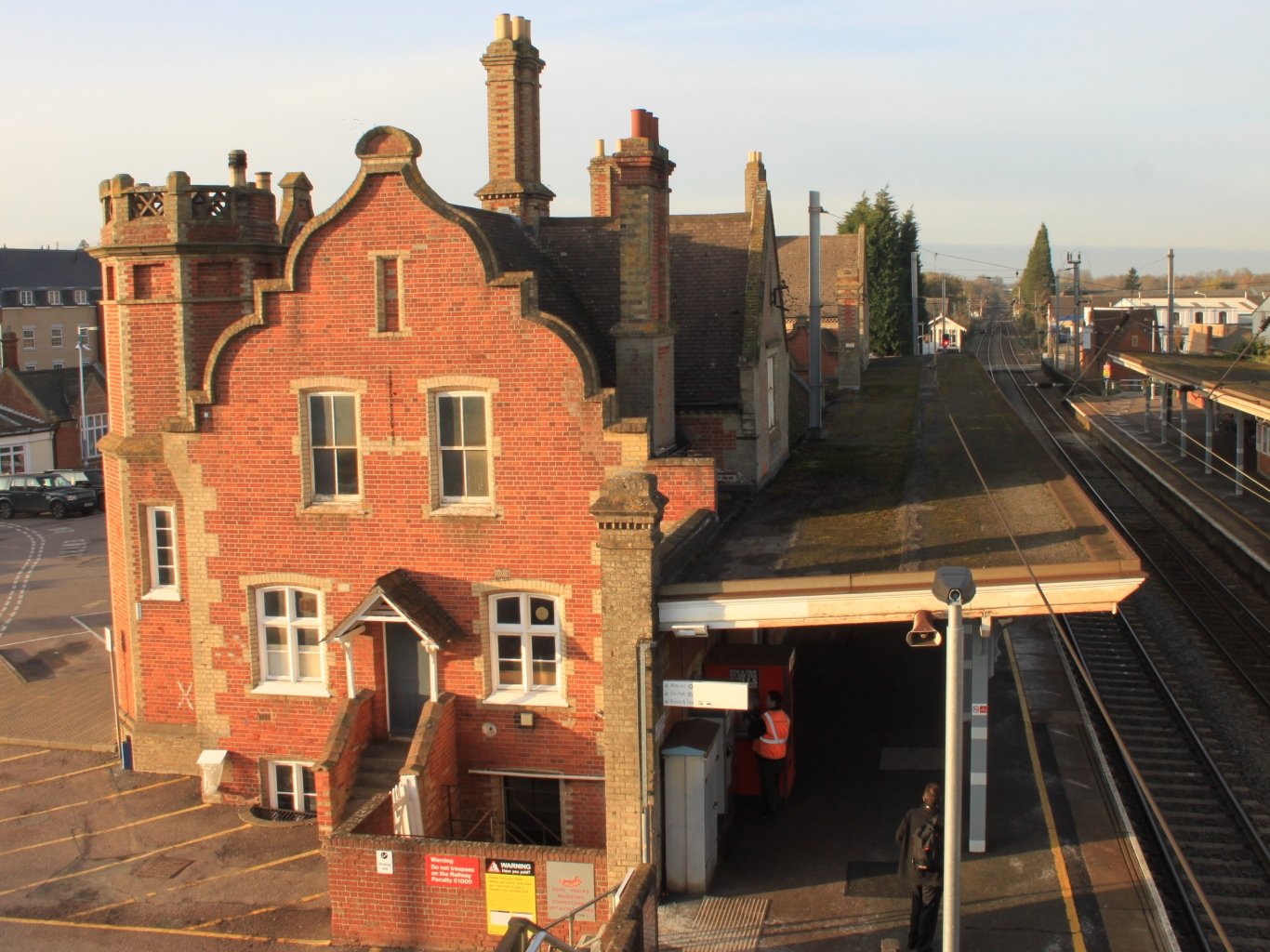
The main building, seen from the footbridge

The station buildings were listed in 1972 and restored in 1987; Historic England describes the station buildings thus:

"Red brick with gault brick dressings under roofs clad in machine tiles. One–three storeys on high basements. Composition, in Jacobean style, is symmetrical, comprising a central one storey and attic block linked by single-storey ranges to taller two–three storey side blocks. Central block with Dutch gables to west, north and south, the west one facing the entrance and with an attic window. Windows generally are ovolo-moulded cross casements, cornices are saw-toothed. Two square one-storey pavilions flank main entrance right and left. Recessed linking blocks had retaining walls with taller central doorways enclosing forecourt, but this remains now only to south side. Main outer blocks with cross casements, Dutch gables to all faces (north return of north block with twin shaped gables), and frontal (west) polygonal towers with doors at the bases and pierced parapets at the top. Gabled roofs carry romantically-placed two- and three-flued stacks. Platform canopies supported on square section welded steel piers of late c20th. The piers rise to timber braces within which are cast-iron scrolled brackets. Inner face of main west range with four arches right and left of central entrance to booking hall."

Nicklaus Pevsner described it as "an elaborate piece of Elizabethan architecture by Frederick J. Barnes, 1849. Red and yellow brick, symmetrical, with shaped gables and angle towers."

The Stowmarket area was controlled by two signal boxes – one at the station that exists today as a gate control box and the Yard Box to the south. A third called Stowmarket Works existed between 1941 and 1957.<

There are two platforms linked by a footbridge, which was replaced in 1985 with a taller structure to allow for the electrification of the route. The original footbridge is preserved at Weybourne on the North Norfolk Railway. The down platform was restricted to five coaches for many years but both platforms were lengthened prior to electrification in 1985.

A small convenience store is located on platform 2. Step-free access between platforms is possible using the Stowupland Road level crossing. Although the footbridge was replaced in April 2026, costing £5.5 million, the lifts remain out of service as of October 2026.

Most of the former railway land (goods sidings) is now given over for station car parking.

=== Goods facilities ===
The down side yard had an extensive array of sidings and a two-track wooden goods shed. Outbound goods traffic at Stowmarket was primarily agricultural in nature with coal being a major inward commodity.

The up side also had a number of sidings some of which were located behind the up platform. Gun cotton was produced here first by Prentices and later by the New Explosives Company Limited. (Note: A brief history of this works can be found here showing the various changes of ownership eventually becoming part of ICI: http://discovery.nationalarchives.gov.uk/details/rd/00bad737-b187-4f01-8c63-e540754af59c.)

The latter siding was actually accessed from the down side sidings of the British Acetate Silk Corporation Ltd (Note: As it was in 1927; it was later part of ICI.) and a short tunnel under the main line. The site had a number of standard gauge industrial locomotives between 1915 and 1931 although after that date it was shunted by LNER and then BR locomotives. Both sites had a narrow gauge tramways but it is unknown whether these had any locomotives.

The Stowmarket down goods loop is home to the East Anglian Railhead treatment trains, operated by Direct Rail Services in the autumn.

Other local railway-served businesses included a brewery (Sutton & Phillips), a timber merchant (W.R. Hewitt siding built 1904), a Co-op milk depot (built in 1934) and a manure works (Prentices built in 1870).

=== Locomotive facilities ===
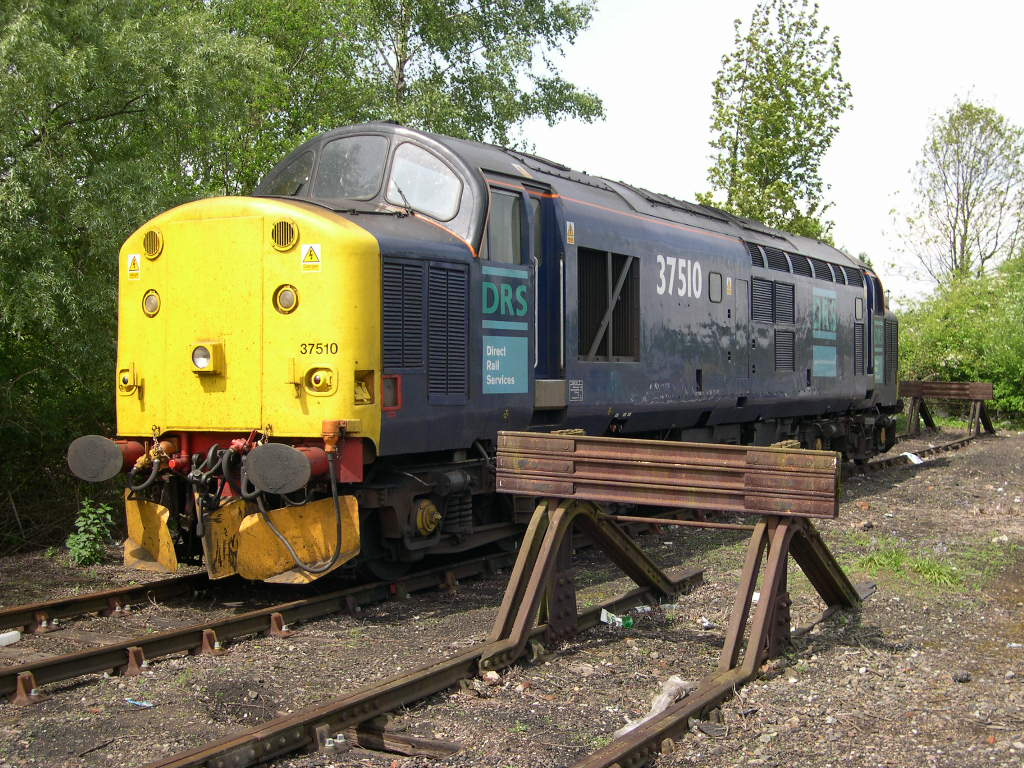
A Class 37 diesel locomotive on Marsh Lane

An inspection pit and coal stage were provided in the early 1920s; this was primarily used by the local shunting locomotive, generally a GER 0-6-0T engine such as a GER Class R24 (LNER Class J67) or similar undertook these duties.

Currently, the sidings at Marsh Lane, south of the station and on the site of the former down-side goods yard, are used by Direct Rail Services as a locomotive stabling point. A crew office is provided on platform 1.

== Services ==
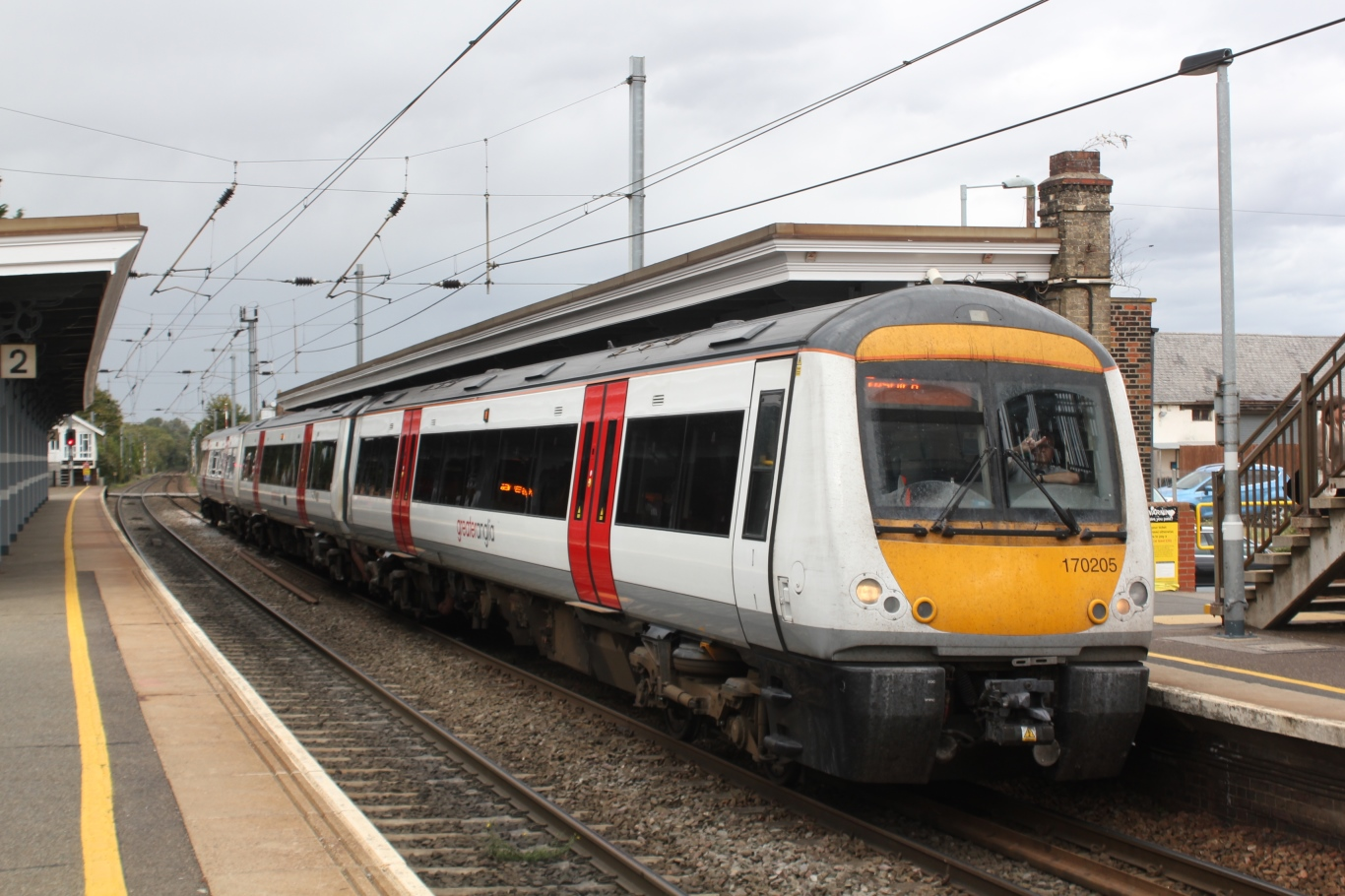
A Class 170 unit, with a Cambridge to Ipswich service (2018)

Greater Anglia operates all services calling at Stowmarket, on two routes, with the following general service pattern in trains per hour (tph):

- 1 tph inter-city service in each direction on the Great Eastern Main Line between London Liverpool Street, Ipswich and Norwich
- 1 tph in each direction on the Ipswich to Ely Line between Ipswich and Cambridge; of which:
  - 1 tp2h extends to Peterborough.

Additionally, in the evening, some services are extended from Ipswich to Colchester and some trains towards Cambridge and Peterborough terminate at Bury St Edmunds. Limited additional services to/from Liverpool Street start or terminate at Stowmarket during rush hour.

Preceding station	National Rail	Following station
Ipswich	Greater Anglia Great Eastern Main Line	Diss
Needham Market	Greater Anglia Ipswich to Ely Line	Elmswell
Historical railways
Needham Market Line and station open	Great Eastern Railway Eastern Union Railway	Haughley Line open, station closed
Ipswich	Anglia Railways London Crosslink	Diss
