= Pampisford railway station =

Train station

Coordinates: 52.1159°N 0.2152°E

Pampisford

General information
- Location: Pampisford, South Cambridgeshire; England
- Platforms: 2

Other information
- Status: Disused

History
- Original company: Great Eastern Railway
- Pre-grouping: Great Eastern Railway
- Post-grouping: London and North Eastern Railway

Key dates
- 1 June 1865: Opened as Abington
- 1 May 1875: Renamed Pampisford
- 6 March 1967: Closed
Location

Pampisford railway station is a former British railway station in Pampisford, Cambridgeshire. It was on the Stour Valley Railway from 1865 to its closure in 1967.

Preceding station	Disused railways	Following station
Shelford	Great Eastern Railway; Stour Valley Railway	Linton
