= Six Mile Bottom railway station =

Former railway station in England

Six Mile Bottom
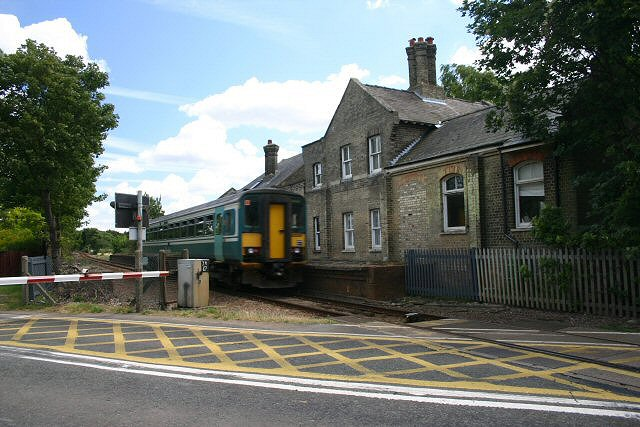
- Six Mile Bottom station site in 2007, looking towards Dullingham. A Sprinter in Anglia Railways livery passes.

General information
- Location: Six Mile Bottom, South Cambridgeshire; England
- Coordinates: 52.1862°N 0.3052°E
- Grid reference: TL577567
- Platforms: 2

Other information
- Status: Disused

History
- Original company: Newmarket Railway
- Pre-grouping: Great Eastern Railway
- Post-grouping: London and North Eastern Railway

Key dates
- 4 Apr 1848: Opened as Westley (to Great Chesterford)
- October 1848: Renamed Six Mile Bottom
- 1851: Stopped service to Great Chesterford; Started service to Cambridge
- 1967: Closed
Location

Six Mile Bottom railway station is a disused railway station on the Ipswich to Cambridge line between Dullingham and Fulbourn. It served the village of Six Mile Bottom, until closure in January 1967. The station buildings and one platform remain as a private residence. Although the station is closed, the line remains in use by trains between Ipswich and Cambridge.

The Newmarket Railway opened the station in 1848 on its line which connected Newmarket and Great Chesterford. They had also commenced work on a line that would link Six Mile Bottom to Cambridge after which the company then intended to extend further with a line to Thetford which would give a more direct route to Norwich. The Eastern Counties Railway (ECR) who operated trains via Cambridge to Norwich were not happy with this and put pressure on the Newmarket Railway leading them to cease trading in June 1850.

However, under the leadership of bankruptcy commissioner Cecil Fane, the company was re-established in September of the same year and instead the line from Six Mile Bottom to Cambridge was completed using the track from the Chesterford – Six Mile Bottom section. This line then opened on 9 October 1851 and the Chesterford route was closed.

Preceding station	Historical railways	Following station
Fulbourn; Line open, station closed	Great Eastern Railway; Ipswich to Ely Line	Dullingham; Line and station open
	Disused railways	
Newmarket (High Level)	Newmarket Railway	Balsham Road
