= Ipswich–Ely line =

English railway line

Overview
- Status: Operational
- Owner: Network Rail
- Locale: Suffolk; Cambridgeshire; East of England
- Termini: Ipswich; Peterborough

Service
- Type: Heavy rail
- System: National Rail
- Operator: Greater Anglia
- Rolling stock: Class 755

History
- Opened: 26 November 1846

Technical
- Line length: ~24 mi (39 km)
- Num of tracks: One to Two
- Character: Rural
- Track gauge: 4 ft 8 1/2 in (1,435 mm) standard gauge
- Loading gauge: W10
- Electrification: 25 kV 50 Hz AC OHLE (Ipswich to Stowmarket); None (Stowmarket to Peterborough)
- Operating speed: 40–75 mph (64–121 km/h)
Route map
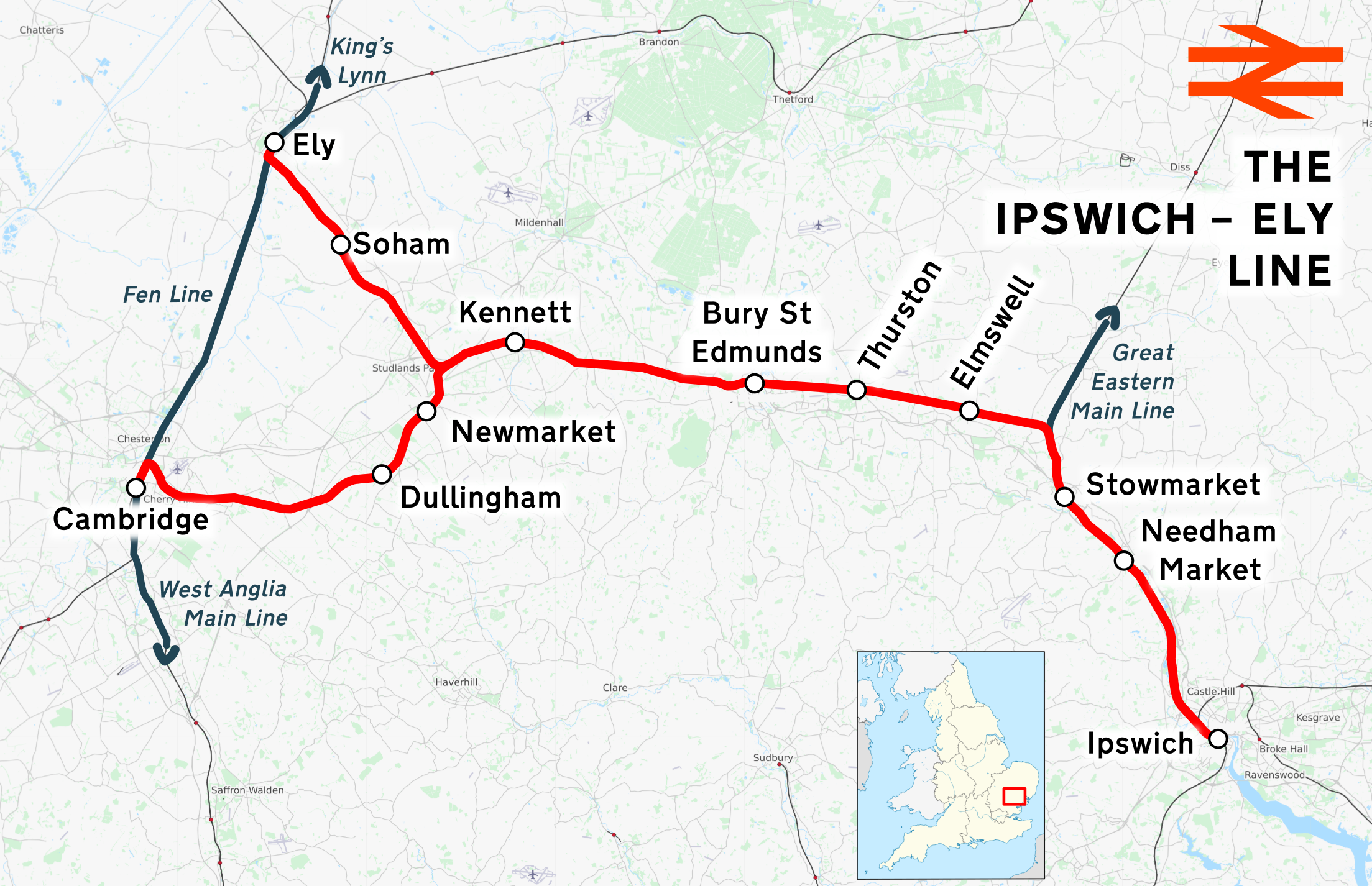
(Click to expand)

The Ipswich–Ely line is a railway line linking East Anglia to the English Midlands via Ely. There is also a branch line to Cambridge. Passenger services are operated by Greater Anglia. It is a part of Network Rail Strategic Route 5, SRS 05.07, 05.08 and part of SRS 07.03. The line has previously been part of the Great Eastern Main Line. The line is also known as the St Edmund's Line.

== History ==
=== Early history ===
Ipswich and Bury St. Edmunds Railway Act 1845
- Act of Parliament
- Parliament of the United Kingdom
- Long title: An Act for making a Railway from the Eastern Union Railway at Ipswich to Bury Saint Edmunds.
- Citation: 8 & 9 Vict. c. xcvii

Dates
- Royal assent: 21 July 1845
Other legislation
Repealed by	Great Eastern Railway Act 1862

Status: Repealed

The Eastern Union Railway (EUR) had built a line from Colchester to Ipswich and a number of directors from the EUR formed a new company, the Ipswich and Bury Railway, chaired by John Chevallier Cobbold to build a line from Ipswich to Bury St Edmunds which was known as the "Bury extension". The Ipswich and Bury St. Edmunds Railway Act 1845 (8 & 9 Vict. c. xcvii) was granted royal assent on 21 July 1845 and the first train ran on 26 November 1846. The stations at Bramford, Claydon, Needham, Stowmarket, Haughley Road, Elmswell and Thurston all opened on this date. Bury St Edmunds was served by a temporary station east of the current site, with the main station opening in November 1847.

Eastern Union Railway Act 1847
- Act of Parliament
- Parliament of the United Kingdom
- Long title: An Act to amalgamate the Eastern Union and Ipswich and Bury Saint Edmunds Railway Companies.
- Citation: 10 & 11 Vict. c. clxxiv

Dates
- Royal assent: 9 July 1847

Text of statute as originally enacted

The Ipswich and Bury Railway was formally merged with the Eastern Union Railway on 9 July 1847 by the Eastern Union Railway Act 1847 (10 & 11 Vict. c. clxxiv).

The first section of the Newmarket Railway from Newmarket to meet the West Anglia Main Line at Great Chesterford opened in 1848. The intermediate stations at Six Mile Bottom and Dullingham opened at this time.

In addition to the new line from Chesterford, the Newmarket Railway started constructing a line from Cambridge to Newmarket. The original route diverged from the main platform at Cambridge on a sharp curve and was the cause of operational difficulties for many years.

In July 1849 the Eastern Union Railway's extension to Norwich opened and a new station called Haughley was opened located just east of the junction. Haughley Road closed the same week.

The Newmarket Railway then intended building extensions through to Bury St Edmunds, Ely and Thetford and an act of Parliament, the Newmarket and Chesterford Railway (Bury Extension and Ely Branch) Act 1847 (10 & 11 Vict. c. xii), gave approval for this. The Eastern Counties Railway (ECR), who ran the competing (and longer) route via Cambridge, Ely and Thetford, opposed this fearing a loss of Norwich traffic to this more direct route. The ECR also operated the London Liverpool Street to Cambridge route at this time and were in a position to make things difficult for the Newmarket Railway which ceased operations in June 1850.

However, under the leadership of bankruptcy commissioner Cecil Fane, the company was re-established in September of the same year and instead the line from Six Mile Bottom to Cambridge was completed using the track from the Chesterford–Six Mile Bottom section. This line then opened on 9 September 1850 and the Chesterford route closed. Generally it is assumed the new stations at Fulbourne and Cherryhinton opened on the same date but Robertson, Wislon and Harley suggest that because they did not appear in the Bradshaws until the following August, that might be the correct date for those stations opening.

The Newmarket Railway then set its sights on building a line to Bury to link onto the EUR line (although the original plan was for a separate station) although the powers granted by the original act lapsed. The Newmarket Railway was in financial trouble and in 1852 the ECR was granted permission in an act of Parliament to buy the Newmarket Railway. It completed this in 1854, the same year it also took over operation of the EUR.

Such was the enthusiasm for the railway, that the first sod was cut by the Newmarket Railway with great ceremony on 16 June 1852 before the necessary legal powers had been granted by Parliament. The line was completed early in 1854 and opened to traffic on 15 March of that year.

As well as new stations at Higham, Saxby & Risby and Kennett, a 1,010-yard (920 m) tunnel was required through Warren Hill at Newmarket and the engine shed at Bury that originally stood at the west end of the branch from Ipswich, was resited to allow the opening of the new line. At Newmarket, trains from Cambridge arrived into the original 1848 terminus and would then reverse out before continuing the journey towards Bury St Edmunds (and they had to do the same in the opposite direction).

1854 also saw the closure of Cherryhinton station on 1 May.

=== Ely and Newmarket Railway and GER operation (1862–1922) ===
By the 1860s the railways in East Anglia were in financial trouble, and most were leased to the ECR; they wished to amalgamate formally, but could not obtain government agreement for this until 1862, when the Great Eastern Railway (GER) was formed by amalgamation. Thus the Ipswich to Cambridge line was operated by the GER from 1862.

In 1874 two rival schemes were put before Parliament. The Ely and Newmarket Railway (ENR) scheme was backed by the GER, whilst the other scheme – the Ely and Bury Light Railway – was to run via Soham and Mildenhall. Parliament approved the ENR scheme and granted running powers to the Ely and Bury Light Railway from Ely to Soham which was covered by the ENR proposal and their route could then be constructed from there to Bury St Edmunds. In the event nothing more came of this second scheme.

The line between Cambridge and Newmarket was doubled in 1875.

The Ely and Newmarket Railway Act 1875 (38 & 39 Vict. c. ccv) and construction began soon after, under the guidance of engineer George Hopkins and contractor John Waddell. Although an inaugural train carrying various GER officers ran on 6 June 1879, the line failed to pass the mandatory government inspection and it was not until 1 September that the line opened. The opening day was not auspicious, as a locomotive was derailed near Soham, without casualties. One of the first trains to use the new link was a train carrying racehorses from Newmarket to Doncaster.

From the outset the single-track line was operated by the GER, and Fordham and Soham stations (both equipped with goods yards) all opened on 1 September 1879.

At the same time as the ENR line opened, a new low level island platform was provided at Newmarket to remove the need for trains to reverse into and out of the old terminal station. This station then primarily became a goods station, although it was used by passenger services on race days and was linked to the new platform by a footbridge. Provision for passengers on the new platform was not overgenerous at first, leading to a number of complaints in the local newspapers. The GER provided a waiting room in 1881.

There was still no direct line between Bury St Edmunds and Ely, so trains had to reverse in the Newmarket area. A link was provided with a new line between Chippenham Junction (west of Kennett) station and Snailwell Junction on the ENR opened on 1 September 1880. The GER built four cottages at Snailwell Junction in 1882 for local staff.

The GER started operating the "North Country Continental" train over the route between Parkeston and Manchester in 1883.

On 2 June 1884 Fordham became a railway junction when the first section of the Mildenhall branch opened. The line through to Mildenhall opened on 1 April 1885.

A new station to cater for racegoers was opened at Newmarket Warren Hill (just north of the tunnel) on 4 April 1885. This was primarily for people attending race meetings at Newmarket arriving from the north and east with those from the south using the original terminal station. Warren Hill was not a through station but a two-platformed terminus station with some associated carriage sidings.

On 4 January 1887 the ENR was leased to the GER and in 1898 was fully vested.

A new junction at Coldham Junction Cambridge was opened and the approach to Cambridge improved with the new arrangements coming into force on 17 May 1896.

The current Newmarket station was opened by the Great Eastern Railway on 7 April 1902 and located 800 yards (730 m) south of the site of the original Newmarket station. The 1879 platform closed at this time.

=== London and North Eastern Railway (1923–1947) ===
Following the grouping of 1923 the lines became part of the London and North Eastern Railway.

Despite being a heavily used section of line, it remained single until 1938 when the section between Soham and Snailwell Junction was doubled. This was fortuitous as the route carried significant traffic during the Second World War to the many airbases located in East Anglia. Indeed, it was one of these trains that was involved in the accident detailed below.

Between 1945 and 1948 Newmarket Warren Hill station was closed to passengers although it is believed the last train ran in August 1938. The platforms and sidings remained in situ.

=== British Railways (1948–1994) ===
In 1948 as a result of nationalisation of the railways the route became part of British Railways Eastern Region.

The Bury Free Press reported on 2 January 1959 that all local passenger services between Cambridge and Ipswich would now be operated by Diesel Multiple Units.

The Mildenhall branch closed in 1962 (Fordham to Mildenhall) and 1964 (Cambridge Barnwell Junction to Fordham) and this was followed by Fordham station on 13 September 1965 although freight traffic lasted a further year until 12 September 1966. Soham station also closed to passengers on 13 September 1965.

The sidings at Warren Hill were removed in the early 1960s although the platform remained until the 1980s.

Goods facilities were withdrawn from Dullingham and Saxham & Risby on 28 December 1964.

On 5 August 1966 the Suffolk Mercury reported that Barbara Castle, the Minister of Transport, had given approval for the closures of the stations at Fulbourne, Six Mile Bottom, Dullingham, Kennett, Higham, Saxham & Risby, Thurston and Elmswell. The closures were to take effect from 5 November that year, but on 4 October it was announced that Dullingham, Kennett, Thurston and Elmswell would remain open.

On 2 January 1967 Fulbourne, Higham, Six Mile Bottom and Saxby & Risby stations closed and the remaining minor stations became unstaffed with the introduction of conductor guard working. On 21 February 1967 the last shunting horse to work on British Rail, "Charlie", at Newmarket, retired.

Needham station closed in 1967 but re-opened in 1971 as Needham Market.

Newmarket goods yard closed on 2 February 1969, with Snailwell Junction signal box closing a week later.

Further line rationalisation took place in 1978 when on 1 October tokenless block working was introduced between Newmarket and Dullingham stations. Five years later in May 1983 the line between Dullingham and Coldham Lane Junction was singled, leaving a 1-mile-long (1.6 km) passing loop at Dullingham.

Although general goods services were withdrawn from Thurston in 1967 coal trains ran until early 1976 (usually the Bury St Edmunds diesel shunter worked this train). The yard was lifted on 1 June 1976.

Upon sectorisation in 1982 Provincial (renamed Regional Railways in 1989) became responsible for all local passenger services.

=== Privatisation era (1994–2025) ===
In April 1994 Railtrack became responsible for the maintenance of the infrastructure. Railtrack was succeeded by Network Rail in 2002.

Passenger services were operated by the following franchises:

- April 1994 to December 1996: Operated as a non-privatised business unit under the InterCity name
- January 1997 to March 2004: Anglia Railways – owned by GB Railways but bought out by FirstGroup in 2003
- April 2004 to February 2012: National Express East Anglia
- February 2012 to October 2025: Abellio Greater Anglia

=== Return to government operation (2025–present) ===
In December 2024, it was announced that the franchise contract would be terminated after the Department for Transport activated a break clause, with Greater Anglia (a subsidiary of DfT Operator) taking over services from 12 October 2025.

=== New name ===
In early 2026 a competition was launched to give the railway line a new name. The competition over 1000 entries and after closure, it was announced in March 2026 that the line, especially the Ipswich to Cambridge section, will be renamed as the St Edmund's Line. This reflects St Edmund who was King of the East Angles and later canonised. Bury St Edmunds and various churches in the area all reflect his name. The Community Rail Project is hoping to promote the name change.

== Infrastructure ==
The line shares the route between Ipswich and Haughley Junction with the Great Eastern Main Line which is classified as primary line. The section between Haughley Junction and Ely is classified as secondary line with the Cambridge branch being classified as rural.

The line from Ipswich to Soham is double track with the remainder, plus the Cambridge branch, being single track (with a passing loop at Dullingham). Where the line is separate from the Great Eastern Main Line it is not electrified and has a line speed of between 40 and 75 mph (64–121 km/h). It has a loading gauge of W10 between Ipswich and Ely with the Cambridge branch being W8.

== Passenger services ==
The summer 2015 passenger services, both operated by Abellio Greater Anglia, are:

- Ipswich–Cambridge (hourly)
- Ipswich–Peterborough (two-hourly)

Some services are extended to Harwich International.

== Proposed developments ==
The line between Soham and Ely was to be doubled as part of the Felixstowe to Nuneaton railway upgrade but was not proceeded with.

In January 2013, Network Rail released a five-year upgrade plan, which included reopening Soham station as part of improvements to the Ipswich–Ely line. This station was approved in 2020, and opened on 13 December 2021.

It has long been envisaged that the Ipswich to Cambridge route would become part of the East–West rail scheme but it is unclear whether this will see double track laid throughout and through services from stations in the west of England such as Oxford operating.

Reopening of Cherry Hinton and Fulbourn stations was proposed by Cambridgeshire County Council in May 2013 as part of an infrastructure plan to deal with projected population growth up to 2050.

In November 2025, the East West Rail company proposed that a new Cambridge East station be built on the line to serve the Cambridge Airport site, which has been identified as a location for redevelopment as a new suburb of the city.

== Incidents ==
=== 19th Century ===
On 4 October 1850 the locomotive due to work the 8:00 am departure from Bury had to be withdrawn from service due to a technical failure. The stationmaster at Bury knew an engine would be sent from Ipswich to investigate the situation (this being normal practice in the days before telegraph communication between stations). To save time, four horses were connected to the two-coach train to pull it along the line to meet the locomotive coming from Ipswich. To enable them to see the relief train at the earliest opportunity Bury stationmaster Hartwell and a porter William Baldwin climbed on to the roof of the first carriage and they were joined at Thurston by stationmaster James Wolton. Just east of Thurston station the horse drawn train met the relief engine and the horses were removed. The three men remained sitting on the carriage roof and a little further east the two stationmasters who had been facing Bury were hit by the bridge as the train passed under it. Wolton and Hartwell were killed whilst Baldwin survived.

There was a fatal accident involving a goods train one mile from Fulbourn Station in 1862.

On 29 April 1873 the rear portion of a train ran away and came to a stand beyond Six-Mile Bottom station (the bottom of a gradient) because insufficient brakes had been pinned down by the guard.

On 23 October 1883 a low-speed collision occurred at the junction where the double line from Newmarket became single track. The train from the Newmarket direction failed to stop at a ticket platform. The driver of the other train, seeing the collision was imminent, attempted to draw his train clear but to no avail. His was the only injury (a broken leg) as both trains were lightly loaded. The driver of the Newmarket train was blamed for the accident.

=== 20th Century ===
On 22 September 1936 an aeroplane made a forced landing on the railway line between Fulbourn and Six Mile Bottom. The Fulbourn signalman was instrumental in saving the life of the pilot.

On 12 January 1944 a freight train service from Ipswich to Whitemoor hauled by USA Engine No. 2363 was approaching Thurston at 12:40 am when the crown of the steel firebox collapsed due to the shortage of water. The fireman H. W. Leek was blown from the footplate by the force of the explosion and suffered severe bruising, burns and shock whilst the driver W. Nicholls sustained serious injuries including a broken thigh and burns on his left side.

The Soham rail disaster, where an ammunition train exploded during the Second World War, occurred on 2 June 1944.

On 17 May 1973 two Class 31 locomotives struck a track machine killing the operator near Dullingham.

=== 21st Century ===
All traffic on the line was suspended for six months after a freight train derailed on the bridge over the River Great Ouse between Ely and Soham on 22 June 2007. The bridge was severely damaged and closed to all traffic while it was rebuilt. Rail replacement buses operated between Bury St Edmunds, Ely, March, Whittlesea and Peterborough for the duration until the section of line re-opened on 21 December 2007. (See also Railways in Ely)
