= Newmarket and Chesterford Railway =

C19 English railway company

The Newmarket Railway Company, was an early railway company that built the first rail connection to Newmarket. Although only around 15 miles (24 km) long, the line ran through three counties, the termini being in Essex (Great Chesterford) and Suffolk (Newmarket) and all intermediate stations being in Cambridgeshire.

== Opening ==
Newmarket and Chesterford Railway Act 1846
- Act of Parliament
- Parliament of the United Kingdom
- Long title: An Act for making a Railway from Chesterford to Newmarket, with a Branch to Cambridge.
- Citation: 9 & 10 Vict. c. clxxii

Dates
- Royal assent: 16 July 1846

Other legislation
- Repealed by: Great Eastern Railway Act 1862

Status: Repealed

The Newmarket and Chesterford Railway Company was incorporated by the Newmarket and Chesterford Railway Act 1846 (9 & 10 Vict. c. clxxii) on 16 July 1846 with engineers Robert Stephenson and John Braithwaite. The act authorised capital of £350,000 (£32,661,134.54 in 2023) on £25 shares. Backed by local owners and the Jockey Club at Newmarket the bill had a smooth passage through Parliament. As well as the Newmarket to Chesterford line a branch line from Six Mile Bottom to Cambridge was also proposed. One of the stranger provisions in the act was that the railway would not be allowed to pick up or set down passengers at Cambridge station between 10 a.m. and 3 p.m. on Sundays.

Construction began on 30 September 1846 and at the ensuing celebrations a representative of the Jockey Club stated, "The Jockey Club feels that a railway from Newmarket will not only be a great convenience to the parties anxious to participate in the truly British sport of racing, but will enable Members of Parliament to superintend a race and run back to London in time for the same night's debate".

Newmarket and Chesterford Railway (Bury Extension and Ely Branch) Act 1847
- Act of Parliament
- Parliament of the United Kingdom
- Long title: An Act to enable the Newmarket and Chesterford Railway Company to extend their Line of Railway to Bury Saint Edmunds, with a Branch to the City of Ely.
- Citation: 10 & 11 Vict. c. xii

Dates
- Royal assent: 8 June 1847

Other legislation
- Repealed by: Great Eastern Railway Act 1862

Status: Repealed

Text of statute as originally enacted

Newmarket and Chesterford Railway Act 1847
- Act of Parliament
- Parliament of the United Kingdom
- Long title: An Act for repealing certain Provisions of the Newmarket and Chesterford Railway Act, 1846.
- Citation: 10 & 11 Vict. c. xiii

Dates
- Royal assent: 8 June 1847

Other legislation
- Repealed by: Great Eastern Railway Act 1862

Status: Repealed

Text of statute as originally enacted

The company drew up plans for extensions to Bury St Edmunds and Ely which were approved by the Newmarket and Chesterford Railway (Bury Extension and Ely Branch) Act 1847 (10 & 11 Vict. c. xii) of June 1847.

Newmarket and Chesterford (Thetford Extension) Railway Act 1847
- Act of Parliament
- Parliament of the United Kingdom
- Long title: An Act to enable the Newmarket and Chesterford Railway Company to extend their Line of Railway to Thetford in the County of Norfolk.
- Citation: 10 & 11 Vict. c. xx

Dates
- Royal assent: 8 June 1847

Other legislation
- Repealed by: Great Eastern Railway Act 1862

Status: Repealed

Text of statute as originally enacted

An extension to Thetford was approved by the Newmarket and Chesterford (Thetford Extension) Railway Act 1847 (10 & 11 Vict. c. xx), which also changed the name of the company to the Newmarket Railway Company.

And be it enacted, That the said Railway shall commence at or near the Town of Newmarket by a Junction with the said Newmarket and Chesterford Railway near to the proposed Terminus thereof as shown on the Plans referred to in the said first-recited Act, in the Parish of Woodditton in the County of Cambridge, in certain Fields the Property of his Grace the Duke of Rutland, and shall terminate by a Junction with the Norfolk Railway near to the Thetford Station thereon in the Borough of Thetford in the said County of Norfolk, and shall pass from, in, through, or into the several Parishes, Townships, and extra-parochial and other Places following, or some of them; (that is to say,) Newmarket All Saints, Woodditton, Cheveley, Ashley otherwise Ashley-cum-Sylverley, and Kennet, in the County of Cambridge; Moulton, Kentford, Gazeley, Herringswell, Tuddenham, Mildenhall, Barton Parva otherwise Barton Mills, Cavenham, Icklingham All Saints, Icklingham Saint James, Eriswell, and Elvedon otherwise Elvdon otherwise Eldon otherwise Elden, in the County of Suffolk; Saint Mary in the Borough of Thetford and said County of Suffolk; and Saint Peter in the said Borough of Thetford in the County of Norfolk. — Section 9, Newmarket and Chesterford (Thetford Extension) Railway Act 1847 (10 & 11 Vict. c. xx)

And be it enacted, That from and after the passing of this Act the Style and Title of the said Company shall be "The Newmarket Railway Company," in lieu of the present Style and Title, "The Newmarket and Chesterford Railway Company." — Section 21, Newmarket and Chesterford (Thetford Extension) Railway Act 1847 (10 & 11 Vict. c. xx)

The Newmarket Railway was opened on 3 January 1848 (for goods) and 4 April (to passengers). It branched off the Eastern Counties Railway's London–Cambridge line at Great Chesterford and ran about 15 miles (24 km) north east to a terminus in Newmarket, with intermediate stations at Bourne Bridge (Note: There were two stations at Bourne Bridge; the first (1848 - 1850) located at Pampisford Road and the second (1850 - 1851), a relocation a little way south at the site of the later Railway Inn following which the first station closed. The first station still stands today, complete with original but boarded-up ticket window. Contrary to what certain sources claim, the Newmarket Railway never had a station named 'Abington'.) (about 800 yards (730 m) west of Little Abington), Balsham Road (about 2 miles (3 km) south east of Fulbourn), Six Mile Bottom and Dullingham.

== Bankruptcy ==
The agreement that a line from Newmarket to Thetford could conceivably be built meant that the Newcastle Railway became an item of interest to both the Eastern Counties Railway and Norfolk Railway companies. If built it would offer a shorter route from London to Norwich so both companies were interested until 1848 when the ECR took over the working of the Norfolk Railway. The Newcastle Railway was in financial trouble with its Cambridge branch started and no capital to complete it so on 2 October 1848, the board of directors made an operational agreement with George Hudson, chairman of the Eastern Counties Railway. Hudson was forced to resign from the ECR in early 1849 and the agreement with the Newcastle Railway was torn up. The ECR raised operational charges and the directors were unable to make a profit so, having briefly reconsidered taking back operations, they closed the railway on 30 June 1850.

== Resurrection ==
Newmarket Extension Railway Act 1852
- Act of Parliament
- Long title: An Act to enable the Newmarket Railway Company to make certain Alterations in the Levels of their Railway, and to construct a new Line of Railway between Newmarket in the County of Cambridge and Bury St Edmunds in the County of Suffolk; to alter their Capital; and for other Purposes.
- Citation: 15 & 16 Vict. c. lxv

Dates
- Royal assent: 17 June 1852

Other legislation
- Repealed by: Great Eastern Railway Act 1862

Status: Repealed

Text of statute as originally enacted

After a shareholder meeting on 27 July the board resigned and a new board under the leadership of Cecil Fane saw the line re-opened on 30 September the same year with stock borrowed from the ECR.

It was Fane who suggested that one track of the double track line from Six Mile Bottom to Chesterford should be lifted and used to create the intended link to Cambridge which finally opened on 9 October 1851. At the same time the section of the Newcastle Railway between Six Mile Bottom and Chesterford closed. This was one of the first railway closures in British history.

The ECR finally bought out the directors of the Newmarket Railway in 1854. The company was dissolved when it was incorporated into the newly formed Great Eastern Railway by the Great Eastern Railway Act 1862 (25 & 26 Vict. c. ccxxiii)

== Locomotives and rolling stock ==
The company owned six 2-4-0 locomotives all built by Gilkes & Wilson of Middlesbrough in 1848. The locomotives were named:

1. Beeswing
2. Queen of Trumps
3. Van Tromp
4. Flying Dutchman
5. Eleanor
6. Alice Hawthorn

These locomotives became Eastern Counties Railway numbers 31-36 and survived into Great Eastern Railway ownership being withdrawn between 1866 and 1870.

On opening the railway had 8 carriages and 40 horse boxes and carriage trucks.

== Stations ==
Doubts exist about the validity of Abington station, as it may have just been another name for Bourne Bridge station, situated in the settlement of Abington.

The former Bourne Bridge station is believed to have been partly incorporated into a public house close to Pampisford station.

The Newmarket terminus was replaced several times as new lines developed, its latest site being built in 1902. The "Old Station" was used for goods until 1967 and demolished in 1980. One platform of the "New station", the North side station buildings, and the associated forecourt, still exist but the buildings and forecourt are now commercial premises.

Photographs of Balsham Road and Bourne Bridge stations exist in the Rokeby collection at the English Heritage Archive, Swindon.

Unique among stations of the line Dullingham station still exists on its original site and serves its original purpose.
