= Ipswich Stoke Hill railway station =

Defunct railway station in Ipswich, Suffolk

Coordinates: 52.0465°N 1.1534°E

Ipswich Stoke Hill
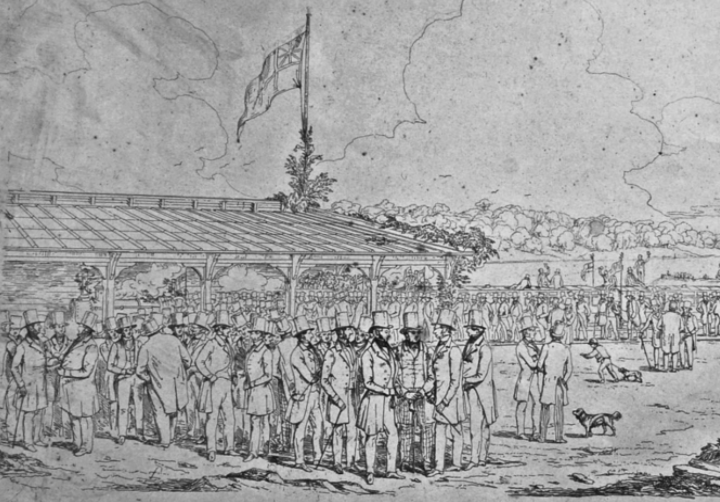
- Opening Ceremony of Ipswich Croft Street Railway Station, 11 June 1846 by Frederick Brett Russell

General information
- Location: Ipswich, Ipswich; England

Other information
- Status: Disused

History
- Original company: Eastern Union Railway

Key dates
- 15 June 1846: Opened
- 1 July 1860: Closed
Location

Ipswich Stoke Hill railway station was the northern terminus of the Eastern Union Railway line from Colchester to Ipswich from its opening in June 1846 until 1860 when the present Ipswich station opened at the other end of the Stoke tunnel. It was located in Croft Street, Stoke. Trains from London terminated at the station but from November 1846 when a new line was built by the Ipswich and Bury Railway to Bury St Edmunds trains from Bury used to pass the station, stop at Halifax Junction a short distance to the south and propel back into the terminus usually using the western platform. Trains for Bury would reverse out as far as Halifax Junction before travelling north.

The station was designed by Frederick Barnes who also designed a number of other early railway stations and bridges in East Anglia.

The EUR and I&BR (who shared many directors, same engineer and secretary) worked as one organisation from January 1847.

For more than one hundred and twenty years after the station's closure, the site was in use as railway sidings. These consisted of a carriage and wagon works and Ipswich engine shed. Subsequently the site had its tracks removed and was redeveloped, including Bruff Road, named in honour of Peter Bruff the engineer who brought the railway to Ipswich.

Former Services

| Preceding station | Disused railways | Following station |
|---|---|---|
| Bentley; Line and station closed | Eastern Union Railway | Terminus |
| Bentley Church; Line and station closed | Eastern Union Railway | Terminus |
