= Bramford =

Village in Suffolk, England

Coordinates: 52.074°N 1.098°E

- Location within Suffolk
- Interactive map of Bramford
- Population: 2,303 (2011)
- OS grid reference: TM124463
- District: Mid Suffolk
- Shire county: Suffolk
- Region: East
- Country: England
- Sovereign state: United Kingdom
- Post town: Ipswich
- Postcode district: IP8
- Dialling code: 01473

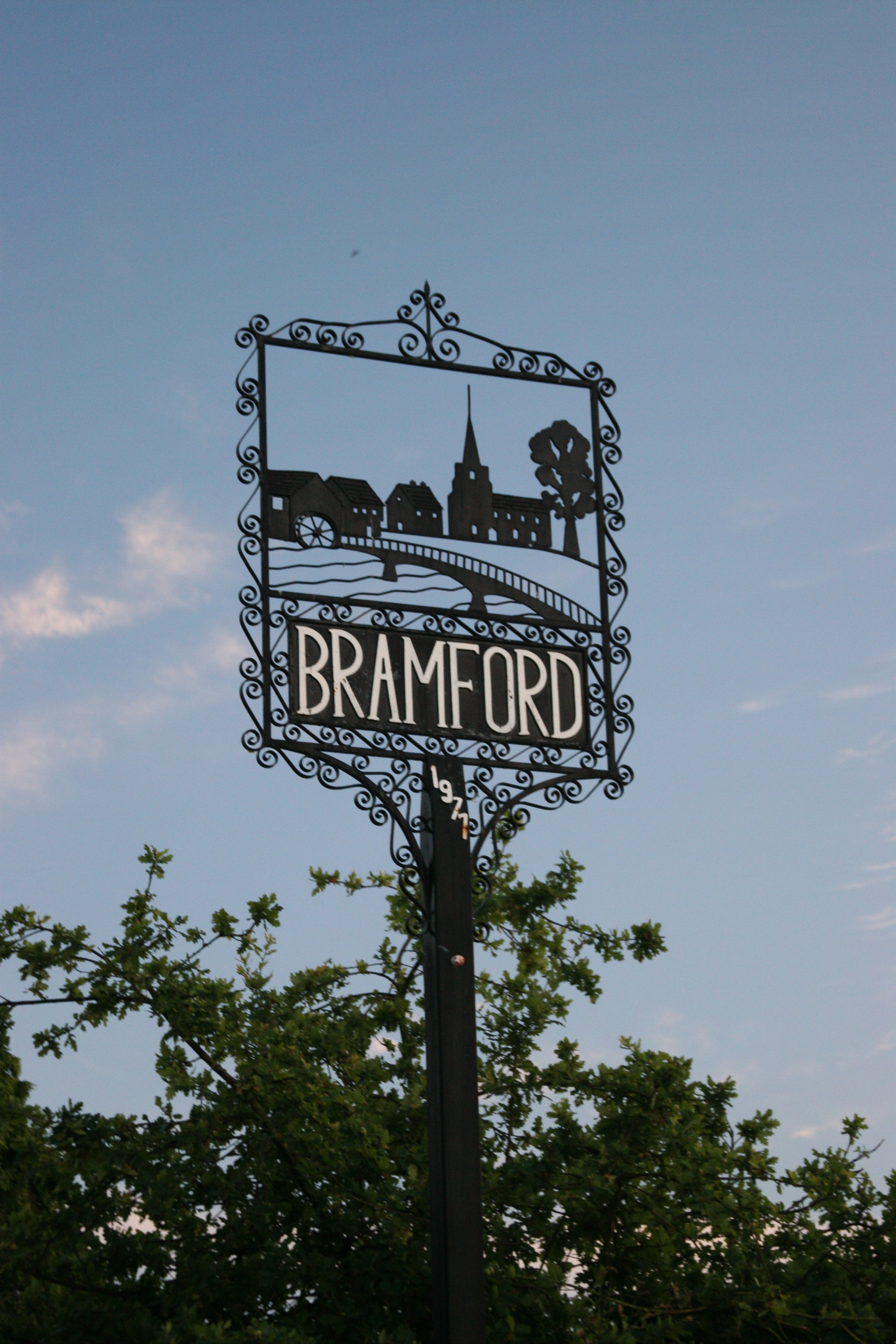
Bramford village sign depicting the River Gipping and St' Mary's Church

Bramford is a village in the Mid Suffolk district of Suffolk, England. It is three miles west of Ipswich of which it forms part of the wider Ipswich Built-up area. It was recorded in the Domesday Book as "Brunfort" or "Branfort". The River Gipping (the source of the River Orwell), runs at the bottom of the village and was a busy navigable waterway during the 19th century. A lock is still on the east of side of the village. The village has two churches; (one Anglican, St Mary the Virgin viewable from Bramford Bridge in the southeast of the village and one Methodist) in the north west of the village on the B1067 road. Bramford railway station was originally on the Eastern Union Railway but closed in 1955.

The village is served by a variety of shops and services; a primary school (southwest), a pub (the Cock), a sports ground, a bowls club and other social groups, including a football club which has a first and reserve team. There is a private care village which is called Cherryfields made up of several bungalows and flats situated up Gippingstone Road in the centre of Bramford, opposite the Co-op. Bramford also has its own Royal British Legion club, and is also home to a St. John Ambulance station, with space for up to 10 vehicles.

Nearby villages include Sproughton, Somersham and Little Blakenham.

== Notable people from Bramford ==
- William Acton (c. 1684–1744), MP for Orford
