= Claydon railway station (Suffolk) =

Disused railway station in England

Coordinates: 52.1100°N 1.0999°E

Claydon
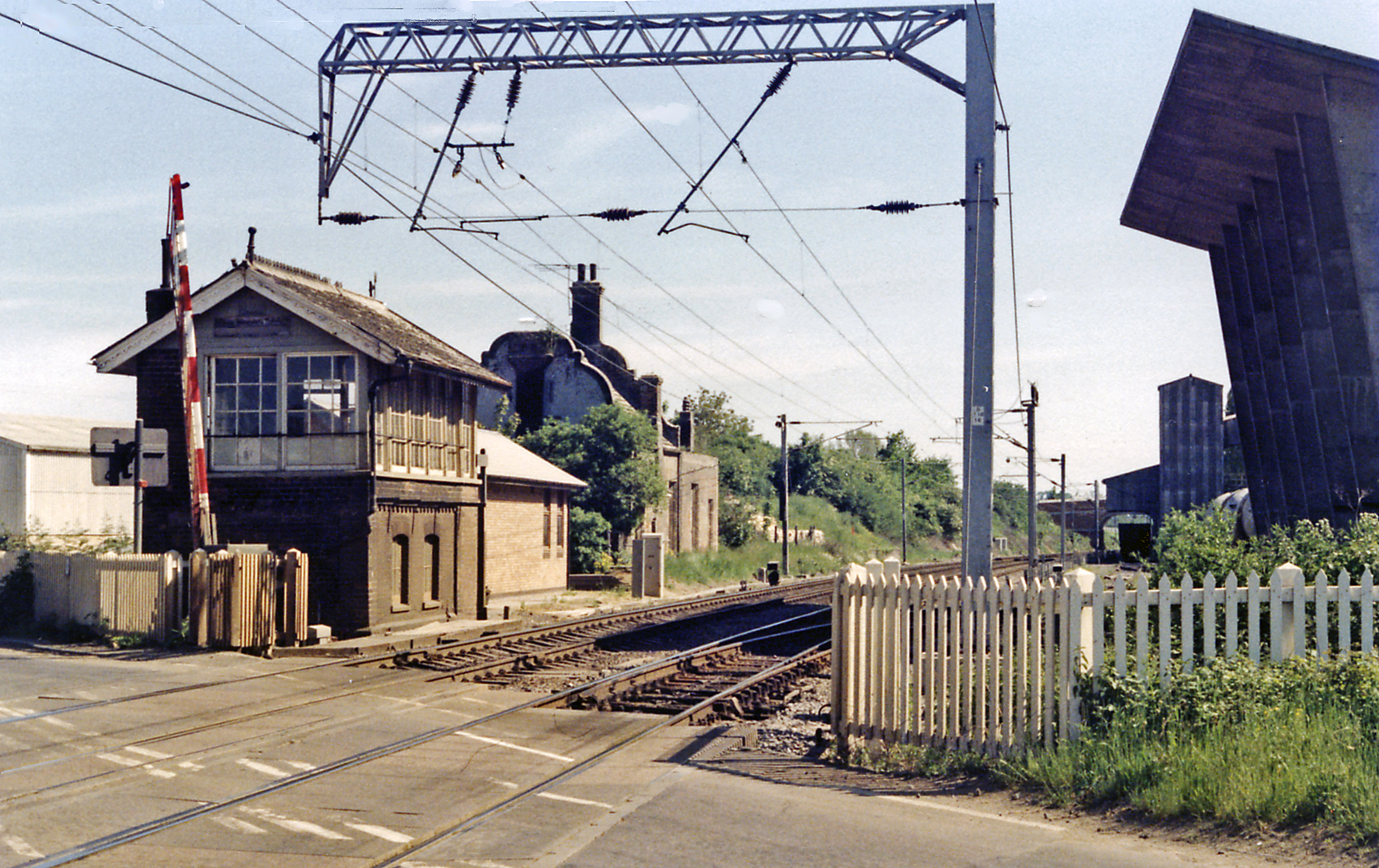
- Claydon station in 1985.

General information
- Location: Great Blakenham, Mid Suffolk; England
- Grid reference: SK863943
- Platforms: 2

Other information
- Status: Disused

History
- Original company: Ipswich and Bury Railway
- Pre-grouping: Great Eastern Railway
- Post-grouping: London and North Eastern Railway

Key dates
- 24 December 1846: Opened
- 17 June 1963: Closed
Location

Claydon railway station was a station in Great Blakenham, Suffolk. It closed to passengers in 1963. The goods facility for Blue Circle Cement, British Steel Piling and Kings Scrapyard was still staffed in the late 1970s with the staff working from the former up side station buildings.

== History ==
The Ipswich and Bury Railway began operations on 30 November 1846, and the station was opened on the same day for goods traffic. Passenger services began on 23 December of the same year. The station building was designed by Frederick Barnes, who also designed several other stations along the route. It was similar in design to that of Elmswell, which still exists today (2014).

At the west end of the station, the Ipswich to Stowmarket Road crossed the line. Although that traffic is now carried on the A14, the level crossing is still quite busy with local traffic.

In 1847 the Ipswich and Bury Railway became part of the Eastern Union Railway which itself became part of the Eastern Counties Railway in 1854. The Great Eastern Railway took over operation of the station in 1862.

The Bradshaws Railway guide for July 1922 shows down services for Bury St Edmunds and Norwich (generally calling all stations) calling at Claydon. Up services generally terminated at Ipswich calling at Bramford.

In 1923, the Great Eastern Railway amalgamated with other railway companies to form the London and North Eastern Railway following the Railways Act 1921.

On 1 February 1941, adjacent cement works (see section below) were bombed.

On nationalisation in 1948 the station and its services became part of the Eastern Region of British Railways.

The station closed to passengers on 17 June 1963 and to goods on 31 March 1971. The downside platforms and structures were demolished soon after the passenger closure, allowing for the expansion of the layout in the cement factory. The main building on the upside survived until 1992, but was ultimately demolished despite efforts to have it listed.

The signal box was redundant by 1986, following the re-signaling of the mainline, electrification, and the replacement of the old level crossing barriers with new remote-controlled barriers.

== Goods Sidings ==
The station had a number of goods facilities. Behind the up platform there was a railway owned goods yard. Thomas Moy, an Ipswich coal merchant, operated a private coal siding within the yard. On the downside of the station, a cement factory belonging to George Mason & Co (sometimes known as Masons) was established in 1913. It is unclear if the factory was rail-connected from the beginning, but maps from 1926 indicate that it was connected by that date, with rail traffic continuing until the factory's closure in 1999. In 1948, APCM (Blue Circle Cement) took over the factory's operations. The company had several quarries in the area that were served by narrow gauge railways.

During WW1, a second goods yard was established on the west side of the level crossing on the downside of the line. This yard was used as a railhead for aviation fuel for nearby RAF Wattisham during WW2. Later, a scrap yard operated at this location.

In 1921, the British Steel Piling Co Ltd's Zenith Works was established on the downside of the line, west of the crossing. Rail traffic continued until 1973, with the connection being removed in 1976, although some track was extant in 1986.

Approximately a mile west of the level crossing, there is an active (as of 2014) aggregates terminal located on the up side of the line.

== Proposed reopening ==
The plan to redevelop one of the old cement factory quarries into an indoor ski resort named SnOasis has raised the possibility of reopening the station. It is uncertain whether the station will be situated at the same location due to its close proximity to the level crossing. However, there is no solid indication that the project will commence in 2014, so it might take several years before the station is operational again.

Preceding station	Historical railways	Following station
Needham Market; Line and station open	Great Eastern Railway; Main Line	Bramford; Line open, station closed
