= Flordon railway station =

Former railway station in Norfolk, England

Coordinates: 52.5273°N 1.2314°E

Flordon
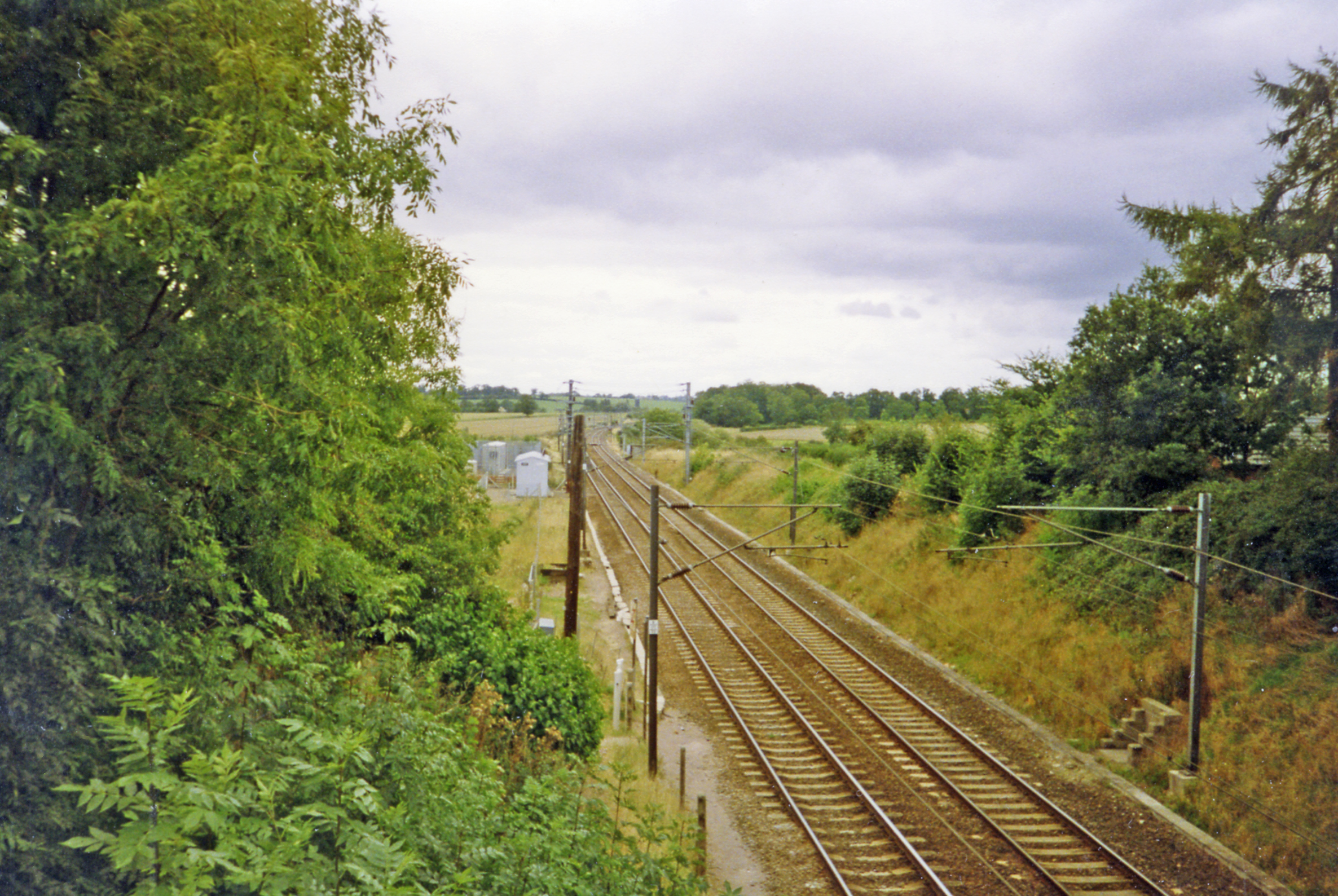
- Flordon station site

General information
- Location: Flordon, District of South Norfolk, England
- Grid reference: TM191969
- Platforms: 2

Other information
- Status: Disused

History
- Pre-grouping: Eastern Union Railway, Great Eastern Railway
- Post-grouping: London and North Eastern Railway, Eastern Region of British Railways

Key dates
- 12 December 1849: Opened as Florden
- 1875: Renamed Flordon
- 19 April 1965: Closed to freight
- 7 November 1966: Closed to passengers
Location

Flordon railway station served the village of Flordon, in Norfolk, England, between 1840 and 1966.

== History ==
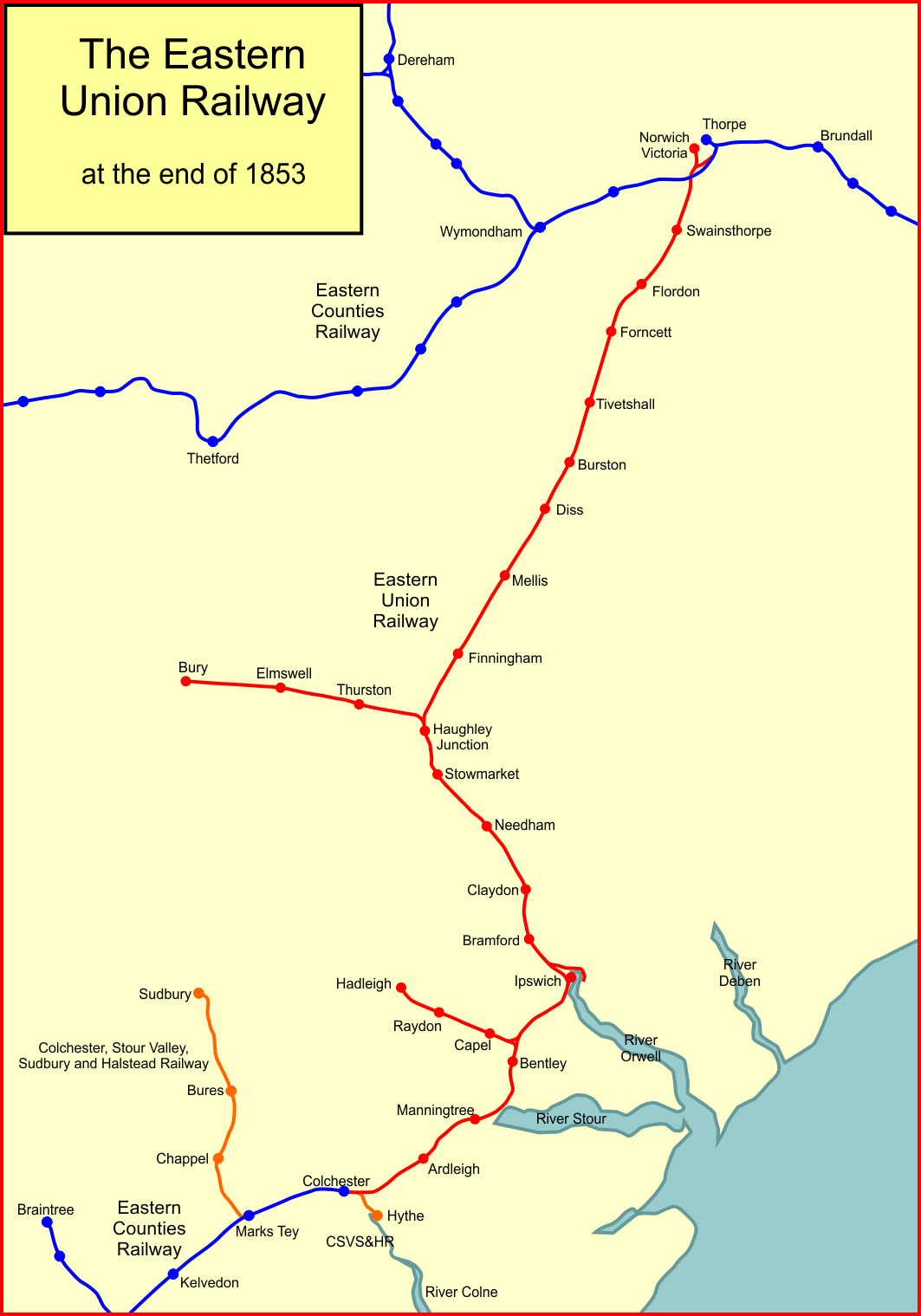
The Eastern Union Railway in 1853

The station was opened in 1849, when the line from London Liverpool Street to Norwich Victoria was constructed; the station was served by Eastern Union Railway stopping services between Norwich and Ipswich.

It was closed in 1966, as a result of the Beeching Axe, along with other smaller stations between Norwich and Ipswich.

Preceding station	Disused railways	Following station
Swainsthorpe	Great Eastern Railway; Great Eastern Main Line	Forncett

== The site today ==
The line through the former station site continues to operate today, hosting electric inter-city services between London Liverpool Street, Ipswich and Norwich.
