= Bentley Church railway station =

Disused railway station in Bentley, Suffolk, England

Bentley Church

General information
- Location: Bentley, Babergh; England
- Coordinates: 52°00′15″N 1°05′29″E

Other information
- Status: Disused

History
- Original company: Eastern Union Railway

Key dates
- 15 Jun 1846: Opened
- Dec 1853: Closed
Location

Bentley Church railway station was located in Suffolk, the village of Bentley. It was situated between the stations of Hadleigh and Manningtree, 1 1/4 miles (2.0 km) northeast of Bentley Station. It opened in 1846 and closed in 1853.

Preceding station	Disused railways	Following station
Capel; Line and station closed	Great Eastern Railway; Eastern Union and Hadleigh Junction Railway	Ipswich Stoke Hill; Line and station closed
Capel; Line and station closed	Great Eastern Railway; Eastern Union and Hadleigh Junction Railway	Bentley; Line and station closed
