= Bramford railway station =

Disused railway station in England

Coordinates: 52.0760°N 1.1048°E

Bramford
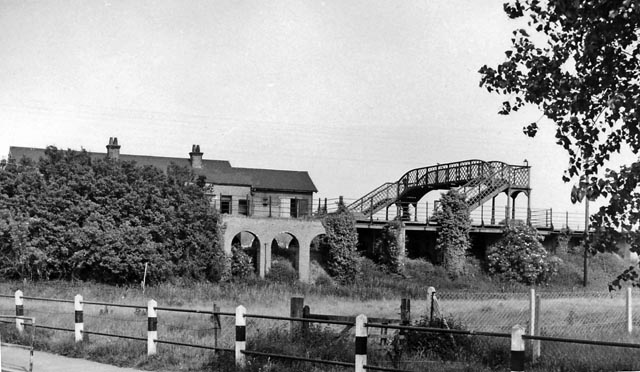
- Bramford station in 1963

General information
- Location: Bramford, District of Mid Suffolk; England
- Platforms: 2

Other information
- Status: Disused

History
- Original company: Ipswich and Bury Railway
- Pre-grouping: Great Eastern Railway
- Post-grouping: London and North Eastern Railway

Key dates
- 24 December 1846: Station opens
- 1913: station resited
- 2 May 1955: Station closed
Location

Bramford railway station refers to the two stations located in Bramford, Suffolk.

== History ==
The first station at Bramford was opened by the Ipswich and Bury Railway on 24 December 1846. It was an all timber affair designed by Frederick Barnes and was situated on an embankment to the north of the Bramford to Ipswich Road. On the down side (from London Liverpool Street) the platform was reached by some steep wooden steps whilst on the up side a slope was the means of access to the platform.

The station was badly damaged by gales in February 1860 with part of the building demolished and strewn across the tracks.

Such were the changes in the railway industry that in 1847 the Ipswich and Bury Railway became part of the Eastern Union Railway which itself became part of the Eastern Counties Railway in 1854. The Great Eastern Railway took over operation of the station in 1862.

At 3:00 p.m. on 1 August 1911 the down platform caught fire and despite the efforts of local railway staff and villagers by 5:30 there was little left of the down side platform. A number of cottages located at the bottom of the embankment were also damaged (the site of a car show room in 2012).

The signal box - a little further to the north - was undamaged as was the goods shed located opposite.

The second Bramford station opened and was located on the other side of the road underbridge. Its construction was approved by the Great Eastern Railway works committee in 1912 and opened in 1913. The station was a substantial brick affair with the station building on the up side and a small shelter on the down side. A new signal box was also provided at this time.

However, in 1919 the goods shed also burnt down (probably due to sparks or ash from a passing train).

The Bradshaws Railway guide for July 1922 shows down services for Bury St Edmunds and Norwich (generally calling all stations) calling at Bramford. Up services generally terminated at Ipswich.

In 1923 the Great Eastern Railway amalgamated with other railway companies to form the London and North Eastern Railway. Two years later the signal box (1912) was abolished being replaced by a new signal box located at Sproughton Sidings some 46 chains closer to Ipswich.

On nationalisation in 1948 the station and its services became part of the Eastern Region of British Railways.

The station was closed with the last train calling on 2 May 1955.

In 1950s the goods yard - in reality a loop off the main line - was handling very little traffic and it lasted until the 1960s. The station was demolished in 1965 and the only remains today are the old track up to the up platform of the original station.

== Fisons Ltd siding ==
A large rail connected chemical works was situated one mile north of Bramford railway station. Opened by Packard and Co in 1851 and situated between the railway and the B1067 (although one siding crossed that road and served a sand quarry). Rail traffic ceased c 1968 with the rails lifted soon after although some inset track remained in the yard in 2013. A narrow gauge railway was situated in the quarry until 1948. (Note: Fisher states this was a sand pit whilst Adderson and Kenworthy state a chalk pit)

This location also had a signal box called "Lime Works" which closed on 26 June 1968 presumably when, or soon after, rail traffic to the sidings ceased.

Preceding station	Historical railways	Following station
Claydon; Line open, station closed	Great Eastern Railway; Main Line	Ipswich; Line and station open
