= Listed buildings in Bentley, Suffolk =

Civil Parish in Suffolk, England

Bentley is a village and civil parish in the Babergh District of Suffolk, England. It contains 14 listed buildings that are recorded in the National Heritage List for England. Of these one is grade I, four are grade II* and nine are grade II.

This list is based on the information retrieved online from Historic England.

== Key ==
Grade	Criteria
I	Buildings that are of exceptional interest
II*	Particularly important buildings of more than special interest
II	Buildings that are of special interest

== Listing ==
Name	Grade	Location	Type	Completed (Note: The date given is the date used by Historic England as significant for the initial building or that of an important part in the structure's description.)	Date designated	Grid ref. (Note: The grid reference is based on the British national grid reference system, sometimes known as OSGB36, used by the Ordnance Survey.) Geo-coordinates	Notes	Entry number (Note: The "List Entry Number" is a unique number assigned to each listed building and scheduled monument by Historic England.)	Image	Wikidata
Bentley Hall	II*	Bentley Hall Lane			22 February 1955	TM1187038395; 52°00′13″N 1°05′07″E		1351964	Upload Photo	Q17534717
Bentley Hall Barn	I	Bentley Hall Road, IP9 2LP	barn		22 February 1955	TM1193738462; 52°00′15″N 1°05′11″E		1351965	Bentley Hall Barn More images	Q17534730
Meeting Hall Stables, Bentley Hall, Approximately 30 Metres South of Bentley Hall	II*	Bentley Hall Road			22 February 1955	TM1187738372; 52°00′12″N 1°05′07″E		1033423	Upload Photo	Q17532655
Pond Hall	II	Bentley Hall Road			2 February 1990	TM1108438773; 52°00′26″N 1°04′27″E		1351966	Upload Photo	Q26635024
Little Dodnash Farmhouse	II	Bergholt Road			30 October 1990	TM1023335843; 51°58′53″N 1°03′36″E		1033425	Upload Photo	Q26284906
Church of St Mary	II*	Church Road	church building		22 February 1955	TM1186038142; 52°00′05″N 1°05′06″E		1193823	Church of St Mary More images	Q17533836
Maltings Cottage	II	Church Road			30 October 1990	TM1277238076; 52°00′01″N 1°05′54″E		1351929	Upload Photo	Q26634993
Maltings Farmhouse	II	Church Road			30 October 1990	TM1277738188; 52°00′05″N 1°05′54″E		1033426	Upload Photo	Q26284907
Maltings House	II	Church Road			30 October 1990	TM1259238175; 52°00′05″N 1°05′44″E		1033427	Upload Photo	Q26284908
Pump in Front of and Approximately 7 Metres East of Maltings House	II	Church Road			30 October 1990	TM1260138182; 52°00′05″N 1°05′45″E		1351930	Upload Photo	Q26634994
Bentley Grove	II	Grove Road			22 February 1955	TM1120736627; 51°59′17″N 1°04′28″E		1033428	Upload Photo	Q26284909
Hubbard's Hall	II	Ipswich Road			22 February 1955	TM1339639061; 52°00′32″N 1°06′29″E		1033424	Upload Photo	Q26284905
Old Hall	II*	Old Hall Lane			30 October 1990	TM1187139700; 52°00′55″N 1°05′10″E		1193864	Upload Photo	Q17533852
Bentley War Memorial	II	Sufffolk, IP9 2BP	war memorial		9 February 2018	TM1133536909; 51°59′25″N 1°04′36″E		1452168	Bentley War Memorial More images	Q66479245

== See also ==
- Grade I listed buildings in Suffolk
- Grade II* listed buildings in Suffolk

== Sources ==
- Bettely, James; Pevsner, Nikolaus (2015) [1961], Suffolk: West, The Buildings of England, New Haven and London: Yale University Press, ISBN 978-0-300-19655-9
