= Edward Chapman (solicitor) =

Edward Chapman was a Victorian-era English solicitor, magistrates' clerk, and municipal official, best known for serving as the long-standing Town Clerk of Harwich, Essex, from 1835 to 1887. A prominent Conservative figure, Chapman held numerous civic and legal roles across northeast Essex, including steward and coroner of the Sokens, clerk to the borough justices, and County Court registrar. He played a central role in the governance of Harwich and its surrounding liberties during a time of significant urban and political transformation.

== Early life and family ==
Edward Chapman was born circa 1813 in Harwich, Essex, the son of Benjamin Chapman (1780–1835), solicitor and Town Clerk of Harwich, and Fanny Chapman (c.1786–1850). Benjamin Chapman was a significant figure in early 19th-century Harwich, acquiring the manorial rights to the Sokens (Walton-le-Soken, Kirby-le-Soken, and Thorpe-le-Soken) and acting as both steward and coroner.

Edward was raised in a household steeped in legal and municipal service and followed his father into the legal profession. He had at least two sisters, Charlotte and Ellen, and remained unmarried throughout his life.

== Career ==
=== Legal practice ===
Edward Chapman entered legal training under his father and was already practising as an attorney of the King's Bench by the mid-1830s. In 1836 he was admitted as a solicitor in Chancery. He inherited and expanded his father's legal practice, operating from his residence and offices at 41 Church Street, Harwich. He became a central figure in the legal life of the town and district.

=== Town Clerk of Harwich ===
Chapman was unanimously elected Town Clerk and Coroner of Harwich in March 1835 following the death of his father. He held the post continuously (with a brief interruption between 1839 and 1843 due to a political dispute) until his resignation in 1887. As Town Clerk, he was also clerk of the peace, clerk of arraigns, legal adviser to the corporation, and later registrar for the Court of Pleas.

In 1839, he was removed from office by a Whig-majority council under the Municipal Corporations Act 1835 but successfully challenged the dismissal in court. In 1841, the Court of Queen's Bench awarded him £30 in compensation, and he was reinstated in 1843.

He remained a key Conservative ally within the town, resisting repeated Liberal attempts to unseat him, most notably in 1855. In 1887, amid renewed political tensions, he resigned his position but retained other legal roles in the town.

=== Civic offices ===
Chapman was known for the wide range of public positions he held, including:

- Registrar of the County Court
- Clerk to the Borough Justices
- Clerk to the Harwich Port Sanitary Authority
- Clerk to the Harwich Burial Board
- Clerk to the Commissioner of Taxes
- Secretary to the Harwich Gas Company
- Vestry Clerk for St. Nicholas' Church, Harwich

Chapman was also involved in major harbour and land-improvement schemes at Harwich. In 1866 he acted as solicitor for the promoters of the Harwich Harbour Estate and Lands Improvement Bill, appearing in parliamentary proceedings concerning the reclamation and acquisition of Crown land. The engineer associated with the scheme was Peter Bruff.

=== Sokens stewardship ===
Edward Chapman succeeded his father as steward and coroner of The Sokens (the manorial jurisdiction covering Walton-le-Soken, Kirby-le-Soken, and Thorpe-le-Soken). He presided over manorial courts and handled complex customary enfranchisements of land during a time when property development was increasing due to the seaside popularity of The Sokens.

Soon after succeeding his father as Coroner of the Sokens, Chapman became involved in a dispute over payment for inquests. In 1838 the Essex Quarter Sessions questioned whether the county was liable for his fees, since the Sokens constituted a historic liberty or franchise. Chapman was required to state a legal case and produce the 1551 grant of Edward VI to Sir Thomas D'Arcy. In January 1839 the Attorney General concluded that the Coroner of the Sokens was lawfully appointed under statute and, because the Soken parishes contributed to the county rate, was entitled to payment of his fees from the county.

His stewardship gave him influence beyond Harwich, particularly in land law, and he remained trustee and lord of the manor until his death. Upon his passing, the manorial rights passed to his relatives and associates, including George William Jones (vicar of Tannington, Suffolk) and Richard Saxty Barnes (his executor and long-time treasurer of the borough).

== Political affiliation ==
Chapman became involved in the controversy surrounding the closely contested Harwich parliamentary election of 1851 between the Conservative candidate Henry Thoby Prinsep and the Whig Robert Wigram Crawford. Following Prinsep's return, a parliamentary election committee undertook a detailed scrutiny of disputed votes in the borough. Twenty-three votes were alleged to be invalid, with objections including non-residence, inadequate occupation of qualifying property and paid electoral agency.

Among the disputed electors was former Harwich MP John Attwood, whose vote was challenged on the ground of non-residence. Evidence before the committee stated that although Attwood had possessed an estate at Dovercourt for more than three years, he had never slept in the house, had kept it unfurnished and had visited Harwich only twice during that period. His gardener, Joseph Smith, also admitted that shortly before the election he had arranged to rent a lodge and small garden from Attwood, prompting counsel to joke that he had been "transplanted" in order to acquire a vote. The committee subsequently declared Attwood's vote invalid.

Chapman's own vote was also challenged. The objection alleged "paid agency", on the basis that Chapman had received election fees in his official capacity as town clerk. The committee rejected the objection and ruled Chapman's vote valid. The inquiry took place against a wider background of disputed and allegedly corrupt elections at Harwich. Attwood's election in 1847 had previously been declared void after a parliamentary committee found that bribery had been committed by his agents.

Prinsep nevertheless ultimately lost his seat, not because the committee established bribery against him, but because he failed to satisfy the property qualification then required of Members of Parliament. A further election was held in May 1851, at which Crawford defeated Prinsep. Crawford's election was itself subsequently declared void after the poll at Harwich was closed prematurely, and the writ for the borough was suspended while Parliament considered further investigation of its electoral practices.

Chapman was an ardent Conservative, closely aligned with figures such as J. H. Vaux and Dr. Evans. He played an unofficial but influential role in candidate selection, including the 1880 Conservative candidacy of Sir Henry Tyler. Chapman appeared as a witness in the 1880 Harwich Election Petition, in which the Liberals alleged bribery and treating by Conservative agents. Though not found guilty, the trial exposed the partisan nature of local politics.

== Personal life ==
Chapman lived for most of his life at 41 Church Street, Harwich, a combined residence and legal office. He lived with his sister Charlotte and, later, two long-serving domestic servants, Caroline and Anne Southgate.

Edward Chapman never married. He is remembered as a stern but respected figure, whose life was rooted in public service and the law.

== Death ==
Chapman died suddenly on 5 January 1894, aged 80, at his home in Church Street. He had retired to bed in apparent good health the night before but was found unconscious the following morning.

His funeral was held on 11 January 1894 and attended by many Harwich dignitaries, townsfolk, and former clerks. He was buried in the Dovercourt Cemetery. His long-serving servant Caroline Southgate continued to live in Dovercourt until her death in 1916.

== Legacy ==
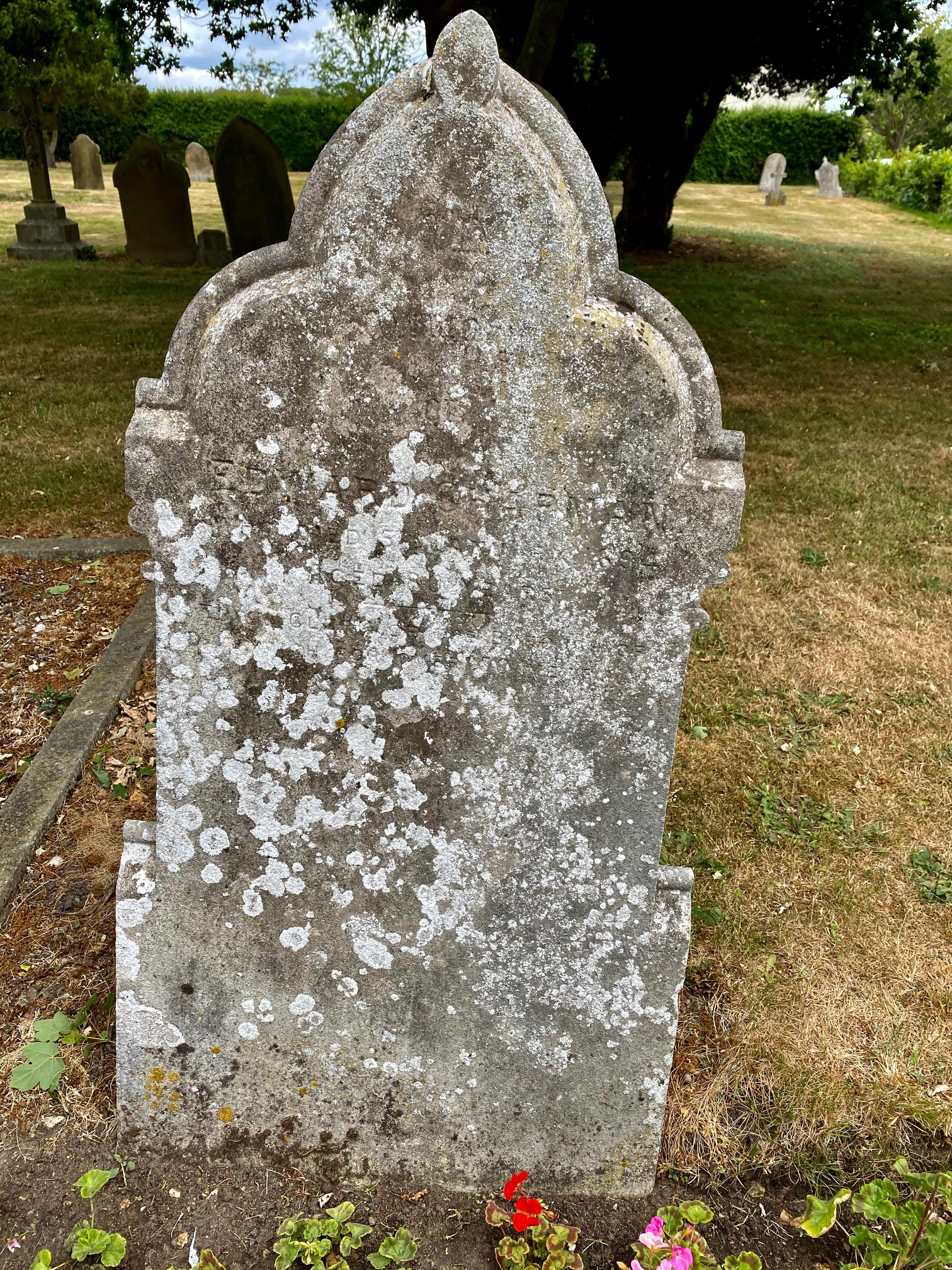
Tombstone of Edward Chapman at Dovercourt Cemetery, erected by public subscription

A tombstone was erected on his grave in 1907 following a public subscription. In later years, his former residence and office were listed for sale as a prime location for a new solicitor. Chapman's work left a lasting imprint on Harwich's legal and civic fabric during the Victorian era.

== Sources ==
- Essex County Chronicle (various issues 1835–1894)
- Victoria County History of Essex, Volume XIII: Harwich and Dovercourt
- UK Parliamentary Papers, 1880 election petition
- Bury Free Press (1880)
- Census Records (1841–1901)
- Probate and Manorial Records (1835–1901)
