= Swainsthorpe railway station =

Former railway station in England

Coordinates: 52.5627°N 1.2706°E

Swainsthorpe
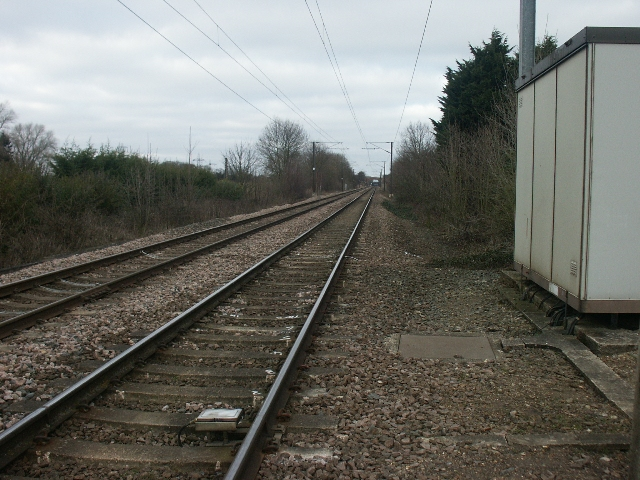
- Station site in 2006

General information
- Location: Swainsthorpe, South Norfolk; England
- Grid reference: TG217011
- Platforms: 2

Other information
- Status: Disused

History
- Pre-grouping: Eastern Union Railway; Great Eastern Railway
- Post-grouping: London and North Eastern Railway; Eastern Region of British Railways

Key dates
- March 1850: Opened
- 5 July 1954: Closed to passengers
- 13 July 1964: Closed to freight
Location

Swainsthorpe was a railway station in Swainsthorpe, Norfolk, England, around five miles south of Norwich. It was opened in 1850 when the Great Eastern Railway constructed the line between London and Norwich. It was the first station south of the terminus at Norwich Victoria. It was well served; in 1889 there were eight trains each way on weekdays. Journey time into Norwich was approximately nine minutes.

The station closed in 1954 as the relatively small population of Swainsthorpe meant it was considered surplus to requirements. Trains now run nonstop between Norwich and Diss.

== Former services ==
Preceding station	Disused railways	Following station
Trowse	Great Eastern Railway; Great Eastern Main Line	Flordon
Norwich Victoria	Great Eastern Railway; Norwich Branch 1849-1914	Flordon
