= Norwich Victoria railway station =

Former railway station in Norfolk, England

Norwich Victoria
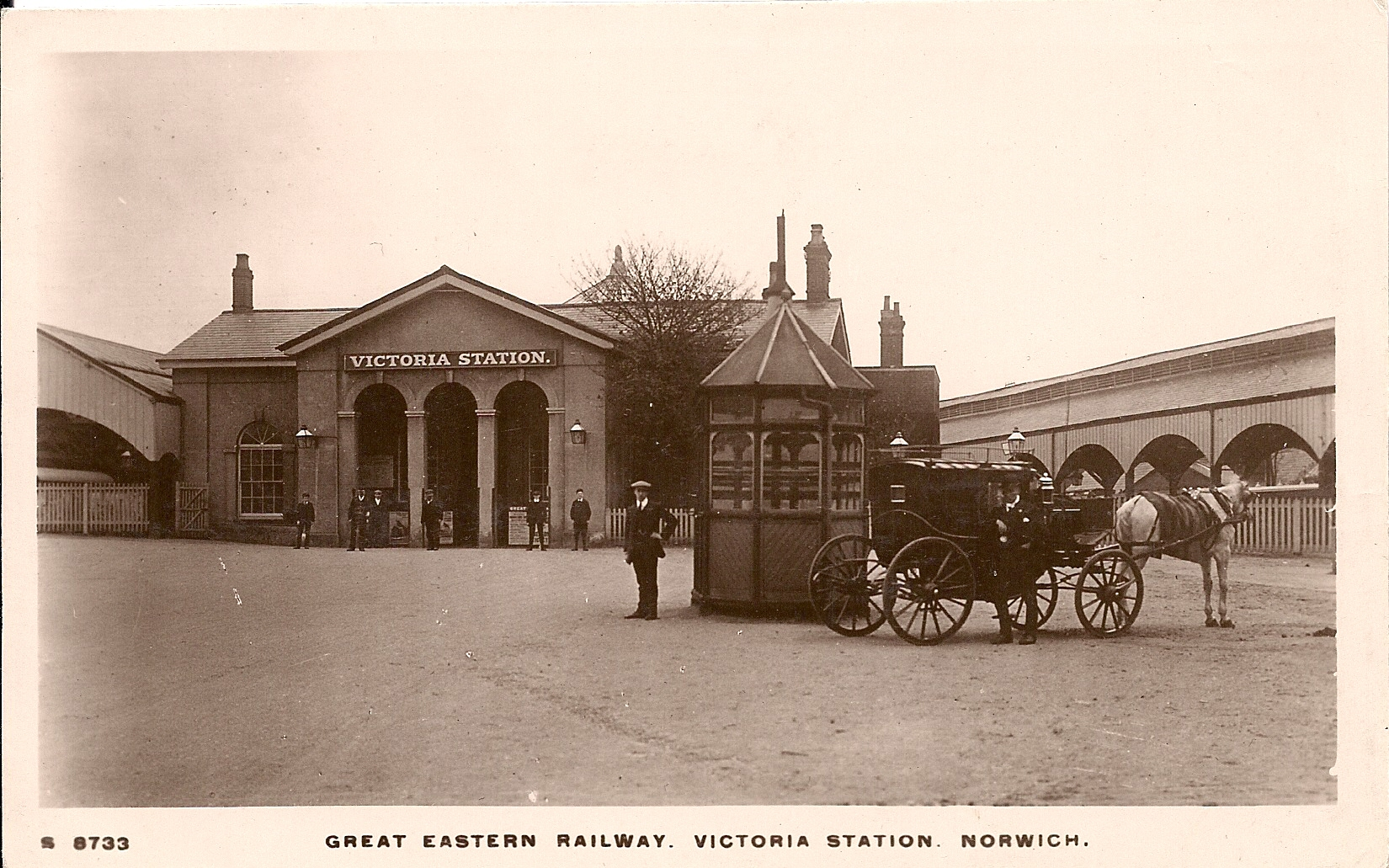

General information
- Location: City of Norwich; England
- Coordinates: 52.6232°N 1.2911°E
- Grid reference: TG227080
- Platforms: 2

Other information
- Status: Disused

History
- Pre-grouping: Eastern Union Railway, Eastern Counties Railway, Great Eastern Railway
- Post-grouping: London and North Eastern Railway, Eastern Region of British Railways

Key dates
- 12 December 1849: Opened
- 22 May 1916: Closed to passengers
- 31 January 1966: Closed to goods
- September 1986: Coal concentration depot and branch closed
Location

Norwich Victoria was a railway station in Norwich, Norfolk, England, and the former terminus of the Great Eastern Main Line. It was one of three stations in the city; the others were Norwich City and Norwich Thorpe; only the latter remains in operation.

== Opening ==
The station was opened by the Eastern Union Railway (EUR), with regular passenger services commencing on 12 December 1849. The booking hall of the station had once housed a circus which formed an entertainment centre known as Ranelagh Gardens. The circus on the site had been operated by a Spanish-sounding gentleman named Pablo Fanque; in reality, it was a Mr Darby from Norwich. When the EUR purchased the site, it then sold several circus fittings.

== Description ==
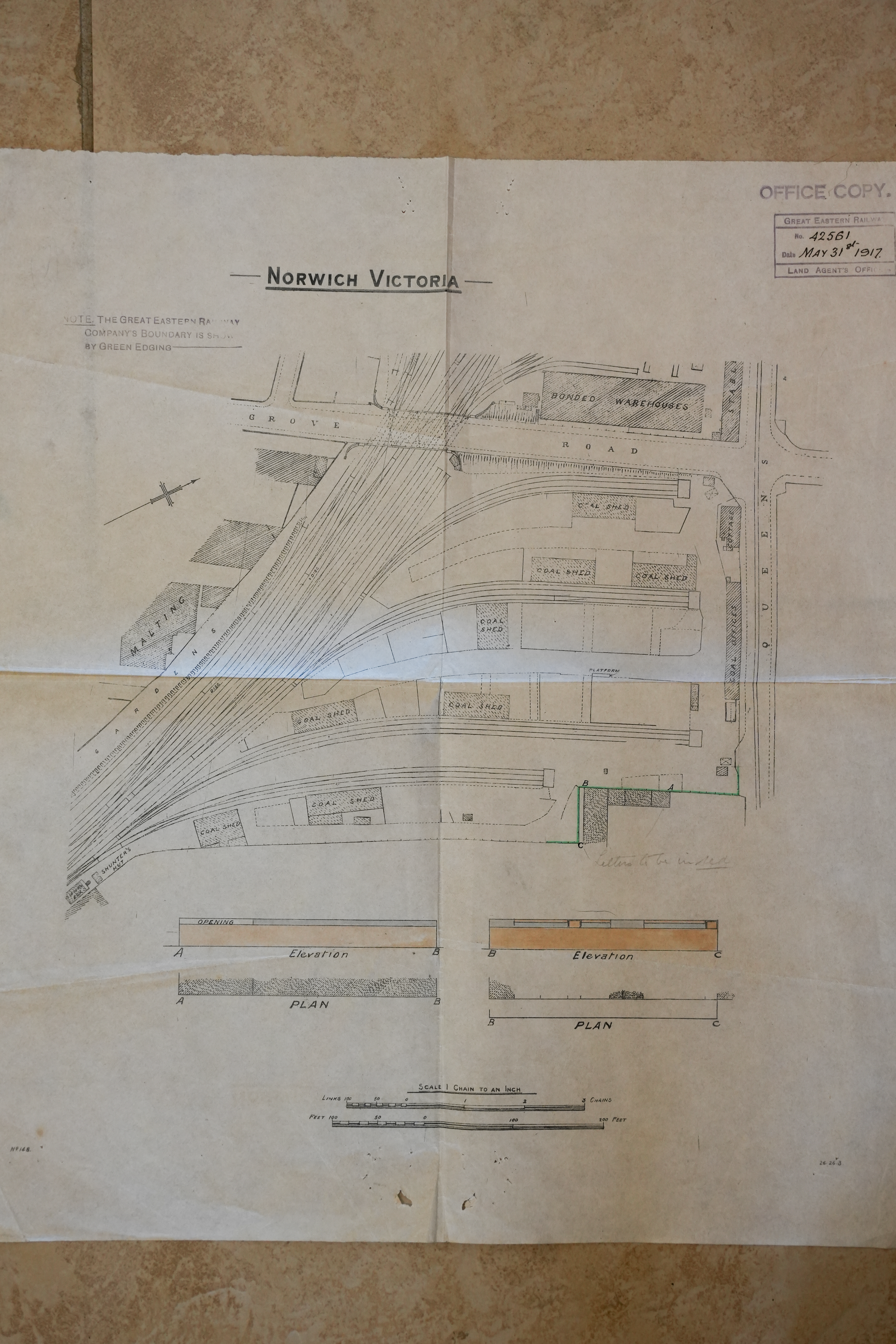
A site plan of the station (1917)

The station had two platforms arranged in a V-shape, with the V at the south end and the rotunda (or pantheon) containing the ticket office at the north end. A small garden was located between the two platforms. According to the 1914 Ordnance Survey plan of the site, there was a two-road engine shed, which measured 136 by 40 feet, and a turntable to the west of the station; there were goods facilities to the east.

== Operations ==
The station was in a poor location and passengers wishing to continue a journey beyond Norwich had to transfer to Thorpe station. On 8 September 1851, a link opened from the EUR line to Ely and most Ipswich services were diverted to Thorpe station, with Victoria only being served by four or five trains each day.

The EUR was taken over by the Eastern Counties Railway (ECR) in 1854; however, by the 1860s, the railways in East Anglia were in financial trouble and most were leased to the ECR. It wished to amalgamate formally but could not obtain government agreement for this until 1862, when the Great Eastern Railway (GER) was formed by the amalgamation. As a result, Thorpe and Victoria became GER stations in 1862.

Preceding station	Disused railways	Following station
Terminus	Great Eastern Railway; Norwich branch	Swainsthorpe; Station closed

== Closure ==
The station closed to passenger traffic in 1916 but remained open as a goods depot, with coal being handled in the adjacent yard.

The engine shed and turntable had been removed by 1926.

The station buildings were largely demolished after the Second World War and were finally removed in February 1953.

== Goods traffic ==
Victoria played a significant role in handling goods traffic in the city. The table below shows the tonnages handled by the four Norwich stations in a 12-week period ending in October 1958:

	City	Victoria	Thorpe	Trowse
Merchandise	2,423	6,439	16,409	2,673
Minerals	2,933	2,167	3,555	340
Coal and coke	20,061	14,649	656	1,548
Total tonnage	25,417	23,255	20,620	4,561

The station closed to goods in 1966; at that time the adjacent coal yard was modernised, becoming a coal concentration depot. Traffic was generally worked by Class 03 or Class 08 shunters from Thorpe station until closure of the line in September 1986.

== The site today ==
The coal depot site is now occupied by a Sainsbury's store and the main station site is occupied by the Norwich offices of Marsh LLC.

The trackbed has been converted into a shared-use path, known as Lakenham Way, for use by pedestrians, runners and cyclists.

== See also ==
- Norwich Thorpe railway station
- Norwich City railway station
