= Bentley railway station (Suffolk) =

Disused railway station in Bentley, Suffolk

Coordinates: 51.98929°N 1.08436°E

Bentley
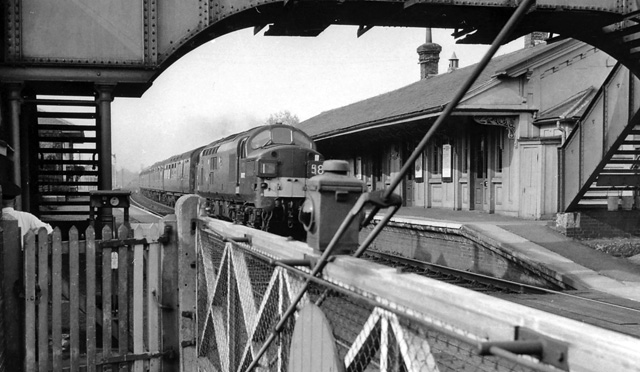

General information
- Location: Bentley, Babergh; England
- Grid reference: TM119368
- Platforms: 3

Other information
- Status: Disused

History
- Original company: Eastern Union Railway
- Pre-grouping: Great Eastern Railway
- Post-grouping: London and North Eastern Railway

Key dates
- 15 June 1846: Opened
- 7 November 1966: Closed
Location

Bentley railway station, also known as Bentley Junction between 1849 and 1878, was located in Bentley, Suffolk on the Great Eastern Main Line. It opened in 1846 and became a junction in 1847 when the Hadleigh Railway opened. The station was closed in 1966.

== Description ==
When built the station was 1/2 mile (0.80 km) from the village itself although a few buildings, including a pub called the Railway Tavern (opened c1850 closed 1970), grew up around it.

The station building was of wooden construction and shared a roof with the goods shed. It was located on the up side of the line and a small waiting room was provided on the downside.

The station had two through mainline platforms and an end bay at the country end of the downside platform to handle services on the Hadleigh branch. North of the station there were three tracks for about 1/2 mile (0.80 km) as far as the junction where the branch to Hadleigh diverged. The bay platform could accommodate five coaches.

When built the junction was a triangular junction with access from both the Ipswich and Bentley directions towards Hadleigh. The Ipswich spur was lifted in the 1870s.

There were goods sidings on both the up and down sides of the station at the country or northern end and also sidings to a malthouse at the southern end of the station on the down side.

The original signal box (which was named Hadleigh Junction) was located on the down (west) side of the line immediately north of the station.

== History ==
=== Opening of the Eastern Union Railway ===
Construction of the line from Ipswich Stoke Hill railway station to Colchester commenced on 1 October 1844 near Bentley; plant and materials had already been landed at Cattawade on the River Stour. The main contractor was Thomas Brassey who sub-let parcels of work to sub-contractors.

By May 1845 the earthworks were complete between Ipswich and Ardleigh, and the timber viaducts across the Stour were completed in December, although the embankments each side were not completed until May 1846. The directors were then able to traverse the line by special train on 2 May 1846. It ran from Ipswich to Colchester, taking an hour and a half to complete the journey.

Revenue earning goods services commenced on 1 June 1846 and three days later on 4 June Major General Pasley visited the line to carry out the Board of Trade inspection which was needed to start passenger operations. Pasley was satisfied and a ceremonial opening took place on 11 June 1846.

The line opened for public passenger service on 15 June 1846 from an end-on junction with the Eastern Counties Railway at its Colchester station to a terminus at Ipswich Stoke Hill.

=== Early years ===
The Hadleigh branch was proposed by the Eastern Union and Hadleigh Junction Railway was incorporated by Act of 18 June 1846. Hadleigh had been by-passed by the Eastern Union line and the EU&HJR was formed to build a 7 1/2-mile (12.1 km) long single track branch line between there and Bentley. Both railways saw that amalgamating would be useful and parliament authorised this on 8 June 1847. A short time later on 20 August 1847 the branch opened.

The station was renamed Bentley Junction in 1849.

Although the EUR expanded its network to Bury St Edmunds and Norwich it was effectively hemmed in geographically but the Eastern Counties Railway who had acquired many of the other East Anglian Railways had become increasingly dominant. By late 1853 negotiations were taking place between the EUR and ECR and on 19 December 1853 it was agreed the ECR was to take over the working of the EUR network from 1 January 1854. Although the EUR remained an independent company it was the end of the EUR as an operating railway and Bentley became an Eastern Counties Railway station.

By the 1860s the railways in East Anglia were in financial trouble, and most were leased to the ECR; they wished to amalgamate formally, but could not obtain government agreement for this until 1862, when the Great Eastern Railway (GER) was formed by amalgamation. Thus Bentley became a GER station in 1862.

=== Great Eastern Railway (1862-1922) ===
The northern spur from the Hadleigh line towards Ipswich was taken out of use in 1875 meaning any trains from Ipswich to Hadleigh had to reverse at Bentley. By this time most trains on the Hadleigh branch worked from Bentley connecting in and out of main line trains.

In 1879 the station was renamed from Bentley Junction to Bentley. The station nameboards were supplemented with "change here for the Hadleigh branch".

The platforms were extended c1892/3 and in 1894 a replacement footbridge (which had formerly been at Parkeston) was sited to the south end of the platforms, adjacent to the level crossing. An up refuge siding was added north of the station in 1897 The purpose of this was to allow low speed goods trains to recess off the main line to allow faster services to pass.

On 21 May 1901 a mixed passenger train hit the buffer stops in the bay platform slightly injuring five passengers.

In 1913 a 700 feet (210 m) refuge siding was installed on the down side south of the station. At the same time the original signal box was replaced by a new structure known as Bentley Junction and it carried this name through to its closure.

In 1922 the siding to the Malthouse south of the station was lifted and the Malthouse was subsequently demolished.

=== London & North Eastern Railway (1923-1947) ===
Following the grouping act of 1921 the GER became part of the London & North Eastern Railway (LNER).

Passenger numbers had been falling on the Hadleigh branch for a number of years and on 27 February 1932 the last passenger train was run with official closure to passengers being 29 February 1932. The line remained open for goods traffic and during World War II saw extensive traffic in connection with RAF Raydon.

=== British Railways (1948-1966) ===
Following nationalisation of the railways on 1 January 1948 Bentley became a British Railways Eastern Region station. Goods facilities were withdrawn on 13 June 1964 and the Hadleigh branch closed to freight on 16 April 1965. The sidings were lifted soon after.

Passenger services were withdrawn on 7 November 1966 and the station was closed.

=== After closure ===
An accident occurred on 31 July 1971 when a tanker train ran into the back of a coal train. The train crew suffered minor injuries only.

The mechanical signal box survived until 29 June 1975 but was closed after the semaphore signals were converted to remotely controlled (by Colchester) colour light signals. Around the same time a locally based re-opening campaign had been campaigning for the re-opening of the station.

The last station buildings were cleared in 1984.

Electrification followed in the 1980s with the first Ipswich to London electric services operating on 1 May 1985.

In 2021 the site of the station is still clearly identifiable at the Station Road level crossing, and the former crossing keepers house adjacent to the level crossing is in use as a private residence as is the former Railway Tavern.

== Services ==
in the March 1850 Bradshaw's Guide five out of six weekday trains between Ipswich and Colchester called at Bentley in both the up and down directions. There were three trains on Sundays. On weekdays three services from Hadleigh to Bentley are shown with four in the opposite direction. In the notes it suggest there is an additional train from Hadleigh which uses the north curve directly to Ipswich for a connection to Norwich.

In July 1922 Bradshaw's Guide, the last year the GER operated the service, between Monday and Saturday in the up direction there were seven weekday services (plus an additional train calling on Tuesday most of which started at Ipswich with others starting from Norwich and Bury St. Edmunds. As well as Colchester and Liverpool Street there was a direct service to Harwich and another to Marks Tey. On Sundays there four services in the up direction.

The station was served by nine main line services in the down direction including a number that started from London Liverpool Street. On Sunday there were five down trains.

The Hadleigh branch had five services in each direction between Monday and Saturday but no Sunday service.

In the British Rail Eastern Region timetable of June 1964, two years before closure, the station was served by four trains per day, Monday to Saturday. In the up direction the 6:40 a.m. Ipswich to Colchester called at 6:49 and in the evening the 5:50 p.m. Ipswich to Colchester called at 5:59. In the down direction the 7:20 a.m. Colchester to Ipswich called at 7:39 and the 6:30 p.m. Colchester to Ipswich called at 6.49. It is likely these were all worked by the same DMU on most days. There was no Sunday service.

== The railway farm ==
During 1916 the Great Eastern Railway ran a poultry demonstration trains throughout East Anglia often visiting towns on market day. The purpose of this train was to encourage self-sufficiency during the food shortages of the First World War. Encouraged by the reception this train got, the GER purchased Dodnash Priory Farm in Bentley, Suffolk as a poultry demonstration farm. The hen houses were built at Stratford Works and had individual works numbers. By 1920 the farm was producing 40,000 eggs per month for the GER as well as chickens, turkeys, fruit and vegetables for the GER hotels, restaurants, dining cars and buffets.

Dodnash Priory also served as a rest home for GER horses. A siding about 3/4 mile (1.2 km) south of Bentley railway station on the down side served the farm.

The farm survived into LNER days being sold in 1927 when the farmer reached 70 and retired. The siding had been removed in May 1925.

Preceding station	Historical railways	Following station
Manningtree; Line and station open	Great Eastern Railway; Eastern Union Railway	Ipswich; Line and station open
	Disused railways	
Terminus	Great Eastern Railway; Eastern Union and Hadleigh Junction Railway	Bentley Church; Line and station closed
