= Bentley, Suffolk =

Village in Suffolk, England

Coordinates: 51.991°N 1.069°E

Bentley
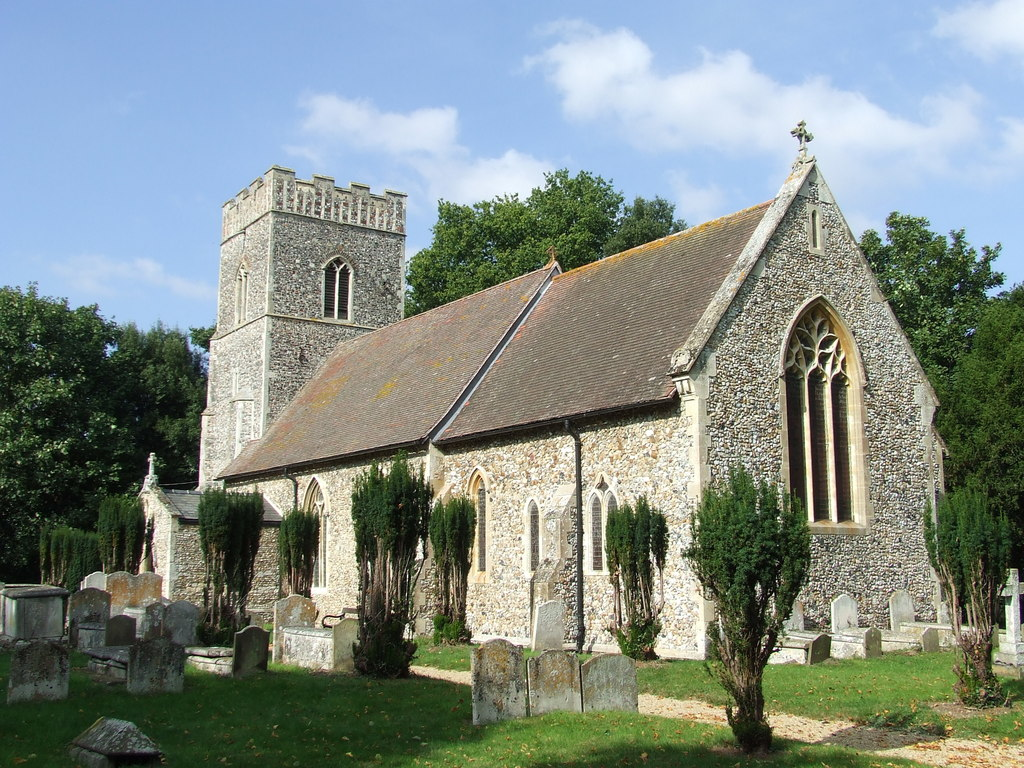
- St Mary's parish church

- Location within Suffolk
- Interactive map of Bentley
- Area: 10.89 km^{2} (4.20 sq mi)
- Population: 776 (2011 Census)
  - Density: 71/km^{2} (180/sq mi)
- OS grid reference: TM1136
- Civil parish: Bentley
- District: Babergh
- Shire county: Suffolk
- Region: East
- Country: England
- Sovereign state: United Kingdom
- Post town: Ipswich
- Postcode district: IP9
- Dialling code: 01473
- Police: Suffolk
- Fire: Suffolk
- Ambulance: East of England
- Website: Bentley Village in Suffolk

Bentley is a village and civil parish in the Babergh district of Suffolk, England, about 6 miles (10 km) southwest of Ipswich. The 2011 Census recorded the parish's population as 776.

Bentley has a Church of England parish church, a Reformed Baptist church, a Church of England primary school, a pub, a Village Hall and a riding school. A community owned village shop opened in the summer of 2016.

Bentley has a parish council. It also had a forum called Bentley Free Speech that commented on matters relating to the parish council and other village issues. There was also an alternative news site called Bentley News, which was managed by a local resident.

The Eastern Union Railway was built through the parish and opened on 15 July 1846. Bentley railway station was about 1/2 mile (800 m) east of the village, and served the area until British Railways closed it in 1966. The station was a junction between 1847 and 1965 for the Hadleigh branch line. The branch line also had a short-lived station called Bentley Church (1847-1853).

The main line railway is now (2016) known as the Great Eastern Main Line.

== See also ==
- Listed buildings in Bentley, Suffolk
