= Ipswich TMD =

Railway maintenance depot in Ipswich, Suffolk

Coordinates: 52.0501°N 1.144°E

Location
- Location: Ipswich, Suffolk

Characteristics
- Owner: Greater Anglia
- Depot code: IP (1973 -)
- Type: DMU, EMU

History
- Former depot code: 32B (1948 - May 1968) S.P (May 1968 - May 1973)

Ipswich TMD is a traction maintenance depot located in Ipswich, Suffolk, England. The depot is situated on the Great Eastern Main Line and is near Ipswich station.

The depot code is IP.

== Allocation ==
As of 2016, the depot's allocation consists of Greater Anglia Class 321 EMUs.

== See also ==
- Ipswich engine shed
