= Peter Bruff =

English civil engineer (1812–1900)

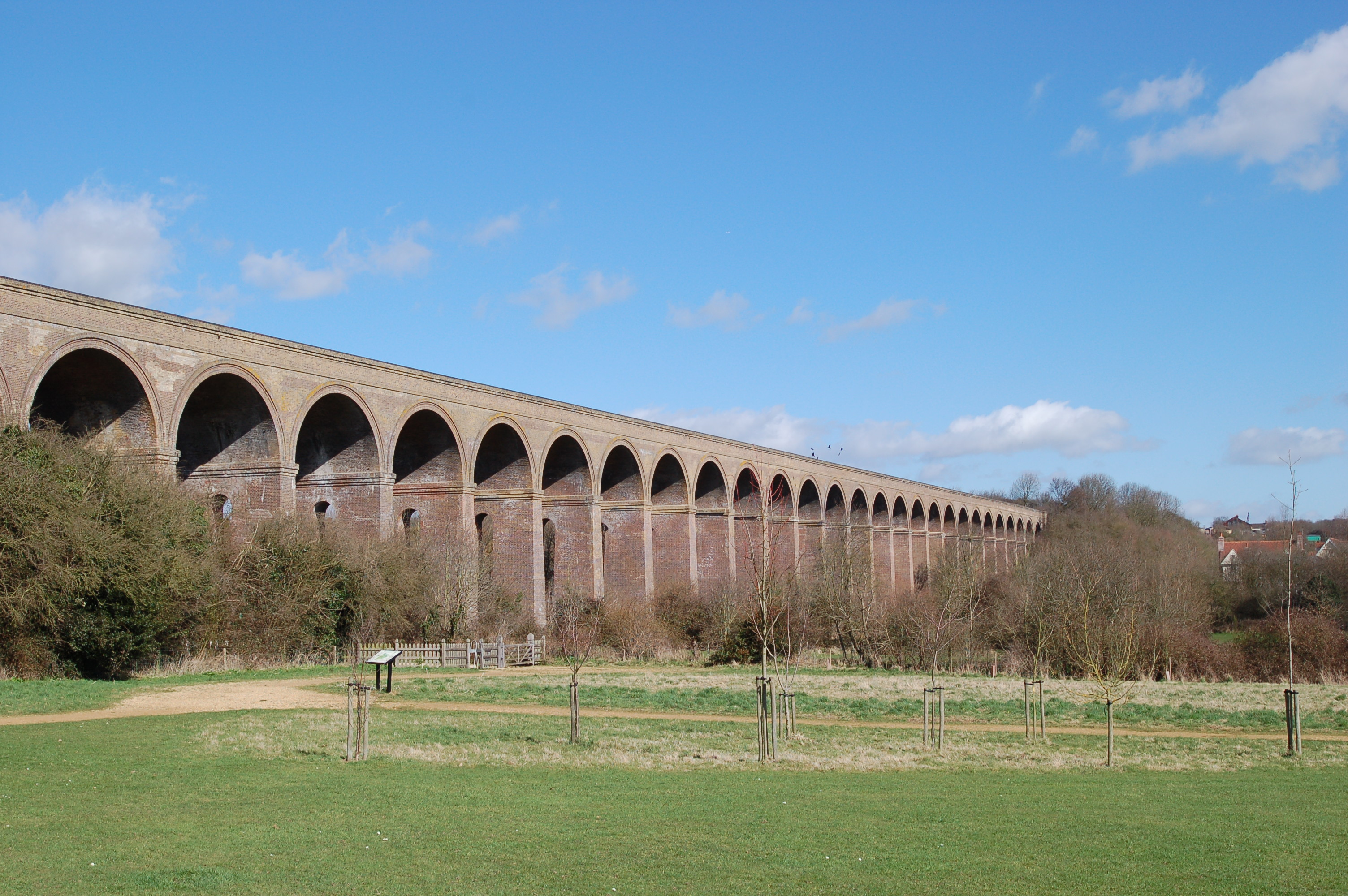
View of the Chappel Viaduct on the Sudbury line, engineered by Peter Bruff in 1847-1849

Peter Schuyler Bruff (23 July 1812 – 24 February 1900) was an English civil engineer and land developer remembered primarily for his part in establishing the East Anglian railway networks between the 1840s and 1860s. His contribution to the region's infrastructure and development extended far beyond the railways, however, and included the renovation of the Colchester water supply (1851-1880) and the Ipswich sewerage system (completed 1881), the development of the town of Harwich and the Essex resorts of Walton-on-the-Naze and Clacton on Sea (which he built up from an empty piece of farmland into a flourishing seaside town), and (not least) the late Victorian revival of the Coalport porcelain factory in Shropshire, which he purchased in 1880.

== Early career ==
Bruff was born in Plymouth Dock. He published his Treatise on Engineering Field-Work, Containing Practical Land-Surveying for Railways, &c. in 1838, with an enlarged edition in 1840 and a second part in 1842. He was elected an Associate of the Institution of Civil Engineers on 19 May 1840.

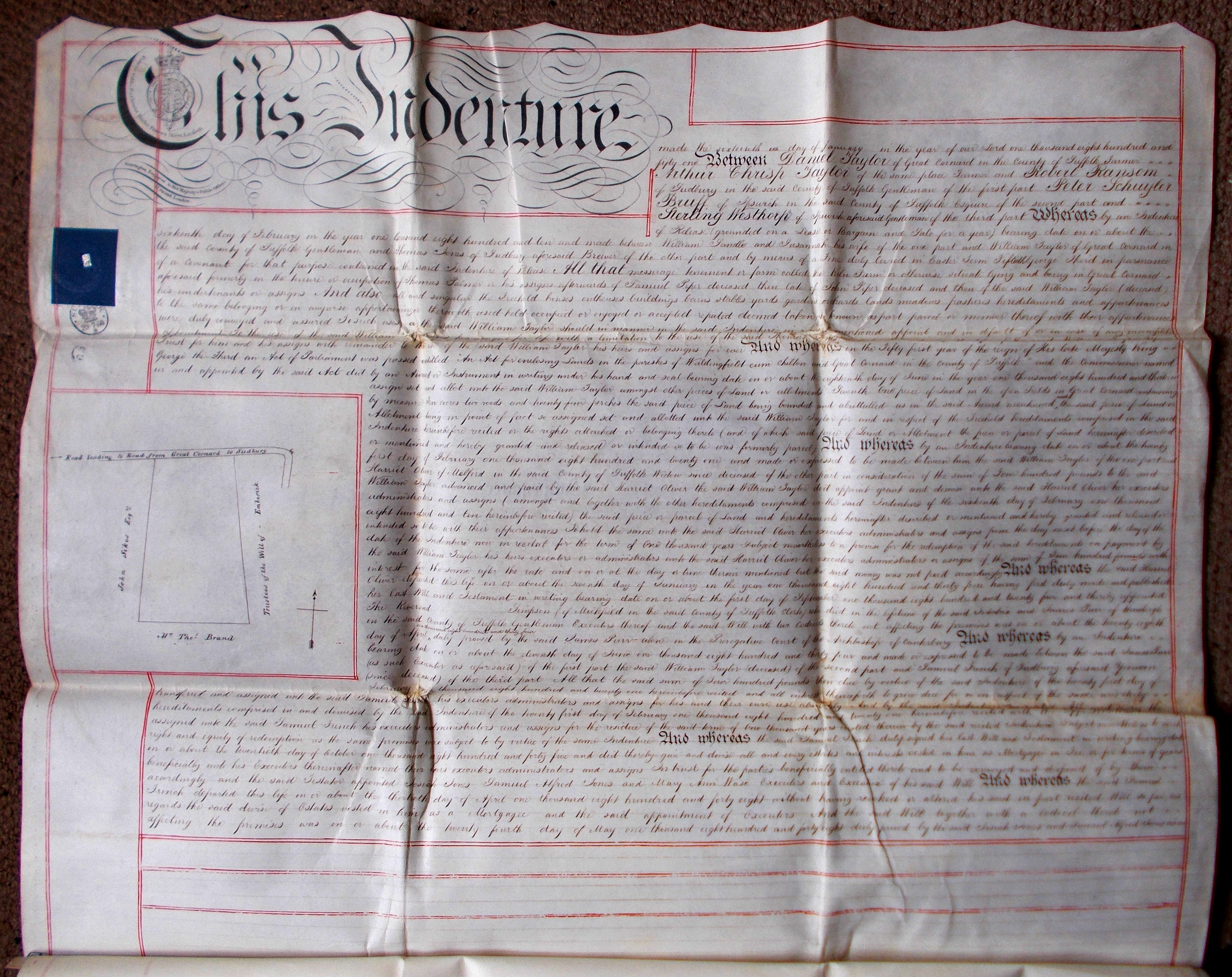
Deed of purchase by Peter Bruff of land at Great Cornard, Sudbury, 1851

Bruff worked on the Eastern Counties Railway from Shoreditch to Colchester, which was constructed between 1837 and 1843, but was discharged from the Company in 1842 owing to disagreements with the chief engineer John Braithwaite. Braithwaite's proposals for the line from Colchester to Ipswich involved very costly earthworks and construction. Bruff saw the opportunity for a more competitive and achievable project, and with the support of John Chevallier Cobbold of Ipswich, a director of the ECR, this was constructed between October 1844 and May 1846 with Joseph Locke as consulting engineer and Bruff as resident engineer, in the company name of the Eastern Union Railway.

In 1845-6 the line was extended through Bruff's 361 yd (330 m) Stoke Tunnel as the route was developed toward Bury St Edmunds. Ipswich railway station, originally sited at the southern end of the tunnel, was relocated to its present site nearer the town centre in 1860. The original station site became the good yard, and when this site was redeveloped for housing the new streets included a 'Bruff Road'. The line to Bury was constructed under the auspices of the Ipswich and Bury Railway Company.

Between 1847 and 1849 Bruff engineered the Chappel Viaduct, which carries the Sudbury Branch Line across the Colne Valley in Essex. It stands 80 feet (24 m) above the river, has 32 arches and is 1,066 feet (325 m) long. The viaduct contains 4.5 million bricks.

In 1852 he applied for a patent, No. 14,096, for "Improvements in the construction of the permanent way of rail, tram, or other roads, and in the rolling stock or apparatus used therefor".

== Colchester water supply ==
In 1851 Bruff, in partnership with William Hawkins, bought the Colchester Waterworks Company as an investment, as awareness of the relationship between water supply and public health increased. He sank an artesian well on the site of the old waterworks in 1852, which soon doubled the supply on the west side of Colchester, but in 1858 the east side, which had the densest population, still had no adequate supply. Two years later he discovered a good spring near Sheepen Farm and brought water from that to Balkerne Hill, but this remained insufficient. In 1880 the Colchester Corporation purchased the private waterworks and closed the Sheepen Farm source: the Jumbo Water Tower was constructed soon afterwards (designed by Charles Clegg, the Borough Engineer).

== Walton-on-the-Naze ==
While working on the Ipswich line in 1855 Bruff bought a house, Burnt House Farm, in Walton-on-the-Naze, a village north of Frinton, Essex, from the steward of the Manor Edward Chapman. He began to work on developing Walton further and to this end, having completed the Ipswich line, built the Tendring Hundred Railway line to Walton in 1867. Peter Bruff's pier at Walton replaced an existing smaller pier which was blown down by a storm in 1881. Bruff was also responsible for the building of the Marine Terrace, South Terrace (destroyed by bombing in World War II) and Clifton Baths (today the Pier Hotel).

== Clacton-on-Sea ==
Bruff developed the resort of Clacton-on-Sea, on a stretch of Essex farmland adjoining low cliffs, near the older villages of Great and Little Clacton. In 1864, Bruff bought 50 acres (200,000 m^{2}), the area now to each side of the Pier and inland as far as Rosemary Road, for around £10,000. Development work began in 1870 and it was officially incorporated as a town in 1872. In 1871 The Times declared (bravely) "...that being an entirely new creation and not the adaptation of an existing town, none of the evils inseparable from the old watering holes will be allowed to exist in it. There will be no slums, nor any object that can offend the eye." The opening of the pier and subsequent pleasure-boat trips from London spurred the development of the town, as did the arrival of the railway - a branch line built by a different company from Thorpe-le-Soken on Bruff's line to Walton - in 1882.

Bruff built (and perhaps designed) the Royal Hotel in 1872, and laid out the town centre, incorporating earlier country lanes and tracks such as Wash Lane. He also built a public hall in Pier Avenue (destroyed by a fire in 1939). A hospital ward and a residential road are named in Bruff's memory.

== Ipswich Sewerage Works ==
In 1880-1881 Bruff, as consulting engineer to the Ipswich Corporation, with his assistant and protege Thomas Miller jr., M.I.C.E., completely renovated the drainage of the town of Ipswich by the construction of a main sewer two and a half miles in length, intercepting the smaller sewers which had for many years emptied their out-flow into the river Orwell at various points. From this, the sewage was discharged into the tidal river at extensive outfall works built about one and a half miles from the town. Storage was provided for up to six million gallons of sewage and storm water, and was arranged so that the outlet was closed at high tide. The cost of the sewer and works was between £50,000 and £60,000. A grand ceremonial dinner was held in the outflow chamber immediately before it was brought into commission in 1881.

== Coalport china works ==
Following the death of William Pugh in 1875, the Coalport china works of John Rose & Co., in Shropshire, were wound up, and the business was purchased by Peter Bruff in 1880. He re-established it as a limited liability company, the Coalport China Company, placing it under the management of his son Charles Clarke Bruff in 1889. After Peter Bruff's death in 1900 Charles became Director, bringing his nephew Arthur Bruff Garrett into the management, and he rebuilt the works on the original site in 1902. Under his vision and energy some of its former glory was revived. During the 1920s it fell again into financial difficulties and was eventually taken over by the Cauldon Potteries, Ltd., of Shelton, Staffordshire, in 1925.

== Conclusion ==
Bruff died at Ipswich on 24 February 1900, and was buried in the old Municipal Cemetery in that town. His widow Harriette D. Bruff was buried there in 1907. His daughter Kate Garrett (who in 1860 married Newson Garrett (junior), son of Newson Garrett of Aldeburgh, and brother of Elizabeth Garrett Anderson and Millicent Garrett Fawcett) was buried in the same cemetery in 1924.
