= British Rail Class D1/1 =

Type and origin
- Power type: Diesel-mechanical
- Builder: Hunslet Engine Company
- Serial number: 4625–4627
- Build date: 1954–1955
- Total produced: 3
Specifications
- Configuration
  - Whyte: 0-4-0DM
  - UIC: B-dm
- Gauge: 4 ft 8 1/2 in (1,435 mm) standard gauge
- Wheel diameter: 3 ft 4 in (1.016 m)
- Minimum curve: 0.91 chains (18.306 m) normal; 0.74 chains (14.886 m) dead slow
- Wheelbase: 5 ft 6 in (1.676 m)
- Length: 20 ft 10 1/2 in (6.363 m)
- Width: 11 ft 0 in (3.353 m)
- Height: 20 ft 10 1/2 in (6.363 m)
- Axle load: 11.25 long tons (11.43 t)
- Loco weight: 22.45 long tons (22.81 t; 25.14 short tons)
- Fuel type: Diesel
- Fuel capacity: 100 imperial gallons (450 L; 120 US gal)
- Prime mover: Gardner 6L3
- RPM
  - Maximum RPM: 1,200 rpm
- Engine type: Four-stroke diesel
- Cylinders: 6
- Transmission: Mechanical, Hunslet patent friction clutch, Hunslet four-speed gearbox
- MU working: Not fitted
- Train heating: None
- Loco brake: Air
- Train brakes: None
Performance figures
- Maximum speed: 14 mph (23 km/h)
- Power output: Engine: 153 bhp (114 kW)
- Tractive effort
  - Continuous: 10,800 lbf (48.0 kN) at 4.5 mph (7.2 km/h)
- Brakeforce: 16 long tons-force (160 kN)
Career
- Operators: British Railways
- Class: DY1; later D1/1; later 1/15. No TOPS class.
- Numbers: 11500–11502; D2950–D2952 from 1957
- Axle load class: Route availability 1
- Locale: North Eastern Region
- Withdrawn: 1966–1967
- Disposition: One sold to industry then scrapped, two scrapped

British Rail Class D1/1 (formerly DY1) was a class of shunting locomotives commissioned by British Rail in England. It was a diesel locomotive in the pre-TOPS period built by the Hunslet Engine Company with a 153 horsepower (114 kW) Gardner 6L3 engine.

== History ==
The design was specifically designed to work dockside tramways and was ordered by the Eastern Region of British Railways to carry out this work. Equipped with a 5 ft 6 in (1.68 m) wheelbase, it could work the tight curves of East Anglian dock systems.

The locomotives were initially allocated to Ipswich Engine Shed and were fitted with cow-catchers for working the dockside tramway lines. As time passed and traffic levels declined at Ipswich, they were transferred away from Ipswich with D2950 being recorded at Great Yarmouth (which had a quayside tramway) and D2951 at Goole which had a dock system. D2950 and D2951 were both transferred from Ipswich to Goole in December 1966.

Withdrawn in 1967 during a purge on non standard shunters, D2951 and D2952 were scrapped in 1968. D2950 survived in industrial use at Llanelli (at Thyssen (Great Britain) Ltd.) and was marked for preservation in 1982, but was ultimately scrapped in 1983.

Table of withdrawals
Year	Quantity in service at start of year	Quantity withdrawn	Locomotive numbers	Notes
1966	3	1	D2952	
1967	2	2	D2950-51	D2950 went into industrial use.

== Models ==
Class D1/1 is being made as a kit and a ready-to-run model in OO gauge by Silver Fox Models.

== See also ==
- List of British Rail classes
