= Frederick Brett Russell =

English architect and artist

Frederick Brett Russell (25 June 1813, Walworth – 1 November 1869, Ipswich) was an English architect and artist based in Ipswich, Suffolk.

Russell was based at a studio in Berners Street, Ipswich.

He is buried in Old Ipswich Cemetery.

== Architectural career ==
Fredrick was apprenticed to Henry William Inwood.

== Artistic career ==
Frederick spelt his surname with one "l" for his artistic works.
