= Eastern Union Railway =

Former English railway company

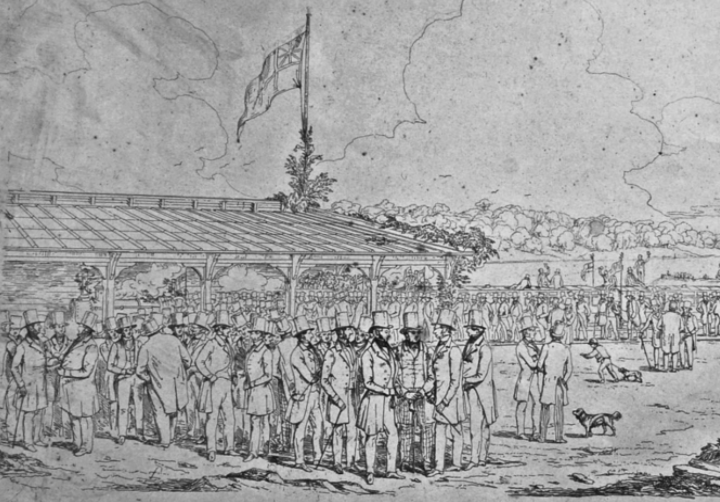
- Opening Ceremony of Ipswich Croft Street Railway Station, 11 June 1846 by Frederick Brett Russell

Overview
- Locale: East Anglia
- Dates of operation: 1846–1856
- Successor: Eastern Counties Railway (1854)

Technical
- Track gauge: 4 ft 8 1/2 in (1,435 mm)

The Eastern Union Railway (EUR) was an English railway company, at first built from Colchester to Ipswich; it opened in 1846. It was proposed when the earlier Eastern Counties Railway failed to make its promised line from Colchester to Norwich. The businessman John Chevallier Cobbold and the engineer Peter Bruff were prominent in launching the company. The allied but nominally independent Ipswich and Bury Railway built a line onwards to Bury St Edmunds, also opening in 1846, and soon amalgamated with the EUR.

Norwich was connected to the EUR in 1849 by the EUR building a line on from Haughley (on the former I&BR) to a terminus at Norwich, named Victoria. By this time the Eastern Counties Railway had reached Norwich via Ely by leasing the Norfolk Railway; the ECR was established at Thorpe station. The EUR also had a branch to Hadleigh, and leased a branch to Sudbury.

The EUR suffered by being dependent on the ECR for through traffic from Colchester to London, and the ECR used many predatory methods to the disadvantage of the EUR, and the latter became subject to serious financial difficulties. It leased its line to the ECR in 1854, and the ECR thereby increased its dominance in East Anglia. The EUR remained an independent company, but not operating any railway, until 1862 when it and the ECR were amalgamated with other networks to form the new Great Eastern Railway.

The main line from Colchester to Norwich remains in use today, except that the Victoria station has closed; the route forms the Great Eastern Main Line. The Sudbury branch is also still in use.

== Early schemes ==
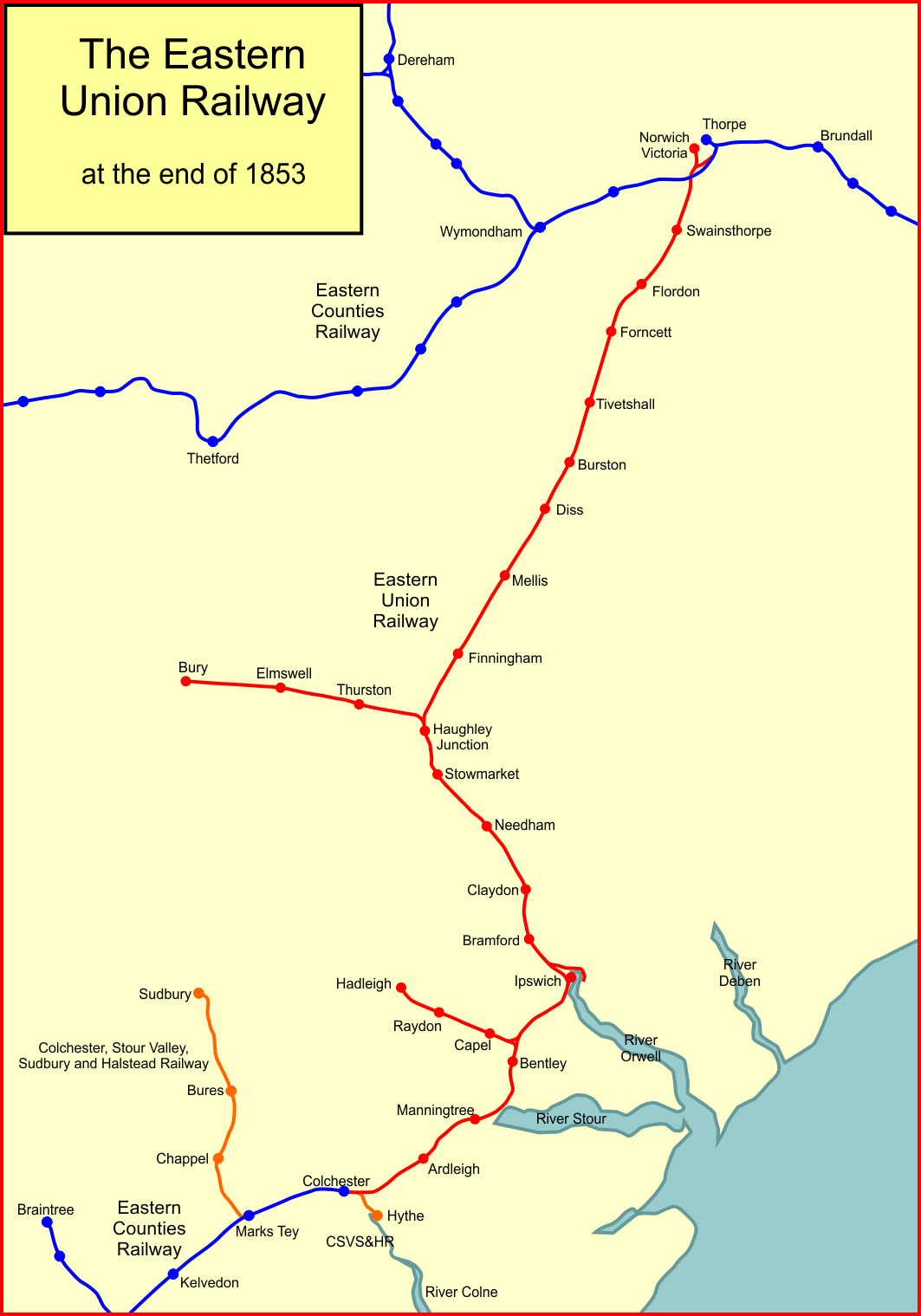
The Eastern Union Railway in 1853

The first railway scheme for East Anglia was proposed in 1825 when a scheme known as the Norfolk and Suffolk Rail-Road was being promoted by John Wilks. This venture failed to attract much interest and was widely believed to be a swindle.

Also in 1825 a scheme was proposed to link the port of Ipswich with market towns in the hinterland; the route was to link Diss and Eye to Ipswich. This scheme too foundered without much further development.

The first authorised railway through Ipswich was the Eastern Counties Railway, which obtained its authorising act of Parliament, the Eastern Counties Railway Act 1836 (6 & 7 Will. 4. c. cvi), on 4 July 1836; it was to be built from London to Yarmouth, a distance of 126 miles. Share capital was £1.2 million. Land acquisition soon proved to be hugely more expensive than had been expected; the first portion of line, from Romford to Mile End, opened on 20 June 1839, but the project ran out of money. It was cut back to open only between London and Colchester, on 29 March 1843; surveying for the onward route as far as Ardleigh, less than 3 miles away, had been completed.

== The Eastern Union Railway conceived ==
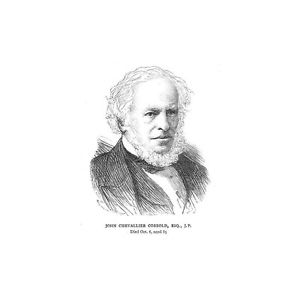
John Chevallier Cobbold: brewer and railway pioneer

Peter Bruff had been working as an engineer on the construction of the Eastern Counties Railway. It appears that there was friction between him and the company's chief engineer, John Braithwaite. Braithwaite had designed the Eastern Counties Railway with magnificent, but very costly, viaducts and earthworks. Braithwaite estimated that £800,000 was needed to extend the line from Colchester to Ipswich. Bruff believed that a cheaper scheme was more practicable. Bruff was discharged from the service of the Eastern Counties Railway in 1842, but he maintained contact with John Chevallier Cobbold, a director of that company. Cobbold became the driving force in promoting a new railway to connect Ipswich and Colchester, and at a public meeting in Ipswich on 8 August 1843 Bruff explained his scheme. The line would be called the Eastern Union Railway, and would be much more cheaply built than the Eastern Counties Railway's proposed line. With the impetus of Cobbold's support and Bruff's engineering competence, it was shown to be practicable and affordable to extend to Ipswich.

Eastern Union Railway Act 1844
- Act of Parliament
- Parliament of the United Kingdom
- Long title: An Act for making a Railway from Colchester to Ipswich.
- Citation: 7 & 8 Vict. c. lxxxv

Dates
- Royal assent: 19 July 1844

Other legislation
- Repealed by: Great Eastern Railway Act 1862

Status: Repealed

Text of statute as originally enacted

The meeting determined that the scheme was to be supported, and parliamentary authorisation was sought in the 1844 session; the bill received royal assent as the Eastern Union Railway Act 1844 (7 & 8 Vict. c. lxxxv) on 19 July 1844. The authorised capital was £200,000. The project was for a single line railway, but earthworks for a double line were constructed, anticipating the route becoming a trunk line in due course. Joseph Locke agreed to be the engineer for the works, and Bruff became the resident engineer. The Eastern Counties Railway had already purchased some land for their line, between Colchester and Ardleigh; moreover they had not relinquished their powers to make a railway, and now made difficulties for the EUR in following the same route.

== Opening ==
Construction of the line commenced on 1 October 1844 near Bentley; plant and materials had already been landed at Cattawade on the River Stour. The main contractor was Thomas Brassey who sub-let parcels of work to sub-contractors.

Eastern Union Railway Amendment Act 1845
- Act of Parliament
- Parliament of the United Kingdom
- Long title: An Act to amend the Act relating to the Eastern Union Railway Company, and to raise a further Sum of Money for the Purposes of the said Undertaking.
- Citation: 8 & 9 Vict. c. xciv

Dates
- Royal assent: 21 July 1845

Other legislation
- Repealed by: Great Eastern Railway Act 1862

Status: Repealed

On 11 December 1844 the board resolved to lay double track; this would incur an additional £50,000 of expenditure, and this was authorised by act of Parliament, the Eastern Union Railway Amendment Act 1845 (8 & 9 Vict. c. xciv) on 21 July 1845. The Eastern Counties Railway (ECR) had resumed construction north of Colchester, in an attempt to resurrect their Harwich branch, already rejected by Parliament. It was being laid in defiance of the alignment defined in the ECR act and had excessive gradients. The EUR petitioned to adopt the works and build the line themselves to their own specification, but the matter went to arbitration, and was resolved only by the EUR purchasing and completing the works, at a heavy cost.

By May 1845 the earthworks were complete between Ipswich and Ardleigh, and the timber viaducts across the Stour were completed in December, although the embankments each side were not completed until May 1846. The directors were then able to traverse the line by special train on 2 May 1846. It ran from Ipswich to Colchester, taking an hour and a half to complete the journey.

Revenue earning goods services commenced on 1 June 1846; on 4 June Major General Pasley visited the line to carry out the Board of Trade inspection; approval was required to start passenger operation. Pasley was satisfied and a ceremonial opening took place on 11 June 1846: a train departed from Ipswich for Colchester, where it picked up a number of notaries, including George Hudson, chairman of the ECR, and Joseph Locke. On return to Ipswich lavish celebrations took place for all involved in the railway and in the evening a balloon ascent over the town was made by a famous balloonist, Charles Green.

The line opened for public passenger service on 15 June 1846 from an end-on junction with the ECR at its Colchester station to a terminus at Ipswich, a distance of 17 miles; there were three intermediate stations, Ardleigh, Manningtree and Bentley. It was the first railway to reach Ipswich.

== Ipswich and Bury Railway ==
From the earliest days, the EUR had intended to extend beyond Ipswich, to Bury and to Norwich. This was opposed by the ECR, which planned to be the sole connection to Norwich when their line from Ely was completed. A number of other competing schemes went to the 1845 session of Parliament, and key among these was the EUR's Bury extension railway. This was promoted as a nominally independent company, the Ipswich and Bury Railway Company (I&BR). This was incorporated on 21 July 1845 with share capital of £400,000 to build from Ipswich to Bury St Edmunds. The proposed line was 26 miles long, following the Gipping Valley. Once again Thomas Brassey was given the contract for construction; an elaborate ground breaking ceremony took place on 1 August 1845.

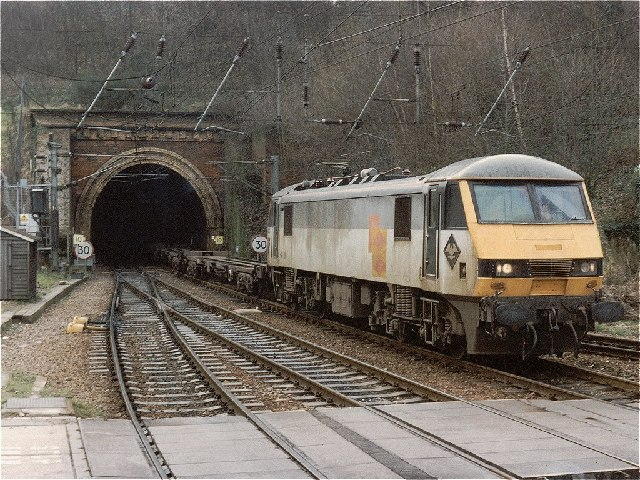
Stoke Hill Tunnel, Ipswich, in 1994

The EUR Ipswich station was a terminus, at the corner of Wherstead Road and Croft Road, and was unsuitable for continuing northwards. The new line diverged from the earlier route at Halifax Junction, a little to the south of the station. The planned line was to pass through a tunnel under Stoke Hill. (Note: Moffat says, page 54, "There is a tradition in the locality that Bruff decided to have a tunnel here merely from motives of personal vanity." However the ridge that forms the high ground of Stoke Hill could hardly be passed otherwise. Moffat also says, page 54, "Ipswich Tunnel was probably the first ever driven on so sharp a curve throughout its length." On page 209 Moffat contradicts this: "The tunnel was hailed locally as the first curved one. But according to Whishaw (1842), tunnels on a radius of a mile were already in use at [Bromsgrove and Callander].")

The tunnel was to be 361 yards in length; it was Bruff's first tunnel, and it proved very difficult to build, particularly due to ground water, and at one stage Bruff considered abandoning the tunnel, but it was completed in September 1846 and on 19 September 1846 a celebratory dinner was held in the tunnel.

A further challenge for construction was in the Stowmarket area, where there was marshy ground; indeed the bog was ascertained to be 80 feet deep. The EUR employed George Stephenson's method for building across the Chat Moss bog, and a raft of brushwood and faggots was used to give the embankment a firm footing. The River Gipping was also diverted to aid the project.

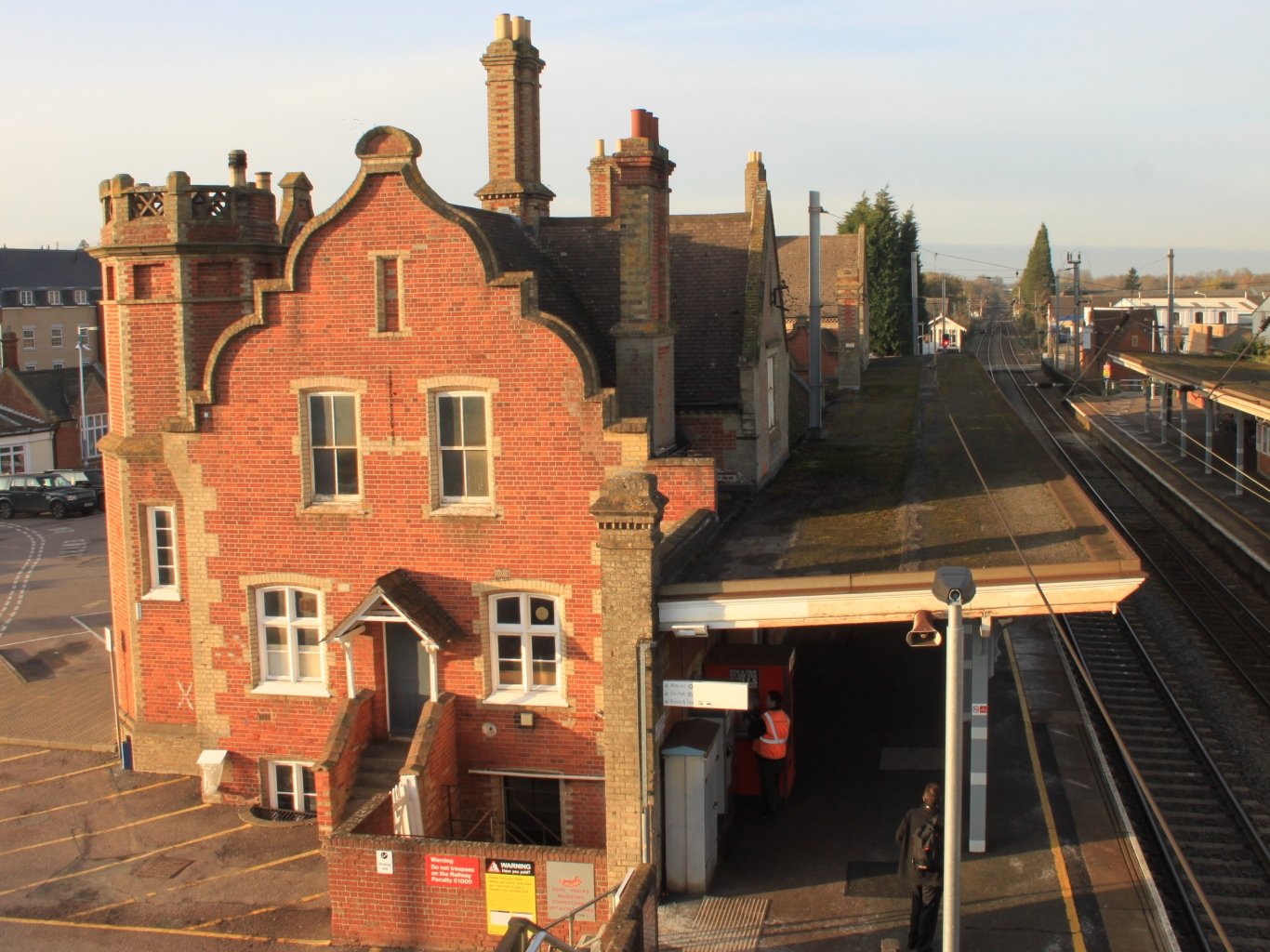
The I&BR station at Stowmarket station - view from the south in 2013

On 26 November 1846 the first test train ran to Bury St Edmunds with stops at most stations on the route. The Bury station had not been completed, so a temporary station on the Ipswich side of an uncompleted road bridge was used. An elaborate celebratory meal was given. Goods operation on the line started on 30 November 1846, and a formal opening followed on 7 December 1846, when a special train ran from Shoreditch (ECR station) to Bury. The Board of Trade inspection took place on 15 December 1846 and the line opened for traffic on 24 December. The permanent station at Bury opened in mid-November 1847, after a bridge over the main road had been finished, enabling the short extension.

The EUR Ipswich station was a terminus on a short spur, by-passed by the Ipswich and Bury Railway main line, so trains to and from Bury St Edmunds reversed from that station to the point of junction (Halifax Junction). It was not until 1860 that the through station (at the present-day location) was provided.

== Extending to Norwich, and amalgamation ==
Norwich was now the objective sought by many railway interests. At this time the Railway Mania was at its height, and several schemes to reach Norwich were deposited for the 1846 session of Parliament, including projects in which the Eastern Counties Railway had an interest. The Ipswich and Bury Railway (I&BR) promoted a line from a triangular junction north of Stowmarket (at Haughley) (Note: The junction was not built as a triangle, the west-to-north arm being omitted.) to Norwich by way of Diss, and it was this that gained royal assent on 27 July 1846 as the Ipswich and Bury Railway (Norwich Extension) Act 1846 (9 & 10 Vict. c. cclxxx). A branch from Bentley to Hadleigh was also authorised.

The I&BR was authorised to take additional capital of £550,000, and the Ipswich and Bury Railway (Norwich Extension) Act 1846 permitted amalgamation with the Eastern Union Railway. Shareholders' meetings of both companies were held on 8 December 1846, and the amalgamation was approved, to take practical effect on 1 January 1847. The combined company would be called the Eastern Union Railway. The authorised capital of the I&BR was £1,266,666 and that of the (old) EUR was £400,000. However most of the I&BR capital had not yet been subscribed, so a complex capital structure in the new company had to be formulated. The arrangements were ratified by the Eastern Union Railway Act 1847 (10 & 11 Vict. c. clxxiv) of 9 July 1847, and, after considerable delay, by the railway commissioners in February 1848.

The Railway Mania had expired suddenly, and in the slump that followed money was extremely difficult to come by, so that construction to Norwich was slow, not beginning until 1848.

== Extension to Norwich ==
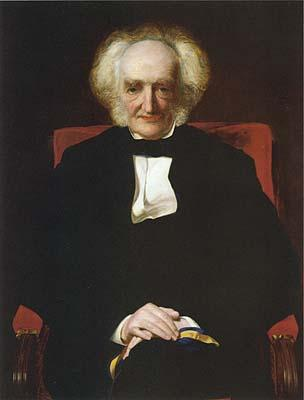
Sir Samuel Bignold (1791–1895), in a portrait of 1874

The building of the line on to Norwich provided a number of technical challenges, in particular another marshy stretch known as Thrandeston Bog, which was eventually overcome by the sinking of weighted faggots. The contractor's engine (probably "Skylark") reached Diss on 19 January 1849, amid considerable rejoicing: it was the first railway locomotive in Norfolk. Samuel Bignold, Mayor of Norwich, gave much practical and financial help to the construction.

The line was opened in stages: from Haughley to Finningham on 7 June 1848; Finningham to Burston on 2 July 1849, and a passenger service throughout to Burston started that day. On 3 November 1849 a special train for the directors reached Norwich, and on 7 November a full ceremonial opening run took place. Goods traffic throughout the line started on 3 December 1849, and full passenger operation followed on 12 December 1849.

The Norwich station was known as Norwich Victoria from the outset: the Eastern Counties Railway already had a major station, "Thorpe," in Norwich (by leasing the Norfolk Railway).

Opening Throughout to Norwich: The Public are respectfully informed that this Line of Railway will be opened throughout to the Victoria Station, Norwich, for the conveyance of passengers, goods, and live stock on Wednesday, the 12th instant. Particulars of Trains, Fares, Rates, &c., may be obtained on and after Monday, the 10th instant, at all the Company's Stations. J F Saunders, Secretary, Ipswich, Dec. 5th, 1849.

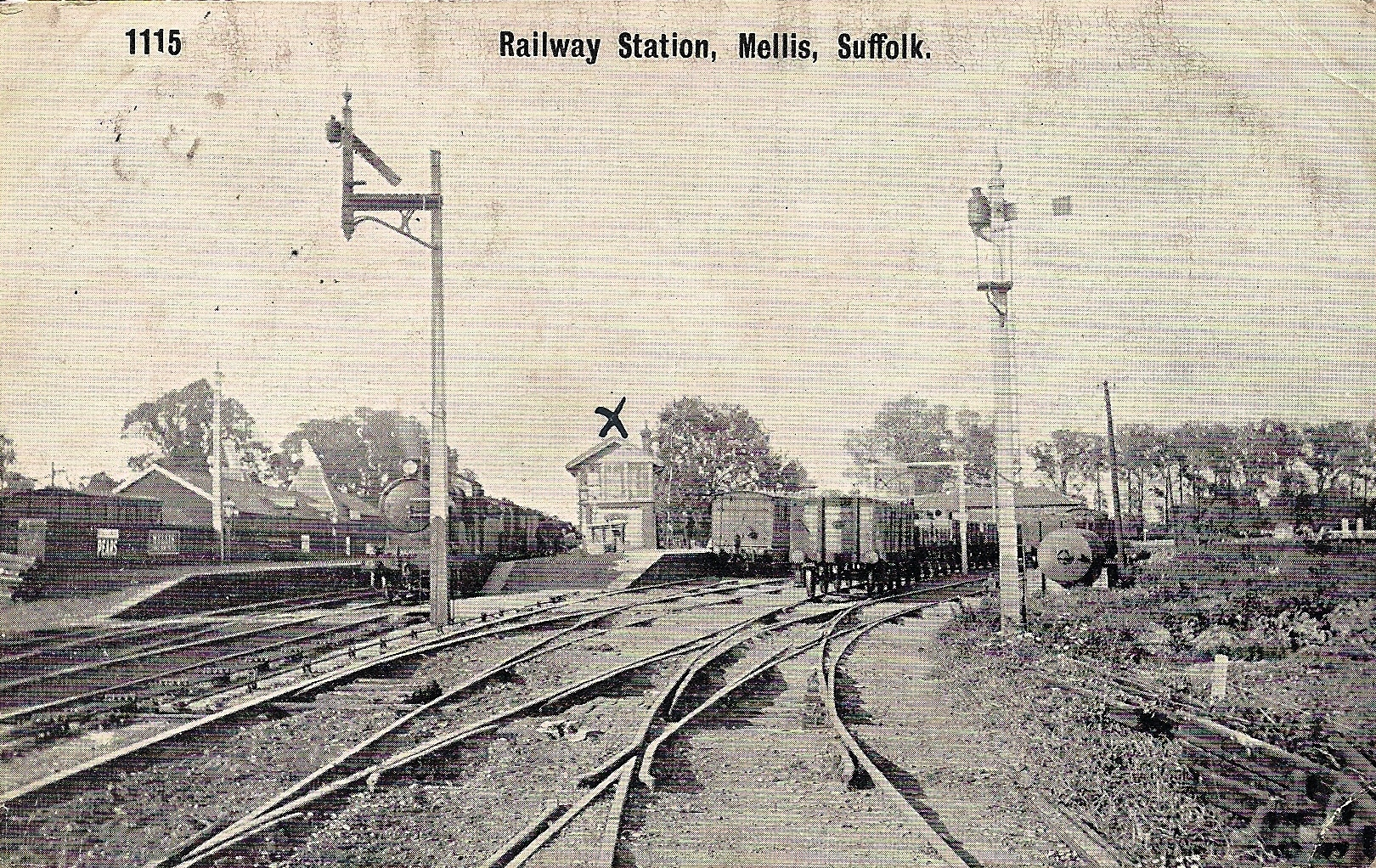
Mellis station about 1900

Victoria station was a terminus, and the Eastern Union wished to connect with the network controlled by the Eastern Counties Railway, to enable onward connections. The ECR had its own line from London to Norwich and did not regard the EUR as an ally, but a connecting line about a mile long was made to the ECR at Trowse Lower Junction, not far from the ECR Norwich terminus. At a gradient of 1 in 84 it was the steepest on the EUR system. It was used by special trains to Yarmouth races on 9 and 10 September 1851, although regular services did not start until 1 October. This was the last section of railway built by the EUR before takeover by the ECR. The hostility of the ECR was such that EUR locomotives were not permitted to enter ECR track; arriving trains for Thorpe station had to run round clear of the junction, and be propelled to that point for an ECR engine to couple and continue the journey.

The ECR later leased the EUR, and the City Corporation of Norwich insisted on a clause in the authorising act of Parliament, the Eastern Counties and the Norfolk and Eastern Union, the East Anglian, and the Newmarket Railways Act 1854 (17 & 18 Vict. c. ccxx), preventing the ECR from abandoning Victoria station so far as future passenger operation was concerned.

XVII. It shall not be lawful for the Company to close or discontinue to Victoria Station at Norwich now belonging to the Eastern Union Railway Company, or to do or omit to do any Matters or Things so as to prejudice or impair the Use of the same by the Public, and the Railway belonging to the last-mentioned Company shall, after the passing of this Act, be as fairly and efficiently worked and kept up as a Route between Norwich and London as the same was worked and kept up before and at the Time of the passing of this Act ... — Section 17, Eastern Counties and the Norfolk and Eastern Union, the East Anglian, and the Newmarket Railways Act 1854 (17 & 18 Vict. c. ccxx)

== Hadleigh Branch ==
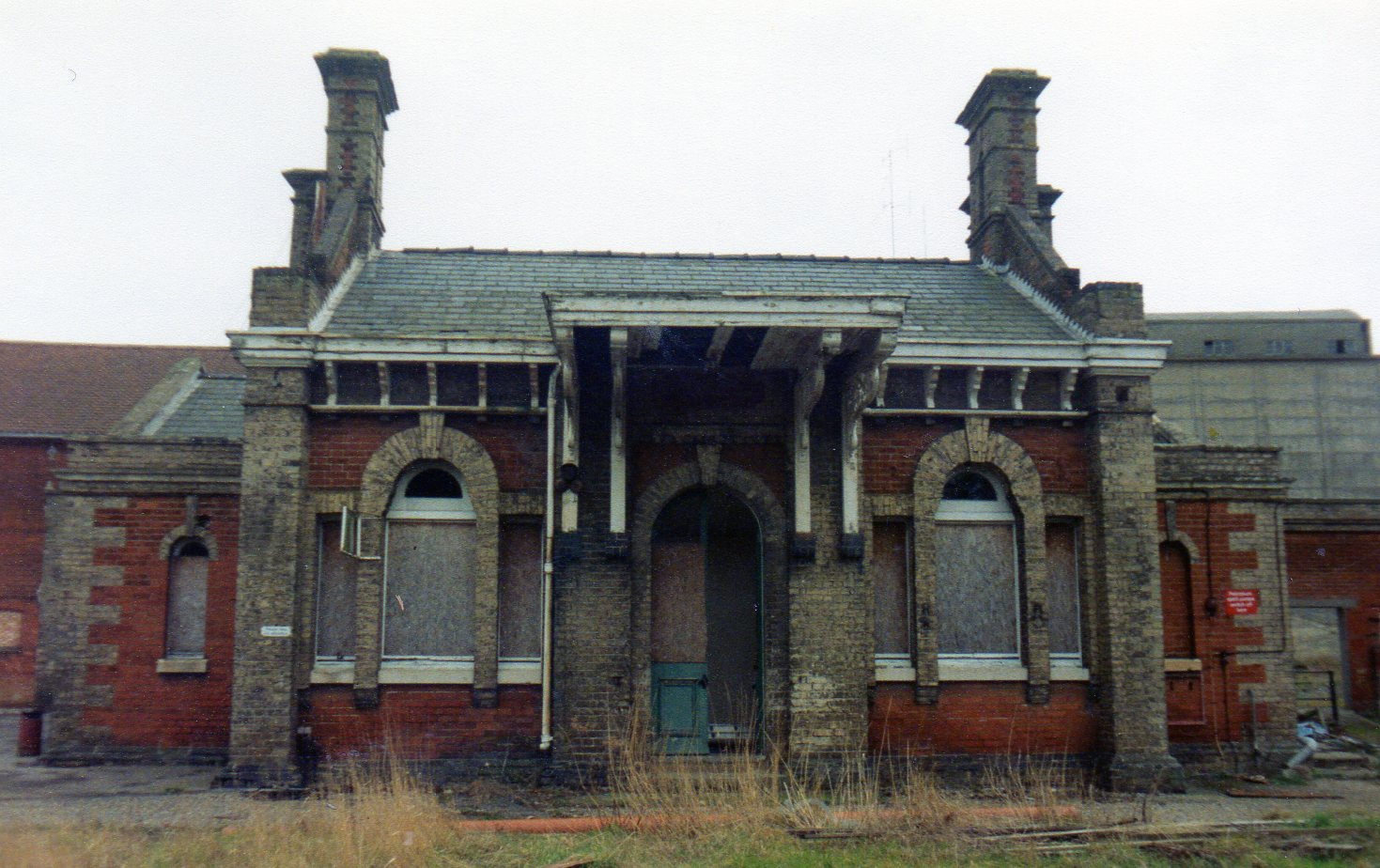
Hadleigh railway station

The market town of Hadleigh was at one time to be a junction on a Colchester to Bury line, giving access to an Ipswich branch. When the EUR line was actually built, interests in Hadleigh saw the possible disadvantage to trade in their town of not being on the railway network: Bentley was seven miles away. The nominally independent Eastern Union and Hadleigh Junction Railway (EU&HJR) was formed with the support of the EUR, and its authorising act of Parliament, the Eastern Union and Hadleigh Junction Railway Act 1846 (9 & 10 Vict. c. liii), was secured on 18 June 1846 to build a branch from Bentley to Hadleigh.

The branch was formally opened on 20 August 1847, and goods traffic started the following day; the ordinary public passenger service started on 2 September 1847. Amalgamation with the EUR had been intended throughout, and the Eastern Union and Hadleigh Junction Railway Sale Act 1847 (10 & 11 Vict. c. xix) authorising it was passed on 8 June 1847 and formally completed on 20 October of that year.

== Ipswich docks: Griffin Wharf and the Wet Dock ==
Ipswich had an important dock system; already before the railways it was important in serving the hinterland, and it was natural that the EUR wished to connect the docks. A line was completed from Halifax Junction running alongside the River Orwell to Griffin Wharf by mid-1846. In October 1847 the line was extended north alongside the New Cut to serve additional factory premises and wharves. Considerable volumes of imported (coastwise) coal were brought in through this line.

Ipswich Wet Dock was on the north-east side of the New Cut, and a railway connection to it was created by building eastwards from the area of the I&BR through station. This was completed in 1848, but it needed to cross the public road on the level near Stoke Bridge, and the Corporation of Ipswich objected to the use of steam traction crossing the road there; for many years horses were the only haulage on the dock lines. Ipswich Lower Goods Yard was constructed by the ECR on this line in 1860, and could be used by steam locomotives.

== Harwich Branch ==
Harwich was an important port for ferries to the Netherlands and North Germany, and in 1836 a line was surveyed from Colchester to Harwich, but the scheme was not pursued. In 1841 the railway speculator John Attwood presented a bill to Parliament in 1844, but his scheme failed.

Eastern Union and Harwich Railway and Pier Act 1847
- Act of Parliament
- Parliament of the United Kingdom
- Long title: An Act to empower the Eastern Union Railway Company to make a Railway from the Eastern Union Railway at Manningtree to Harwich, with Branches thereout; and for other Purposes.
- Citation: 10 & 11 Vict. c. ccxxv

Dates
- Royal assent: 22 July 1847

Other legislation
- Repealed by: Great Eastern Railway Act 1862

Status: Repealed

Text of statute as originally enacted

It was the EUR which succeeded in getting an act of Parliament, the Eastern Union and Harwich Railway and Pier Act 1847 (10 & 11 Vict. c. ccxxv), on 22 July 1847, authorising share capital of £200,000. Work started near Manningtree in October 1848. In the meantime the EUR was having difficulty funding its Norwich extension, and it considered using the £200,000 on that line rather than the Harwich branch. John Bagshaw, the MP for Harwich, objected violently, and took out an injunction to stop the EUR using the money for this purpose, but for the time being construction work was in abeyance. Work resumed in January 1853, and on 29 July 1854 the first train ran. The Board of Trade inspection was undertaken on 4 August, and the line opened fully on 15 August 1854. By this time the ECR had taken over operation of the EUR, so that the branch was operated by the ECR from the outset.

== Woodbridge extension ==
In November 1846 both the EUR and I&BR proposed schemes to link Ipswich with Woodbridge, about 8 miles away. Both schemes were drawn up by Bruff and the EUR scheme involved a 1,000 yard tunnel under Ipswich reaching Woodbridge via Kesgrave and Martlesham. The I&BR scheme bill was passed on 9 July 1847 as the Ipswich and Bury Railway (Woodbridge Extension) Act 1847 (10 & 11 Vict. c. cxxxvii), authorising share capital of £200,000.

In 1853 the East Suffolk Railway started to extend from Halesworth southwards towards Woodbridge and the EUR plans were amended to accommodate through running. The EUR was leased by the ECR on 7 August 1854, so it was under the ECR that the line was opened on 1 June 1859. That day the ECR also took over operations of the East Suffolk Railway.

== The Stour Valley and The Hythe ==
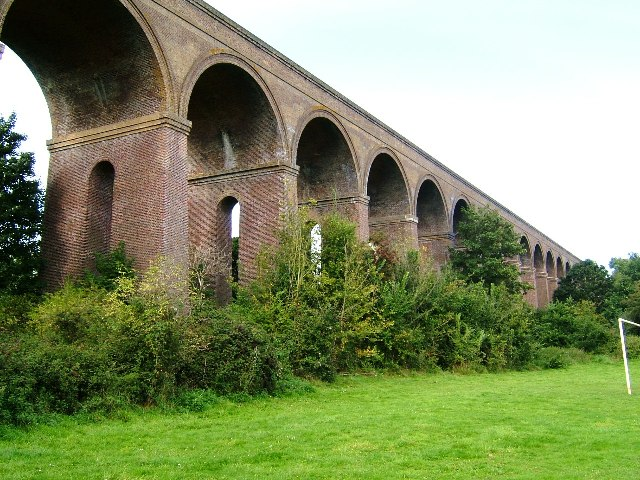
Chappel Viaduct, near Wakes Colne

The Colchester, Stour Valley, Sudbury and Halstead Railway was promoted in 1845 with Bruff as engineer. It was to be a 12-mile branch from a triangular junction at Marks Tey, 5 miles south of Colchester, to Sudbury, Suffolk, and from Chappel to Halstead. The authorising act of Parliament, the Colchester, Stour Valley, Sudbury and Halstead Railway Act 1846 (9 & 10 Vict. c. lxxvi), was passed on 26 June 1846 with share capital authorised at £250,000. In fact the Halstead branch was not built and the powers lapsed; they were revived by a separate company, the Colne Valley and Halstead Railway, which built the line later. The intended triangular junction at Marks Tey was also not built in that form; the junction was only made towards Colchester.

Another short line was built by the Colchester, Stour Valley, Sudbury and Halstead Railway: it was from a junction with the Eastern Counties at Colchester to The Hythe, where the Borough of Colchester owned a quay to and from which small sea-going ships used to make their way; this was opened on 31 March 1847. The company had running powers over the ECR between Marks Tey and Colchester. The CSVS&HR arranged to lease its line for 999 years to the Ipswich and Bury Railway; by the time this came into legal effect the I&BR and the EUR had amalgamated, so that the (new) EUR was the lessee. The annual rent was £9,500, ratified by the Colchester, Stour Valley, Sudbury and Halstead Railway Lease Act 1847 (10 & 11 Vict. c. xxi) of 8 June 1847.

The line is notable for the Chappel Viaduct over the Colne Valley at Chappel. Until 1982 it was the longest bridge in East Anglia, with a total of 32 arches of 30 ft span, and a maximum height of 74 ft above the River Colne. Designed by Bruff, it cost £21,000 to construct. It was built for double track, although only a single line was laid.

In June 1848 the I&BR were in talks with the EUR and the terms of the lease were rejected at first, but fear of an ECR takeover ensured that a deal was done. On 30 May 1849 a special train was run and after Board of trade approval was received trains started running on 2 July.

The Hythe Quay branch of 1 3/4 miles opened to goods traffic only on 1 April 1847, using locomotives hired from the EUR. The first train carried coke and malt for Hanbury and Trumans brewery. A small goods station was established at Eastgate and in 1852 at Hythe in addition to the quay facilities. It was not until 1 March 1866 that the Tendring Hundred Railway extended the line to Wivenhoe and opened to passenger services; the route was later extended to Clacton and Walton-on-the-Naze.

== Absorbed by the Eastern Counties Railway ==
During most of the EUR's existence, the ECR had adopted a hostile and obstructive strategy, and took advantage of the fact that the EUR was dependent on the ECR for running through to London and Norwich Thorpe. From time to time, through fares were unavailable, connectional arrangements at Colchester were disrupted. In the 1850s the EUR became increasingly vulnerable. In November 1850 Cobbold presented a bill to Parliament requesting running powers to London, Lowestoft and Yarmouth all over ECR operated lines. Indeed, it seemed that through working of traffic would cease, although this was averted in March 1851. The EUR finances were in a serious state with considerable debts from building the Norwich extension, and operating costs had climbed to 60%. Cost-cutting measures were adopted, but the impact of these was not significant in scale. In early 1851 the EUR directors discussed leasing their line to the ECR, but that company turned the proposals down.

Thomas Brassey joined the EUR board, and he was fundamental in negotiating the takeover of the EUR. In late 1853 negotiations with the ECR were resumed, and agreement was reached on 19 December 1853. The ECR was to take over the working of the EUR network from 1 January 1854. The arrangement was sanctioned by the Eastern Counties and the Norfolk and Eastern Union, the East Anglian, and the Newmarket Railways Act 1854 (17 & 18 Vict. c. ccxx) of 7 August 1854. This was a lease and working agreement, and the EUR remained an independent company until the formation of the Great Eastern Railway on 7 August 1862. Nevertheless 1854 marked the end of the EUR as an operating railway.

== Locomotives ==
In June 1851 the EUR had 31 locomotives breaking down thus:

Builder	Wheel Arrangement	Number in service	Notes
Sharp Brothers	2-2-2	13	Some with 5' driving wheels, others 5' 6". Nos 1–6, 14–19 and 26
Hawthorns	2-2-2	3	Introduced 1846, 6' driving wheels Nos 11,12,13
Stothert & Slaughter	2-2-2	4	Nos 7,8,20,21
Stothert & Slaughter	0-4-2	6	Goods engines Nos 9,10,22-25
Sharp Brothers	2-2-2WT	4	Branch line use. Nos 27,29-31
Kitsons	2-2-2WT	1	Number 28

All locomotives carried a green livery and would have been maintained at Ipswich engine shed which at that time also functioned as the works facility for the EUR. The following locomotives were named:

- 1 - Colchester
- 2 - Ipswich
- 3 - City of Norwich
- 4 - Bury St Edmunds
- 5 - Orwell
- 6 - Stour
- 10 - Essex
- 11 - Suffolk (Note: It is possible that 10 was named Suffolk and 11 Essex)
- 28 - Aerial's Girdle

== Passenger train services in 1850 ==
=== Weekday Down direction ===
In the down (from London) direction there were services from Colchester at 7:30 a.m. (all stations except Ardleigh and Claydon) to Norwich Victoria. The 10:50 a.m. departure to Norwich Victoria called all stations whilst the 1:10 p.m. omitted Ardleigh, Bramford, Claydon, Finningham, Burston and Flordon. The 3:30 p.m. was the last train from Colchester to Norwich and called all stations although Colchester departures at 8:05 p.m. called all stations to Ipswich whilst the following 10:49pm omitted to call at Bentley Junction on its way to Ipswich. This service also carried mail.

At Bentley Junction a connection from all the Norwich trains was available for the Hadleigh branch and connections to Bury St Edmunds were available from all the Colchester services at Haughley Junction although it is not clear whether these were through carriages or passengers had to change.

=== Weekday Up direction ===
In the up direction services departed Norwich Victoria at 7:20 and 11:10 in the morning and 4:15 and 5:30 in the afternoon. All of these services had connections from Bury St Edmunds although only three of them had connections at Bentley Junction. In the up direction there were also two early morning services from Ipswich to Colchester with the 1:20 a.m. mail train and the 7:00 a.m. giving a connection via the ECR to Liverpool Street arriving at 10:05 a.m.

=== Sunday services ===
There was one daily train between Colchester and Norwich (both directions) and three between Colchester and Ipswich. Hadleigh had no services on Sunday but it is not clear what the service to Bury St Edmunds was as it shows three services in the up direction and none in the down. This might be a printing error and the Ipswich starting trains may have started from Bury St Edmunds.

== Topography ==
Location list during the lifetime of the Eastern Union Railway and the Ipswich and Bury Railway only; station names in bold are still open.

- **Colchester**; junction with the Eastern Counties Railway;
- Ardleigh;
- **Manningtree**;
- Bentley;
- Ipswich Stoke Hill (EUR).
- Halifax Junction;
- **Ipswich** (I&BR station);
- Bramford;
- Claydon;
- Needham; still open as **Needham Market**;
- **Stowmarket**;
- Haughley;
- Finningham;
- Mellis;
- **Diss**;
- Burston;
- Tivetshall;
- Forncett;
- Flordon;
- Swainsthorpe;
- Trowse Upper Junction;
- Norwich Victoria.
- Haughley (above);
- **Elmswell**;
- **Thurston**;
- Bury; still open as **Bury St Edmunds**.
- **Marks Tey**; Eastern Counties Railway station;
- Chappel; still open as **Chappel and Wakes Colne**;
- **Bures**;
- **Sudbury**.
- Trowse Upper Junction; above;
- Trowse Lower Junction; convergence with Norfolk Railway line to Thorpe station.
