= Lowestoft North railway station =

Former railway station in Suffolk, England

Coordinates: 52.4921°N 1.7497°E

Lowestoft North
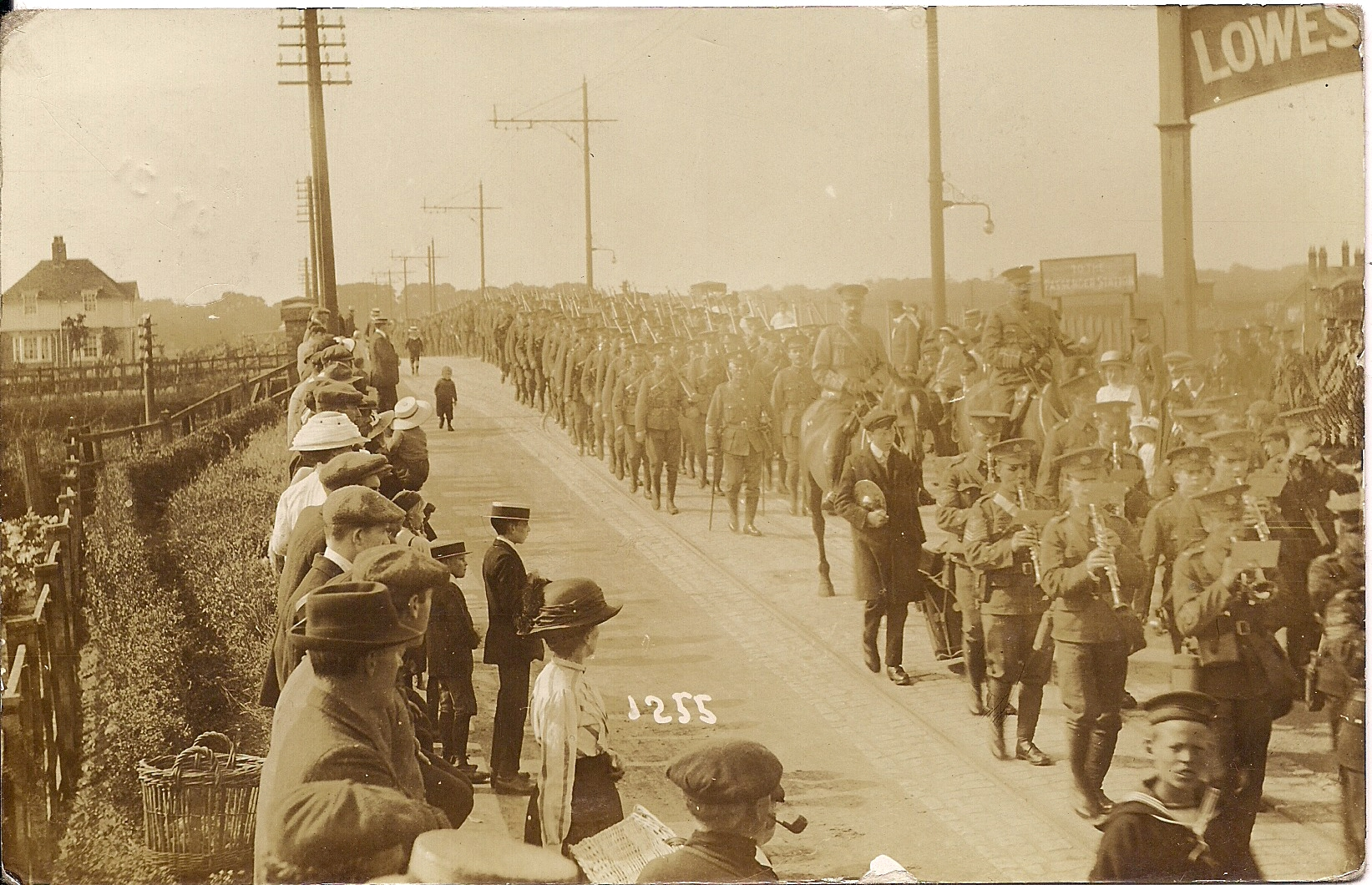
- The 4th Battalion Suffolk Regiment marching from Lowestoft North to its camp along the Yarmouth Road; the tram standards and rails of Lowestoft Corporation Tramways can be seen.

General information
- Location: Lowestoft, East Suffolk; England
- Grid reference: TM546948
- Platforms: 2 (reduced to 1 in the 1960s)

Other information
- Status: Disused

History
- Original company: Norfolk and Suffolk Joint Railway
- Pre-grouping: Norfolk and Suffolk Joint Railway
- Post-grouping: Norfolk and Suffolk Joint Railway; Eastern Region of British Railways

Key dates
- 13 July 1903: Opened
- 6 November 1967: Closed to goods traffic
- 4 May 1970: Closed to passengers
Location

Lowestoft North was a railway station in Lowestoft, Suffolk, England. It was a stop on the Yarmouth-Lowestoft line, which closed in 1970. The station was located just to the east of the A12, opposite the Denes High School; a site which is now occupied by Beeching Drive.

== History ==
Lowestoft North was opened on 10 July 1903 by the Norfolk and Suffolk Joint Railway as part of its line from Yarmouth to Lowestoft. As the last Norfolk & Suffolk station on the line, it was situated 10 miles 11 chains (16.3 kilometres) from Yarmouth Beach railway station. The station covered a large area and was provided with two long platforms lit by electric lamps in anticipation of large numbers of passengers. The station was located immediately to the north of the Yarmouth Road and comprised imposing station buildings on either side of the tracks, which were connected by a footbridge. On the Down side, there was a spacious goods yard with a weighing machine and cattle pens. The station remained little changed during its lifetime.

Before the line that served this station was built, it was intended for the line to branch off just to the south of Lowestoft North Station to a terminus station called Lowestoft Beach, on the Denes, because the owning company could not obtain powers to take the line into Lowestoft Central station (then just called Lowestoft). This was resolved, but the proposed Lowestoft Beach terminus and branch was never built.

The station became an important coal depot with the line dealing with 20,000 tons of coal a year. It was also a popular location for the movement of troops by the military which had camps nearby on the North Denes and on what is now Corton Road playing field. The March 1908 timetable shows three weekday afternoon/evening services from Lowestoft North to Yarmouth Beach; the journey time was 26 minutes. The first service departed at 1317, arriving at Yarmouth Beach at 1343; it then proceeded via North Walsham Town (1454), Melton Constable (1530), South Lynn (1656), Holbeach (1734), Bourne (1802) and terminating at Saxby (1845).

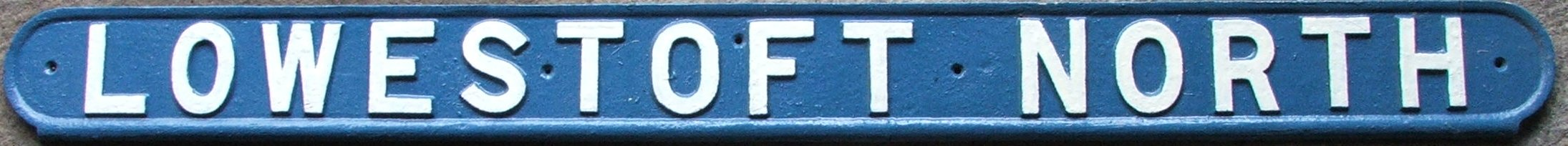
Nameplate from a platform bench seat

The development of holiday camps along the Suffolk coast from the 1930s onwards brought lengthy trains to the Yarmouth-Lowestoft line. In the 1950s, The Easterling departed from Liverpool Street at 1500 on summer Saturdays, travelling to Yarmouth South Town via Gorleston-on-Sea and Lowestoft North, its first stop being at Lowestoft Central where it reversed. Each Saturday during the summer of 1957, the local passenger service was supplemented by two trains to Liverpool Street and four trains bringing passengers in the opposite direction. There was also a service in each direction to Derby and Leicester, plus a through train to York. The station was host to a LNER camping coach from 1935 to 1939. A camping coach was positioned here by the Eastern Region from 1952 to 1965, from 1961 the coach was a Pullman camping coach; they were used as accommodation for holidaymakers.

In September 1966, the line was singled and all intermediate stations became unstaffed halts. From this point onwards, it became a deteriorating ghost line. In the last few years before closure, the line became a long siding providing a skeleton passenger service which was very cheap to run and with no level crossings of any importance. Once staff had been withdrawn, access to the station was via a side gate rather than through the booking hall which was locked out of use. The goods yard closed on 6 November 1967 and Lowestoft North signal box also closed the next day, the last box still in use in Norfolk and Suffolk at the time. The station closed on 4 May 1970.

Preceding station	Disused railways	Following station
Corton; Line and station closed	Norfolk and Suffolk Joint Railway; Yarmouth–Lowestoft Line	Lowestoft Central; Line closed, station open

== Present day ==
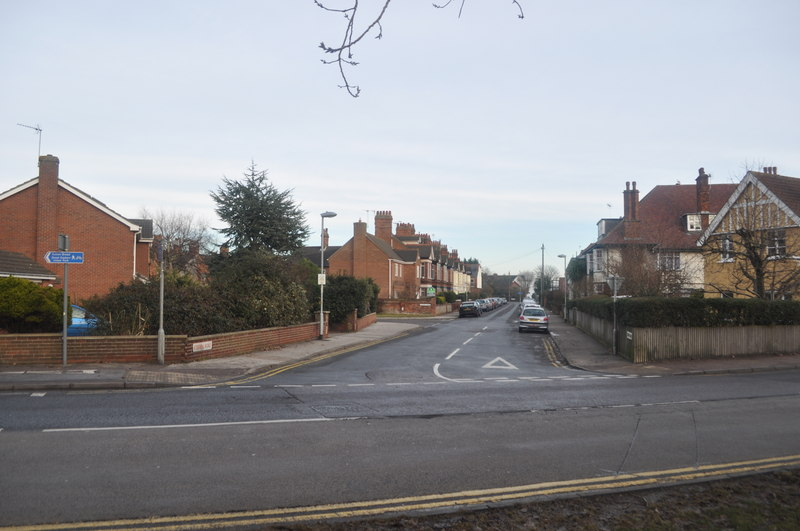
Station site looking north, December 2010

After closure of the line, the land in the vicinity of Lowestoft North was purchased for residential development. Housing now completely covers the site, but the memory of the line lives on as the roads have names associated with the railway, such as Beeching Drive.

Part of the original route between Lowestoft Central and Lowestoft North, where the tracks ran mostly below street level in an open cutting, has been made into a non-vehicular public right-of-way known as the Great Eastern Linear Park. After a period during which the line was left unused, overgrown and partially flooded for many years after its closure, a 600 m (660 yd) section between the North Quay Retail Park and Marham Road was made into a cyclepath as part of phase 1 of the scheme which was completed in Spring 1998. The second part of the route as far as Yarmouth Road was completed in Summer 2004 to create a 1,800 m (2,000 yd) corridor.

The stationmaster's house has survived nearby on the corner of Station Road in a fairly unchanged state. It resembles the stationmaster's house at Corton.
