= Lowestoft railway station =

Railway station in Suffolk, England

Coordinates: 52.4742°N 1.7498°E

Lowestoft
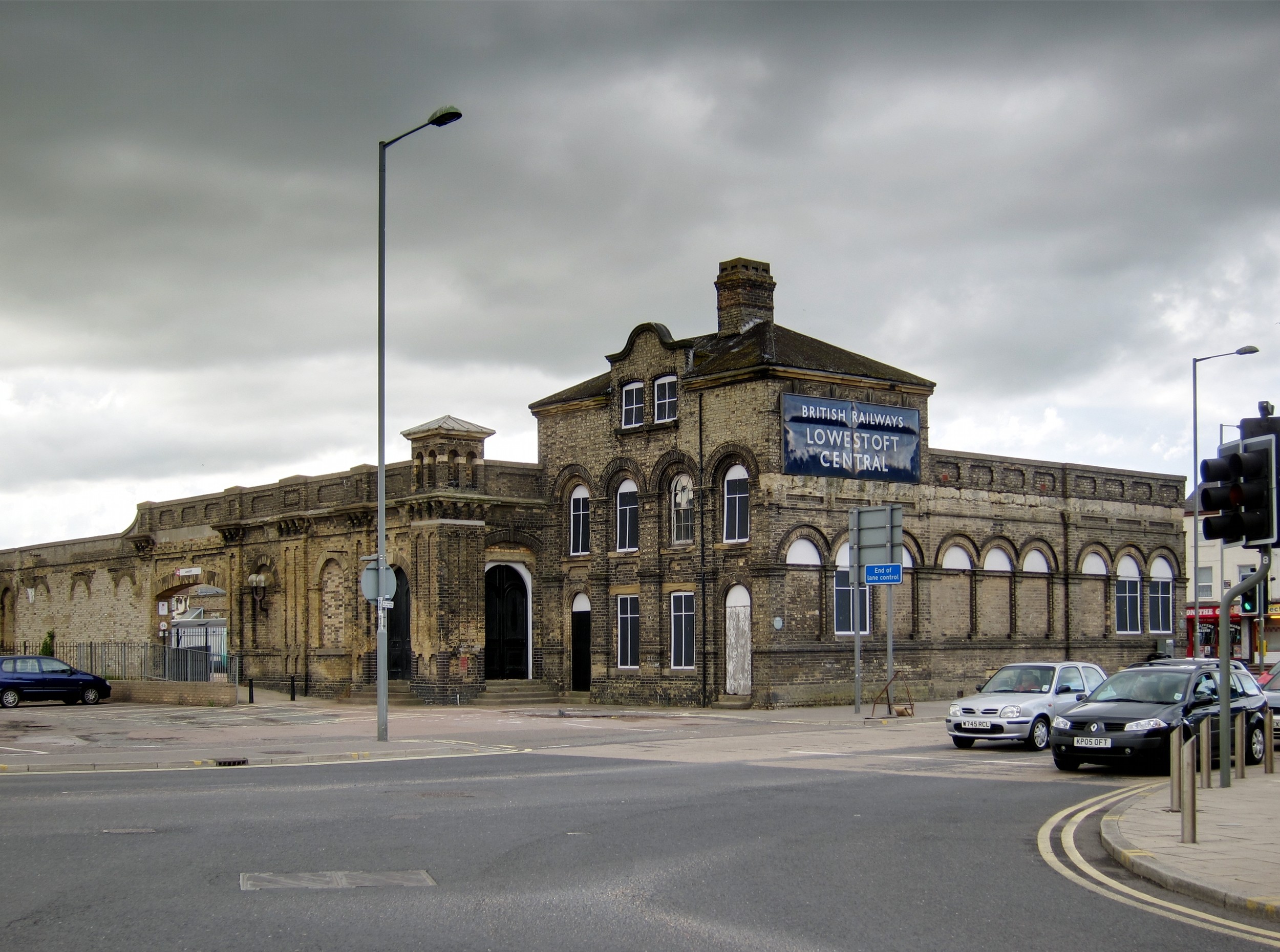
- Lowestoft railway station

General information
- Location: Lowestoft, East Suffolk; England
- Grid reference: TM547928
- Managed by: Greater Anglia
- Platforms: 3 (numbered 2, 3 and 4)

Other information
- Station code: LWT
- Classification: DfT category C2

History
- Original company: Norfolk Railway
- Pre-grouping: Eastern Counties Railway; Great Eastern Railway
- Post-grouping: London and North Eastern Railway; Eastern Region of British Railways

Key dates
- 1 July 1847: Opened as Lowestoft
- 1855: Rebuilt
- 1 October 1903: Renamed Lowestoft Central
- 3 May 1971: Renamed Lowestoft

Passengers
- 2020/21: ▼0.103 million
- Interchange: 1,837
- 2021/22: ▲0.355 million
- Interchange: ▲7,307
- 2022/23: ▲0.397 million
- Interchange: ▲9,046
- 2023/24: ▲0.426 million
- Interchange: ▲9,571
- 2024/25: ▲0.468 million
- Interchange: ▲9,861
Location
Notes
- Passenger statistics from the Office of Rail and Road

Lowestoft railway station (formerly Lowestoft Central) serves the town of Lowestoft, Suffolk. It is the eastern terminus of the East Suffolk Line from Ipswich and is one of two eastern termini of the Wherry Lines from Norwich (the other being Great Yarmouth). Lowestoft is 23 miles 41 chains (37.8 km) down the line from Norwich and 48 miles 75 chains (78.8 km) measured from Ipswich; it is the easternmost station on the National Rail network in the United Kingdom.

The station is currently managed by Greater Anglia, which also operates all of the trains that call. Services are typically formed of Class 755 FLIRT trains.

According to Office of Rail Regulation usage figures for 2010/11, Lowestoft was the fourth-busiest station in Suffolk, after Ipswich, Stowmarket and Bury St Edmunds. Until the late 1960s, the station was served more frequently, with regular express trains for holidaymakers in the summer to and from London Liverpool Street and local services to Great Yarmouth. As part of Greater Anglia’s latest franchising agreement in 2016, direct services between Lowestoft and London will return; however, there are currently "no indications of when services may be introduced".

== History ==
=== Early days ===
On 30 June 1845, the Lowestoft Railway and Harbour Company was incorporated to build a harbour and dock railway in Lowestoft. The scheme, which was promoted by Samuel Morton Peto, included a 11-mile-30-chain (18.3-kilometre) line from Lowestoft to the Yarmouth and Norwich Railway with which it formed a junction near Reedham. On 3 July 1846, the Norfolk Railway obtained a lease to construct the line, which it did by May 1847. The line was opened to goods on 3 May and to passengers on 1 July 1847. A second route was opened on 1 June 1859 with the completion of the Lowestoft and Beccles Railway which entered the town via a swing bridge over Oulton Broad, where a 1.75-mile (2.82-kilometre) freight line branched off to the south bank of Lowestoft harbour. The new line connected Lowestoft with London, Ipswich, Bungay and other places more conveniently without having to go via Norwich.

Lowestoft station opened on 1 July 1847. At the time of construction, the station was separated from the town on the clifftop by about ½-mile of green fields and farmland, although a new turnpike road (now known as London Road North) linked it to Lowestoft. Development was stimulated by the construction of the harbour later in 1847 and extension of the railway to a new fish market and cattle sheds. Initially, only two platforms were provided, but rebuilding took place in 1855 by Lucas Brothers when a more substantial and well-designed building was provided. The Italianate station is a fine example of their work, which also includes buildings such as the Royal Albert Hall, Liverpool Street station, York station and the Felixstowe Railway. In 1855, the station's roof burnt down and timber for the new roof was brought in from Scandinavia by Peto's North of Europe Steam Navigation Company. The main buildings were arranged in an L-shaped configuration, with the booking, enquiry and parcels offices laid out on the north side bordering Denmark Road, the refreshment rooms were on the east side opening into Station Square and the toilets and bookstall were to the south. The concourse was covered by an overall roof which extended some way over the tracks and platforms to provide a small train shed.

With the arrival of the railway, Lowestoft's population doubled in 16 years to reach 10,000 and by the end of the century it had increased to 36,000. In 1849, Peto constructed the esplanade and the Royal Hotel was opened. The Norfolk Railway was taken over by the Eastern Counties Railway in 1848, which provided a Friday service of cheap trains to London from summer 1859, with Lowestoft coaches being collected at Beccles by expresses from Yarmouth.

=== Growth ===
The Port of Lowestoft expanded rapidly to cover an area of 74 acres (30 hectares) in less than a century, which included over 6,000 feet (1,800 metres) of quay dealing in commodities and nearly 4,500 feet (1,400 metres) of quay dealing with fish traffic. This resulted in track and signal alterations between Lowestoft and Coke Ovens Junction in 1885 which were carried out by the Great Eastern Railway, which had taken over the Eastern Counties Railway in 1862. The two single lines from the junction were turned into double track, and an extra (third) platform was added at the station. Two new signalboxes were provided: one at Coke Ovens and the other on the north side of Lowestoft station. Engine sheds and a turntable were also provided.

The Great Eastern introduced the first direct services to and from London in 1863, with services leaving Bishopsgate railway station at 10.00am and taking 3¼ hours to complete the journey. On 1 June 1872, a new curve between Marsh Junction on the Yarmouth to Beccles Line and Swing Bridge Junction on the Yarmouth side of Haddiscoe High Level railway station enabled direct services between Lowestoft and Yarmouth South Town via St Olaves. The 1883 timetable shows eight stopping trains each way between Ipswich, Lowestoft and Yarmouth, with two or three services a day from London. A Mondays only service ran from Liverpool Street with stops at Ipswich, Halesworth and Beccles. The first non-stop express between London and Lowestoft ran in summer 1900 and by 1904 non-stop runs were provided on a regular basis during the summer period. The traditional access to London was however by shuttle train connection out of the Yarmouth services at Beccles or by portions split and worked forward from there. Nine or ten passenger services to Norwich operated on weekdays and four on Sundays in 1905, the frequency increasing to 12 each way on weekdays by 1921.

Holiday traffic to Lowestoft prospered, particularly after 13 July 1898 when the Norfolk and Suffolk Joint Committee opened a new line from Yarmouth Beach and Yarmouth South Town via Gorleston-on-Sea, Hopton-on-Sea and Corton to Lowestoft, where a second station serving the town, named Lowestoft North, was opened. The opening of a second station in the town resulted in the main station being renamed Lowestoft Central in 1903. The Great Eastern sought to foster the holiday traffic by providing a bus service to Southwold from 18 July 1904 to January 1913 and also one to Oulton Broad. The increased naval activity brought on by the First World War saw the number of passengers using Lowestoft Central via the Norfolk & Suffolk double from a pre-war average of 25,000 per year to a near-record of 54,506 in 1918. The record was reached in 1919 when 63,859 used the station. In Summer 1924, a long-distance restaurant car express ran from Liverpool, Manchester and Sheffield to Lowestoft and Yarmouth, while an all-year round service began operating to and from York with portions for Lowestoft and Yarmouth dividing at Reedham. The journey to York took just over six hours, while Liverpool was reached in seven hours. A restaurant car was added to the York express by the early 1930s and the service remained in the timetable until the mid 1960s, although in its later years a buffet car was used instead. The Holiday Camps Express ran via Lowestoft to serve the holiday camps along the coast from 1934 to 1939 and then after the war until 1958. Another express, The Easterling, was introduced in June 1950 to run non-stop between Liverpool Street and Beccles where a portion would be detached for Lowestoft.

Goods traffic had been constant for many years. The chief materials brought into Lowestoft included coal (from Leicester and Melton Mowbray), bricks (to Lowestoft North), pipes, glass, sheet metal plates, flour, beer, grain and wheel-rims to be exported to the Netherlands. Goods sent out from Lowestoft included canned foods, wood cases and fish to London and Bury St. Edmunds. Between 1899 and 1914, a travelling post office left the station at 2000 each evening, reaching Ipswich at 2340.

In 1914, a sleeper depot was opened on a reclaimed mud bank in Lake Lothing. It grew to cover 13 acres (5.3 hectares) and had a capacity of 450,000 sleepers as well as a 1,000-foot (300-metre) wharf enabling ships to unload directly. Following the closure of Melton Constable Works in 1936, the depot became a centre for the construction of many items such as fenceposts and building parts, which were sent all over the LNER and Eastern Region. The depot, which had its own 3 ft (910 mm) narrow gauge railway, incorporated a pre-cast sleeper depot which supplied over half of the Eastern Region with two or three special trains leaving it each week. In an average year, about 328,000 sleepers were dispatched with 10,600 tons of chairs and baseplates and many tons of small permanent way accessories. The activity continued until 1964 after which the land was used by Shell for offices, a helipad, supply ship berths and a stores complex. A siding serving Shell was closed later in the 1970s.

=== Decline ===
As early as the 1930s, the fish traffic began to decline until there were only seasonal specials on the Norfolk & Suffolk in addition to the fish vans on the daily return goods trip. The fall in income from fish traffic was only partially replaced by the development of holiday camps along the coast. In addition, the drop-off in traffic on the line between Yarmouth and Lowestoft via the Haddiscoe curve resulted in its closure in 1934 and lifting in 1939. The service had not been as fast as trains on the Yarmouth-Lowestoft line and by the 1930s it was also facing competition from buses on the A12. Nevertheless, the summer timetable for 1939 still showed seventeen services each way, most of which were all-stoppers, while others were combined with Yarmouth services at Reedham before continuing to Norwich in a journey time of up to one hour and sixteen minutes.

During the early years following nationalisation, services on the Norfolk & Suffolk line were busy on summer Saturdays but less patronised at other times when a single push and pull unit hauled by a GER Class M15 or a GER Class G69 sufficed. Reliance on summer traffic was not enough and when British Railways started making losses from 1952 onwards, attention was turned to pruning the network by closing unremunerative lines. Thus in 1953 when major repairs to Breydon Viaduct were required, it was decided that Lowestoft could be adequately served during the summer season by diverted trains via Norwich Thorpe, and so the ordinary passenger and freight services were withdrawn as from 20 September. A good service nevertheless continued between Yarmouth South Town and Lowestoft, as well as a Saturdays through train from Birmingham. In May 1956, Prince Philip visited Lowestoft to open the new South Pier Pavilion and LNER Thompson Class B1 No. 61399 was used to haul the train from Wickham Market Junction.

On 2 November 1959, passenger services on the Yarmouth-Beccles line ceased, partly due to the expense of maintaining the swing bridges at Beccles and St Olaves, and it was reported that the British Transport Commission wished to re-route the line's traffic via Lowestoft. However, although the Lowestoft-Yarmouth line was upgraded to take express traffic, including the lengthening of the station platforms, the London expresses to Yarmouth were sent via Norwich as from 18 June 1962. The line was subsequently recommended for closure in the Beeching report, together with the East Suffolk line from Westerfield as far as Lowestoft. At this time, there was a daily pick-up goods service between Yarmouth South Town and Lowestoft but this ceased on 4 November 1967 and the same weekend the line was singled. The Yarmouth-Lowestoft line closed on 4 May 1970 but the East Suffolk line was reprieved by Barbara Castle on 29 June 1966. The closure of the Yarmouth-Lowestoft line and Lowestoft North station resulted in the "Central" being dropped from Lowestoft's name as from 3 May 1971. The late 1960s also saw the platform awnings cut back, although the roof over the main concourse was left intact.

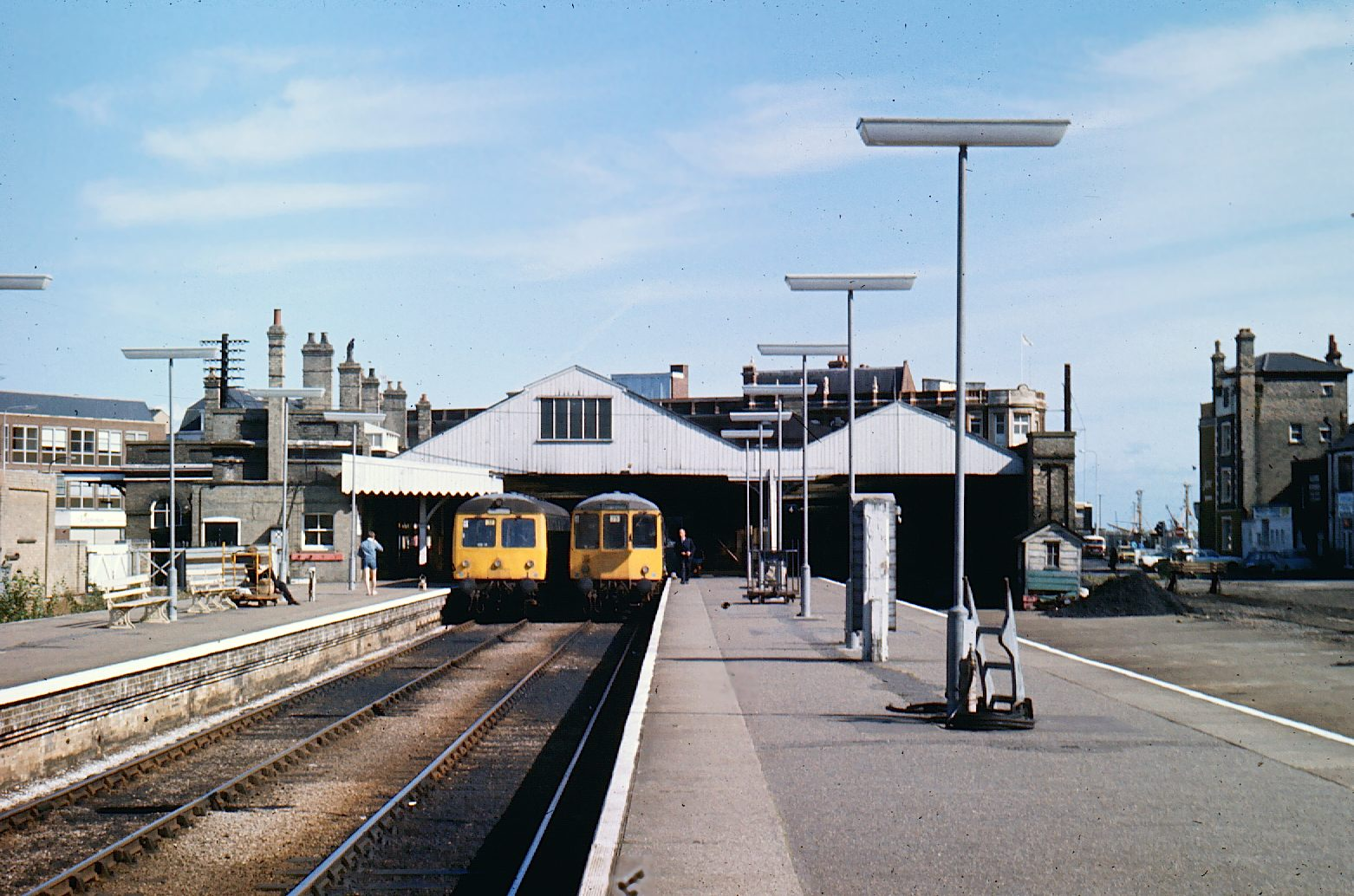
Lowestoft station in September 1977, before removal of the overall roof

Dieselisation was gradually implemented in Suffolk from the 1950s onwards. It began in 1954 when many steam engines were withdrawn from the Lowestoft area, followed in 1955 by the introduction of the two and four car diesel railcar units for the short services. After June 1960, the East Suffolk line was only served by diesel trains. The last recorded steam hauled passenger train left the station in June 1962, although for a number of years afterwards Class B1s were allocated to Lowestoft during the winter months to provide steam heating for hauled stock prior to departure behind diesel locomotives. The next steam-hauled passenger train at the station was not until 4 May 2002 when BR Standard Class 4 2-6-0 No. 76079 headed 'The Easterling' from Liverpool Street via Norwich. By the early 1960s, steam engines had almost disappeared from Lowestoft and in September 1962 the engine sheds and turntable finally closed. Long distance through services were also cut down with the loss of the through trains to Birmingham and York in late 1964 on the basis that Lowestoft did not have sufficient facilities for the storage and cleaning of coaches. The closure of the line between Lowestoft and Yarmouth South Town in 1970 saw the removal of the rails into platform 1. This section of the trackbed, as well as the siding which ran alongside, now forms part of the station car park.

Services on the East Suffolk Line consisted of eight or nine diesel multiple unit weekday workings to Ipswich, with a single InterCity train to London, supplemented by a second service on summer Saturdays. On winter Sundays, there were three services each way in the afternoon and evening. An hourly service was provided on the Lowestoft-Norwich line, with seven or eight trains each way on Sundays. The station continued to receive excursion traffic, mainly private charters by the Railway Development Society, as well as special services for football matches and Christmas shoppers.

=== Present day ===
==== Direct London services ====
The final direct London service of the British Rail era ran on 12 May 1984. On 26 September 1999, Anglia Railways reintroduced the service when the first service departed at 1005 drawn by one of Anglia's new Class 170 units. The weekday service left at 0656, arriving at Liverpool Street at 0931 and returning at 1900. Through Sunday services were withdrawn from the start of the summer 2000 timetable. As of December 2010 services to/from London via the East Suffolk Line and Norwich have been withdrawn.

==== 1992 rebuilding ====
Up until 1992 Lowestoft station retained many of its original features, including the wooden trussed ceiling, LNER clock and traditional departure boards. In 1992, alterations were carried out in the name of modernising and simplifying the structure; these involved removing some brickwork, refurbishing an area of the platforms, removing the station roof and canopies to create a new open, paved concourse and demolishing the bookstall and toilet block. In addition, a new toilet was provided for all passengers, trees were planted and interior alterations were carried out to the booking hall and office. The removal of the station's roof now provides no shelter for passengers from the North Sea wind. Although few amenities remain, the station does nonetheless retain a staffed booking office and ticket issuing machine. Before these works, the station was planned for demolition, with the station reduced to an unstaffed island platform halt.

Much of the original historical structure nevertheless remains, including one of the last original British Rail enamel signs in situ on its frontage, displaying "British Railways - Lowestoft Central". The original platforms 2 and 3 remain in daily use with platform 4 also available although not used for regular services; the platforms were not renumbered following the removal of platform 1.

The station was a finalist in Railtrack's Station of the Year 1999.

==== 2013 refurbishment ====
In May 2012, the station was described by local MP Peter Aldous as a "blot on the landscape" and a "pale shadow of its former self". He called for its refurbishment to be included as part of the next Greater Anglia franchise.

In early 2013, work began on redeveloping the exterior of the station with £1 million of funding from Suffolk County Council. One aim of the redevelopment was to create a more efficient transport interchange with bus routes within the town. The works include the resurfacing of the car park and adjoining land to create 70 additional car parking spaces, as well as redesigning the taxi rank and installing modern bus shelters with electronic information boards. Initial discussions took place in mid 2013 to renovate empty units within the station, in particular the former café which was housed in the large structure facing Station Square, with the help of local groups. On 18 February 2014, Peter Aldous MP officially opened a "Bike & Go" outlet at the station.

==== Goods traffic ====
Even by the late 1970s Lowestoft was still handling 25,000 tonnes of freight, an increase of some 18,000 compared to the mid 1970s. Goods consisted of domestic coal which was brought by train to a concentration depot at the end of Rotterdam Road, imported steel ingots which were sent on by rail, scrap metal exported to Spain by A. King & Sons and brought to Lowestoft by rail, imported Ford cars and container trains after an Orient Overseas Container Line ship was diverted from Felixstowe. The sleeper works was also producing around five wagon loads of concrete sleepers, posts and platform sections a day. Traffic declined in the 1980s as a result of national policies and trends, the withdrawal of vacuum-braked wagons leading to a loss in coal traffic and the increase in charges for imported steel resulting in this traffic moving to other ports.

There are still sidings to the station which are rarely used, although they no longer cross Station Square into the docks or across Commercial Road to what is today a car park and shop. Lowestoft remains a destination for specialised freight services which carry materials used in the offshore North Sea gas production industry. A wide variety of diesel locomotives have hauled these trains to Aberdeen over the years, including Classes 31, 37, 47, 58, 66 and 67. For many years, the frozen food industry in the area despatched much of its production by rail and in 1989, there was still a daily Speedlink service to the town. Little track rationalisation has taken place since the 1980s and the rail approach to the town is characterised by expanses of rarely used track.

=== Motive power depot ===
The first engine shed at Lowestoft was a two-road brick structure on the north side of the station with a turntable on a separate spur. It lay close to Denmark Road on the site of what was later the goods shed. The shed could only accommodate four locomotives and attracted complaints from local residents due to the smoke from the locomotives. New four-road sheds were built in 1882 at a cost of £5,650 on the north shore of Lake Lothing beyond what later became Coke Ovens Junction. The sheds were fine and ornate in the style of those at Yarmouth Vauxhall and March with extravagant brick detail and a vast iron water tank supported by tall vaulting running the width of the shed. The turntable was first on a single spur alongside the yard but later was enlarged to 65 feet (20 metres) and repositioned at the western boundary of the yard. In the 1930s, new coal handling and water softening plants were installed at a cost of £2,828.

By October 1954 the shed boasted the following allocation: 6 K3s, 1 E4, 5 J15s, 3 J17s, 2 F4s, 6 F5s, 6 F6s, 3 L1s, 1 J67 and 1 J68. Prior to 1954, Lowestoft was home to the last F3 class No. 67127 which first entered service in 1893 and was condemned at Ipswich in April 1953. Coded 32C by British Railways, the shed was officially closed in September 1960, although visiting locomotives continued to use the shed until it reportedly 'closed completely' on 7 July 1962. After a period as a cattle quarantine station, the sheds were demolished in 1983.

=== Harbour lines ===
==== North Quay ====
A short 0.25-mile (0.40-kilometre) single-track tramway was constructed by the Norfolk Railway from Lowestoft station heading eastwards across the A12 road to Lowestoft Fish Quay. A flagman was needed to cross the road and services were often hauled by small tank engines or Sentinels. In 1866, the line was replaced by conventional rails and over the next 60 years was extended to 0.75 miles (1.21 kilometres) to reach the end of the North Pier which had been constructed in response to the expansion of the fishing trade at Lowestoft. The Great Eastern Railway and other railway companies invested greatly in the harbour and its infrastructure, although they were not constructed with the fishing industry in mind. By 1892, £320,000 had been invested in the harbour which covered 20 acres (8.1 hectares) where nearly 1,000 registered fishing boats. Herring catches from the North Sea contributed to the 50,000-60,000 tons of fish landed annually in the early part of the twentieth century, the bulk of which were sent by rail to London.

Fishing boats returning with their catches were moored alongside the pier on which were railway wagons ready to receive the fish. A spacious covered market was opened by the Great Eastern in 1865 by the North Pier, lit by gas lamps and with landing stages 580 feet (180 m) long. The extent of the fish traffic necessitated fishworkers' specials to Lowestoft from Scotland for the autumn herring season when Scottish women from as far afield as Kyle of Lochalsh were brought down by the trainload to gut the herring and act as relief crew on the fishing boats. The Norfolk & Suffolk succeeded in capturing 5,000 tons per year of this fish traffic, around 10% of the total.

The fish trade suffered from continental competition and fish migration and ever decreasing quantities were shipped by rail as lorries were used for their transport. Traffic was lost to road not only because the prices were too high but also perhaps because transport by road saw fish rise to the top of the ice-packed containers in which they were shipped, whereas this did not happen on a smooth rail ride. Services eventually ceased in September 1973 at which time two vans of fish offal to be used as pet food were dispatched nightly. Although a new trade in whitefish developed and a new fish market opened in October 1987, rail plays no role in their transport.

==== South Side docks and Kirkley ====
The Lowestoft and Beccles Railway Act 1856 authorised a branch from a junction to the east of Oulton Broad South to South Side docks, as well as a short branch to a coal and goods depot at Kirkley. The line was known for a curious signal with an arm fixed at danger on both sides to warn drivers to take care. At Kirkley goods station, the single line fanned out into two groups of sidings: one on each side of the yard and both extending across Belvedere Road into the South Quay where wagon turntables were used to access the sidings. Another siding, reached only by turntable, ran parallel to the quay into Morton's cannery in Belvedere Road. When a Co-op factory opened, it was connected to the harbour line by a siding just east of a level crossing over Durban Road. South Side was worked according to the one engine in steam principle and horses were sometimes used for shunting. Outward traffic included joinery from Boulton & Paul's and cannery products, as well as confectionery and preserves mostly from Mortons and the Co-op. Inward traffic comprised oil for the Co-op's factory boilers, timber for Boulton & Paul and steel for the Brooke Marine shipyard. The Kirkley branch was closed in 1966 and the South Side line beyond Durban Road followed on 6 November 1967 with tracklifting a year or so later. The rest of the line remained open until 31 December 1972 to serve the Boulton & Paul yard, by which time it had become somewhat of an anachronism. Extensive redevelopment of the area in the early 21st century obliterated most of the remains of the South Side lines and the industrial businesses which they served.

== Facilities ==
Lowestoft station is conveniently situated between the south end of the shopping area in the town centre and the north end of the sea front. Facilities at the station include shelters, seating in the booking hall and toilets. There is also a ticket machine and a ticket office, which is staffed during the day.

A pay and display car park is provided, as is a taxi rank and cycle storage. Local buses call at the station, which is a Plusbus location.

== Services ==
As of January 2021, the typical Monday-Saturday off-peak service at Lowestoft is as follows:

Operator	Route	Rolling stock	Typical frequency
Greater Anglia	Lowestoft - Oulton Broad North - Somerleyton - Haddiscoe - Reedham - Cantley - Brundall - Norwich	Class 755	1x per hour in each direction
Greater Anglia	Lowestoft - Oulton Broad South - Beccles - Brampton (on request) - Halesworth - Darsham - Saxmundham - Wickham Market - Melton - Woodbridge - Ipswich	Class 755	1x per hour in each direction

On weekdays, the station sees an hourly service to Norwich, via the Wherry Lines, with an extra service in the morning. The services tend to be timed regularly, usually departing at around 50 minutes past the hour during the day; the final service usually departs at 23:30. Saturday services follow a similar pattern, with a reduced service on Sundays. The journey time to Norwich averages 40 minutes.

The service to Ipswich, via the East Suffolk Line, runs hourly following the opening of a passing loop at Beccles in December 2012; this usually leaves at 7 minutes past the hour. Sunday services run every two hours, but depart at 5 minutes past each hour from the first train at 08:05 to the last at 20:05. The average journey time to Ipswich is around 1 hour and 30 minutes.

Preceding station	National Rail	Following station
Oulton Broad North	Greater Anglia Wherry Lines; Lowestoft branch	Terminus
Oulton Broad South	Greater Anglia East Suffolk Line	Terminus
	Disused railways	
Lowestoft North Line and station closed	Norfolk and Suffolk Joint Railway Yarmouth-Lowestoft Line	Terminus

== Proposed developments ==
=== Relocation of the station ===
Waveney District Council had previously indicated in April 2010 that the station should be relocated 40m to the west and 80m to the south in order to "strike the optimum balance between commercial viability, technical feasibility and acceptability in the eyes of key stakeholders and landowners". Relocation would "release a significant parcel of land for redevelopment in Peto Square between Denmark Road and Commercial Road", although it was said that "existing historic station buildings should be retained and integrated into any new development." Network Rail has objected to this policy on the basis that this would reduce the patronage of the station as was the case with Cromer, Felixstowe and Sheringham and would incur substantial financial cost. Although the policy did not appear in the final version of the area action plan for Lake Lothing and the Outer Harbour Area, the document did nevertheless raise concerns as it purported to reduce the number of platforms at the station to two plus a siding for excursion trains.

=== Direct Yarmouth services ===
In January 2015, a Network Rail study proposed the reintroduction of direct services between Lowestoft and Yarmouth by reinstating a spur at Reedham. Services could once again travel between two East Coast towns, with an estimated journey time of 33 minutes, via a reconstructed 34-chain (680 m) north-to-south arm of the former triangular junction at Reedham, which had been removed in c. 1880. The plans also involve relocating Reedham station nearer the junction, an idea which attracted criticism.

== Bibliography ==
- Adderson, Richard; Kenworthy, Graham (November 2008). Branch Lines around Lowestoft: From Yarmouth to Beccles. Midhurst, West Sussex: Middleton Press. ISBN 978-1-906008-40-6.
- Adderson, Richard; Kenworthy, Graham (February 2010). Branch Lines East of Norwich: The Wherry Lines. Midhurst, West Sussex: Middleton Press. ISBN 978-1-906008-69-7.
- Allen, Cecil J. (1975) [1955]. The Great Eastern Railway. London: Ian Allan. ISBN 0-711006-59-8.
- Awdry, Christopher (1990). Encyclopaedia of British Railway Companies. Sparkford: Patrick Stephens Ltd. ISBN 1-8526-0049-7. OCLC 19514063. CN 8983.
- Baker, Michael H.C. (1990). Railways to the Coast. Wellingborough, Northants: Patrick Stephens. ISBN 1-852600-58-6.
- Beeching, Richard (1963). The Reshaping of British Railways (PDF) (Report). Part I: Report. London: HMSO.
- Body, Geoffrey (1986). Railways of the Eastern Region. Vol. 1. Wellingborough, Northants: Patrick Stephens. ISBN 0-850597-12-9.
- Brodribb, John (2003). An Illustrated History of the East Suffolk Railway. Hersham, Surrey: Oxford Publishing Co. ISBN 0-860935-72-8.
- Brodribb, John (2009). The Main Lines of East Anglia. Hersham, Surrey: Oxford Publishing Co. ISBN 978-0-86093-629-9.
- Butt, R. V. J. (October 1995). The Directory of Railway Stations: details every public and private passenger station, halt, platform and stopping place, past and present (1st ed.). Sparkford: Patrick Stephens Ltd. ISBN 978-1-85260-508-7. OCLC 60251199. OL 11956311M.
- Cooper, John M. (1982). The East Suffolk Railway. Tarrant Hinton, Dorset: The Oakwood Press. ISBN 0-853612-85-4. LP 139.
- Garrod, Trevor (April 1997). England's most easterly railway: 150 years of the Lowestoft-Norwich line. Lowestoft: Railway Development Society (East Anglian Branch). ISBN 0-950946-52-4.
- Gordon, D.I. (1990) [1968]. A Regional History of the Railways of Great Britain: The Eastern Counties. Vol. 5. Newton Abbot, Devon: David St John Thomas. ISBN 978-0-946537-55-6.
- Hawkins, Chris; Reeve, George (1986). Great Eastern Railway Engine Sheds. Vol. 1. Didcot, Oxon: Wild Swan. ISBN 0-906867-40-1.
- Joby, R.S. (1985) [1977]. Forgotten Railways: East Anglia. Vol. 7. Newton Abbot, Devon: David St John Thomas. ISBN 0-946537-25-9.
- Joby, R.S. (1987). Regional Railway Handbooks. Vol. 2. Newton Abbot, Devon: David St John Thomas. ISBN 0-946537-36-4.
- Joby, R.S. (1975) [1970]. The Norfolk & Suffolk Joint Railways Committee. Norwich: Klofron. OL 14612730M.
- Mitchell, Mr (1966–1967). "Railways in and About Lowestoft" (PDF). Lowestoft Archaeological & Local History Society: Annual Report. 1: 5–7.
- Moffat, Hugh (1987). East Anglia's First Railways. Lavenham, Suffolk: Terence Dalton. ISBN 0-861380-38-X.
- Oppitz, Leslie (2003) [1999]. Lost Railways of East Anglia. Newbury, Berkshire: Countryside Books. ISBN 978-1-85306-595-8.
- Quick, Michael (2009) [2001]. Railway passenger stations in Great Britain: a chronology (4th ed.). Oxford: Railway & Canal Historical Society. ISBN 978-0-901461-57-5. OCLC 612226077.
- White, Malcolm R. (2004). Rails to the Coast. Lowestoft: Coastal Publications. ISBN 0-954732-30-8.
- White, Malcolm R. (2003) [2002]. The Lowestoft Train. Lowestoft: Coastal Publications. ISBN 0-953248-56-9.
- Wrottesley, A.J.F. (1970). The Midland & Great Northern Joint Railway. Newton Abbot, Devon: David & Charles. ISBN 0-7153-4340-8.
