= Yarmouth–Lowestoft line =

Former railway line in Norfolk and Suffolk, England

The Yarmouth–Lowestoft line was a railway line which linked the coastal towns of Yarmouth, Gorleston-on-Sea and Lowestoft in the counties of Norfolk and Suffolk, England. It opened on 13 July 1903 as the first direct railway link between the two towns; it was constructed by the Great Eastern Railway and the Midland and Great Northern Railway in the hope of encouraging the development of holiday resorts along the coast. In the event, although the line was built to high standards and considerable cost, intermediate traffic did not develop and competition from buses and trams eroded the little that had been generated.

Fish traffic was carried in large quantities until the 1930s when it fell into decline. In 1953, when major repairs to the Breydon Viaduct were required, it was decided to discontinue through services from the Midland and Great Northern to Lowestoft and to divert London trains to Lowestoft via Norwich Thorpe. After the Midland and Great Northern and Yarmouth–Beccles line closed to passengers in 1959, the Yarmouth–Lowestoft line was upgraded to accommodate the diverted traffic but, after services were switched to Yarmouth Vauxhall in 1962, it was singled and the stations made unstaffed halts. With only a local service running between vandalised stations, the decision was taken to close the route on 4 May 1970 in favour of bus services which were judged to be adequate for most of the year.

== History ==
=== Construction ===
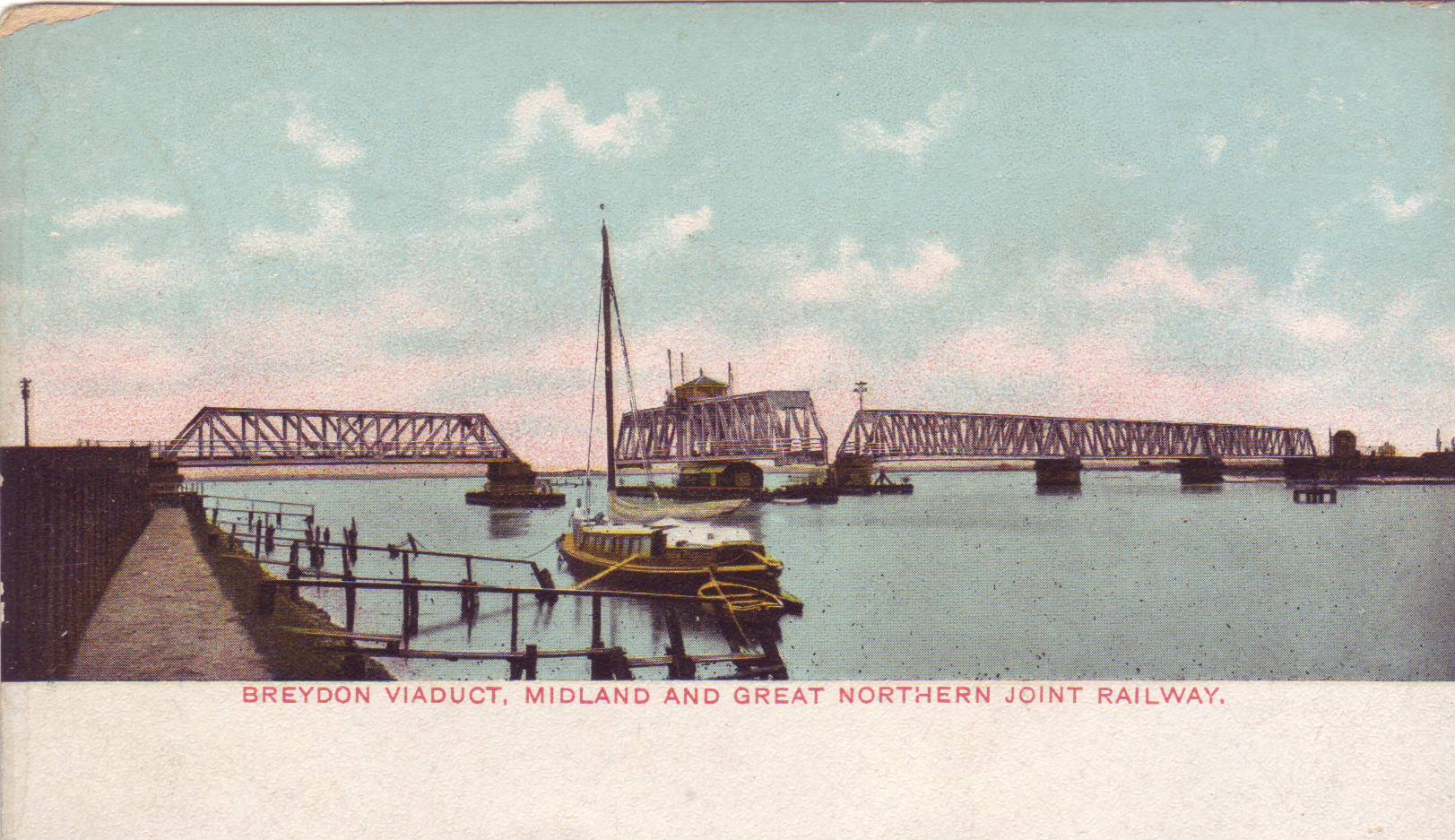
Breydon Viaduct over Breydon Water

The Great Eastern Railway (GER) and the Midland and Great Northern Joint Railway (M&GNR) formed the Norfolk and Suffolk Joint Committee in July 1898, to control projected extensions as a joint railway between Cromer Beach and Mundesley as well as Yarmouth and Lowestoft. The second line would create the first direct coastal link between the Norfolk and Suffolk coastal towns, and the railway companies also hoped that it would stimulate the development of holiday resorts along the coast. It opened on 13 July 1903 and immediately supplanted the more circuitous route between the two towns provided by the Yarmouth–Beccles line via the Haddiscoe East curve and St Olaves station.

As part of the agreement, the GER would build a direct line between Yarmouth and Lowestoft, while the M&GN would construct a link from Caister Road near its Yarmouth Beach terminus across the Wherry Lines and the Beccles line to a junction near Gorleston North station.

The scheme to construct the M&GN link was entitled the Lowestoft Junction Railway and entailed the construction of three viaducts: Breydon Viaduct over Breydon Water, a smaller viaduct across the River Bure and the Vauxhall Viaduct across the GER's East Suffolk line. In total, £159,758-12-4d (equivalent to £18 million in 2025) was spent in constructing 2 miles 11 chains (3.4 km), not taking account of the costs of alterations made to Yarmouth Beach to accommodate the new connection. The track was at first double but became single for the 800 feet (240 m) Breydon Viaduct, now the most important engineering structure on the M&GN, before becoming double again to join the GER curve from Yarmouth South Town station at Gorleston North Junction. The contractors for the line were Oliver & Sons of Rugby and John Wilson from the GER was appointed as engineer.

=== Operations ===
==== Passenger traffic ====
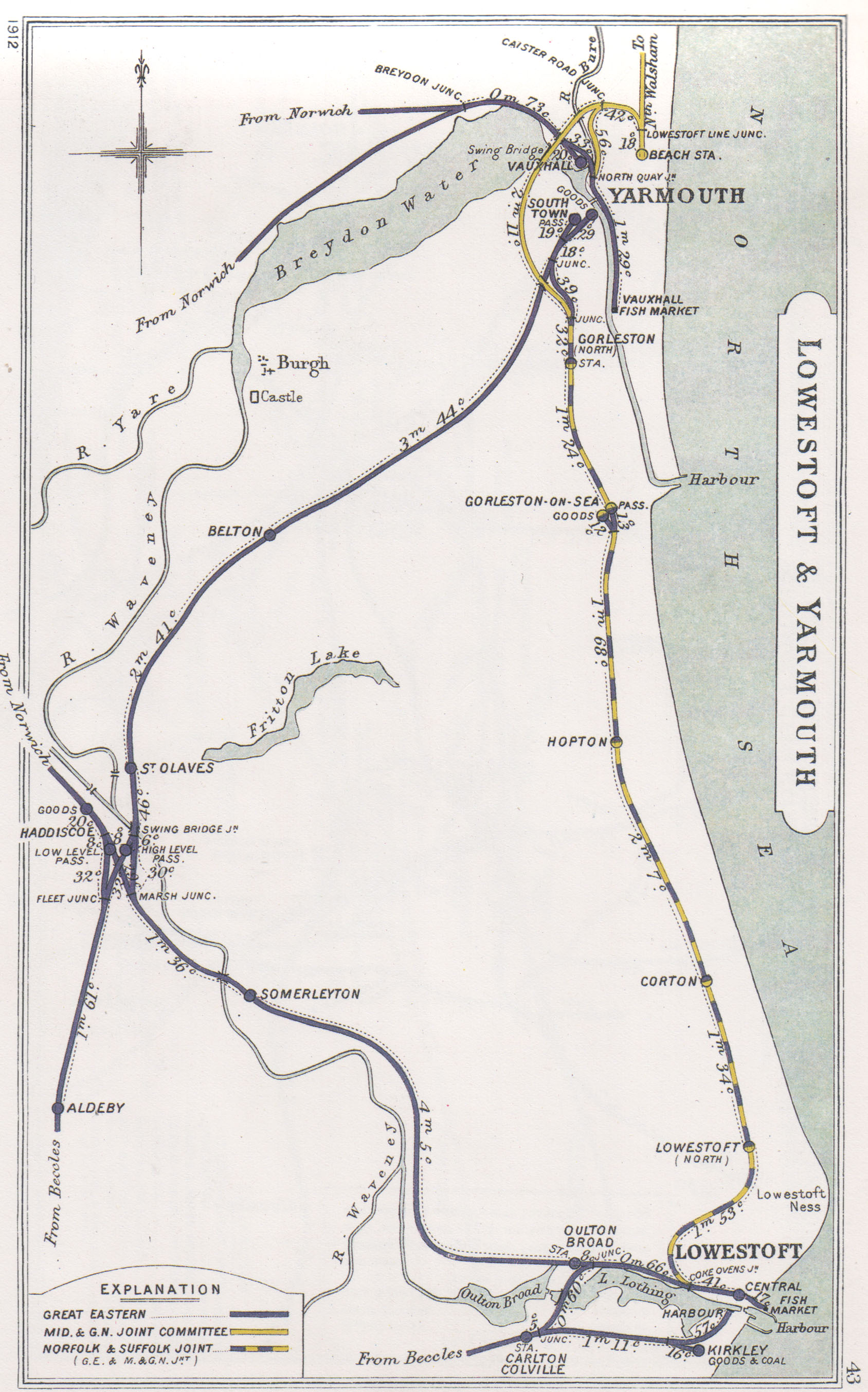
A 1912 Railway Clearing House map showing the coastal section of the Norfolk and Suffolk Joint Railway (in dotted blue/yellow) and connecting lines

As the Joint Committee had no rolling stock of its own, services between Yarmouth and Lowestoft, or either and Beccles, typically consisted of two coaches hauled by a small tank locomotive such as the M&GN 4-4-2Ts. The M&GN initially ran four daily services to and from Lowestoft, while the GER laid on three trains; the M&GN used Yarmouth Beach and the GER used South Town. The GER services were withdrawn during the First World War.

The M&GN also operated two holiday expresses: a morning service to Leicester and Birmingham, and an afternoon one to Derby, Manchester and Liverpool; neither called at Hopton-on-Sea or Corton stations. Consequently, although Gorleston-on-Sea and Gorleston North stations received around 10,000 passengers between them and Lowestoft Central around 25,000 passengers during the pre-First World War period, Hopton and Corton saw little traffic. In fact, Corton station had less than 10,000 passengers during 1911, which corresponded to less than half a passenger for each M&GN stopping service. There were no Sunday passenger services except during the summer, although a Stalham to Yarmouth service in October did run until 1905 for the benefit of daytrippers. Between January 1917 and July 1919, all GER services were withdrawn between Yarmouth South Town and Lowestoft Central as a First World War economy measure.

Although the M&GN remained a joint line after the 1923 railway grouping, it was now operated by the London Midland and Scottish Railway and the London and North Eastern Railway. In the same year, the LMS introduced a new service which connected Liverpool Lime Street and Manchester London Road with Yarmouth and Lowestoft. The journey time between Manchester and Yarmouth was 6 hours 25 minutes. A variety of Great Eastern, Great Northern and Great Central tanks were used to provide a regular but poorly-patronised service.

During the Second World War, single-line working was introduced between Gorleston-on-Sea and Lowestoft North as the other line was needed to store wagons; normal service was restored in March 1948. Gorleston North was so badly damaged by enemy bombing that it was subsequently closed; the station was inconveniently sited in relation to the town and had suffered from bus and tram competition. The post-war timetable gave the line its poorest level of service than at any previous point: four trains ran from South Town and two from Yarmouth Beach.

At this time, a two-coach unit was suitable for most workings except Summer Saturdays. Holiday excursions returned after the war and M&GN services to the East Midlands and Birmingham were popular. The 1951 summer timetable showed 14 trains MON-FRI (6 from Yarmouth Beach, 8 from South Town) and 19 on Saturday (10 from Yarmouth Beach or beyond and 9 from South Town) at irregular times. After the closure of the M&GN and the introduction of diesel multiple units, the Winter 1957-58 timetable showed 15 hourly departures from South Town between 7.29am and 9.29pm, rising to 20 in 1963-64 after the closure of the line to Beccles. By the final winter of 1969–70, this number had fallen to 12.

==== Goods traffic ====
The line did initially deal with substantial goods traffic: nearly 20,000 tons of coal a year and 5,000 tons annually of Lowestoft fish traffic, around 10% of the total generated. Lowestoft North and Gorleston North stations became important coal depots, while potential for new traffic was created by the construction of a sugar beet shoot at Hopton-on-Sea in 1913. In the same year, a new 12-coach spur was installed at Gorleston-on-Sea to accommodate passengers for the Suffolk Show. A new station was opened at Gorleston Links in 1914 to serve the adjacent golf club which paid the costs of construction.

Fish traffic declined during the First World War, but overall goods traffic increased as a result of war requirements and the diversion to rail of traditionally seaborne traffic to Yarmouth, Lynn and Wisbech. The volume of goods carried by rail declined significantly in the post-war period due to agricultural and industrial depression, coupled with the growth of road competition to which the line was vulnerable due to the short distances over which traffic was conveyed.

Between 1923 and 1936, the M&GN provided the goods service over the line which consisted of two or three trains per day together with fish trains. The denationalisation of road transport by the Transport Act 1953 dealt a further blow to goods traffic by facilitating long-distance transportation by motor vehicles.

== Decline and closure ==
Both the M&GN and Norfolk & Suffolk Joint Committee were transferred to the British Transport Commission upon nationalisation in 1948. They were assigned to the Eastern Region of British Railways which corresponded very much to the southern region of the LNER.

Reliance on summer traffic was not enough and a programme of closures and economies was put into action from 1953, with the closure of the first section of the Norfolk and Suffolk between Cromer and Mundesley, followed by the closure of Breydon Viaduct from 21 September due to the costs of maintenance. This resulted in the withdrawal of Lowestoft coaches on the expresses from Leicester, the M&GN freight trains and the ordinary passenger service between Yarmouth Beach and Lowestoft. A service between the coastal towns was maintained from South Town, as was a through service to Lowestoft from Birmingham on Saturdays; the Leicester service was reintroduced the following summer, running from Derby to Gorleston and Lowestoft via the Beccles line.

Passenger services on the M&GN were the next to be withdrawn in February 1959, followed by those on the Yarmouth to Beccles line. This led to the re-routing of London to Yarmouth expresses via Lowestoft where they reversed and ran along the coast to Yarmouth South Town. This avoided the division of trains at Beccles and also provided Gorleston holidaymakers with a direct link to London; it also served the camps and caravan parks at Hopton and Corton.

At this time there were expectations that the line would become the main London to Yarmouth route and in preparation for the additional traffic bridges were strengthened and track improved. However, following improvements to Yarmouth Vauxhall station and dieselisation in 1962, the bulk of the London service was re-routed via Norwich Thorpe and the Wherry Lines. There was still however enough holiday traffic in 1964 to justify nine services to and from South Town from Liverpool Street on Saturdays. This declined in the face of the rationalisations and elimination of surplus rolling stock recommended by the Beeching Report which had the effect of greatly reducing the number of Saturday specials.

From September 1966, the line – which had long been plagued by an imbalance between summer and winter patronage – saw the introduction of diesel sets with conductor guards. In reality, this was no more than a pay train serving weed-infested and vandalised stations. The stations at Gorleston-on-Sea, Hopton, Corton and Lowestoft North were also made unstaffed. In the following year the line was singled and the daily goods pick-up at Lowestoft Central and Yarmouth South Town was discontinued. The last Norfolk and Suffolk signal box at Lowestoft North was also closed, those at Gorleston, Hopton and Corton having already been switched out.

By this time, the line was losing £34,000 a year (equivalent to £540,000 in 2025) and with no through services served only local interests. In the absence of any realistic prospect of traffic improvement, closure came on 4 May 1970. An attempt was made by a local group to purchase the line with a view to running year-round commuter services and summer steam-hauled tourist trains, but this came to nothing.

== Present day ==
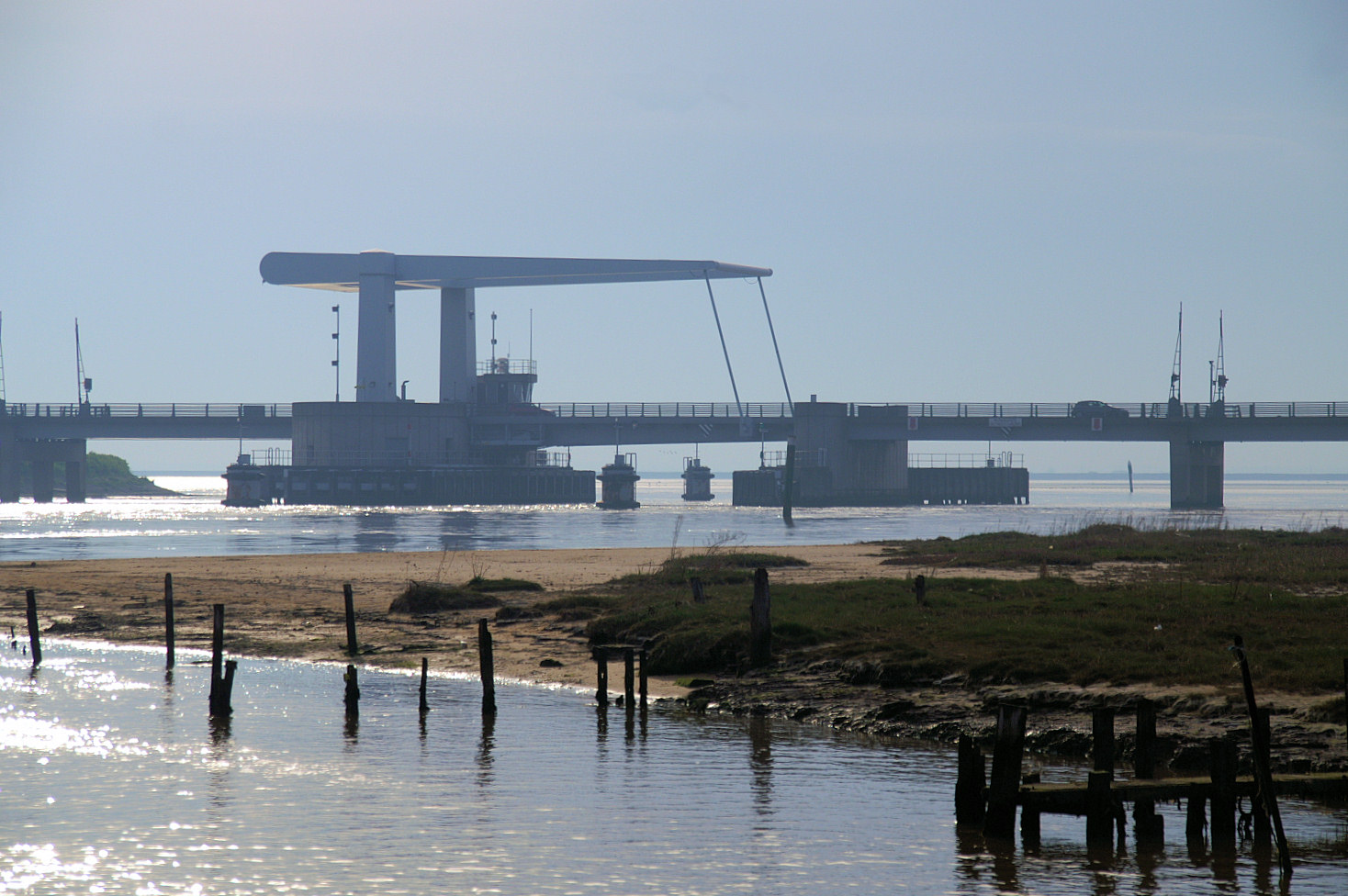
Breydon Road Bridge on the A47 relief road

The site of Yarmouth South Town has disappeared beneath new roads, superstores and industrial units, whilst that of Gorleston-on-Sea was swept away in 1991 to make way for a roundabout on the A47 Gorleston inner relief road.

The road follows the former railway alignment from the bridge at Yarmouth Vauxhall to a point to the south of the former Gorleston station, and includes a new drawbridge near the site of Breydon Viaduct.

The site of Gorleston Links Halt is similarly unrecognisable and has disappeared under residential development.

A housing estate has been built across the track at the site of Hopton-on-Sea station; the stationmaster's house still stands, as do the gates to the goods yard to the right of the house.

Corton is the only former station on the line still standing; it is in use as a private residence, although the platform canopy is very rundown.

Lowestoft North has disappeared under residential development and a road named Beeching Drive occupies the former alignment; to the west, a section of the line has become a non-vehicular right of way.

The absence of a direct rail connection between Great Yarmouth and Lowestoft remains keenly felt today.
