= Yarmouth station =

Yarmouth station may refer to:

- Yarmouth station (Massachusetts), a New York, New Haven & Hartford Railroad station in Yarmouth, Massachusetts
- Yarmouth railway station (Isle of Wight), a former station on the Isle of Wight, England
- Yarmouth Beach railway station, a former station in Norfolk, England
- Yarmouth South Town railway station, a former station in Norfolk, England
- Yarmouth station (Maine), a former Canadian National Railway station

== See also ==
- Admiral of the North, formerly Admiral on the Yarmouth Station (1294-1325)
- Great Yarmouth railway station, formerly Yarmouth Vauxhall, in Norfolk, United Kingdom
