= Gorleston-on-Sea railway station =

Former railway station in Norfolk, England

Coordinates: 52.5699°N 1.7251°E

Gorleston-on-Sea
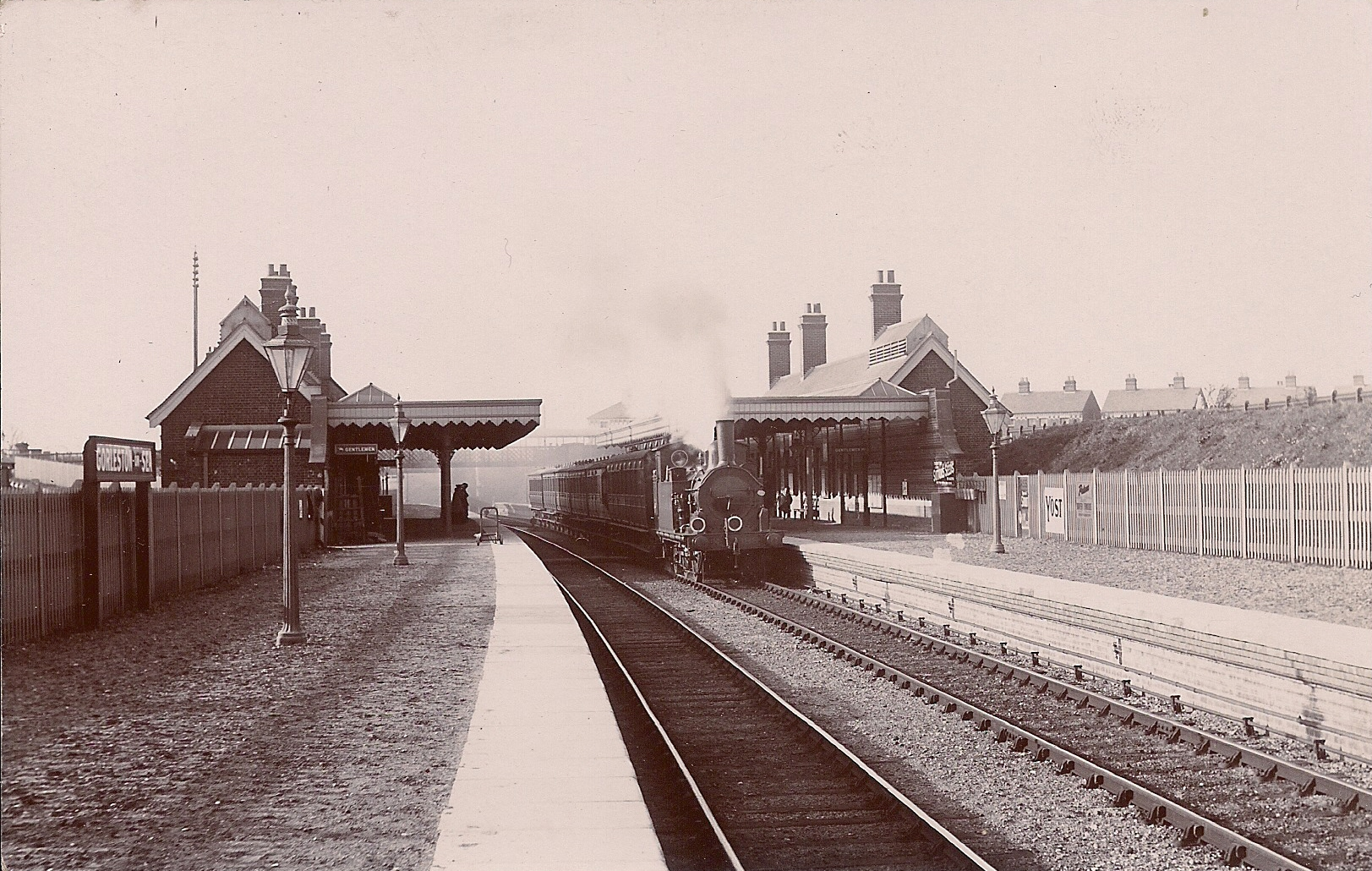

General information
- Location: Gorleston, Great Yarmouth, Norfolk; England
- Grid reference: TG525034
- Platforms: 2 (reduced to 1 in the 1960s)

Other information
- Status: Disused

History
- Original company: Norfolk and Suffolk Joint Railway
- Pre-grouping: Norfolk and Suffolk Joint Railway
- Post-grouping: Norfolk and Suffolk Joint Railway; British Railways

Key dates
- 13 July 1903: Opened
- 3 July 1967: Closed to freight
- 4 May 1970: Closed to passengers
Location

Gorleston-on-Sea railway station served the town of Gorleston-on-Sea in Norfolk, England. It was a stop on the Norfolk and Suffolk Joint Railway's Yarmouth-Lowestoft line that closed in 1970.

== History ==
Built in 1903, the route ran from Lowestoft Central in Suffolk to Yarmouth Beach in Norfolk.

The station buildings included a large brick goods shed, signalbox, footbridge and an extensive coal depot. Following the closure of the Beccles to Yarmouth South Town line to passengers in November 1959, express trains from London Liverpool Street to Great Yarmouth were rerouted via Lowestoft where they reversed, before running along the coast line through Corton, Hopton-on-Sea and Gorleston-on-Sea. However, this diversion did not last long before some of the London trains were again rerouted into Yarmouth Vauxhall.

In 1966, all stations on the line were made into unstaffed halts. In 1968, Wherry Lines claimed that an inquiry into the proposed closure of the line found that it served between five and ten thousand people per week and was running at a loss of £34,000 each year.

By 1970, the route was deemed uneconomic; despite a local effort to keep the line running as a tourist attraction, full closure came on 4 May that year. After a lifespan of almost 57 years, Gorleston-on-Sea station closed along with all other stations on the route except Lowestoft Central.

The station buildings were demolished several years after closure.

Preceding station	Disused railways	Following station
Gorleston North	Norfolk and Suffolk; Yarmouth-Lowestoft Line	Gorleston Links

== The site today ==
There are now no traces of the station, as the site is now occupied by the A47 by-pass road.
