= Gorleston North railway station =

Railway station in Gorleston, Norfolk, England

Coordinates: 52.5878°N 1.7193°E

Gorleston North

General information
- Location: Gorleston, Great Yarmouth, Norfolk; England
- Grid reference: TG520054
- Platforms: 2

Other information
- Status: Disused

History
- Original company: Norfolk and Suffolk Joint Railway
- Pre-grouping: Norfolk and Suffolk Joint Railway
- Post-grouping: Norfolk and Suffolk Joint Railway

Key dates
- 13 July 1903: Opened
- 5 October 1942: Closed
Location

Gorleston North railway station was a former station on the Norfolk and Suffolk Joint Railway connecting Great Yarmouth with Lowestoft. It was located on the northern outskirts of Gorleston-on-Sea, close to Great Yarmouth. Gorleston North was closed during the Second World War following bomb damage. Trains continued to pass through the station until services were withdrawn from the line in 1970. The station was demolished after closure and the site is now occupied by the A47 road.

Former Services

Preceding station	Disused railways	Following station
Yarmouth South Town	Norfolk and Suffolk; Yarmouth-Lowestoft Line; 1903-1970	Gorleston-on-Sea
