= Corton railway station =

Former railway station in Suffolk, England

Coordinates: 52.5123°N 1.7425°E

Corton
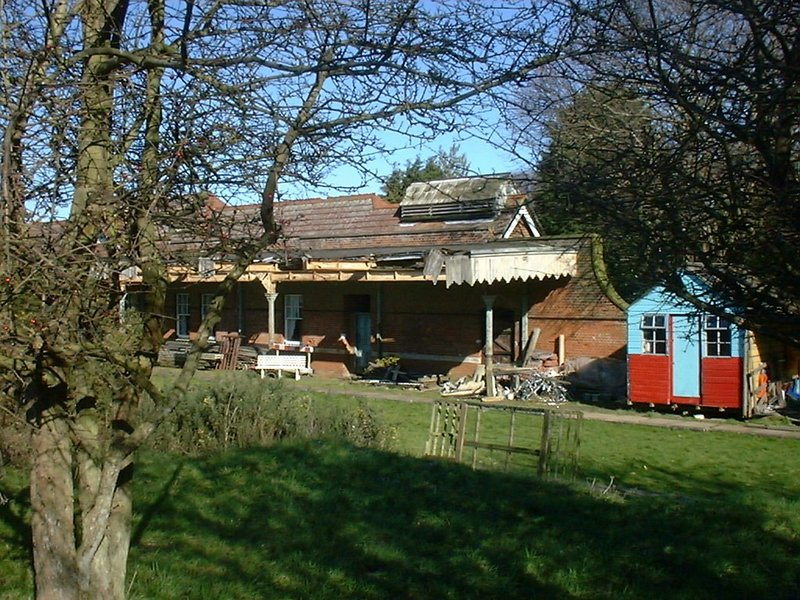

General information
- Location: Corton, East Suffolk; England
- Grid reference: TM539970
- Platforms: 2

Other information
- Status: Disused

History
- Original company: Norfolk and Suffolk Joint Railway
- Pre-grouping: Norfolk and Suffolk Joint Railway
- Post-grouping: Norfolk and Suffolk Joint Railway; British Railways

Key dates
- 13 July 1903: Opened
- 13 July 1964: Closed to freight
- 4 May 1970: Closed to passengers
Location

Corton railway station served the village of Corton, in Suffolk, England. It was a stop on the Norfolk and Suffolk Joint Railway line between Yarmouth Beach and Lowestoft Central.

== History ==
The station opened on 13 July 1903.

The station was host to a LNER camping coach from 1935 to 1939 and may have had a coach visiting in 1935. A coach was also positioned here by Eastern Region of British Railways from 1952 to 1954, then there were two coaches until the end of the 1960 season. These were replaced in 1961 by a Pullman camping coach which was joined by another Pullman in 1962, until all camping coaches in the region were withdrawn at the end of the 1965 season.

The station closed, along with the rest of the line, on 4 May 1970.

Preceding station	Disused railways	Following station
Hopton-on-Sea	Norfolk and Suffolk; Yarmouth-Lowestoft Line; 1903-1970	Lowestoft North

== The site today ==
Corton is the only station building, apart from Lowestoft Central, remaining on the route of the line. It is currently in use as a private residence; the trackbed has been filled to platform level and, while the canopy is still in existence, it is looking very run down and forlorn.
