= Hopton-on-Sea railway station =

Former railway station in Norfolk, England

Coordinates: 52.541°N 1.727°E

Hopton-on-Sea

General information
- Location: Hopton-on-Sea, Great Yarmouth, Norfolk; England
- Grid reference: TG526000
- Platforms: 2 (1 from mid-1960s)

Other information
- Status: Disused

History
- Original company: Norfolk and Suffolk Joint Railway
- Pre-grouping: Norfolk and Suffolk Joint Railway
- Post-grouping: Norfolk and Suffolk Joint Railway; British Railways

Key dates
- 13 July 1903: Opened as Hopton
- 18 July 1932: Renamed as Hopton-on-Sea
- 13 July 1964: Closed to freight
- 4 May 1970: Closed to passengers
Location

Hopton-on-Sea was a railway station serving the village of Hopton-on-Sea, in Norfolk, England. It was a stop on the Norfolk and Suffolk Joint Railway line between Yarmouth Beach and Lowestoft. It opened in 1903 and closed in 1970.

== History ==
The station opened as Hopton on 13 July 1903 and was renamed to Hopton-on-Sea on 18 July 1932.

From 1935 to 1939, and possibly for some of 1934, Hopton had a static LNER camping coach in a siding; it was used as accommodation for holidaymakers. A coach was also positioned here by Eastern Region of British Railways from 1952 to 1954, and two coaches until the end of the 1960 season. These were replaced in 1961 by two Pullman camping coaches, until all camping coaches in the region were withdrawn at the end of the 1965 season.

In the 1960s, the station was destaffed and the line was reduced from double track to single track. It was closed on 4 May 1970, along with the rest of the line.

After closure, the station was demolished; the embankments and infrastructure were removed and the site was redeveloped with housing.

Preceding station	Disused railways	Following station
Gorleston Links	Norfolk and Suffolk; Yarmouth-Lowestoft Line; 1903-1970	Corton

== The site today ==
There are few traces of the railway's existence; only the former stationmaster's house remains, which is now a private residence named Station House. The road that served the station is still called Station Road.
