= Aldeby railway station =

Disused railway station in Aldeby, Norfolk

Aldeby
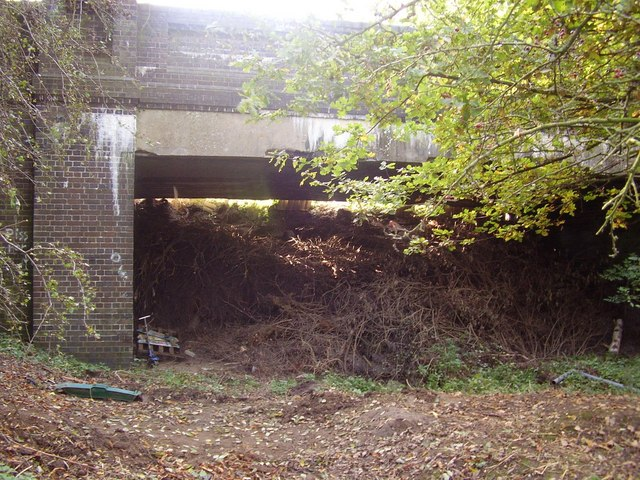
- Remains of Aldeby station in 2007

General information
- Location: Aldeby, South Norfolk; England
- Coordinates: 52.498019°N 1.606133°E
- Grid reference: TM448950
- Platforms: 2

Other information
- Status: Disused

History
- Original company: East Suffolk Railway
- Pre-grouping: Great Eastern Railway
- Post-grouping: London and North Eastern Railway; Eastern Region of British Railways

Key dates
- 4 December 1854: Opened
- 15 May 1858: Closed
- 1 June 1859: reopened
- 2 November 1959: Closed to passengers
- 28 December 1964: Closed to freight
Location

Aldeby railway station was a station in Aldeby, in the English county of Norfolk. It was on the line between Great Yarmouth and Beccles; the station was opened in 1854 when the line from Ipswich to Beccles was extended northwards. It was closed in 1959.

== History ==
Opened by the East Suffolk Railway, it subsequently joined the Great Eastern Railway, it became part of the London and North Eastern Railway during the Grouping of 1923. The line then passed on to the Eastern Region of British Railways on nationalisation in 1948. It was then closed by the British Transport Commission.

Former Services

Preceding station	Disused railways	Following station
Haddiscoe High Level	Great Eastern; Yarmouth-Beccles Line; 1859-1959	Beccles

== Present day ==
The former railway bridge is still visible on Station Road. There is a large building on the station site and the former course of the railway can be tracked through the fields. As of 2008, the goods yard is now a used car dealership and scrap yard, and as previously noted has several large buildings on the site. The station house is mainly unchanged in outward appearance but is now a private house.
