= The Easterling =

UK passenger train service

The Easterling was an express passenger train from London Liverpool Street with sections for Lowestoft on the coast of Suffolk and Yarmouth South Town on the Norfolk coast, dividing at Beccles, the only intermediate stop. Introduced by British Railways in 1950, it was relatively short lived and ceased to run in September 1958.

The name has been revived for heritage railtours.
