= Belton and Burgh railway station =

Disused railway station in Norfolk, England

Coordinates: 52.56564°N 1.65495°E

Belton & Burgh
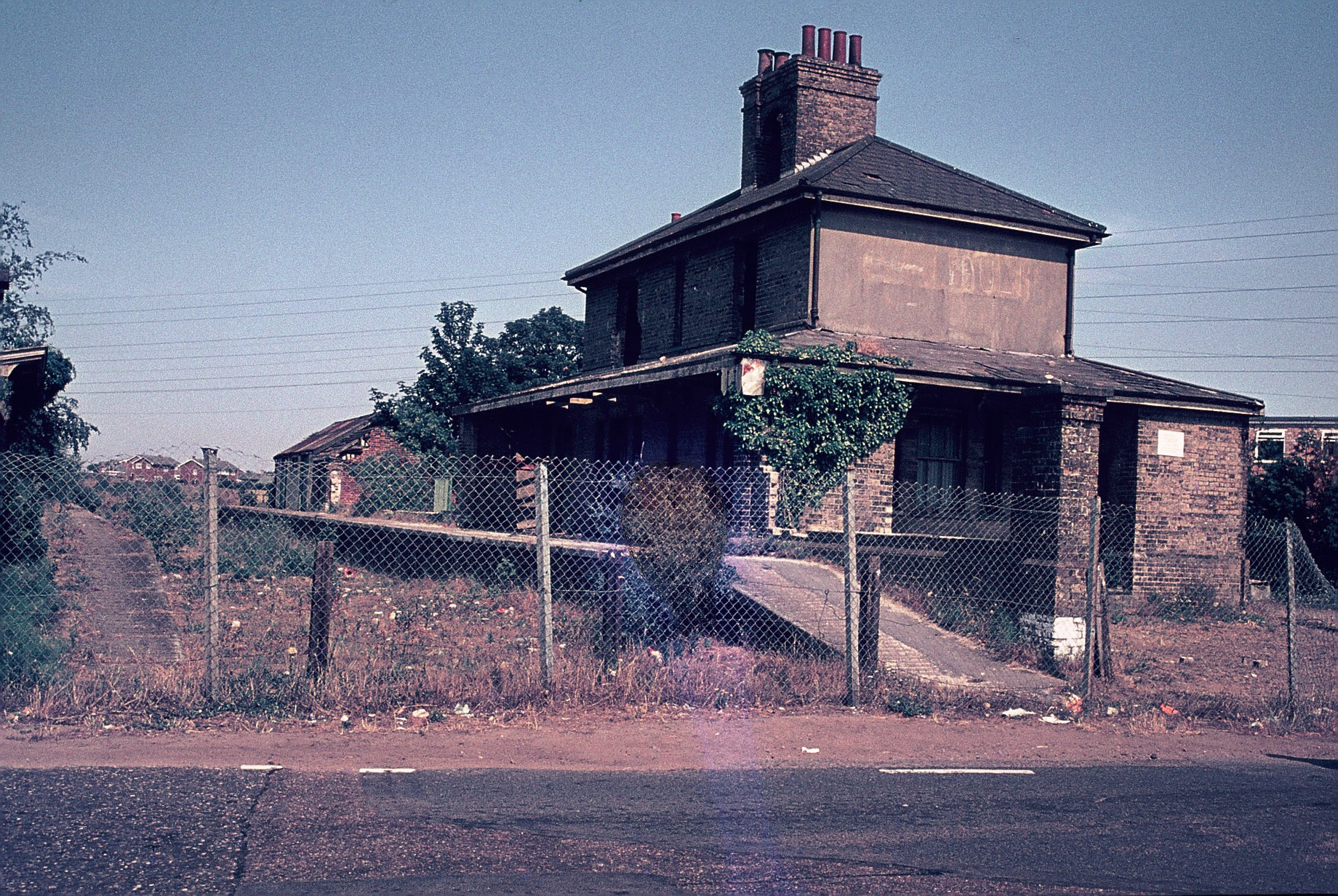
- The station building in the 1970s

General information
- Location: Belton with Browston, Great Yarmouth; England
- Grid reference: TG478027
- Platforms: 2

Other information
- Status: Disused

History
- Pre-grouping: Eastern Counties Railway; Great Eastern Railway
- Post-grouping: London and North Eastern Railway; Eastern Region of British Railways

Key dates
- 1 June 1859: Opened as Belton
- 1 July 1923: Renamed Belton and Burgh
- 2 November 1959: Closed
Location

Belton & Burgh (originally Belton) was a railway station serving the Norfolk villages of Belton and Burgh Castle. It once saw trains on the main line from Yarmouth South Town to London, but was closed in 1959 as part of a major re-evaluation of the British Railways network. It was on a connecting branch between Great Yarmouth and Beccles.

The site of the station can still be located. It is now a modern house where Station Road South meets Station Road North. A notable bump in the road signifies where the track once crossed. The station was on the left, travelling north to south, with the house having a "Platform 3" sign hanging by the driveway. On the right, an access road to a camp site is on the old track bed heading towards St. Olaves.

Former Services

Preceding station	Disused railways	Following station
Yarmouth South Town	Great Eastern; Yarmouth-Beccles Line; 1859-1959	St Olaves
