= Gorleston Links railway station =

Former railway station in Norfolk, England

Coordinates: 52.5566°N 1.7256°E

Gorleston Links

General information
- Location: Gorleston, Great Yarmouth, Norfolk; England
- Grid reference: TG525019
- Platforms: 2 (1 from mid-1960s)

Other information
- Status: Disused

History
- Original company: Norfolk and Suffolk Joint Railway
- Pre-grouping: Norfolk and Suffolk Joint Railway
- Post-grouping: Norfolk and Suffolk Joint Railway; British Railways

Key dates
- July 1914: Opened as Gorleston Links Halt
- May 1918: Closed
- 11 August 1919: Reopened
- 6 May 1968: Renamed Gorleston Links
- 4 May 1970: Closed
Location

Gorleston Links was a railway station in Gorleston, Norfolk, England; it was a stop on the Norfolk and Suffolk Joint Railway's Yarmouth-Lowestoft line. It was located on an embankment to the north of Links Road and to the south-west of the end of Hill Avenue; the tracks southward crossed Links Road by bridge.

== History ==
Gorleston Links was opened in July 1914 to serve the adjacent golf course. The station was closed four years later as a post-war economy measure, but later reopened in August 1919; this time as a result of the increasing number of holidaymakers visiting the area. Initially named Gorleston Links Halt, the station was renamed just Gorleston Links in 1968, only two years before its eventual closure.

The route of the railway line south of Gorleston Links ran almost parallel with the A12 Lowestoft Road to Station Road at Hopton railway station.

Preceding station	Disused railways	Following station
Gorleston-on-Sea	Norfolk and Suffolk; Yarmouth-Lowestoft Line; 1903-1970	Hopton-on-Sea

== The site today ==
The area where the station was situated has changed greatly in the years since 1970; residential redevelopment has led to the removal of the bridge and embankment, leaving no trace of the former halt.
