= Yarmouth South Town railway station =

Former railway station in Norfolk, England

Coordinates: 52.6050°N 1.7197°E

Yarmouth South Town
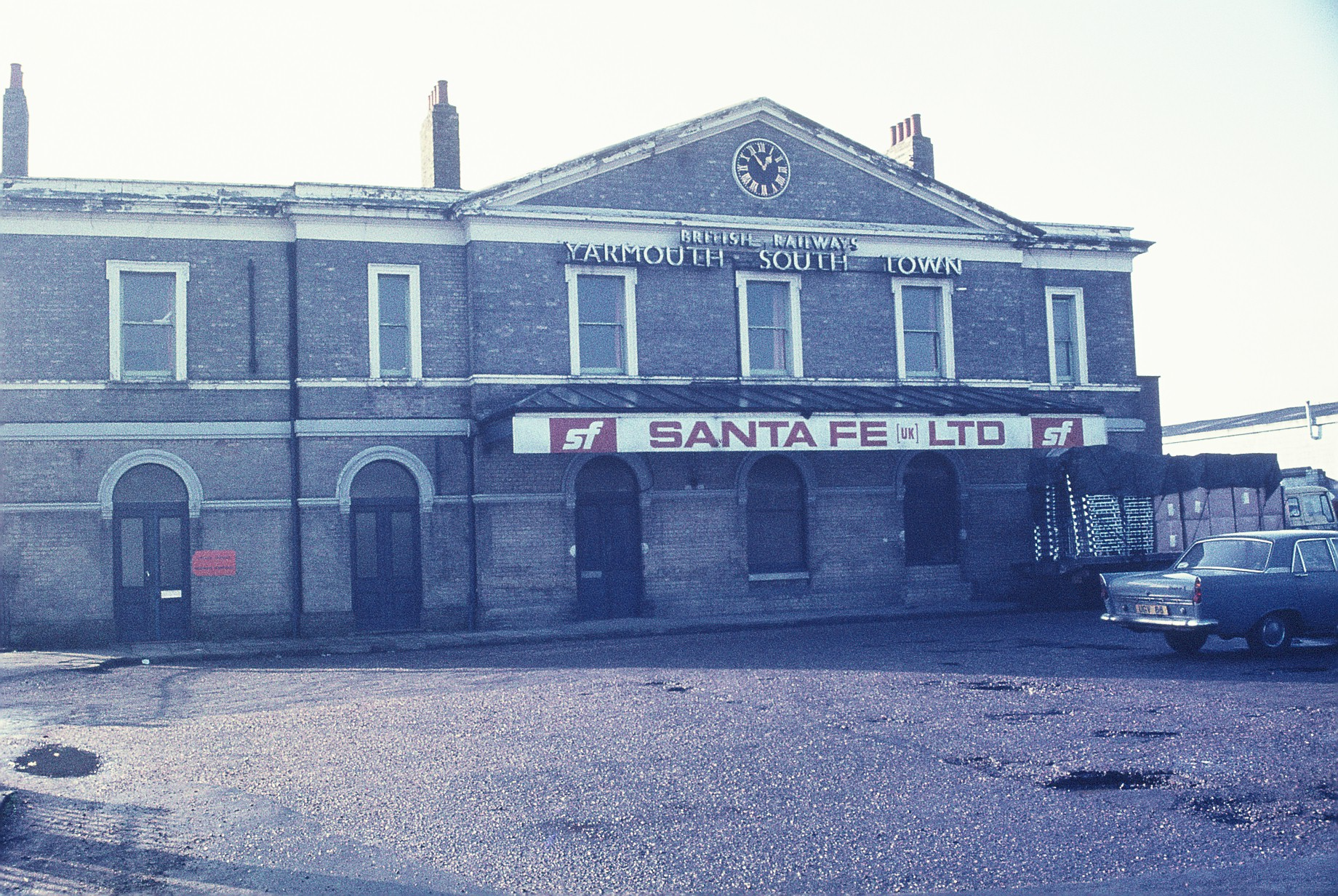
- The station frontage in 1975.

General information
- Location: Great Yarmouth, Borough of Great Yarmouth, England
- Grid reference: TG520073
- Platforms: 4

Other information
- Status: Disused

History
- Original company: East Suffolk Railway
- Pre-grouping: Great Eastern Railway
- Post-grouping: London and North Eastern Railway, Eastern Region of British Railways

Key dates
- 1 June 1859: Opened
- 6 November 1967: Closed to freight
- 4 May 1970: Closed to passengers
Location

Yarmouth South Town, sometimes known as Yarmouth Southtown, was a railway station in Great Yarmouth, Norfolk, England. It was one of three stations in the town; the others being Yarmouth Vauxhall and Yarmouth Beach, of which only the former remains in operation.

== Description ==
The station had four platforms, linked together at the east end by a generously sized circulation area. The main station building was built in the Italianate style and other buildings were located along platform 1. There was a goods yard, a coal yard, a cattle market and timber yard. The railway was extended eastwards along the back of platform 1 to the quayside area, with this area being shunted by horses or tractors as locomotives were forbidden to cross the road (now the A12) by the original 1856 act. This area contained a tightly spaced network of sidings linked by wagon turntables. As well as a traffic from the quayside, there was a sawmill, corn mill and an icehouse all served by rail.

The station had small two-road engine shed located south of the station area, with a turntable, coaling and watering facilities. Some repair work was carried out here, despite the rudimentary facilities. The shed closed in November 1959, along with the line to Beccles.

== History ==
=== Opening and early years ===
Yarmouth South Town station was the northern end of the East Suffolk Line, which opened on 1 June 1859 and connected the station with Ipswich. From its opening, the line was operated by the Eastern Counties Railway (ECR) although the East Suffolk Railway continued to exist until 1862.

By the 1860s, the railways in East Anglia were in financial trouble and most were leased to the Eastern Counties Railway. They wished to amalgamate formally, but could not obtain government agreement for this until 1862, when the Great Eastern Railway (GER) was formed by amalgamation.

During this period of operation, there were express services to London Liverpool Street (generally calling at Beccles, where carriages from Lowestoft were added) and then other main stations and an all-stations service to Beccles and Halesworth.

In 1872, the addition of a curve at Haddiscoe High Level allowed a direct all stations service to run to Lowestoft.

At the beginning of the 20th century, a line was built from Yarmouth South Town to Lowestoft, via Gorleston, and opened in 1903. The Norfolk and Suffolk Joint Railway was owned jointly by the Great Eastern Railway and Midland & Great Northern Railway, and served intermediate stations. Its primary function was to aid the development of the area as a resort although it also offered a more direct route from Lowestoft. There was also a link line which linked this line to Yarmouth Beach to facilitate traffic between the two systems; this crossed the East Suffolk route just south of Yarmouth South Town.

Despite the opening of the new railway and more services to Lowestoft, the service via Haddiscoe still operated. In November 1914, the original 45-foot turntable was replaced by a 65-foot turntable, allowing more powerful steam locomotives in the form of the GER Class S69 4-6-0 to operate the express services to and from London Liverpool Street.

During the First World War, reduced passenger services operated to and from South Town.

=== London and North Eastern Railway (1923-1947) ===
On 1 January 1923, the railways in Great Britain were amalgamated into four companies and the GER became part of the London and North Eastern Railway.

A 500 kg bomb fell on the station on 7 May 1942, but failed to explode. A naval bomb disposal officer, who had been at the station waiting for his train, promptly defused the bomb. The station signal box was also damaged in 1942 and was replaced the following year by a new structure.

=== British Railways (1948-1965) ===
Following nationalisation of the railways, the station was operated by the Eastern Region of British Railways. The nationalisation era started brightly for the station, with a dedicated named service - the Easterling - commencing operation on 4 July 1950. The station was, by this time, looking quite woebegone so a modernisation programme to improve it was started in 1952. Work included replacing the entrance canopy, cutting back and reroofing the train shed, installation of new platform canopies, a new refreshment room and a new booking office.

The station was closed for three weeks, following the North Sea floods of 31 January 1953, when the platforms and engine sheds were flooded to a depth of four feet. A signalman was marooned for 21 hours until rescued by boat. When the shed was cleared, the carcasses of 49 pigs, two calves and countless chickens, along with timber from the nearby timber yard and other flood-related detritus, were discovered.

On 21 September 1953, the line that linked Gorleston with Yarmouth Beach station was closed; from that point, all Lowestoft trains terminated at South Town rather than continuing to Beach station.

As early as 1955, the British Transport Commission had identified the line north of Beccles to Great Yarmouth as a candidate for closure, with all trains being diverted via Lowestoft. One of the reasons for this was that there were a number of swing bridges on the route that were expensive to maintain and there was a parallel route via Gorleston.

For some years in the late 1950s, Bird's Eye sent out food in containerised wagons from the station goods yard.

The line to Beccles closed on 2 November 1959 and all services between Lowestoft and Great Yarmouth operated over the later 1903 line. Expresses still served the station but, from 18 June 1962, these were diverted to Yarmouth Vauxhall.

Preceding station	Disused railways	Following station
Terminus	Norfolk and Suffolk; Yarmouth-Lowestoft Line; 1903-1970	Gorleston North
Terminus	Great Eastern Railway; Yarmouth-Beccles Line; 1859-1959	Belton and Burgh

=== Closure ===
The station was recommended for closure under the Beeching Axe. In the mid-1960s, it became unstaffed and its four platforms reduced to one operational platform (the former platform 4). Freight facilities were withdrawn from the quayside area on 6 January 1967 and completely on 6 November 1967.

The station was eventually closed on 4 May 1970, with the last departure being an all-stations service to Lowestoft.

== The site today ==
The old station was used as the headquarters of an oil company, before being demolished in the 1980s to make way for the A1243 Pasteur Road. The A1243/A47 follows the route of the railway until just past the site of Gorleston station. Several retail outlets now occupy the site of the old yards.

No trace of the station remains, although an ice house in the goods yard survives; it has been restored and is Grade II listed.

A bench from the station, bearing the station's name, is on display at the National Railway Museum in York.
