= Yarmouth–Beccles line =

Coordinates: 52.5296°N 1.6263°E

The Yarmouth–Beccles line was a railway line which linked the Suffolk market town of Beccles with the Norfolk coastal resort of Yarmouth. Forming part of the East Suffolk Railway, the line was opened in 1859 and closed 100 years later in 1959.

== History ==
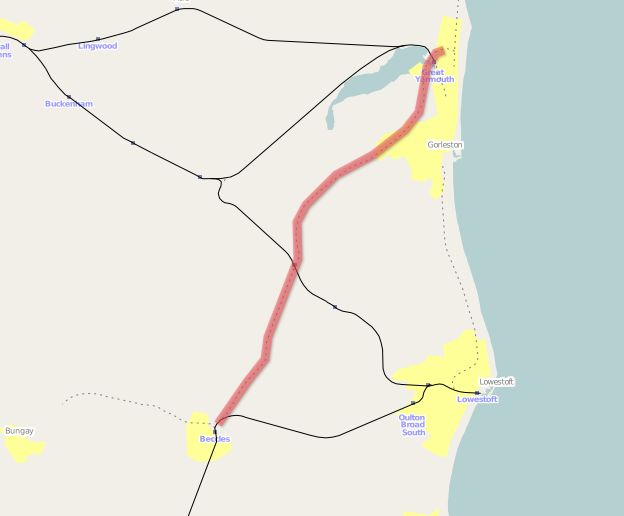
The line between Yarmouth and Beccles

The Halesworth, Beccles and Haddiscoe Railway was formed in 1851 to connect the river ports of Halesworth and Beccles. The scheme was promoted by Samuel Morton Peto who saw the opportunity to raise the status of Lowestoft by constructing a line which would give the town more direct access to London than the existing route via Norwich which he had also sponsored. On 20 November 1854, a single track line between Aldeby and Halesworth opened to goods traffic, and then to passengers on 4 December. Worked by the Eastern Counties Railway, the line – now known as the East Suffolk Railway – connected with the Norwich route at Haddiscoe. Authorisation was obtained for an extension of the line north-east to Yarmouth and this was constructed by the newly formed Yarmouth and Haddiscoe Railway. This opened on 1 June 1859 at the same time as other sections of the East Suffolk Railway between Woodbridge and Ipswich and Beccles to Lowestoft. In 1862, the Eastern Counties Railway was amalgamated into the Great Eastern Railway.

The main feature of the line was the pair of swing bridges over the River Waveney, the first at Beccles and the second between Haddiscoe and St Olaves. These were crossed at walking pace and were, until 1927, operated by signal boxes, with pilotmen on the footplate for the crossing. The initial service provided was praised by local newspapers for its punctuality and spacious coaches. The line's main revenue came from holiday traffic and by 1883, there were seven or eight daily services, with two or three London services in each direction. A curve installed at Haddiscoe in 1872 allowed through services between Yarmouth and Lowestoft via St Olaves, but the route was only a little less circuitous than the original route via Lowestoft, Somerleyton and the Reedham East Curve, entering Yarmouth Vauxhall via Berney Arms. Expresses from Liverpool Street covered the distance to Yarmouth in 2.5 hours in 1904, when regular summer services ferried passengers to the coastal resorts.

Summer Saturday traffic began declining from 1918 as fitted freight stock and diesel power led to increased speeds and capacity which made the longer route to Yarmouth via Lowestoft a viable alternative to the Beccles line. By 1934 the Haddiscoe curve had closed and was lifted early in 1939. The line had passed under the control of the London and North Eastern Railway on 1 January 1923 following the railway grouping and subsequently became part of the Eastern Region of British Railways upon nationalisation on 1 January 1948. Save for the introduction of interlocking signalling, the line saw few modifications during the 86-year period of GER and LNER ownership. The cost of maintaining the Yarmouth to Beccles line to express standards for the benefit of holiday traffic became prohibitive, especially once Breydon Viaduct connecting Yarmouth Beach with Yarmouth South Town closed in 1953 which led to the direct line between Yarmouth and Lowestoft becoming underused. Reports of the line's closure surfaced in 1955, yet it was not until 2 November 1959 that the Beccles line finally closed to regular traffic. Short stretches from Haddiscoe to Aldeby remained open until after the 1964-65 sugar beet season and services to and from Lowestoft continued to use Yarmouth South Town until 1970.

== Present day ==
Belton and Burgh and St Olaves stations have been lost to residential redevelopment, but the St Olaves station sign may still be seen on the wall of a local petrol station. Until a few years ago the one-time St Olaves stationmaster Eddie Stimpson occupied one of the bungalows constructed on the station site. Haddiscoe station still remains open for services on the Wherry Lines and the remains of Haddiscoe High Level may be still be found on an embankment close to where the Beccles line crossed over the Wherry Lines. The signal box has been converted and extended into a private residence. From the station site, the remains of the buttresses which supported St Olaves swing bridge may still be seen. No trace remains of Yarmouth South Town which has disappeared beneath new roads, superstores and industrial units.

== Sources ==
- Adderson, Richard; Saunders, Des G. (1992). British Railways Past & Present: East Anglia (No. 12). Kettering, Northants: Past & Present Publishing Ltd. ISBN 978-1-85895-056-3.
- Adderson, Richard; Kenworthy, Graham (September 2001). Saxmundham to Yarmouth. Midhurst, West Sussex: Middleton Press. ISBN 978-1-901706-69-7.
- Gordon, D.I. (1990). A Regional History of the Railways of Great Britain: The Eastern Counties (Volume 5). Newton Abbot, Devon: David St John Thomas. ISBN 978-0-946537-55-6.
- Joby, R.S. (1985). Forgotten Railways: East Anglia (Vol. 7). Newton Abbot, Devon: David St John Thomas. ISBN 0-946537-25-9.
- Oppitz, Leslie (1999). Lost Railways of East Anglia. Newbury, Berks: Countryside Books. ISBN 978-1-85306-595-8.
