= Haddiscoe High Level railway station =

Former railway station in England

Coordinates: 52.5276°N 1.6246°E

Haddiscoe High Level
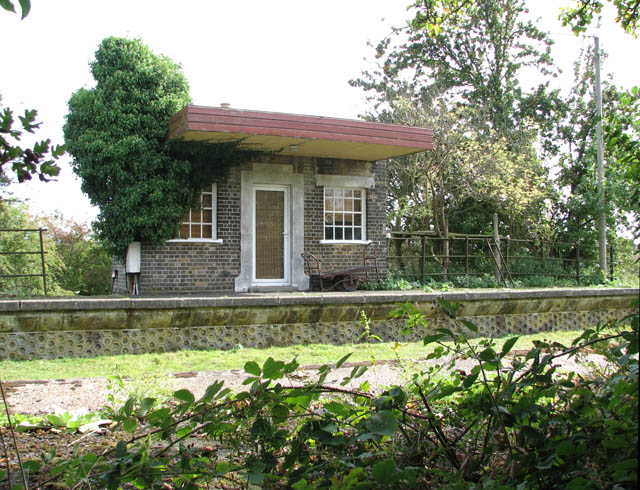

General information
- Location: Haddiscoe, South Norfolk; England
- Grid reference: TM459983
- Platforms: 2

Other information
- Status: Disused

History
- Original company: East Suffolk Railway
- Pre-grouping: Great Eastern Railway
- Post-grouping: London and North Eastern Railway; Eastern Region of British Railways

Key dates
- 1 June 1859: Opened (St Olaves Junction)
- 1 November 1891: Renamed (Herringfleet Junction)
- 9 May 1904: Renamed (Haddiscoe High Level)
- 2 November 1959: Closed
Location

Haddiscoe High Level was a railway station in Haddiscoe, Norfolk serving the now closed Yarmouth-Beccles Line. It obtained its name due to its close proximity to Haddiscoe railway station which served the Wherry Lines. The station was closed in 1959 at the same time as the line it served. The main building is now a five-bedroom house, and the old waiting room has been turned into holiday accommodation.

Former Services

Preceding station	Disused railways	Following station
St Olaves	Great Eastern Railway; Yarmouth-Beccles Line; 1859-1959	Aldeby
