= St Olaves railway station =

Former railway station in England

Coordinates: 52.5368°N 1.6253°E

St Olaves
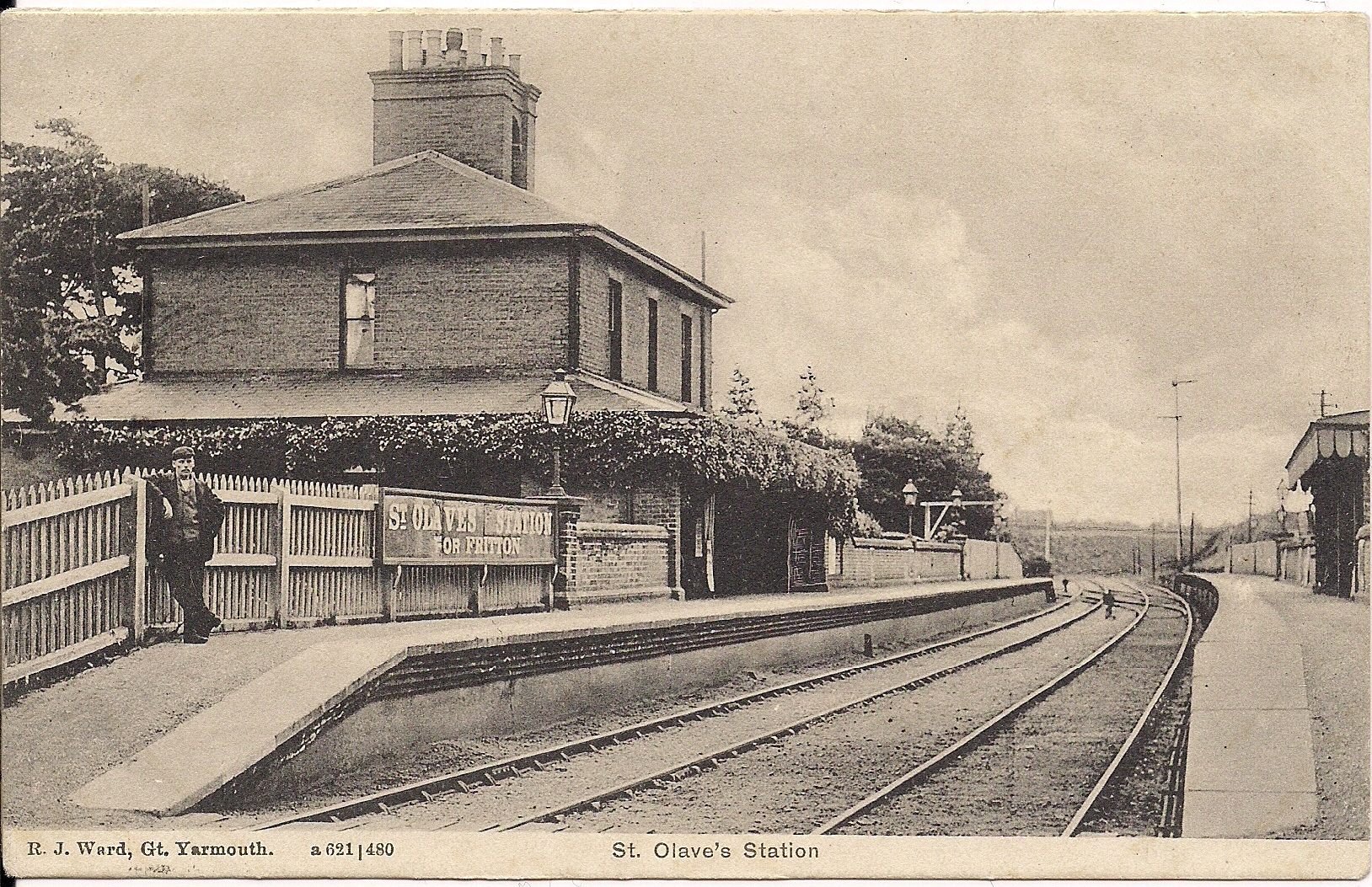

General information
- Location: St. Olaves, Great Yarmouth, Norfolk; England
- Grid reference: TM459993
- Platforms: 2

Other information
- Status: Disused

History
- Pre-grouping: East Suffolk Railway; Great Eastern Railway
- Post-grouping: London and North Eastern Railway; Eastern Region of British Railways

Key dates
- 1 June 1859: Opened
- 2 November 1959: Closed
Location

St Olaves was a station in St. Olaves. It was on the Great Eastern Railway between Great Yarmouth and London. It was first opened in June 1859. After just over a century it was closed in November 1959 when the connection it stood on was cut, and services transferred to another route to make roughly the same journey. Today St Olaves is most closely served by Haddiscoe railway station, which is over the two rivers which separate the two villages.

Former Services

| Preceding station | Disused railways | Following station |
|---|---|---|
| Belton & Burgh | Great Eastern Railway; Yarmouth-Beccles Line; 1859-1959 | Haddiscoe High Level |

== Station Today ==
A clear line on a map can still be seen travelling through Waveney Forest, through Wild Duck camp site and meeting with the old Belton Station. On ground, a lot of the track bank is still there, as well as a small bridge in the Forest. After that, the track would have come over a bridge (To which the piles are still in the ground). There is a house where the platforms and bridge are called 'CuttBride Cottage'
