= Norfolk and Suffolk Joint Railway =

UK railway line

Great Eastern Railway and Midland and Great Northern Railways Joint Committee Act 1898
- Act of Parliament
- Parliament of the United Kingdom
- Long title: An Act for confirming and giving effect to certain Heads of Agreement between the Great Eastern Railway Company and the Midland and Great Northern Railways Joint Committee and for other purposes.
- Citation: 61 & 62 Vict. c. cxx

Dates
- Royal assent: 25 July 1898

Text of statute as originally enacted

The Norfolk and Suffolk Joint Railway (NSJR) was a British joint railway company.

The NSJR was owned by the Great Eastern Railway (GER) and the Midland and Great Northern Joint Railway (MGNJ) and consisted of two distinct sections: a line between North Walsham and Cromer via Mundesley, and a coastal section running from Gorleston to Lowestoft. Neither has survived apart from a 1.5 miles (2.4 km) stretch just south of Cromer which forms part of today's Bittern Line.

Whilst the GER was a constituent company of the London and North Eastern Railway (LNER), the MGNJ interest became jointly held by the LNER and London, Midland and Scottish Railway (LMS), and the railway retained its identity at the 1923 Grouping; in the Third Schedule of the Transport Act 1947, the LNER, LMS, MGNJ and NSJR are all listed among the bodies whose undertakings are to be transferred to the British Transport Commission on 1 January 1948, it thus became part of British Railways.

== North Walsham to Cromer ==
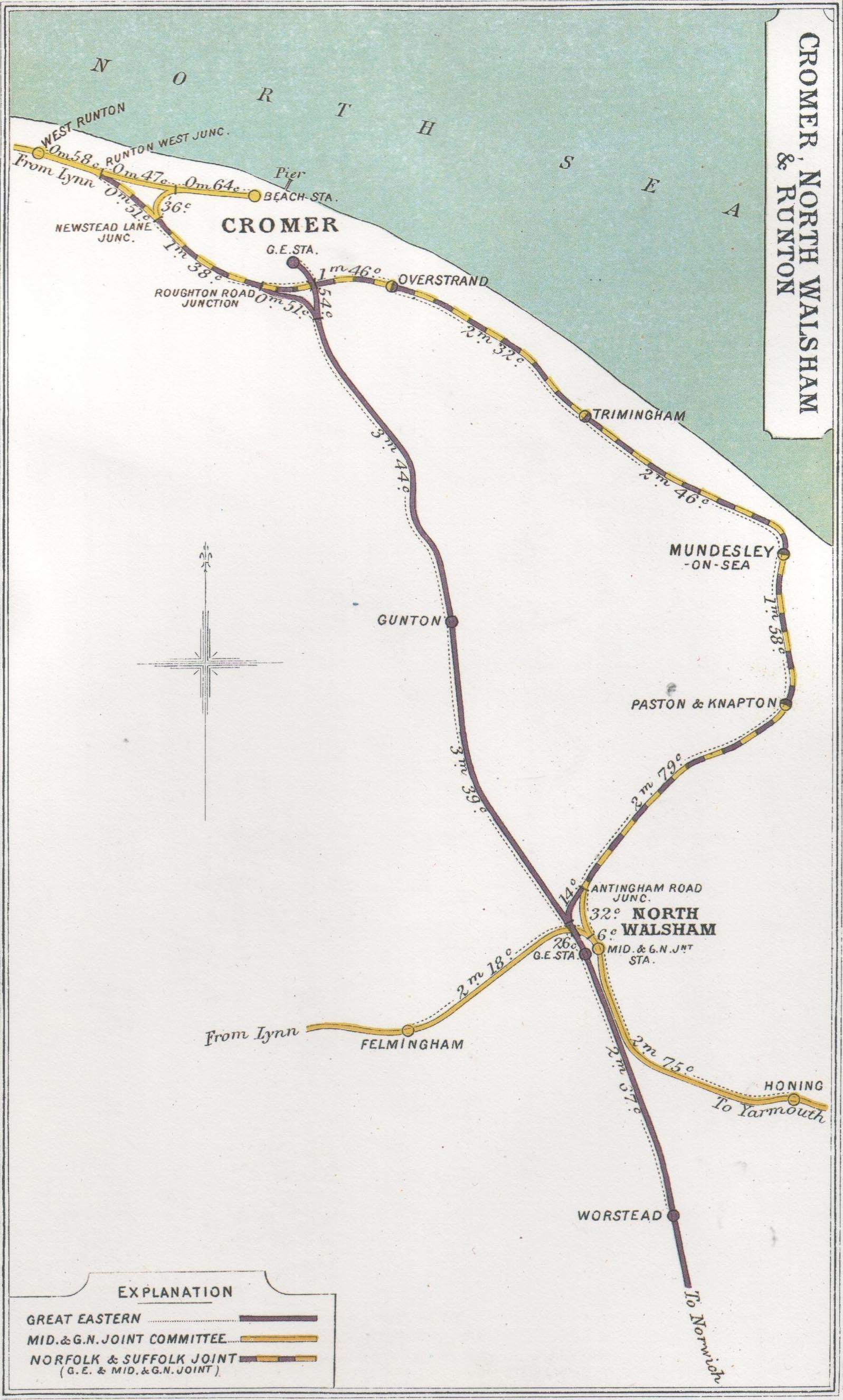
A 1907 Railway Clearing House map showing the North Walsham to Cromer section of the Norfolk and Suffolk Joint Railway (in dotted blue/yellow) and connecting lines

This section of railway was opened in two sections: North Walsham - Mundesley in July 1898; thence to Cromer on 3 August 1906.

The section between Cromer and North Walsham is easy to follow on aerial photographs, and some sections remain open as unofficial footpaths.

Leaving Cromer, a short section of formation remains in use as part of the Bittern Line. The lead into Cromer Tunnel which is the only remaining original railway tunnel in Norfolk. Although the portals remain open access is difficult due to a housing development on the former trackbed.

The first station on this section of the NSJR was Cromer Links Halt (TG232409) which primarily served golfers at the nearby Royal Cromer Golf Club. The station facilities were very basic, consisting of no more than a single wooden platform, which cost £170 to build, two wooden benches and running in board together with the obligatory oil lamps. No shelter was provided for passengers and the platform was constructed of sleepers and supported by wooden trestles.

This was followed by Overstrand railway station, which was provided with an island platform, pedestrian underpass, signal box and passing loop. The station building and underpass remain as a private residence. A section of the embankment towards Cromer was removed to make way for a housing development.

Sidestrand Halt consisted of a simple wooden platform capable of accommodating one coach. Hidden away at the end of a public footpath, the station did not have any ticket-issuing facilities, and these could only be purchased on the trains. The halt had been opened in an attempt to increase revenues on the line by further exploiting the tourist potential of "Poppyland".

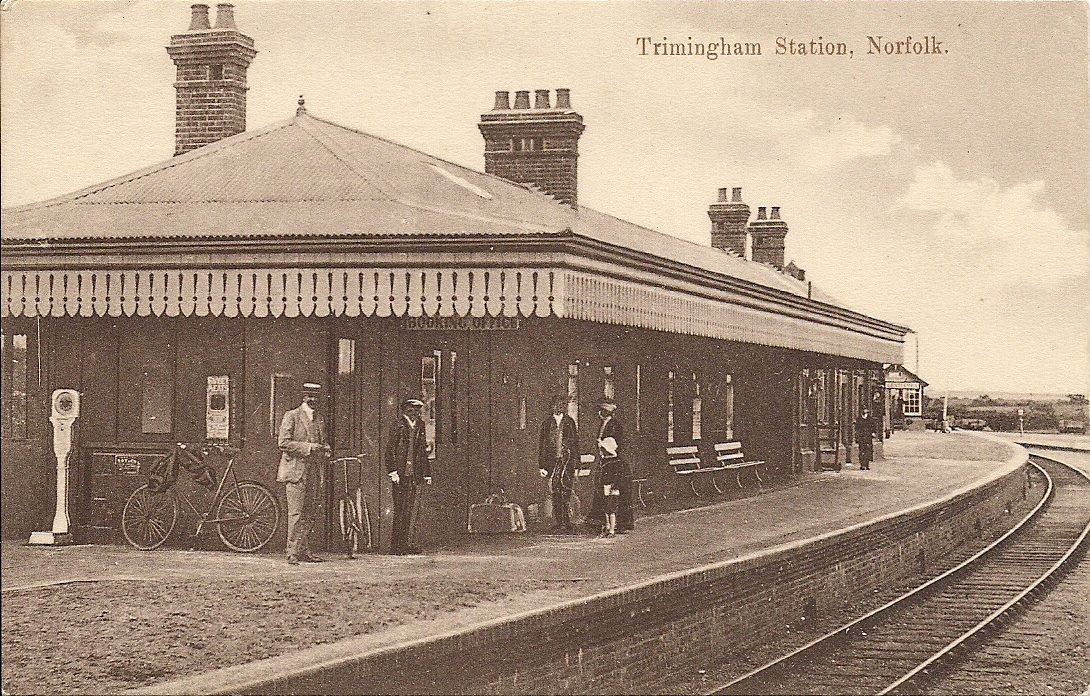
Trimingham station

Trimingham railway station was a similar design to Overstrand, although access to the platforms was provided by steps from a gateway on a nearby road overbridge. Although the station site has been redeveloped, the bridge and the closed station access remain.

Mundesley railway station was provided with wide platforms and substantial buildings and a yard for the anticipated holiday traffic. Today nothing remains of the station site, which has been redeveloped as a housing estate.

Paston & Knapton railway station, the final station on this section of the NSJR before reaching North Walsham remains in good order as a private house. The trackbed continues to the outskirts of North Walsham, having been used as the route for a gas feeder pipe from the Bacton Gas Terminal. Once reaching North Walsham the formation has been used to build a bypass, although the trackbed linking the NSJR to the former GER Bittern Line can be still be clearly seen.

North Walsham Town railway station, the original M&GNJR terminus for the services, closed to passengers in 1959 and the site is now a gas condensate rail terminal.

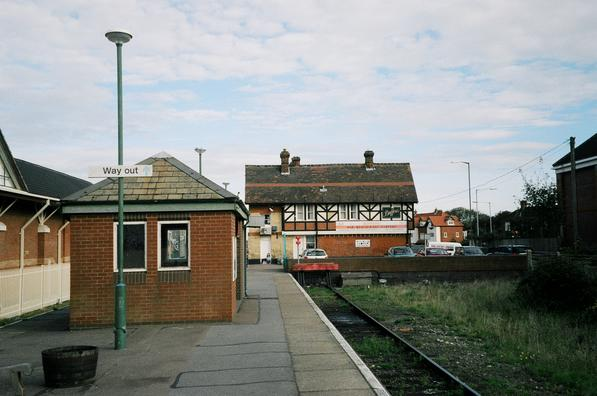
Cromer station (2004)

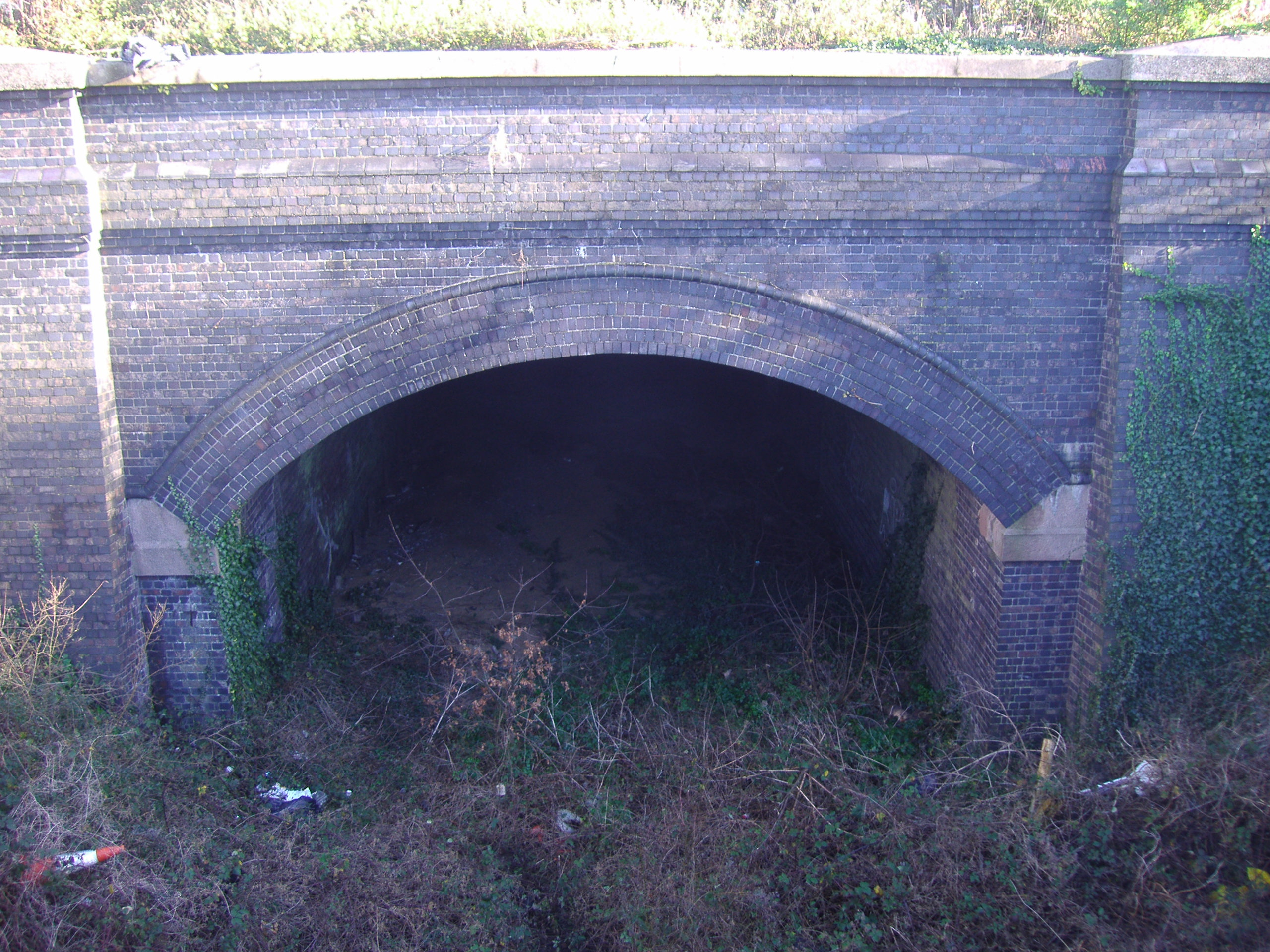
Cromer tunnel (2008)

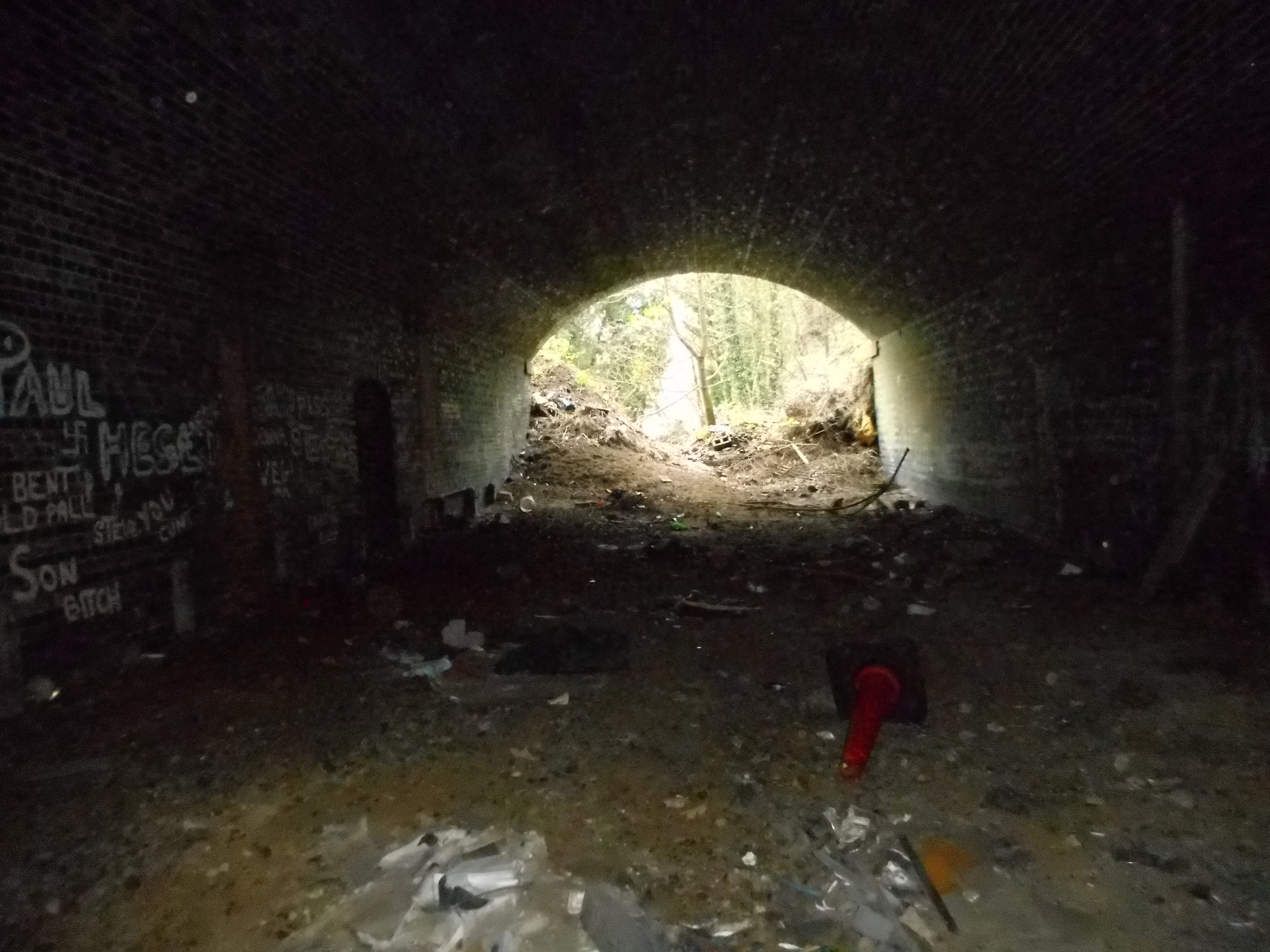
Inside Cromer tunnel (2015)

== Coastal section ==
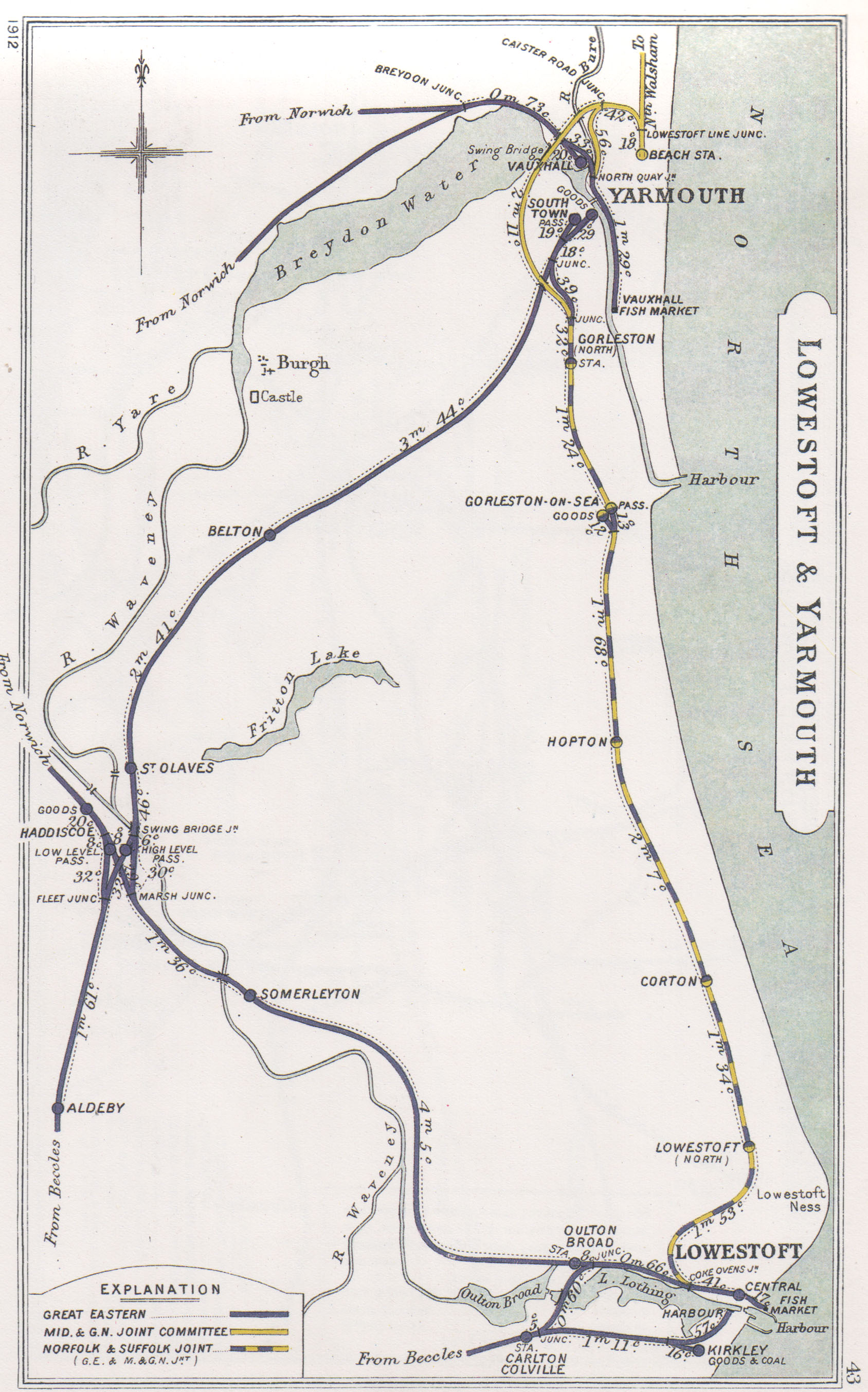
A 1912 Railway Clearing House map showing the coastal section of the Norfolk and Suffolk Joint Railway (in dotted blue/yellow) and connecting lines

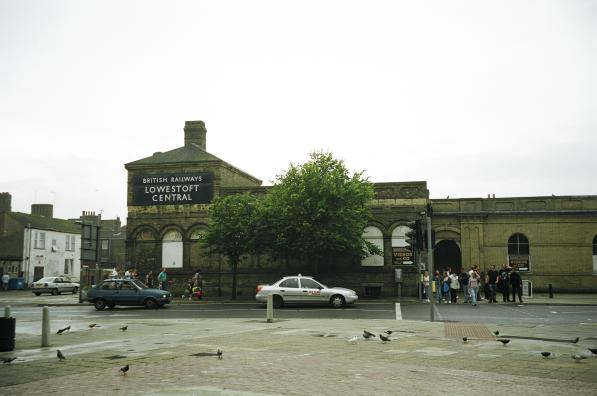
Lowestoft station

The route of most of the coastal section can still be identified by geographical line features readily seen on aerial photographs. Lowestoft Central remains in use, and, although partially redeveloped, the majority of the section of former railway between Lowestoft Central and Lowestoft North station is now a metalled non-vehicular right of way known as "The Great Eastern Linear Park".

On this section, all of the overbridges are intact, some of which still contain relics from their railway heritage.

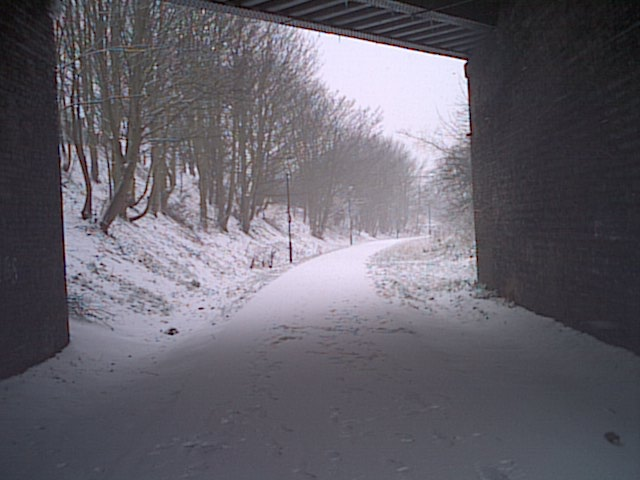
Great Eastern Linear Park

To the north of the town, a large amount of the formation has been redeveloped as a housing estate and, although a section beside the golf course remains clear, the section through the Pleasurewood Hills theme park has been totally removed.

The site of the former station at Lowestoft North is known as "Beeching Drive" with a small pedestrianised area known as "Stephenson's Walk".

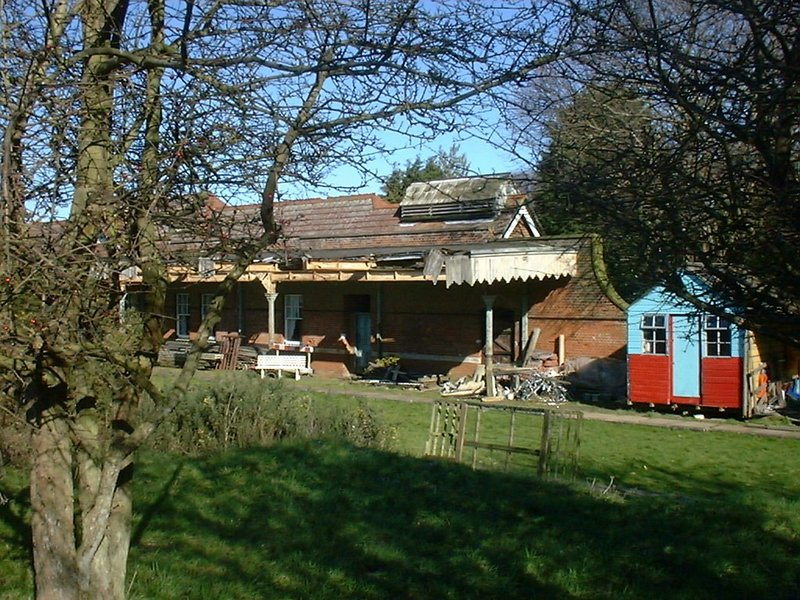
Corton station platform

Corton station is now a private house, however its canopy and other features are in decay. For several years Corton had a static Camping coach in a siding. It was used as accommodation for holiday makers. The line near Corton can be traced fairly easily, including the original embankments.

The line through Hopton has been redeveloped for housing erasing any trace of the railway route. The route of the railway line from Station Road in Hopton, which was the location of Hopton railway station northwards to Gorleston Links ran almost parallel with the A47 (Lowestoft Road. While the line was open, this station was also used as a location for a camping coach.

The next station, Gorleston Links was opened in July 1914 to serve the adjacent golf course. The station was closed four years later as a post-war economy measure, but was reopened in 1919, this time as a result of the increasing number of holiday makers visiting the area. Initially named "Gorleston Links Halt", the station was renamed just "Gorleston Links" in 1968, two years before its eventual closure.

The area where the station was situated has changed greatly in the years since 1970; residential redevelopment has led to the removal of the bridge and embankment, leaving no trace of the former halt.

A small section from the line of Gorleston railway station is in use as a walkway, running about half a mile before ending by a road overbridge. The rest of the line is mostly now housing and roads.

The route of the coastal section from Gorleston-on-Sea northwards to the junction for the line to London is now used by the A47. The original terminus, Yarmouth South Town was also the terminus of the Great Eastern Railway line to Beccles and beyond. After closure. the station was used as the headquarters of an oil company before being demolished in the 1980s to make way for the A47 link road. On the site of the old yards are Homebase, Matalan and Lidl stores.

Details of the coastal section of the N&SJR as part of the a larger network can be found on the page for the Midland and Great Northern Joint Railway.

== Preservation ==
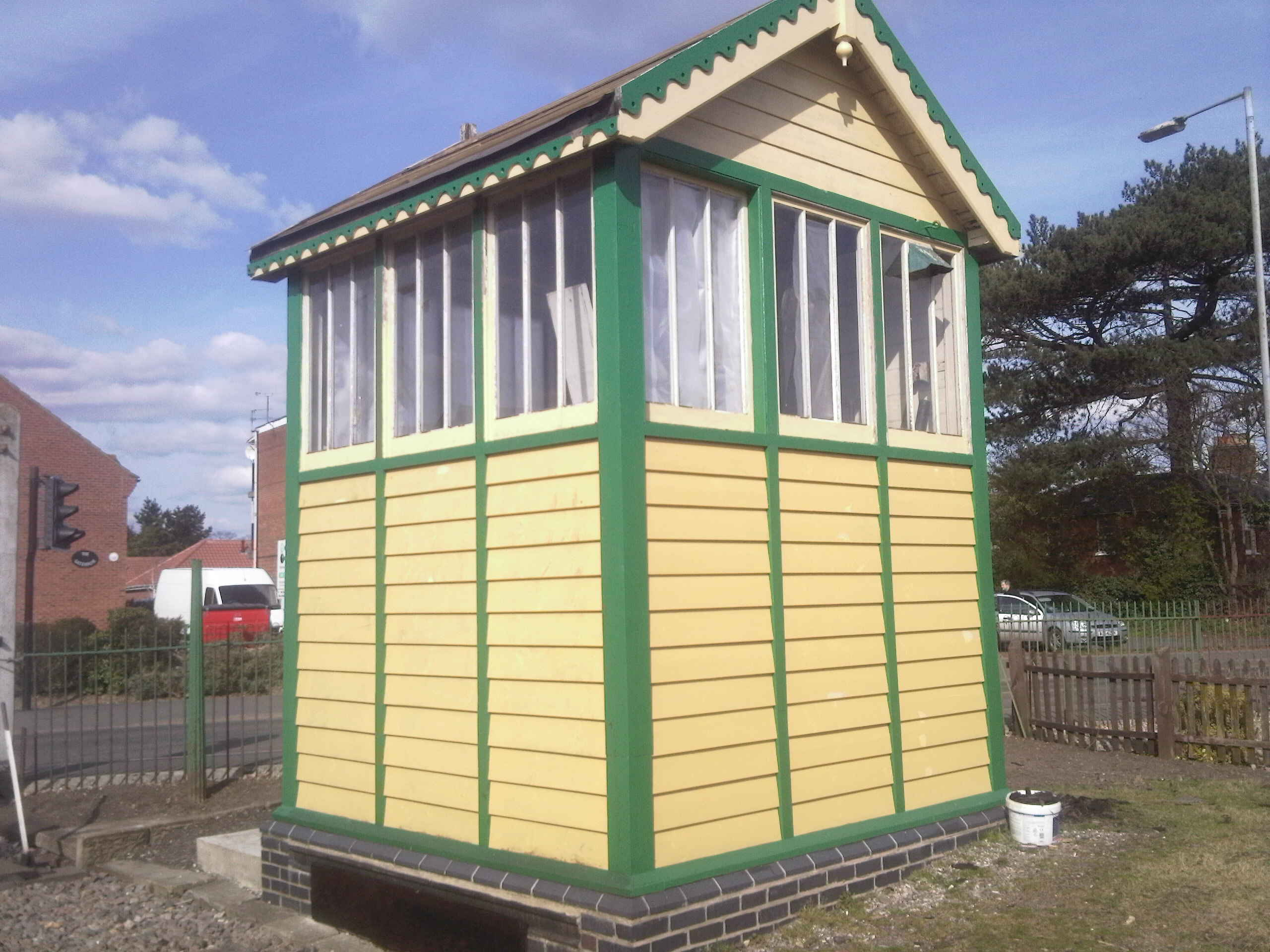
Laundry Lane 'box at Dereham

In the October 1968 of Railway Magazine it was announced that a preservation attempt was to be made on the Lowestoft to Yarmouth line, then under threat of closure by British Railways. The group's intention would have been to provide an all-year round commuter service, with extra steam-hauled trains in summer as a tourist attraction. This scheme did not come to fruition.

A Norfolk and Suffolk Joint Railway signal box, formerly at Laundry Lane (now known as Eastern Way) in Lowestoft, has been rebuilt as Dereham North at East Dereham on the Mid-Norfolk Railway.
