= Yarmouth Beach railway station =

Former railway station in Norfolk, England

Coordinates: 52.6110°N 1.7335°E

Yarmouth Beach
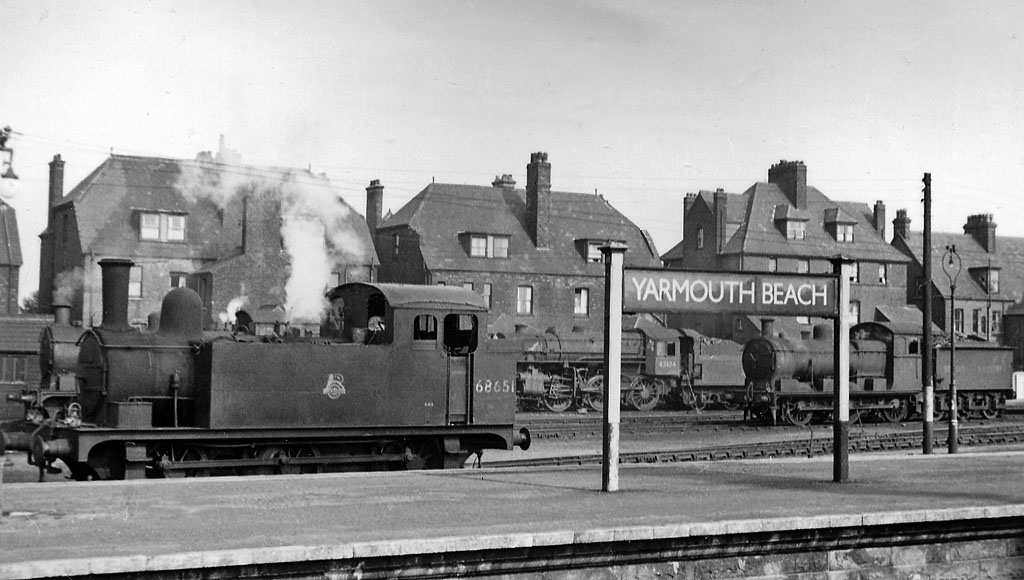

General information
- Location: Great Yarmouth, Great Yarmouth; England
- Grid reference: TG528081
- Platforms: 3

Other information
- Status: Disused

History
- Original company: Great Yarmouth & Stalham Light Railway
- Pre-grouping: Midland and Great Northern Joint Railway
- Post-grouping: Midland and Great Northern Joint Railway; Eastern Region of British Railways

Key dates
- 7 August 1877: Opened as Yarmouth
- 5 April 1883: Renamed Yarmouth Beach
- 2 March 1959: Closed
Location

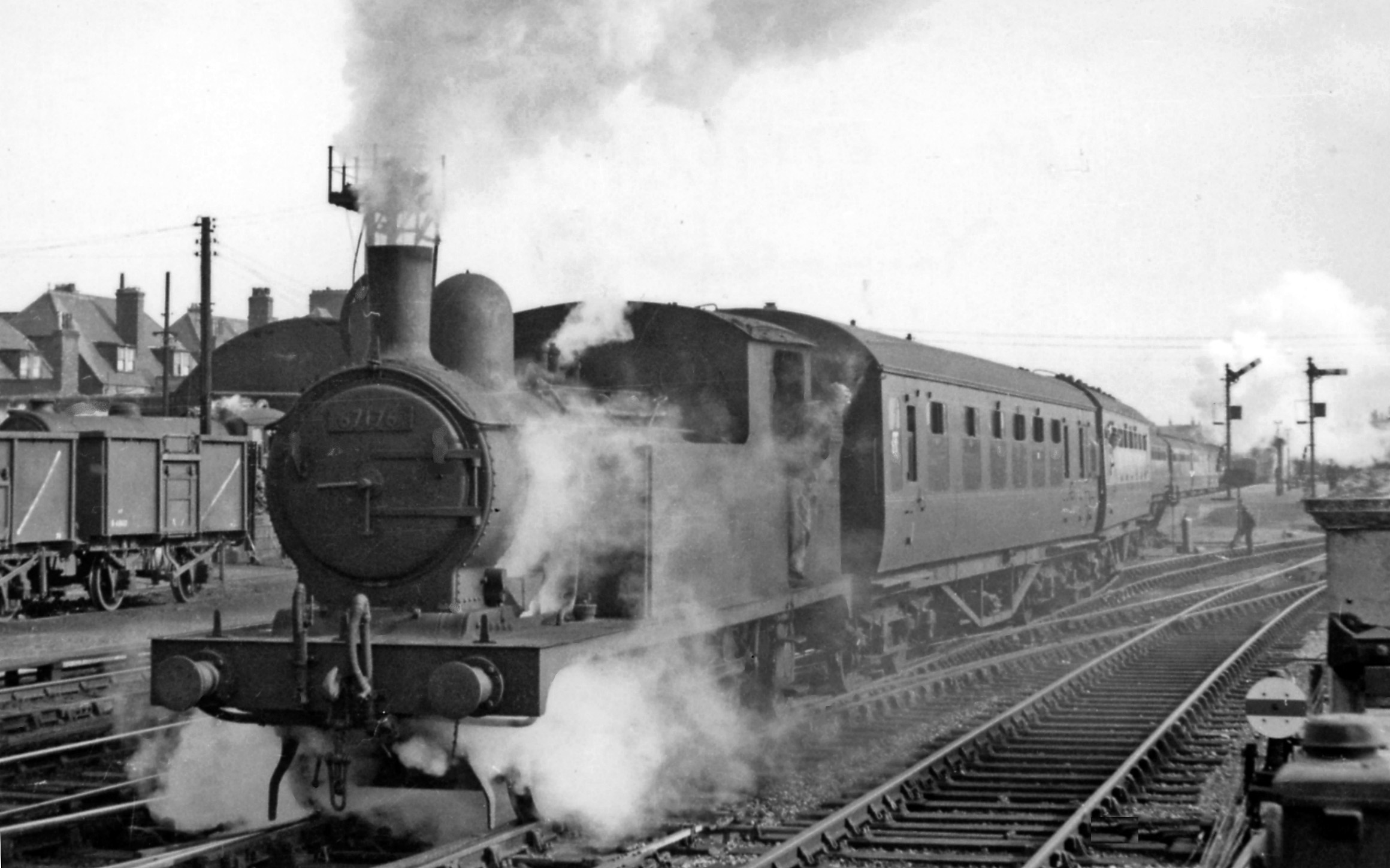
Holiday express from Derby in 1951

Yarmouth Beach railway station served Great Yarmouth, Norfolk. It was opened in 1877 by the Great Yarmouth & Stalham Light Railway; it was taken over by the Midland and Great Northern Joint Railway in 1893, which had built a large network of track over East Anglia. It was conceived initially to transport holidaymakers from the Midlands to their destinations on the Norfolk coast; acquiring Yarmouth Beach station fitted into this grand strategy. The line was also dependent on use by local travellers.

It lacked the direct routes of its rival at Yarmouth Vauxhall, instead taking a winding path across Norfolk without serving major towns.

Use of the line gradually began to decline and, by the 1950s, competition from the roads diminished passenger numbers. Yarmouth Beach and the line it stood on closed in 1959, along with most of the Midland and Great Northern Joint Railway network which was now in British Railways hands.

Following closure, the site was used as a coach station and the station buildings were demolished in 1986. It is now a coach and car park; some platform canopy supports are still extant, which mark its former location.

Preceding station	Disused railways	Following station
Newtown Halt	Midland and Great Northern; Yarmouth Branch	Terminus
