= Westerfield railway station =

Railway station in Suffolk, England

Coordinates: 52.081°N 1.166°E

Westerfield
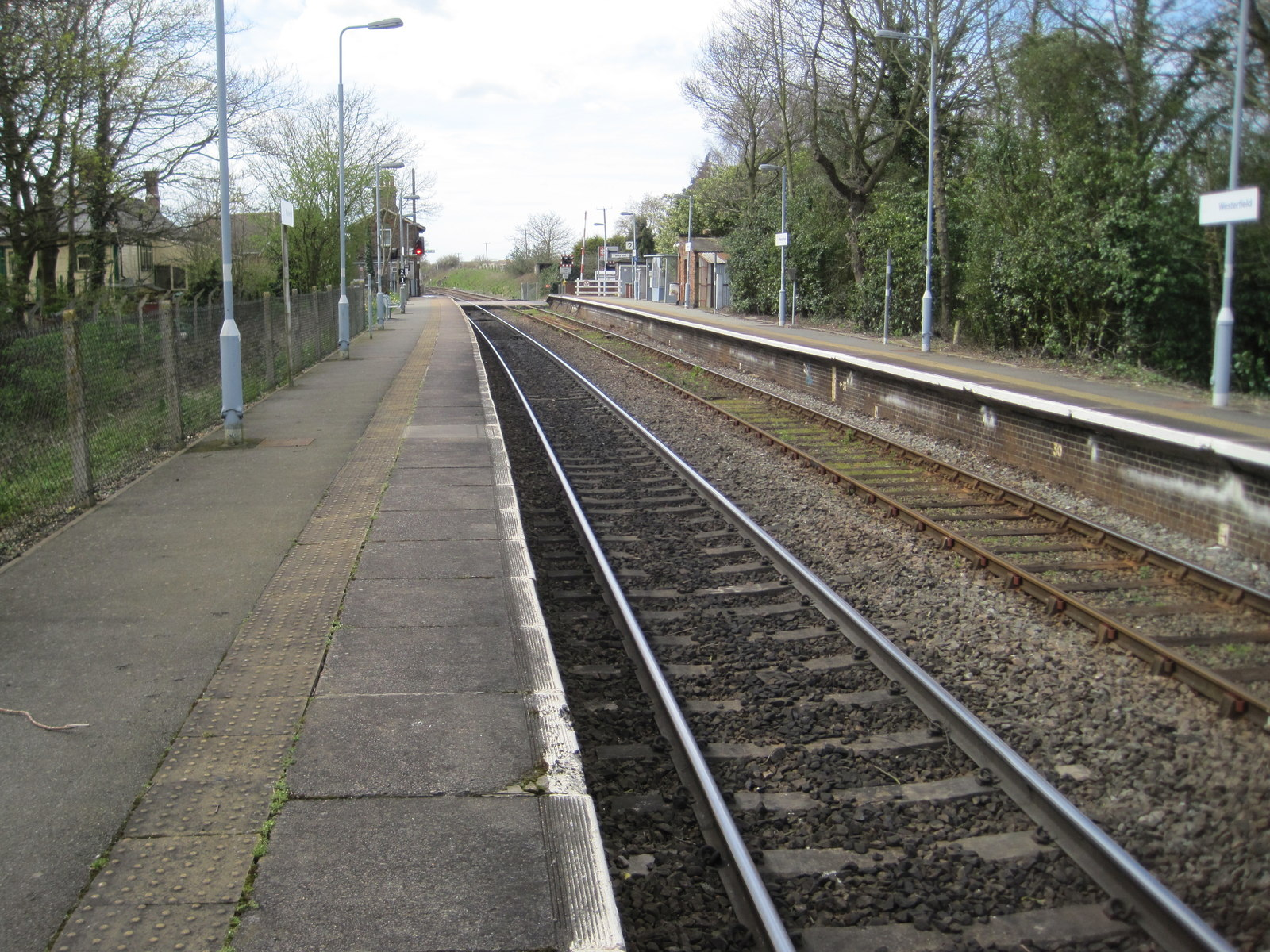
- View of the station

General information
- Location: Westerfield, East Suffolk; England
- Grid reference: TM170472
- Manager: Greater Anglia
- Platforms: 2

Other information
- Station code: WFI
- Classification: DfT category F2

History
- Opened: 1 June 1859

Passengers
- 2021/22: ▲12,988
- Interchange: ▲4,092
- 2022/23: ▲13,970
- Interchange: ▲4,453
- 2023/24: ▲16,444
- Interchange: ▲5,287
- 2024/25: ▲21,666
- Interchange: ▲5,891
- 2025/26: ▲24,580
- Interchange: ▲6,841
Location
Notes
- Passenger statistics from the Office of Rail and Road

Westerfield railway station is on a branch line off the Great Eastern Main Line, in the East of England, serving the village of Westerfield, Suffolk. It is 3 miles 41 chains (5.7 km) from Ipswich and 72 miles 25 chains (116.4 km) from London Liverpool Street. It is situated at the junction of the Felixstowe Branch Line to Felixstowe, and the East Suffolk Line to Lowestoft. Its three-letter station code is WFI.

The station was opened in 1859 and is on the south side of the small village of Westerfield. Patronage has never been high and it may be the fact that its location as a junction of two branches has been partly responsible for keeping it open. Notwithstanding its low usage, a report commissioned by Suffolk County Council reported that 25,384 people lived in the catchment area for the station.

Westerfield station is currently managed by Greater Anglia, which also operates all trains serving the station. Services are typically formed of Class 755 trains. The Felixstowe line sees an hourly shuttle service to Ipswich. Whilst an hourly service (previously 2-hourly) between Ipswich and Lowestoft was introduced in 2012, following the completion of a passing loop at Beccles, most Lowestoft services at Westerfield were suspended to improve punctuality.

Behind the Ipswich-bound platform the original platform and station building of the Felixstowe Dock & Railway Company can still be seen.

== History ==
In about 1847, the Ipswich & Bury Railway had secured the rights to build a line from Ipswich to Woodbridge but construction was delayed for financial reasons. The Ipswich & Bury Railway was absorbed by the Eastern Union Railway in 1847, which gathered a number of the smaller railway concerns together.

The Halesworth, Beccles & Haddiscoe Railway was incorporated in 1851 and the first section of the East Suffolk Line from Beccles to Halesworth was constructed by Peto Brassey & Betts. The East Suffolk Railway, which had been incorporated on 3 July 1854, took over the powers of the Halesworth, Beccles & Haddiscoe Railway and the route opened on 4 December 1854. It continued north to Haddiscoe on what is now part of the Wherry Lines.

On 1 June 1859 the line was opened as far south as Westerfield and Ipswich and north to Yarmouth South Town. In 1862 the Great Eastern Railway took over operation of the line. In 1877 the Felixstowe Branch Line opened. In 1885 an ambitious Midland Railway scheme would, had it come to fruition, have seen Westerfield Junction linked to Chesterton Junction just north of Cambridge.

During the 1880s the station served a factory belonging to the Westerfield Steam Brewery (which also dealt in coal and corn). Coal merchant Thomas Moy was listed as operating in 1896 and 1900.

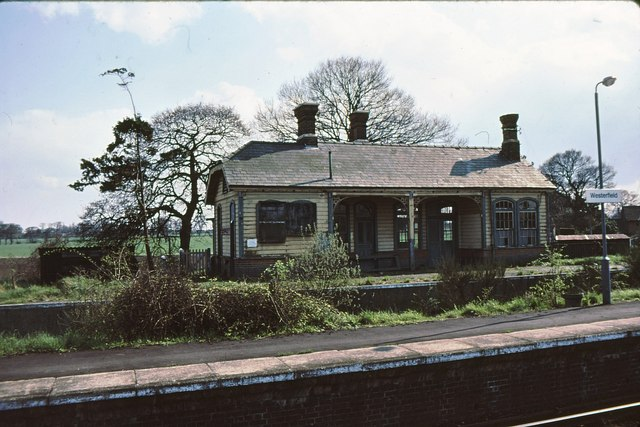
The Felixstowe Railway's offices

On 25 September 1900, at 8:45 am, GER Class Y14 0-6-0 locomotive No. 522, which was then just a year old, stopped at a signal on the Ipswich side of the level crossing awaiting a route to the Felixstowe branch. Shortly afterwards the boiler exploded, killing driver John Barnard and his fireman William MacDonald, both based at Ipswich engine shed. The boiler was thrown 40 yards forwards over the level crossing and landed on the down platform. Apparently, the locomotive had a history of boiler problems although in the official report the boiler foreman at Ipswich engine shed was blamed. The victims were buried in Ipswich cemetery and both their gravestones have a likeness of a Y14 0-6-0 carved onto them.

On 3 May 1902 Westerfield almost became a four-way junction when a sod-cutting ceremony for the Mid-Suffolk Light Railway was held adjacent to the north side of the goods yard. The original plan was to link up with the Mid-Suffolk Railway at Debenham and a short section of this line was built at the Debenham end. It was never completed.

Around the early 20th century, excursion trains travelled from such places as the Framlingham Branch to Felixstowe and it is possible the locomotives would have run round the carriages in the station (rather than run to Ipswich) in order to access the branch. No scheduled services did this.

In 1923 the Great Eastern Railway was merged into the London and North Eastern Railway. During World War II a number of engines were stored in the bay platforms but returned to use later in the war. These included three of the regular Felixstowe branch engines Nos. 6123, 6128 and 6130 (C14 4-4-2T). It was also where Polish armoured train C was based.

In 1948 the railways were nationalised and Westerfield Junction became part of the Eastern Region of British Railways. During the winter months in the 1950s a pair of camping coaches were stored in the goods yard. These were based at Felixstowe Pier during the summer. In the 1960s, as part of the Beeching cuts, the East Suffolk Line was marked for closure but a vigorous local campaign saw it saved. It was reduced to a very basic railway in order to cut costs although some through services to London survived until the 1980s.

On 13 July 1964 the goods yard closed with the track into the bay platforms being lifted sometime later in the 1960s. In 1967 all booking offices in the area closed and all trains became operated by conductor guards. The late 1960s saw the steady growth of freight through Felixstowe with Freightliner trains being seen increasingly through Westerfield.

In 1985 the layout was changed in connection with the introduction of Radio Electronic Token Block signalling. Trains for Felixstowe now changed tracks west of the level crossing and worked through the Ipswich-bound platform. Westerfield's signal box remained as the Felixstowe branch was still signalled under the Absolute Block system. The signal box closed in 1999 and the Felixstowe branch was controlled by the Colchester Power Signal Box under the Track Circuit Block system of signalling. In the early 1990s the Felixstowe Dock & Railway Company buildings which had stood derelict for many years were converted to a private residence.

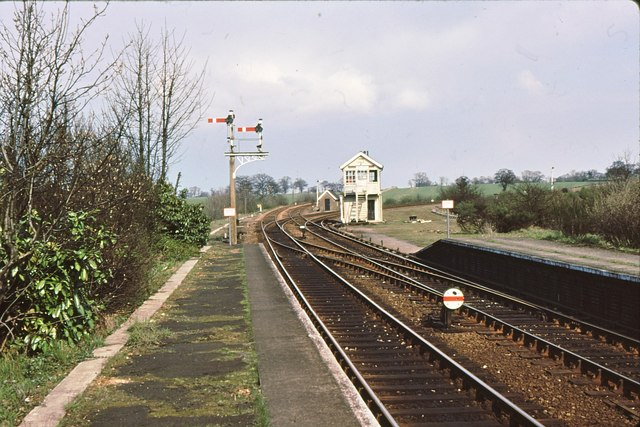
Westerfield Junction signal box in 1979

On privatisation in 1994 the ownership of the infrastructure passed to Railtrack (which was replaced by Network Rail in 2002), whilst management of the station, as well as the services serving it, were initially operated by a business unit and the first franchise was awarded to Anglia Railways. The second round of franchising in 2004 saw the One franchise owned by National Express take over; this was renamed National Express East Anglia in 2008.

=== Operations ===
In 1877 the station opened as a terminus of the Felixstowe Branch Line with four trains arriving and departing each day. The bay platforms were built for this purpose, as was the office for the Felixstowe Dock & Railway Company. The Great Eastern Railway took over the line in 1879 and most Felixstowe trains were extended to and from Ipswich.

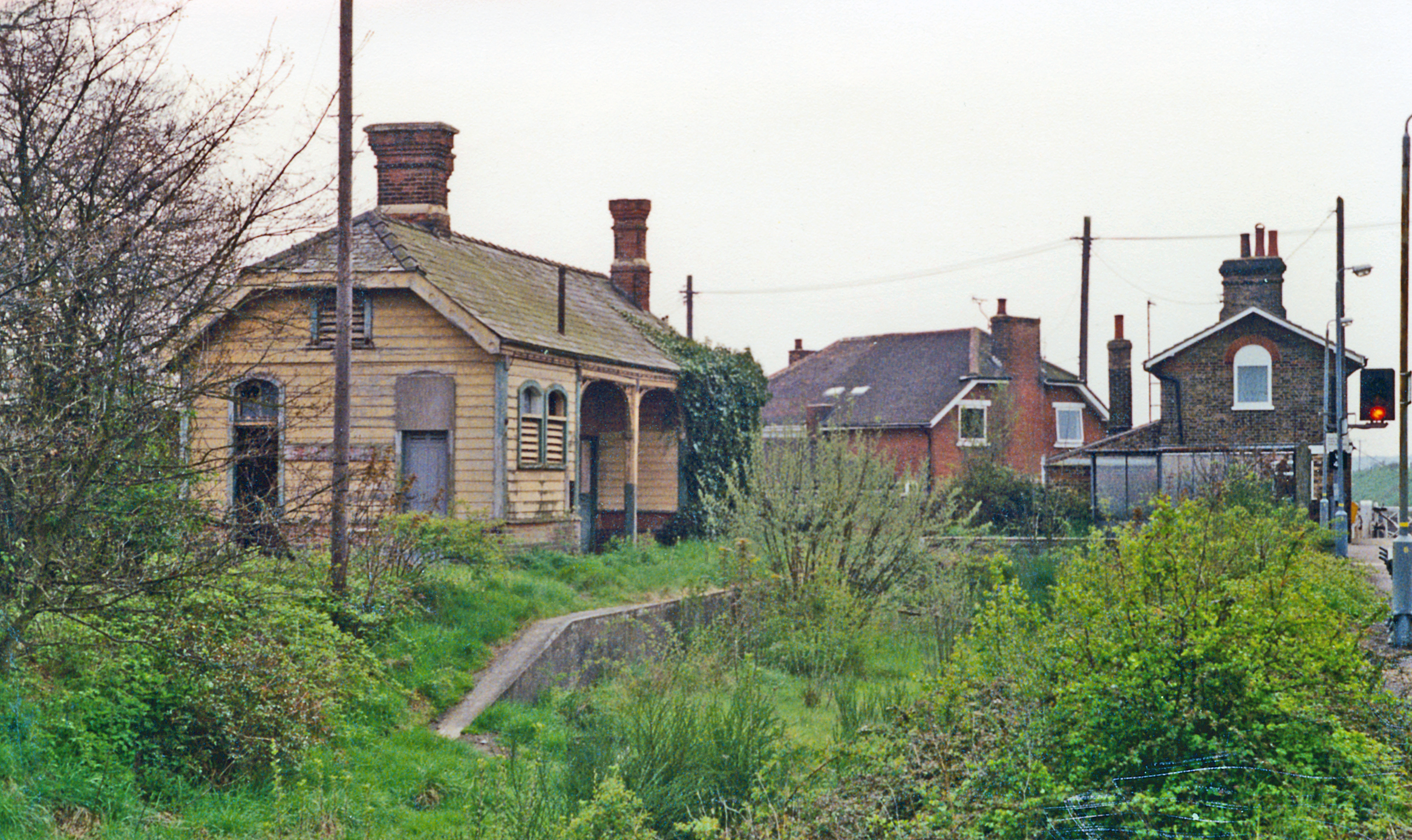
Remains of the old terminus station in 1988

The 1905 timetable reported through-coaches for Felixstowe from London Liverpool Street being detached at Westerfield where another locomotive would then have been attached to the coaches for the journey down to Felixstowe.

In June 1922 there were seven weekday services to the East Suffolk Line and ten to the Felixstowe branch. On Sundays there were two services to the East Suffolk and six to the Felixstowe line.

In the September 1964 timetable only four Felixstowe and a single East Suffolk train served the station on a weekday.

Through services to Liverpool Street ended in 1984. They were restored in 2004 and ceased again in 2010.

Service on the East Suffolk Line was reduced during 2012 whilst other stations on the ESL enjoyed an improved hourly service.

With extensive housing development to the West of the station (Ipswich Garden Suburb) there is potential for a significant increase in passenger numbers, if adequate footpaths are provided and service levels prove to be attractive. The East Suffolk Travel Association is arguing for all ESL trains to serve Westerfield. In May 2025 an additional Ipswich-bound service was provided at 17:36 providing a convenient route into Westerfield from Woodbridge and beyond.

== Description ==
The station is situated to the east of the Ipswich to Westerfield Road which crosses the East Suffolk Line on the level. The station building is situated on the southern side of the East Suffolk Line. There were two through platforms when the station opened and these were supplemented by two further bay platforms when the Felixstowe Branch Line opened in 1877. The Felixstowe Railway Company had offices on the southernmost platform which are still extant today as a private residence after they had stood derelict for many years.

The goods yard was situated on the northern side of the line and consisted of a couple of sidings accessed by setting back from the main line.

To the west of the station and level crossing there was a short branch (1.5 miles long) which ran to a brick and tile works in what is now known as the Dales area of Ipswich. There was a second brick works just north of Grove Farm. In World War I the line was requisitioned by the government to serve a munitions depot in the Upper Dales. In 1921 the line was worked by a Garrett steam road tractor as the track was in poor condition and it was removed in about 1927.

The original signal box was situated at the east end of the Lowestoft platform but this was replaced by a standard Great Eastern structure located at the junction for the Felixstowe branch. Absolute Block signalling was withdrawn between Westerfield and Oulton Broad when the East Suffolk Line was upgraded to the Radio Electronic Token Block system. The box survived as the Felixstowe branch still had conventional block signalling with the next box being at Derby Road albeit with a large modern radio mast inelegantly attached to a Victorian structure. The box finally closed in when the signalling was upgraded in 1999 and the area is now controlled by Colchester Power Signal Box.

The original track bed forming the siding to the South of Platform 1 has been partially filled with earth and recently (since COVID-19) an award-winning garden has been created by the Westerfield Station Adopters.

== Services ==
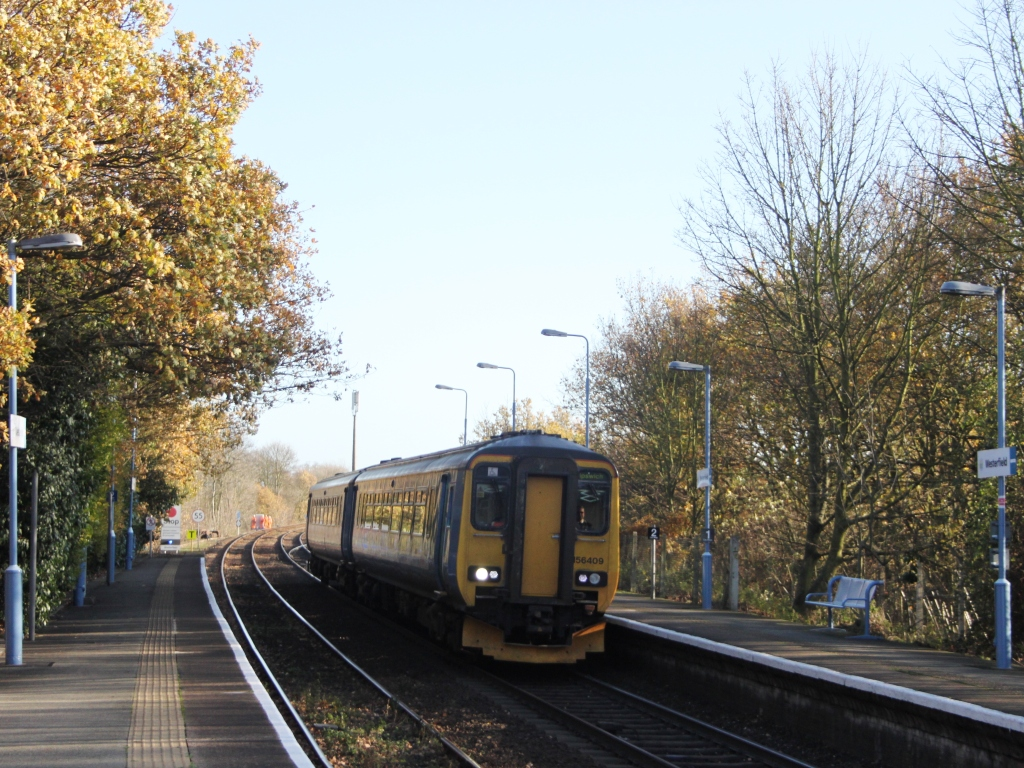
A Class 156 working an East Suffolk Line service from Saxmundham

Passenger trains serving Westerfield are currently operated by Greater Anglia. Outside of the weekday peaks and on Saturdays, trains calling at Westerfield are usually those travelling on the Felixstowe Branch Line between Ipswich and Felixstowe. These services typically call once every hour.

East Suffolk Line trains between Ipswich and Lowestoft generally only call during the weekday peak hours. There are five trains a day in the up (from Lowestoft) direction: three in the morning peak one at 17:36 and the last train of the day from Lowestoft, and four in the down (towards Lowestoft) direction: two in the morning (the first of these trains terminates at Saxmundham), and two in the evening. The only East Suffolk Line train to stop at Westerfield on Saturdays is the 21:07 service from Lowestoft to Ipswich, the last train of the day in that direction. There is a partial (2 hourly) service on Sundays.

The typical weekday service at Westerfield is as follows:

Operator	Route	Rolling stock	Typical frequency
Greater Anglia	Felixstowe - Trimley - Derby Road - Westerfield - Ipswich	Class 755	1x per hour in each direction
Greater Anglia	Lowestoft - Oulton Broad South - Beccles - Brampton (on request) - Halesworth - Darsham - Saxmundham - Wickham Market - Melton - Woodbridge - Westerfield - Ipswich	Class 755	Limited peak-hours only- Full hourly service on Sundays

No freight is handled at Westerfield but freight trains do pass through as the Felixstowe branch is busy with goods trains for the port of Felixstowe operated by DB Schenker, Freightliner and GBRf. Direct Rail Services also operate a less frequent service to Sizewell nuclear power station.

Preceding station	National Rail	Following station
Woodbridge	Greater Anglia East Suffolk Line	Ipswich
Derby Road	Greater Anglia Felixstowe Branch Line	Ipswich
	Historical railways	
Bealings Line open, station closed	Great Eastern Railway East Suffolk Railway	Ipswich Line and station open
