= Melton railway station =

Melton railway station may refer to:

- Melton railway station, Melbourne, Australia
- Melton railway station (Suffolk), England
