= Geldeston railway station =

Railway station in Geldeston, England

Coordinates: 52.4708°N 1.5130°E

Geldeston
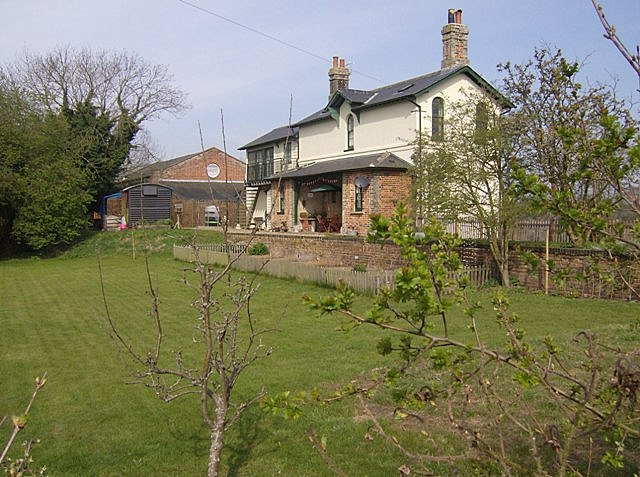

General information
- Location: Geldeston, South Norfolk; England
- Grid reference: TM386916
- Platforms: 1

Other information
- Status: Disused

History
- Original company: Great Eastern Railway
- Pre-grouping: Great Eastern Railway
- Post-grouping: London and North Eastern Railway; Eastern Region of British Railways

Key dates
- 2 March 1863: Opened as Geldeston
- 22 May 1916: Closed
- 14 September 1916: Reopened as Geldeston Halt
- 2 October 1922: Renamed Geldeston
- 5 January 1953: Closed to passengers
- 13 July 1964: Closed to freight
Location

Geldeston (also Geldeston Halt) was a station on the Waveney Valley Line serving the village of Geldeston, Norfolk. It was operational for passenger services between 1863 and 1953, before closing completely in 1964. It was the penultimate station on the line, and the last in Norfolk as the line crossed the border into Suffolk before the junction station of Beccles. The station still exists today and can easily be found in Geldeston.

Preceding station	Disused railways	Following station
Ellingham	Great Eastern Railway; Waveney Valley Line	Beccles
