= Greater Anglia =

British state-owned train operating company

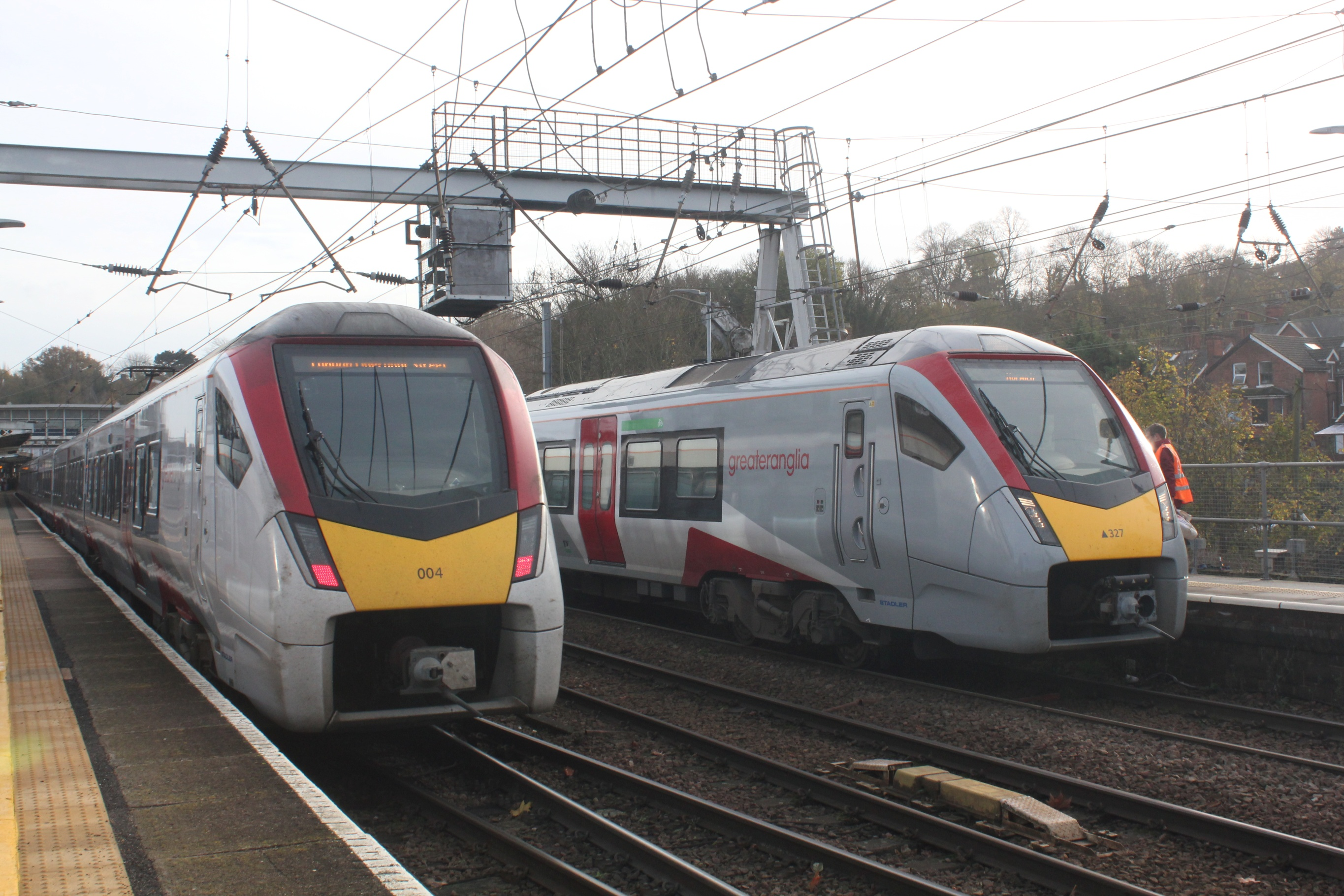
- Greater Anglia Class 745 and Class 755 units at Ipswich

Overview
- Franchise: East Anglia 12 October 2025
- Main regions: East of England; Greater London
- Fleet: Class 720 Aventra; Class 745 FLIRT; Class 755 FLIRT
- Stations called at: 150
- Stations operated: 134
- Parent company: DfT Operator
- Headquarters: London
- Reporting mark: LE
- Predecessor: Greater Anglia

Other
- Website: www.greateranglia.co.uk

GA Trains Limited, trading as Greater Anglia and GBR Anglia, is a state-owned British train operating company that provides commuter and inter-city services from its Central London terminus at Liverpool Street station to Essex, Suffolk, Norfolk and parts of Hertfordshire and Cambridgeshire, as well as many regional services throughout the East of England.

It took over the services of the operator of the same name from Transport UK Group and Mitsui & Co on 12 October 2025.

Greater Anglia is managed by a unified team, GBR Anglia, that includes neighbouring operator c2c and track operator Network Rail Anglia.

== History ==
In the lead-up to the 2024 United Kingdom general election, the Labour Party of Keir Starmer committed itself to bring the passenger operations of the British rail network back under state ownership. Following its election win, the government introduced the Passenger Railway Services (Public Ownership) Act 2024 that received royal assent in November 2024.

In December 2024, it was announced that Greater Anglia's contract would be terminated after the Department for Transport activated a break clause, with DfT Operator taking over services on 12 October 2025.

In January 2026, Greater Anglia announced installation of new anti-trespass measures, after figures from 2025/26 revealed that trespass incidents caused more than 18 days' worth of delays. The measures involve the installation of additional fences, gates and witches' hats (rubber spikes on the ground) at stations in Cambridgeshire, Hertfordshire, Norfolk and Suffolk.

In May 2026, GBR Anglia was established to unify the management of Greater Anglia with neighbouring operator c2c and track operator Network Rail Anglia.

== Services ==
As of May 2026, the following services, inherited from Greater Anglia's predecessor, operate during the off-peak period, Monday to Friday:

=== Inter-City ===
| Route | tph | Calling at |
|---|---|---|
| London Liverpool Street – Norwich | 2 | Stratford (Note: Pick up only northbound, set down only southbound) (1 tph); Chelmsford (1 tph); Colchester; Manningtree; Ipswich; Stowmarket; Diss; Services call at either Chelmsford or Stratford. |

=== Great Eastern ===
Great Eastern Main Line
| Route | tph | Calling at |
|---|---|---|
| London Liverpool Street – Ipswich | 1 | Stratford; Shenfield; Chelmsford; Beaulieu Park; Hatfield Peverel; Witham; Kelvedon; Marks Tey; Colchester; Manningtree |
Shenfield–Southend and Crouch Valley lines
| Route | tph | Calling at |
| London Liverpool Street – Southend Victoria | 3 | Stratford; Romford (2 tph); Shenfield; Billericay; Wickford; Rayleigh; Hockley; Rochford; Southend Airport; Prittlewell |
| Wickford – Southminster | 3/2 | Battlesbridge; South Woodham Ferrers; North Fambridge; Althorne; Burnham-on-Crouch |
Braintree branch line
| Route | tph | Calling at |
| London Liverpool Street – Braintree | 1 | Stratford; Shenfield; Ingatestone; Chelmsford; Witham; White Notley; Cressing; Braintree Freeport |
Gainsborough line
| Route | tph | Calling at |
| Marks Tey – Sudbury | 1 | Chappel & Wakes Colne; Bures |
Sunshine Coast Line
| Route | tph | Calling at |
| London Liverpool Street – Colchester Town | 1 | Stratford; Shenfield; Chelmsford; Beaulieu Park; Witham; Kelvedon; Marks Tey; Colchester |
| London Liverpool Street – Clacton-on-Sea | 1 | Stratford; Shenfield; Ingatestone; Chelmsford; Witham; Colchester; Hythe; Wivenhoe; Thorpe-le-Soken |
| Colchester – Colchester Town | 1 | Shuttle service |
| Colchester – Walton-on-the-Naze | 1 | Colchester Town (Note: Trains reverse); Hythe; Wivenhoe; Alresford; Great Bentley; Weeley; Thorpe-le-Soken; Kirby Cross; Frinton-on-Sea |
Mayflower line
| Route | tph | Calling at |
| Manningtree – Harwich Town | 1 | Mistley; Wrabness; Harwich International; Dovercourt; Additional irregular services in partnership with Stena's Dutchflyer to Harwich International are provided from London Liverpool Street, Cambridge, and Lowestoft. |

=== West Anglia ===
West Anglia Main Line
| Route | tph | Calling at |
|---|---|---|
| London Liverpool Street – Cambridge North | 2 | Tottenham Hale; Cheshunt; Broxbourne; Harlow Town; Harlow Mill (1 tph); Sawbridgeworth (1 tph); Bishop's Stortford; Stansted Mountfitchet (1 tph); Elsenham (1 tph); Newport (1 tph); Audley End; Great Chesterford (1 tph); Whittlesford Parkway; Shelford (1 tph); Cambridge South; Cambridge; Harlow Mill, Sawbridgeworth, Stansted Mountfitchet, Elsenham, Newport, Great Chesterford, and Shelford are all served by the same trains. |
| Stratford – Meridian Water | 2 | Lea Bridge; Tottenham Hale; Northumberland Park |
| Stratford – Bishop's Stortford | 2 | Lea Bridge; Tottenham Hale; Northumberland Park (1 tph); Enfield Lock (1 tph); Waltham Cross (1 tph); Cheshunt; Broxbourne; Roydon; Harlow Town; Harlow Mill (1 tph); Sawbridgeworth; Northumberland Park, Enfield Lock, Waltham Cross and Harlow Mill are served by the same trains. |
Hertford East branch line
| Route | tph | Calling at |
| London Liverpool Street – Hertford East | 2 | Hackney Downs; Tottenham Hale; Ponders End; Brimsdown; Enfield Lock; Waltham Cross; Cheshunt; Broxbourne; Rye House; St Margarets; Ware |

=== Regional ===
Felixstowe branch line
| Route | tph | Calling at |
|---|---|---|
| Ipswich – Felixstowe | 1 | Westerfield; Derby Road; Trimley |
East Suffolk line
| Route | tph | Calling at |
| Ipswich – Lowestoft | 1 | Woodbridge; Melton; Wickham Market; Saxmundham; Darsham; Halesworth; Brampton; Beccles; Oulton Broad South |
Ipswich–Ely line
| Route | tph | Calling at |
| Ipswich – Cambridge | 1 | Needham Market; Stowmarket; Elmswell; Thurston; Bury St Edmunds; Kennett (1 tp2h); Newmarket; Dullingham (1 tp2h); Kennett and Dullingham are served by alternate trains. |
| Ipswich – Peterborough | 1/2 | Stowmarket; Bury St Edmunds; Soham; Ely; Manea; March; Whittlesea |
Bittern Line
| Route | tph | Calling at |
| Norwich – Sheringham | 1 | Salhouse; Hoveton & Wroxham; Worstead; North Walsham; Gunton; Roughton Road; Cromer; West Runton |
Wherry Lines
| Route | tph | Calling at |
| Norwich – Great Yarmouth | 1 | Brundall Gardens; Brundall; Lingwood; Acle; 2 trains per day run via Berney Arms, calling at Cantley, Reedham, and Berney Arms in lieu of Lingwood and Acle. |
| Norwich – Lowestoft | 1 | Brundall; Buckenham (1 train per day); Cantley; Reedham; Haddiscoe; Somerleyton; Oulton Broad North |
Breckland line
| Route | tph | Calling at |
| Norwich – Stansted Airport | 1 | Wymondham; Attleborough; Thetford; Brandon; Ely; Cambridge North; Cambridge; Cambridge South; Whittlesford Parkway; Audley End |

=== Stansted Express ===
Greater Anglia operates the Stansted Express sub-branded airport rail link between Stansted Airport and London Liverpool Street. As of December 2025, Stansted Express' off-peak services Monday to Friday are:

| Route | tph | Calling at |
|---|---|---|
| London Liverpool Street - Stansted Airport | 4 | Tottenham Hale; Harlow Town (2 tph); Bishop's Stortford (2 tph); Stansted Mountfitchet (1 tph); Services alternate between Harlow Town and Bishop's Stortford; with Stansted Mountfitchet being served by Bishop's Stortford services (northbound), or Harlow services (southbound). |

== Fleet ==
In October 2025, Greater Anglia inherited the following rolling stock from its predecessor.

| Family | Class | Image | Type | Top speed | | Number | Carriages | Routes operated | Built |
| Family | Class | Image | Type | mph | km/h | Number | Carriages | Routes operated | Built |
Shunting locomotive
| | 08 | N/A | Shunter | 15 | 24 | 3 | N/A | Stock movements | 1952–1962 |
Electric multiple units
| Bombardier Aventra | 720/1 | | EMU | 100 | 161 | 44 | 5 | London to Cambridge North and Ely; Hertford East branch line; West Anglia Main Line; Braintree branch line; Crouch Valley line; Dutchflyer; Great Eastern Main Line; Shenfield–Southend line; Sunshine Coast Line | 2018–2021 |
| Bombardier Aventra | 720/5 | | EMU | 100 | 161 | 89 | 5 | London to Cambridge North and Ely; Hertford East branch line; West Anglia Main Line; Braintree branch line; Crouch Valley line; Dutchflyer; Great Eastern Main Line; Shenfield–Southend line; Sunshine Coast Line | 2018–2021 |
| Stadler FLIRT | 745/0 | | EMU | 100 | 161 | 10 | 12 | Great Eastern Main Line | 2018-2020 |
| Stadler FLIRT | 745/1 | | EMU | 100 | 161 | 10 | 12 | Stansted Express | 2018-2020 |
Bi-mode multiple units
| Stadler FLIRT | 755/3; 755/4 | | BMU | 100 | 161 | 14 | 3 | Wherry Lines; Breckland line; Bittern Line; East Suffolk line; Great Eastern Main Line; West Anglia Main Line; Felixstowe branch line; Ipswich–Ely line; Gainsborough line | 2018–2020 |
| Stadler FLIRT | 755/3; 755/4 | | BMU | 100 | 161 | 24 | 4 | Wherry Lines; Breckland line; Bittern Line; East Suffolk line; Great Eastern Main Line; West Anglia Main Line; Felixstowe branch line; Ipswich–Ely line; Gainsborough line | 2018–2020 |
