= Bealings railway station =

Disused railway station in Suffolk, England

Bealings
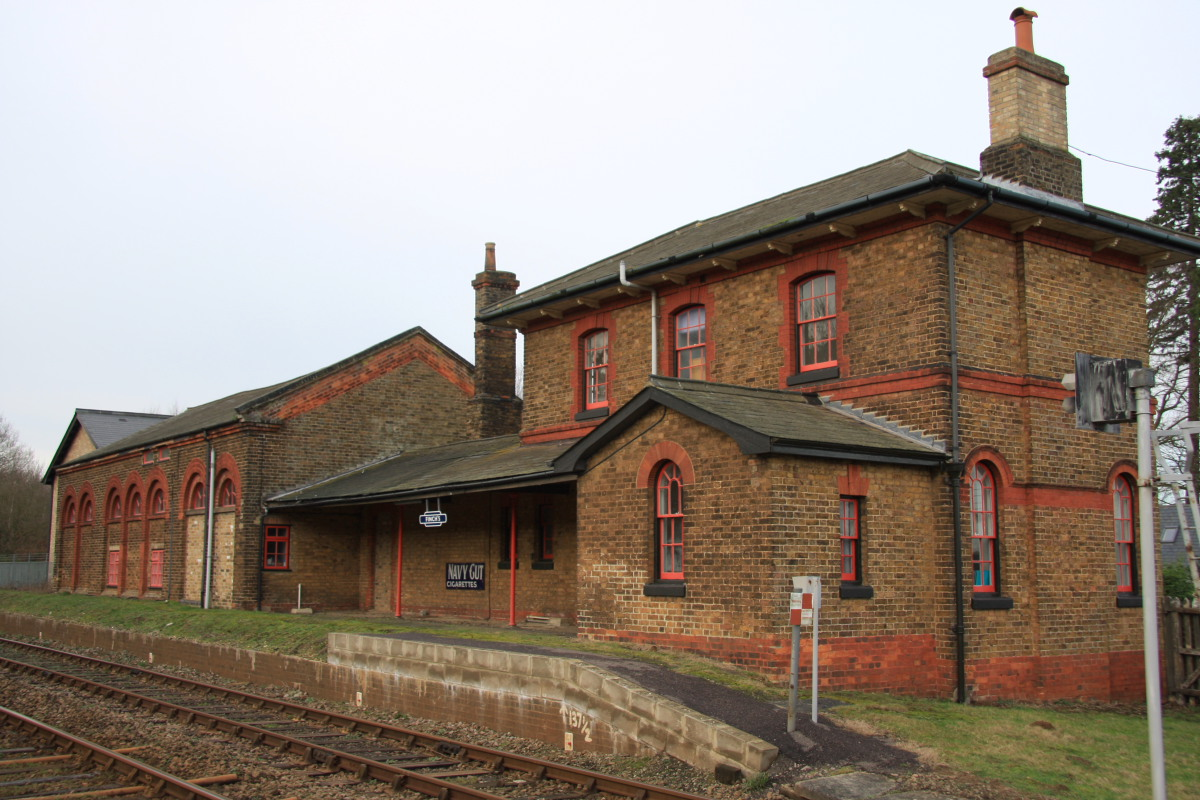
- Bealings railway station in 2008

General information
- Location: Little Bealings, East Suffolk; England
- Coordinates: 52.0800°N 1.2540°E
- Platforms: 2

Other information
- Status: Disused

History
- Pre-grouping: Great Eastern Railway
- Post-grouping: London and North Eastern Railway; British Railways

Key dates
- 1 June 1859: Station opens
- 17 Sept 1956: Closed to passengers
- April 1965: Closed for goods
Location

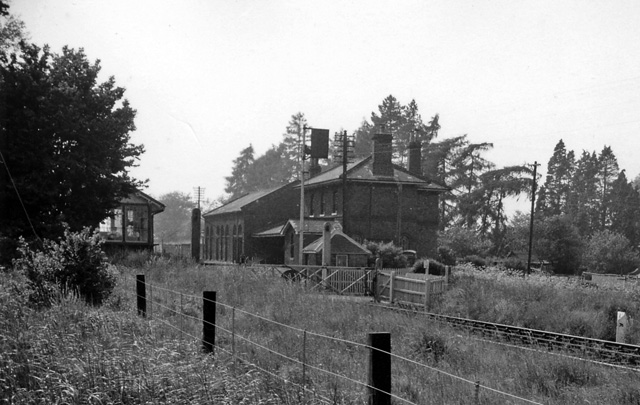
The station in 1963

Bealings railway station was a station in Little Bealings, Suffolk, on the line between Ipswich and Lowestoft. It was 7 miles 20 chains (11.7 km) down the line from Ipswich. While the station closed on 17 September 1956, the line remains open and both the station building and platforms survive.

It was opened by the Eastern Union Railway (EUR) on 1 June 1859 when the full East Suffolk Line opened between Great Yarmouth in Norfolk and Ipswich in Suffolk. The station buildings were designed by Frederick Barnes (architect), who also designed Woodbridge station. By the 1860s the railways in East Anglia were in financial trouble, and most (including the EUR) were leased to the Eastern Counties Railway; they wished to amalgamate formally, but could not obtain government agreement for this until 1862, when the Great Eastern Railway was formed by amalgamation. Thus in 1862 the operation of Bealings Station was taken over by the Great Eastern Railway who operated the station until 1923 when grouping saw the Great Eastern Railway taken over by the London and North Eastern Railway.

The July 1922 Bradshaw's Guide showed seven up services (towards Ipswich) and seven down services calling at the station, with two services each way on Sundays. Most services were local trains which would originate or terminate at Ipswich and call at most stations on the East Suffolk Line. However, the station did enjoy a main line service direct to Liverpool Street. Bradshaw's stated that the 08:17 departure conveyed first and third class Pullman carriages (there was no second class at this time), arriving in Liverpool Street at 10:30. The return working was at 15:18, arriving back in Bealings at 17:22.

From 1916 the station was the railhead for Martlesham Heath Airfield. In 1919 the goods yard was recorded as having three roads one of which served a small goods shed (the building on the left-hand side of the picture).

After World War II the railways were nationalised and Bealings station became part of British Railways' Eastern Region. Lack of patronage saw the station close in September 1956 and the goods yard followed in April 1965. The signal box (opened in 1884 with 18 levers for signals and points) remained in use, however, as a block post to divide up the Westerfield-Woodbridge section and to operate the level crossing gates. The box lasted until 1984, when it was closed as a result of the introduction of RETB (Radio Electronic Token Block) signalling on the East Suffolk line; at the same time, the manual level crossing gates were replaced by the current automatic half-barriers. The station building is still extant today and is occupied by the Mallard Business Centre.

Former Services

Preceding station	Disused railways	Following station
Westerfield; Line and station open	Great Eastern Railway; East Suffolk Line	Woodbridge; Line and station open
