= East Suffolk line =

Railway line in Suffolk, England

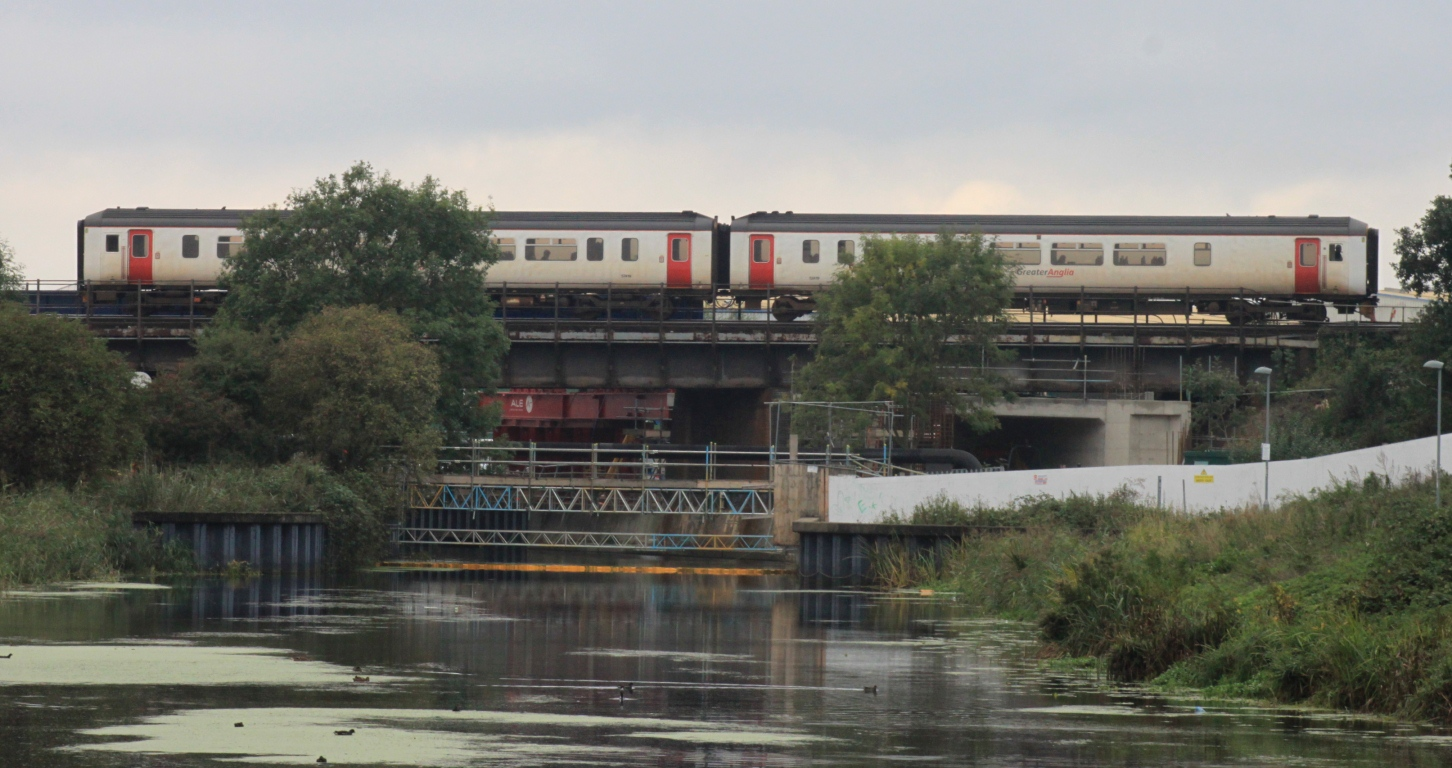
- 156419 crossing a bridge near Boss Hall

Overview
- Status: Operational
- Owner: Network Rail
- Locale: Suffolk, East of England
- Termini: Ipswich; Lowestoft
- Stations: 12

Service
- Type: Heavy rail
- System: National Rail
- Operator(s): Greater Anglia
- Rolling stock: Class 755 FLIRT; Former rolling stock: British Rail classes 153, 156 and 170

History
- Opened: 1854

Technical
- Line length: 48 miles 75 chains (78.8 km)
- Number of tracks: 1-2
- Character: Rural branch line
- Track gauge: 4 ft 8 1/2 in (1,435 mm) standard gauge
- Operating speed: 55 mph (89 km/h)
Route map
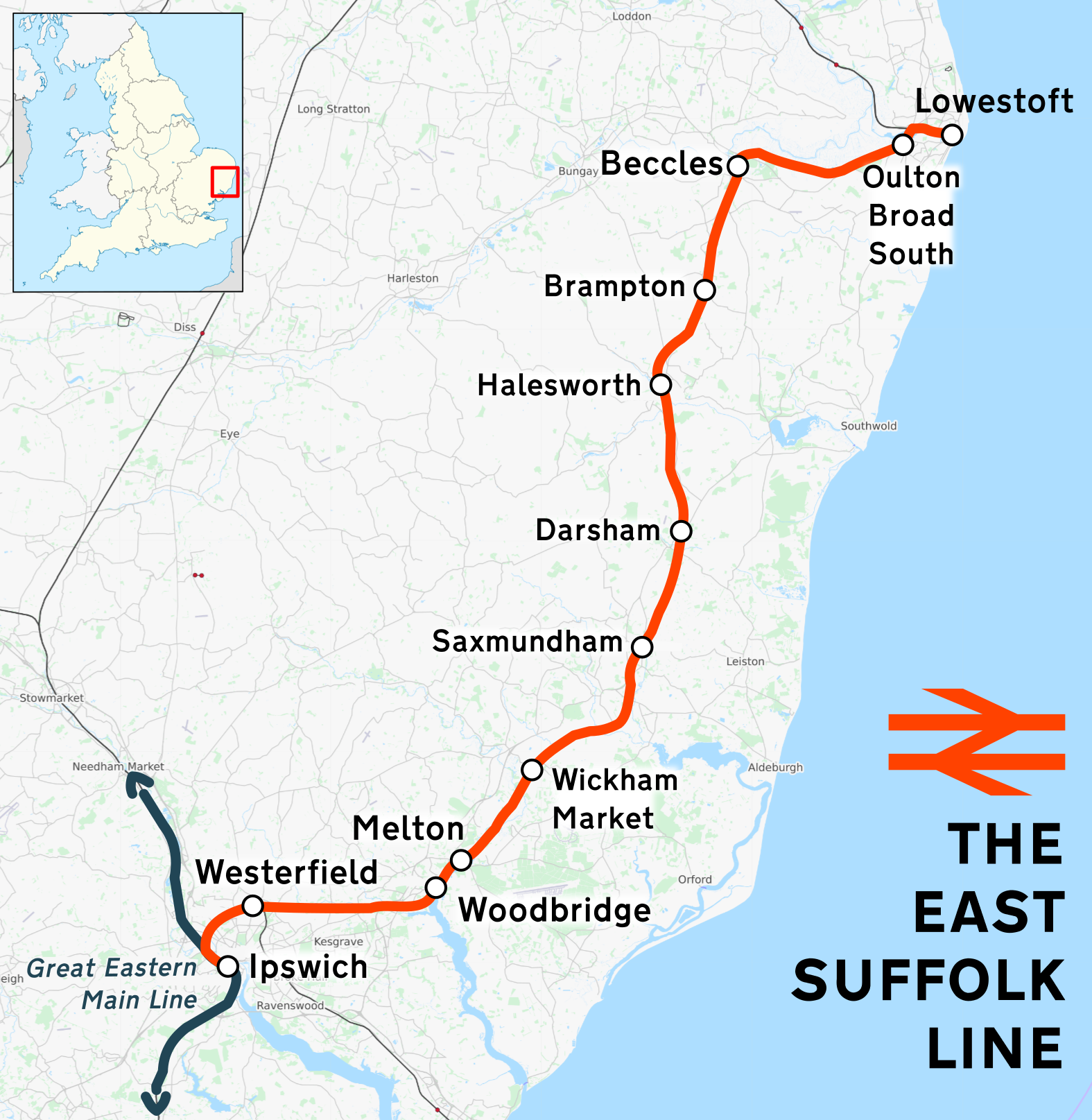
(Click to expand)

The East Suffolk line is an un-electrified 49-mile secondary railway line running between Ipswich and Lowestoft in Suffolk, England. The traffic along the route consists of passenger services operated by Greater Anglia, while nuclear flask trains for the Sizewell nuclear power stations are operated by Direct Rail Services.

The Halesworth, Beccles and Haddiscoe Railway opened between those points in 1854, and the East Suffolk Railway took over and extended southwards to Ipswich and north and east to Lowestoft and Great Yarmouth, opening in 1859, and forming a more direct route to London from the coastal towns. There were branches to Framlingham, Snape Bridge and in 1860 to Aldeburgh. In 1862 the East Suffolk Railway company was folded into the new Great Eastern Railway.

The GER operated a successful passenger and goods train service, and with the development of seaside holidays in the latter part of the nineteenth century, and further in the twentieth, the seasonal passenger traffic increased considerably; goods traffic was limited by the predominantly rural and agricultural topography, with some notable pockets of industry, and considerable fishery traffic.

After 1945 use of the line declined and costs escalated sharply, and it appeared likely that the network would be closed, but the East Suffolk Railway main line was reprieved in 1966. Pioneering cost reduction measures were implemented from that time and in later years, and through express trains were moved to other routes. Sizewell nuclear power stations brought construction traffic to the line, and nuclear flasks are still handled at intervals. At present the line carries an hourly passenger service, consisting of British Rail class 755 bi-mode multiple units.

== History ==
The Lowestoft and Beccles Railway and the Yarmouth and Haddiscoe Railway were incorporated into the East Suffolk Railway by the East Suffolk Railway Companies Amalgamation Act 1858 (21 & 22 Vict. c. cxi). The combined network opened a year later. It later became part of the Great Eastern Railway. A branch to Southwold operated between 1879 and 1929.

In the 1950s and 1960s, the Snape and Beccles branches closed and the line was rationalised under the Beeching Axe. From the 1960s onwards, construction trains and later atomic flask trains ran on a branch from Saxmundham to Sizewell nuclear power station.

== Recent infrastructure developments ==
Until October 2012, the section from Westerfield to Oulton Broad was signalled using Radio Electronic Token Block controlled from Saxmundham. However, due to radio frequency licensing issues, and the imminent beginning of an hourly train service on the line, which would have been beyond the capacity of RETB, Track Circuit Block signalling (using AzLM axle counters) has replaced the RETB system, after the last train on 19 October 2012. The new signalling came into operation on 23 October 2012, controlled from the existing signal box at Saxmundham. On 10 December 2012 a new passing loop and reinstated second platform opened at Beccles.

In December 2010 through trains from Lowestoft to London via the East Suffolk Line were terminated. From December 2012 an hourly service over the East Suffolk line was introduced following the completion of the passing loop at Beccles.

=== Bacon Factory Curve ===
A connecting curve from north to east near East Suffolk Junction opened in 2014. The 1.2 km (3/4 mi) line north-west of Ipswich railway station makes a direct connection between the East Suffolk Line and the Great Eastern Main Line and removed the need for Midlands freight trains travelling to and from Felixstowe to run round in sidings. It is a double track chord and was built on part of the site of a former Harris meat factory and has been given the official name Bacon Factory Curve. The connections at each end have been named Europa Junction (at the GER main line end) and Boss Hall Junction (at the Westerfield Road end). It reduced the number of freight trains running south from Ipswich to access the Midlands via the North London Line by enabling easier access to the line via Bury St Edmunds and March. It is commonly nicknamed "the Bacon bend" or "the Harris curve" by locals to the area.

== Current services ==
The route has a regular hourly passenger service from Ipswich to Lowestoft, operated by three- or four-coach Class 755 bi-mode multiple units.

Services from Felixstowe operate between Westerfield and Ipswich East Suffolk Junction on the south end of the line, and this section is also extremely busy with container trains to and from the Port of Felixstowe. The only other freight services run to Sizewell power station.

== Accidents ==
On 26 September 1865 a light engine returning from Great Yarmouth to Ipswich derailed between Darsham and Halesworth, killing the driver and fireman.

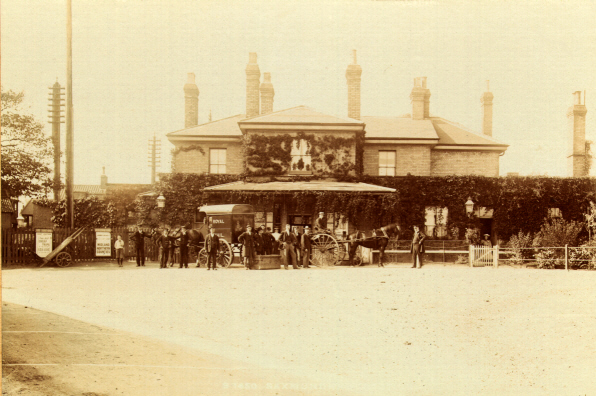
Saxmundham Station circa 1901

At 8.45 am on 25 September 1900 a GER Class Y14 0-6-0 locomotive no 522 suffered a boiler explosion at Westerfield, killing the driver John Barnard and his fireman William Macdonald. The boiler was thrown 40 yards forwards, over the level crossing, and ended up on the down platform. The locomotive had a history of boiler problems. The victims were buried in Ipswich cemetery and both their gravestones have a likeness of a Y14 0-6-0 carved onto them.

On 1 January 1927 there was a train crash at Woodbridge station. A wagon coupling had broken at Bealings and when the engine stopped at Woodbridge, the rear portion running downhill smashed into the back of the stationary train. One minor injury was recorded.

== Current route ==
The line today runs north from Ipswich via Westerfield, Woodbridge, Melton, Wickham Market, Saxmundham, Darsham, Halesworth, Brampton, Beccles, Oulton Broad South, and Lowestoft. It connects with the Great Eastern Main Line at Ipswich, the Felixstowe branch line at Westerfield, the line to Sizewell Power Station at Saxmundham, and the Norwich line at Lowestoft; the passenger service on the Norwich route is marketed as the Wherry Lines.

The line is double track from Ipswich to Woodbridge and then single to Saxmundham; from there it is double track as far as Halesworth, and then single again. There is a passing loop at Beccles, but the single line continues as far as Oulton Broad North Junction, where it joins the line from Norwich for the final entry to Lowestoft. The line is not electrified; it has a loading gauge of W10 between Ipswich and Westerfield and W6 for all other sections, and a maximum permissible speed of line of 55 mph.

=== Location list ===
Main line:

- (Ipswich)
- East Suffolk Junction
- Westerfield: opened 1 June 1859
- Bealings; opened 1 June 1859; closed 17 September 1956
- Woodbridge; opened 1 June 1859
- Melton; opened 1 June 1859; closed 2 May 1955; reopened 3 September 1984
- Wickham Market (in Campsea Ashe); opened 1 June 1859
- Snape Junction
- Saxmundham; opened 1 June 1859
- Darsham; opened 1 June 1859
- Halesworth; opened 4 December 1854; closed 15 May 1858; reopened 1 June 1859
- Brampton; opened 4 December 1854; closed 15 May 1858; reopened 1 June 1859
- Beccles; opened 4 December 1854; closed 15 May 1858; reopened 1 June 1859
- Aldeby; opened 4 December 1854; closed 15 May 1858; reopened 1 June 1859; closed 2 November 1959
- Fleet Junction
- Haddiscoe High Level; opened as St Olaves Junction 1 June 1859; renamed Herringfleet Junction 1891; renamed Haddiscoe High Level 1904: closed 2 November 1959
- St Olaves; opened 1 June 1859; closed 2 November 1959
- Belton and Burgh; opened as Belton 1 June 1859; renamed Belton & Burgh 1923; closed 2 November 1959
- Yarmouth South Town; opened 1 June 1859; closed 4 May 1970

Framlingham branch:

- (Wickham Market); as above
- Marlesford; opened 1 June 1859; closed 3 November 1952
- Hacheston Halt; opened 1922; closed 3 November 1952
- Parham; opened 1 June 1859; closed 3 November 1952
- Framlingham; opened 1 June 1859; closed 3 November 1952; subsequently used for school and ramblers' excursions

Snape branch line:

- Snape Junction; as above
- Snape (goods), opened 1 June 1859; closed 7 March 1960

Aldeburgh branch line:

- (Saxmundham); as above
- Leiston; opened 1 June 1859; closed 12 September 1966
- Thorpeness; opened 29 July 1914; closed 12 September 1966
- Aldeburgh; opened as Aldborough 12 April 1860; renamed Aldeburgh 1 June 1875; closed 12 September 1966

Lowestoft and Beccles railway:

- (Beccles); as above;
- Oulton Broad South; opened as Carlton Colville 1 June 1859; renamed Oulton Broad South 26 September 1927
- Lowestoft; opened 1 July 1847; renamed Lowestoft Central 1 October 1903; renamed Lowestoft 3 May 1971

Haddiscoe to Lowestoft link (via the Lowestoft Railway):

- Somerleyton; opened 1 July 1847
- Oulton Broad North; opened as Mutford 1 July 1847; renamed Oulton Broad (Mutford) 1881; renamed Oulton Broad November 1915; renamed Oulton Broad North 26 November 1927
- to Lowestoft; as above

Haddiscoe connection:

- Fleet Junction; as above
- Haddiscoe Junction
- (to Haddiscoe; used by HB&HR trains from 4 December 1854 until 15 May 1858).

== Operations ==
Greater Anglia passenger services are operated by Class 755 "FLIRT". Freight to Sizewell on the former Aldeburgh branch line is typically operated by Class 37 or Class 20s, while Class 66 and Class 70s work trains to Felixstowe.

=== Signal boxes ===
The following is a list of signal boxes operational during the steam and early years of the diesel era. They are listed south to north and in 2023 only Saxmundham is still operational.

- East Suffolk Junction – junction for the main Norwich to London Liverpool Street line. Closed in 1986 re-signalling of main line.
- Westerfield Bank (1898–1926)
- Westerfield Junction
- Bealings (1884–1984)
- Woodbridge
- Melton
- Wickham Market
- Wickham Market Junction (for Framlingham branch)
- Saxmundham
- Saxmundham Junction (demolished 1972)
- Darsham
- Halesworth
- Brampton
- Beccles Bank (1885–1958: destroyed by fire). Box provided to allow for banking locomotive operation for heavy trains.
- Beccles South
- Beccles North
- Lowestoft Line Junction (1859–1896).
- Barnby Siding (1890–1960s)
- Oulton Broad South (Carlton Colville)
- Lowestoft
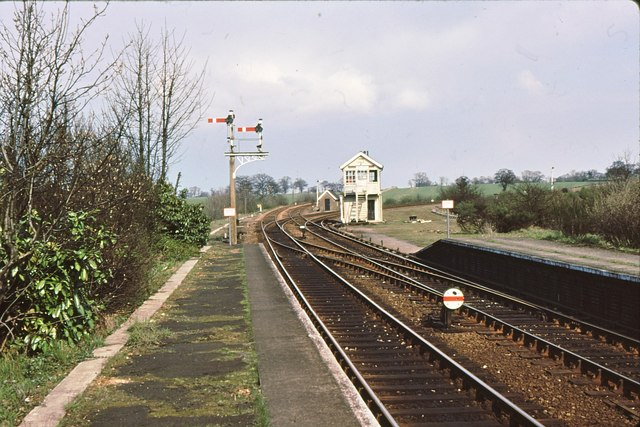
Westerfield Junction signal box in 1979.

=== Previous infrastructure items ===
Two of the stations on the line had level crossings incorporated into the platforms. At Saxmundham the original down platform (the platforms here were staggered rather than opposite each other) required extension for longer trains and rather than close the Chantry Road, the platform acted as a gate and were swung across the railway when road access was required. A train hit the road gate in the early 1960s and the platform was replaced by more conventional gates. By this time the railway had become a secondary route and the longer platform was not required.

A similar arrangement was at Halesworth where the platforms were extended in 1887. Increasing road traffic in the 1950s resulted in a new road bridge being built to the north of the station. The level crossing was closed in 1959 although the gates remained as part of the platform for some years.

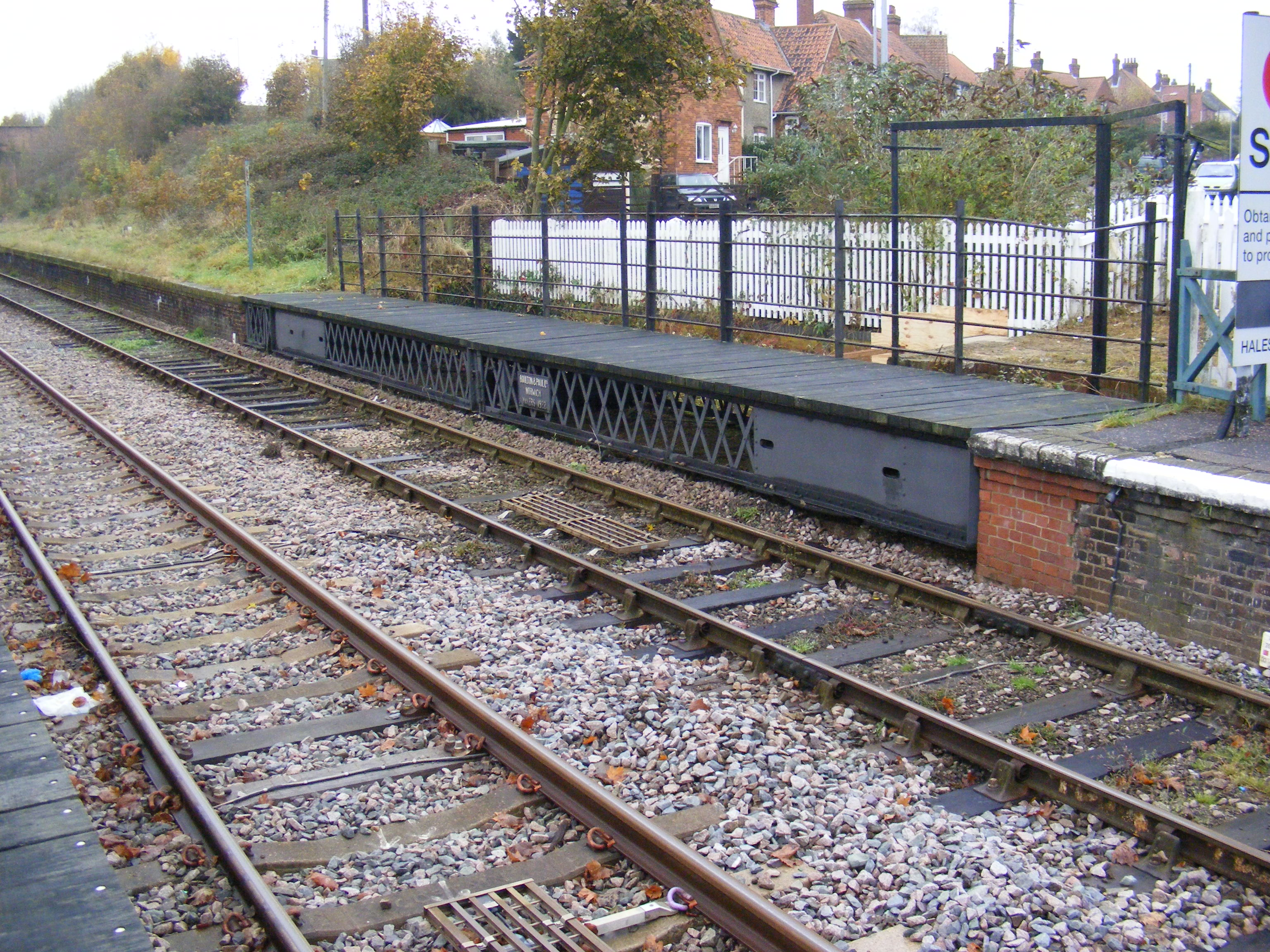
The movable platform at Halesworth station, c. 2008

At Beccles there was an unusual draw bridge arrangement which allowed milk churns and barrows to be moved from the main platform to the island platform. This was installed in 1933 and was located at the south end of the station. When not in use the bridge formed part of the platform surface.

At Woodbridge there was long siding (referred to as a tramway) which ran alongside the East Suffolk line for 41 chains (820 m) towards Melton. Serving a number of riverside industries and open until the 1950s it was notable as being worked by shunting horses rather than locomotives.

== Southwold Railway Trust ==
The Southwold Railway Trust is "committed to restoring the historic narrow gauge railway link between Halesworth & Southwold; preserving it for future generations to enjoy."
