= Woodbridge railway station =

Railway station in Suffolk, England

Woodbridge
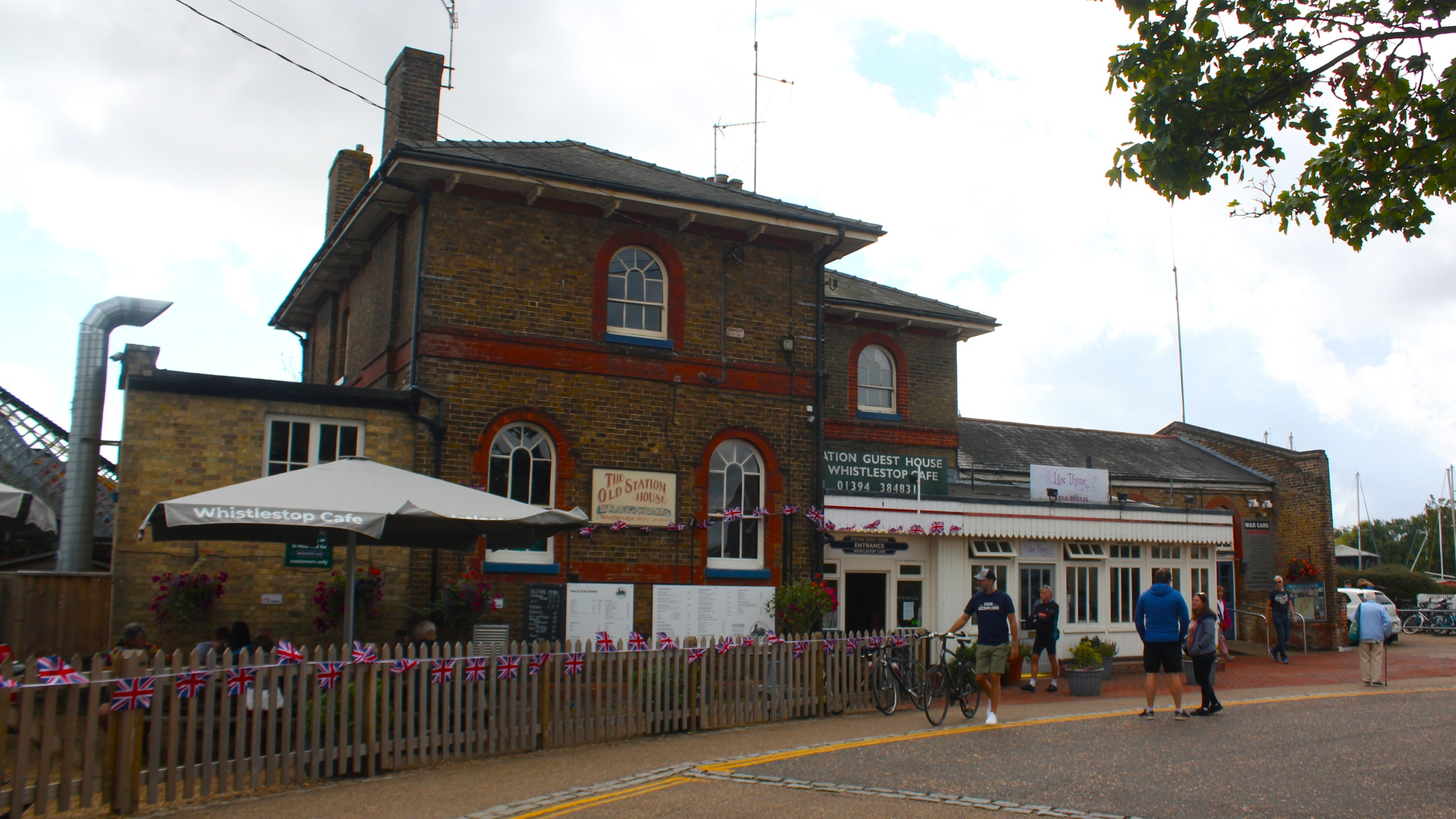

General information
- Location: Woodbridge, East Suffolk; England
- Coordinates: 52.090°N 1.318°E
- Grid reference: TM273487
- Managed by: Greater Anglia
- Platforms: 2

Other information
- Station code: WDB
- Classification: DfT category F1

History
- Original company: East Suffolk Railway
- Pre-grouping: Great Eastern Railway
- Post-grouping: London and North Eastern Railway

Key dates
- 1 June 1859: Opened
- 18 April 1966: Closed to freight

Passengers
- 2020/21: ▼50,570
- 2021/22: ▲0.169 million
- 2022/23: ▲0.190 million
- 2023/24: ▲0.209 million
- 2024/25: ▲0.229 million
Location
Notes
- Passenger statistics from the Office of Rail and Road

Woodbridge railway station is on the East Suffolk Line in the east of England, serving the town of Woodbridge, Suffolk. It is 10 miles 19 chains (16.5 km) down the line from Ipswich and 79 miles (127 km) measured from London Liverpool Street; it is situated between Westerfield and Melton. Its three-letter station code is WDB.

The station was opened in 1859. Today it is managed by Greater Anglia, which also operates all trains that call.

== History ==
The railway line connecting the East Suffolk Railway (ESR) at Halesworth with the Eastern Union Railway (EUR) (although since 1854 this had been leased by the Eastern Counties Railway) at Ipswich was built in two parts: the portion of this line south of Woodbridge was built by the EUR; Woodbridge station and the portion of line north of there was built by the ESR. The line opened on 1 June 1859, and Woodbridge station opened with the line. The ESR was absorbed by the ECR on opening day. The station buildings were designed by Frederick Barnes, who also designed other Suffolk stations such as Thurston, Elmswell and Bealings.

On 1 July 1862, the ECR and other small railway companies amalgamated to become the Great Eastern Railway (GER). At the 1923 Grouping, the GER was amalgamated with other companies to form the London and North Eastern Railway; this in turn was a constituent of British Railways at the start of 1948.

On 1 January 1927 there was a train crash at Woodbridge station. A wagon coupling had broken at Bealings and when the engine stopped at Woodbridge, the rear portion running downhill smashed into the back of the stationary train. Only one minor injury was recorded.

The station's goods yard closed on 18 April 1966. The ticket office closed with the introduction of Paytrains on 7 March 1967.

With the privatisation of British Rail, ownership of the line and station passed to Railtrack on 1 April 1994. The franchise to operate the passenger services on this route was won by Anglia Railways in 1997; in 2004 National Express won the franchise and operated services using the branding 'one', which was renamed National Express East Anglia in 2008. In 2012, the franchise passed to the current operator, Abellio Greater Anglia.

On 28 January 2003 a train collided with a car on the ungated level crossing leading to the marina.

On 13 December 2010 a train hit a car on a level crossing close to Woodbridge station.

In spring 2021 due to the increasing number of people using the crossings, the barriers at Haywards and Ferry Lane level crossings were upgraded to full barriers making them safer.

== Services ==
As of December 2019, the typical Monday-Sunday off-peak service at Woodbridge is as follows:

Operator	Route	Rolling stock	Typical frequency
Abellio Greater Anglia	Lowestoft - Oulton Broad South - Beccles - Brampton (on request) - Halesworth - Darsham - Saxmundham - Wickham Market - Melton - Woodbridge - Ipswich	Class 755	1x per hour in each direction

Direct trains to and from London Liverpool Street were withdrawn in 2010.

One weekday early-morning train is extended through to Harwich International, with a return journey in the evening.

== Notes ==
- Adwent, Colin (11 April 2011). "Woodbridge: Driver to face court after rail crash probe". Ipswich Star.
- Allen, Cecil J. (1956) [1955]. The Great Eastern Railway (2nd ed.). Hampton Court: Ian Allan.
- "Car and train collide at crossing". BBC News. 28 January 2003.
- Butt, R.V.J. (1995). The Directory of Railway Stations. Yeovil: Patrick Stephens Ltd. ISBN 1-85260-508-1. R508.
- Cooper, John M (1982). East Suffolk Railway. Oakwood Press. ISBN 085361-285-4.
- McCarthy, Colin; McCarthy, David; Cobb, Michael (August 2007). Waller, Peter (ed.). Norfolk and Suffolk. Railways of Britain. Hersham: Ian Allan. ISBN 978-0-7110-3223-1. 0708/c1.
- "Suffolk level crossings to get safety upgrades". Network Rail. 27 February 2021.

Preceding station	National Rail	Following station
Melton	Abellio Greater Anglia East Suffolk Line	Westerfield
	Historical railways	
Melton Line and station open	Great Eastern Railway East Suffolk Railway	Bealings Line open, station closed
