= Brampton railway station (Suffolk) =

Railway station in Suffolk, England

Brampton
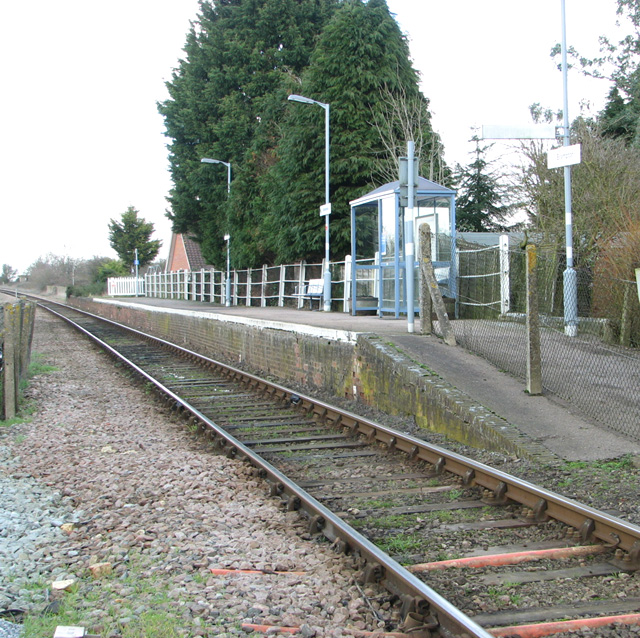

General information
- Location: Redisham, East Suffolk; England
- Coordinates: 52.3954°N 1.5437°E
- Grid reference: TM411834
- Manager: Greater Anglia
- Platforms: 1

Other information
- Station code: BRP
- Classification: DfT category F1

History
- Original company: East Suffolk Railway
- Pre-grouping: Great Eastern Railway
- Post-grouping: London and North Eastern Railway

Key dates
- 4 December 1854: Opened as Brampton
- 15 May 1858: Closed
- 1 June 1859: Re-opened
- 1 June 1928: Renamed Brampton (Suffolk)

Passengers
- 2021/22: ▲7,674
- 2022/23: ▲9,390
- 2023/24: ▲11,920
- 2024/25: ▲14,508
- 2025/26: ▼14,050
Location
Notes
- Passenger statistics from the Office of Rail and Road

Brampton railway station is on the East Suffolk Line in the east of England, serving the villages of Brampton, Redisham and surrounding hamlets in Suffolk. It is 35 miles 70 chains (57.7 km) down the line from Ipswich and 104 miles 49 chains (168.4 km) measured from London Liverpool Street; it is situated between Halesworth and Beccles. It is commonly suffixed as Brampton (Suffolk) in order to distinguish it from the station of the same name in Cumbria.

Brampton and the line is served by one train per hour in each direction between Ipswich and Lowestoft. It is managed by Greater Anglia, which also operates all the trains.

== History ==
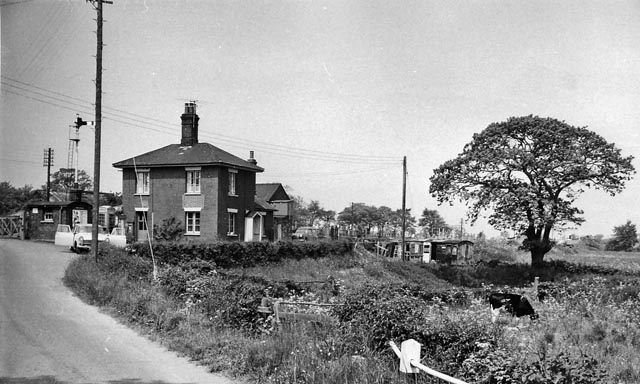
The station in 1963

The railway line between Halesworth and Haddiscoe was opened by the East Suffolk Railway (ESR) on 4 December 1854, and the station at Brampton was opened on the same day.

The ESR was absorbed by the Eastern Counties Railway in 1859, which in turn was amalgamated with other railways to form the Great Eastern Railway (GER) in 1862. The GER's successor, the London and North Eastern Railway, added the county suffix "(Suffolk)" on 1 June 1928.

The station featured in "No Trace of Tracy", the fourth episode of the first series of Jonathan Creek.

== Services ==
As of December 2019 the typical Monday-Sunday off-peak service at Brampton is as follows:

Operator	Route	Rolling stock	Typical frequency
Abellio Greater Anglia	Lowestoft - Oulton Broad South - Beccles - Brampton - Halesworth - Darsham - Saxmundham - Wickham Market - Melton - Woodbridge - Ipswich	Class 755	1x per hour in each direction

One weekday early-morning train is extended through to Harwich International and there is a return from there in the evening.

Preceding station	National Rail	Following station
Halesworth	Abellio Greater Anglia East Suffolk Line	Beccles
