= Wickham Market railway station =

Railway station in Suffolk, England

Wickham Market
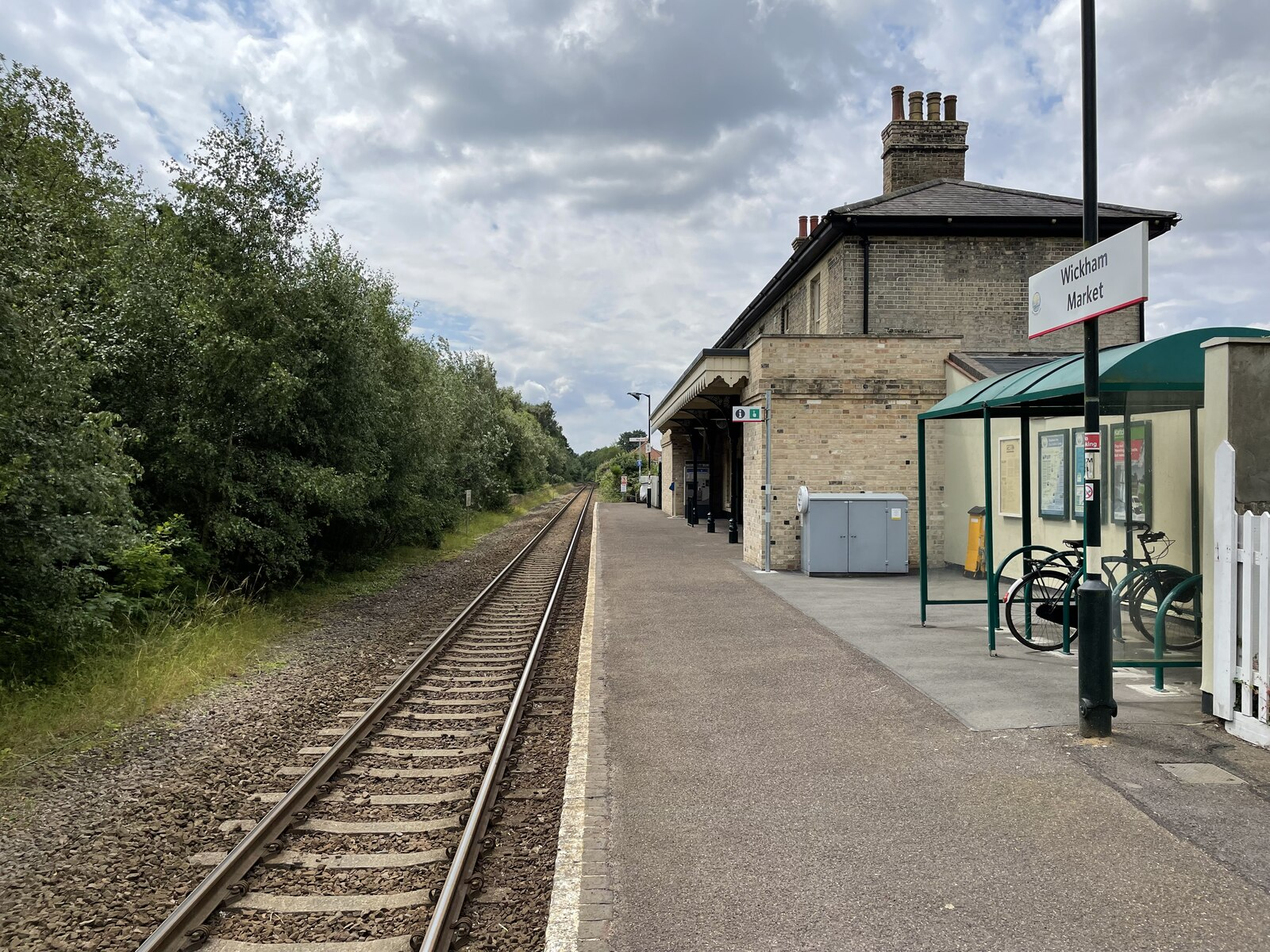

General information
- Location: Campsea Ashe, East Suffolk; England
- Coordinates: 52.1510°N 1.3987°E
- Grid reference: TM326557
- Managed by: Greater Anglia
- Platforms: 1

Other information
- Station code: WCM
- Classification: DfT category F1

History
- Original company: East Suffolk Railway
- Pre-grouping: Great Eastern Railway
- Post-grouping: London and North Eastern Railway

Key dates
- 1 June 1859: Opened

Passengers
- 2020/21: ▼11,570
- 2021/22: ▲47,570
- 2022/23: ▲57,274
- 2023/24: ▲62,200
- 2024/25: ▲67,636
Location
Notes
- Passenger statistics from the Office of Rail and Road

Wickham Market railway station is on the East Suffolk Line in the east of England, located in Campsea Ashe, Suffolk, approximately 2 miles (3.2 km) east of Wickham Market itself. The station is 15 miles 64 chains (25.4 km) down the line from Ipswich and 84 miles 43 chains (136 km) measured from London Liverpool Street; it is situated between Melton and Saxmundham. Its three-letter station code is WCM.

It is managed by Abellio Greater Anglia, which also operates all trains that call.

Wickham Market was formerly a junction for the Framlingham branch line. The branch closed to passenger services in November 1952, and to freight in April 1965.

== History ==
The railway line connecting the East Suffolk Railway (ESR) at Halesworth to an extension of the Eastern Counties Railway (ECR) at Woodbridge was built by the ESR, as was the Framlingham branch. The main line and the Framlingham branch both opened on 1 June 1859, and Wickham Market station opened at the same time. The ESR was absorbed by the ECR on opening day.

On 1 July 1862, the ECR and other small railway companies were amalgamated to form the Great Eastern Railway (GER). Upon the 1923 Grouping, the GER was combined with other railways into the London and North Eastern Railway; this in turn was a constituent of British Railways at the start of 1948.

The Framlingham branch closed to passenger trains in November 1952; it retained freight services until April 1965. In the meantime, the goods yard at Wickham Market closed in July 1964.

With the privatisation of British Rail, ownership of the line and station passed to Railtrack on 1 April 1994. The franchise to operate the passenger services on this route was won by Anglia Railways in 1997; in 2004 National Express won the franchise and operated services using the brand name 'one', which was renamed National Express East Anglia in 2008. In February 2012, the operation of the train service was taken over by Abellio Greater Anglia, a company run by Abellio, the trading name of Dutch railways.

== Services ==
As of December 2020 the typical Monday-Sunday off-peak service at Wickham Market is as follows:

Operator	Route	Rolling stock	Typical frequency
Abellio Greater Anglia	Lowestoft - Oulton Broad South - Beccles - Brampton (on request) - Halesworth - Darsham - Saxmundham - Wickham Market - Melton - Woodbridge - Ipswich	Class 755	1x per hour in each direction

Trains direct to and from London Liverpool Street were withdrawn in 2010.

One weekday early-morning train is extended through to Harwich International and there is a return from there in the evening.

== Notes ==
Preceding station	National Rail	Following station
Saxmundham	Abellio Greater Anglia East Suffolk Line	Melton
Disused railways
Terminus	Great Eastern Railway Framlingham Branch	Marlesford Line and station closed
