= Oulton Broad South railway station =

Railway station in Suffolk, England

Oulton Broad South
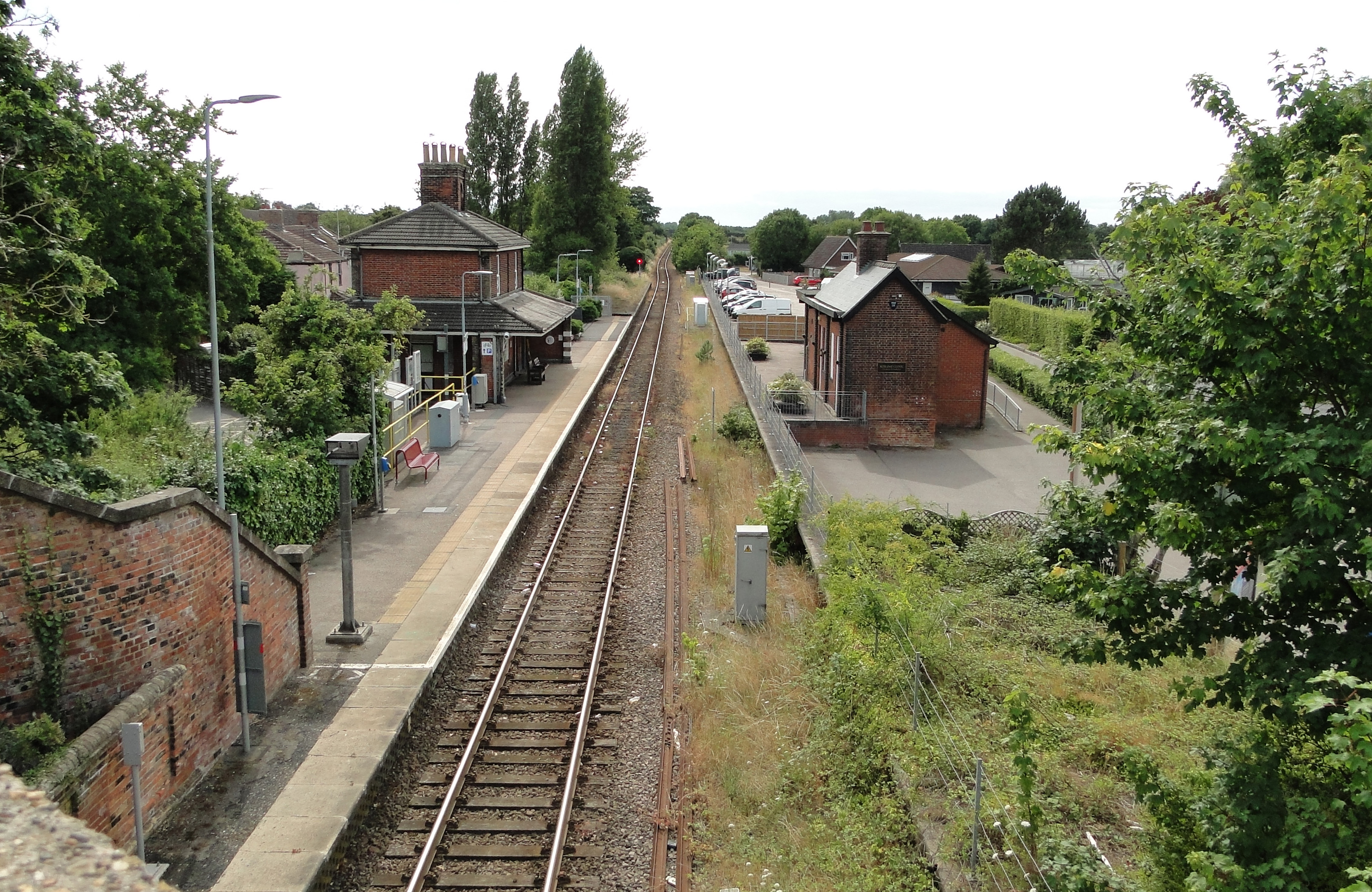
- Oulton Broad South in 2022

General information
- Location: Oulton Broad, East Suffolk; England
- Coordinates: 52.4696°N 1.7076°E
- Grid reference: TM518922
- Managed by: Greater Anglia
- Platforms: 1

Other information
- Station code: OUS
- Classification: DfT category F2

History
- Original company: East Suffolk Railway
- Pre-grouping: Great Eastern Railway
- Post-grouping: London and North Eastern Railway

Key dates
- 1 June 1859: Opened as Carlton Colville
- 26 September 1927: Renamed Oulton Broad South

Passengers
- 2020/21: ▼7,212
- 2021/22: ▲45,430
- 2022/23: ▲51,210
- 2023/24: ▲56,484
- 2024/25: ▲60,488
Location
Notes
- Passenger statistics from the Office of Rail and Road

Oulton Broad South railway station (originally Carlton Colville) is on the East Suffolk Line in the east of England, and is one of two stations serving Oulton Broad, Suffolk. The other is Oulton Broad North on the Wherry Lines. Oulton Broad South is the next station along from Lowestoft on the line to Ipswich, and from Lowestoft the line crosses Mutford Bridge with a view of Lake Lothing to the east and Oulton Broad Lake to the west. The station is 115 miles 42 chains (185.9 km) measured from London Liverpool Street via Ipswich.

It is managed by Greater Anglia, which also operates all trains that call.

== History ==
The station was opened on 1 June 1859 as Carlton Colville by the East Suffolk Railway when it opened the line between Lowestoft and Beccles. The line had been promoted by the Lowestoft and Beccles Railway but they were acquired by the East Suffolk Railway on 23 July 1858, before the line opened.

The station was renamed Oulton Broad South on 26 September 1927. At least one camping coach was positioned here by the Eastern Region from 1952 to 1965, from 1955 to 1960 there were two coaches and three in 1961, from 1961 they were all Pullman camping coaches.

The station was part of the 1984 modernisation of the East Suffolk Line. By 1986, the line was equipped with automated level crossings and radio signalling. However, to ensure the line's survival, two sections were also singled.

At the eastern end of the platforms the lines passed under a main road from Beccles to Oulton Broad, and just east of this point the line to Lowestoft had a junction to the Kirkley branch, a single-track branch line designed to service a number of sites on the southern side of Lake Lothing. This line also served the Kirkley goods depot adjacent to Beaconsfield Road and the Fen Park. The branch was closed in stages during the 1960s and 1970s, as some of the larger businesses it served also closed down. The line from Durban Road to the goods yards was closed in 1967, although much of the track remained in place until the final closure of the line on 31 December 1972. The final section of the goods yard from the bridge in Mill Road is now a car park, and a school playing field occupies the site of the other four-siding yard near the park. The line adjacent to the junction with the East Suffolk Line is now a residential caravan site, although the remains of the track bed continue along Victoria Road heading east. Numerous properties have been built on sections of this line.

The signal box at the junction was demolished and no trace remains. Signalling functions were transferred to the box at Oulton Broad North.

== Services ==
As of December 2019 the typical Monday-Sunday off-peak service at Oulton Broad South is as follows:

| Operator | Route | Rolling stock | Typical frequency |
|---|---|---|---|
| Greater Anglia | Lowestoft - Oulton Broad South - Beccles - Brampton (on request) - Halesworth - Darsham - Saxmundham - Wickham Market - Melton - Woodbridge - Ipswich | Class 755 | 1x per hour in each direction |

Trains extending to and from London Liverpool Street were withdrawn in 2010.

One weekday early-morning train is extended through to Harwich International and there is a return from there in the evening.

| Preceding station | National Rail | Following station |
|---|---|---|
| Beccles | Greater Anglia East Suffolk Line | Lowestoft |
