= Halesworth railway station =

Railway station in Suffolk, England

Coordinates: 52.347°N 1.506°E

Halesworth
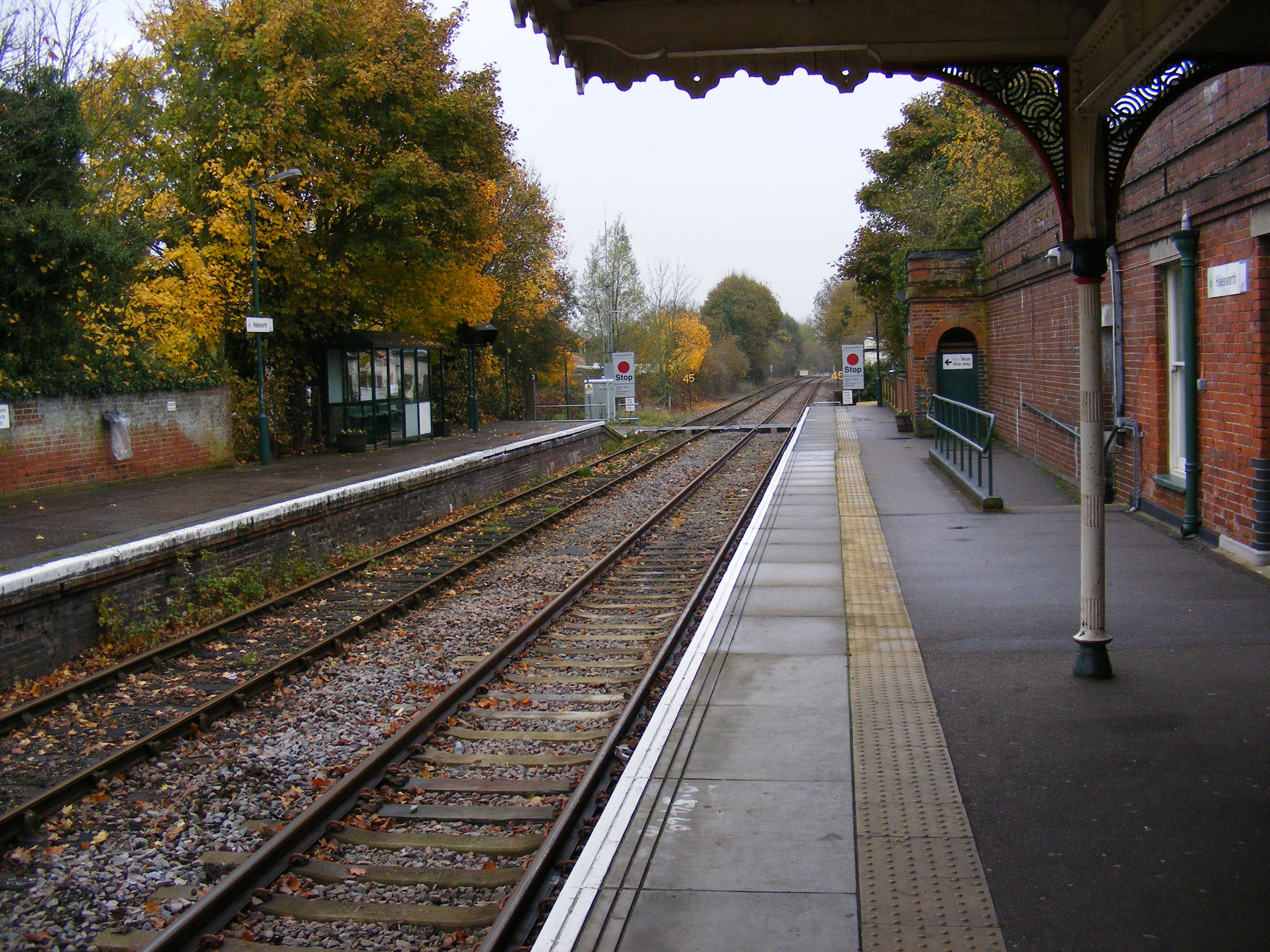

General information
- Location: Halesworth, East Suffolk; England
- Grid reference: TM388778
- Manager: Greater Anglia
- Platforms: 2

Other information
- Station code: HAS
- Classification: DfT category F1

History
- Original company: East Suffolk Railway
- Pre-grouping: Great Eastern Railway
- Post-grouping: London and North Eastern Railway

Key dates
- 4 December 1854: First station opened
- 15 May 1858: Closed
- 1 June 1859: Re-sited and re-opened

Passengers
- 2020/21: ▼15,854
- 2021/22: ▲84,792
- 2022/23: ▲99,576
- 2023/24: ▲107,644
- 2024/25: ▲124,996
Location
Notes
- Passenger statistics from the Office of Rail and Road

Halesworth railway station is on the East Suffolk Line in the east of England, serving the town of Halesworth, Suffolk. It is also the nearest station to the seaside town of Southwold. It is 31 miles 74 chains (51.4 km) down the line from Ipswich and 100 miles 53 chains (162.0 km) measured from London Liverpool Street; it is situated between Darsham and Brampton. Its three-letter station code is HAS.

It is managed by Greater Anglia, which also operates all trains that call.

== History ==
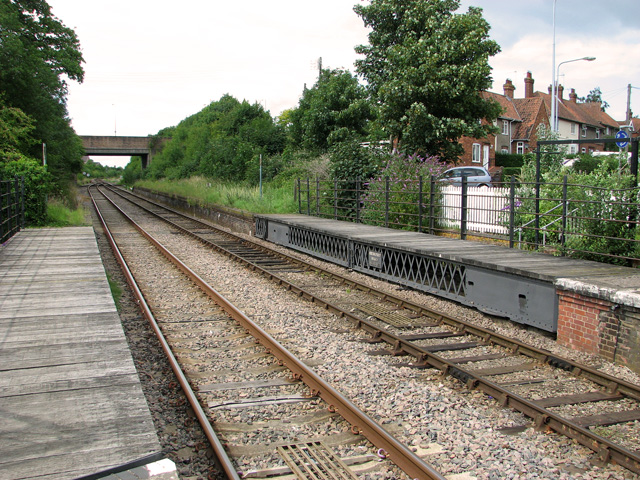
The "moveable platforms", still in use but fixed, 2011

The first station at Halesworth was opened in 1854 but closed four years later and a new station opened in 1859 on an adjacent site. The station was formerly situated on a level crossing. However, it was unusual in that the platforms swung across the road rather than having typical crossing gates. The crossing is now permanently closed, although the platforms are still in use.

The cabin from the mechanical signal box at Halesworth has been preserved at the Mangapps Railway Museum.

On the afternoon of 18 December 1941, a German Dornier bombed the station house, killing the stationmaster, his wife and their young maid. The station house was rebuilt at a reduced size.

The Halesworth and District Museum and the offices of Halesworth Area Community Transport now occupy the station building.

The station is unstaffed but has been "adopted" by volunteers from the East Suffolk Lines Community Rail Partnership who maintain the plantings and remove litter.

== Services ==
As of December 2019 the typical Monday–Sunday off-peak service at Halesworth is as follows:

Operator	Route	Rolling stock	Typical frequency
Abellio Greater Anglia	Lowestoft - Oulton Broad South - Beccles - Brampton (on request) - Halesworth - Darsham - Saxmundham - Wickham Market - Melton - Woodbridge - Ipswich	Class 755	1x per hour in each direction

Trains direct to and from London Liverpool Street were withdrawn in 2010.

One weekday early-morning train is extended through to Harwich International and there is a return from there in the evening.

== Southwold Railway ==
From 1879 to 1929 Halesworth was also the western terminus of the 3 ft (914 mm) gauge Southwold Railway which ran to Southwold.

The terminus was located alongside the main railway station, allowing cross-platform interchange of passengers and having transfer sheds for the exchange of goods between the narrow gauge wagons of the Southwold Railway and the standard gauge wagons used on the main line.

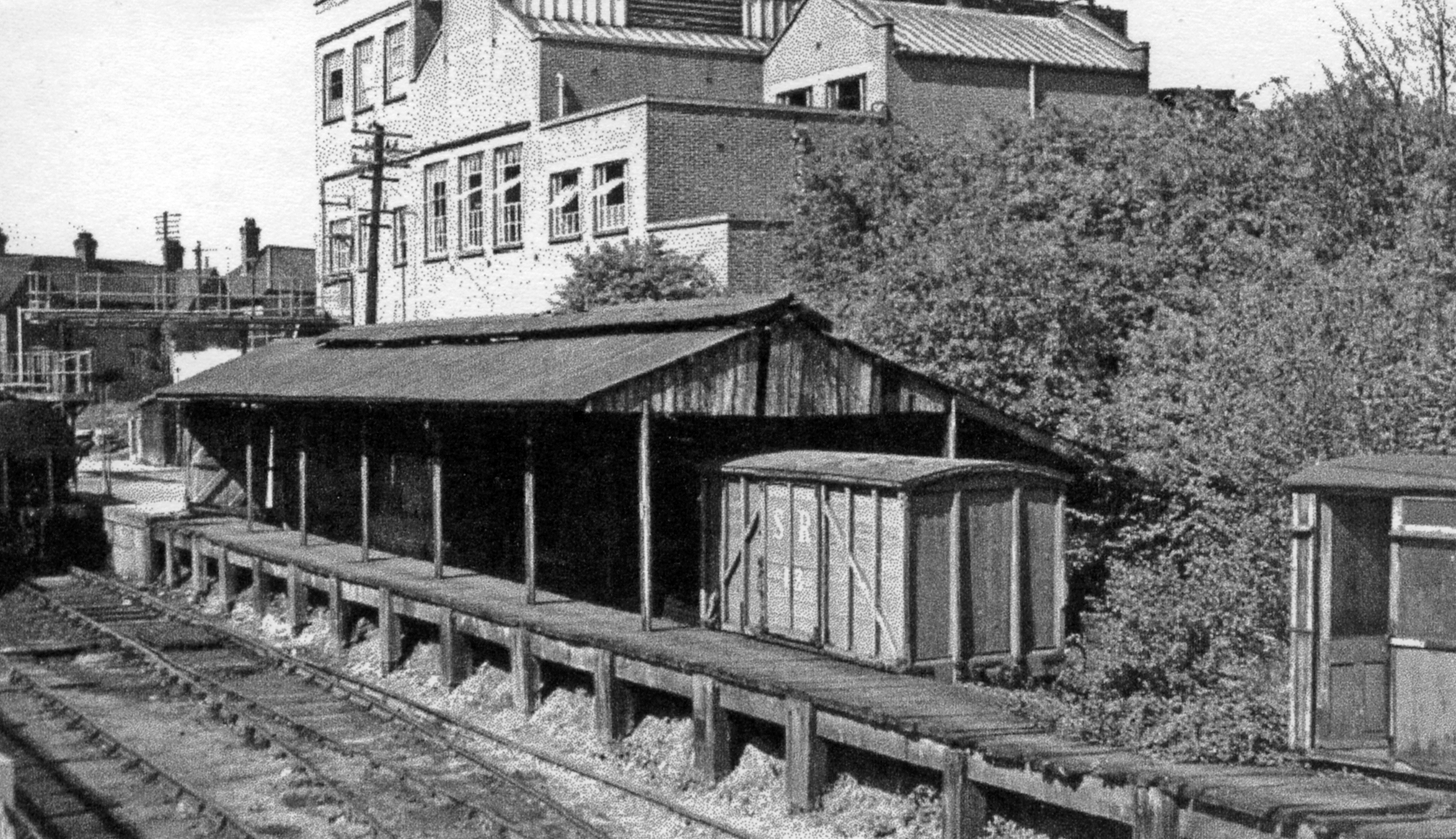
Disused terminal platforms of the former Southwold Railway at Halesworth, 1940

In 1933 a siding was laid to serve the dairy (the big building in the picture) and milk tanks ran from Halesworth to Ilford (London) on a daily basis. The dairy closed on 30 April 1968 although rail traffic may have ceased before that date.

Preceding station	National Rail	Following station
Brampton	Greater Anglia East Suffolk Line	Darsham
Disused railways
Interchange for the Southwold Railway
