= Beccles railway station =

Railway station in Suffolk, England

Beccles
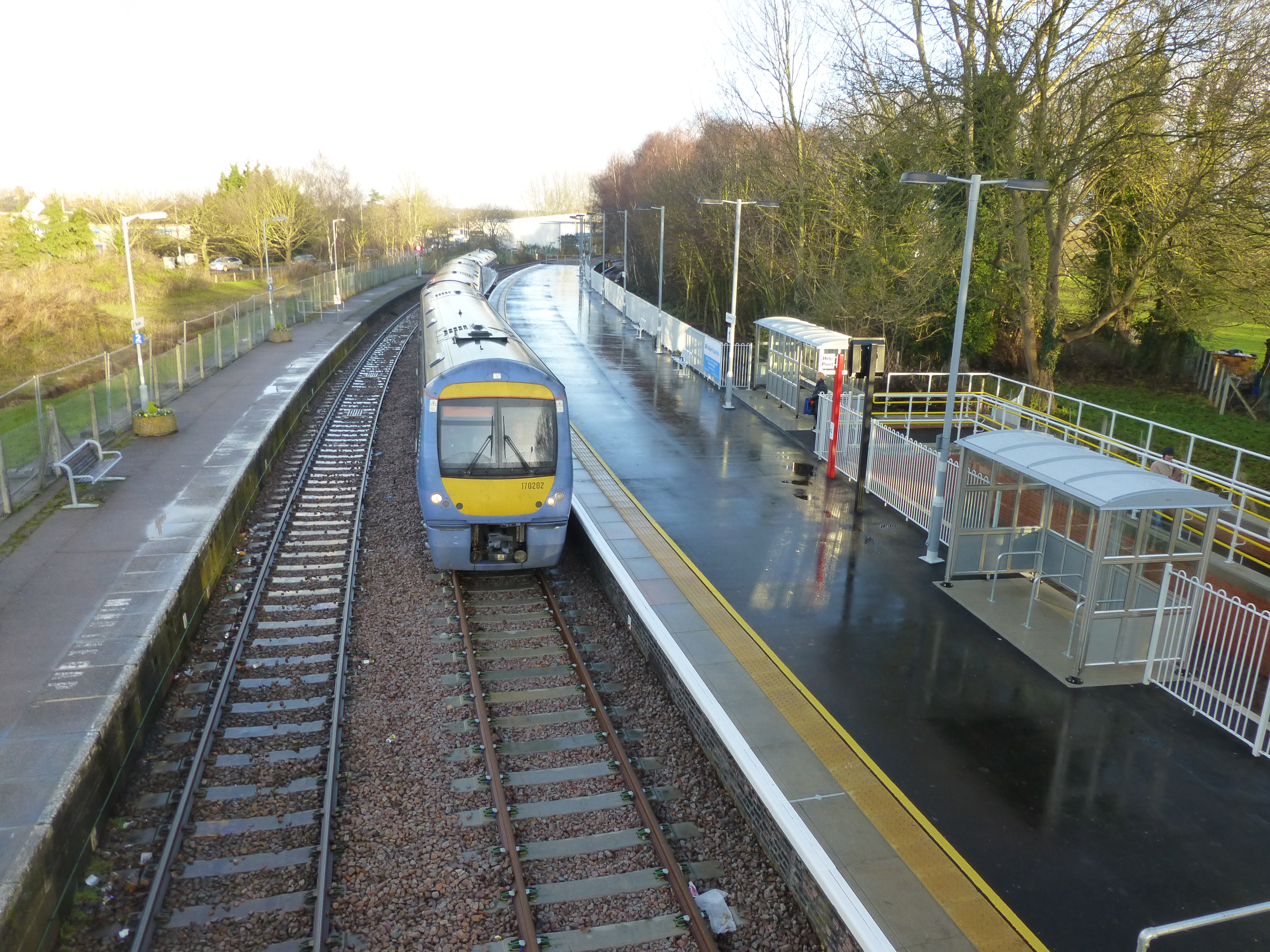

General information
- Location: Beccles, East Suffolk; England
- Coordinates: 52.4586°N 1.5697°E
- Grid reference: TM426904
- Owner: Network Rail
- Manager: Greater Anglia
- Platforms: 2

Other information
- Station code: BCC
- Classification: DfT category F1

History
- Original company: East Suffolk Railway
- Pre-grouping: Great Eastern Railway
- Post-grouping: London and North Eastern Railway

Key dates
- 4 December 1854: Opened
- 15 May 1858: Closed
- 1 June 1859: Reopened
- 31 January 1968: Closed to freight
- 10 December 2012: Passing loop opened

Passengers
- 2020/21: ▼17,682
- 2021/22: ▲97,838
- 2022/23: ▲0.112 million
- 2023/24: ▲0.118 million
- 2024/25: ▲0.130 million
Location
Notes
- Passenger statistics from the Office of Rail and Road

Beccles railway station is a stop on the East Suffolk Line in the east of England, serving the town of Beccles, Suffolk. It is 40 miles 34 chains (65.1 km) down the line from Ipswich and 109 miles 11 chains (175.6 km) from London Liverpool Street; it is situated between Brampton and Oulton Broad South stations. Its three-letter station code is BCC and is managed by Greater Anglia, which also operates all trains that call.

== History ==
=== Early years 1852-1922 ===
The East Suffolk Railway opened on 4 December 1854, operating between Haddiscoe and Halesworth. Built as a single line this was then closed in 1858 for doubling and extending to Woodbridge. The line was also extended to Ipswich and Yarmouth South Town in 1859. (Note: The line from East Suffolk Junction to Woodbridge was built by the Eastern Union Railway and provided the through route to Ipswich (originally serving the original station in Croft Street).)

The Beccles to Lowestoft branch (as it was then) opened in the same year and from opening all these lines were operated by the Eastern Counties Railway.

By the 1860s the railways in East Anglia were in financial trouble, and most were leased to the ECR; they wished to amalgamate formally, but could not obtain government agreement for this until 1862, when the Great Eastern Railway was formed by amalgamation. Thus Beccles became a GER station in 1862.

The Waveney Valley Line from Tivetshall on the Great Eastern Main Line reached Beccles in 1863, making the town an important junction on the expanding Great Eastern Railway network.

A station footbridge was provided in 1891 and an adjacent footbridge for a local footpath the following year.

By 1899 there were two sets of parallel tracks (four in total) running north of Beccles and the junction immediately north of Beccles would have been re-laid to enable trains to be routed to Lowestoft or Great Yarmouth South Town.

=== London & North East Railway (1923-1947) ===
Following the Railways Act 1921, the station became the responsibility of the London and North Eastern Railway from 1 January 1923.

In September 1939 Beccles station was one of nine stations in Suffolk designated to accept evacuated children and expectant mothers from cities thought to be targets for London bombers.

During World War II Beccles was a very busy location with additional trains and military personnel using the station.

=== The nationalisation era (1948-1994) ===
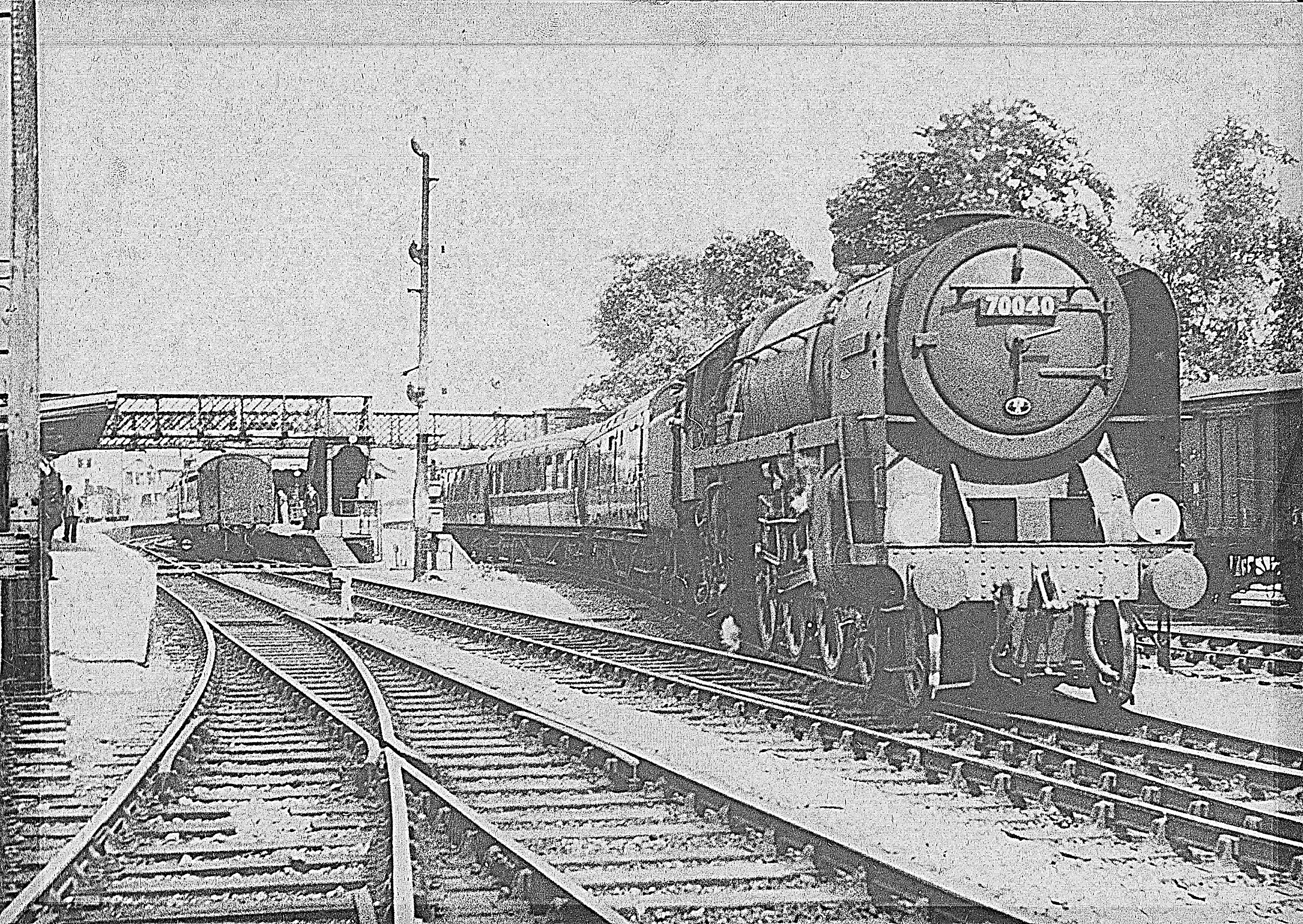
British Railways Britannia Class 4-6-2 number 70040 at Beccles railway station with an up departure from Platfrom2

Following railway nationalisation in 1948, the station transferred under British Railways to the Eastern Region.

The development of the road network and increased car ownership for personal and commercial use saw passenger and freight contract during the 1950s. In 1950 British Railways launched a summer only service that ran non-stop from Liverpool Street to Beccles where it divided for Lowestoft and Great Yarmouth. The service lasted until 1958. The service was known as The Easterling and the locomotives that worked this service carried a headboard. The Waveney Valley Line closed to passengers on 5 January 1953 although occasional enthusiast trains operated later in the decade.

The Yarmouth-Beccles Line closed to passengers in June 1959. Passengers from Beccles to Yarmouth could still travel via Lowestoft for a direct link via Gorleston to Yarmouth South Town.

After June 1960, the East Suffolk line was only served by diesel trains. The Waveney Valley Line closed to through freight traffic in 1963 but a sand quarry at Ditchingham generated traffic until 1965.

The goods yard closed in early 1968.

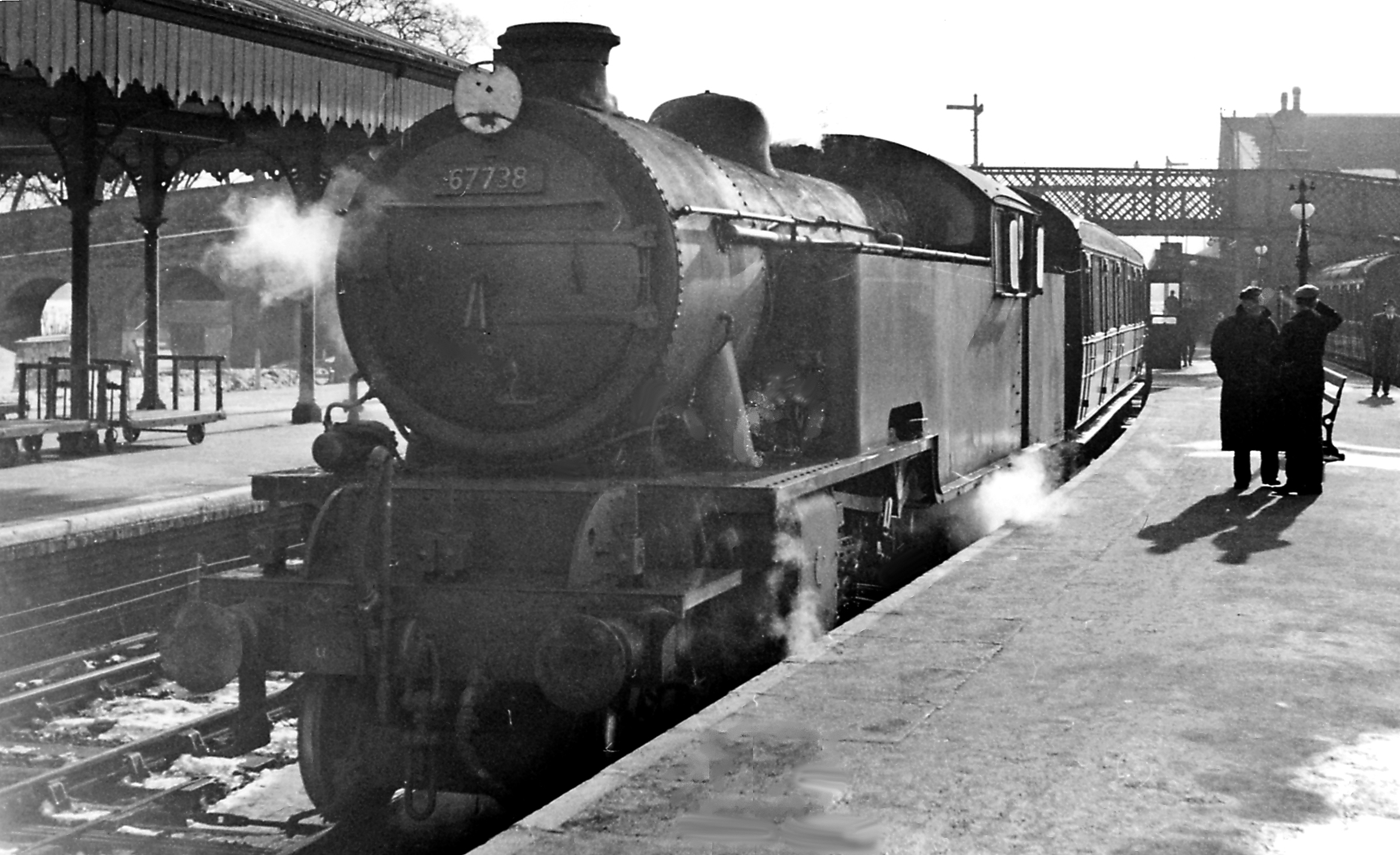
View southward, towards Ipswich

The line through Platform 4 was removed in 1964 and the bay platform the following year.

The Waveney Valley Line was then closed to all traffic on 19 April 1965 when sand traffic from Ditchingham finished.

The entire East Suffolk line was listed for closure as part of the Beeching Plan of 1963. There was considerable local opposition, and on 29 June 1966 the Minister of Transport, Barbara Castle, announced that the East Suffolk main line (Ipswich-Lowestoft) would be retained, although the Aldeburgh branch line closed.

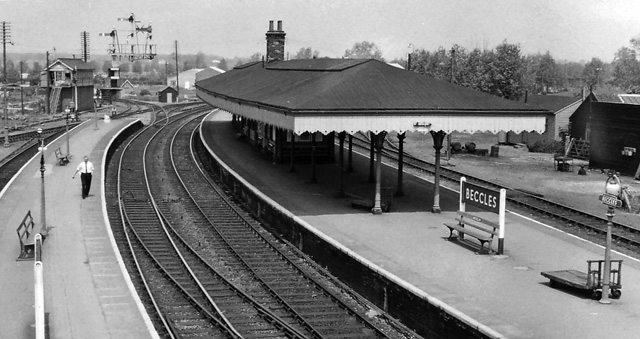
Beccles railway station in 1963

It was essential to reduce the cost of operating the line to the minimum, and this was to be done by partial singling the track, introducing conductor-guard operation (later named the "paytrain" system) and de-staffing the stations. A revised train service was implemented on 11 November 1966, and conductor-guard operation from 10 March 1967.

The through local service Ipswich to Yarmouth via Beccles, Lowestoft and Gorleston ended in November 1966 and the direct link from Lowestoft to Great Yarmouth closed on 4 May 1970.

During the 1970s the station was reduced to a basic two track station although a little used siding was retained on the up side for a number of years. The service was largely worked by two car DMUs such as British Rail Class 104 and British Rail Class 105 during this time. In the late 1970s the line was used for a testbed for an example of the new generation of British Rail railbuses planned for the 1980s.

The East Suffolk line was re-signalled in 1984 using the Radio Electronic Token Block resulting in the closure of Beccles South signal box; the RETB controlling signal box was at Saxmundham. The line through Beccles was now singled with the former Platform 2 being the only platform in use. The island platform survived in a derelict overgrown state and the station footbridge - now surplus to requirements - was demolished at this time. Through trains from Lowestoft to London (generally headed by Class 37 locomotives) were withdrawn and the line was worked by a dedicated fleet of Metropolitan Cammell Class 101 DMUs.

=== The Privatisation Era (1994-2026) ===
From privatisation the track at Beccles station was the responsibility of Railtrack.Following the collapse of this organisation in 2002 responsibility fell to Network Rail.

Between 1994 and 1997 the line was worked by a Train Operating Unit.

The train services have been operated by the following train operating companies:

- Anglia Railways between 5 January 1997 and 4 April 2005.
- National Express East Anglia between 2005 and 2012.
- Abellio Greater Anglia from 2012 with the current franchise, renewed in 2016, and operated until 2025 when the operator passed to the public sector.

The former engine shed was demolished in 2006.

==== Passing loop development ====
Work began in early 2010 to develop a passing loop at Beccles to allow services to operate hourly on the single-track line. The lack of a double-track to allow trains to pass north of Halesworth had previously made this frequency of service impossible.

By March 2010, the single track at Beccles was renewed with continuously welded rail and concrete sleepers. The track was also realigned from the southern approach to the station to allow room for the loop. The old track was lifted and placed alongside the disused platform and disposed of in late 2010. By March 2012, work had started to build the passing loop and, by May of that year, new turnout points were in place and work had begun on redeveloping the disused island platform. The old track bed had also been removed.

Work was completed by December 2012 and enhanced services began on 10 December 2012. The £4 million scheme was jointly funded by Network Rail and Suffolk County Council.

== Description ==
=== Mid 1930s ===
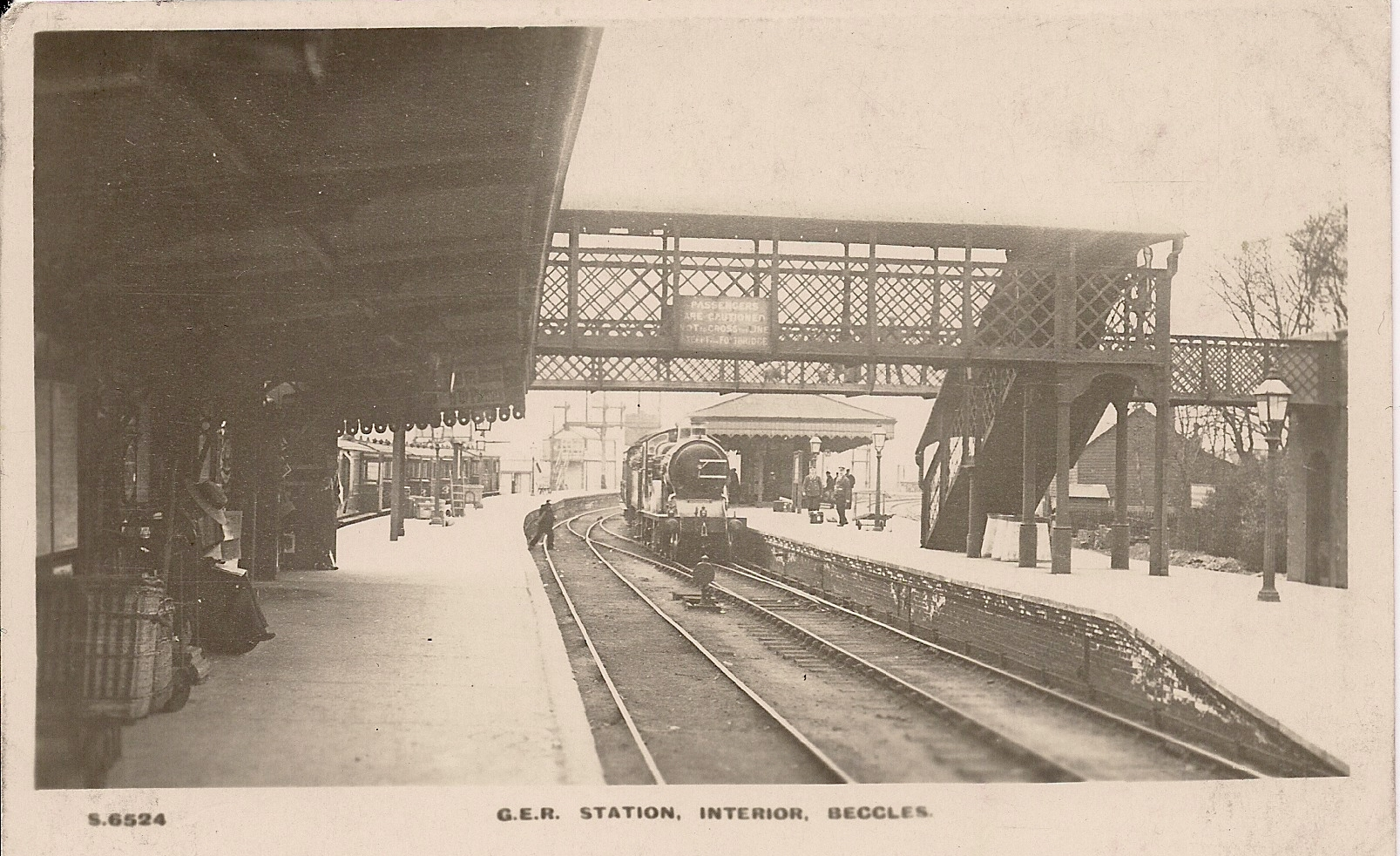
Beccles railway station from a commercial postcard c1900. The train is an up train using Platform 3 whilst on the left is Platform 1 with two coaches possibly from a Waveney Valley service. Beccles North Signal Box can be seen at the end of the platform.jpg

In the 1930s Beccles was an important country junction consisting of four platforms. The main line from Ipswich to Great Yarmouth South Town saw services from London Liverpool Street and there were connecting services to Lowestoft, Tivetshall via the Waveney Valley line and local all stations trains from Ipswich to Yarmouth. The platforms were numbered as follows:

- Platform 1: Bay platform generally used by Waveney Valley services
- Platform 2: Down main platform (services to Great Yarmouth/Lowestoft).
- Platform 3: Up main platform (Services to Ipswich and London)
- Platform 4: Up Loop (services from Lowestoft which would then attach to up London trains) - this and Platform 3 were either side of an island platform. East of this was a goods loop.

A goods shed was located south of the station on the up side and east of this was a large malthouse which could be accessed by wagon turntable. There was also a siding (in the 1905 plan) that ran across the front of the station yard to the north end of the station.

The station building was located on Platform 2 and was an extensive brick building with offices, toilets, waiting rooms etc. The station had a WH Smith newsagent store. The station building had been extended in 1912 and the original arched entrance and porch had been removed as part of that work. The island platform had wooden buildings and a protective awning. The platforms were linked by a lattice style footbridge opened in 1896 which was built with a roof which it later lost.

Just north of this was a foot path bridge (built 1892) that crossed the station but was not part of it. This reduced visibility of signals so some signals in this area had tall posts and a second repeating arm. Cattle pens were located next to Platform 1 reflecting the agricultural nature of the area and adjacent to these was a small gas tank which was used to replenish the gas reservoirs for carriage lighting.

Level access across the tracks was by boarded crossings but in 1933 the LNER provided a swing bridge that allowed platform to platform level access. This may have been a unique structure and when not in use the bridge was recessed and was used as part of Platform 3.

At the north end of the station the Waveney Valley line diverged to the west and down trains would be routed to Lowestoft or Great Yarmouth at this point. The four tracks continued for about a mile before diverging.

=== 2021 ===
The station building was extensively refurbished in the mid 2010s to provide a welcoming gateway to Beccles. This included office space, a café and a replica dark blue British Railways sign.

The entrance to the platforms is just north of the old station building. Access to the up platform is via the original 1892 footbridge which has had a ramp built down to the up (Ipswich) platform.

Basic bus shelter waiting facilities and passenger information screens are to be found on both platforms. The former Platform 1/Cattle dock is filled in and is now a grassed area whilst trees have grown up along the rest of the station area on disused land.

There is a café in the original station building adjoining the Lowestoft-bound platform.

There is a footbridge with quite steep ramps connecting the platforms and passenger information screens on both platforms.

== Operations ==
=== Engine Shed ===
The original engine shed (possibly dating from 1863) was located at the south end of the up platform near Beccles South signal box.

This was replaced in 1888 by a two track brick built shed north of the Waveney Valley line junction. A 50 foot turntable was located in the apex of the junction and there was a coal stage and watering facilities. Locomotives for early morning passenger and local freight services would have been coaled and watered at this location.

During Great Eastern days Beccles was a sub-shed supervised by the Lowestoft foreman and had five crews plus a pair of acting fireman and a couple of cleaners. Generally three locomotives were allocated being enough to take care of local passenger and goods traffic.

On 1 January 1922 only a single locomotive - a GER Class T26 (LNE Class E4) class no 445 - was allocated to Beccles.

The shed closed in 1944 although locomotives were stabled in the area outside for many years after.

The sidings to the engine shed were disconnected in the 1960s and after a period of industrial use, the engine shed was demolished in 2006.

=== Signalling ===
During the time of mechanical semaphore signalling there were five signal boxes in the Beccles area. These were:

- Beccles Bank
- Beccles South
- Beccles North
- Lowestoft Line Junction
- Beccles Swing Bridge

Beccles Bank signal box was opened in 1885 and was there to enable a pilot locomotive to be attached to heavy trains for the southward up run towards Saxmundham as the gradient was 1 in 87. As locomotives became more powerful there was less of a requirement and certainly by the 1950s the box was frequently "switched out". The box was destroyed by a fire in 1958.

Beccles South signal box controlled the south end of the station and this included the swinging barrow bridge. Station staff had to request the signaller unlock the ground frame that released the bridge interlocking before use and the signaller would protect the bridge by setting the relevant signals at danger. Following the rationalisation of the line it was this box that was retained until the introduction of the RETB signalling in 1984.The box was demolished on 12 September 1986.

Beccles North signal box controlled the junction at the north end of the station and the line towards Tivetshall. On 1 May 1966 the box was downgraded to a ground frame controlling a few sidings and the remaining stub of the Waveney Valley Line. The simplification of the layout saw these lifted and final closure of the signal box on 24 May 1969. It was retained for a short period after as a ground frame.

Lowestoft Line Junction signal box up until 1899 controlled the junction to Lowestoft. Initially the line had been two tracks with a single track branch but this was supplemented by a third track. By 1899 a fourth track was added and the junction removed (so all trains were routed at Beccles North) and the box abolished.

Beccles Swing Bridge in the early years when the bridge was single track had two signal boxes. Following doubling of the structure in 1926 a single box was provided which closed on 1 November 1959 when the line to Great Yarmouth was closed.

=== Accidents and incidents ===
- 12 September 1871 - Collision due to shunter error
- 25 July 1878 - A train ran away at Beccles Junction
- 18 February 1890 - level crossing collision - two injuries (Note: There is confusion at source as to whether this incident happened in 1890 or 1891.)
- 14 October 1890 - derailment of passenger train

== Services ==
=== Early years ===
The service on opening in 1854 was three trains each way.

There were four trains each way when the full East Suffolk Line opened through to Ipswich in June 1859. In the down direction, three trains stopped all stations whilst one was limited stop (Ipswich, fast to Saxmundham then Halesworth, Beccles and Yarmouth). In the up direction there were two up express services from Yarmouth with two all stations services forming the first and last trains from Yarmouth.

=== July 1922 ===
In July 1922, the final summer of operation by the Great Eastern Railway, the main line services were Liverpool Street, Ipswich and generally Yarmouth South Town. These trains generally split at Beccles where a portion for Carlton Colville (renamed Oulton Broad South on 26 September 1927) and Lowestoft would be detached and worked to Lowestoft by a different locomotive. In the up direction the portions attached at Beccles. There were a few services for the intermediate stations between Beccles and Yarmouth/Lowestoft and Beccles and Ipswich which were often a separate trains connecting out of a longer distance service. Additionally there were trains on the Waveney Valley Line to Tivetshall via Bungay.

=== 1948 ===
The timetable shows a number of local early morning trains from Beccles to Lowestoft and Yarmouth before the first through train of the day arrived from Liverpool Street. These trains detached the rear coaches for Lowestoft which would have a different engine attached and depart after the Yarmouth portion had departed. In the opposite direction the Lowestoft portion would arrive first and the Yarmouth train second. The locomotive from the Yarmouth train would then detach and shunt the Lowestoft coaches onto the front of the train before departure.

=== March 1964 ===
In March 1964 the East Suffolk Line was facing closure and a vigorous campaign to save the line. Through trains from Lowestoft to Ipswich ran every two hours and short workings between Beccles and Lowestoft and Great Yarmouth at key times of the day. Services from Aldeburgh were extended to Ipswich at the southern end of the line. There were two up trains to Liverpool Street in the morning peak and two evening peak services from Liverpool Street at 17:30 and 18:30.

By 1964 most weekday (Monday to Saturday) trains were operated by DMUs and worked between Ipswich and Lowestoft. The exception was the Liverpool Street (and return) services which were worked by a main line locomotive usually a Class 37 and main line carriages. All services called at Beccles being one of the larger settlements on the route.

=== Services during the privatisation era (1994-2015) ===
During the early years of this period the services were worked by various sprinter DMUs such as the Class 150.These were later replaced by Class 170s.

The TOC introduced one through service to London Liverpool Street in the morning consisting of Class 170 DMUs. There was a return service in the evening.

In December 2010 through trains from Lowestoft to London via the East Suffolk Line were terminated at Ipswich due to the requirement for more passenger capacity between Colchester and Liverpool Street in the peak hours.

From December 2012 an hourly service over the East Suffolk line was introduced following the completion of the passing loop at Beccles.

Abellio Greater Anglia introduced new British Rail Class 755 bi-mode units to the East Suffolk Line in 2019/20.

=== Current ===
As of December 2024, the typical Monday-Sunday off-peak service at Beccles is as follows:

Operator	Route	Rolling stock	Typical frequency
Greater Anglia	Lowestoft - Oulton Broad South - Beccles - Brampton (on request) - Halesworth - Darsham - Saxmundham - Wickham Market - Melton - Woodbridge - Ipswich	Class 755	1x per hour in each direction

One weekday early-morning train is extended through to Harwich International and there is a return from there in the evening.

Preceding station	National Rail	Following station
Brampton	Greater Anglia East Suffolk Line	Oulton Broad South
	Disused railways	
Geldeston Line and station closed	Great Eastern Railway Waveney Valley Line	Terminus
Aldeby Line and station closed	Great Eastern Railway Yarmouth to Beccles Line	Terminus
