= Darsham railway station =

Railway station in Suffolk, England

Coordinates: 52.2730°N 1.5236°E

Darsham
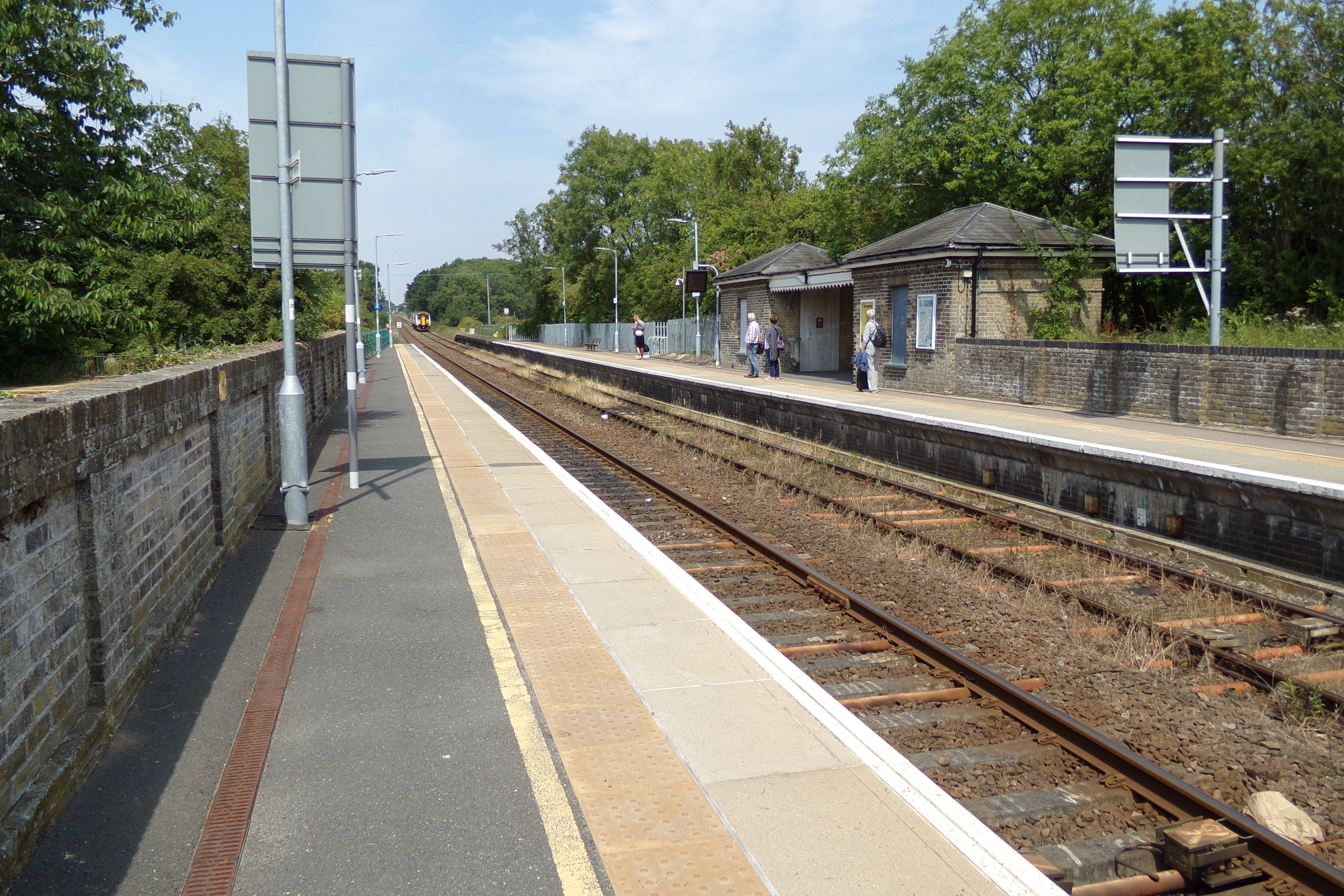

General information
- Location: Darsham, East Suffolk; England
- Grid reference: TM404697
- Managed by: Greater Anglia
- Platforms: 2

Other information
- Station code: DSM
- Classification: DfT category F2

History
- Opened: 1859

Passengers
- 2020/21: ▼13,092
- 2021/22: ▲48,180
- 2022/23: ▲55,964
- 2023/24: ▲60,836
- 2024/25: ▲68,476
Location
Notes
- Passenger statistics from the Office of Rail and Road

Darsham railway station is on the East Suffolk Line in the east of England, serving the villages of Darsham and Yoxford, Suffolk, lying midway between the two communities. It is 26 miles 56 chains (43 km) down the line from Ipswich and 95 miles 35 chains (153.6 km) measured from London Liverpool Street; it is situated between Saxmundham and Halesworth. Its three-letter station code is DSM.

It is managed by Abellio Greater Anglia, which also operates all trains that call.

The station-house is owned by Darsham Country Centre, a subsidiary of the Woodcraft Folk, and is run as a residential centre for youth groups.

== Services ==
As of December 2019 the typical Monday-Sunday off-peak service at Darsham is as follows:

Operator	Route	Rolling stock	Typical frequency
Abellio Greater Anglia	Lowestoft - Oulton Broad South - Beccles - Brampton (on request) - Halesworth - Darsham - Saxmundham - Wickham Market - Melton - Woodbridge - Ipswich	Class 755	1x per hour in each direction

Trains direct to and from London Liverpool Street were withdrawn in 2010.

One weekday early-morning train is extended through to Harwich International and there is a return from there in the evening.

Preceding station	National Rail	Following station
Saxmundham	Greater Anglia East Suffolk Line	Halesworth
