= Melton railway station (Suffolk) =

Railway station in Suffolk, England

Melton
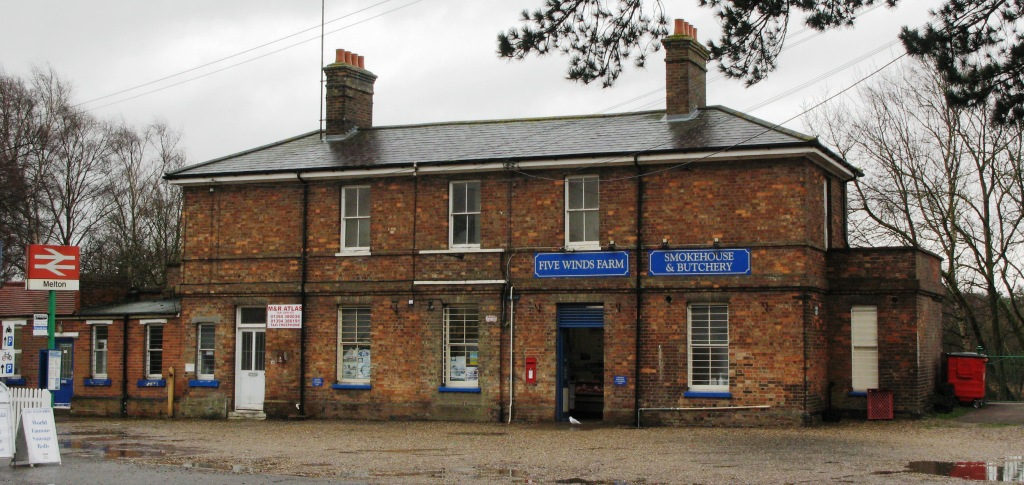
- The station building is occupied by a butcher

General information
- Location: Melton, East Suffolk; England
- Coordinates: 52.104°N 1.338°E
- Grid reference: TM284503
- Manager: Greater Anglia
- Platforms: 1

Other information
- Station code: MES
- Classification: DfT category F2

History
- Original company: East Suffolk Railway
- Pre-grouping: Great Eastern Railway
- Post-grouping: London and North Eastern Railway

Key dates
- 1 June 1859: Opened
- 2 May 1955: Closed to passengers
- 1 June 1972: Closed to freight
- 3 September 1984: Reopened to passengers

Passengers
- 2020/21: ▼14,742
- 2021/22: ▲55,112
- 2022/23: ▲67,954
- 2023/24: ▲77,364
- 2024/25: ▲89,082
Location
Notes
- Passenger statistics from the Office of Rail and Road

Melton railway station is on the East Suffolk Line in the east of England, serving the village of Melton, Suffolk. It is 11 miles 49 chains (18.7 km) down the line from Ipswich and 80 miles 28 chains (129.3 km) measured from London Liverpool Street; it is situated between Woodbridge and Wickham Market. Its three-letter station code is MES.

The station was opened in 1859 but was closed in 1955 and remained so until 1984 when, after a local campaign, it was reopened. Today it is managed by Abellio Greater Anglia, which also operates all trains that call.

It is 1.25 miles from the ancient Anglo-Saxon burial site at Sutton Hoo, run by the National Trust.

== History ==
The railway line connecting the East Suffolk Railway (ESR) at Halesworth to an extension of the Eastern Counties Railway (ECR) at Woodbridge was built by the ESR. The line opened on 1 June 1859, and Melton station opened with the line. The ESR was absorbed by the ECR on opening day.

On 1 July 1862, the ECR and other small railway companies amalgamated to become the Great Eastern Railway (GER). At the 1923 Grouping, the GER was amalgamated with other companies to form the London and North Eastern Railway; this in turn was a constituent of British Railways at the start of 1948.

At the beginning of World War I, the 9th Field Company Royal Engineers were sent to Melton to prepare defences at the station and nearby Wilford Bridge (the first crossing point of the River Deben) against possible invasion.

The station is located outside the village centre and was vulnerable to bus competition which started in 1919.

During World War II Melton was the railhead for nearby RAF Bentwaters with a pipeline running from the station yard. This was supplied by tanker wagons kept in the yard. Remains of crashed aircraft from Orfordness and Sutton crash airfield were sent via Melton during 1943.

The station closed to passengers on 2 May 1955; the goods yard closed on 1 June 1972, although private sidings remained open for domestic coal traffic and roadstone between 1972 and 1976. During this time a small Ruston & Hornsby diesel shunter was based at the sidings. All freight traffic ceased in the early 1980s but after local campaigning the station was reopened for passengers on 3 September 1984.

With the privatisation of British Rail, ownership of the line and station passed to Railtrack on 1 April 1994. The franchise to operate the passenger services on this route was won by Anglia Railways in 1997; in 2004 National Express won the franchise and operated services using the branding 'one', which was renamed National Express East Anglia in 2008.

National Express East Anglia was succeeded as the operator of the Greater Anglia franchise in 2012 by Abellio.

== Services ==
As of December 2020 the typical Monday-Sunday off-peak service at Melton is as follows:

| Operator | Route | Rolling stock | Typical frequency |
|---|---|---|---|
| Abellio Greater Anglia | Lowestoft - Oulton Broad South - Beccles - Brampton (on request) - Halesworth - Darsham - Saxmundham - Wickham Market - Melton - Woodbridge - Ipswich | Class 755 | 1x per hour in each direction |

Trains direct to and from London Liverpool Street were withdrawn in 2010.

One weekday early-morning train is extended through to Harwich International and there is a return from there in the evening.

== Notes ==
| Preceding station | National Rail | Following station |
|---|---|---|
| Wickham Market | Abellio Greater Anglia East Suffolk Line | Woodbridge |
