= Brundall Gardens railway station =

Railway station in Norfolk, England

Coordinates: 52°37′24″N 1°25′06″E

Brundall Gardens
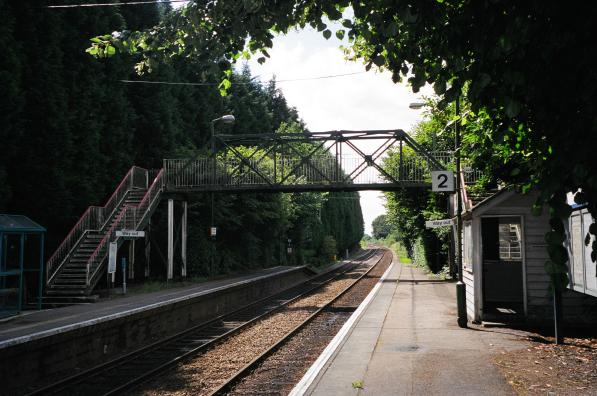
- Looking west

General information
- Location: Brundall, Broadland, Norfolk; England
- Grid reference: TG314083
- Manager: Greater Anglia
- Platforms: 2

Other information
- Station code: BGA
- Classification: DfT category F2

History
- Original company: London and North Eastern Railway
- Post-grouping: London and North Eastern Railway

Key dates
- 1 August 1924: Opened as Brundall Gardens Halt
- 6 May 1968: Renamed Brundall Gardens

Passengers
- 2021/22: ▲11,358
- 2022/23: ▲14,458
- 2023/24: ▲19,246
- 2024/25: ▼17,886
- 2025/26: ▲21,466
Location
Notes
- Passenger statistics from the Office of Rail and Road

Brundall Gardens railway station is a stop on the Wherry Lines in the East of England, serving the western side of the village of Brundall, Norfolk. It is sited 4 miles 66 chains (7.8 km) down the line from Norwich on the routes to Great Yarmouth and Lowestoft. Its three-letter station code is BGA. It is managed and served by Greater Anglia.

== History ==
A station at Brundall Gardens, known initially as Brundall Gardens Halt, was opened on 1 August 1924, 80 years after the opening of the line. This was in response to an increasing level of tourism to the lakes and waterways close to the station.

== Services ==
The typical Monday-Saturday off-peak service at Brundall Gardens is as follows:

Operator	Route	Rolling stock	Typical frequency
Greater Anglia	Norwich - Brundall Gardens - Brundall - Lingwood - Acle - Great Yarmouth	Class 755	1x per hour in each direction

On Mondays to Saturdays, two Norwich to Lowestoft trains also stop at Brundall Gardens during the morning peak. Additionally, the second of the two daily stopping services to Great Yarmouth via Reedham also calls here.

On Sundays, there are eight trains a day in both directions, serving the station every two hours. The last Up train of the day is from Great Yarmouth via Reedham; all other services take the route via Acle.

Preceding station	National Rail	Following station
Norwich	Greater Anglia; Wherry Lines	Brundall
	Historical railways	
Whitlingham; Line open, station closed	Great Eastern Railway; Yarmouth and Norwich Railway	Brundall; Line and station open
