= Somerleyton railway station =

Railway station in Suffolk, England

Coordinates: 52.5102°N 1.6522°E

Somerleyton
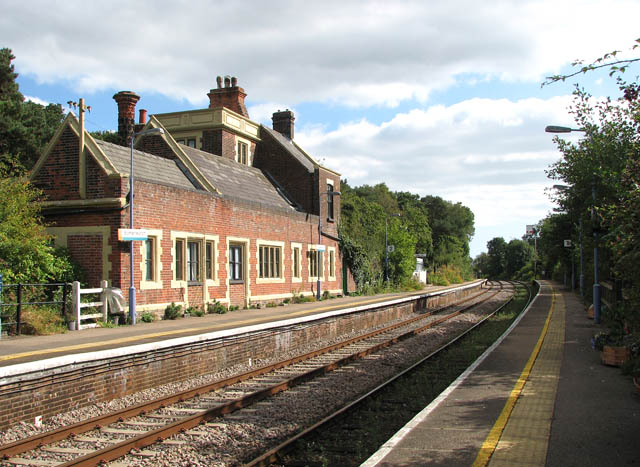

General information
- Location: Somerleyton, East Suffolk; England
- Grid reference: TM479965
- Manager: Greater Anglia
- Platforms: 2

Other information
- Station code: SYT
- Classification: DfT category F2

History
- Original company: Norfolk Railway
- Pre-grouping: Great Eastern Railway
- Post-grouping: London and North Eastern Railway

Key dates
- 1 July 1847: Opened

Passengers
- 2021/22: ▲8,696
- 2022/23: ▲9,010
- 2023/24: ▲10,076
- 2024/25: ▲11,958
- 2025/26: ▲15,220
Location
Notes
- Passenger statistics from the Office of Rail and Road

Somerleyton railway station is on the Wherry Lines in the east of England, serving the village of Somerleyton, Suffolk. It is 18 miles (29 km) down the line from Norwich on the route to Lowestoft, and is less than 2 miles (3.2 km) from Somerleyton Hall on foot. Its three-letter station code is SYT.

The station is managed by Greater Anglia, which also operates all of the trains that call.

In The Rings of Saturn, the author W. G. Sebald describes travelling by train from Norwich and crossing the line to walk to Somerleyton Hall.

== Services ==
As of December 2016 the typical Monday-Saturday off-peak service at Somerleyton is as follows:

Operator	Route	Rolling stock	Typical frequency
Greater Anglia	Lowestoft - Oulton Broad North - Somerleyton - Haddiscoe - Reedham - Cantley - Brundall - Norwich	Class 755.	1x every 2 hours in each direction

Preceding station	National Rail	Following station
Haddiscoe	Greater Anglia; Wherry Lines; Lowestoft branch	Oulton Broad North
	Historical railways	
Haddiscoe (Norfolk Railway); Line open, station closed	Great Eastern Railway; Norfolk Railway	Oulton Broad North; Line and station open
