= Brundall railway station =

Railway station in Norfolk, England

Coordinates: 52°37′10″N 1°26′22″E

Brundall
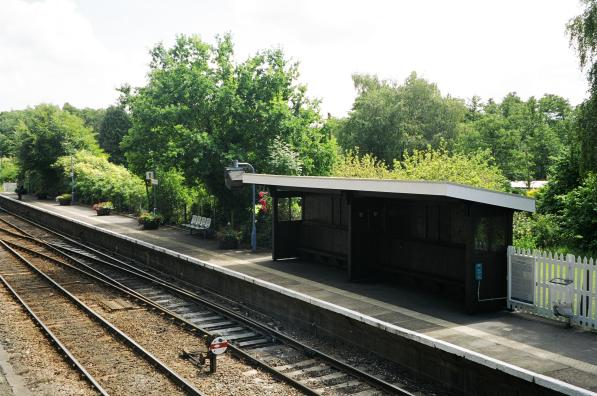
- Platform 1 (westbound) for services to Brundall Gardens and Norwich

General information
- Location: Brundall, Broadland; England
- Grid reference: TG328079
- Managed by: Greater Anglia
- Platforms: 2

Other information
- Station code: BDA
- Classification: DfT category F2

History
- Original company: Yarmouth and Norwich Railway
- Pre-grouping: Great Eastern Railway
- Post-grouping: LNER

Key dates
- 1 May 1844: Opened

Passengers
- 2020/21: ▼33,282
- 2021/22: ▲83,006
- 2022/23: ▲92,068
- 2023/24: ▲100,552
- 2024/25: ▲103,312
Location
Notes
- Passenger statistics from the Office of Rail and Road

Brundall railway station is on the Wherry Lines in the east of England, serving the village of Brundall, Norfolk. It is 5 miles 60 chains (9.3 km) down the line from Norwich on the route to Great Yarmouth and Lowestoft. Its three-letter station code is BDA.

The station was opened in 1844. Today it is managed by Greater Anglia.

== History ==
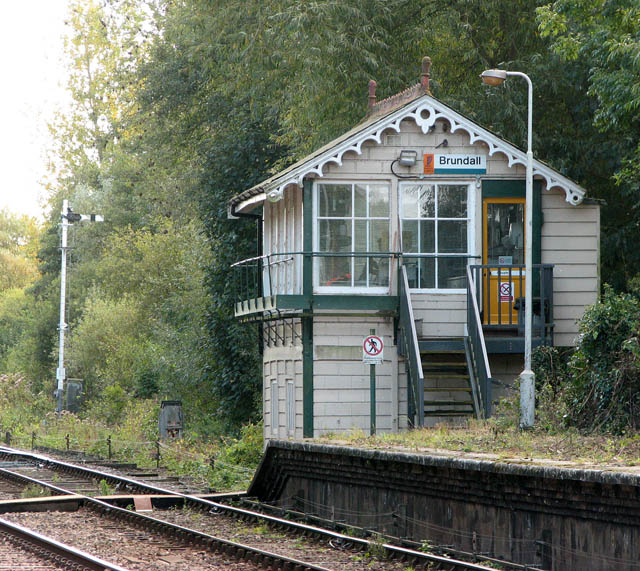
Brundall railway station signal box

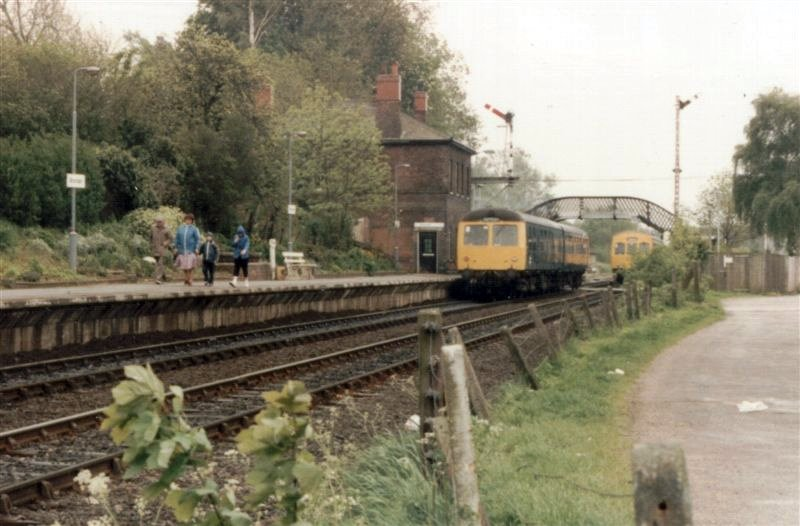
Brundall railway station in 1984

The bill for the Yarmouth and Norwich Railway (Y&NR) received royal assent on 18 June 1842 as the Yarmouth and Norwich Railway Act 1842 (5 & 6 Vict. c. lxxxii). Work started on the line in April 1843 and the line and its stations were opened on 1 May 1844. Brundall station opened with the line and was situated east of Norwich Thorpe and west of Buckenham. The Y&NR was the first public railway line in Norfolk.

On 30 June 1845 the Norfolk Railway Act 1845 (8 & 9 Vict. c. xli) authorising the amalgamation of the Y&NR with the Norwich and Brandon Railway came into effect and Brundall station became a Norfolk Railway asset.

On 15 December 1845 a swing bridge over the River Wensum opened and this allowed freight trains going to and from Yarmouth via Brundall to bypass Norwich. The Eastern Counties Railway (ECR) and its rival the Eastern Union Railway (EUR) were both sizing up the Norfolk Railway to acquire and expand their railway empire. The ECR trumped the EUR by taking over the Norfolk Railway, including Brundall station, on 8 May 1848.

By the 1860s the railways in East Anglia were in financial trouble, and most were leased to the Eastern Counties Railway, which wished to amalgamate formally but could not obtain government agreement for this with the passing of the Great Eastern Railway Act 1862 (25 & 26 Vict. c. ccxxiii) on 7 August 1862, when the Great Eastern Railway (GER) was formed by the amalgamation. Brundall became a GER station on 1 July 1862 when the GER took over the ECR and the EUR before the bill received royal assent.

In the 1870s the GER started to expand its network east of Norwich. The GER obtained powers to build a line to Cromer leaving the Yarmouth to Norwich line at Whitlingham. The opening of Whitlingham station and the new line on 20 October 1874 meant that Brundall was now separated from Norwich Thorpe by the new station.

The next development occurred in the 1880s. The GER obtained powers to build a new line from Great Yarmouth to Brundall via Acle. The new line joined the old Yarmouth & Norwich route at Brundall which was now a junction station. Brundall achieved its junction status on 1 June 1883.

With the passing of the Railways Act 1921, the GER amalgamated with other railways to form the London and North Eastern Railway (LNER) on 1 January 1923, and so Brundall became a LNER station. A new station, Brundall Gardens Halt, was opened to the west of Brundall on 1 August 1924.

On nationalisation on 1 January 1948 the station and its operations came under the management of the Eastern Region of British Railways.

Following privatisation of the railways, Railtrack became responsible for infrastructure maintenance in 1994. Following Railtrack's financial problems Network Rail took over operation of the infrastructure in 2002.

At the same time, the station's services were transferred to Anglia Railways in 1997, which was succeeded by National Express East Anglia in 2004, then known as One. In February 2012 the station and its operations were transferred to Abellio Greater Anglia.

== Services ==
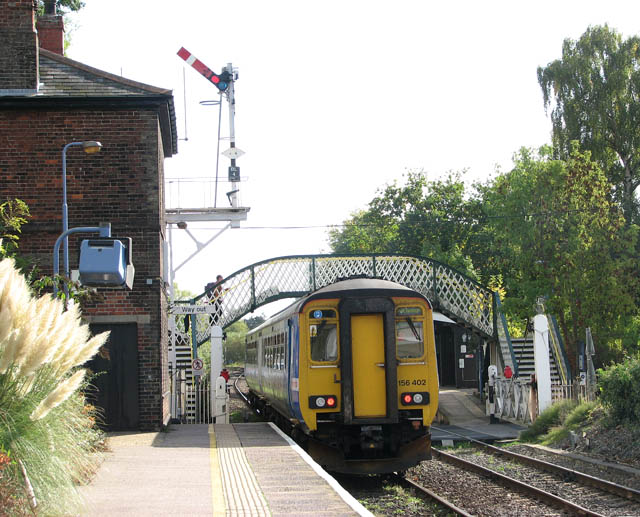
A Class 156 diesel multiple unit leaving Brundall station

The typical Monday-Saturday off-peak service at Brundall is as follows:

Operator	Route	Rolling stock	Typical frequency
Greater Anglia	Lowestoft - Oulton Broad North - Somerleyton - Haddiscoe - Reedham - Cantley - Brundall - Norwich	Class 755	1x every 2 hours in each direction
Greater Anglia	Great Yarmouth - Acle - Lingwood - Brundall - Brundall Gardens - Norwich	Class 755	1x per hour in each direction
Greater Anglia	Great Yarmouth - Berney Arms (on request) - Reedham - Cantley - Brundall - Norwich	Class 755	2x per day in each direction

Preceding station	National Rail	Following station
Brundall Gardens	Greater Anglia; Wherry Lines (via Acle)	Lingwood
Brundall Gardens	Greater Anglia; Wherry Lines (via Reedham)	Buckenham
