= Oulton Broad North railway station =

Railway station in Suffolk, England

Coordinates: 52.4777°N 1.7157°E

Oulton Broad North
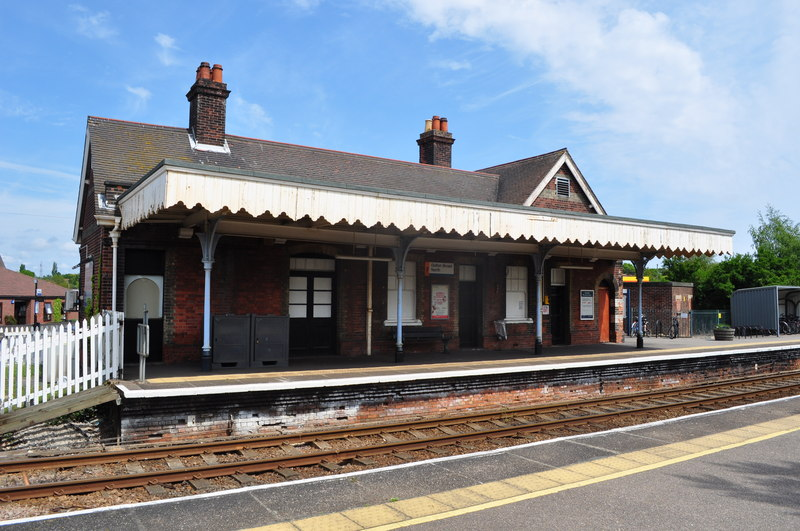
- Oulton Broad North railway station

General information
- Location: Oulton Broad, East Suffolk; England
- Grid reference: TM524931
- Managed by: Greater Anglia
- Platforms: 2

Other information
- Station code: OUN
- Classification: DfT category F2

History
- Original company: Norfolk Railway
- Pre-grouping: Great Eastern Railway
- Post-grouping: London and North Eastern Railway

Key dates
- 1 July 1847: Opened as Mutford
- 1 July 1881: Renamed Oulton Broad (Mutford)
- November 1915: Renamed Oulton Broad
- 26 September 1927: Renamed Oulton Broad North

Passengers
- 2020/21: ▼21,768
- 2021/22: ▲98,344
- 2022/23: ▲0.109 million
- 2023/24: ▲0.125 million
- 2024/25: ▲0.137 million
Location
Notes
- Passenger statistics from the Office of Rail and Road

Oulton Broad North railway station (originally opened as Mutford and later known as Oulton Broad (Mutford) and Oulton Broad) is on the Wherry Lines in the east of England, and is one of two stations serving Oulton Broad, Suffolk. The other is Oulton Broad South on the East Suffolk Line. Oulton Broad North is 22 miles 4 chains (35.5 km) down the line from Norwich on the route to Lowestoft. The East Suffolk Line runs between Lowestoft and Ipswich.

== History ==
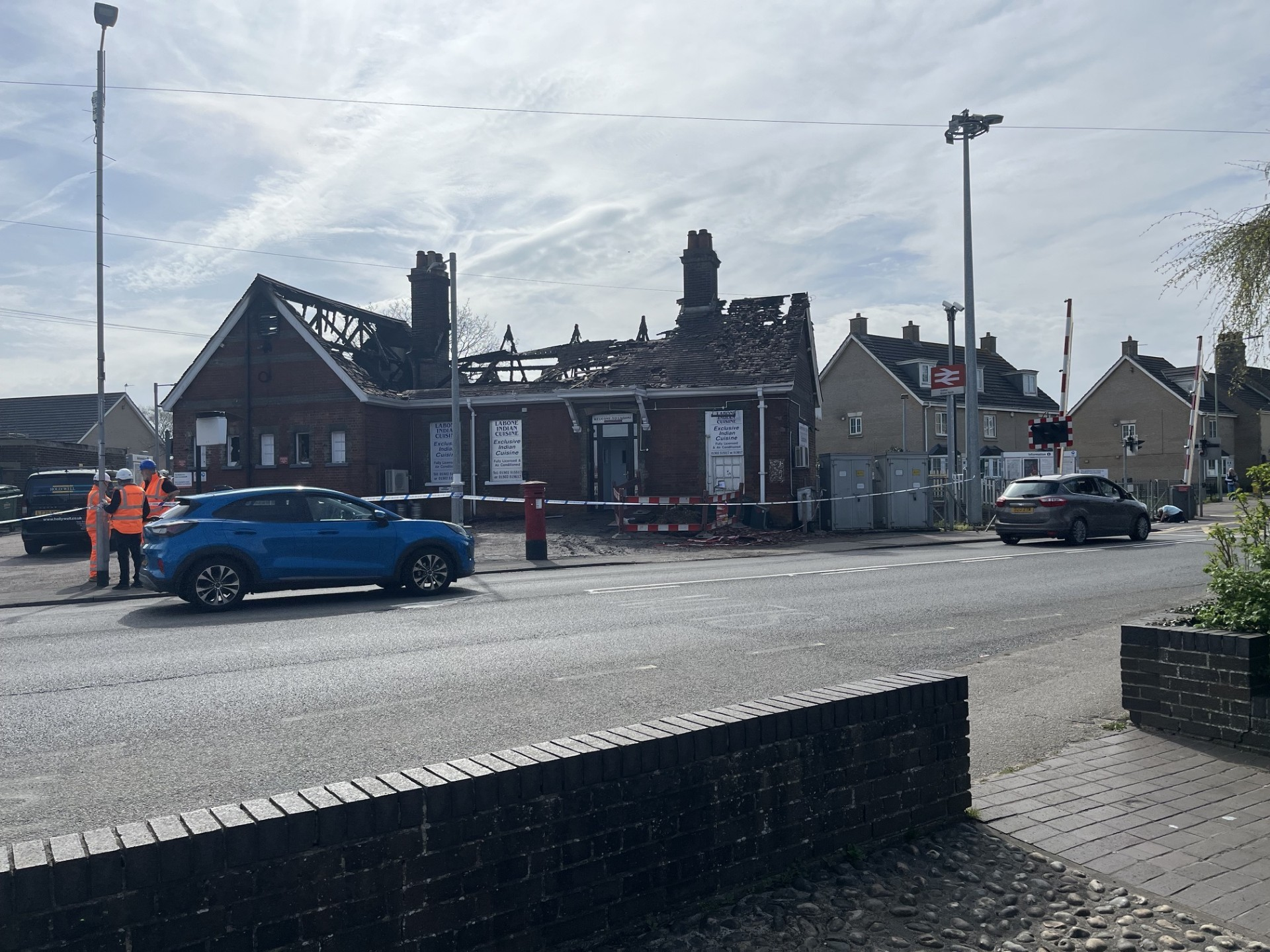
Oulton Broad North Station Building after the fire on 8 April 2026

The station building dates from the station's opening in 1847. Today, the station is managed by Greater Anglia, which also operates all trains that call but is unstaffed.

The tracks from Lowestoft split into two separate lines to Norwich and Ipswich just before Oulton Broad North. Trains to Ipswich pass Oulton Broad North closely, but there has never been a platform for them to call there. The Ipswich trains call at Oulton Broad South, which is about three-quarters of a mile by road to the south.

Late on the night of 8th April, 2026, a fire took place in the station building that was occupied by the Labone Indian Restaurant. The station was unable to be served or passed through by trains and services between Lowestoft, Norwich and Ipswich were heavily disrupted the following day.

== Services ==
As of December 2018, the typical Monday-Saturday off-peak service at Oulton Broad North is as follows:

Operator	Route	Rolling stock	Typical frequency	Note
Greater Anglia	Lowestoft - Oulton Broad North - Somerleyton - Haddiscoe - Reedham - Cantley - Buckenham (request stop) - Brundall - Norwich	Class 755	1x per hour in each direction	Reduced stops for every other train

Preceding station	National Rail	Following station
Somerleyton	Greater Anglia; Wherry Lines; Lowestoft branch	Lowestoft
