= Brundall signal box =

Signal box in Brundall, Norfolk, England

Coordinates: 52°37′7.25″N 1°26′23.70″E

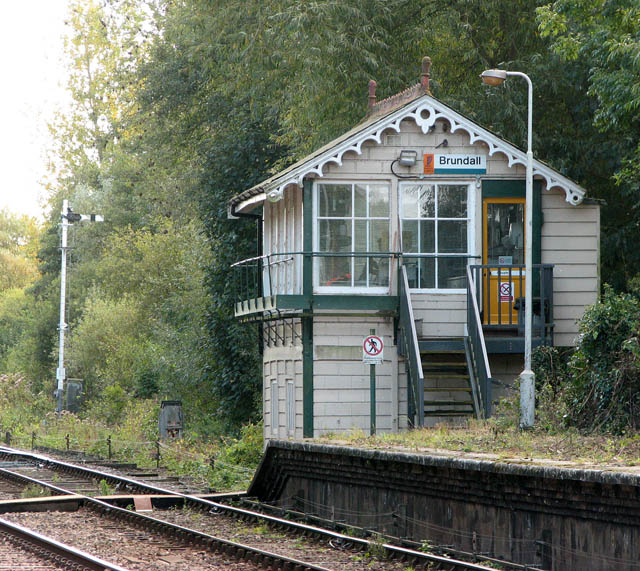
Brundall signal box, October 2009

Brundall signal box is a Grade II listed former Great Eastern Railway signal box on Brundall railway station in Norfolk, England.

Located on the Wherry Lines linking Norwich with Lowestoft, it remains a junction point with the line to Great Yarmouth via Acle diverging via Reedham just to the east of the station. Served by Greater Anglia, the station is unstaffed.

In July 2013, it was one of 26 "highly distinctive" signal boxes listed by Ed Davey, Minister for the Department for Culture, Media and Sport, in a joint initiative by English Heritage and Network Rail to preserve and provide a window into how railways were operated in the past. Signalling control at the site was transferred to Colchester in February 2020, making the structure obsolete. The signal box is scheduled to be preserved on the Mid-Norfolk Railway.
