= Haddiscoe railway station =

Railway station in Norfolk, England

Coordinates: 52.52887°N 1.62239°E

Haddiscoe
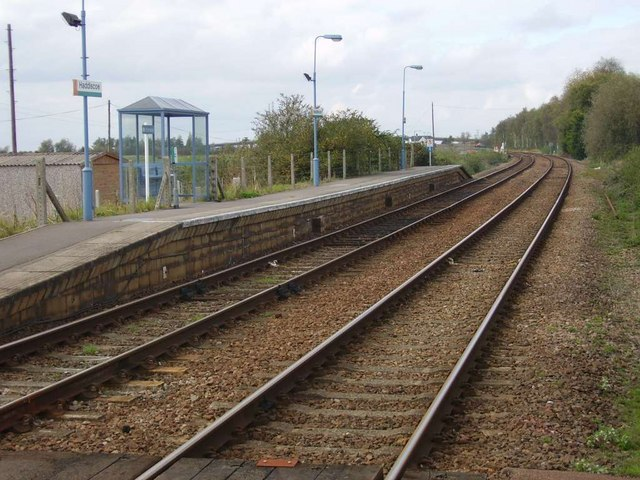

General information
- Location: St Olaves, South Norfolk; England
- Grid reference: TM458985
- Manager: Greater Anglia
- Platforms: 2

Other information
- Station code: HAD
- Classification: DfT category F2

History
- Original company: Great Eastern Railway
- Pre-grouping: Great Eastern Railway
- Post-grouping: London and North Eastern Railway

Key dates
- 9 May 1904: Opened as Haddiscoe Low Level
- After 2 November 1959: Renamed Haddiscoe

Passengers
- 2021/22: ▲9,086
- 2022/23: ▲10,304
- 2023/24: ▲12,064
- 2024/25: ▲14,758
- 2025/26: ▲15,604
Location
Notes
- Passenger statistics from the Office of Rail and Road

Haddiscoe railway station (formerly Haddiscoe Low Level) is a stop on the Wherry Lines in Norfolk, England. It named after the village of Haddiscoe, some 2 miles (3.2 km) away; however, the village of St Olaves, sited on the other side of the River Waveney, is closer. The station is 16 miles 11 chains (26 km) down the line from Norwich, on the route to Lowestoft; it is situated between Reedham and Somerleyton. Its three-letter station code is HAD.

Haddiscoe station is managed by Greater Anglia, which also operates all trains serving the station.

== History ==
An earlier Haddiscoe station was opened by the Norfolk Railway in 1847 but was later closed by the Great Eastern Railway in 1904. It was replaced by this station, originally named Haddiscoe Low Level, at the junction of the Wherry Line and the now closed Yarmouth-Beccles Line from London to Yarmouth.

An existing station on the Yarmouth-Beccles Line at this junction was renamed from Herringfleet Junction to Haddiscoe High Level at the same time.

Both the High Level station and the Low Level station operated until the British Transport Commission withdrew services on the Yarmouth line in 1959 and closed the associated High Level station. British Railways subsequently renamed the remaining station Haddiscoe.

A link between the two lines existed, controlled by Haddiscoe Junction signal box. In 1961, the signal box was preserved in the transport gallery at the Science Museum, Kensington, where it was adapted to display various kinds of signalling equipment. In 1995 it was moved to the Mangapps Railway Museum.

== Services ==
The typical off-peak service at Haddiscoe is as follows:

Operator	Route	Rolling stock	Typical frequency
Greater Anglia	Lowestoft - Oulton Broad North - Somerleyton - Haddiscoe - Reedham - Cantley - Brundall - Norwich	Class 755	1x every 2 hours in each direction

Preceding station	National Rail	Following station
Reedham	Greater Anglia; Wherry Lines; Lowestoft branch	Somerleyton
