= Thorpe rail accident =

1874 train crash in Norfolk, England

Coordinates: 52.62436°N 1.34208°E

Details
- Date: 10 September 1874; 21:45
- Location: Thorpe St Andrew, Norfolk
- Country: England
- Line: Norfolk Railway
- Cause: Single-line telegraphic working error

Statistics
- Trains: 2
- Deaths: 25
- Injured: 75

The Thorpe rail accident occurred on 10 September 1874 when two trains were involved in a head-on collision near Thorpe St Andrew, Norfolk, England.

The accident occurred on what was then a single-track rail line between Norwich Thorpe and Brundall. The two trains involved were the 20:40 mail from Yarmouth Vauxhall and the 17:00 express from London to Yarmouth. The latter had left Norwich Thorpe at 21:30 and would normally have had a clear run on its way to Yarmouth, since the mail train should have been held on a loop line at Brundall to allow the express to pass. On this occasion trains were running late.

In such circumstances, when the timetable could not be kept, drivers had to have written authority to proceed further. Due to a series of errors (primarily, the telegraph clerk sending the authorisation message before it had been signed by the appropriate official), both drivers received their authority, and anxious to make up for lost time, set off at speed along the single track. The accident, when it occurred around 21:45, resulted in both locomotives rearing into the air, and carriages reduced to wreckage.

Both drivers and firemen were killed, as were seventeen passengers, with four later dying from their injuries. Seventy-three passengers and two railway guards were seriously injured.

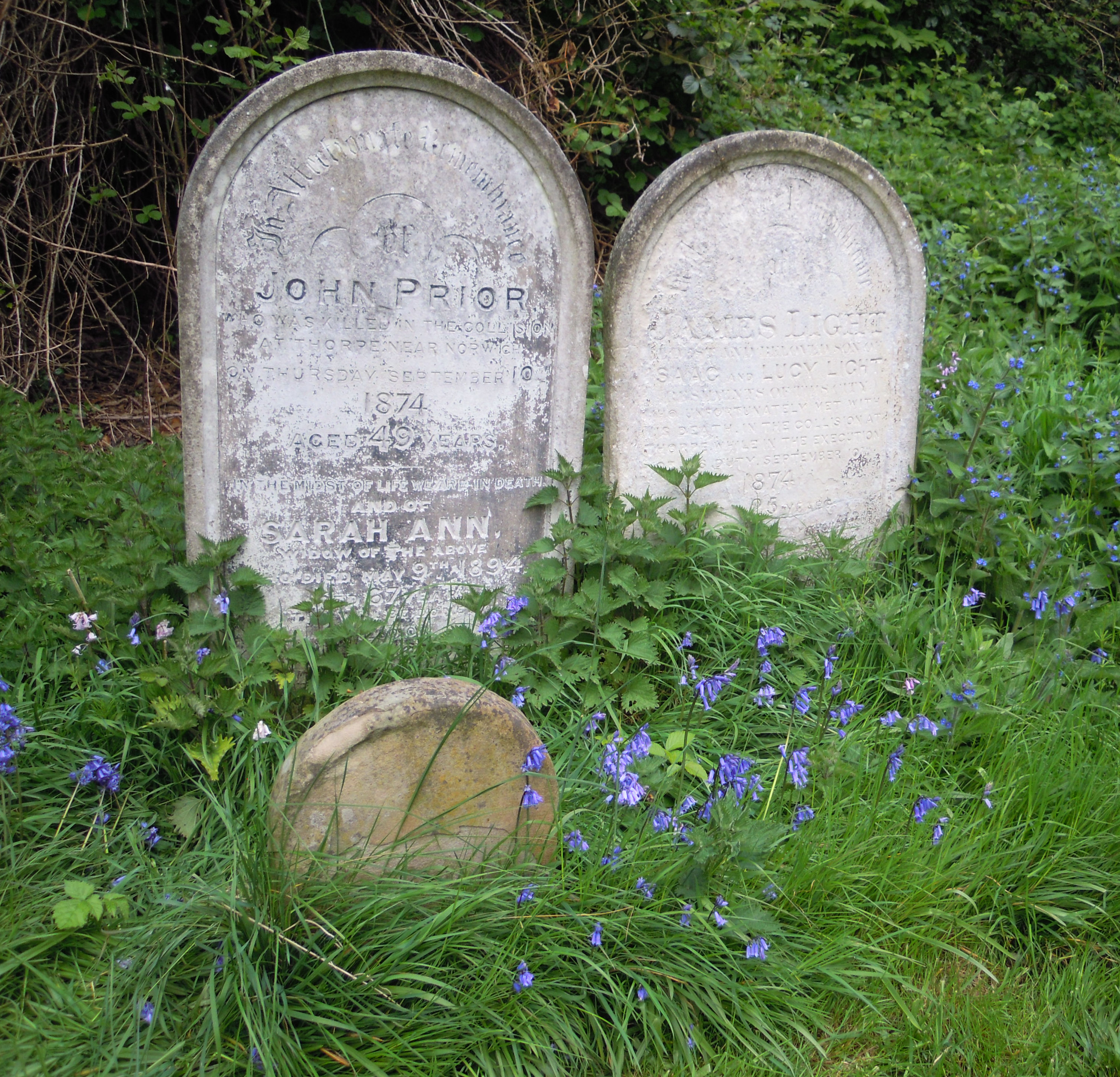
Graves of mail train driver John Prior and fireman James Light in Rosary Cemetery, Norwich

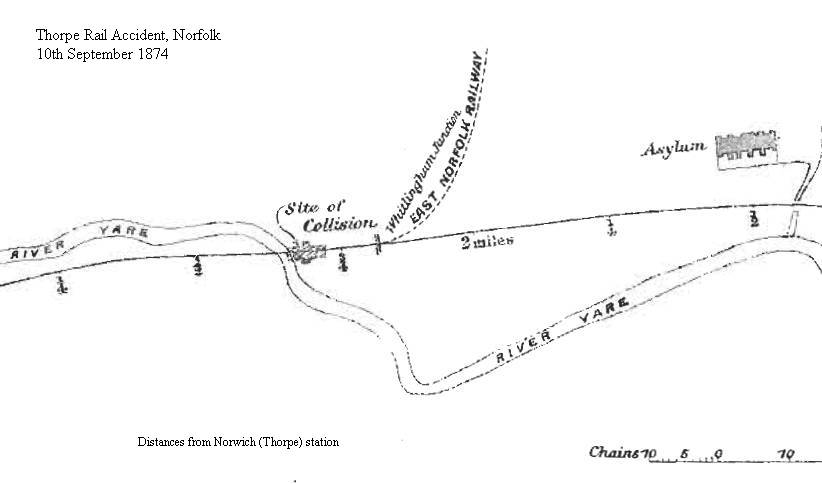
Sketch map from 1874 Board of Trade report (detail)

Prompted by the accident, engineer Edward Tyer developed the tablet system in which a token is given to the train driver; this must be slotted into an electric interlocking device at the other end of the single-track section before another train is allowed to pass.

== Similar accidents ==
The Canoe River train crash in Canada in 1950 also involved two trains, controlled by telegraphed orders, authorized to enter the same single-track section in opposite directions.
