= Lingwood railway station =

Railway station in Norfolk, England

Coordinates: 52°37′19″N 1°29′21″E

Lingwood
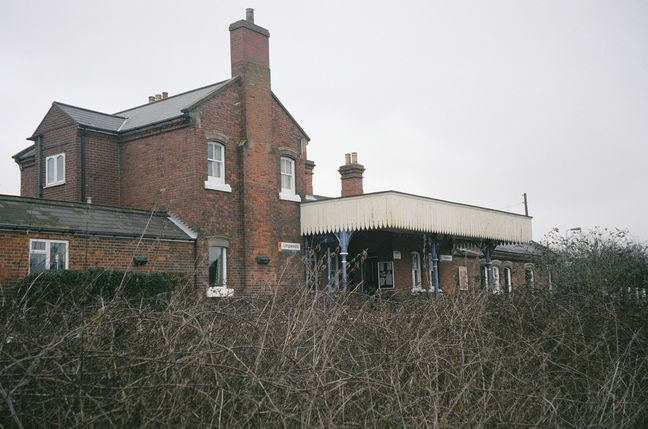
- Lingwood station from the other side of the line

General information
- Location: Lingwood, Broadland; England
- Grid reference: TG363084
- Manager: Greater Anglia
- Platforms: 1

Other information
- Station code: LGD
- Classification: DfT category F2

History
- Opened: 1882
- Original company: Great Eastern Railway
- Pre-grouping: Great Eastern Railway
- Post-grouping: London and North Eastern Railway

Passengers
- 2021/22: ▲37,524
- 2022/23: ▲44,230
- 2023/24: ▲45,572
- 2024/25: ▲49,708
- 2025/26: ▲53,642
Location
Notes
- Passenger statistics from the Office of Rail and Road

Lingwood railway station is on the Wherry Lines in the east of England, serving the village of Lingwood, Norfolk. It is 7 miles 78 chains (12.8 km) down the line from Norwich on the route to Great Yarmouth and is situated between Brundall and Acle. Its three-letter station code is LGD.

It is managed by Greater Anglia, which operates all trains serving the station.

The station dates back to 1882, when it was built by the Great Eastern Railway to serve the village of Lingwood. At this time agriculture was thriving in the village and surrounding areas, so much so that over £1,000 was spent on a large warehouse next to the station. This was served by sidings, a second platform and a goods yard. Much of this still exists to this day, although it is not publicly accessible.

The station building fell out of use in 1965 during the Beeching cuts. After this it was used as a dress shop, and then a doctor's surgery, before being left derelict for several years in the early 1980s. It was then bought from British Rail in 1989 by the current owners, and was completely renovated. Many of the original features were retained, and it was opened as a Bed & Breakfast in 1990, which it remains.

== Services ==
As of January 2021 the typical Monday-Saturday off-peak service at Lingwood is as follows:

Operator	Route	Rolling stock	Typical frequency
Greater Anglia	Norwich - Brundall Gardens - Brundall - Lingwood - Acle - Great Yarmouth	Class 755	1x per hour in each direction

Preceding station	National Rail	Following station
Brundall	Greater Anglia; Wherry Lines	Acle
