= Haddiscoe railway station (Norfolk Railway) =

Former railway station in England

Coordinates: 52.5344°N 1.6163°E

Haddiscoe
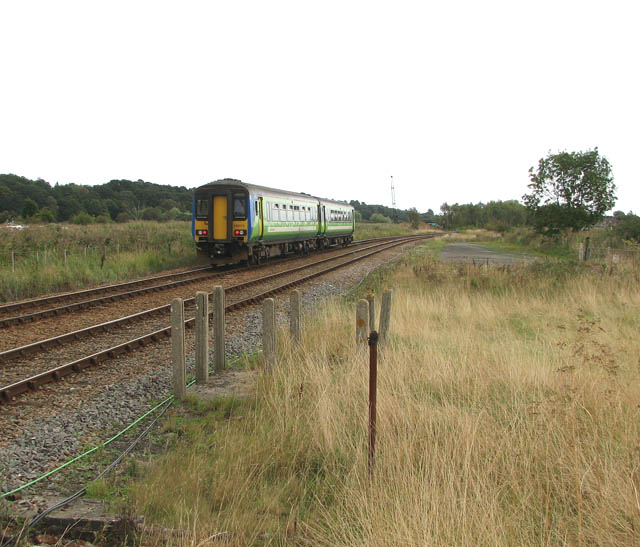
- A Class 156 passing through the site of the station in 2009

General information
- Location: Haddiscoe, South Norfolk, Norfolk; England
- Grid reference: TM454991

Other information
- Status: Disused

History
- Original company: Norfolk Railway
- Pre-grouping: Great Eastern Railway

Key dates
- 1 July 1847: Opened
- 9 May 1904: Closed
Location

This was the original Haddiscoe railway station serving Haddiscoe, Norfolk. It was opened in 1847 by the Norfolk Railway and closed in 1904. Upon closure it was replaced by Haddiscoe Low Level railway station which was later renamed Haddiscoe railway station and remains open.

There was also a station nearby on a higher level known as Herringfleet Junction which later became Haddiscoe High Level and closed in 1959.

Former Services

Preceding station	Historical railways	Following station
Reedham; Line and station open	Great Eastern Railway; Norfolk Railway	Somerleyton; Line and station open
