= Acle railway station =

Railway station in Norfolk, England

Acle
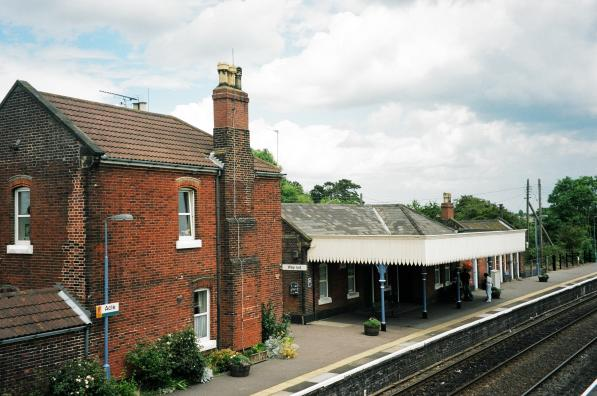
- The station viewed from the footbridge

General information
- Location: Acle, Broadland, England
- Coordinates: 52°38′04″N 1°32′37″E
- Grid reference: TG398100
- Manager: Greater Anglia
- Platforms: 2

Other information
- Station code: ACL
- Classification: DfT category F2

History
- Original company: Great Eastern Railway
- Pre-grouping: Great Eastern Railway
- Post-grouping: London and North Eastern Railway

Key dates
- 12 March 1883: Opened

Passengers
- 2021/22: ▲33,642
- 2022/23: ▲40,672
- 2023/24: ▲41,334
- 2024/25: ▲47,882
- 2025/26: ▲56,420
Location
Notes
- Passenger statistics from the Office of Rail and Road

Acle railway station is a stop on the Wherry Lines in the east of England, serving the town of Acle, in Norfolk. It lies 10 miles 34 chains (16.8 km) down the line from Norwich on the route to Great Yarmouth.

== History ==
Opened by the Great Eastern Railway in 1883, it became part of the London and North Eastern Railway following the Grouping of 1923. The line then passed on to the Eastern Region of British Railways upon nationalisation in 1948.

When sectorisation was introduced, the station was served by Regional Railways until the privatisation of British Rail.

Until 2019, trains were formed by diesel multiple units of Classes 153, 156 or 170. During the summer months, some locomotive-hauled trains, top-and-tailed with a Class 37 at either end, would work some services on the Wherry Lines.

Today, the station is managed by Greater Anglia, which operates all passenger services between Norwich and Great Yarmouth with Class 755 Stadler FLIRT electro-diesel multiple units.

The station has the only passing loop on the Acle branch of the line. A coaling depot was once located here.

== Services ==
The typical off-peak service at Acle is as follows:

Operator	Route	Rolling stock	Frequency
Greater Anglia	Norwich - Brundall Gardens - Brundall - Lingwood - Acle - Great Yarmouth	Class 755	1x per hour each way

Preceding station	National Rail	Following station
Lingwood or Norwich	Greater Anglia; Wherry Lines	Great Yarmouth
