= Whitlingham =

Hamlet in Norfolk, England

Coordinates: 52.618947°N 1.357703°E

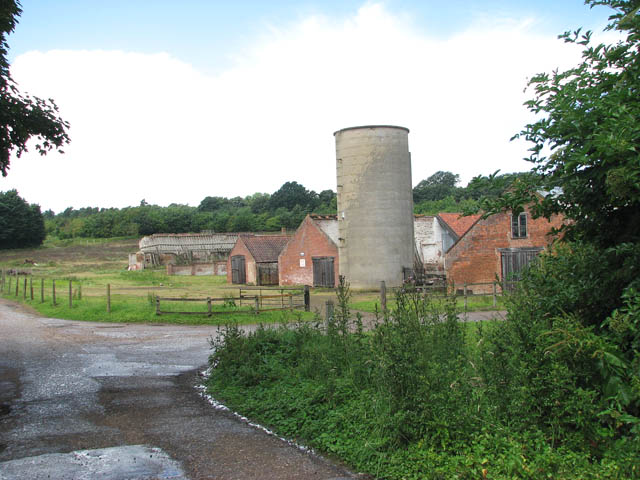
- Barns by Whitlingham Hall

- Location within Norfolk
- Civil parish: Kirby Bedon
- District: South Norfolk
- Shire county: Norfolk
- Region: East
- Country: England
- Sovereign state: United Kingdom
- Post town: NORWICH
- Postcode district: NR14
- Dialling code: 01603
- UK Parliament: South Norfolk

Whitlingham is a small hamlet and former civil parish at the mouth of the River Wensum, now in the parish of Kirby Bedon, in the South Norfolk district of Norfolk, England. It is located 3 miles (5 km) east of Norwich, on the south bank of the River Yare, reached from Trowse along Whitlingham Lane. In 1931 the parish had a population of 99. On 1 April 1935 the parish was abolished and merged with Kirby Bedon.

== Church ==
The round-towered church of St. Andrew was dilapidated about 1630, and for centuries was a picturesque ruin on the verge of a lofty precipice, overlooking the river. There is photographic evidence to suggest the ruins were prettified during the second half of the 19th century, with eroded parapets rebuilt, and new window tracery inserted. The round tower collapsed in 1940 and today the fragmentary ruins are very overgrown.

== Broads and country park ==
View down the Great Broad to the outdoor education centre

The Great Broad at Whitlingham Park has been created through the process of gravel extraction. The extraction work at Whitlingham began in 1990 with the creation of the Little Broad. In 1995, work began on the Great Broad, with the quarry removing around 220,000 tonnes of material a year.

The quarry is owned and was run by Lafarge Aggregates. The Whitlingham Quarry is now closed and has been turned into a car park and campsite for the country park users.

Gravel from Whitlingham was used on construction projects in the city such as the Castle Mall, The Forum, and the redevelopment of the old Nestlé site into the Chapelfield shopping centre.

An activity centre was built on the south bank of the Great Broad; construction was funded by the National Lottery and Sport England and the centre is run by Norfolk County Council. Norfolk County Council leases the Great Broad from the Crown Point Estate which is represented by the Whitlingham Charitable Trust.

The Little Broad had a beach. Following a fatal accident in late 2008, swimming has been discouraged. There was a further double drowning in 2015 on the third broad on the Thorpe side of the river. The Broads Authority is planning to bring in byelaws to make swimming illegal, except in organised groups run through the Whitlingham Adventure Centre. Such events include the annual Norwich Triathlon in July.

Both the Wherryman's Way long-distance footpath and National Cycle Route 1 pass through the park.

The park was visited by Prime Minister Gordon Brown in July 2008, at the start of his East Anglian holiday.

== Woods ==
Situated at the lower end of the country park, this area has a history of mining, including flint-knapping from 4000 BC, up to the 18th century. Archaeologists have found a number of artefacts in this area, including humanly struck flint flakes and part of a chipped flint axe-head from the Neolithic period, along with an iron-stained flint blade dating back to the Paleolithic period (500,000 BC to 10,001 BC). From the 18th century until the early 20th century the area produced chalk and lime, the deep chalk pits are still present though overgrown and a Lime kiln is reached by a signed footpath from Whitlingham Lane. Since then this area has been developing from open landscape to the woodland of today.

== Transport ==
The village was served by Whitlingham railway station, situated on the north side of the River Yare, between 1874 and 1964. The nearest railway station is now Norwich.
