= Crown Point TMD =

Train maintenance depot in Norwich, England

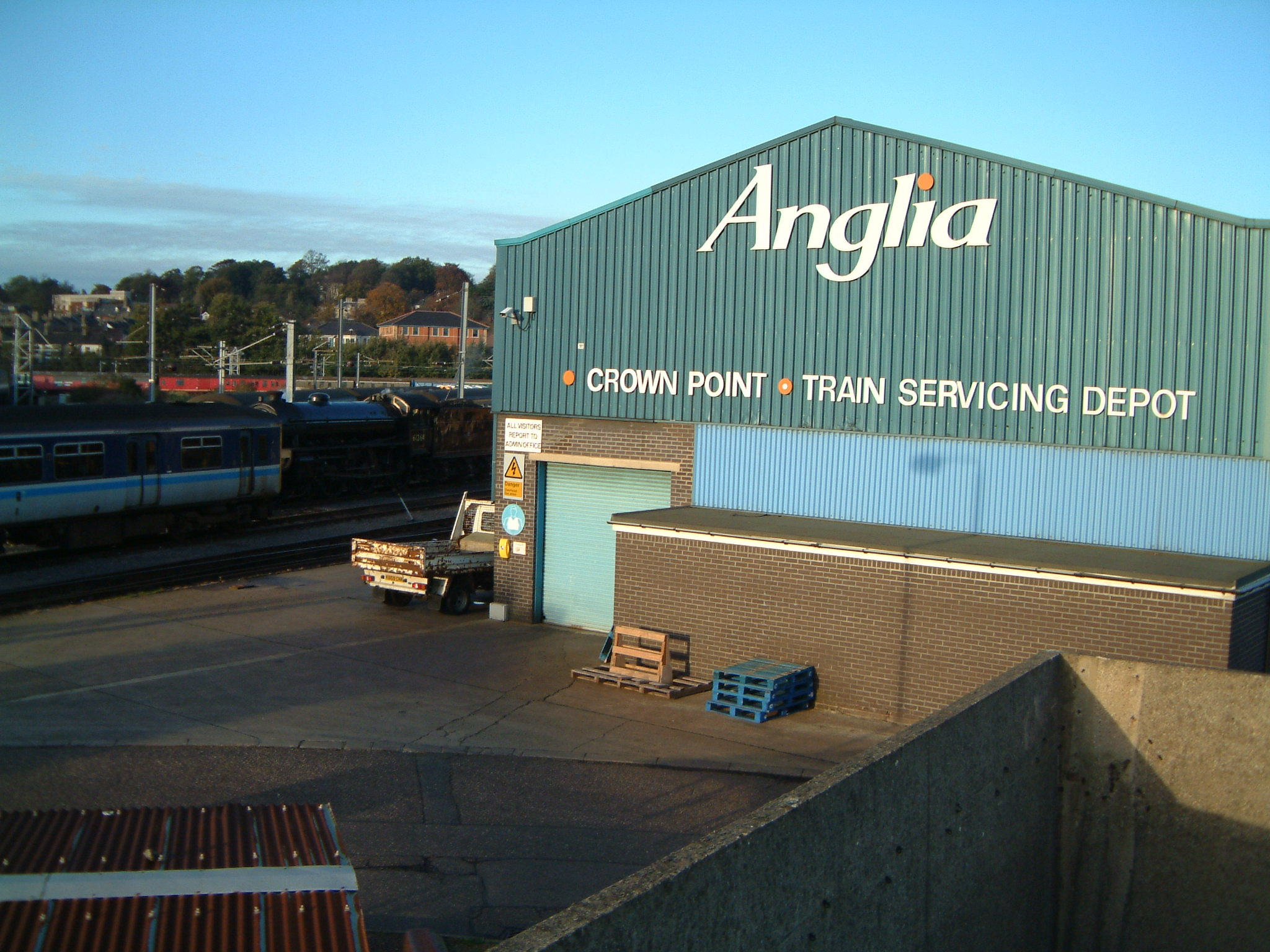
- Crown Point TMD in November 2001
- Interactive map of Crown Point TMD

Location
- Location: Norwich, England
- Coordinates: 52.6221°N 1.3176°E
- OS grid: TG246078

Characteristics
- Owner: Network Rail
- Operator: Greater Anglia
- Depot code: NR (1982-1983); NC (1983-)
- Type: Diesel, Electric, DMU

History
- Opened: 27 October 1982
- Original: British Rail

Crown Point TMD is a train maintenance depot in Norwich, England.

== History ==
Work began on building Crown Point TMD in 1980. It was built on a triangular 12-acre site between the Great Eastern and Wherry Lines to the east of Norwich station. It was opened on 27 October 1982, by the chairman of the British Railways Board, Peter Parker.

It replaced Norwich engine shed and allowed InterCity trains that had been serviced at Great Yarmouth to move to a central location. It was electrified in 1985, along with the Great Eastern Main Line.

As part of the privatisation of British Rail, in 1997, it was taken over by Anglia Railways. It has since passed with the East Anglia franchise to National Express East Anglia and Greater Anglia. Central Trains also serviced rolling stock here until January 1998, transferring its work to LNWR at Cambridge.

In 2018, a refurbishment of the depot, undertaken by Taylor Woodrow Construction, commenced to accommodate new Class 745 and 755 fleets.
