= Whitlingham railway station =

Former railway station in Norfolk, England

Coordinates: 52.6254°N 1.3477°E

Whitlingham
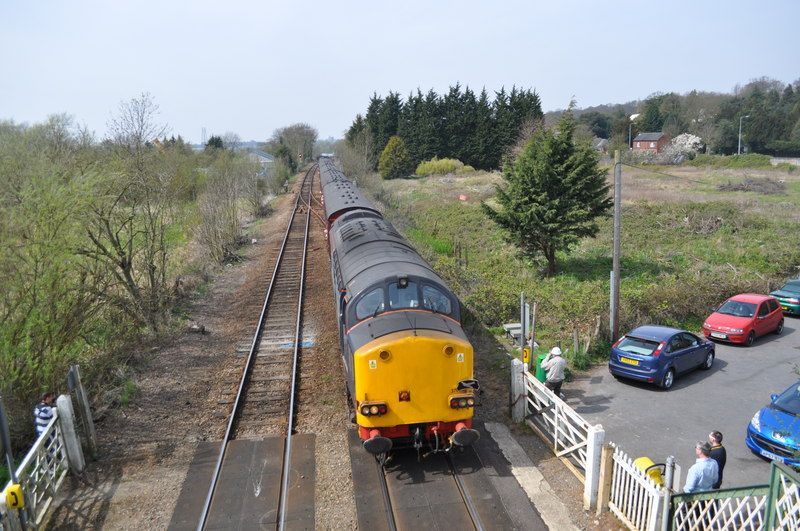
- View of the site from the footbridge, looking west towards Norwich

General information
- Location: Whitlingham and Thorpe St Andrew, South Norfolk; England
- Grid reference: TG267082
- Platforms: 2

Other information
- Status: Disused

History
- Pre-grouping: Great Eastern Railway
- Post-grouping: London and North Eastern Railway; Eastern Region of British Railways

Key dates
- 20 October 1874: Opened
- 19 September 1955: Closed to passengers
- 13 July 1964: Closed to freight
Location

Whitlingham was a station serving the hamlet of Whitlingham and town of Thorpe St Andrew in Norfolk, England. The station was demolished following its closure, leaving only the footbridge in place to allow pedestrians to cross the railway without the use of the level crossing.

To the east of the extant footbridge is the junction where services to Sheringham split from services to Lowestoft and Great Yarmouth.

Former Services

Preceding station	Historical railways	Following station
Norwich Thorpe; Line and station open	Great Eastern Railway	Salhouse; Line and station open
Trowse; Line open, station closed	Great Eastern Railway	Brundall Gardens; Line and station open
