= Yarmouth and Norwich Railway =

Overview
- Dates of operation: 1844–1845
- Successor: Norfolk Railway

Technical
- Track gauge: 4 ft 8 1/2 in (1,435 mm) standard gauge

Yarmouth and Norwich Railway Act 1842
- Act of Parliament
- Parliament of the United Kingdom
- Long title: An Act for making a Railway from Great Yarmouth to Norwich in the County of Norfolk.
- Citation: 5 & 6 Vict. c. lxxxii

Dates
- Royal assent: 18 June 1842

Other legislation
- Repealed by: Norfolk Railway Act 1845

Status: Repealed

Text of statute as originally enacted

The Yarmouth and Norwich Railway (Y&NR) was the earliest railway in Norfolk, England. It was formed after it became apparent that it would be a number of years before the Eastern Counties Railway would extend their railway into Norfolk.

Its act of Parliament, the Yarmouth and Norwich Railway Act 1842 (5 & 6 Vict. c. lxxxii) of 18 June 1842 authorised the issue of £200,000 worth of shares to build a line between the two towns in its name, via Reedham and the Yare valley. The act laid out fees for the carriage of coal (which would arrive at Yarmouth by sea), bricks, iron, stone, fish and cotton as well as passengers.

== People ==
The chairman was George Stephenson and the chief engineer was his son Robert assisted by George Parker Bidder whilst the main contractor was Morton Peto. Shareholders included Sir Edmund Henry Knowles Lacon, John Edward Lacon (banker), Charles John Palmer (solicitor) and William Hurry Palmer (shipbuilder).

== Opening ==
Robert Stephenson calculated the line would take around 18 months to build at a cost of £7,000 per mile. Construction started in April 1843 by contractors Grissel and Peto and the 20.5 miles were completed in a year although the cost was £10,000 per mile rather than the forecast £7,000. An inspection/inaugural run on 12 April 1844 and a ceremonial opening on 30 April 1844, where a train ran from Norwich to Great Yarmouth carrying 200 guests and a brass band followed by "an elegant collation" followed by a return journey of 44 minutes and more lavish festivities in the evening.

== Operation ==
Regular passenger operation began on 1 May 1844 with a passenger service of seven trains each way.

As well as the station at Norwich, which was located next to the existing Norwich station and later served as a goods depot, there were five intermediate stations on the line at:

- Brundall
- Buckenham
- Cantley
- Reedham
- Berney Arms

The terminus at Great Yarmouth later became Yarmouth Vauxhall railway station.

The Y&NR acquired five locomotives and 15 carriages to operate the service.

The Y&NR was the first railway in the UK to install block signaling making use of the Cooke & Wheatstone Electric telegraph for this purpose. Members of the public were also allowed to use the system to send messages which the company would then deliver to the recipient.

== Merger ==
The Y&NR was merged with the Norwich and Brandon Railway on 30 June 1845, just prior to the opening of the latter, to form the Norfolk Railway, itself a founding constituent of the Great Eastern Railway amalgamation in 1862. The route is now part of the Wherry Lines.
