= Wherry Lines =

Railway branch lines in Norfolk and Suffolk, England

Coordinates: 52.5656°N 1.5599°E

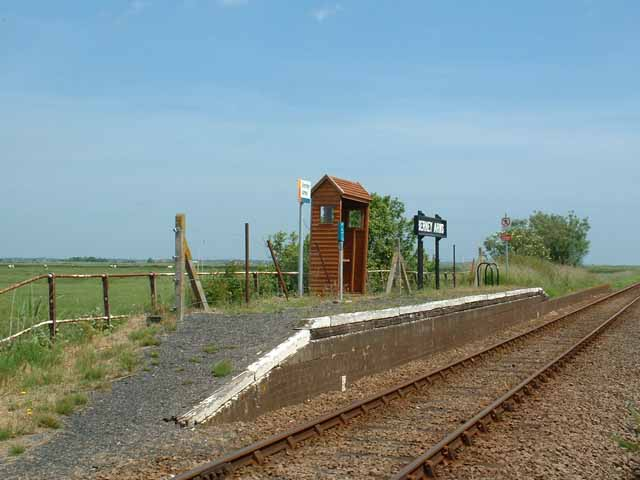
- Berney Arms, on the Wherry Lines, is one of the remotest and least-used stations in the country

Overview
- Status: Operational
- Owner: Network Rail
- Locale: East of England
- Termini: Norwich; Great Yarmouth / Lowestoft
- Stations: 14

Service
- Type: Heavy rail
- System: National Rail
- Services: 3
- Operator: Greater Anglia
- Rolling stock: Class 755 "FLIRT"

Technical
- Track length: Norwich to Great Yarmouth via Acle: 18 miles 29 chains (29.6 km); Norwich to Great Yarmouth via Reedham: 20 miles 45 chains (33.1 km); Norwich to Lowestoft: 23 miles 41 chains (37.8 km)
- Number of tracks: 1-2
- Character: Rural line
- Track gauge: 1,435 mm (4 ft 8 1/2 in) standard gauge
- Operating speed: 60 miles per hour (97 km/h)

The Wherry Lines are railway branch lines in the East of England, linking Norwich with Great Yarmouth and Lowestoft. There are 14 stations on the lines, including the three termini. They form part of Network Rail Strategic Route 7, SRS 07.11 and are classified as a rural line.

The lines pass through the Broads of Norfolk and Suffolk. The name is taken from the Norfolk wherries, which played an important role in the transport of goods and people around the Broads before road and rail transport became widespread.

Passenger services on the Wherry Lines are currently operated by Greater Anglia.

== History ==
The route was opened from Norwich to Great Yarmouth by the Yarmouth and Norwich Railway in 1844, running via Reedham. The line from Reedham to Lowestoft was added in 1847 by Samuel Morton Peto as part of the Norfolk Railway. Finally, the northern route from Norwich to Great Yarmouth via Acle was added in 1883 by the Great Eastern Railway, opening from Breydon Junction to Acle on 12 March, and through to Brundall on 1 June.

== Service ==
The typical Monday-Saturday off-peak service on the Wherry Lines is as follows: (Note: Not all services in the table below stop at every station listed.)

| Operator | Route | Rolling stock | Typical frequency |
|---|---|---|---|
| Greater Anglia | Lowestoft - Oulton Broad North - Somerleyton - Haddiscoe - Reedham - Cantley - Brundall - Norwich | Class 755 | 1 per hour in each direction |
| Greater Anglia | Great Yarmouth - Acle - Lingwood - Brundall - Brundall Gardens - Norwich | Class 755 | 1 per hour in each direction |
| Greater Anglia | Great Yarmouth - Berney Arms - Reedham - Cantley - Brundall - Norwich | Class 755 | 3 per day in each direction |

== Community rail ==
In 2007, the route was designated as having community rail services as part of the Community Rail Development Strategy; this aims to increase patronage and income, improve cost control and develop a greater sense of community involvement.

== Infrastructure ==

The line from Norwich to Lowestoft is double-tracked throughout; the two branches to Great Yarmouth that diverge from Brundall, the route via Acle and from Reedham via Berney Arms, are single-tracked, although the former was once double-tracked throughout.

The Wherry Lines are not electrified, hence services are formed by bi-mode multiple units. The route has a loading gauge of W8, except between Lowestoft and Oulton Broad North where it is W6; there is a maximum line speed of 60 miles per hour (97 km/h).

Of the lines' 14 stations, two are lightly served; these are:

- Berney Arms, which typically sees four trains call on weekdays and Saturdays, with eight on Sundays
- Buckenham, which sees two trains call on weekdays and Saturdays, with thirteen on Sundays.

At most of the stations on the Wherry Lines, service frequencies are increased during the summer months.

The signalling system was modernised in 2018–19. The line between Reedham and Great Yarmouth was closed from 20 October 2018 and was scheduled to open again in April 2019; a bus replacement service was available during the works. In January 2019, it was reported that the project was overrunning and that the line between Reedham and Great Yarmouth would not reopen in April 2019 as scheduled. No firm date was initially given as to when the line would reopen, but the Great Yarmouth-Reedham line finally reopened on 24 February 2020.

== Rolling stock ==
Passenger services are operated by Greater Anglia, typically using Class 755 bi-mode multiple units.

=== Former stock ===
Services were typically operated by Class 156 diesel multiple units from the late 1980s until 2019.

In 2015, Transport UK East Anglia introduced DRS Class 37 locomotive-hauled services due to a shortage of rolling stock as the route is not electrified. These ceased following the introduction of the Class 755s in 2019.

Some summer Saturday services were extended beyond Norwich from London Liverpool Street, which ran to and from Great Yarmouth. These services were formed of Class 90 electric locomotives with Mark 3 coaches, which were hauled from Norwich by a Class 47 diesel locomotive. The services have now ceased, favouring connections with existing local services; this is due to the complexity of the coupling and uncoupling and other issues which led to poor reliability of the mainline operation.

On Mondays to Saturdays from 2018, one service in each direction between Norwich and Lowestoft was operated by East Midlands Railway's Class 158 Express Sprinter units. The service ran in the early morning on both journeys.
