= Thorpe St Andrew =

Town in Norfolk, England

Coordinates: 52.63545°N 1.3431°E

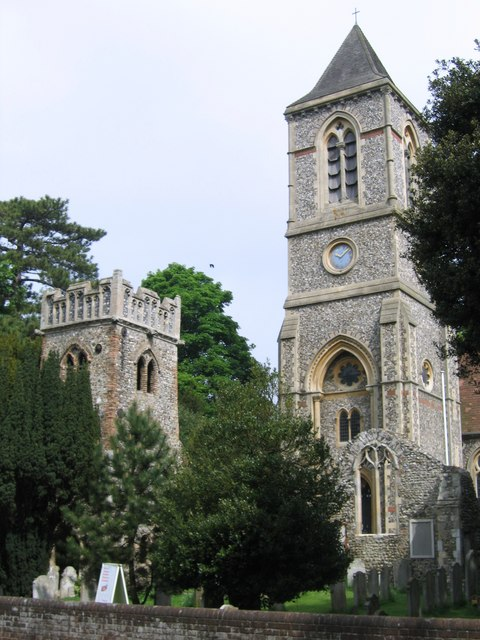
- The church of St. Andrew, at Thorpe St Andrew Church. In front of the Victorian building are the ruins of the medieval church destroyed by fire in the nineteenth century

- Location within Norfolk
- Parish map showing main portion and island exclave
- Area: 7.08 km^{2} (2.73 sq mi)
- Population: 14,526 (2021 census)
  - Density: 2,052/km^{2} (5,310/sq mi)
- OS grid reference: TG263094
- Civil parish: Thorpe St Andrew
- District: Broadland
- Shire county: Norfolk
- Region: East
- Country: England
- Sovereign state: United Kingdom
- Post town: NORWICH
- Postcode district: NR7
- Dialling code: 01603
- Police: Norfolk
- Fire: Norfolk
- Ambulance: East of England
- UK Parliament: Norwich North

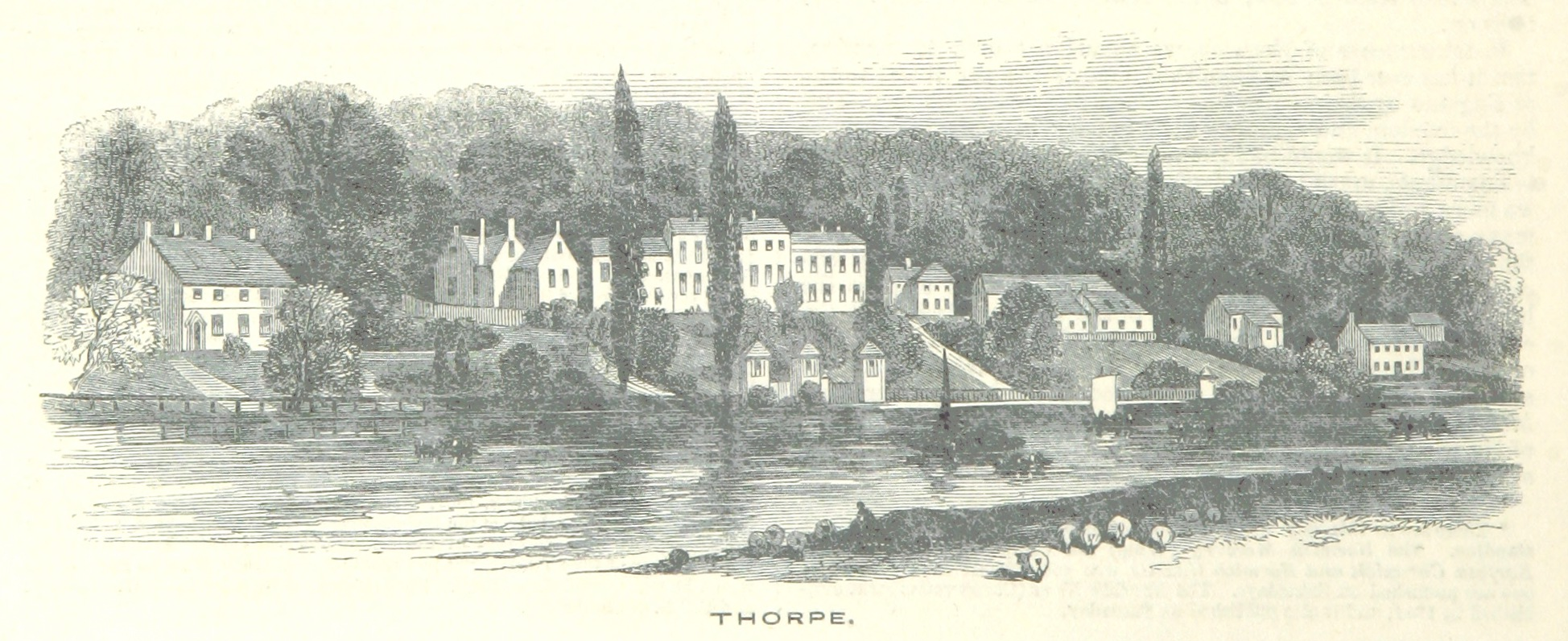
View of Thorpe in 1851

Thorpe St Andrew is a town and civil parish in the Broadland district of Norfolk, England. It is situated on the River Yare, two miles east of the centre of Norwich, and is outside the boundary of the city. The civil parish has an area of 708 ha (2.73 sq mi; 7.08 km^{2}; 1,750 acres) and had a population of 14,526 at the 2021 census; a drop from 14,556 at the 2011 census which was an increase from the 2001 figure of 13,762. It is the administrative headquarters of the Broadland district council.

== History ==
Thorpe is in the Domesday Book, in which it is spelt ‘Torp’, which is a Scandinavian word meaning village (see Thorp). It is thought that the Danes were in East Anglia as early as 870 AD and in 1004 Sweyn and his ships came up the river to Norwich.

There is also evidence that Thorpe was occupied by the Romans with the discovery of various remains. The earliest references found that relate to the parish are under the names of ‘Thorpe Episcopi’ and ‘Thorpe-next-Norwich’. In later years, it has been known as ‘Thorpe St Andrew’. The Norfolk County Asylum was established in the town in May 1814.

East Anglia's worst rail crash happened at Thorpe St Andrew in 1874, killing 25 people and injuring 75.

Parts of the original town can still be seen along the Yarmouth Road leading out of Norwich. Features here include St Andrew's parish church, the former parish infants school, the Rivergarden public house and the multi-gabled Buck public house.

== Facilities ==
There are numerous leisure facilities, groups and organisations including the County Arts indoor and outdoor bowling club on Plumstead Road, Thorpe Kite Flyers and the Starlight Express Majorettes. The Yare Boat Club is situated on Thorpe Island, opposite the Rivergarden, and offers rowing on the River Yare.

The local secondary school is Thorpe St Andrew School; it was established in its present form in 1977. The high school is fed by several small primary schools from the local villages along with 3 large primary schools within Thorpe St Andrew. These schools are Dussindale, St Williams and Hillside.

In recent years, Thorpe St Andrew has expanded eastwards in the shape of the Dussindale housing development, which includes Dussindale Primary School, which opened in 2007 and Broadland business park.

Thorpe St Andrew is home to radio station 99.9 Radio Norwich. The studios are based near Thorpe River Green and the station started broadcasting on 29 June 2006.

Thorpe lies on the River Yare which is part of the Norfolk Broads network of navigable rivers. Thorpe Green is on the main Yarmouth Road and gives access to the river with the opposite bank being an island after the creation of the new cut which allowed vessels to make their way to and from the city of Norwich without traversing the town via two low bridges that carry the railway to Yarmouth, Lowestoft, Cromer and Sheringham. Once the location of thriving boat yards, Thorpe Island now offers mooring for mainly liveaboard vessels. The only operating boat yards in Thorpe are now towards the east of the town where there are two hire boat operators as well as private facilities and boat building operations.

A commemorative World War One plaque stands at the River Green war memorial site. It was unveiled on 4 August 2014 by two local schoolchildren, Harry and Aimee Fuller who attended Hillside Avenue Primary School.

== Roads ==
Thorpe St Andrew is bisected by two major roads running from East to West: the A1042 and A1242. The A1242 or Yarmouth Road is part of the old Norwich to Great Yarmouth road.

== Notable people ==
- Sir George Henry Morse (1857–1931), mountaineer and Lord Mayor of Norwich.
- Peter Trudgill (born 1943), one of the pioneers of sociolinguistics in Britain, was born and brought up in the area.
