= Cantley railway station =

Railway station in Norfolk, England

Coordinates: 52.57805°N 1.51277°E

Cantley
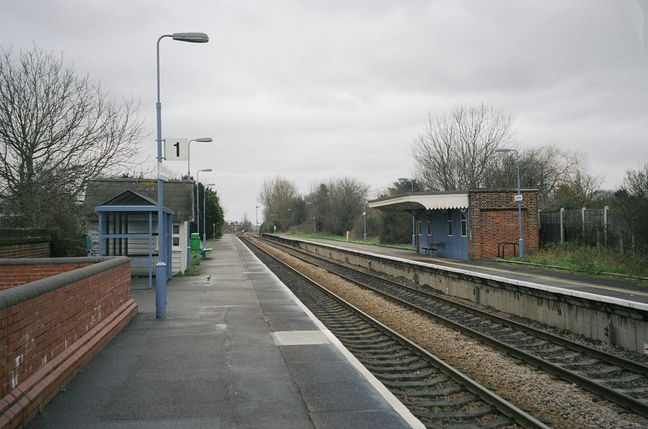
- Cantley station, looking west

General information
- Location: Cantley, Broadland, Norfolk; England
- Grid reference: TG381036
- Manager: Greater Anglia
- Platforms: 2

Other information
- Station code: CNY
- Classification: DfT category F2

History
- Original company: Yarmouth and Norwich Railway; Norfolk Railway; Eastern Counties Railway
- Pre-grouping: Great Eastern Railway
- Post-grouping: London and North Eastern Railway

Key dates
- 1 May 1844: Opened
- September 1847: Closed (NR)
- January 1851: Reopened (ECR)

Passengers
- 2021/22: ▲14,776
- 2022/23: ▲15,740
- 2023/24: ▲18,298
- 2024/25: ▲20,390
- 2025/26: ▲20,750
Location
Notes
- Passenger statistics from the Office of Rail and Road

Cantley railway station is a stop on the Wherry Lines in the East of England, serving the village of Cantley, Norfolk. It is 10 miles (16 km) down the line from Norwich on the routes to Lowestoft and Great Yarmouth; it is situated between Buckenham and Reedham. Its three-letter station code is CNY.

== History ==
The Yarmouth and Norwich Railway Act 1842 (5 & 6 Vict. c. lxxxii) authorising the Yarmouth and Norwich Railway (Y&NR), the first public railway line in Norfolk, received royal assent on 18 June 1842. Work started on the line in April 1843 and it opened on 1 May 1844. In June 1845, the Y&NR was amalgamated with the Norwich and Brandon Railway and Cantley station became a Norfolk Railway asset.

In 1847, the station was closed due to lack of traffic. The Eastern Counties Railway (ECR) took over the Norfolk Railway in May 1848 and the station reopened in 1851. In August 1862, all railways in East Anglia were consolidated to form the Great Eastern Railway (GER). The Railways Act 1921 led to the creation of the Big Four companies and the GER amalgamated with several companies to form the London and North Eastern Railway (LNER); Cantley became an LNER station on 1 January 1923. Upon nationalisation in 1947, the station became part of the Eastern Region of British Railways

In 1997, the privatisation of British Rail saw the station and its services transferred to Anglia Railways, which operated the franchise until 2004 when National Express East Anglia assumed responsibility. In 2012, Abellio Greater Anglia won the franchise.

== Services ==
The typical Monday-Saturday service is two-hourly in each direction during off-peak hours, with some additional peak-time services on weekdays; most trains serve the Norwich to Lowestoft line, with two to Great Yarmouth via the Berney Arms branch.

On Sundays, there are hourly services in each direction, with eastbound services alternating between Lowestoft and Great Yarmouth.

Preceding station	National Rail	Following station
Buckenham	Greater Anglia; Wherry Lines	Reedham
