= Norwich railway station =

Railway station in Norfolk, England

Norwich
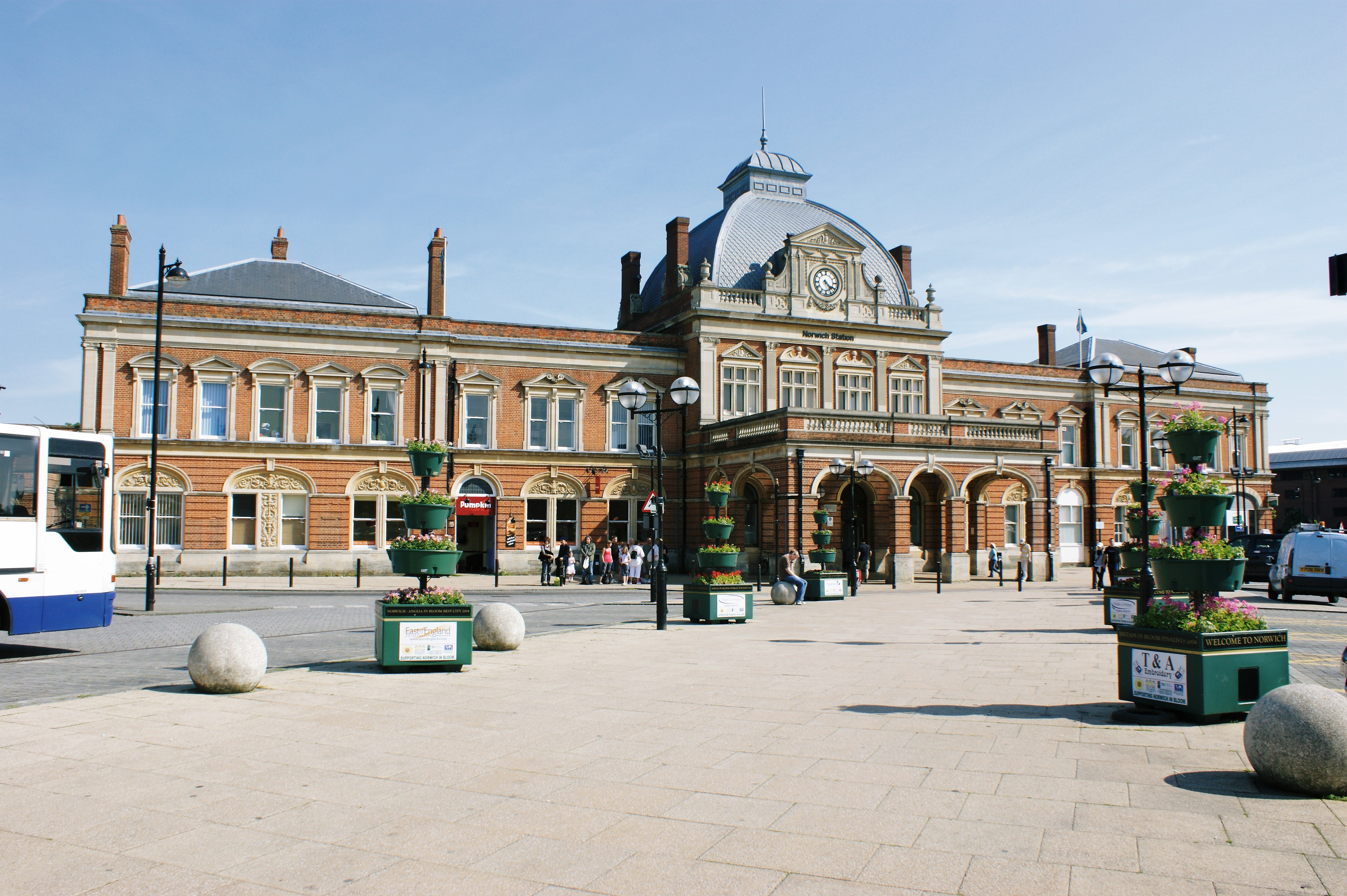
- Norwich station, June 2008

General information
- Location: Norwich, City of Norwich; England
- Coordinates: 52.6269°N 1.3065°E
- Grid reference: TG239083
- Manager: Greater Anglia
- Platforms: 6

Other information
- Station code: NRW
- Classification: DfT category B

History
- Original company: Yarmouth and Norwich Railway; Norfolk Railway; Eastern Counties Railway; Great Eastern Railway
- Post-grouping: London and North Eastern Railway

Key dates
- 1 May 1844: Opened as Norwich
- 12 December 1849: Renamed Norwich Thorpe
- 3 May 1886: Resited
- 5 May 1969: Renamed Norwich

Passengers
- 2020/21: ▼0.968 million
- Interchange: ▼0.113 million
- 2021/22: ▲3.214 million
- Interchange: ▲0.358 million
- 2022/23: ▲3.964 million
- Interchange: ▲0.437 million
- 2023/24: ▲4.177 million
- Interchange: ▲0.474 million
- 2024/25: ▲4.557 million
- Interchange: ▲0.554 million
Location
Notes
- Passenger statistics from the Office of Rail and Road

Norwich railway station (formerly Norwich Thorpe) is the northern terminus of the Great Eastern Main Line in the East of England, serving the cathedral city of Norwich, Norfolk. It is 114 miles 77 chains (185 km) down the main line from London Liverpool Street, the southern terminus.

It is also the terminus of numerous secondary lines: the Breckland Line to Cambridge; the Bittern Line to Sheringham; and the Wherry Lines to Great Yarmouth and Lowestoft.

The station is currently managed by Greater Anglia, which also operates the majority of the trains that call. East Midlands Railway operates services to Liverpool Lime Street, via Nottingham, Sheffield and Manchester Piccadilly.

== History ==
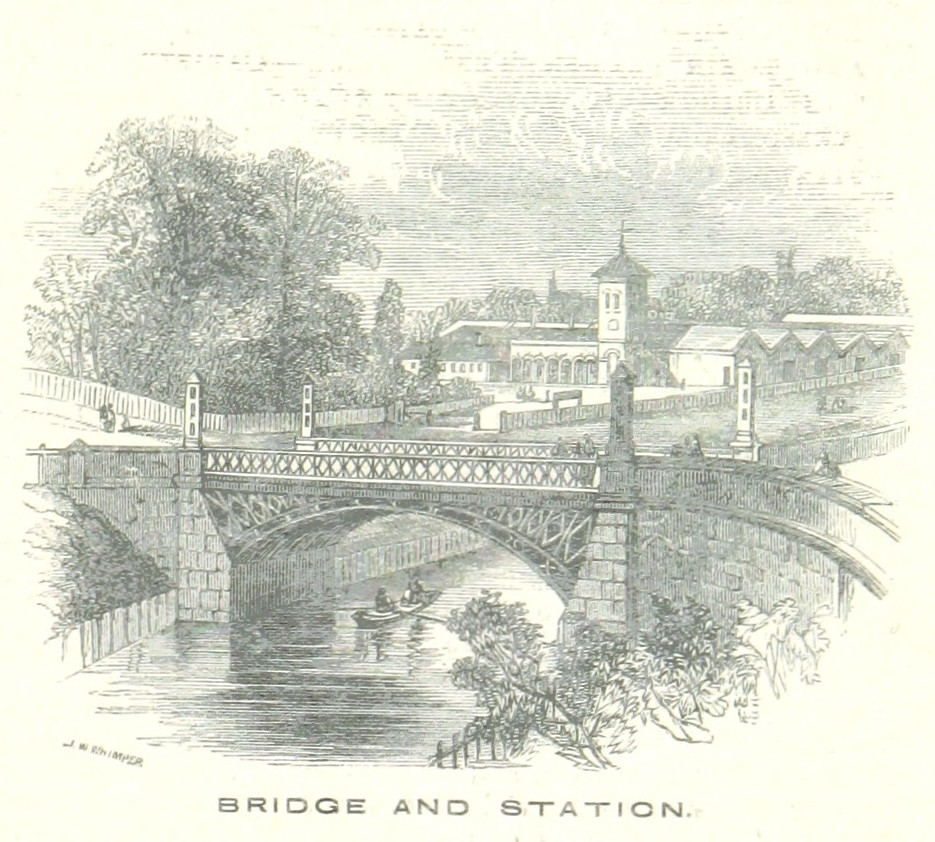
Norwich Thorpe in 1851, before its rebuilding in 1886

At one time, there were three railway stations in Norwich. Norwich Thorpe is the current and only remaining station and still known locally as "Thorpe station". Norwich Victoria was the terminus for some passenger services from London until 1916, as well as being a goods station until its demolition in the 1970s. Norwich City was the terminus of the Midland and Great Northern Joint Railway line from Melton Constable until it was closed to passengers in 1959.

=== Early history ===
The original station was opened by the Yarmouth and Norwich Railway (Y&NR), which was the earliest railway in Norfolk. The Yarmouth and Norwich Railway Act 1842 (5 & 6 Vict. c. lxxxii) of 18 June 1842 authorised the issue of £200,000 worth of shares to build a line between the two towns, via Reedham and the Yare valley. The chairman was George Stephenson and the chief engineer was his son, Robert Stephenson. Construction started in April 1843 and the 20 1/2-mile (33 km) line was completed within a year. There was an inspection and inaugural run on 12 April 1844 and a ceremonial opening on 30 April 1844, followed the next day by the beginning of regular passenger services.

On 18 May 1844, 17 days after the Y&NR started running train services, Parliament gave royal assent to the Norwich and Brandon Railway Act 1844 (7 & 8 Vict. c. xv) authorising the Norwich and Brandon Railway (N&BR). This was part of a plan to link the Y&NR with London, by linking up with the Eastern Counties Railway (ECR) being built from Newport, Essex, to Brandon, Suffolk. Work started quickly during 1844 and went on into 1845. On 30 June 1845, the Norfolk Railway Act 1845 (8 & 9 Vict. c. xli) was passed, authorising the amalgamation of the Y&NR with the N&BR came into effect and Norwich station became a Norfolk Railway asset.

The N&BR line arrived at the station on 15 December 1845, which offered a route to Shoreditch in London via Cambridge and Bishop's Stortford. The Eastern Union Railway (EUR) was building a line towards Norwich and that led to great rivalry between the EUR and the ECR. The ECR trumped the EUR by taking over the Norfolk Railway, including Norwich station, on 8 May 1848. The following year, the EUR started services to Norwich Victoria. The opening of Norwich Victoria on 12 December 1849 led to the ECR naming its station Norwich Thorpe. On 27 August 1851, EUR services from Ipswich started serving the better-placed Thorpe station.

By the 1860s, the railways in East Anglia were in financial trouble and most were leased to the Eastern Counties Railway. They wanted to amalgamate them formally, but government agreement could not be obtained until an act of Parliament, the Great Eastern Railway Act 1862 (25 & 26 Vict. c. ccxxiii), became law on 7 August 1862, when the Great Eastern Railway (GER) was formed by the amalgamation. Actually, Norwich Thorpe and Norwich Victoria became GER stations on 1 July 1862, when the GER took over the ECR and the EUR before the bill had received royal assent.

=== Great Eastern Railway (1862–1922) ===
A decade after the GER was formed, the latter promoted a new line from Norwich to Cromer. That line was opened on 20 October 1874 and a new station was constructed at the junction of the Cromer line and Yarmouth and Norwich line. The new station, Whitlingham, stood between Norwich Thorpe and Brundall on the Yarmouth line.

With traffic growing, it was apparent a new station was required in Norwich. It was built to the north of the original station, opening on 3 May 1886 and is the structure surviving today. The old terminus became part of the expanded goods facilities.

The new station was built, at the cost of £60,000 by Messrs Youngs and Son of Norwich, from designs by Messrs J. Wilson and W. N. Ashbee, the company's engineer and architect respectively. The attractive station building was constructed around a central clock tower (the clock was supplied by Dixons and Co of London Street, Norwich) with two-storey matching wings either side. A portico was built onto the clock-tower section. There was a circulating area with a high ceiling and the roof was supported by ironwork supplied by contractor Barnard Bishop and Barnard. The roof extended partly down the platforms, which were then covered by canopies for part of their length. There were initially five platforms, with engine-release roads between platforms 2 and 3, and 4 and 5, which allowed locomotives to be detached from trains without the need to shunt the carriages out of the station.

The GER and Norwich Thorpe changed little for the next 30 years. On 22 May 1916, the GER closed Trowse station as a wartime economy measure. That meant the first station south of Thorpe on the Ipswich line was Swainsthorpe and the next station west of Thorpe on the Ely line was Hethersett. On 1 April 1919, five months after the end of the war, the GER reopened Trowse station. The GER went out of existence following the creation of the "Big Four" railway companies in 1923.

=== London and North Eastern Railway (1923–1947) ===
On 1 January 1923, the GER amalgamated with several other railways to form the London and North Eastern Railway (LNER). This was as a result of the Railways Act 1921, which saw most of the 120 railway companies grouped into four main companies, in an effort to stem their losses. Norwich Thorpe became an LNER asset.

During World War II, the station was bombed in June 1940 and April 1942.

Following the Transport Act 1947, the Big Four railway companies, including the LNER, were amalgamated into the nationalised British Railways (BR).

=== British Railways (1948–1994) ===
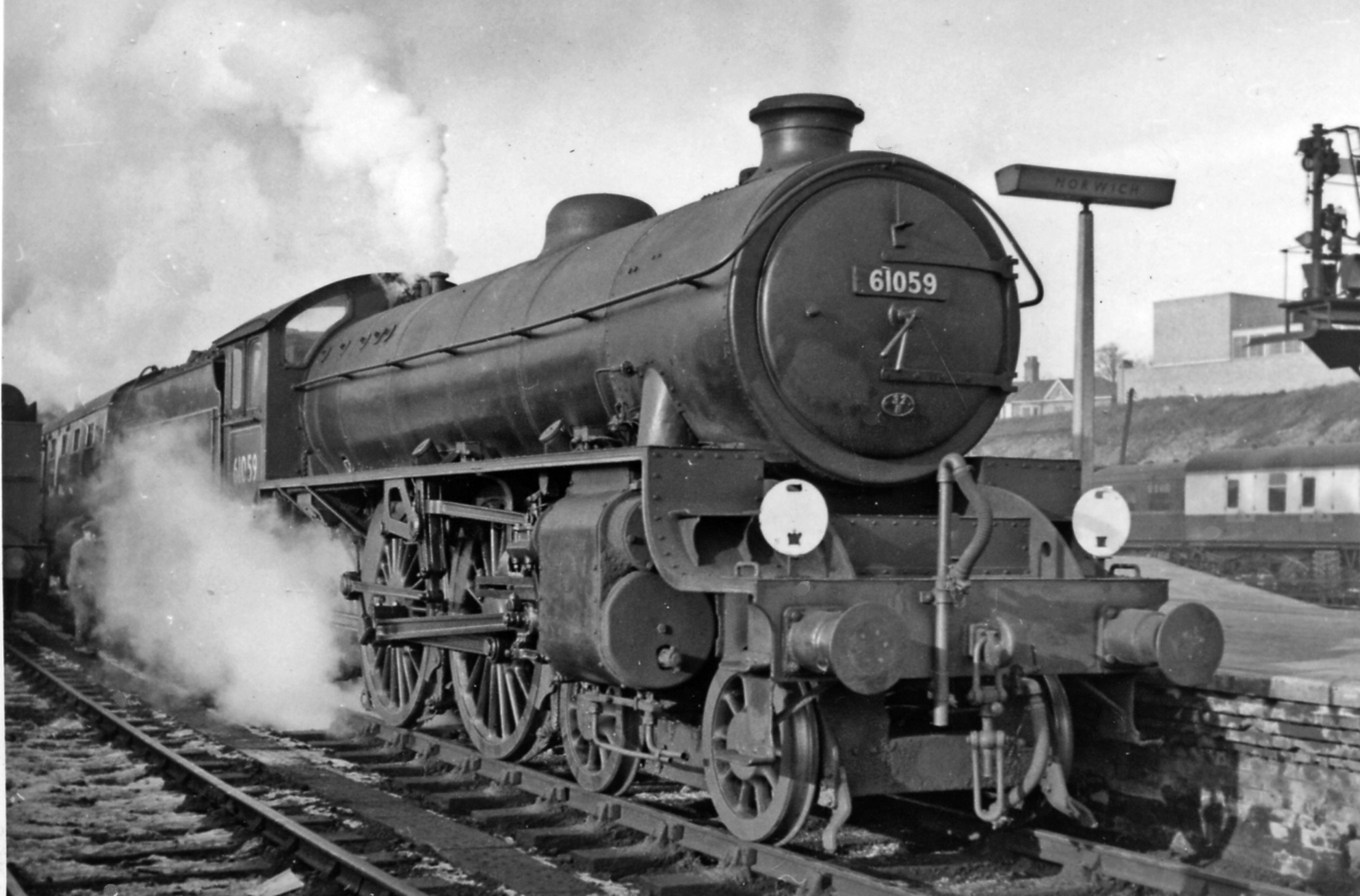
LNER Thompson B1 4-6-0 in January 1958

On 1 January 1948, the nationalisation of Britain's railways saw the operation of Norwich Thorpe station pass to British Railways (Eastern Region).

Platform 6 was added in 1954 and a modern booking hall was built in 1955.

During the late 1950s, steam locomotives were phased out across the East Anglian network and replaced by diesel-powered trains.

After Norwich City station was closed as part of the Beeching cuts, British Rail decided to revert the name of the station to Norwich, which took effect on 5 May 1969.

When the station closed briefly for electrification works in 1986, Trowse, a disused suburban station, was put back into service as the temporary terminus of the line. It closed again when Norwich reopened. The signalling was also modernised at that time and the track layout simplified. On completion of the electrification project, Norwich-London InterCity trains switched from being hauled by Class 47 diesel locomotives to Class 86 electric locomotives.

=== Privatisation era (since 1994) ===
On 1 April 1994, under the Railways Act 1993, ownership of the station passed to a new private company, Railtrack, which was transferred to the state-controlled non-profit Network Rail in October 2002 after experiencing financial difficulties in the aftermath of the Hatfield rail crash.

Services to Norwich were later privatised, with most passing to Anglia Railways in January 1997. Routes towards the West Midlands were taken over by Central Trains in March 1997. Anglia trains handed over their franchise to National Express East Anglia in 2004. Three years later, on 11 November 2007, the Central Trains franchise was broken up and West Midlands services to Norwich were taken over by East Midlands Trains. The National Express East Anglia franchise passed to Abellio Greater Anglia on 5 February 2012. All services operated by East Midlands Trains were transferred to East Midlands Railway in August 2019, after EMT's franchise expired.

The station won the Large Station of the Year award at the National Rail Awards in 2020.

=== Accidents and incidents ===
- On 10 September 1874, the Thorpe rail accident, East Anglia's worst train crash, occurred at Thorpe St Andrew between Norwich Thorpe and Brundall, killing 25 people and injuring 75.
- On 21 January 1881, two passenger trains collided at Norwich Thorpe junction just beyond Carrow Road Bridge. Both trains had their locomotive and leading carriage derailed. There were, however, no casualties.
- On 21 July 2013, in the early hours, a passenger train ran into another which was stabled in Norwich's platform 6, injuring eight people. An investigation blamed driver fatigue.

=== Engine sheds ===
Norwich engine shed was located to the south-west of the station. This depot closed in 1982 and was replaced by a new facility at Crown Point, which is responsible for the maintenance of the main line electric fleet and local diesel multiple units.

== Layout ==
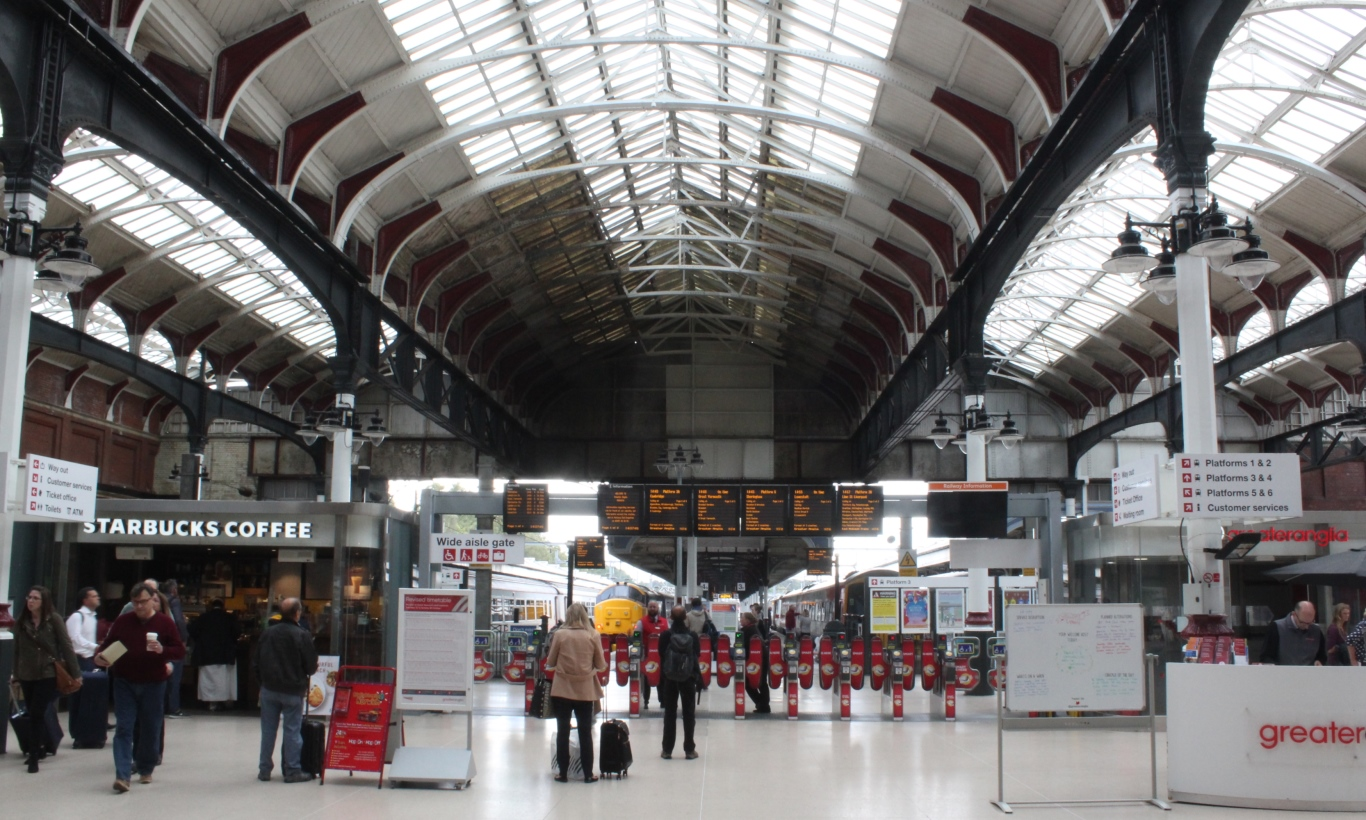
Station concourse with the platforms ahead, September 2018

- Platform 1: Greater Anglia inter-city services to London Liverpool Street and used occasionally for Breckland Line services to Cambridge and Stansted Airport; East Midlands Railway services to Liverpool Lime Street, via Nottingham.
- Platform 2: Greater Anglia inter-city services to London Liverpool Street.
- Platform 3: Greater Anglia inter-city services to London Liverpool Street and services to Cambridge and Stansted Airport; East Midlands Railway services to Liverpool Lime Street.
- Platforms 4-6: Greater Anglia rural services to Great Yarmouth, Lowestoft and Sheringham. Platform 4 is also used occasionally at peak times for inter-city services to London Liverpool Street. Platform 6 is also infrequently used for services to Cambridge and Stansted Airport.

== Services ==
The station is served by Greater Anglia and East Midlands Railway. The typical off-peak service frequency (Monday to Saturday) in trains per hour/day is:

- 1tph to Liverpool Lime Street
- 2tph to London Liverpool Street; of which:
  - 1tph makes additional calls at Stowmarket, Chelmsford and Stratford
- 1tph to Stansted Airport
- 1tph to Sheringham
- 1tph to Lowestoft; of which:
  - 1tp2h calls at Oulton Broad North only
  - 1tpd serves Buckenham
- 1tph to Great Yarmouth, of which:
  - 2tpd run via Cantley, Reedham and Berney Arms
  - The remaining trains run via Lingwood and Acle.

Preceding station	National Rail	Following station
Diss	Greater Anglia Great Eastern Main Line	Terminus
Wymondham	Greater Anglia Breckland Line	Terminus
Terminus	Greater Anglia Bittern Line	Salhouse
Terminus	Greater Anglia Wherry Lines	Brundall Gardens
Thetford	East Midlands Railway Norwich to Liverpool	Terminus
Wymondham Limited service	East Midlands Railway Norwich to Liverpool	Terminus
	Historical railways	
Trowse	Great Eastern Railway Norfolk Railway	Terminus
Whitlingham	Great Eastern Railway Yarmouth and Norwich Railway	Terminus

== Miscellaneous ==
Before carriages were equipped with electric lighting, they were fuelled by gas. Norwich had an oil gas works and carriages north of a line from Harwich to Cambridge were supplied with oil gas. The gas was distributed to other stations in a dedicated fleet of ten tank wagons. Use of the facility declined in the 1930s; although, up until the 1950s, catering vehicles were still supplied.

Children's author Arthur Ransome set the opening paragraph of Coot Club (1934) at Norwich Thorpe station. It also appears in the 1971 film The Go-Between.

== See also ==
- Railways in Norfolk
- Crown Point TMD
