= British Rail Class 755 =

Class of electro-diesel multiple unit trains in England

British Rail Class 755 FLIRT
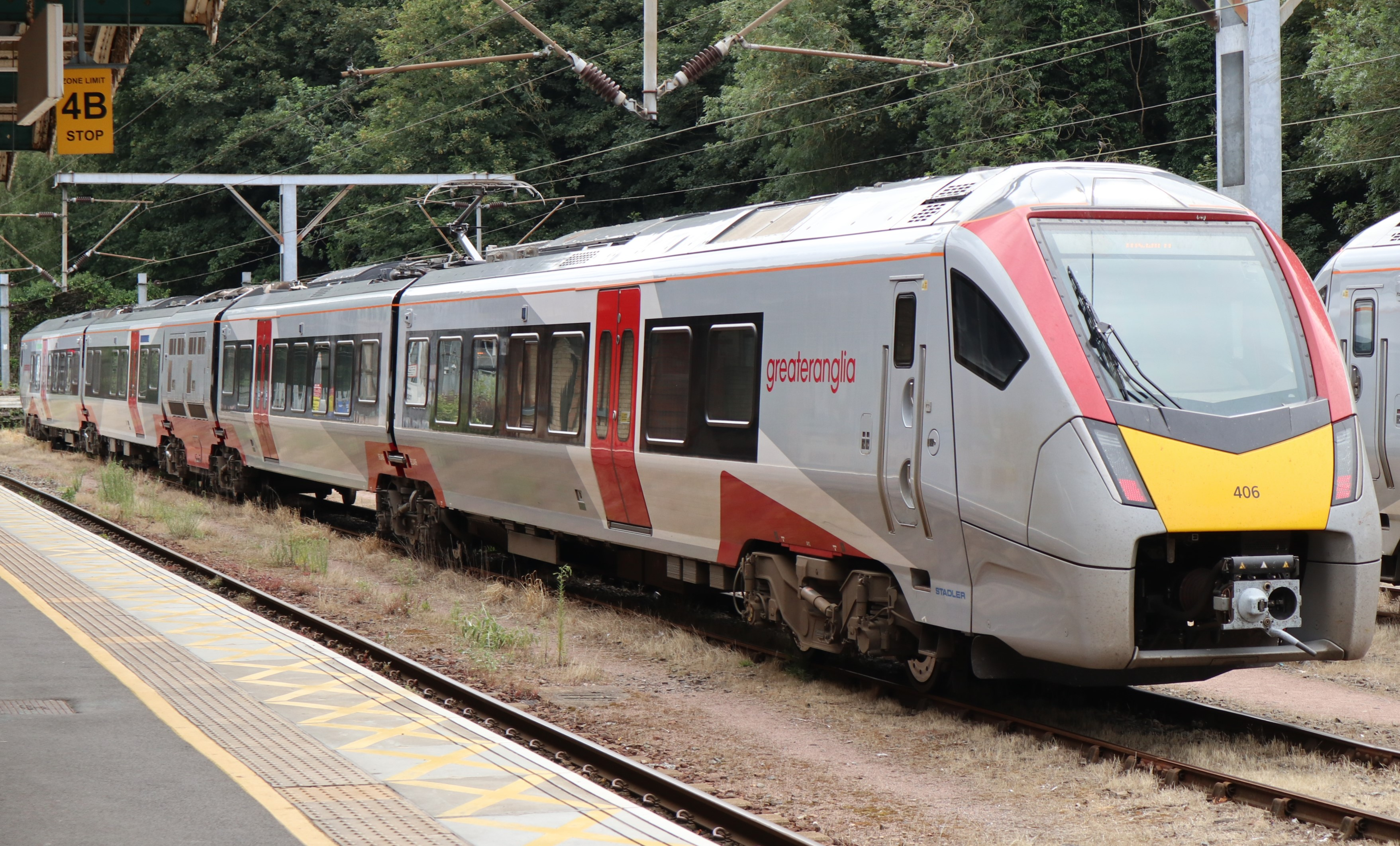
- A Greater Anglia Class 755 unit stabled at Ipswich

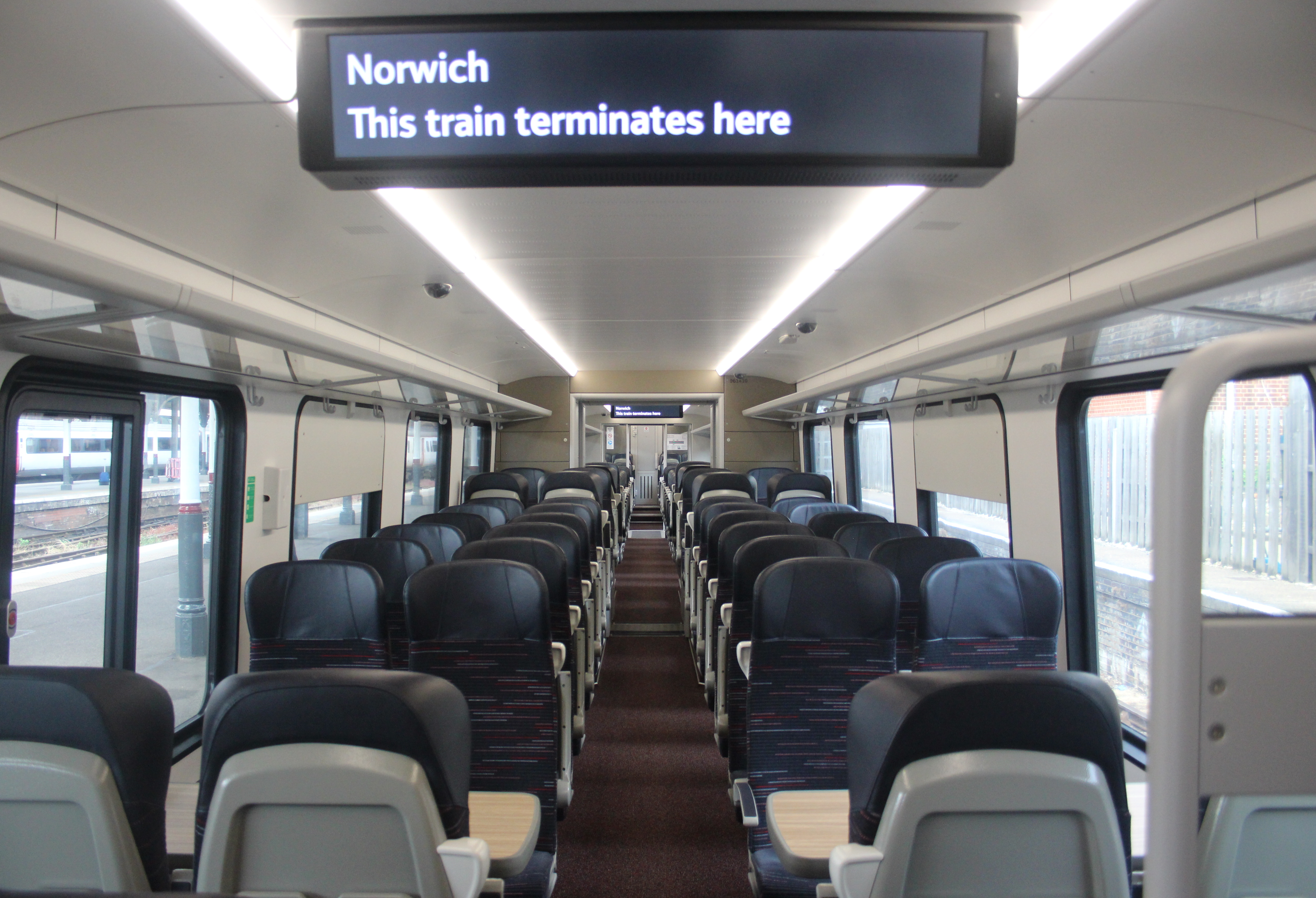
- Standard-class interior of a Class 755 unit
- In service: 29 July 2019 – present
- Manufacturer: Stadler Rail
- Assembly: Stadler Bussnang AG
- Built at: Bussnang, Switzerland; Siedlce, Poland
- Family name: FLIRT
- Replaced: Class 37 locomotives & Mk. 2 carriages, Class 153, Class 156, Class 170
- Constructed: 2018–2020
- Number built: 38 (14 × 755/3, 24 × 755/4)
- Formation: 3 cars per 755/3 unit: (Note: The power pack is technically a fourth or fifth vehicle in 755/3 and 755/4 units respectively but, as it contains no passenger accommodation, it is excluded from the count of passenger cars.); DMSO-PP-PTSOW-DMSO; 4 cars per 755/4 unit: DMSO-PTSO-PP-PTSOW-DMSO
- Fleet numbers: 755/3: 755325–755338; 755/4: 755401–755424
- Capacity: 755/3: 144 seats plus 23 tip-up; 755/4: 202 seats plus 27 tip-up
- Owner: Rock Rail
- Operator: Greater Anglia
- Depots: Crown Point TMD, Norwich
- Line served: East Anglian regional routes

Specifications
- Car body construction: Aluminium
- Train length: 755/3: 65.0 m (213 ft 3 in); 755/4: 80.7 m (264 ft 9 in)
- Width: Passenger vehicles: 2.720 m (8 ft 11.1 in); Power Pack: 2.822 m (9 ft 3.1 in)
- Height: 3.915 m (12 ft 10.1 in)
- Floor height: 960 mm (3 ft 2 in)
- Doors: Double-leaf sliding plug, each 1.300 m (4 ft 3.2 in) wide (1 per side per car)
- Wheel diameter: Powered: 870 mm (34 in); Unpowered: 760 mm (30 in)
- Wheelbase: Bogies: 2.700 m (8 ft 10.3 in)
- Maximum speed: 100 mph (160 km/h)
- Traction system: IGBT
- Prime mover: Deutz 16-litre V8 turbo-diesel (2 per 755/3, 4 per 755/4)
- Power output: On AC power: 2,600 kW (3,500 hp); On diesel power: 755/3: 960 kW (1,290 hp); 755/4: 1,920 kW (2,570 hp)
- Acceleration: On AC power: 755/3: 1.3 m/s^{2} (4.3 ft/s^{2}); 755/4: 1.1 m/s^{2} (3.6 ft/s^{2}); On diesel power: 755/3: 0.7 m/s^{2} (2.3 ft/s^{2}); 755/4: 0.9 m/s^{2} (3.0 ft/s^{2})
- Electric system: 25 kV 50 Hz AC overhead
- Current collection: Pantograph
- UIC classification: 755/3: Bo′2′2′2′Bo′; 755/4: Bo′2′2′2′2′Bo′
- Safety systems: AWS; TPWS; (plus provision for ETCS)
- Coupling system: Dellner
- Multiple working: Within class (max. 3 units)
- Track gauge: 4 ft 8 1/2 in (1,435 mm) standard gauge

Notes/references
- Sourced from unless otherwise noted.

The British Rail Class 755 is a class of bi-mode multiple unit passenger train built by Stadler Rail for Greater Anglia. Part of the FLIRT (Fast Light Innovative Regional Train) modular train grouping, the trains first entered service on 29 July 2019, and are used on regional and local services throughout East Anglia as well as for inter-city services between Norwich and London Liverpool Street.

== History ==
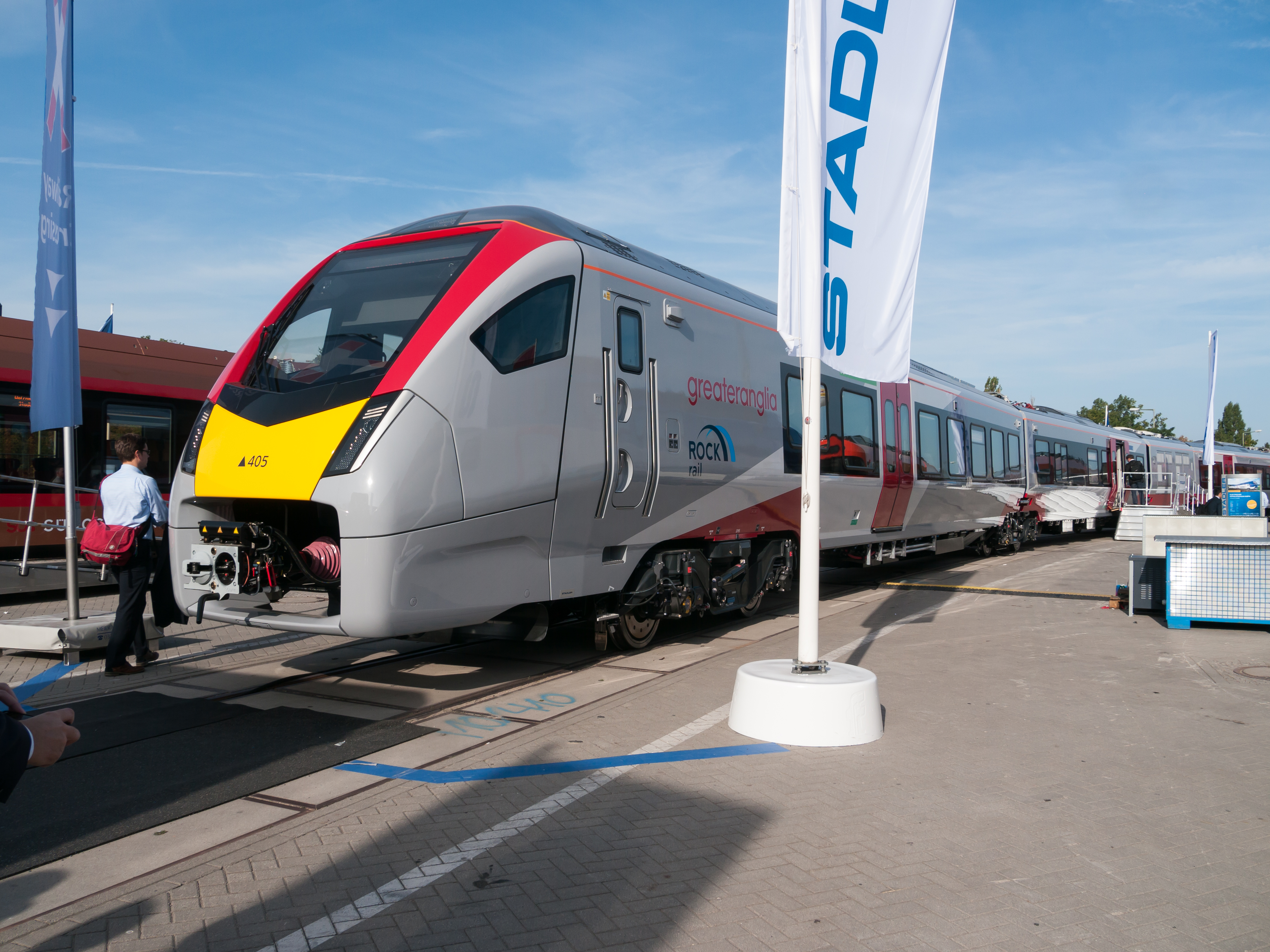
A Class 755 at InnoTrans 2018 in Berlin, Germany

In August 2016, Greater Anglia was awarded the East Anglia franchise with a commitment to replace all of the existing fleet with modern trains; an order was placed with Stadler Rail for 38 bi-mode multiple units from the FLIRT grouping. The order was financed by rolling stock company (ROSCO) Rock Rail. These new trains were classified as Class 755. The order was made up of 14 three-car 755/3 sets and 24 four-car 755/4 sets, intended to replace the diesel Class 153, Class 156 and Class 170 fleets. Alongside the related electric multiple units of Class 745, the units are maintained at Norwich's Crown Point TMD.

The plan was for the units to be assigned to Greater Anglia's more local and regional routes throughout Norfolk and Suffolk, which include the Wherry Lines and the Bittern Line; the units would also be assigned to services on the Breckland Line, Ipswich–Ely line, the Felixstowe and Sudbury branch lines. Compared with the diesel multiple units they replaced, the 755s have more seats, mains and USB sockets, faster wi-fi, air conditioning and improved passenger information systems. The floor is lower than usual because the trains have power-packs to contain the diesel generators, providing better accessibility to wheelchair and pushchair users.

== Operation ==
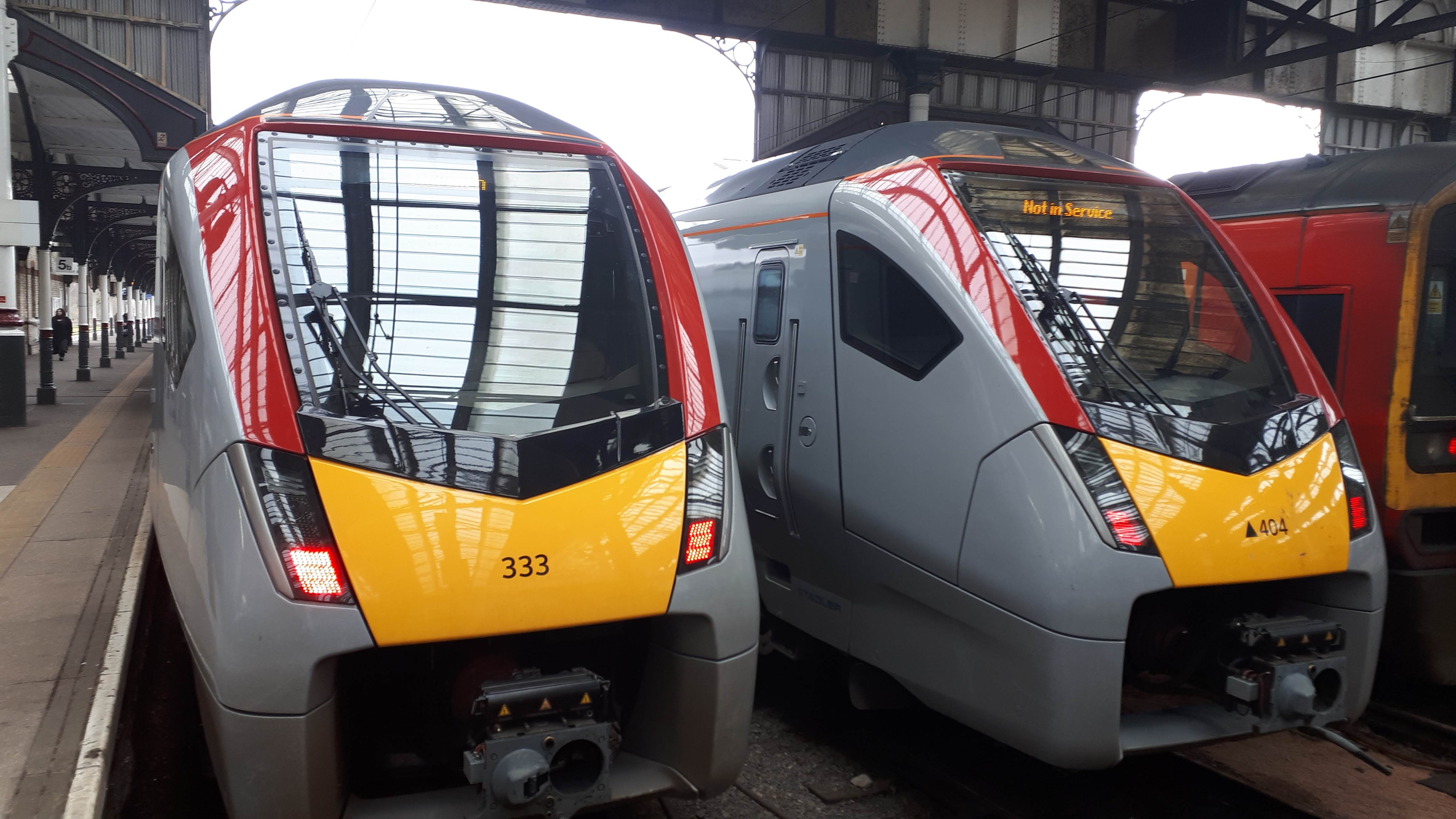
Class 755s at Norwich, 2020

The first unit was delivered in November 2018, which gave an initial entry into service date planned for May 2019. By May 2019, the trains had not been authorised to enter service yet and instead were given a service date for the end of June or beginning of July. Following this, the trains were authorised to enter service on 30 May 2019 by the Office of Rail and Road and they did so by 29 July 2019.

As more units gradually entered service, Greater Anglia was able to withdraw all of its older second-generation diesel multiple-unit trains in favour of the 755s. The delay in all units entering service was caused by some initial multiple faults. Despite this, the Class 755 was named the most reliable diesel multiple unit in both 2021 and 2022.

The train has been nicknamed "Basils" by people living on the routes that the Class 755 operates on.

== Technical details ==
Class 755 units have three or four passenger vehicles, along with a separate "power pack" vehicle, near to the centre of the unit that can be fitted with up to four Deutz 16-litre V8 diesel engines and generators. Class 755/4 units have four engines, while 755/3 units have two (mounted diagonally opposite each other).

All vehicles are linked by unpowered Jacobs bogies, while the outermost bogie at each end of each unit carries the traction motors. The unusual layout for a British train allows a lower than normal floor level, enabling step-free boarding at standard-height platforms. Pantographs are mounted on the intermediate cars.

== Accidents and incidents ==
=== New Rackheath ===
On 24 November 2019, unit 755416 was approaching a level crossing at New Rackheath, in Norfolk, at 45 mph (72 km/h) when the barriers lifted as the train was 200 m (660 ft) from the crossing; cars started crossing in front of the train. The driver of 755416 initiated an emergency brake application, but the train was unable to stop until it was 230 m (750 ft) beyond the level crossing. A collision was avoided by less than half a second.

The Rail Accident Investigation Branch opened an investigation into the incident. In response, Greater Anglia imposed a temporary 20 mph (32 km/h) speed restriction over six level crossings on the Bittern Line. The cause of the incident was contamination of the track interfering with detection of the train by track circuits. The equipment had been set to open the crossing 16 seconds after a loss of signal.

As a result of the incident, flange lubricators were removed from the class. The equipment operating the level crossing was reset to open the level crossing 99 seconds after a loss of signal and computer program on the train was rewritten to remove a ten-second delay in the application of sand in the event of wheelslide. The frequency of Rail Head Treatment Trains over the Bittern Line was increased from weekdays only to daily during the autumn.

=== Reedham and Haddiscoe ===
On 30 January 2022, unit 755331 became stranded between Reedham and Haddiscoe, due to damaged track on the Haddiscoe Cut section of the Wherry Lines. Five passengers aboard the unit at the time were evacuated safely. Following repairs, the line was reopened on 5 February.

== Fleet details ==
Subclass	Operator	Qty.	Year built	Passenger cars	Unit nos.
755/3	Greater Anglia	14	2018–2020	3	755325–755338
755/4	Greater Anglia	24	2018–2020	4	755401–755424

=== Illustration ===
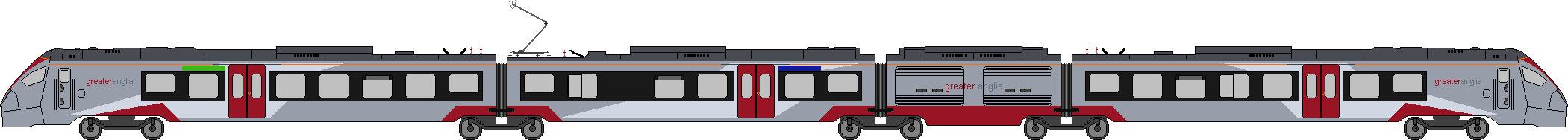
Side-profile illustration of a Class 755/3 unit (based on concept art)
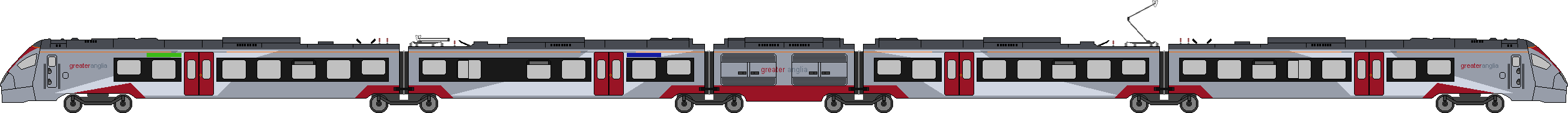
Side-profile illustration of a Class 755/4 unit (based on concept art)

== Special liveries and named units ==
The following units have received names or special liveries:

Unit number	Name	Notes
Named trains
755414	Lest We Forget	Poppy livery
Special liveries
755421		Pride livery

== See also ==
- Class 231 - A diesel multiple unit variant of the Stadler FLIRT UK platform, built for Transport for Wales
- Class 745 - An electric multiple unit variant of the Stadler FLIRT UK platform, also built for Greater Anglia
- Class 756 - A tri-mode multiple unit variant of the Stadler FLIRT UK platform, built for Transport for Wales.
