= Reedham railway station (Norfolk) =

Railway station in Norfolk, England

Coordinates: 52.565°N 1.560°E

Reedham
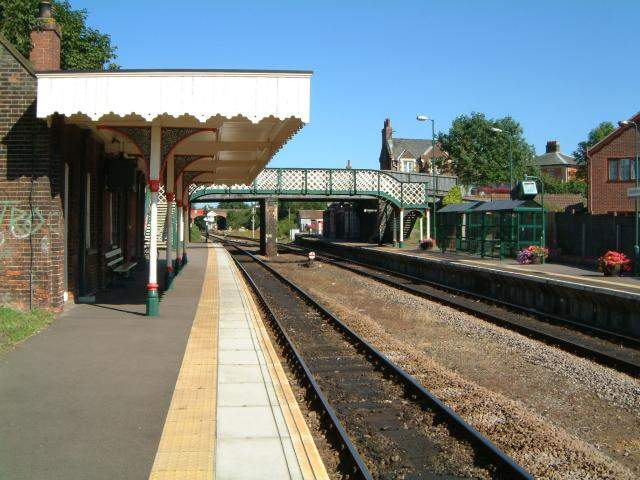
- Reedham railway station in 2001, looking towards Reedham Junction

General information
- Location: Reedham, Broadland, Norfolk; England
- Grid reference: TG413022
- Manager: Greater Anglia
- Platforms: 2

Other information
- Station code: REE
- Classification: DfT category F1

History
- Original company: Yarmouth and Norwich Railway; Eastern Counties Railway
- Pre-grouping: Great Eastern Railway
- Post-grouping: London and North Eastern Railway

Key dates
- 1 May 1844: Opened as Reedham
- 1 June 1904: Replaced by new station c. 300 m west
- 1928: Renamed Reedham (Norfolk)

Passengers
- 2021/22: ▲36,230
- Interchange: ▲690
- 2022/23: ▲37,042
- Interchange: ▲903
- 2023/24: ▲39,320
- Interchange: ▼859
- 2024/25: ▲41,566
- Interchange: ▲890
- 2025/26: ▲46,404
- Interchange: ▲902
Location
Notes
- Passenger statistics from the Office of Rail and Road

Reedham railway station is a stop on the Wherry Lines in the East of England, serving the village of Reedham, Norfolk. It is 12 miles 13 chains (19.6 km) down the line from Norwich; it is situated between Cantley to the west and, to the east, Berney Arms on the branch to Great Yarmouth or Haddiscoe on the branch to Lowestoft. It is commonly suffixed as Reedham (Norfolk) in order to distinguish it from the station of the same name in south London. Its three-letter station code is REE.

The station is currently managed by Greater Anglia, which also operates all trains serving the station. The majority of services run between Norwich and Lowestoft, but three trains per day run to and from Great Yarmouth via the remote Berney Arms station. Services are operated by the brand new Stadler FLIRT Class 755 bi-mode multiple units, which entered service on the Wherry Lines in autumn 2019.

== History ==
The Yarmouth and Norwich Railway Act 1842 (5 & 6 Vict. c. lxxxii) for the Yarmouth and Norwich Railway (Y&NR) received royal assent on 18 June 1842. Work started on the line in April 1843 and the line and its stations were opened on 1 May 1844. Reedham station opened with the line and was, as it is now, situated east of Cantley station and west of Berney Arms station. The Y&NR was the first public railway line in Norfolk. On 30 June 1845 the Norfolk Railway Act 1845 (8 & 9 Vict. c. xli) was passed, authorising the amalgamation of the Y&NR with the Norwich and Brandon Railway came into effect and Reedham station became a Norfolk Railway asset.

The Lowestoft Railway and Harbour Act 1845 (8 & 9 Vict. c. xlv) incorporated the Lowestoft Railway and Harbour Company (LR&HC). In 1846 the LR&HC was leased to the Norfolk Railway (NR) and work started on building a line from Lowestoft, in Suffolk to join the Yarmouth and Norwich line south-east of Reedham. On 1 July 1847 the NR opens the Lowestoft to Reedham line. The station south-east of Reedham on the line to Lowestoft was Haddiscoe.

A couple of months after the Lowestoft line opened, the next station west, Cantley, was closed by the Norfolk Railway.

The Eastern Counties Railway (ECR) and its rival the Eastern Union Railway (EUR) were both sizing up the NR to acquire and expand their railway empire. The ECR trumped the EUR by taking over the NR, including Reedham Station on 8 May 1848.

The ECR reopened Cantley in 1851, once again making it the next station west.

By the 1860s the railways in East Anglia were in financial trouble, and most were leased to the Eastern Counties Railway, which wished to amalgamate formally but could not obtain government agreement for this until the Great Eastern Railway Act 1862 (25 & 26 Vict. c. ccxxiii) was passed on 7 August 1862, when the Great Eastern Railway (GER) was formed by the amalgamation. Actually, Reedham became a GER station on 1 July 1862 when the GER took over the ECR and the EUR before the bill received royal assent.

By the first decade of the last Century the GER started building new stations at Reedham and at Haddiscoe. On 9 May 1904 Haddiscoe Station was closed and replaced by Haddiscoe Low Level on a new site. On 1 June 1904 the GER opened today's Reedham Station and closed the Y&NR station which was 300 metres East of the new station.

The system settled down for the next 17 years, apart from the disruption of the First World War. The difficult economic circumstances that existed after the war led the Government to pass the Railways Act 1921, which led to the creation of the Big Four. The GER amalgamated with several other companies to form the London and North Eastern Railway (LNER). Reedham became a LNER station on 1 January 1923.

In 1928 the LNER renamed Reedham as Reedham (Norfolk) to distinguish it from the Southern Railway) station of Reedham-Surrey.

At nationalisation in 1948, the station and its services were transferred to the Eastern Region of British Railways.

Following the privatisation of British Rail, Railtrack became responsible for infrastructure maintenance in 1994. Following Railtrack's financial problems Network Rail took over operation of the infrastructure in 2002.

The station and its operations came under the Anglia Railways franchise in 1997. Subsequently, National Express East Anglia, then known as One, took over management in 2004.

The station, along with its services, were transferred to Abellio Greater Anglia in 2012.

In October 2018, Network Rail remodelled the Reedham Junction layout and begun the resignalling process, temporarily closing the Berney Arms line to Great Yarmouth. It reopened on 24 February 2020.

== Services ==
The typical daytime off-peak service at Reedham is:

- One train every two hours in each direction between Lowestoft and Norwich, with some additional services during the day
- Two trains per day in each direction between Great Yarmouth and Norwich; there is an additional return service on Saturdays.

On Sundays, there are hourly services to and from Norwich, with eastbound services alternating to Great Yarmouth and Lowestoft.

All trains are operated by Greater Anglia.

Preceding station	National Rail	Following station
Cantley	Greater Anglia; Wherry Lines; Great Yarmouth branch	Berney Arms
Cantley	Greater Anglia; Wherry Lines; Lowestoft branch	Haddiscoe
