= Great Yarmouth railway station =

Railway station in Norfolk, England

Great Yarmouth
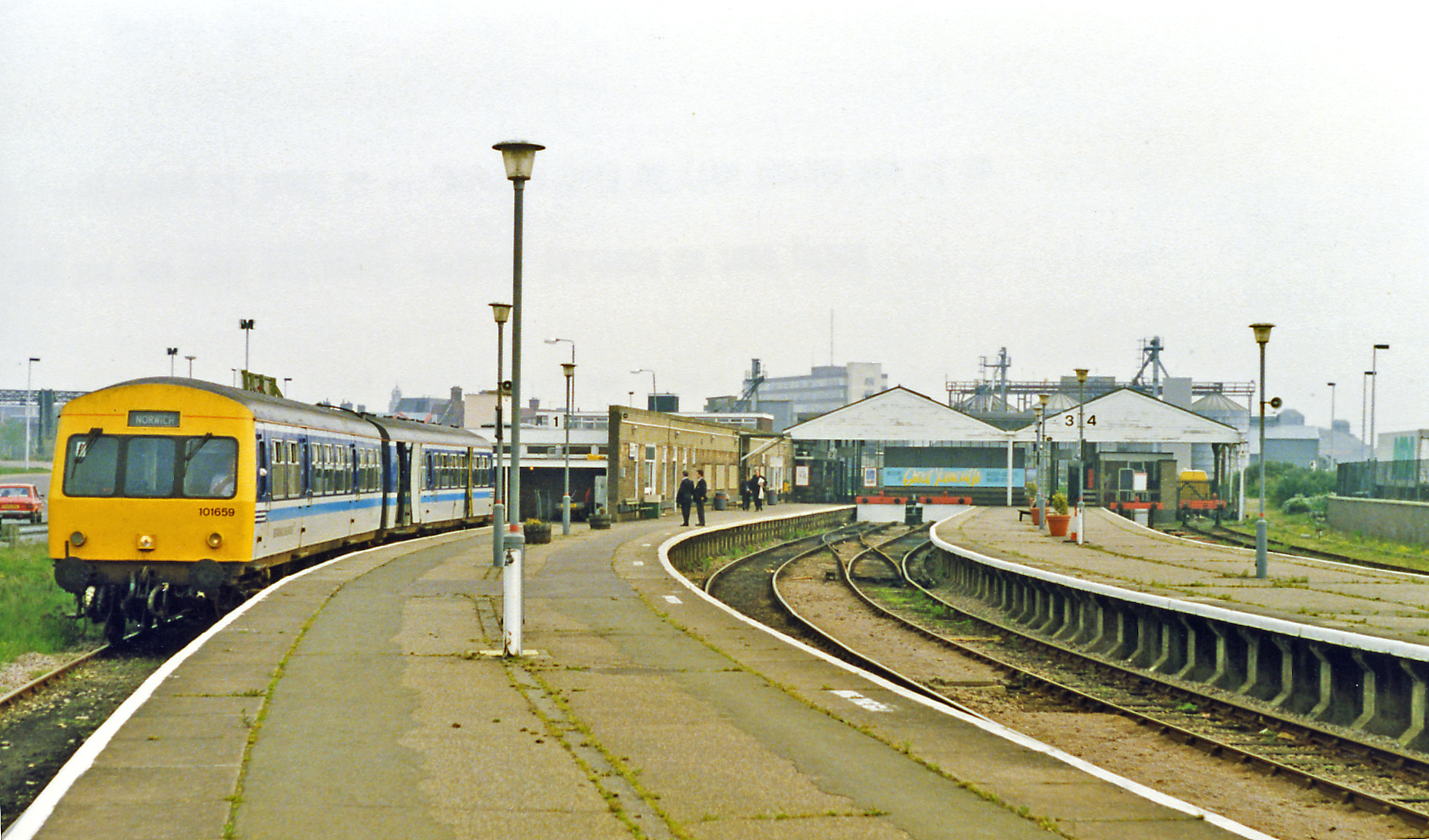
- Great Yarmouth station (1993)

General information
- Location: Great Yarmouth, Borough of Great Yarmouth, England
- Coordinates: 52.6118°N 1.7207°E
- Grid reference: TG519080
- Managed by: Greater Anglia
- Platforms: 3 (numbered 2, 3 and 4)

Other information
- Station code: GYM
- Classification: DfT category C2

History
- Original company: Yarmouth and Norwich Railway
- Pre-grouping: Great Eastern Railway
- Post-grouping: London and North Eastern Railway

Key dates
- 1 May 1844: Opened as Yarmouth Vauxhall
- 16 May 1989: Renamed Great Yarmouth

Passengers
- 2020/21: ▼0.117 million
- 2021/22: ▲0.348 million
- 2022/23: ▲0.393 million
- Interchange: 185
- 2023/24: ▲0.403 million
- Interchange: ▼164
- 2024/25: ▲0.440 million
- Interchange: 164
Location
Notes
- Passenger statistics from the Office of Rail and Road

Great Yarmouth railway station (originally Yarmouth Vauxhall) is one of two eastern termini of the Wherry Lines in the East of England, serving the seaside town of Great Yarmouth, in Norfolk. The other terminus at the eastern end of the lines is Lowestoft and the western terminus, to which all trains run, is Norwich.

Trains from Great Yarmouth run to Norwich via one of two routes: either via Acle, the more regularly used line, or via Reedham. Great Yarmouth is 18 miles 29 chains (29.6 km) down the line from Norwich via Acle and it is 20 miles 45 chains (33.1 km) via Reedham.

The station is managed currently by Greater Anglia, which also operates all of the trains that call.

== History ==
=== Yarmouth Vauxhall ===
The Yarmouth and Norwich Railway Act 1842 (5 & 6 Vict. c. lxxxii) authorising the Yarmouth and Norwich Railway (Y&NR) received royal assent on 18 June 1842. Work started on the line in April 1843; the line and its stations were opened on 1 May 1844. Great Yarmouth station was originally named Yarmouth Vauxhall. The Y&NR line to Norwich through Reedham was the first railway in the county to open.

On 30 June 1845, the Norfolk Railway Act 1845 (8 & 9 Vict. c. xli) authorising the amalgamation of the Yarmouth and Norwich Railway with the Norwich and Brandon Railway came into effect and Yarmouth Vauxhall station became a Norfolk Railway (NR) asset.

The Eastern Counties Railway (ECR) and its rival the Eastern Union Railway (EUR) were both sizing up the NR to acquire and expand their railway empire. The ECR trumped the EUR by taking over the NR, including Yarmouth Vauxhall station on 8 May 1848.

By the 1860s, the railways in East Anglia were in financial trouble; most were leased to the Eastern Counties Railway, which wished to amalgamate formally but could not obtain government agreement for this until the Great Eastern Railway Act 1862 (25 & 26 Vict. c. ccxxiii) was passed on 7 August 1862, when the Great Eastern Railway (GER) was formed by the amalgamation. Actually, Yarmouth Vauxhall became a GER station on 1 July 1862, when the GER took over the ECR and the EUR, before the bill received royal assent.

Two decades into GER ownership, the latter decided to build a shorter route between Yarmouth Vauxhall to Norwich Thorpe. Work started in the early 1880s. The GER started the new line about one mile west of Yarmouth Vauxhall and the junction was named Breydon. The first part of the new line opened on 1 March 1883 as far as the first station at Acle.

The system settled down for the next four decades, apart from the disruption of World War I. The difficult economic circumstances that existed after the war led the government to pass the Railways Act 1921, which led to the creation of the Big Four. The GER amalgamated with several other companies to form the London and North Eastern Railway (LNER). Yarmouth Vauxhall became an LNER station on 1 January 1923.

In May 1943, the station was badly damaged during an air raid. The upper floor of the station building had to be demolished, but train services continued to operate during this period. The remainder of the original station building was demolished and rebuilt in 1960.

On nationalisation in 1948, the station and its services became part of the Eastern Region of British Railways.

Before rail closures of the 1950s and the later Beeching Axe, it was the largest of the three railway stations in the town. The three stations had been linked together since 1882 by the Yarmouth Union Railway. The station is now the sole surviving station in the town.

The station was renamed Great Yarmouth on 16 May 1989. There were large sidings and an engine shed, before they were demolished to make way for an Asda superstore and bypass.

=== Historical services ===
With the closure of Yarmouth Beach station in early 1959, Vauxhall became the focus of the summer Saturday traffic for the town. The station had always had a number of summer Saturday trains up to this point, but this hike in numbers had led to some remodelling of the station layout - platform lengthening and changes to carriage stabling - in order to cope with the additional traffic.

A typical summer Saturday in 1959 saw an additional 24 timetabled passenger trains from locations including York, Derby, Sheffield, Manchester, Leicester and Sunderland. In addition, on 25 July 1959, there were an extra eight holiday relief workings. Some local services were cancelled to cope with this influx of trains, but it indicates the significant numbers of British holidaymakers still travelling by train and holidaying in Great Yarmouth at this time.

=== Privatisation ===
On privatisation, ownership of the station passed to Railtrack; management of the station and its services were transferred to Anglia Railways. In April 2004, National Express East Anglia won the replacement franchise, operating under the brand name One until February 2008. From February 2012, Abellio Greater Anglia took over operating the franchise.

== Other stations in Yarmouth ==
The town was also formerly served by the following stations:

=== Yarmouth Beach ===
Yarmouth Beach was located on Nelson Road and owned by the M&GN, which ran services along the Norfolk coast to Melton Constable and Peterborough. The station closed in 1959 and the site is now a coach station, although plans exist to turn the area into offices.

=== Yarmouth South Town ===
Yarmouth South Town was owned by the Great Eastern Railway, but also served as the terminus for the Norfolk and Suffolk Joint Railway; this ran services through Gorleston-on-Sea and Lowestoft to join with the current East Suffolk Line for a main line service to London. It closed in 1970.

=== Newtown Halt ===
Newtown Halt was located on Salisbury Road and was owned by the M&GN. It opened in 1933 and closed in 1959.

== Services ==
Greater Anglia operates one train each hour between Yarmouth and Norwich, with additional services during the morning and evening peaks. Most services run via Acle, although there are still a number that run via Reedham.

Sunday services tend to be hourly and, up to 16:00, trains alternate between the two routes.

There are proposals to run a wider variety of direct services to London Liverpool Street, Stansted Airport and Peterborough from 2025.

Preceding station	National Rail	Following station
Acle	Greater Anglia; Wherry Lines	Terminus
Berney Arms (via Reedham)	Greater Anglia; Wherry Lines	Terminus

== Carriage sidings ==
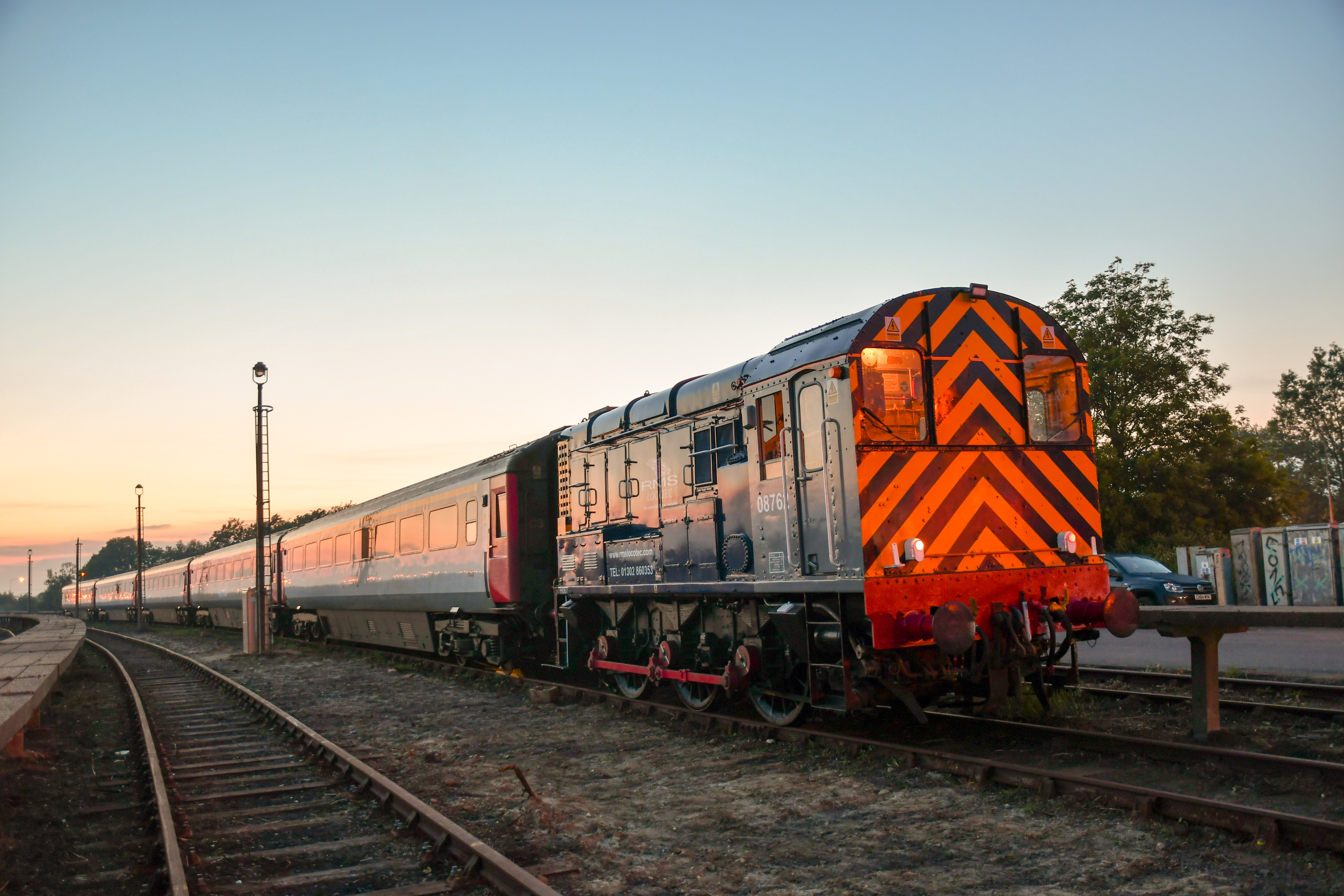
The carriage sidings at Great Yarmouth

New sidings were provided at the western end of the station to cope with the additional services operating into the station, following the closure of the M&GN system. It is a crescent-shaped site between the A47 road and Wherryman's Way at the northernmost point of the River Yare, about 1/4 mi (400 m) north-west of the station. It had fallen out of use in the 1980s when Norwich Crown Point depot was built.

In 2010, the unused sidings were purchased by Great Yarmouth Borough Council; they were intended for use as a freight terminal, despite the lack of rail connection to the town's port. It was hoped that 10,000 tonnes of sugar cane per week would be carried from Yarmouth to Cantley. The need to use a lorry shuttle between the docks and the rail yard, along with a £3.2 million quote for replacing the sidings at Cantley, saw the plan dropped.

In May 2020, Eastern Rail Services commenced a lease with Norfolk County Council and Network Rail for Yarmouth Vauxhall sidings. Managing director James Steward said the siding "matched ERS's requirement for an East Anglian site to base its rolling stock." Following extensive de-vegetation works, Direct Rail Services 37402 became the first locomotive in 19 years to run into the sidings on 26 May 2020, followed the next day by it delivering five former Greater Anglia Mark 3 coaches for storage. On 6 July 2020, ERS was authorised a licence exemption permitting them to operate trains within the site.

Class 08 no. 08762, owned by Eastern Rail Services' sister company RMS Locotec, was delivered by road from Heaton TMD on 16 June 2020 to take up shunting duties on site.

== Recent developments ==
A campaign was launched in 2010 to bring the station up-to-date, called the Fix Great Yarmouth Station campaign. The project attracted around 3,000 pledges of support on-line.

During 2012, Great Yarmouth Community Trust, in partnership with Greater Anglia, provided a welcoming and information service at the station for incoming holidaymakers and tourists. This service was operated as Welcome Host and continued in 2013; it was run on a voluntary basis.

In 2017, signalling and track layout changes saw the lifting of the tracks leading into platform 1, reducing the number of operational platforms at the station to three.

In 2018, it was announced that the station would benefit from £710,000 of investment, redeveloping the entrance and surrounding areas, with the work being funded by the New Anglia Local Enterprise Partnership's Growth Deal. The project was completed in November 2018.

== Gallery ==
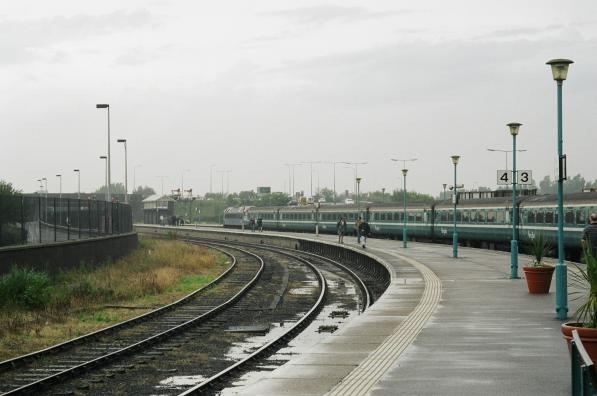
Platforms 3 and 4 at Great Yarmouth

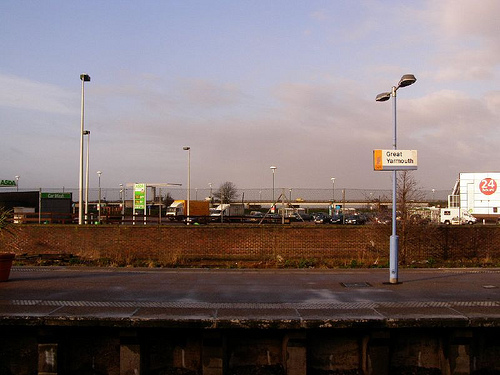
Looking across to Asda where the old rail yards were.

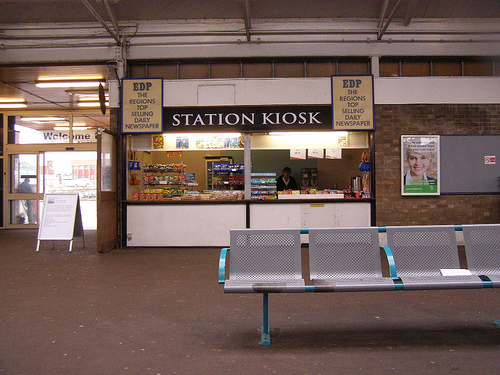
Interior of the station showing the shop and entrance.

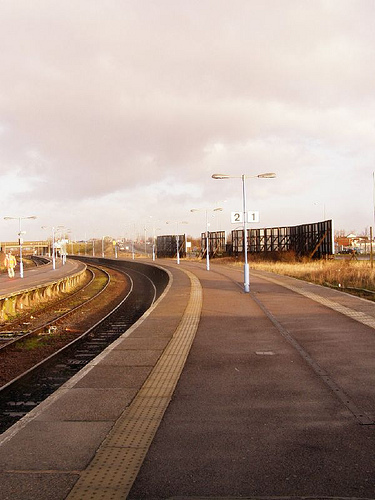
Platforms 1 and 2 facing towards Norwich.
