= History of the East Suffolk line =

English railway history

The East Suffolk line is a railway in East Anglia with a long history.

== Early railways ==
In 1836, the Eastern Counties Railway (ECR) was authorised to construct a line from London to Great Yarmouth, passing through Colchester, Ipswich, and Eye. This 126-mile track was the longest single railway ever authorised at that time. The share capital of £1.6 million was also a record. However, construction proved to be hugely more expensive than had been contemplated, and when the line opened from London as far as Colchester in March 1843, £2.5 million had been expended to build a distance of only 51 miles, and for the time being no further construction was envisaged.

There was considerable disappointment in Ipswich, and for some time it fell to other railway companies to make progress.

In the mid-1840s, there was a sudden surge of railway construction. The Norfolk Railway (NR) reached Norwich through Ely in 1845 and connected Yarmouth, taking a southward route through Reedham. In 1847, the Lowestoft Railway and Harbour Company opened a railway track from Reedham to Lowestoft. However, a large territory between Ipswich and Lowestoft still remained unconnected to the growing railway network.

The Eastern Union Railway (EUR) opened a line from Colchester to Ipswich in 1846. The Ipswich and Bury Railway (I&BR), which was an ally of EUR, was authorised to construct a branch from Ipswich to Woodbridge by the Ipswich and Bury Railway (Woodbridge Extension) Act 1847 (10 & 11 Vict. c. cxxxvii), with a share capital of £200,000. Woodbridge was a port served by sea-going shipping at that time.

The I&BR and EUR were merged in the same year. However, due to the financial difficulties following the Railway Mania, there was a delay in starting the construction. The company needed an extension of time until 1851 to acquire the funds required for the project. This delay caused a lot of dissatisfaction in Woodbridge; in fact, the line would be not opened during the independent existence of the EUR.

Despite its previous failure to complete its first proposal, the ECR considered itself to have primacy in building a railway network in the area and regarded the EUR as an interloper. As a result, it engaged in some dubious obstructionism, creating a hostile relationship.

== East Suffolk Railway ==
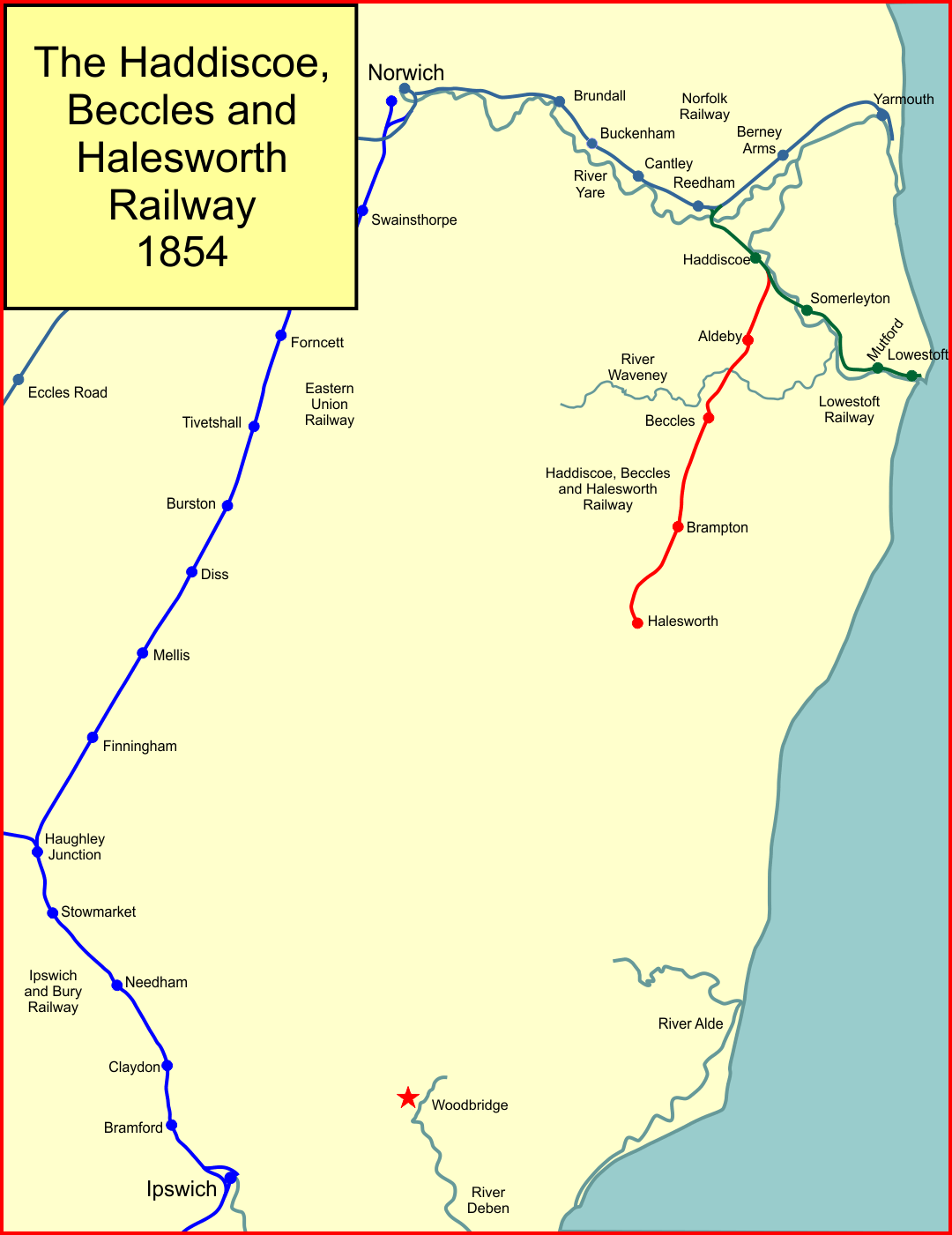
System map of the Haddiscoe, Beccles and Halesworth Railway in 1854

=== Halesworth, Beccles and Haddiscoe Railway ===
Halesworth, Beccles and Haddiscoe Railway Act 1851
- Act of Parliament
- Parliament of the United Kingdom
- Long title: An Act for making a Railway from Halesworth to Beccles and Haddiscoe, with a Branch therefrom, to be called "The Halesworth, Beccles, and Haddiscoe Railway."
- Citation: 14 & 15 Vict. c. xxvi

Dates
- Royal assent: 5 June 1851

Other legislation
- Repealed by: East Suffolk Railway Act 1854

Status: Repealed

Text of statute as originally enacted

By that time, another independent concern proposed a line from the north. This new railway was called the Halesworth, Beccles and Haddiscoe Railway (HB&HR) and was authorised by the Halesworth, Beccles and Haddiscoe Railway Act 1851 (14 & 15 Vict. c. xxvi) on 5 June 1851 with a share capital of £150,000. The route was to run from Haddiscoe, on the Reedham to Lowestoft line, via Beccles, and on to Halesworth, where it was expected to connect to the EUR's Woodbridge branch.

By 1852, however, it was clear that the EUR would not be building its proposed branch soon. The HB&HR also saw the southern termination at Woodbridge to be insufficient, and, in the end, it decided to construct the line for itself. Initially, it planned to run the line through Framlingham, an important local town. However, the Duke of Hamilton objected to this route as it would cross his land and he felt it would diminish his enjoyment of it.

=== Renaming ===
East Suffolk Railway Act 1854
- Act of Parliament
- Parliament of the United Kingdom
- Long title: An Act for making a Railway in Deviation and Extension of the Halesworth, Beccles, and Haddiscoe Railway from Westhall Low Common to Woodbridge, and certain Branches therefrom, and for changing the Name of the Company to the East Suffolk Railway Company.
- Citation: 17 & 18 Vict. c. cxix

Dates
- Royal assent: 3 July 1854

On 3 July 1854, the HB&HR obtained an act of Parliament, the East Suffolk Railway Act 1854 (17 & 18 Vict. c. cxix), to construct an extension, even before its first line was completed. The act authorised the company to change its name to the East Suffolk Railway (ESR) and increased their authorised capital to £450,000 from the previous £150,000 of the HB&HR. The new act also included branch lines leading to Leiston, Snape Bridge, and Framlingham.

Initially, the ECR vigorously opposed the bill, as it believed that it would divert traffic from its network. However, it eventually adopted a more conciliatory approach as it observed that the parliamentary process was moving towards approval.

=== Opening ===
On 14 September 1854, Colonel Yolland carried out inspection for the Board of Trade, which was necessary for passenger operation. However, he found a number of detailed shortcomings and declined permission to open the line for that traffic. With the required improvements made, the ESR eventually opened the line from Haddiscoe to Halesworth for goods on 20 November 1854, and for passengers on 4 December 1854.

The ESR had made arrangements with the NR to work the line, but the ECR had already taken over the NR's workings by the time the line was ready. Hence, the ECR agreed to work the line. The company earned £2,168 in receipts till 30 June 1855, yielding a profit of £528.

The first trains ran from Haddiscoe, on the Norwich to Lowestoft line, to Halesworth. The journey time was 45 minutes, and there were five trains daily, calling at all stations. No trains ran on Sundays.

At this time the ESR offered to sell its line to the ECR, but the offer was turned down by the ECR shareholders at a meeting on 13 July 1855.

=== Temporary closure ===
The ESR had originally been built as a single line, with (at first) purely local aspirations. Now that it was to be a through route to Ipswich, the company made a decision to double the line. It was decided to close the line temporarily to enable the work to take place, and the service was suspended after 15 July 1858, after which a replacement horse-drawn omnibus service was introduced.

== Associated companies ==
By 1855, the towns of Lowestoft and Yarmouth were experiencing difficulties with the circuitous and time-consuming route to London. They therefore decided to build their respective railway line connecting to the ESR line, in order to gain access to what would become a more direct route to London once the ECR connected to the ESR at Woodbridge.

East Suffolk Railway Companies Amalgamation Act 1858
- Act of Parliament
- Parliament of the United Kingdom
- Long title: An Act for the Amalgamation of the Undertakings of the East Suffolk Railway Company, the Yarmouth and Haddiscoe Railway Company, and the Lowestoft and Beccles Railway Company; for leasing the same; and for other Purposes.
- Citation: 21 & 22 Vict. c. cxi

Dates
- Royal assent: 23 July 1858

The two companies were acquired by the East Suffolk Railway by the East Suffolk Railway Companies Amalgamation Act 1858 (21 & 22 Vict. c. cxi).

=== Lowestoft and Beccles Railway ===
Lowestoft and Beccles Railway Act 1856
- Act of Parliament
- Parliament of the United Kingdom
- Long title: An Act for making a Railway from Lowestoft to join the East Suffolk Railway in the Parish of Beccles, all in the County of Suffolk, and for other Purposes connected therewith.
- Citation: 19 & 20 Vict. c. liii

Dates
- Royal assent: 23 June 1856

Text of statute as originally enacted

Traffic from Lowestoft to London had to take a northward route via Norwich, which was a long and expensive detour. In response to the construction of the ESR, business people in Lowestoft considered building a railway line connecting to the ESR at Beccles in the south. They held a meeting on 26 October 1855 and decided to create the Lowestoft and Beccles Railway (L&BR), which was authorised by an act of Parliament, the Lowestoft and Beccles Railway Act 1856 (19 & 20 Vict. c. liii), on 23 June 1856 with an authorised share capital of £80,000. The railway was planned to terminate near St. John's church in South Lowestoft.

East Suffolk Railway (Branch and Capital) Act 1858
- Act of Parliament
- Parliament of the United Kingdom
- Long title: An Act to enable the East Suffolk Railway Company to construct a Branch Railway near Lowestoft; to raise further Sums of Money; and for other Purposes.
- Citation: 21 & 22 Vict. c. xlvii

Dates
- Royal assent: 28 June 1858

Subsequently, the East Suffolk Railway (Branch and Capital) Act 1858 (21 & 22 Vict. c. xlvii) of 28 June 1858 allowed the company to construct a connecting line to the existing Lowestoft (later Central) station by means of building a viaduct over Lake Lothing near Mutford Bridge, which separates the north and south parts of Lowestoft. The authorised extra capital for this was only £10,000, despite including a swing bridge. The line would depart from the Yarmouth main line immediately north of Beccles.

=== Yarmouth and Haddiscoe Railway ===
Yarmouth's traffic to London had to pass through Ely, which was a time-consuming and costly route. In order to improve the transportation system, the business community of Yarmouth held a meeting on 10 November 1855, and determined to build a seven-mile railway line that would connect Yarmouth with the ESR.

Yarmouth and Haddiscoe Railway Act 1856
- Act of Parliament
- Parliament of the United Kingdom
- Long title: An Act for making a Railway from Yarmouth to the East Suffolk Railway in the Parish of Haddiscoe, with a Branch Railway connected therewith, and for other Purposes.
- Citation: 19 & 20 Vict. c. lxxix

Dates
- Royal assent: 7 July 1856

Text of statute as originally enacted

Therefore, the Yarmouth and Haddiscoe Railway (Y&HR) was authorised by the Yarmouth and Haddiscoe Railway Act 1856 (19 & 20 Vict. c. lxxix) on 7 July 1856, and it was designed to connect with the ESR at Haddiscoe, with additional dock branches at Yarmouth.

== Sir Samuel Morton Peto ==
Sir Samuel Morton Peto had business interests in Lowestoft. He believed that the ESR would provide a more direct route from Lowestoft to London, unlike the existing route via Norwich. After the East Suffolk Railway Act 1854, he heavily invested in the ESR's Woodbridge Extension, and eventually became its principal shareholder as well as the line's contractor. His plan was to work the line once it was completed, and in fact, the line was leased to Peto between 1855 and 1861. However, it was never worked by him.

He also had an interest in the aforementioned L&BR and Y&HR, and in 1856 both of these companies accepted Peto's offer to lease their lines.

Peto showed his hand when he proposed a railway from Pitsea to Colchester; the former was on the London, Tilbury and Southend Railway, in which Peto also had an interest. At that point, it was now clear that the plan was to construct a line independent of the ECR from London to Lowestoft and Yarmouth to rival that company. However, nothing came to fruition about this scheme, because the cost would have been extremely expensive.

Nevertheless, Peto controlled or heavily influenced the ESR and both the Lowestoft and Yarmouth companies, and he was instrumental in bringing about the amalgamation of the three lines.

== Full opening ==
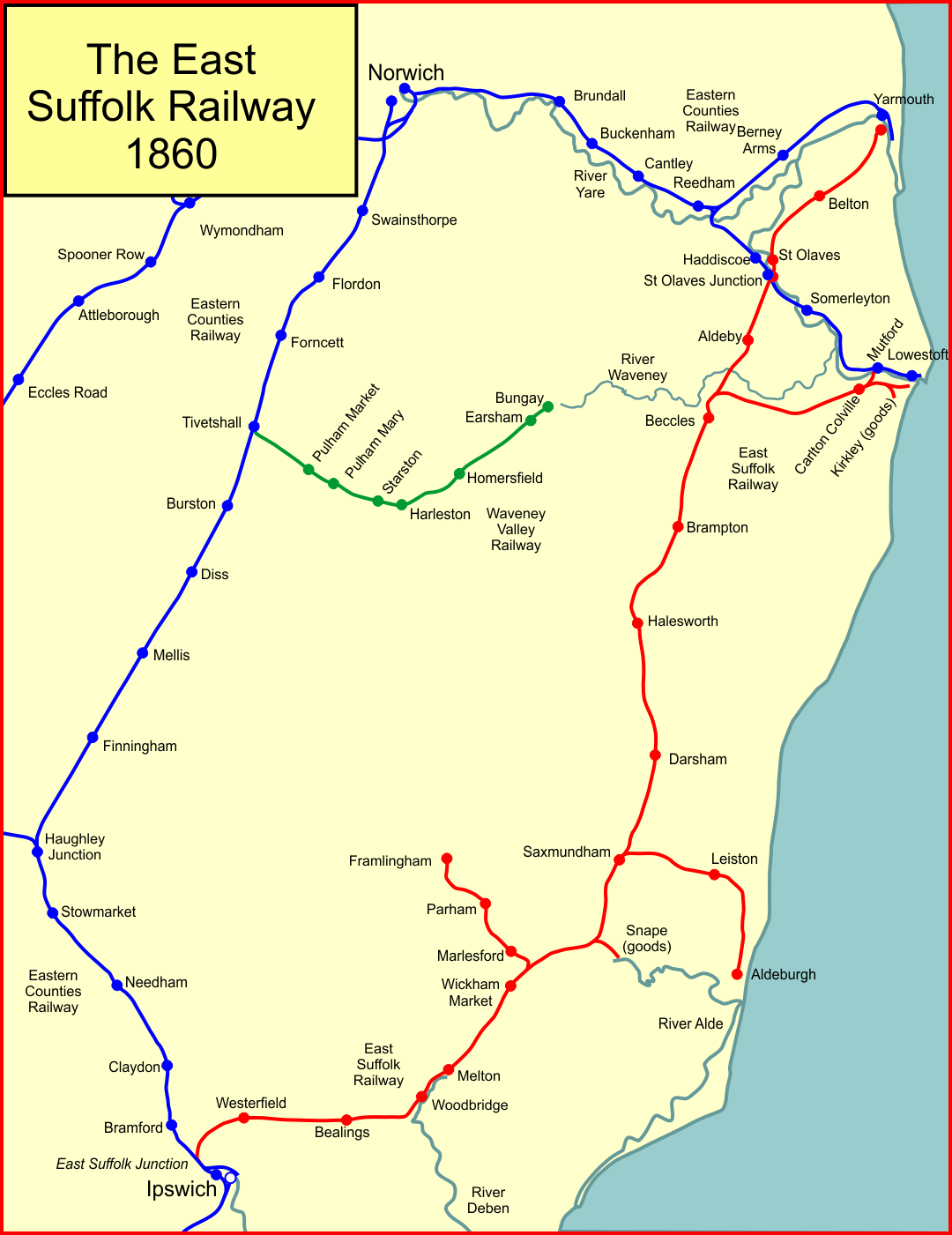
System map of the East Suffolk Railway in 1860

Accordingly, the ESR, the L&BR, and the Y&HR amalgamated on 23 July 1858, using the name of the East Suffolk Railway.

Captain H. W. Tyler of the Board of Trade made the necessary inspection for passenger operation on 7 March 1859. However, there a were several technical shortcomings, and the Board of Trade had received no undertaking as to the method of operation of the line. Moreover, some of the cast iron underbridge beams were not considered adequately strong, so the approval was withheld.

After the inspection, a rather defensive statement had been put out by the company's engineer, George Berkly:

Captain Tyler has to-day seen that the slight alterations he required to be made to some of the signals have been completed. You are aware that these alterations were made nearly two months since, but [we] waited till he was in the neighbourhood inspecting the line from Ipswich to Woodbridge before they could conveniently be seen by Captain Tyler.

The same edition of the newspaper also published disgruntled letters from shareholders complaining about the delay in opening.

Captain Tyler revisited the line to make his second inspection on 5 May 1859, and this time he was satisfied with the technical issues.

Finally on 27 May 1859, the company announced that the entire ESR line would open on 1 June 1859. The company had also indicated that the line would be operated by one engine in steam principle.

The combined network opened on 1 June 1859; together the three railways (ESR, L&BR and Y&HR) had cost £907,401. The main line ran from North of Ipswich, at East Suffolk Junction, and ended at the terminus at Yarmouth later known as Yarmouth South Town. On the same day, three branch lines were also opened: the Framlingham branch, the Snape branch which was only used for goods and led to Newson Garrett's maltings, and the Leiston branch. The ECR was responsible for working these lines. The line was worked by the ECR.

The Ipswich Journal of 4 June 1859 reported on the opening on the official opening day:

Opening of the East Suffolk Railway: Whatever may have been the delays from time to time in completing this line of railway, and from whatever causes they may have arisen, we are glad to state that all difficulties have at length been overcome, and that the whole has been thrown open to the public; and a most excellent line it is. It consists of a main line between Ipswich and Yarmouth (53 miles in length), with branches to Framlingham, Leiston. Snape, and Lowestoft.

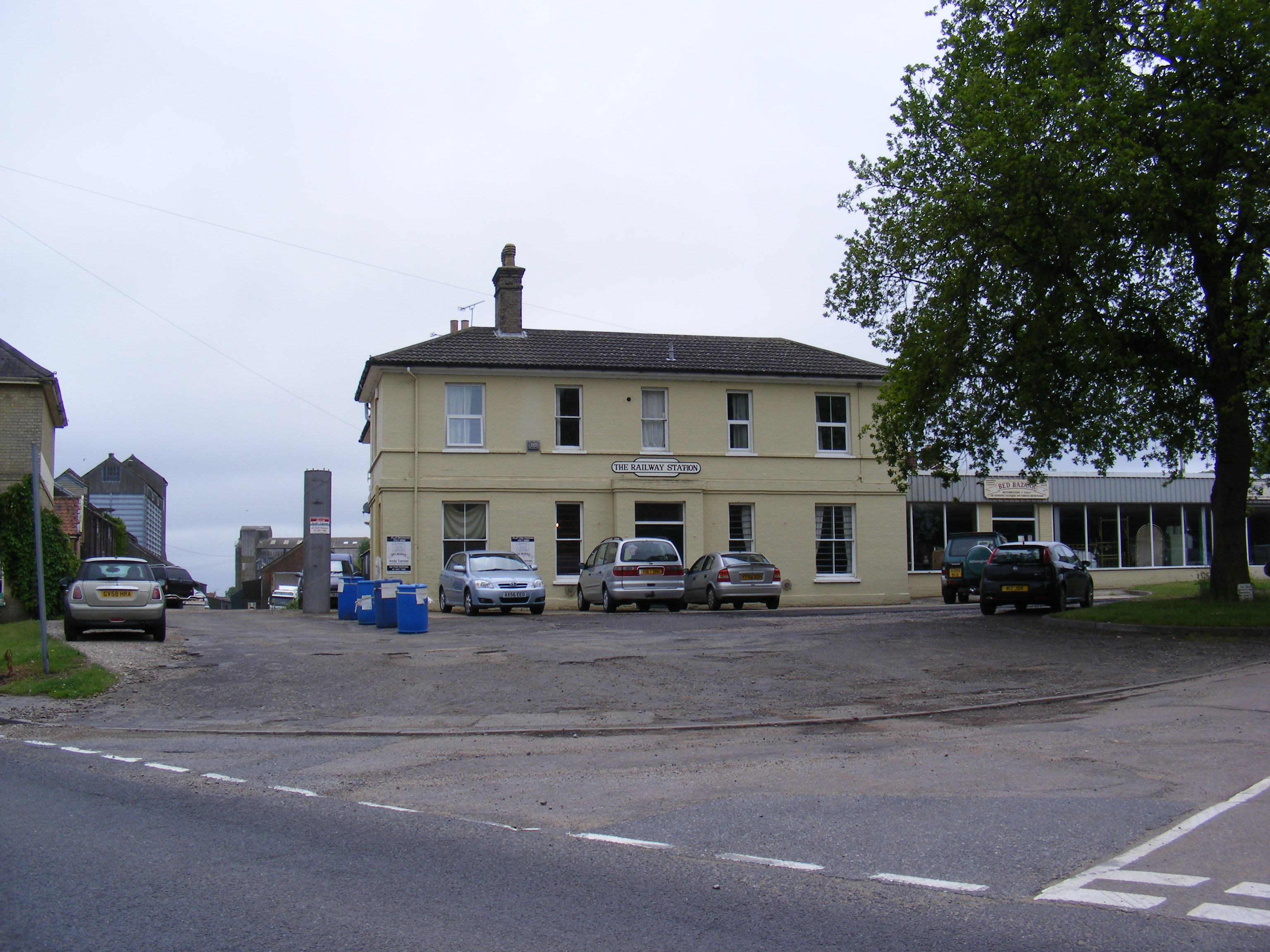
The former railway station building at Framlingham

There was a tragic accident at Framlingham on the opening day: at 1:10 pm a porter of the terminus, Edward Plantin, stepped in front of an arriving train and was badly injured; he died the following day. His duties included the uncoupling of the engine on arrival, and it seems he was too hasty in getting into position. He was a leader of the town band that had been arranged for the celebrations that evening, and these were cancelled as a mark of respect.

At Leiston, a standard gauge tramway extended from the terminus to Richard Garrett's engineering works, which made a considerable output, but it was quickly decided to extend to Aldeburgh (then spelled Aldeborough). The extension was authorised on 19 April 1859; the additional capital for this was £40,000, bringing the ESR's capital to £1.02 million. Captain Tyler carried out the Board of Trade inspection on 6 April 1860, and so the Aldeburgh branch line fully opened on 12 April 1860.

== First train services ==
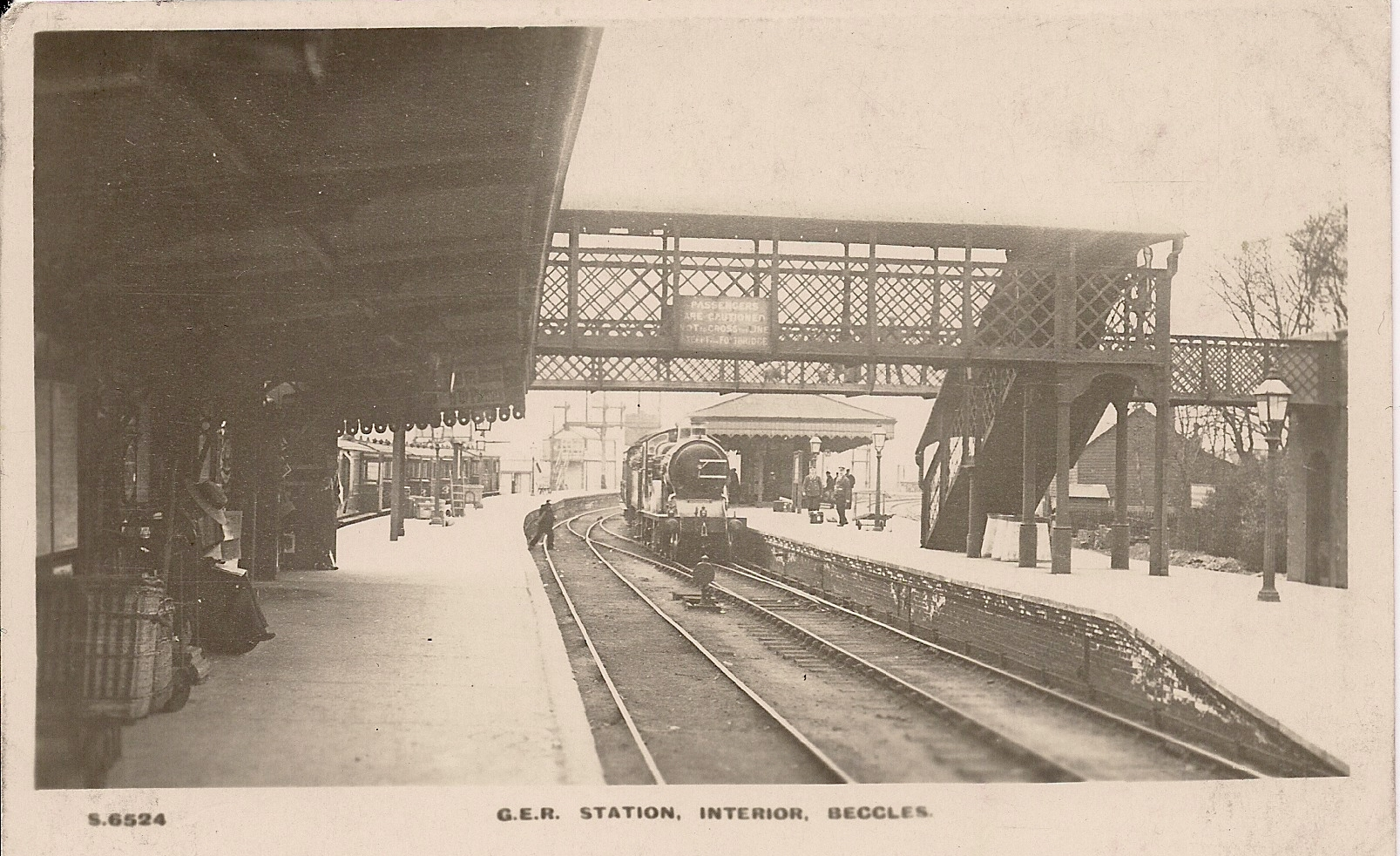
Beccles railway station

On weekdays there were four trains per day from Ipswich. They called at all stations and divided at Beccles with one portion for Great Yarmouth and the other for Lowestoft. In the opposite direction trains combined at Beccles for the onward journey to Ipswich. There were two trains each way on Sundays. The printed timetables somehow showed a station at Snape Junction, which was never exist.

The Snape branch was served by one of the goods trains on the main line.

=== Amalgamated to form the Great Eastern Railway ===
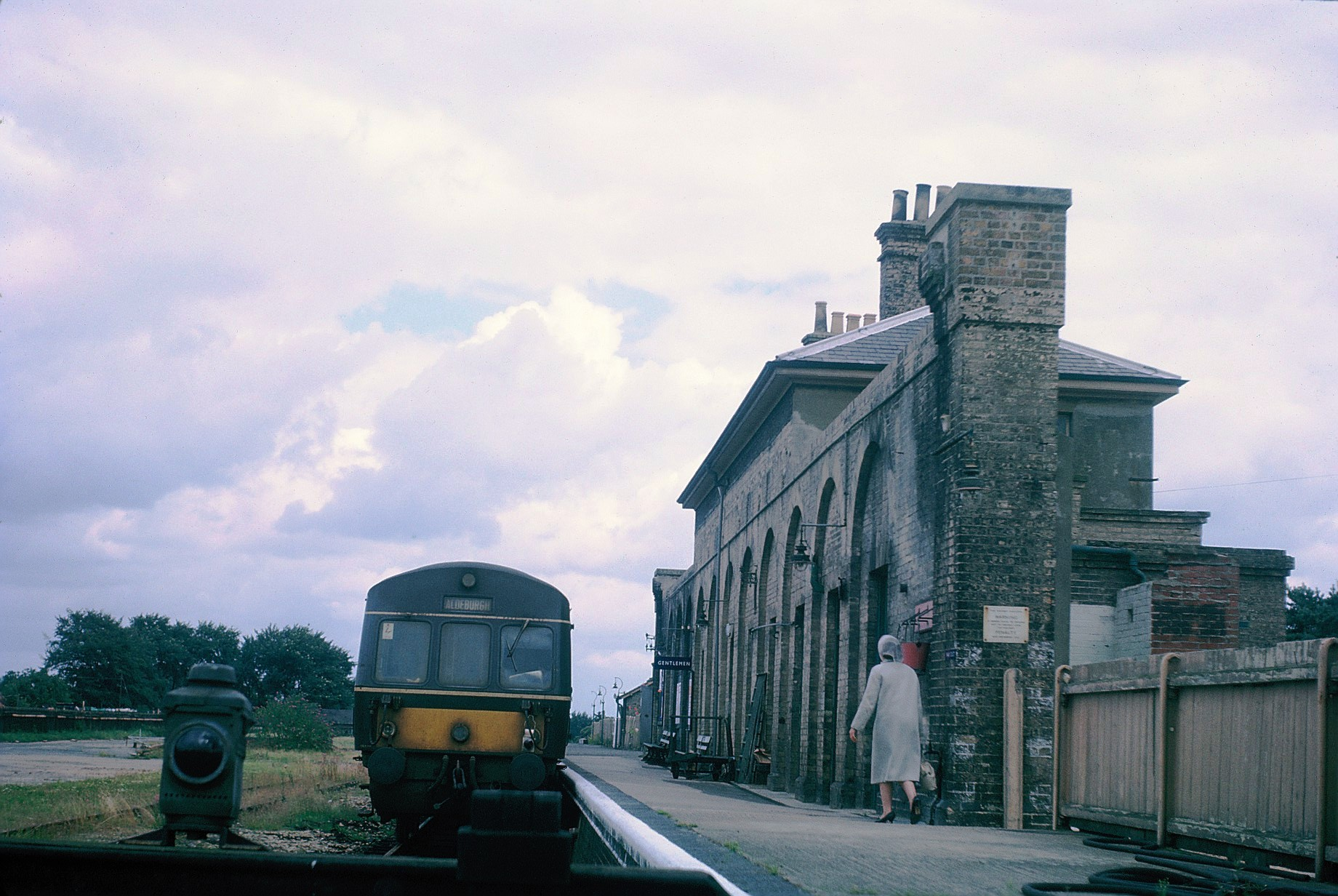
Aldeburgh railway station in 1966

The ECR was gradually taking control of nearly all the railways in the area, and the value of remaining independent, while not actually operating or improving the railway, seemed insignificant. Accordingly, the idea of an amalgamation of all the affected railways met with general approval. This led to an application to Parliament in 1862 to authorise the creation of a new company, the Great Eastern Railway (GER), which would take over the independent concerns. The proposal gained royal assent on 7 August 1862, effective from July 1862.

The ESR shareholders got £340,000 in GER 4% debentures and 3335,000 in 4.5% preference shares.

== Waveney Valley Railway ==
The Waveney Valley Railway had been authorised in 1851 to build from Tivetshall on the EUR main line between Ipswich and Norwich, to Bungay. In 1853 it was granted authority to extend eastwards to Beccles, and at the time it appeared that this would be a further useful outlet for the traffic of the ESR. However the Waveney Valley company took some time to complete the line: it was not until 2 March 1863 that Beccles was reached, and by that time it was under the ownership of the GER.

== Train services in the period 1862–1900 ==
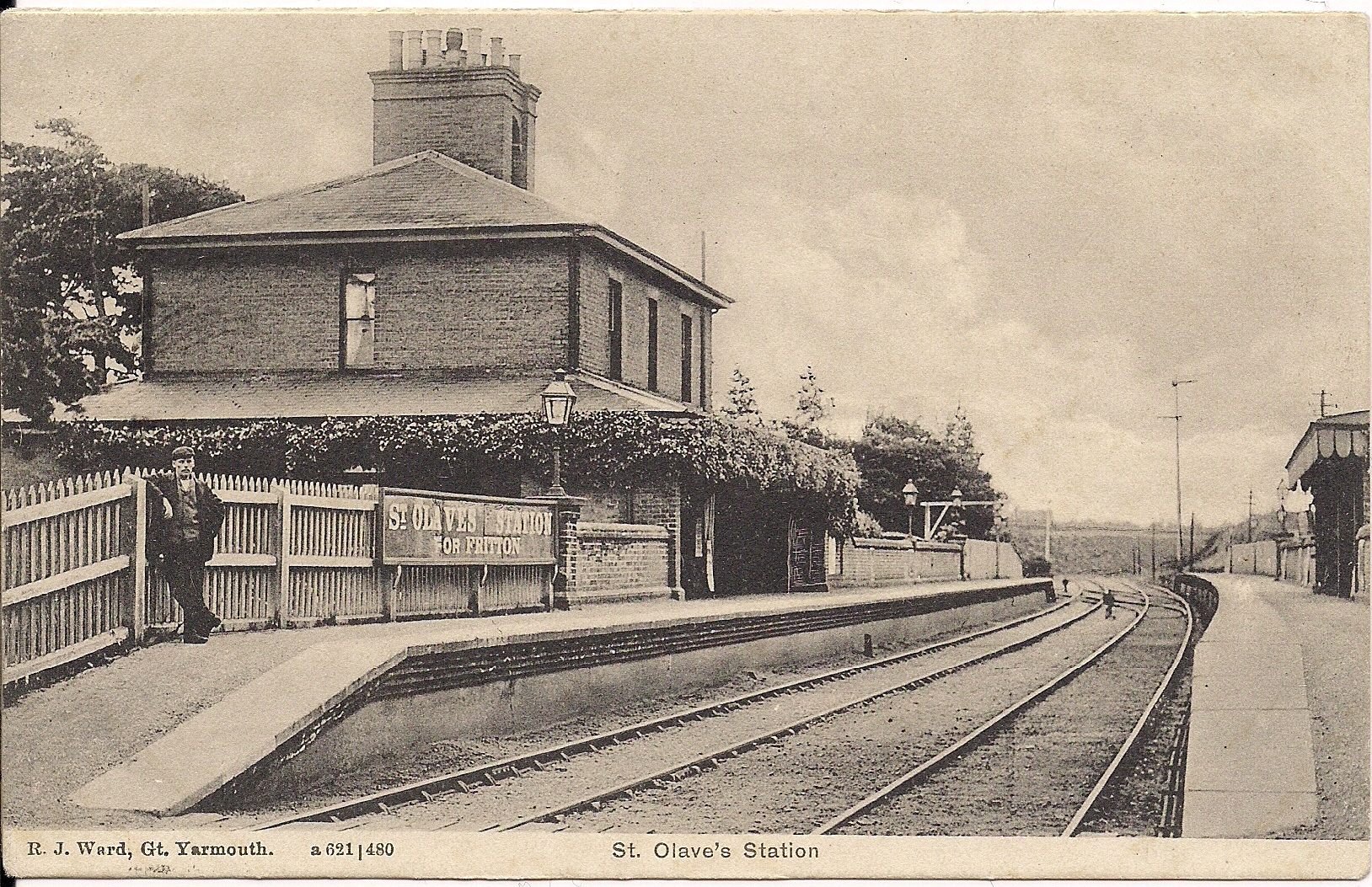
St Olaves Railway Station

In its first year of operation, the GER operated a through train to London (Bishopsgate station was the London terminal at the time) calling at all stations to Ipswich, then Manningtree, Colchester, Marks Tey, Witham, Chelmsford, and Stratford. The following year a 10:00 service from Bishopsgate would get passengers to Lowestoft in 3 hours 15 minutes and Great Yarmouth in 3 hours 25 minutes. After Ipswich, the only call was at Beccles where the train was divided into two sections to serve the two destinations.

Considering the greater resources of the GER, local people requested the installation of a passenger service to Snape. The company considered the potential but reckoned with the necessity to provide a dedicated service (as it was at the end of the line) and it considered that there was no possibility of such a service being affordable. Local people revived the proposal in 1864, even suggesting mixed trains as an alternative to dedicated passenger trains, but this was nevertheless uneconomic and the proposal was again refused.

By 1883 stopping services had increased to eight per day (dividing and joining at Beccles), and there were two or three services from Liverpool Street.

In the 1890s there was a considerable development of seasonal holiday traffic to Aldeburgh.

=== Felixstowe branch ===
The Felixstowe Railway and Dock Company was launched, after a number of false starts, to connect Felixstowe to the railway network, and to develop a harbour at Felixstowe. It opened to passenger traffic on 1 May 1877, and to goods in June 1877. It made a junction with the East Suffolk line at Westerfield. Felixstowe developed steadily over the years as a shipping port, and also as a seaside resort, and the traffic to and from it placed a strain on the East Suffolk line over the shared section.

Containerisation from about 1967 encouraged a huge development, and at the present day the Port of Felixstowe is a massive container port, bringing considerable traffic to the railway.

=== Southwold Railway ===
Local people had hoped that the ESR would build a branch line to Southwold, but that was refused. Eventually subscriptions were raised locally to build a branch line independently, and after some deliberation the track gauge of 3 feet was chosen in the interest of economy. The line opened in 1879, and both passenger and goods traffic was operated. The non-standard gauge meant that goods had to be transshipped at Halesworth, and in time this was considered to be a limitation. Declining business resulted in the line closing on 11 April 1929.

=== Haddiscoe and St Olaves ===
When the first section of the ESR opened, it was initially a branch running southwards that linked at Haddiscoe to the Lowestoft Railway and Harbour Company's line, which ran from Reedham to Lowestoft. After the line reopened in 1859, the junction was reconfigured, and the primary route ran from north to south from Yarmouth, crossing over the Lowestoft Railway. The two routes remained connected between Fleet Junction and Haddiscoe Yard.

St Olaves station was situated some distance north of the point of intersection, and there were two stations named St Olaves Junction at the intersection, "High Level" on the ESR and "Low Level" on the Lowestoft Railway. These were only exchange platforms and had no access from the public road.

From April 1872 (Brodribb) / 1 June 1872 (Paye), a new east-to-north single-track curve, 31 chains long, was established between Marsh Junction and St Olaves Swing Bridge Junction. This allowed the commencement of a passenger service from Lowestoft to Yarmouth. From 13 July 1903, this service was only available during the summer months. The curve was ultimately closed on 8 September 1954.

In June 1900, the track over the St Olaves swing bridge was modified to become a conventional single track, instead of being gauntleted.

In 1903, the Norfolk and Suffolk Joint Railway was opened, providing a much shorter transit between Lowestoft and Yarmouth.

Subsequently, in 1904, a lot of work was carried out between Reedham and Lowestoft, resulting in the doubling of the line from Reedham to Marsh Junction. To clarify, Brodribb adds:

"Meantime a new Haddiscoe station was built 700 yd on the Lowestoft side of the old, replacing the former St Olaves Junction or Herringfleet Low Level Exchange Platform, and allowing the original Haddiscoe station to close. The High Level Exchange platforms on the East Suffolk were also renamed Haddiscoe and the station opened for the public to start and finish their journeys, on 9 May 1904. New signalboxes were provided at Haddiscoe Yard, Haddiscoe Junction, Reedham Swing Bridge and Reedham station."

=== Twentieth century ===
With the development of seaside holidays, a new halt, Thorpeness Halt, was opened on the Aldeburgh branch on 29 July 1914 to serve the nearby Thorpeness Holiday Village. However, the onset of World War I severely limited the development of Thorpeness as a holiday destination.

Full signalling had been provided at Snape from the outset. However, the GER decided that this was unnecessary for the terminus of a short goods-only branch, and on 23 December 1907 the signalling was removed.

== From 1923 ==
The Railways Act 1921 was passed by the government, with the objective of reorganising most of the railways of Great Britain into one or other of four main groups. The Great Eastern Railway was a constituent of the new London and North Eastern Railway (LNER). This was effective from the beginning of 1923.

From June 1924, the LNER ran a passenger service named the Eastern Belle. The train was formed of Pullman cars and ran to different seaside resorts in East Anglia on successive days of the week; it was an out and back in a day service. Aldeburgh was the receiving destination of one of the services, with the journey time from London being 2 hours 50 minutes. Handling a heavy train on the Aldeburgh branch was a challenge for the engine crew, with no turning facilities available at Aldeburgh. In 1933, the timing was accelerated to 2 hours 15 minutes. The service was suspended on the outbreak of war in 1939.

In 1933, a siding was laid on the site of the former Southwold Railway terminus to serve the United Dairies plant at Halesworth. Milk tanks ran from Halesworth to Ilford (London) on a daily basis. The dairy closed on 30 April 1968 although rail traffic may have ceased before that date.

After the start of World War II, an emergency timetable was introduced and only eight trains a day from Ipswich to Great Yarmouth operated daily, with two on Sundays. Saxmundham acted as a railhead for 6,000 evacuees from London in the early days of the war, although with the threat of invasion in 1940 they were moved away. Because of the line's proximity to the East Anglian coast, a number of armoured trains operated until 1943, when they were stood down as the threat of invasion had receded.

== From 1948 ==
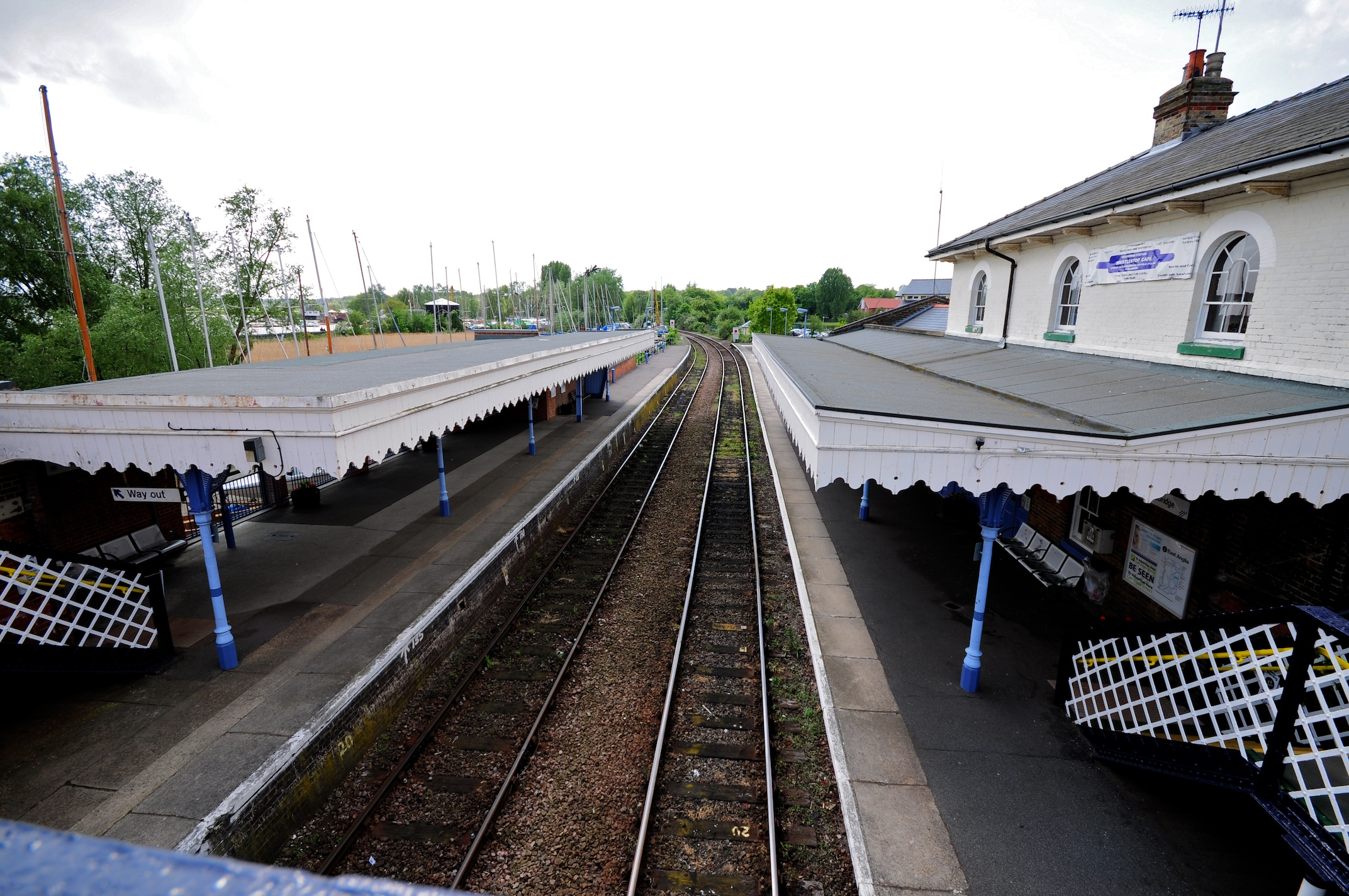
Woodbridge station in 2006

In 1947 the government once again determined to reorganise the railways compulsorily. This time, under the Transport Act 1947, the Big Four companies were nationalised to become British Railways (BR). The former LNER network became part of BR's Eastern Region, which included the East Suffolk network.

The Framlingham branch had long suffered from falling patronage, and it was closed to ordinary passenger traffic on 3 November 1952. For some years Framlingham College special trains and also ramblers' excursions ran on the branch; the last passenger train to use the branch would be the latter. This ran on 12 April 1963 from London Liverpool Street to Framlingham and was believed to be the only time a diesel locomotive, on this occasion Class 31 No. D5595, worked a passenger train on the branch. Heavy grain loadings at Framlingham secured the future of the goods service for the time being, but on 19 April 1965, the branch closed completely.

The North Sea flood of 1953 on 31 January 1953 brought about track damage at Woodbridge, where the embankment was in danger of slipping, and at Melton, where the embankment was washed away.

The passenger service on the Waveney Valley line was withdrawn on 5 January 1953.

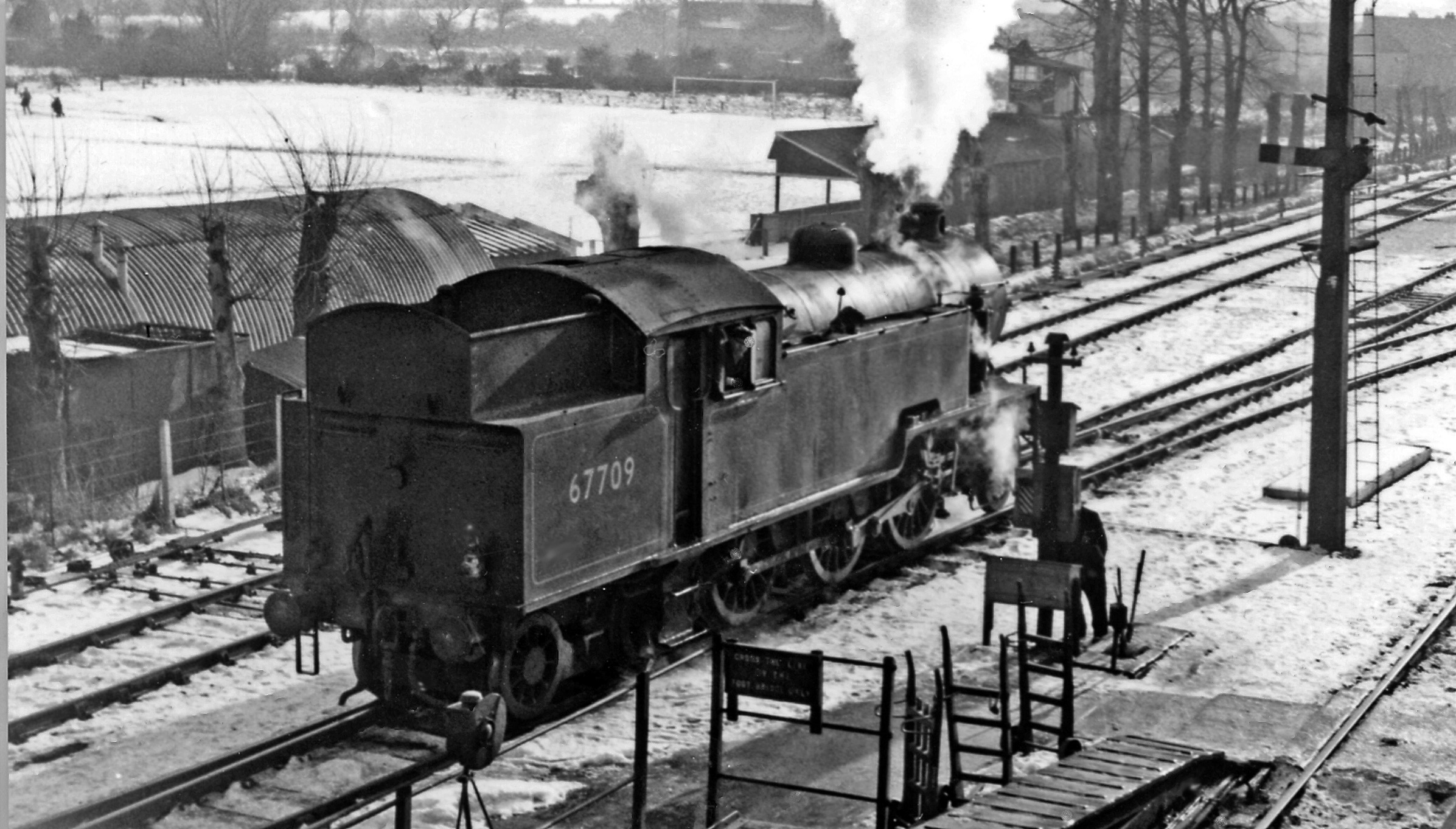
An L1 2-6-4T in a wintry scene at Beccles Station about to work the Lowestoft portion of an express train from London Liverpool Street

In 1954 there was a general acceleration of the best trains between London and Yarmouth, at 2 hours 58 minutes for 121 miles, running semi-fast from Ipswich. Additional local services were provided between Beccles and Lowestoft/Yarmouth, operated by push-and-pull trains. About 25 trains ran between Ipswich and Beccles each way on summer Saturdays, many of them non-stop over that stretch. The Holiday Camps Express ran non-stop between London and Lowestoft; in the up direction the Lowestoft stop was for engine change only.

BR closed Melton in 1955 and Bealings in 1956 due to insufficient patronage.

From 10 November 1956, diesel multiple units were introduced on the East Suffolk line. The new diesel trains were popular, but the line was limited in its appeal because of the inconvenient location of many of the stations.

In January 1959, timetable arranged that express services on the route ran every three hours between Yarmouth (South Town) and Ipswich; they were supplemented by an hourly diesel multiple unit service, which generally ran via Gorleston and Lowestoft (reverse) to Beccles, then calling at Halesworth, Saxmundham and Woodbridge only. Minor stations were served by occasional all stations services.

On 2 November 1959, the line between Beccles and Yarmouth South Town was closed.

In the 1950s, the maltings at Snape had become outdated and were losing in competition with more modern companies. Imported barley was being brought in by road and by coastal shipping, although there was some sugar beet traffic in season. Timber bridges on the branch needed replacement and modernisation required replacement of the J15 steam locomotives with diesel locomotives. However, the main line diesels were considered to be too heavy for the line's bridges, while the light diesel shunters were seen as impracticable in view of their slow maximum speed in reaching the location from Ipswich.

== From 1960 ==
In 1960, it was announced that a new nuclear power station would be constructed at Sizewell, near Leiston; there would be a considerable volume of construction materials, and much of these would be delivered by rail.

The last train operated on the Snape branch on 4 March 1960, and it was officially closed on 7 March; the line had been served by the last regular main line steam working in Suffolk.

Yarmouth expresses diverted via Norwich from 18 June 1962.

The entire East Suffolk line was listed for closure as part of the Beeching Plan of 1963. There was considerable local opposition, and on 29 June 1966 the Minister of Transport, Barbara Castle, announced that the East Suffolk main line would be retained, although the Aldeburgh line could close.

The goods yards at Westerfield, Bealings, Wickham Market, Brampton and Oulton Broad South were all closed on 13 July 1964. The Kirkly goods stations and Lowestoft south side were also closed in 1966 and 1967 respectively.

The through local service Ipswich to Yarmouth via Beccles ended in November 1966.

The Aldeburgh branch was closed to passenger traffic on 12 September 1966.

It was essential to reduce the cost of operating the line to the minimum, and this was to be done by singling the track, introducing conductor-guard operation (later named the "paytrain" system) and destaffing the stations. A revised train service was implemented on 11 November 1966, and conductor-guard operation from 10 March 1967.

Paytrains were introduced on 7 March 1967.

The Lowestoft to Yarmouth line closed on 4 May 1970.

In 1972, the layout of Saxmundham junction was simplified and the junction signal box was taken out of service.

On 26 October 1981, atomic flask traffic started running to and from the nuclear power station at Sizewell.

The East Suffolk line was resignalled in 1984 using the Radio Electronic Token Block, with the controlling box located at Saxmundham. This resulted in the closure of all conventional signal boxes along the line. Melton station was also reopened in that year after a local campaign.

In 1988, the layout at Sizewell was extended so as to handle construction traffic for Sizewell B power station.

== From 2000 ==
In December 2010, through trains from Lowestoft to London via the East Suffolk Line were terminated.

Until October 2012, the section from Westerfield to Oulton Broad was signalled using Radio Electronic Token Block controlled from Saxmundham, and was the only line in England to use this system. However, due to radio frequency licensing issues and the imminent beginning of an hourly train service on the line, which would have been beyond the capacity of RETB, Track Circuit Block signalling (using AzLM axle counters) has replaced the former, after the last such working on 19 October 2012. The new signalling came into operation on 23 October 2012, controlled from the existing signal box at Saxmundham. On 10 December 2012, a new passing loop and reinstated second platform opened at Beccles, and an hourly service over the East Suffolk line was introduced.

== Motive power ==
During the steam era the only engine sheds located on the line were at Beccles and Lowestoft. Locomotives from Yarmouth South Town, Norwich and Ipswich engine sheds all worked services over the line and some express services would have been worked by locomotives from Stratford engine shed. Branch line terminus such as Framlingham and Aldeburgh had accompanying engine sheds for the branch locomotives.

During the steam era the majority of services would have been worked by locomotives of the GER origin. These would have included:

Class (LNER classification)	Wheel arrangement	Usual traffic
B12	4-6-0	Express passenger
D13	4-4-0	Passenger
D14	4-4-0	Passenger
D15	4-4-0	Passenger
E4	2-4-0	Passenger
F3	2-4-2T	Branch line
F4	2-4-2T	Branch line
F5	2-4-2T	Branch line
J14	0-6-0	Goods
J15	0-6-0	Goods

In 1928, the LNER introduced the B17 class 4-6-0 locomotives on express workings.

After 1948, the LNER introduced the Thompson Class L1 2-6-4 tank locomotives (this was an LNER design built under British Railway's auspices). From 1951 the Britannia Class 4-6-2 locomotives worked express workings.

From the late 1950s diesel locomotives started appearing on services. These included:

- British Rail Class 03 - shunting/local goods
- British Rail Class 04 - shunting/local goods
- British Rail Class 05 - shunting/local goods
- British Rail Class 15 - mixed traffic
- British Rail Class 21- mixed traffic
- British Rail Class 24- mixed traffic
- British Rail Class 31- mixed traffic
- British Rail Class 37- predominantly passenger traffic - worked through trains to London Liverpool Street until 1984.

Diesel Multiple Units took over all local stopping services on 5 January 1959 and the last steam locomotives used the line in June 1960. Several classes of DMU have worked the line including Gloucester RCW Class 100, Cravens Class 105 and for many years in the 1980s and 1990s Metropolitan Cammel Class 101 based at Norwich depot. The latter operated as a small dedicated fleet equipped with radio signalling equipment. An experimental railbus, LEV1, was employed on the East Suffolk for two months in 1980. Eventually more modern types of DMU operated the line with Class 150s and from 2019 Class 755s running East Suffolk line services.
