= Leiston Works Railway =

Railway line in Suffolk, England

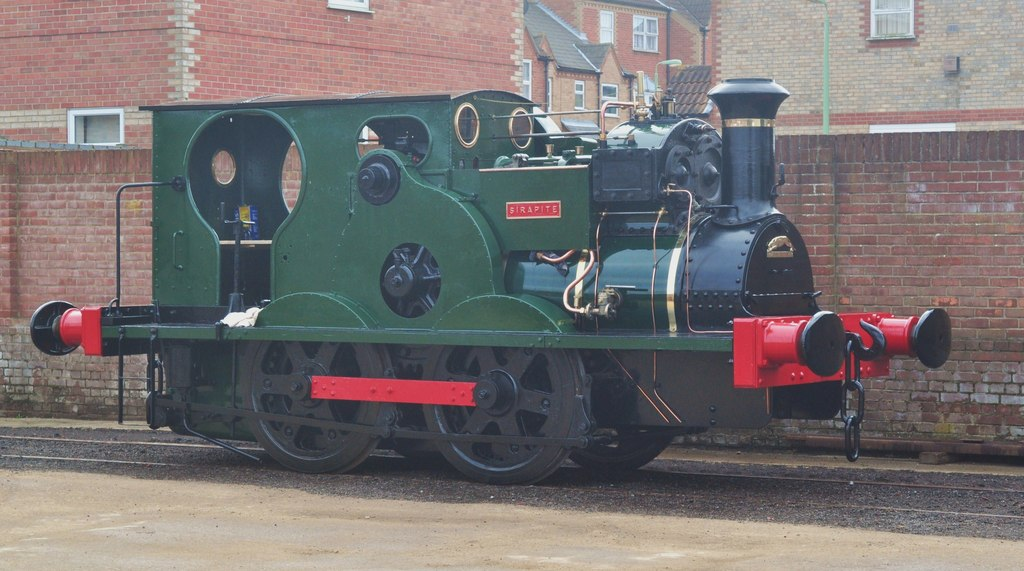
- Sirapite the works shunter

Commercial operations
- Built by: Aveling and Porter Ltd
- Original gauge: 4 ft 8 1/2 in (1,435 mm)

Preserved operations
- Preserved gauge: 4 ft 8 1/2 in (1,435 mm)

Commercial history
- Closed: 1968

Preservation history
- Headquarters: Long Shop Museum in Leiston

The Leiston Works Railway was a private railway that ran from Leiston railway station on the Aldeburgh Branch Line of the Great Eastern Railway to the engineering works of Richard Garrett & Sons. The railway was originally operated by Suffolk Punch horses hauling coal and iron from the main line to the Garrett Works. This was later taken over by steam shunting engine Sirapite which was then replaced by a battery electric engine in 1962.

The line closed in 1968, with the battery locomotive being scrapped.

== Restoration ==
After closure of the works, part of the complex was preserved as the Long Shop Museum, while Sirapite survived, unrestored, in the private collection of Sir William McAlpine. The locomotive has since been returned to Leiston and restored to operational condition.

A group has been formed with the intention of restoring the 250-yard (229 m) stretch of track running behind the Engineers Arms public house to the entrance of the Master Lord Industrial Estate, close to the former junction with the main line. The group paid £17,000 for the trackbed and hope that original locomotive Sirapite, which has recently been restored, will be operated on the restored route periodically. In January 2013 the group took delivery of eighteen 60-foot (18 m) track panels to use in relaying the route.

The formal reopening of the railway in time for its 160th anniversary was on 1 June 2019. A visiting locomotive, Ruston 48DS No.294266, the first diesel to ever transverse the line, and fittingly once owned by Sir William McAlpine himself, had the honour of reopening the line. The loco is based at the nearby Mid Suffolk Light Railway, keeping a local connection and setting up a relationship between the two railways.

== Sirapite the works shunter ==
Sirapite is the name of the shunting locomotive at the Leiston Works Railway.

It was built as a shunting engine by Aveling and Porter in 1906 and sold to Gypsum Mines Ltd for £985. The locomotive's name came from their plaster of Paris product which they had considered calling 'PARISite' before adopting the more pleasant-sounding 'SIRAPite'.

In 1929, Sirapite was sold to Garrett & Sons. It was used to perform the task of moving trucks between Garrett's two sites – the Long Shop, and the 'Top Works' which is now an industrial park near the disused station. It would also collect and deliver goods left in the exchange sidings adjacent to Leiston railway station which had been previously carried out by horses. During the movement of goods around the engine became a source of pride for the local area.

A battery locomotive replaced Sirapite in 1962, and the steam locomotive was purchased by Sir William McAlpine, a well-known railway item collector – known primarily for owning Flying Scotsman and Pendennis Castle, two very famous steam locomotives from British railway history. However, Sirapite did not see the same "glitz and glamour" which it saw in Leiston – the locomotive ended up rusting away in Kent during its first years of preservation.

Grants from both public and private funders saw Sirapite being returned to Leiston and she was eventually restored to full working order.

Sirapite arrived at the Mid Suffolk Light Railway on 26 April 2019. The engine was there for the Summer season of 2019 for the railway. However, due to not being fitted with vacuum braking (as it was built as a goods engine and not a locomotive for passenger services), it could not haul passenger trains. The engine arrived at the railway so it could remain on display whilst the Long shop redeveloped part of its site. The outing to the "Middy" was the first time that the engine had more space to run on which was more than a few yards on the short demonstration line at the Long Shop Museum.
