= Snape branch line =

Railway branch line in Suffolk, England

The Snape branch line was a railway branch line located in Suffolk which served Snape Maltings. It ran from Snape Junction on the East Suffolk line and was 1¼ miles long. The line was opened in 1859 and throughout its life was operated as a freight-only line. The line was closed 101 years later in 1960.

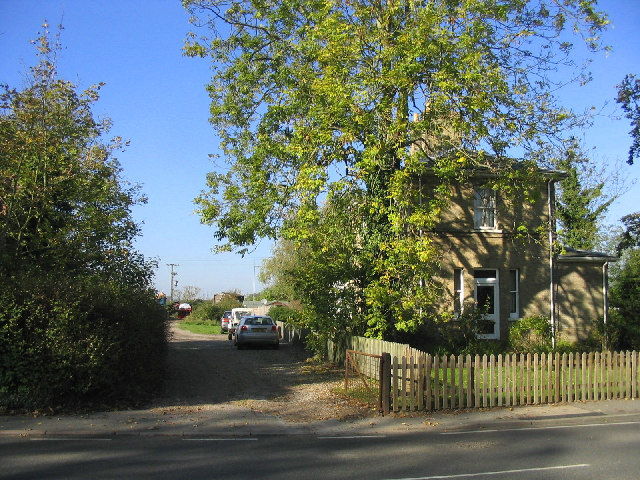
Site of the goods yard

== Opening ==
The line was opened in June 1859 at the same time as the East Suffolk line, Framlingham branch line and Aldeburgh branch line (as far as Leiston). The supporters of the scheme proposed the branch to Snape Bridge in order to secure the support of the owner of Snape Maltings, Newson Garrett, and as a way of securing malted barley traffic for the burgeoning brewery trade in London.

The line was built by the East Suffolk Railway, but on opening was taken over and operated by the Eastern Counties Railway.

A passenger station at Snape Junction on the East Suffolk Junction was proposed and indeed appeared in public timetables for some years during the 1860s. It was never built, although a road leading to the site was. Although no passenger trains ever operated on the branch, a building still known as 'Station House' was constructed, and there have been references to the site as 'Tunstall Station'.

== History ==
In 1862 the Eastern Counties Railway became part of the Great Eastern Railway (GER).

Between 1862 and 1868 there was a dispute (between Newson Garrett and the GER) over exactly who owned what on the site. The GER threatened to withdraw the train service and the dispute lingered on until 1878.

In 1893 Newson Garrett died.

In February 1900 the line was blocked by snowdrifts for three days.

In 1908 the GER wrote to the Board of Trade and advised that the line would never carry passengers. This meant the branch could operate on a one engine in steam principle and no signals would be required at Snape. This enabled the ever careful GER to make operational savings with the only signalling be approaching the junction (and controlled by the signal box there).

In both 1910 and 1912 the line was closed for short periods due to flooding.

During 1917 the line was closed for a short period. With food shortages resulting from German U-boat action in the North Sea, barley was required for food stuffs and malting ceased. The line re-opened after a few months carrying wheat and hay as well as some barley.

A rail strike in 1919 and a miners strike in 1920, saw disruptions to trains services on the Snape Branch.

In 1923 operation of the branch became the responsibility of the London & North Eastern Railway.

A further strike in 1924 saw the loss of freight traffic to road transport.

In December 1927 snow closed the branch for four days. Two years later in 1929 as a result of complaints from local traders the facilities at Snape were expanded. Generally one train per day ran in this period.

In 1947 the line was blocked by snowdrifts for several days during the severe winter of that year.

In 1948 the railways were nationalised and operating the branch became the responsibility of British Railways Eastern Region.

On 30 September 1956 the branch was visited by the Suffolk Venturer Rail Tour hauled by an E4 class 2-4-0. This was the only public passenger train to work over the branch.

== Operations ==
At Snape Junction the only access was from the up main line (towards Ipswich and London) so trains would generally stop on the main line and propel down the branch. However photographic evidence exists of trains propelling from Wickham Market.

The line crossed a number of timber bridges which restricted the weight of locomotives that could operate over the branch.

When the line opened traffic would have been worked by ECR 0-6-0 locomotives built by Stothert and Slaughter. Other classes of locomotive that would have operated in the 1860s were a class of 2-4-0 designed by Robert Stephenson and a class of 0-6-0 locomotives designed by John Gooch.

The branch was later worked by Y class 2-4-0 locomotives designed by Sinclair and the 417 class 0-6-0 designed by Samuel Johnson. By the 1890s traffic was generally in the hands of 477 class 0-6-0 locomotives (another Johnson design) before traffic passed c.1900 to the mainstay of the branch traffic which was the Great Eastern Railway Y14 0-6-0 (better known by its LNER designation J15).

Other classes did visit the branch occasionally including GER C32 (LNER F3) and M15 (LNER F4) 2-4-2T engines and GER G58 (LNER J17) 0-6-0s.

In the early years trains were operated by Lowestoft, Norwich or Ipswich crews although later this became the almost exclusive preserve of Ipswich crews. The crews that worked the Framlingham Branch also worked the line occasionally.

In the early years of operation there was as many as three trains per day although this later reduced to two. This may have been because trains got longer as the haulage capabilities of early steam locomotives improved. Train locomotives never operated into the maltings themselves and shunting was carried out by horses or, in later year, by a Fordsons Tractor.

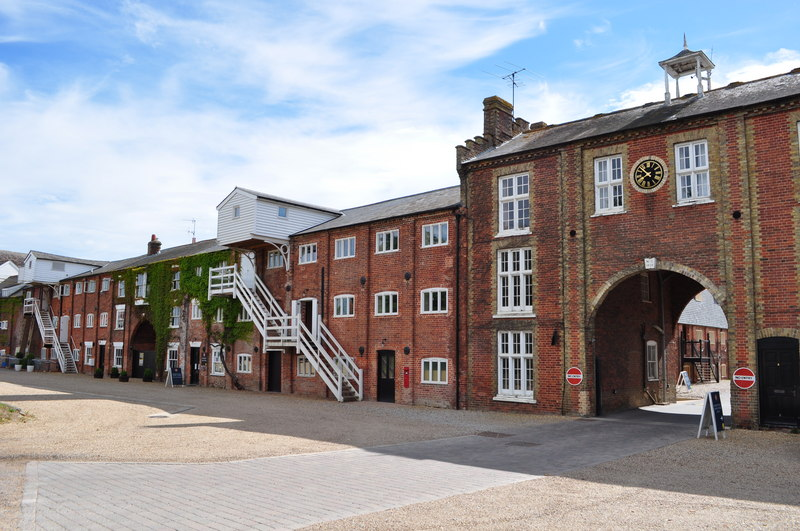
The rail entrance to Snape Maltings

In later years the Snape working was a bonus working operated by Ipswich engine shed drivers where the workings were carried out as quickly as possible (in order to qualify for the bonus?).

Signalling was initially by one engine in steam with a train staff but from 1873 this was changed to the Train Staff and Train Ticket method of operation. In 1892 the original method of operation was re-introduced. Initially a small hut was provided as a signal box at Snape but this was replaced by a small signal box c. 1892. This lasted until 1943 when all points were controlled from a ground frame and the box demolished. Snape Junction signal box closed in December 1960.

== Traffic ==
The Maltings were the raison d’etre of the branch line and the majority of traffic was connected with that establishment. Inwards traffic was barley, lime and coke – outwards traffic was predominantly malted barley. In the early years there was a limited amount of fish traffic although this soon switched to better connected ports. Although there were no cattle pens, livestock was occasionally handled.

In World War 1 there was additional agricultural traffic on the branch as part of the war effort which was generated by the shortages of imported food stuffs.

From the 1920s considerable tonnages of sugar beet were carried to factories at Sproughton (near Ipswich), Cantley and Bury St Edmunds, In its heyday Snape dealt with more sugar beet than any other East Anglian station. Inwards traffic included materials for road improvement schemes in the area.

Up until 1924 parcels traffic was relatively constant but this fell away as cartage rates became cheaper.

During World War 2 and afterwards, rubble from bombed buildings was unloaded at Snape and used for coastal defence purposes. Initially there were two trains per day but as the rubble was cleared this reduced and finally ceased in 1948.

As petrol rationing eased after World War 2 local agricultural traffic switched to road. This included the malted barley from the early 1950s.

During the final years of operation the only traffic of any significance was coal and coke for the maltings and seasonal sugar beet traffic.

== Closure ==
The line closed in 1960 as a result of declining freight revenues. Another factor was the J15 locomotives were life expired (steam had largely disappeared from East Anglia by this time) and the route availability of the line was such that only low speed shunting locomotives would be able to realistically operate the line. The time that these locomotives would take to get to Snape would have affected the timetable on the East Suffolk Line so the service was withdrawn instead.

The last train operated on 4 March 1960 worked by Ipswich engine shed’s J15 65389 with official closure following on 7 March. This was the last regular main line steam working in Suffolk. The track remained in situ until early 1961 after which it was lifted and land sold off to local farmers.
