= Leiston railway station =

Former railway station in England

Leiston
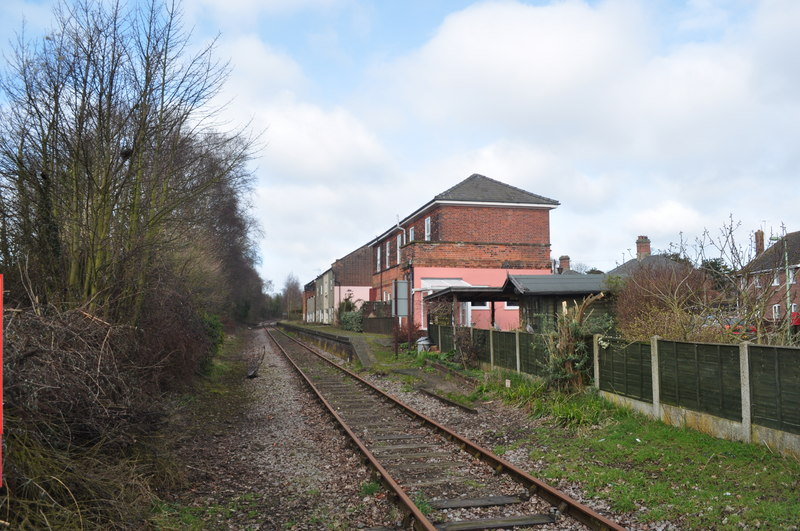
- Leiston railway station in 2010

General information
- Location: Leiston, East Suffolk; England
- Coordinates: 52.2100°N 1.5740°E
- Platforms: 1

Other information
- Status: Disused

History
- Original company: East Suffolk Railway
- Pre-grouping: Great Eastern Railway
- Post-grouping: London and North Eastern Railway

Key dates
- 1859: Opened
- 12 September 1966: Closed
Location

Leiston railway station was a station in Leiston, Suffolk. It was opened in 1859 by the East Suffolk Railway and later became part of the Great Eastern Railway on its 8.5 miles (13.7 km) branch line from Saxmundham to Aldeburgh. It was closed in 1966 as part of the Beeching Axe as much of the British rural rail network was cut back. The station survives intact and the line is still used to service the nearby nuclear power station at Sizewell.

== History ==
Passenger services lasted up until 1966 when the line closed to passengers. In August 1967, the track between Aldeburgh and Sizewell siding was lifted using steam cranes. By 1969, all that remained was one single line to Sizewell. In 2005, the line through the station was used for staff road training.

Former Services

| Preceding station | Disused railways | Following station |
|---|---|---|
| Saxmundham | Great Eastern Railway; Aldeburgh Branch Line | Thorpeness |
