= Cammell =

Cammell may refer to:

- British Rail Metro-Cammell Lightweight, lightweight Diesel multiple units introduced in 1955
- Cammell Laird, British shipbuilders during the nineteenth and twentieth centuries
  - Cammell Laird 1907 F.C., football club based at Kirklands Stadium in Rock Ferry, Birkenhead, Merseyside, England
  - Cammell Laird Gibraltar, ship repair facility at Gibraltar
  - Cammell Laird Social Club, the ninth album released by UK rock band Half Man Half Biscuit in 2002
- MTR Metro Cammell EMU (AC), electric multiple unit owned and operated by the Kowloon-Canton Railway Corporation
- Metro-Cammell, Birmingham, England based manufacturer of railway carriages and wagons
- Metro Cammell Weymann, formed in 1932 to produce bus bodies
- NZR RM class (Sentinel-Cammell), steam-powered railcar operated by the New Zealand Railways Department

== People with the surname ==
- Donald Cammell (1934–1996), Scottish film director
- Reginald Archibald Cammell (1886–1911), first British military aviator to die on active service
- Thomas Cammell
