= Thorpeness railway station =

Former station in Suffolk, England

Thorpeness
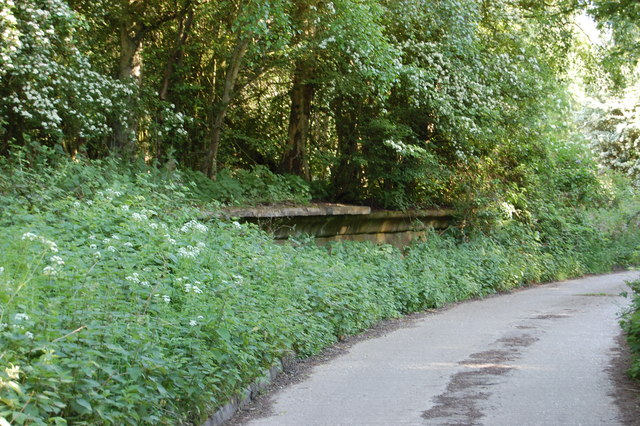
- Thorpeness railway station platform in 2009

General information
- Location: Thorpeness, East Suffolk; England
- Coordinates: 52.1873°N 1.6003°E
- Platforms: 1

Other information
- Status: Disused

History
- Original company: Great Eastern Railway
- Post-grouping: London and North Eastern Railway

Key dates
- 1914: Opened
- 12 September 1966: Closed
Location

Thorpeness railway station served the seaside resort of Thorpeness in Suffolk, England.

It was opened in 1914 by the Great Eastern Railway on its 8 1/2-mile (13.7 km) branch line from Saxmundham. It was closed in 1966 as part of the Beeching Axe.

As of 2023 the platform of the former station, now overgrown with vegetation, survives, just north of the B1353 road nearly a mile west of the coast. The trackbed is now a footpath.

Former Services

Preceding station	Disused railways	Following station
Leiston	Great Eastern Railway; Aldeburgh Branch Line	Aldeburgh
