= Aldeburgh railway station =

Former station in Suffolk, England

Coordinates: 52.1575°N 1.5937°E

Aldeburgh
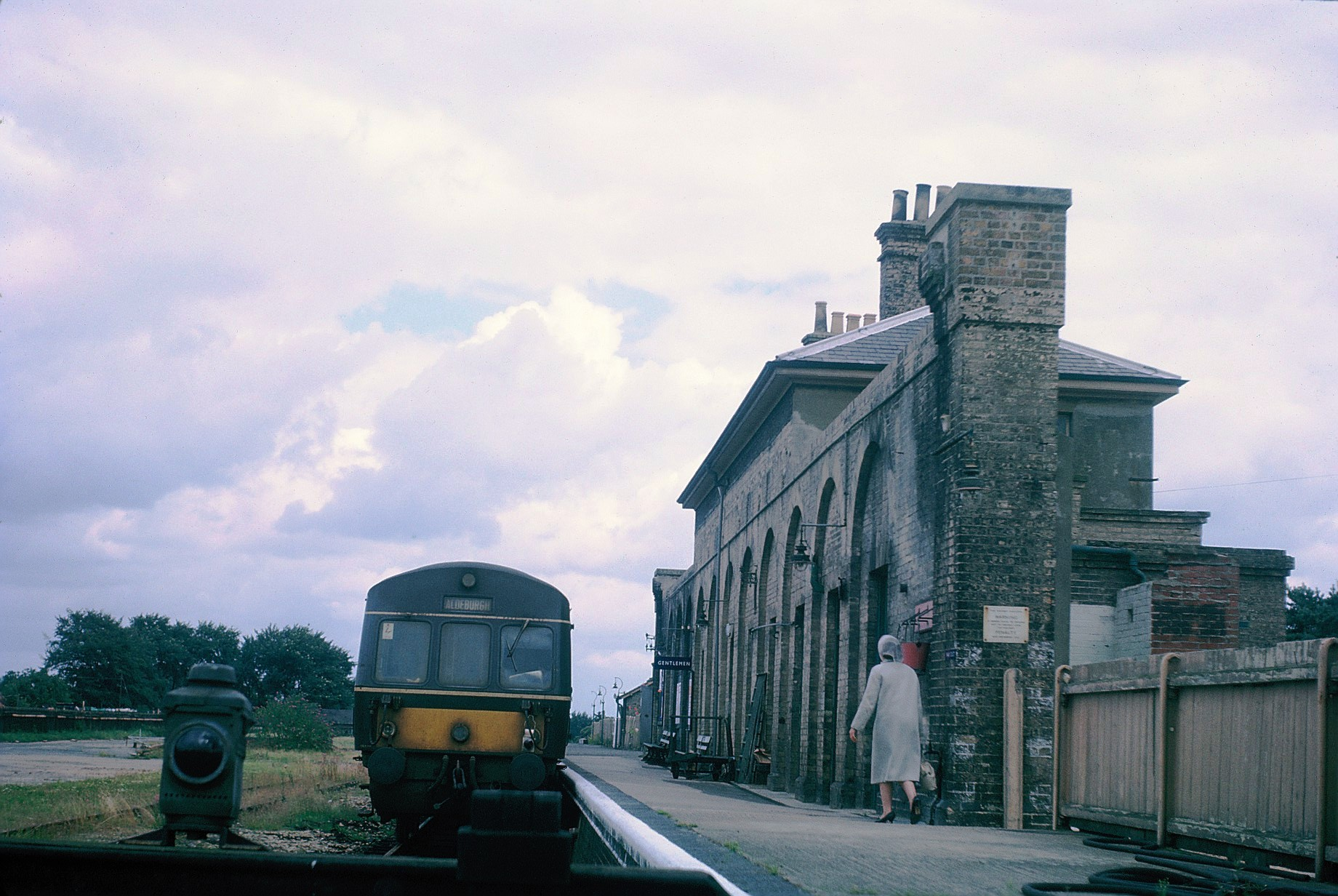
- Aldeburgh station in August 1966, a month before closure

General information
- Location: Aldeburgh, East Suffolk; England
- Platforms: 1

Other information
- Status: Disused

History
- Original company: East Suffolk Railway
- Pre-grouping: Great Eastern Railway
- Post-grouping: London and North Eastern Railway

Key dates
- 12 April 1860: Opened as Aldborough
- 1 June 1875: Renamed Aldeburgh
- 12 September 1966: Closed
Location

Aldeburgh railway station (originally Aldborough) served the town of Aldeburgh, Suffolk, England. It was opened in 1860 by the East Suffolk Railway and later came under the control of the Great Eastern Railway. It was the terminus of an 8 1/2-mile (13.7 km) branch line to Saxmundham and was closed in 1966 as part of the Beeching Axe.

== History ==
The East Suffolk Railway had opened a branch line between Saxmundham and Leiston predominantly to serve Garretts engineering works on 1 June 1859. The town of Aldeburgh lobbied hard and permission to extend the branch was granted on 19 April 1859. The line was built by the Eastern Counties Railway, who had taken over the operation of the East Suffolk Railway. The new station (incorrectly named Aldborough) opened on 12 April 1860, situated 1/2 mile (0.80 km) inland from the coast.

By the 1860s, the railways in East Anglia were in financial trouble and most were leased to the ECR; they wished to amalgamate formally but could not obtain government agreement for this until 1862, when the Great Eastern Railway was formed by amalgamation.

The station was renamed as Aldeburgh on 1 June 1875. The initial platform was quite short and was extended to 420 feet (130 m) in 1884. There was a large goods shed and small engine shed on site, and the station had an overall roof.

The Grouping of 1923 saw the station pass to the London and North Eastern Railway. Between 1924 and 1939 and between 1946 and closure the station was noted for its well-kept gardens, tended by porter Billy Botterill, who won numerous prizes in railway gardening competitions.

In 1929 the LNER introduced luxurious Pullman day excursion trips from Liverpool Street to various seaside resorts. The service, known as the Eastern Belle, served Felixstowe on Mondays, Frinton and Walton on Tuesdays, Clacton on Wednesdays and Thorpeness and Aldeburgh on Thursdays and Fridays. The service ended in September 1939 when the Second World War broke out.

The station then became part of the Eastern Region of British Railways on nationalisation in 1948. Eight years later, in June 1956, operation of the passenger services were taken over by Diesel Multiple Unit trains with conductor guard operation. Goods services were withdrawn on 30 November 1959.

The overall roof was demolished in August 1965 and train services were withdrawn by the British Railways Board on 10 September 1966, with the line formally closing two days later.

There is a video of the line on YouTube taken in 1957 called "1957 Saxmundham to Aldeburgh Railway line", which shows Thorpeness Halt and Aldeburgh stations and views of the track.

The station site was cleared in 1975.

== The site today ==
Today a roundabout sits on its former site, close to a pub called The Railway Inn. The branch track is still used as far as Sizewell (approx 3 1/2 miles (5.6 km) north), for the removal of nuclear material from the Sizewell nuclear power stations.

Former Services

Preceding station	Disused railways	Following station
Thorpeness	Great Eastern Railway; Aldeburgh Branch	Terminus
