= Aldeburgh branch line =

Disused railway line in East Suffolk

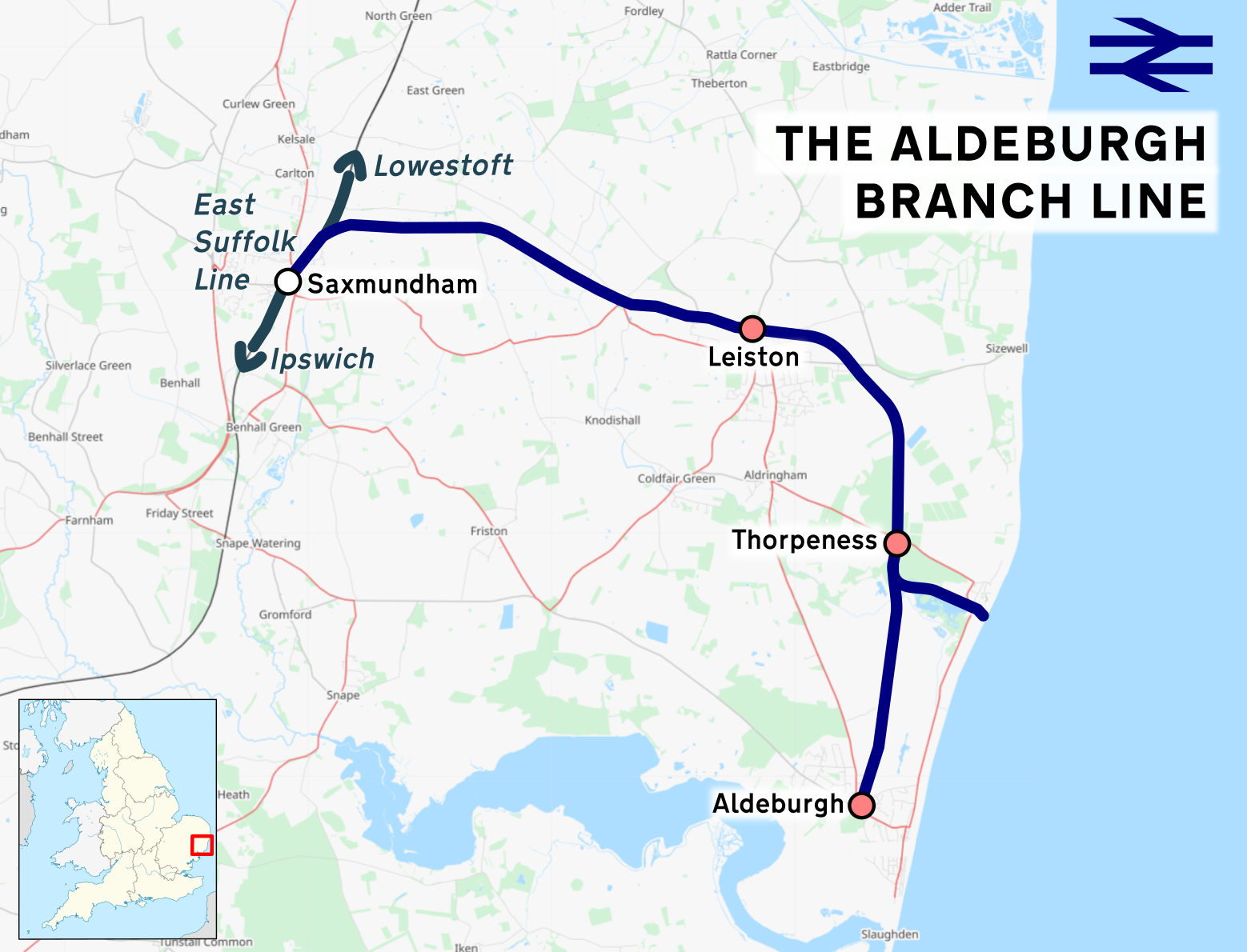
Route map (Click to expand)

The Aldeburgh branch line was a railway branch line linking the town of Saxmundham on the East Suffolk line and the seaside resort of Aldeburgh. There were intermediate stops at Leiston and Thorpeness. Part of the line remains in use for nuclear flask trains servicing Sizewell nuclear power station.

== Early history ==
The line opened as far as Leiston on 1 June 1859 and was extended by four miles (6.4 km) to Aldeburgh on 12 April 1860.

The line was proposed by Samuel Morton Peto and supported by local agricultural machine manufacturer Richard Garrett. The Leiston Works Railway operated to link the line to Garrett's Leiston works. Operated initially by the Eastern Counties Railway, it was taken over by the Great Eastern Railway in 1862.

== Route ==
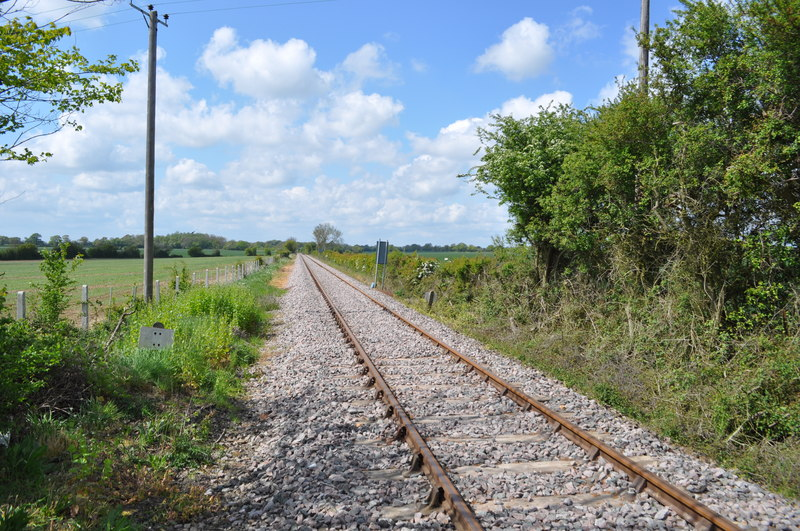
The railway stub near Leiston

Most trains started their journey at Saxmundham railway station and travelled 1/2 mile (0.8 km) northwards along the East Suffolk line to Saxmundham Junction where the Aldeburgh branch diverged eastwards across fields towards Leiston. The line climbs sharply over a ridge of higher ground before falling gently towards the coast. The first station is Leiston — 4 1/2 miles (7.2 km) — which, in addition to having goods sidings, also had the branch line to the south serving the Richard Garrett & Sons works. Part of that line is still extant as Leiston Works Railway. 16 chains (322 m) east of the station was a siding on the north side of the line, to the south of Carr Avenue, east of what is now the Jehovah's Witnesses Hall. It originally served the town gasworks, but was later in service as a coal siding until the 1960s.

There was another industrial siding at Sizewell which was originally provided for cattle traffic from the local marshes, and this location (to the east of Sizewell Sports Club, south of King George's Avenue) is the present day terminus of the line. It is believed this siding was opened in 1860. Thorpeness station — 6 1/2 miles (10.5 km) — was a single platform affair, and in latter years its station buildings consisted of three former carriage bodies supported at the back by concrete sleepers.

The three carriages were recorded as:

- GER No. 51 into service May 1883 – 5-compartment third class 6-wheeler withdrawn 23 September 1920
- GER No. 1480 into service September 1880 – 5-compartment second class 6-wheeler withdrawn 17 July 1914
- GER No. 435 into service March 1897 – first class 4-wheeler withdrawn 19 September 1926

There was a siding provided here from 1921 for goods traffic.

The terminus of the line at Aldeburgh consisted of a single platform with an attractive overall roof – quite an unusual feature for the Great Eastern. The station building was a two-storey affair. There was a small goods shed as well as a small engine shed at this location. A hotel (The Railway Hotel) was built at the same time next to the station; it later became The Railway Tavern and exists today as The Railway Inn.

== Historical timeline ==
- 1859 – Line completed as far as Leiston. Garrett's branch to brickworks and engineering works opened at same time (1 June).
- 1860 – Line opened Leiston to Aldeburgh
- 1912 – Leiston East siding opened to serve gasworks
- 1914 – Thorpeness station opens
- 1920 – Goods siding at Thorpeness opens
- 1923 – The London and North Eastern Railway take over operation of services
- 1929 – Locomotive Sirapite starts operating Garrett's branch previously worked by horse, gravity and cable
- 1944 – Leiston east siding takes delivery of 1,383 wagon loads in 4 months
- 1948 – Railways nationalised – branch operated by British Railways (Eastern Region)
- 1959 – goods traffic withdrawn from Thorpeness and Aldeburgh (November)
- 1962 – Sirapite is retired and replaced by a battery locomotive
- 1963 – The Beeching Report recommends closure of the branch but there is significant local opposition
- 1965 – Overall roof at Aldeburgh demolished (August)
- 1966 – Passenger services withdrawn (12 September). Operations cease south of Sizewell.
- 1968 – Garrett's Leiston branch is closed and battery locomotive scrapped.
- 1972 – Saxmundham Junction signal box demolished and replaced by ground frame.
- 1975 – Aldeburgh station building demolished and houses built on site
- 1987–1990 – Operation of construction trains for building of Sizewell B nuclear power station
- 2004 – Sirapite returns to Leiston's Long Shop Museum
- 2009 – Sirapite returned to working order at Long Shop Museum in Leiston
- 2025 - First Sizewell C construction trains use the line

== Passenger train services ==
In April 1860, there were 5 trains each way between Aldeburgh and Saxmundham. In October 1921, there were 8 services each way, two of which were shown as mixed. In 1922, there were direct services to Aldeburgh from London Liverpool Street Station (journey time 3 hours 33 minutes). These consisted of a carriage(s) dropped off the Lowestoft express services and operated between 1906 and 1939.

In the Winter 1951/52 timetable, there were six trains per day each way. In the September 1964 timetable, there were seven trains each way with three through trains to Ipswich one of which continued to Colchester (Mondays to Fridays only). In the opposite direction, only one service originated at Ipswich. No Sunday services. The final 1965/66 timetable showed seven trains each way.

The final passenger train was worked over the branch by British Rail Metro-Cammell diesel multiple units numbers 79066 and 79282. Driver Skeels from Ipswich engine shed was at the controls. The event was filmed.

In September 2011, Suffolk County Council investigated the possibility of running train services between Saxmundham and Leiston Stations using a Parry People Mover light railcar.

In connection with the construction of Sizewell C power station, train operator DRS were in June 2012 considering passenger services to serve the power station. Whether this would mean the re-opening of Leiston station or a new station is currently unclear.

== Freight train services ==
Initial freight services would have included agricultural produce and coal. Up until 1914, there was a good trade in fish, but when Aldeburgh harbour became blocked by shingle banks this traffic ceased.

From the line's opening, Garrett's establishment was responsible for significant freight traffic, which lasted until the 1960s. The goods yard there was still open in 1972, when it was recorded as handling military traffic.

During the 1920s, a concrete factory existed at Thorpeness and was served by the siding.

Building materials for both Sizewell A in the 1960s and Sizewell B power stations between 1987 and 1990 were brought in by rail.

Today, trains servicing the power station are the only regular source of traffic on the branch, and these are operated by Direct Rail Services who have a depot at nearby Stowmarket.

On 18 October 2010, the British government announced that Sizewell was one of the eight sites it considered suitable for future nuclear power stations. The UK Government confirmed that Sizewell C will go ahead and the branch to the power station will be upgraded. The line will be upgraded with full signalling, new track, ballast and sleepers, and all traincrew operated level crossings (TMO) upgraded to automatic barrier crossings (ABCL). The new works will also involve building a new 2-mile-59-chain (4.4 km) branch to the north of the Sizewell complex, with four sidings, and the creation of an ancillary works yard just east of Leiston. During this time, the existing offloading gantry at the end of the current branch will be mothballed, but brought back into use when all construction works are completed.

== Locomotives ==
Locomotives known to have worked the branch include:

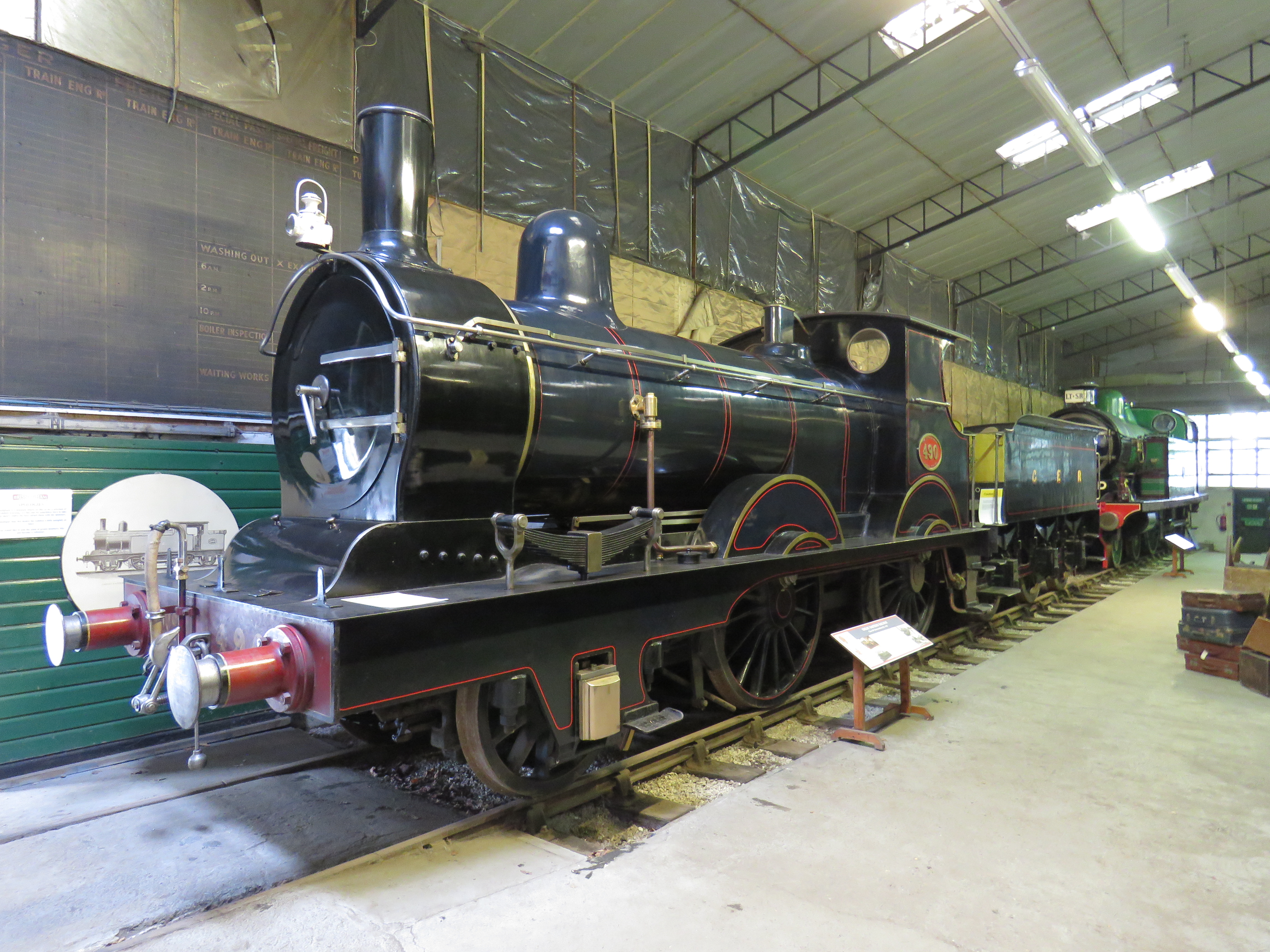
490 at Bressingham

- GER Class Y14 0-6-0 LNE classification J15
- GER Class T26 2-4-0 LNE classification E4 'Intermediates'
- GER Class S69 4-6-0 LNE classification B12
- GER Class G69 2-4-2T LNE classification F6 'Gobblers'
- LMS Ivatt Class 2 2-6-2T

These locomotives would have most likely been allocated to Ipswich engine shed and it is possible that other smaller classes of engine from that depot would have worked the line. As mentioned Aldeburgh had a small engine shed which was a sub-shed of Ipswich and used to stable the branch locomotive overnight.

In the diesel era the following locomotive classes worked freight services:

- Class 15
- Class 20
- Class 21
- Class 24
- Class 31
- Class 37

Ipswich shed was one of the first depots to convert to diesel only power and as a result operation of passenger services passed to Diesel Multiple Units based at Norwich. DMU types that are known to have worked the branch include:

- British Rail Class 105
- Derby Lightweight
- British Rail Metro-Cammell
