= British Rail Metro-Cammell Lightweight =

Class of 36 two-car diesel multiple units

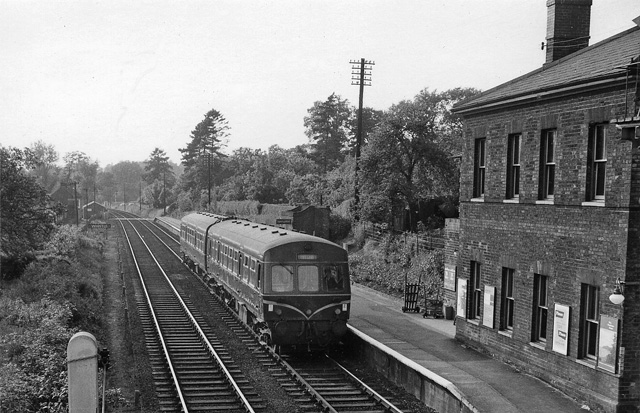
- An Eastern Region set at Brundall
- In service: 1955–1981
- Manufacturer: Metropolitan Cammell
- Scrapped: 1967–1969, 1981
- Number built: 36 sets (72 cars)
- Number scrapped: All
- Formation: 2 car sets: DMBS-DTSL or DMBS-DTCL
- Capacity: DMBS: 57 or 53 second class seats DTSL: 72 second class DTCL: 12 first and 53 second class
- Operators: British Rail

Specifications
- Train length: 114 ft 0 in (34.75 m)
- Car length: 57 ft 0 in (17.37 m)
- Width: 9 ft 3 in (2.82 m)
- Weight: DMBS: 31 long tons 10 cwt (70,500 lb or 32,000 kg); DTSL: 25 long tons 0 cwt (56,000 lb or 25,000 kg)
- Prime mover(s): Two BUT (AEC) 6-cylinder diesels
- Power output: 150 hp (112 kW) each engine
- Transmission: Mechanical: 4-speed epicyclic gearbox
- Braking system(s): Vacuum
- Multiple working: ◆ Yellow Diamond
- Track gauge: 4 ft 8 1/2 in (1,435 mm)

In 1955, Metropolitan Cammell produced its first lightweight diesel multiple units, the prototypes of what were to become one of British Rail's most successful and longest-lived First Generation DMU types, the Class 101.

== Operations ==
The seven London Midland Region sets (formed DMBS + DTCL) were used on the Bury-Bacup line services, while the other sets (formed DMBS + DTSL) were all allocated to the Eastern Region. These sets were used on a variety of lines in East Anglia as well as the (then) non-electrified lines in Essex (Romford-Upminster and Wickford-Southminster branches).

A unit consisting of 79066 and 79282 worked the last passenger service on the Aldeburgh Branch Line in 1966.

== Withdrawal ==
They proved to be very successful, but with line closures continuing through the 1960s, including many in East Anglia where the type was first used, their non-standard coupling arrangements left them prone to early withdrawal, which took place during 1967–1969.

== Departmental use ==
All were scrapped following withdrawal, except two (79047 + 79053), which were taken into departmental (non-revenue earning) service as 975018 + 975019. They were used at the Railway Technical Centre in Derby as Laboratory 21: Plasma Torch Research. When this extended life was complete, they too were scrapped, in 1981.

== Fleet details ==
Table of orders and numbers
Lot No.	Type	Diagram	Qty	Fleet numbers	Notes
30190	Driving Motor Brake Second (DMBS)	591	29	E79047–79075	56 seats
30190	Driving Motor Brake Second (DMBS)	592	7	M79076–79082	52 seats
30191	Driving Trailer Second with Lavatory (DTSL)	593	29	E79263–79291	72 seats
30191	Driving Trailer Composite with Lavatory (DTCL)	594	7	M79626–79632	12 first 53-second
