= Long Shop Museum =

Richard Garrett & Sons museum

Coordinates: 52.2073°N 1.5754°E

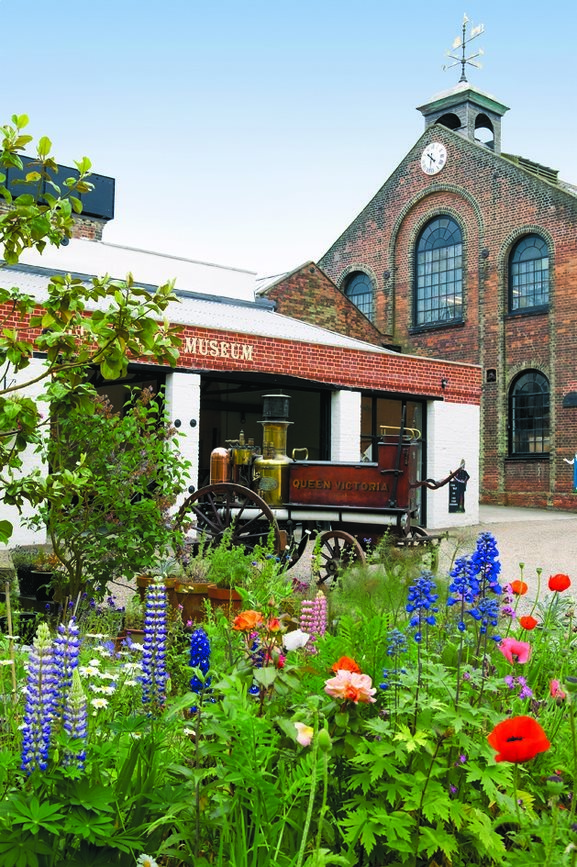
The Long Shop Museum

The Long Shop Museum is an industrial heritage museum in the town of Leiston in the English county of Suffolk. The museum features the history of Richard Garrett & Sons who manufactured a wide range of industrial and agricultural machinery, steam engines, and electric vehicles. The museum also celebrates the social history of a rural community that grew to be central to the Industrial Revolution.

The Museum is housed in some of the remaining buildings of Garrett's Leiston Town Works. The centre-piece "Long Shop" was constructed in 1852 as the first purpose-built flow-line assembly workshop for the manufacture of portable steam engines. It consists of an open central area, and fitters' galleries on the level of the first floor. The building is a Grade II* listed building.
