= Saxmundham railway station =

Railway station in Suffolk, England

Coordinates: 52.2150°N 1.4901°E

Saxmundham
- Saxmundham railway station

General information
- Location: Saxmundham, East Suffolk; England
- Grid reference: TM385631
- Managed by: Greater Anglia
- Platforms: 2

Other information
- Station code: SAX
- Classification: DfT category F1

History
- Opened: 1859

Passengers
- 2020/21: ▼35,022
- 2021/22: ▲0.139 million
- 2022/23: ▲0.157 million
- 2023/24: ▲0.164 million
- 2024/25: ▲0.177 million
Location
Notes
- Passenger statistics from the Office of Rail and Road

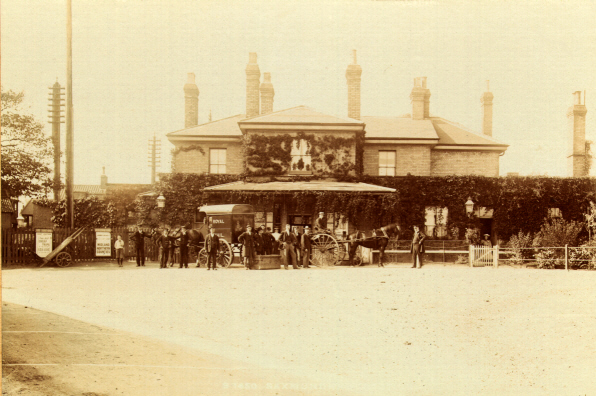
Saxmundham station, c. 1901

Saxmundham railway station is on the East Suffolk Line in the east of England, serving the town of Saxmundham, Suffolk. Situated between Wickham Market and Darsham, it is 22 miles 29 chains (36 km) down the line from Ipswich, and 91 miles 11 chains (147 km) from London Liverpool Street. Its three-letter station code is SAX.

It is managed by Greater Anglia, which operates all trains serving the station.

The signalling centre for the line is located in the signal cabin on the Lowestoft-bound platform, which formerly served as the control centre while the line was signalled using the Radio Electronic Token Block (RETB) system.

A branch line, which formerly ran to Aldeburgh on the coast from just north of Saxmundham, is still used for goods traffic to the nearby Sizewell nuclear power stations.

== History ==
The station building suffered a devastating fire on 12 February 2018. Following the fire, the station was renovated with a new waiting room, refurbished platform canopies, a new shelter and seating on platform 2, and an enlarged car park. A ceremony marking the completion of the refurbishment took place on 27 September 2021.

== Services ==
As of December 2019 the typical Monday-Sunday off-peak service at Saxmundham is as follows:

Operator	Route	Rolling stock	Typical frequency
Greater Anglia	Lowestoft - Oulton Broad South - Beccles - Brampton - Halesworth - Darsham - Saxmundham - Wickham Market - Melton - Woodbridge - Ipswich	Class 755	1x per hour in each direction

Trains direct to and from London Liverpool Street were withdrawn in 2010.

One weekday early morning train is extended through to Harwich International and there is a return from there in the evening.

One service terminates at Saxmundham every weekday morning: the 06:20 from Ipswich, which includes a stop at Westerfield.

Preceding station	National Rail	Following station
Darsham	Greater Anglia East Suffolk Line	Wickham Market
Historical railways
Terminus	Great Eastern Railway Aldeburgh Branch Line	Leiston Line open, station closed
