= Richard Garrett & Sons =

British vehicle manufacturer

Coordinates: 52.207800°N 1.575796°E

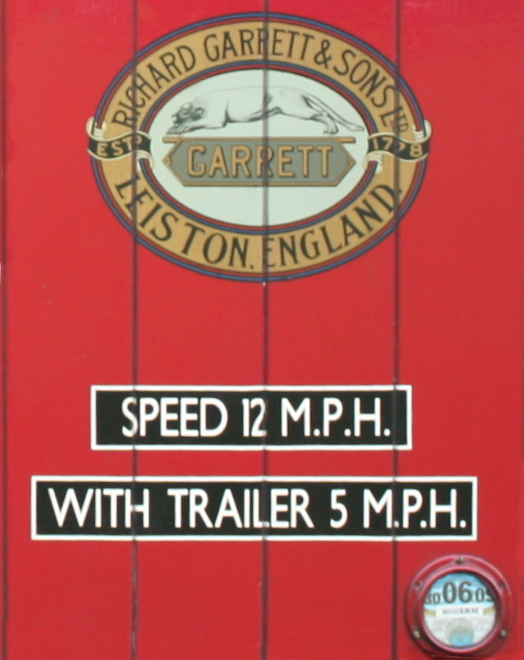
The Garrett Company logo detail on side of lorry cab

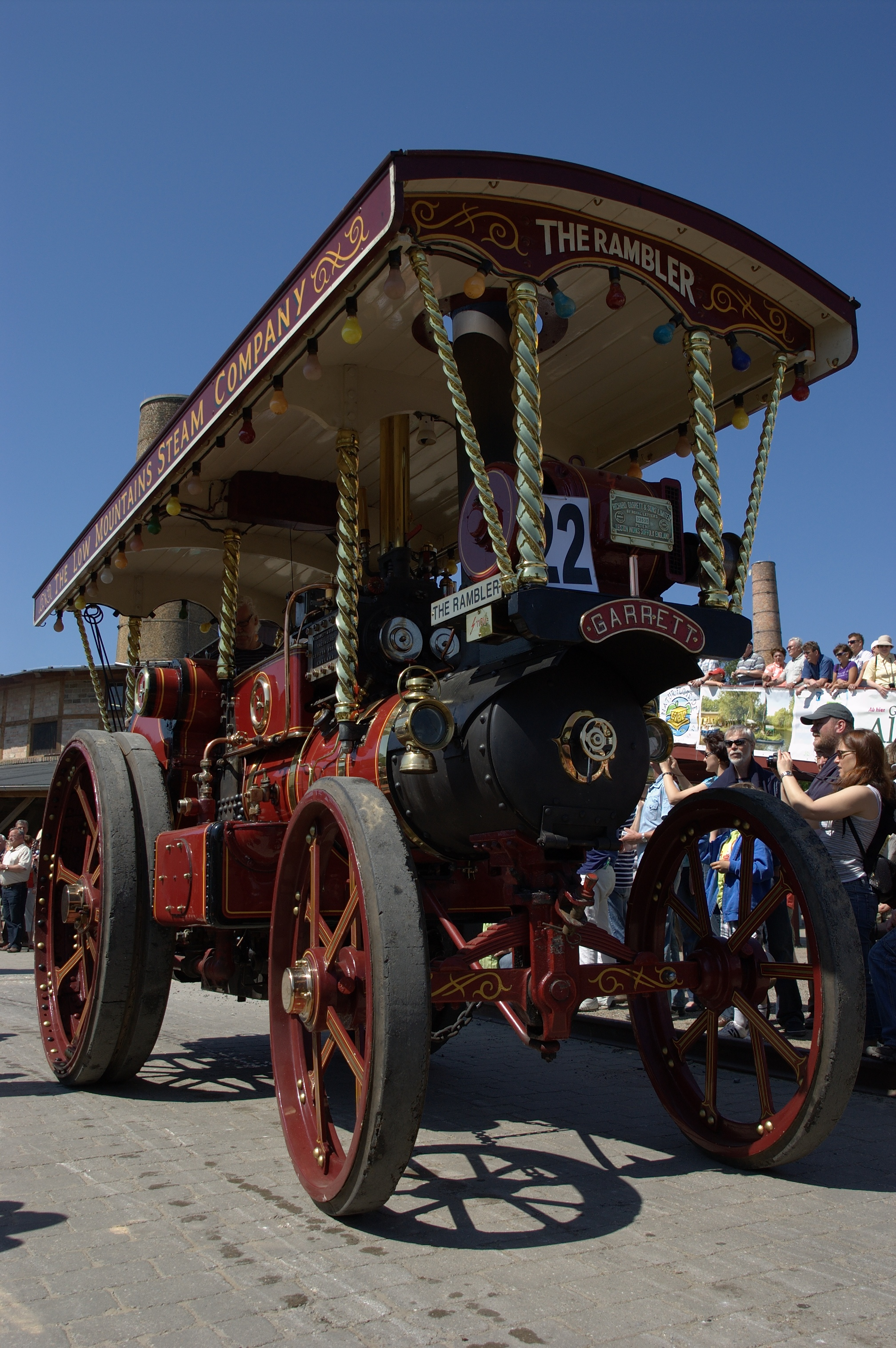
Garrett showman's engine The Rambler

R Garrett & Sons traction engine recorded at Fawley Hill, 18 May 2013.

Richard Garrett & Sons was a manufacturer of agricultural machinery, steam engines and trolleybuses. Their factory was Leiston Works, in Leiston, Suffolk, England. The company was founded by Richard Garrett in 1778.

The company was active under its original ownership between 1778 and 1932.

In the late 1840s, after cultivating a successful agricultural machine and implement business, the company began producing portable steam engines. The company grew to a major business employing about 2,500 people. Richard Garrett III, grandson of the company's founder, visited the Great Exhibition in London in 1851, where he saw some new American manufacturing ideas. Richard Garrett III introduced flow line production – a very early assembly line – and constructed a new workshop for the purpose in 1852, known as the "long shop" on account of its length. A machine would start at one end of the long shop and as it progressed through the building it would stop at various stages where new parts would be added. There was also an upper level where other parts were made; they would be lowered over a balcony and then fixed onto the machine on the ground level. When the machine reached the end of the shop, it would be complete.

In 1914, following a major fire at the works, it was decided to build a new factory on land that had been owned as a demonstration farm next to the station. From then on the sites were always known as the "Old Works" and the "New Works".

The company joined the Agricultural & General Engineers (AGE) combine in 1919, and the combine entered receivership in 1932.

The company was purchased by Beyer, Peacock & Company in 1932 after the collapse of AGE. The business continued as Richard Garrett Engineering Works until the works finally closed in 1981.

Today, part of the old works is preserved as the Long Shop Museum. Some of the offices are used as flats but the rest of that site has been demolished and the land used for housing. Some of the New Works is still used as industrial units while the offices have been converted to flats and more built on the site, known as Colonial House. About 120 of the company's steam engines survived into preservation.

== Products ==
=== Portable engines ===
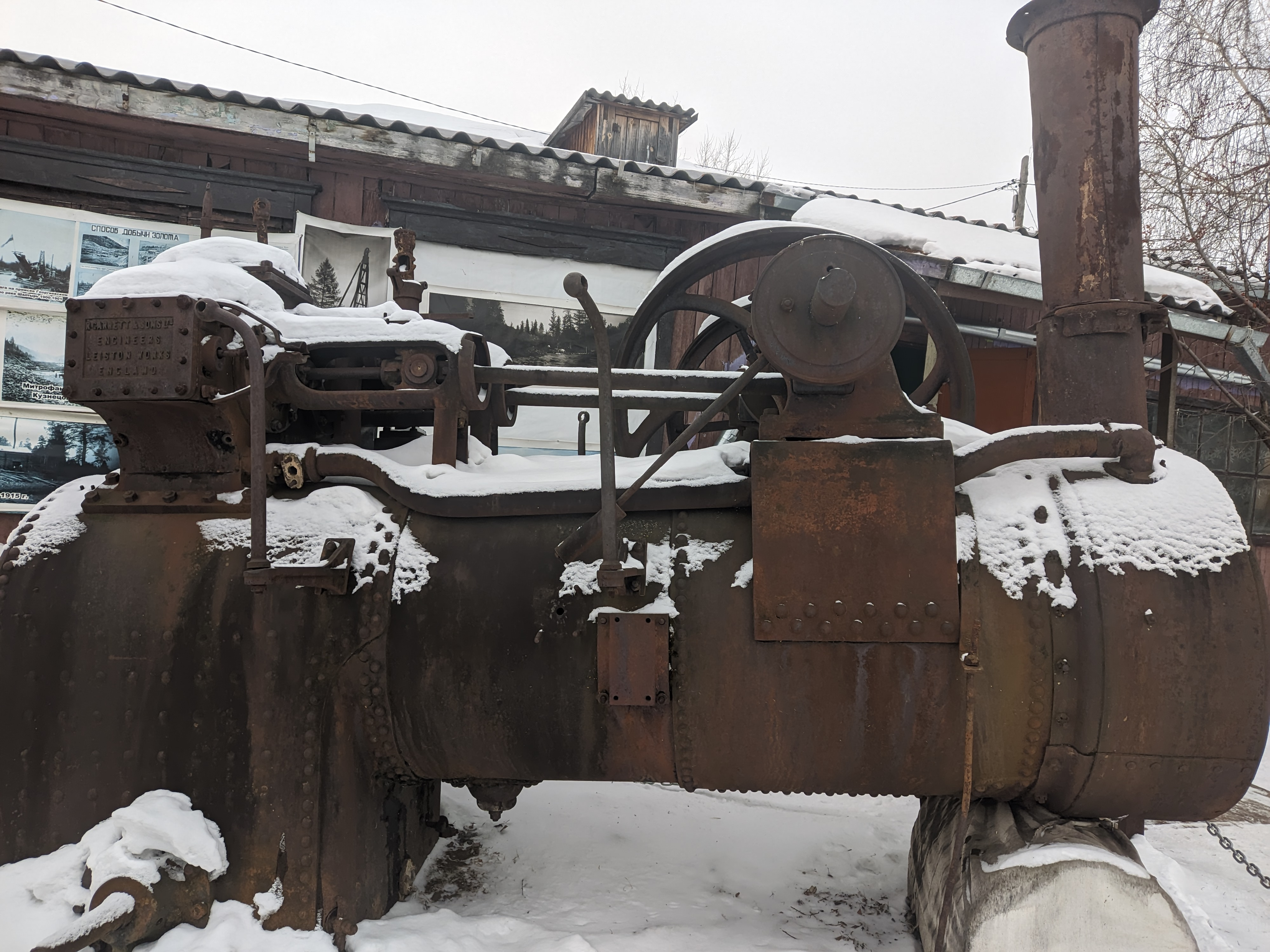
Richard Garrett & Sons portable steam engine, located in Sukhobuzimskoye's local history museum

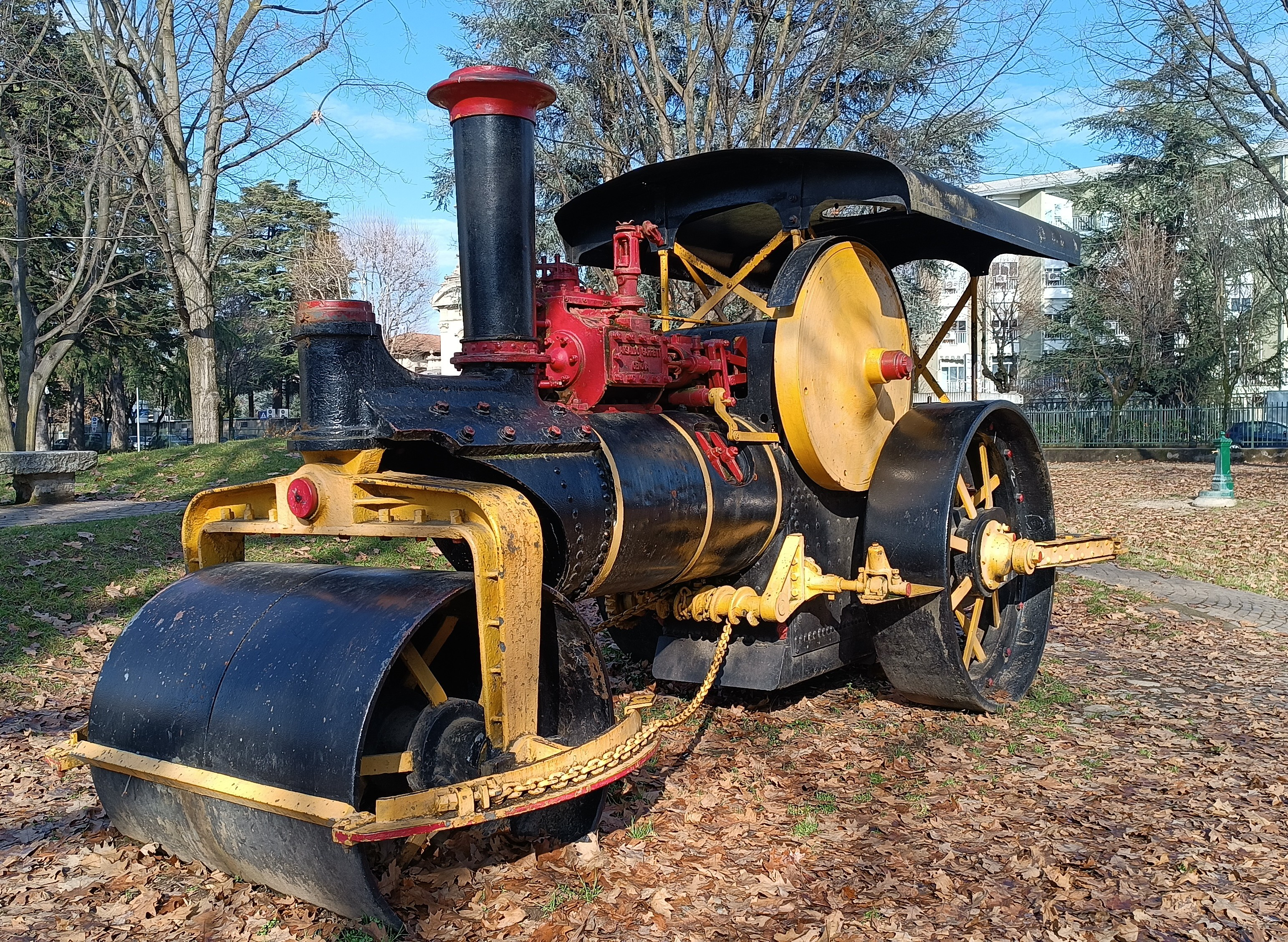
Ansaldo-Garrett steam roller

The majority of the steam engines produced by Garrett were portable engines – combined with their fixed steam engines and semi-portables, they represented 89% of the works' output.

=== Traction engines ===
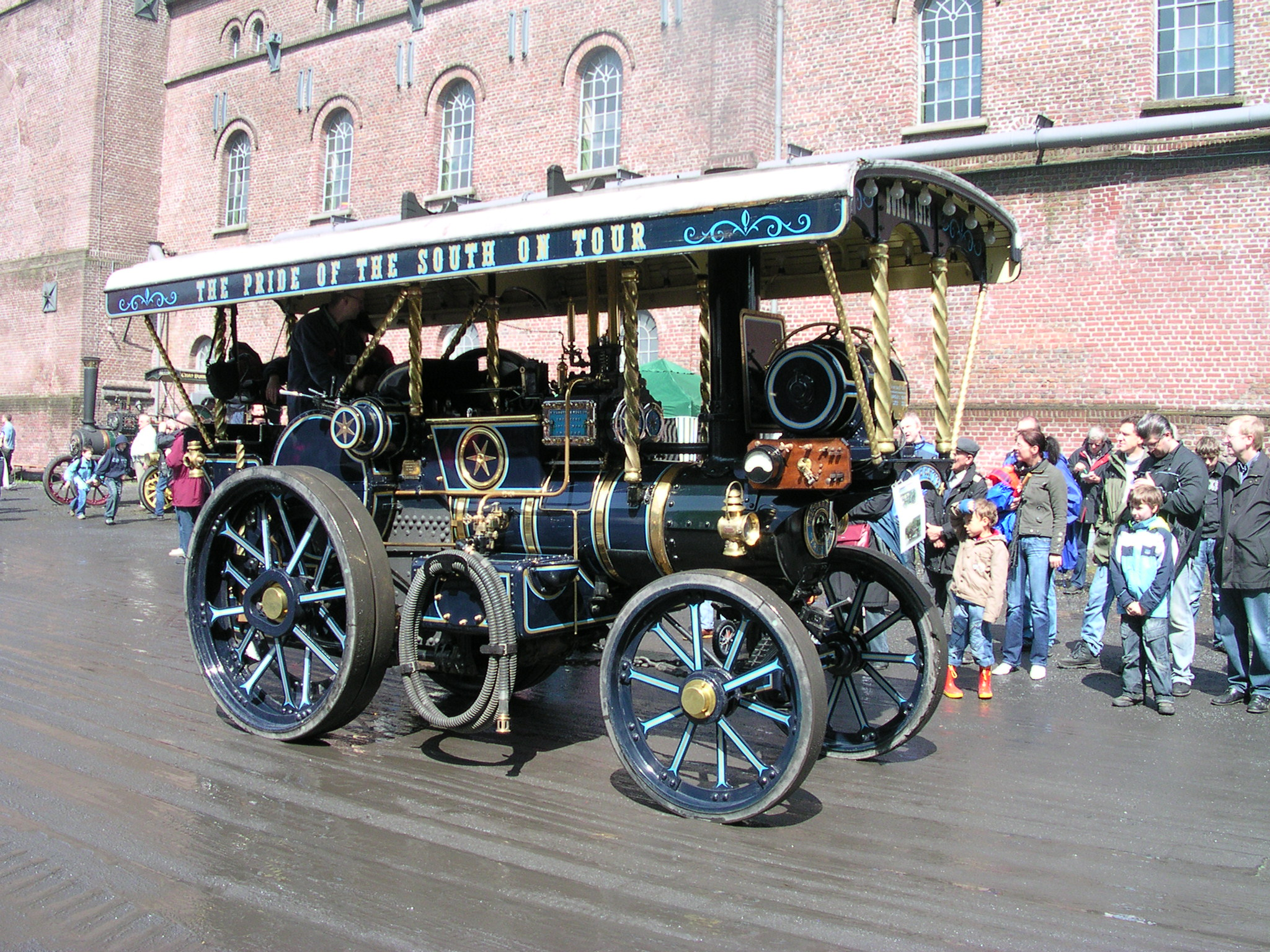
Richard Garrett & Sons No.4 showman's tractor 31193, built 1913

Garrett produced a wide range of traction engines and ploughing engines, 49% of which were exported.

=== Steam rollers ===
The construction of steam rollers was generally apportioned to Aveling & Porter by the AGE combine, limiting the production of these engines by Garrett. 90% of the rollers produced by Garrett were exported. Garrett rollers were produced under licence under the name "Ansaldo-Garrett" by Gio. Ansaldo & C. of Italy.

=== Steam tractors ===
Richard Garrett and Sons are perhaps best known for their steam tractors, the most popular design of which was the Number 4 compound tractor, commonly referred to as the "4CD".

=== Steam wagons ===
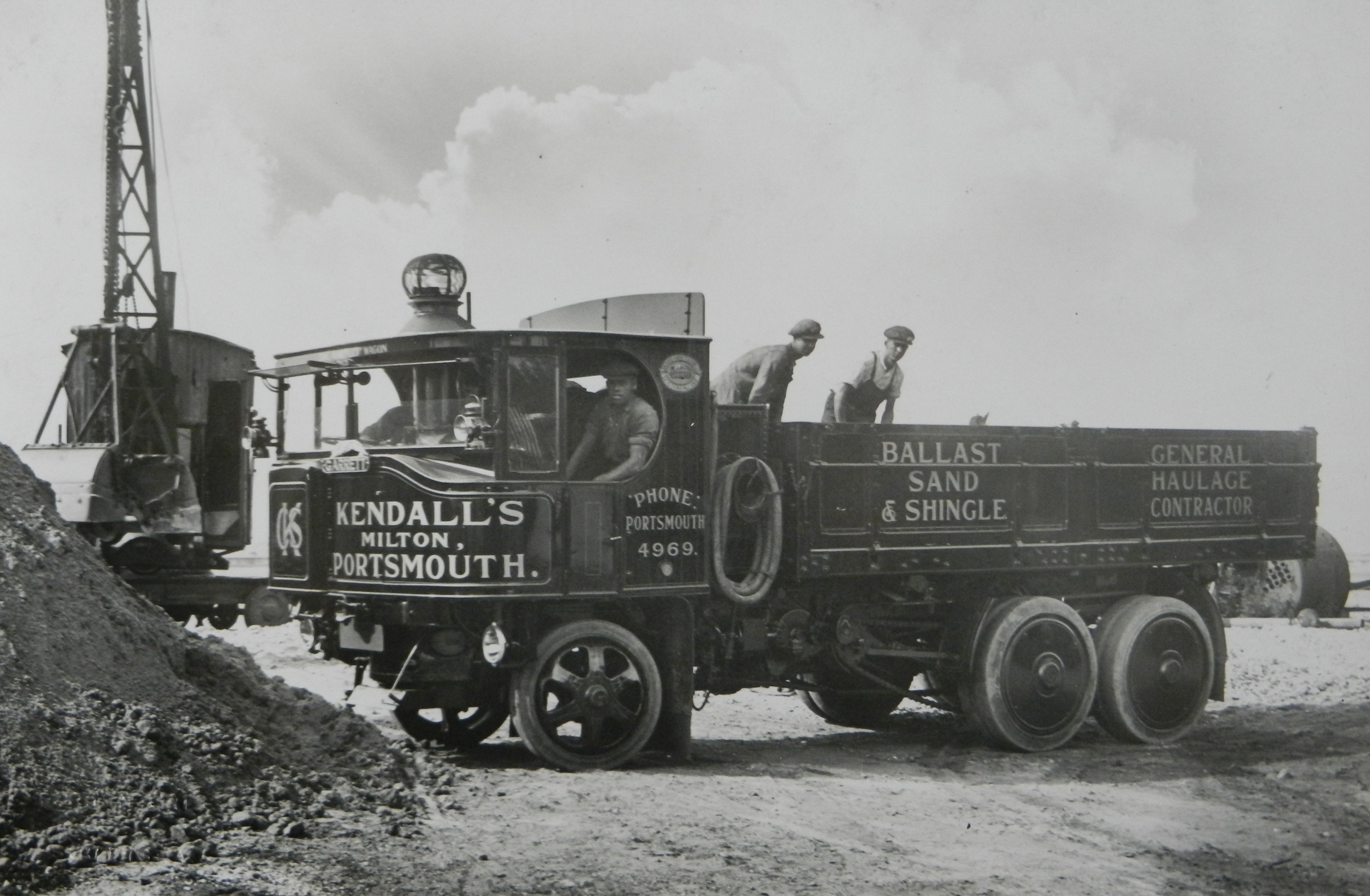
Garrett Six Wheeled tipping wagon 35464 of 1931

The company produced steam wagons of both the undertype and overtype configurations. Their first steam wagons were three relatively unsuccessful undertypes constructed between 1904 and 1908.

The failed undertype wagons were followed by a relatively successful line of overtypes, the first being constructed in 1909. These wagons were developed using the experience Garrett's designers had gained producing the tractors. The majority of these wagons were fitted with superheaters, a feature used as a marketing point against the un-superheated Foden wagons. The overtype wagons were initially produced in a 5-ton capacity, with a 3-ton design following in 1911. By the early 1920s, the overtype wagon market was declining in the face of competition from undertype steam wagons and petrol wagons. In 1926 a last-ditch attempt was made to produce an updated design of 6-ton capacity using components from the new undertype designs, but only 8 were produced. Overall, 693 overtypes were produced to the firm's designs.

The final Aveling & Porter overtype wagons were assembled by Garrett, under the arrangements made at the formation of AGE.

By 1920 the success of the Sentinel undertypes was evident, and Garretts decided to re-enter the undertype wagon market. Their first prototype was produced in 1921, driven by a two-cylinder engine with piston valves actuated by Joy valve gear. Unusually for the time, the wagon was fitted with Timken roller bearings on the crankshaft, countershaft and axles. This design was built under licence as the "Adamov-Garrett" by Adamov of Czechoslovakia from 1925. In 1926 a prototype rigid six-wheeled wagon was produced. In 1927 a poppet valve engine replaced the earlier design, this being used until the end of production in 1932. 310 wagons were produced in this second phase of undertype construction.

=== Electric vehicles ===
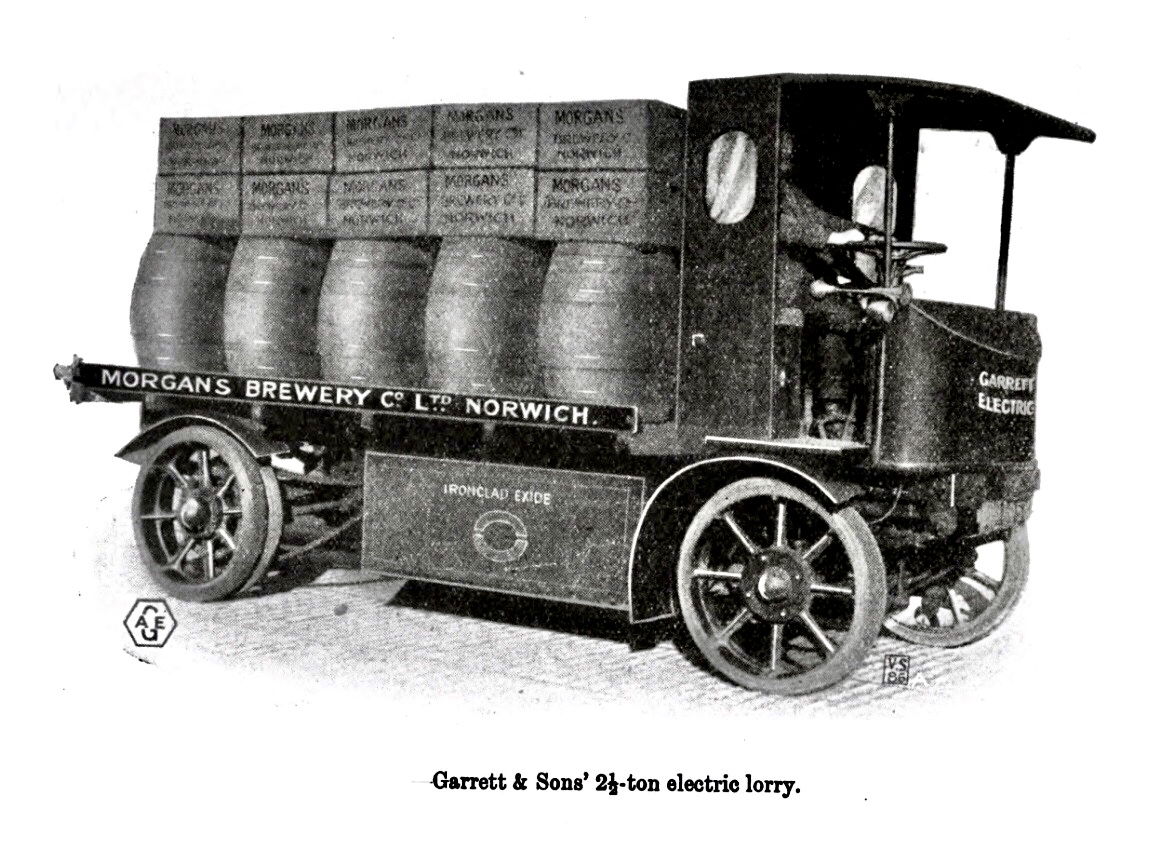
Garrett & Sons 2.5 t (1920)

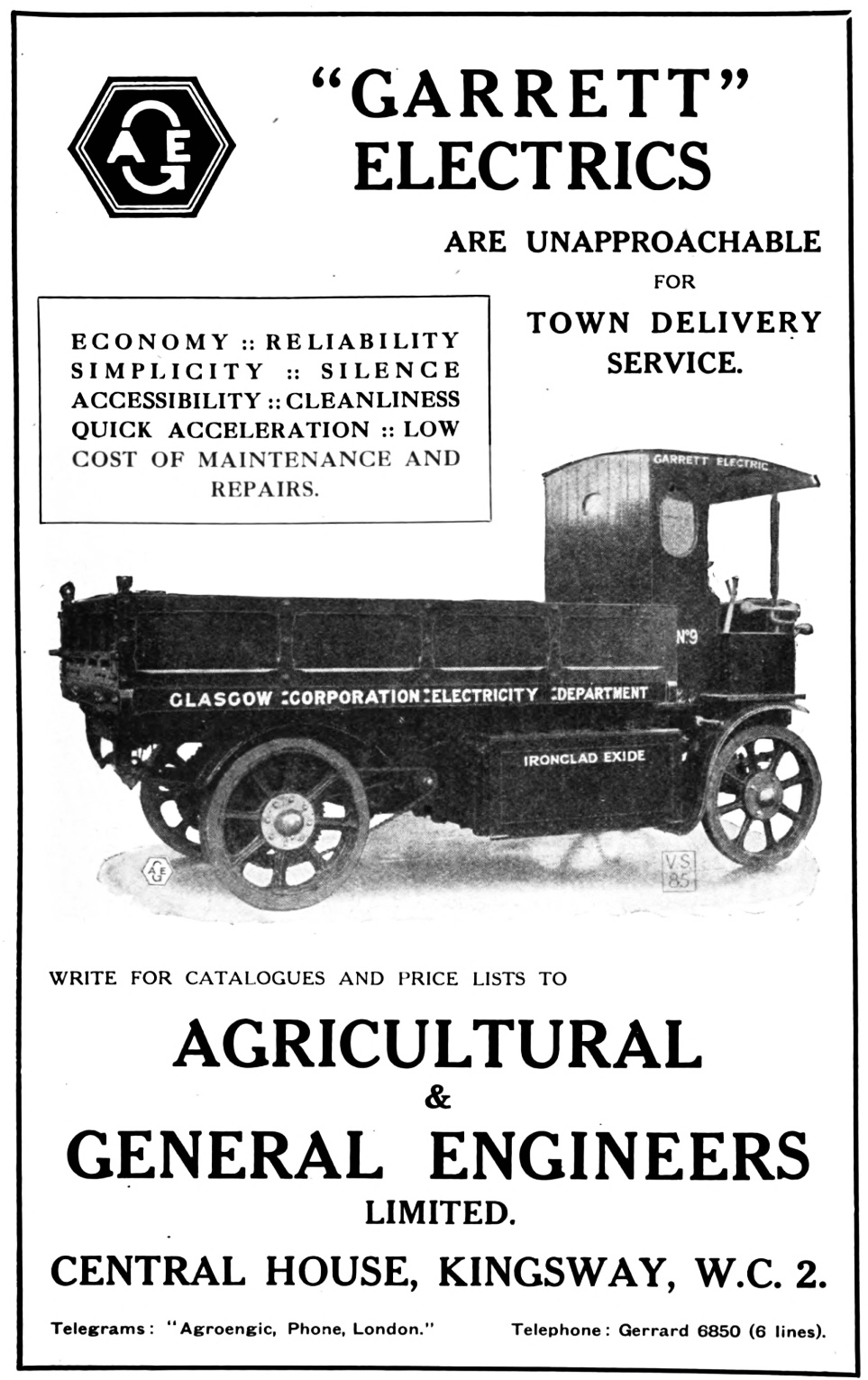
Garrett Electrics advertisement (1920)

Garrett began to look at whether there was a market for electric vehicles in 1912, and having decided that they were ideally suited for certain types of work, produced their first vehicle in 1913. This was a 3.5-ton battery-powered vehicle, intended for local deliveries.

Garrett obtained a patent, No.103,617 in 1916 for an interlocking device, that ensured that the current to the motor of an electric vehicle was disconnected automatically when the brakes were applied, and that ensured the vehicle could not be driven away with the handbrake still applied. One of their first electric vehicles was bought by the Great Eastern Railway, and worked at Norwich. It had an 8 hp (6.0 kW) motor, which was fully enclosed and mounted in front of the rear axle. This was connected to a differential cross shaft by chains running in an oil bath, which was in turn connected to the rear axle by two roller chains. The batteries were mounted below the chassis, to the rear of the driver's seat, while the control system included the patented interlock, providing six forward speeds and four in reverse. The range of the vehicle was between 35 and 40 miles (56 and 64 km) on a single charge, at speeds of 9 to 10 miles per hour (14 to 16 km/h). In 1917 Garrett also made a smaller 2.5-ton model, of a similar design.

With the end of the First World War, many manufacturing companies found themselves freed from their contracts for war supplies for the Ministry of Munitions, including Garrett, who announced in December 1918 that they could take orders again for their 3-ton and 5-ton steam wagons, as well as three types of electric vehicles, the 1.5-ton, 2.5-ton and 3.5-ton models. In January 1919, Lieut-Col F Garrett was appointed to be a representative of the manufacturers of electric vehicles on the Electric Vehicle Committee. At the Roads and Transport Congress held in 1919, Garrett displayed a 2.5-ton electric vehicle with an electrically operated end-tipping body. In a review of electric vehicle manufacturing in East Anglia, Commercial Motor noted that Garrett had experienced a period where it had been difficult to obtain sufficient motors and electrical equipment for their requirements, but that this had been alleviated by taking over a company making these components.

An assessment of the use of electric vehicles by municipalities in 1922 revealed that Garrett had supplied 33 of the 501 in use at the time. In an effort to combat the perception that electric vehicles were particularly slow, Garrett introduced a new chassis in 1922, which was designed for fast delivery work in towns. It was much lighter than previous models, though still able to carry loads of 1.5 to 2 tons, and had a range of around 45 miles (72 km) on a single charge. Commercial Motor noted that the speed was a great improvement on the previous heavy vehicles, but did not give any figures. A Garrett patent controller gave the vehicle eight forward speeds and seven in reverse, controlled by a foot pedal, while the motor was connected to a worm drive on the Timken-Detroit back axle by a carden shaft, rather than using chains. They must also have introduced some larger models, as they won a contract to supply ten 5-ton electric dustcarts to the Sheffield Corporation Cleansing Department in 1923, nine with chain drives, and one with a worm drive.

By the end of the year, they were advertising models carrying from 1.5 tons to 6 tons. The 2.5-ton, 3.5-ton and 5-ton models were each available with two lengths of chassis, with the shorter models able to be fitted with tipping bodies. In 1924 they obtained a patent, No.214,093, jointly with A E Collins of the City Engineers' Office, Norwich, for a system of extra controls, enabling the vehicle to be moved by the driver while he was walking beside it, which would be particularly useful for doorstep deliveries.

In 1926, Garrett won a contract to supply dustcarts to Glasgow Corporation, who were looking for a special design for collecting refuse from the tenements of Govan. Electric vehicles were needed, because much of the refuse was collected during the night. Garrett put a lot of effort into producing a suitable vehicle, which became known as the model GTZ. To make them more manoeuvrable, the front wheels were located behind the cab, and the chassis was redesigned to produce a very low loading line, only 4 feet 8 inches (1.42 m) above the road surface. The batteries were fitted over the front axle, between the cab and the body. Because they were only ever likely to work out of the recycling plant at Govan, tipping gear was not fitted to each vehicle, but was instead built into the Govan plant. The first vehicle of a batch of 36 was completed on 25 February 1927, and proved successful, at Garret eventually supplied 54 GTZ units with solid tyres, and later a smaller batch fitted with pneumatic tyres. They continued to work in Glasgow until the GTZ system was phased out in 1964.

=== Trolleybuses ===
When Ipswich Corporation opened their first trolleybus route in 1923, Garrett and another local manufacturer, Ransomes, Sims & Jefferies both saw an opportunity, and decided to enter the trolleybus market. Garrett produced an experimental vehicle in February 1925, with a high straight chassis, solid tyres, and brakes on the rear wheels only. Another member of the Agricultural and General Engineers group, Bull Motors, supplied the 50 hp (37 kW) motor, while Garrett designed and built their own controller for it, operated by a foot pedal. The chassis was then despatched to Charles H Roe of Leeds, who fitted a 32-seat body with a central entrance, and proving trials were carried out on the systems at Leeds, Keighley and Bradford before the vehicle arrived back in Ipswich for extended trials on 16 July 1925. Ipswich kept it until March 1926, when deliveries of their order for 15 trolleybuses began. The bodywork was by Strachan & Brown, complete with 31 seats and dual entrances. The front entrance was designed to facilitate one-man operation, and the front wheels were set back behind it.

Garrett's second prototype was completed in time for the Commercial Motor Show at Olympia in November 1925. The chassis and floor level were lower, and Strachan & Brown fitted a 36-seat body with a central entrance. It was demonstrated on the Mexborough and Swinton system in December, and then ran trials on the Leeds system until November 1926, when it was bought by Bradford. Ipswich's vehicles had a wheelbase of 13 feet 6 inches (4.11 m) and solid wheels, but the Type O trolleybus was also offered with a wheelbase of 15 feet 6 inches (4.72 m) and there was an option of having pneumatic types on the shorter chassis. All had a controller manufactured by British Thomson-Houston. A fourth variation was offered, with a 57-seat double deck body, but no orders were received for this model. For the Commercial Motor Show in November 1927, they built a 3-axle Model OS, with double-deck bodywork which they had built themselves.

After the show, the vehicle was hired by Southend-on-Sea Corporation, and subsequently bought by them. Doncaster ordered four similar vehicles, but with 60-seat bodywork by Charles H. Roe, the first of which was tested on the Mexborough and Swinton system, while Southend ordered five more vehicles, with 60-seat bodyword built by Garrett. They produced a 52-page catalogue in May 1929, but the only order received was for three single-deck type O vehicles for Mexborough and Swinton. Building trolleybuses did not prove to be particularly profitable for Garrett, and they decided to withdraw from the market in late 1930. Their final sale was of a demonstrator which had been built to promote sales in Europe, which they converted to right hand drive and sold to Ipswich on 24 November 1931. During the five years in which they had been active in this field, they sold 101 trolleybuses.

=== Diesel wagons ===
Garrett were a pioneer in the construction of diesel-engined road vehicles, and their two 1928-built experimental Crude Oil Wagons, known as COWS in the works, are believed to be the first British-built wagons fitted with diesel engines from new. These vehicles were constructed using the chassis and running gear from the undertype wagon designs, one a four-wheeler and the other a six-wheeler, both fitted with a McLaren Benz engine.

The COWS proved the concept of a diesel wagon, and in 1930 the company embarked on designing a production vehicle. Due to the company being part of the AGE combine, the engine chosen for the design was a Blackstone's design, the BHV6. The first vehicle, designated the GB6, was completed in 1931 and a test programme was initiated. The venture was not successful, primarily due to the unreliability of the Blackstone engine, and the perilous economic state of the works at that time. After the company was bought by Beyer Peacock, a half-hearted attempt was made to market the design with a Gardner engine fitted, but no wagon was ever produced.

== Bibliography ==
- Lumb, Geoff (1995). British Trolleybuses, 1911-1972. Ian Allan Publishing. ISBN 978-0-7110-2347-5.
- Mulley, C; Higginson, M, eds. (2013). Companion to Road Passenger Transport History. Roads and Road Transport History Association.
- Whitehead, R.A. (1994). Garrett Wagons – Part 1: Pioneers & Overtypes. R.A.Whitehead & Partners. p. 144. ISBN 978-0-9508298-5-2.
- Whitehead, R.A. (1995). Garrett Wagons – Part 2: Undertypes. R.A.Whitehead & Partners. p. 144. ISBN 0-9508298-6-2.
- Whitehead, R.A. (1996). Garrett Wagons – Part 3: Electrics & Motors. R.A.Whitehead & Partners. p. 144. ISBN 0-9508298-7-0.
- Woods, Barrie C. (1998). Municipal Refuse Collection Vehicles. Trans-Pennine Publishing. ISBN 978-0-9521070-4-0.
