= List of closed railway stations in Norfolk =

This is a list of closed railway stations in Norfolk, England. There are also a number of heritage railway stations in Norfolk, which have been re-opened by preservation societies. The companies listed are the pre-1923 groupings.

List of closed Norfolk railway stations
Name on closure	Place	Opened	Closed to passengers	Railway company	Notes
Abbey & West Dereham	West Dereham	1 August 1882	22 September 1930	Great Eastern	
Aldeby	Aldeby	4 December 1854	2 November 1959	Great Eastern	
Ashwellthorpe	Ashwellthorpe	2 May 1881	10 September 1939	Great Eastern	
Attlebridge	Attlebridge	2 December 1882	2 March 1959	Midland & Great Northern	
Aylsham North	Aylsham	5 April 1883	2 March 1959	Midland & Great Northern	
Belton & Burgh	Belton	1 June 1859	2 November 1959	Great Eastern	
Bluestone	Oulton	5 April 1883	1 March 1916	Midland & Great Northern	
Boyces Bridge	Emneth Hungate	20 August 1883	2 January 1928	Upwell Tramway	
Burnham Market	Burnham Market	17 August 1866	2 June 1952	Great Eastern	
Buxton Lammas	Buxton Lammas	8 July 1879	15 September 1952	Great Eastern	There is a Buxton railway station on the Bure Valley Railway.
Burston	Burston	2 July 1849	7 November 1966	Great Eastern	
Caister-on-Sea	Caister-on-Sea	7 August 1877	2 March 1959	Midland & Great Northern	
Catfield	Catfield	17 January 1880	2 March 1959	Midland & Great Northern	
Cawston	Cawston	1 September 1880	15 September 1952	Great Eastern	
Clenchwarton	Clenchwarton	1 March 1866	2 March 1959	Midland & Great Northern	
Coltishall	Coltishall	8 July 1879	15 September 1952	Great Eastern	A Coltishall railway station is open on the Bure Valley Railway.
Corpusty & Saxthorpe	Corpusty	5 April 1883	2 March 1959	Midland & Great Northern	
County School	North Elmham	1 March 1884	5 October 1964	Great Eastern	Preserved by the Mid-Norfolk Railway
Cromer High	Cromer	26 March 1877	20 September 1954	Great Eastern	
Cromer Links Halt	Cromer	9 July 1923	7 April 1953	Norfolk and Suffolk	
Docking	Docking	17 August 1866	2 June 1952	Great Eastern	
Drayton	Drayton	2 December 1882	2 March 1959	Midland & Great Northern	
Denver	Denver	January 1847	22 September 1930	Great Eastern	
Dereham	East Dereham	15 February 1847	6 October 1969	Great Eastern	Preserved by the Mid-Norfolk Railway.
Dersingham	Dersingham	3 October 1862	5 May 1969	Great Eastern	
Ditchingham	Ditchingham	2 March 1863	5 January 1953	Great Eastern	
Dunham	Great Dunham	11 September 1848	9 September 1968	Great Eastern	
Earsham	Earsham	2 November 1860	5 January 1953	Great Eastern	
East Rudham	East Rudham	16 August 1880	2 March 1959	Midland & Great Northern	
East Winch	East Winch	27 October 1846	9 September 1968	Great Eastern	
Ellingham	Ellingham	2 March 1863	5 January 1953	Great Eastern	
Elmbridge	Elmbridge	20 August 1883	2 January 1928	Upwell Tramway	
Emneth	Emneth Hungate	1 March 1848	9 September 1968	Great Eastern	
Fakenham West	Fakenham	16 August 1880	2 March 1959	Midland & Great Northern	
Fakenham East	Fakenham	20 March 1849	5 October 1964	Great Eastern	
Felmingham	Felmingham	5 April 1883	2 March 1959	Midland & Great Northern	
Ferry		1 August 1866	2 March 1959	Midland & Great Northern	
Flordon	Flordon	12 December 1849	7 November 1966	Great Eastern	
Forncett	Forncett	12 December 1849	7 November 1966	Great Eastern	
Foulsham	Foulsham	1 May 1882	15 September 1952	Great Eastern	
Fransham	Great Fransham	11 September 1848	9 September 1968	Great Eastern	
Gayton Road	Gayton	1 July 1887	2 March 1959	Midland & Great Northern	
Geldeston	Geldeston	2 March 1863	5 January 1953	Great Eastern	
Gorleston	Gorleston	13 July 1903	4 May 1970	Norfolk and Suffolk	
Gorleston Links	Gorleston	July 1914	4 May 1970	Norfolk and Suffolk	
Gorleston North	Gorleston	13 July 1903	5 October 1942	Norfolk and Suffolk	
Great Ormesby	Ormesby St Margaret	7 August 1877	2 March 1959	Midland & Great Northern	
Grimston Road	Grimston	16 August 1879	2 March 1959	Midland & Great Northern	
Guestwick	Guestwick	19 January 1882	2 March 1959	Midland & Great Northern	
Haddiscoe	Haddiscoe	1 July 1847	9 May 1904	Great Eastern	Replaced in 1904 by the modern Haddiscoe railway station.
Haddiscoe High Level	Haddiscoe	1 June 1859	2 November 1959	Great Eastern	
Hardingham	Hardingham	15 February 1847	6 October 1969	Great Eastern	Now part of the Mid Norfolk Railway
Harleston	Harleston	1 December 1855	5 January 1953	Great Eastern	
Heacham	Heacham	3 October 1862	5 May 1969	Great Eastern	
Hellesdon	Hellesdon	2 December 1882	15 September 1952	Midland & Great Northern	
Hemsby	Hemsby	16 May 1878	2 March 1959	Midland & Great Northern	
Hethersett	Hethersett	30 July 1845	31 January 1966	Great Eastern	
Hilgay	Hilgay	25 October 1847	4 November 1963	Great Eastern	
Hillington	Hillington	16 August 1879	2 March 1959	Midland & Great Northern	
Hindolvestone	Hindolveston	19 January 1882	2 March 1959	Midland & Great Northern	
Holkham	Holkham	17 August 1866	2 June 1952	Great Eastern	
Holme Hale	Holme Hale	15 November 1875	15 June 1964	Great Eastern	
Holt	Holt	1 October 1884	6 April 1964	Midland & Great Northern	Nearby station on North Norfolk Railway opened in late 1980s
Homersfield	Homersfield	2 November 1860	5 January 1953	Great Eastern	
Honing	Honing	August 1882	2 March 1959	Midland & Great Northern	
Hopton	Hopton-on-Sea	13 July 1903	4 May 1970	Norfolk and Suffolk	
Hunstanton	Hunstanton	3 October 1862	5 May 1969	Great Eastern	
Kimberley Park	Kimberley	15 February 1847	6 October 1969	Great Eastern Railway	Preserved by the Mid Norfolk Railway
Lenwade	Lenwade	1 July 1882	2 March 1959	Midland & Great Northern	
Martham	Martham	15 July 1878	2 March 1959	Midland & Great Northern	
Massingham	Massingham	16 August 1879	2 March 1959	Midland & Great Northern	
Melton Constable	Melton Constable	19 January 1882	6 April 1964	Midland & Great Northern	Site of major engineering works.
Middleton Towers	Middleton	27 October 1846	9 September 1968	Great Eastern	
Middle Drove	Marshland St James	1 March 1848	9 September 1968	Great Eastern	
Mundesley	Mundesley	1 July 1898	5 October 1964	Norfolk and Suffolk	
Narborough & Pentney	Narborough	27 October 1846	9 September 1968	Great Eastern	
Newtown Halt	Great Yarmouth	17 July 1933	2 March 1959	Midland & Great Northern	
North Elmham	North Elmham	20 March 1849	5 October 1964	Great Eastern	Preserved by the Mid-Norfolk Railway
North Walsham Town	North Walsham	13 June 1881	2 March 1959	Midland & Great Northern	
North Wootton	North Wootton	3 October 1862	5 May 1969	Great Eastern	
Norwich City	Norwich	2 December 1882	2 March 1959	Midland & Great Northern	
Norwich Victoria	Norwich	12 December 1849	22 May 1916	Great Eastern	
Overstrand	Overstrand	3 August 1906	7 April 1953	Norfolk & Suffolk	
Paston & Knapton	Paston	1 July 1898	5 October 1964	Norfolk and Suffolk	
Potter Heigham	Potter Heigham	17 January 1880	2 March 1959	Midland & Great Northern	
Pulham Market	Pulham Market	1 December 1855	5 January 1953	Great Eastern	
Pulham St Mary	Pulham St Mary	1 December 1855	5 January 1953	Great Eastern	
Raynham Park	West Raynham	16 August 1880	2 March 1959	Midland & Great Northern	
Redenhall	Redenhall	January 1861	1 August 1866	Great Eastern	
Reepham	Reepham	2 May 1881	15 September 1952	Great Eastern	
Roudham Junction	Roudham	30 July 1845	1 May 1932	Great Eastern	
Ryburgh	Ryburgh	20 March 1849	5 October 1964	Great Eastern	
Ryston	Ryston	1 August 1882	22 September 1930	Great Eastern	
Sedgeford	Sedgeford	17 August 1866	2 June 1952	Great Eastern	
Sheringham	Sheringham	16 June 1887	2 January 1967	Midland & Great Northern	Preserved by the North Norfolk Railway
Sidestrand Halt	Sidestrand	25 May 1936	7 April 1953	Norfolk and Suffolk Joint Railway	
Smeeth Road	Smeeth	1 March 1848	9 September 1968	Great Eastern	
Snettisham	Snettisham	3 October 1862	5 May 1969	Great Eastern	
South Lynn	King's Lynn	1 January 1886	2 March 1959	Midland & Great Northern	
Spinks Lane	Wymondham	30 July 1845	November 1845	Great Eastern	Closed after a few months.
St Olaves	St. Olaves	1 June 1859	2 November 1959	Great Eastern	
Stanhoe	Stanhoe	17 August 1866	2 June 1952	Great Eastern	
Stalham	Stalham	3 July 1880	2 March 1959	Midland & Great Northern	
Starston	Starston	1 December 1855	1 August 1866	Great Eastern	
Stoke Ferry	Stoke Ferry	1 August 1882	22 September 1930	Great Eastern	
Stow Bardolph	Stow Bardolph	27 October 1846	4 November 1963	Great Eastern	
Stow Bedon	Stow Bedon	18 October 1869	16 June 1964	Great Eastern	
Swaffham	Swaffham	10 August 1847	9 September 1968	Great Eastern	
Swainsthorpe	Swainsthorpe	March 1850	5 July 1954	Great Eastern	
Terrington	Terrington	1 March 1866	2 March 1959	Midland & Great Northern	
Thetford Bridge	Thetford	15 November 1875	8 June 1953	Great Eastern	
Thursford	Thursford	19 January 1882	2 March 1959	Midland & Great Northern	
Thuxton	Thuxton	15 February 1847	6 October 1969	Great Eastern	Preserved as part of the Mid-Norfolk Railway.
Tivetshall	Tivetshall	12 December 1849	7 November 1966	Great Eastern	
Trimingham	Trimingham	3 August 1906	7 April 1953	Norfolk and Suffolk	
Trowse	Norwich	15 December 1845	5 September 1939	Great Eastern	Briefly re-opened in 1986 while Norwich was renovated.
Upwell	Upwell	8 September 1884	2 January 1928	Upwell Tramway	
Walpole	Walpole	1 March 1866	2 March 1959	Midland & Great Northern	
Walsingham	Walsingham	1 December 1857	5 October 1964	Great Eastern	
Watton	Watton	18 October 1869	15 June 1964	Great Eastern	
Wells-next-the-Sea	Wells-next-the-Sea	1 December 1857	5 October 1964	Great Eastern	
Wendling	Wendling	11 September 1848	9 September 1968	Great Eastern	
Weybourne	Weybourne	1 July 1901	6 April 1964	Midland & Great Northern	Preserved by the North Norfolk Railway
Whitlingham	Whitlingham	20 October 1874	19 September 1955	Great Eastern	
Whitwell & Reepham	Reepham	1 July 1882	2 March 1959	Midland & Great Northern	Preserved by the Whitwell & Reepham Preservation Society
Wighton Halt	Wighton		5 October 1964	Great Eastern	Preserved by the Wells and Walsingham
Wolferton	Wolferton	3 October 1862	5 May 1969	Great Eastern	
Wortwell	Wortwell	1 December 1855	1 January 1878	Great Eastern	
Wretham & Hockham	Wretham	18 October 1869	15 June 1964	Great Eastern	
Yarmouth Beach	Great Yarmouth	7 August 1877	2 March 1959	Midland & Great Northern	
Yarmouth South Town	Great Yarmouth	1 June 1859	4 May 1970	Norfolk and Suffolk	
Yaxham	Yaxham	15 February 1847	6 October 1969	Great Eastern Railway	Preserved by the Mid Norfolk Railway

== Goods stations ==
Goods only stations
Name on closure	Place	Opened	Closed	Railway company
Hardwick Road	King's Lynn			Midland & Great Northern
Langor Bridge	Fakenham			Midland & Great Northern
Wells Harbour	Wells-next-the-Sea			Wells & Fakenham

== See also ==
- Railways in Norfolk
