= Alburgh =

Village in Norfolk, England

Coordinates: 52.434°N 1.334°E

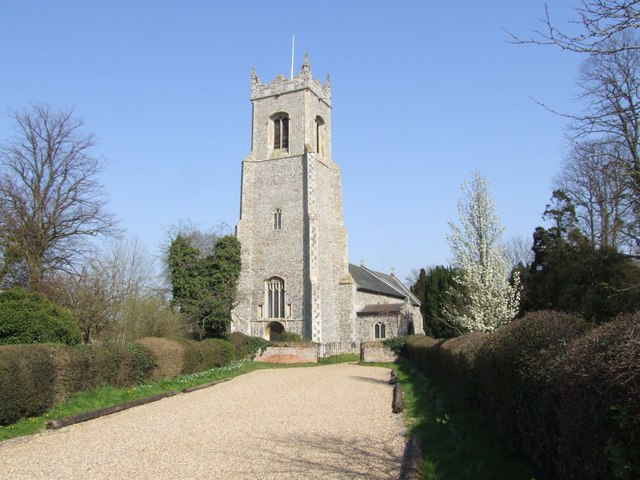
- All Saints Church

- Location within Norfolk
- Area: 6.42 km^{2} (2.48 sq mi)
- Population: 409 (2021 census)
  - Density: 64/km^{2} (170/sq mi)
- OS grid reference: TM267870
- District: South Norfolk
- Shire county: Norfolk
- Region: East
- Country: England
- Sovereign state: United Kingdom
- Post town: HARLESTON
- Postcode district: IP20
- Dialling code: 01986
- UK Parliament: Waveney Valley

Alburgh is a village and civil parish in the South Norfolk district of the English county of Norfolk. It is about 4 miles (6.4 km) north-east of Harleston and 16 miles (26 km) south of Norwich. The parish is on the border with Suffolk along the River Waveney.

== History ==
The earliest evidence of settlement in the parish is from the Mesolithic and Neolithic eras, with a number of flint tools having been recovered. A barrow dating from the Bronze Age was excavated in the 19th century, with human bones reportedly discovered. The village name, which is thought to mean "old mound or hill" or "mound or hill belonging to Alda", may derive from this.

Despite little archaeological evidence from the Iron Age, Roman, or Saxon periods, the village is listed in the Domesday Book as a settlement of 33 households in the hundred of Earsham. It was divided between the estates of King William I, Count Alan of Brittany and Eudo, son of Spirewic.

During the medieval period Holbrook Hall, a moated manor house, was built in the south of the parish. It was demolished in 1570 after Gawdy Hall was built further north. A series of earthworks remain. A number of buildings in the parish, including Alburgh Hall and Church Farm, date to the 16th century.

Agriculture enclosure at the start of the 19th century led to changes in the pattern of settlement in the parish, and the village is now a north–south linear settlement along the road linking Wortwell with Topcroft.

== Governance ==
The parish is in the district of South Norfolk. It is part of the Ditchingham and Earsham ward. It falls within the Clavering Division of Norfolk County Council. Prior to the 2024 general election the parish had been part of the South Norfolk parliamentary constituency for over 100 years. It is now part of the newly formed Waveney Valley constituency.

== Geography ==
The parish has an area of 6.418 square kilometres (2.478 sq mi) and at the 2021 census had a population of 409. This had risen from 349 at the 2001 census.

The parish borders the River Waveney to the south, marking the county boundary with Suffolk. Neighbouring parishes include Redenhall with Harleston, Shelton and Hardwick, Wortwell, Topcroft, Hempnall, and Denton in Norfolk, and the Suffolk parish of Homersfield. The A143 road between Great Yarmouth and Bury St Edmunds runs through the south of the parish, following the line of the former Waveney Valley railway line.

The railway line, which linked the Great Eastern Main Line at Tivetshall with the East Suffolk line at Beccles, operated from 1855 until its closure in 1966. Homersfield railway station which served the Suffolk village of the same name, was located in Alburgh, close the parish boundary with Wortwell. It opened in 1860 and closed to passengers in 1953 and to freight in 1960.

Homersfield Bridge, a 50 feet (15 m) span bridge across the Waveney, was built in 1870 by the Adair estate. It is the oldest surviving concrete bridge in Britain. A replacement bridge was built in 1970 just to the east and the bridge is now open only to pedestrians and cycles. It was restored during the 1990s.

== Amenities ==
Alburgh with Denton Church of England Primary Academy is located in the village. It educates children aged between the ages of 4 and 11 and is part of St. Benet's Multi-Academy Trust. Around 100 children attend the school.

The village hall and playing field is used for a variety of events, including by village tennis and badminton clubs. The village had two pubs and at least two beerhouses, all of which have now closed. The Kings Head closed in 1956 and the Tradesmans Arms in 1999 before being demolished in 2001. Grain Brewery, which operates a taproom, is based at South Farm in the parish.

== Religion ==
Parts of the parish church, which is dedicated to All Saints, date to the 13th or 14th century. The porch was constructed after a 1463 bequest, the tower is from 15th century and the interior includes a rood screen from the same period which was restored in 1988. The church architect Richard Phipson restored it in 1876, adding "pinnacles with little flying buttresses" and reworking the chancel. The building is Grade I listed and is part of the Earsham and Ditchingham benefice. Its ring of eight bells is among Norfolk's oldest.

The churchyard is a conservation area managed by the Norfolk Wildlife Trust. It includes a war memorial in the form of a stone cross. It lists 19 names from the First World War and five from the Second World War.

A former Methodist chapel was turned into a dwelling during the 1960s.
