= St John the Baptist Church, Harleston =

Church in Norfolk, England

St John the Baptist Church
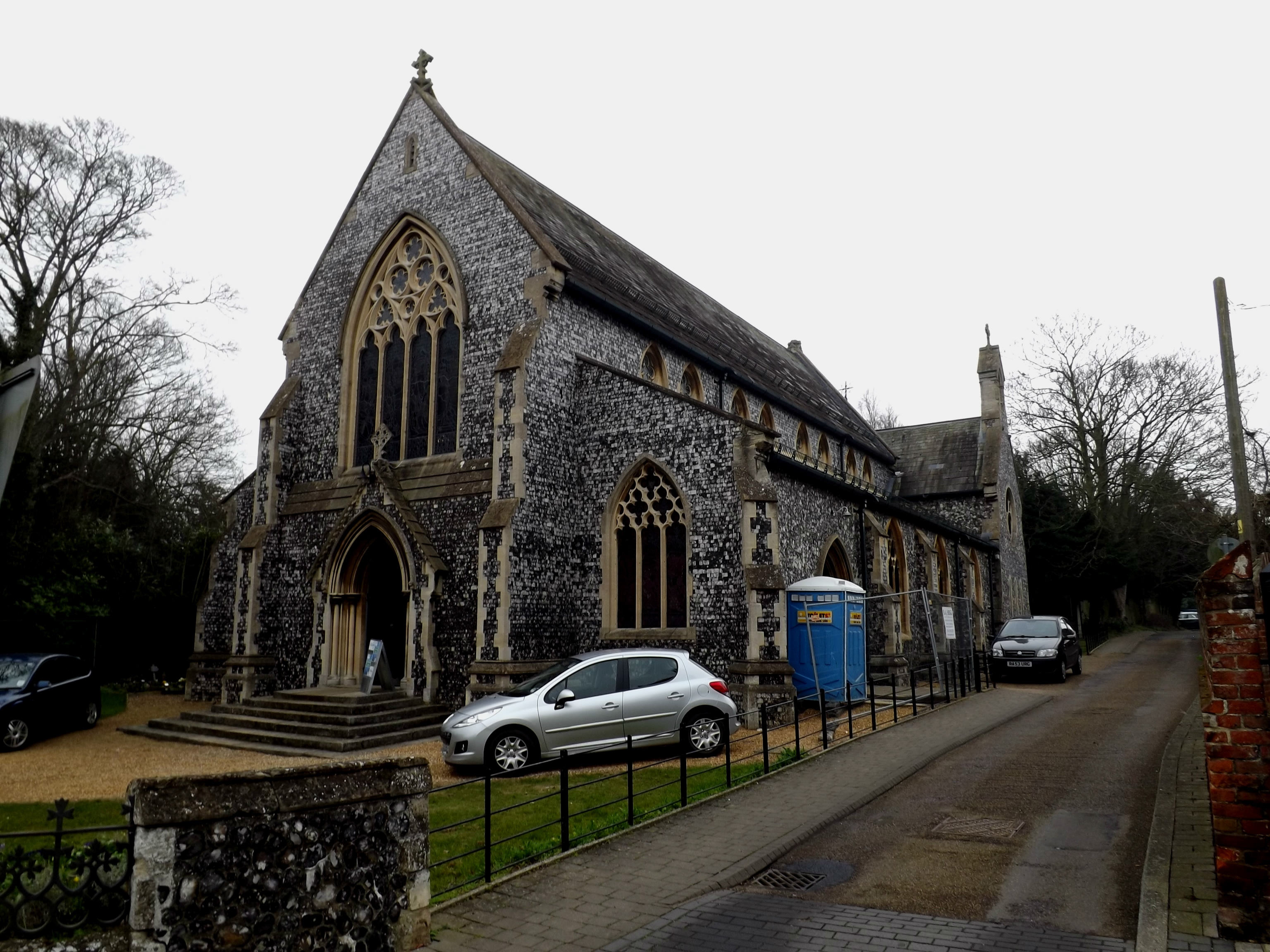
- The church in 2015
- St John the Baptist Church
- 52.40227°N 1.30085°E
- OS grid reference: TM 24640 83377
- Location: Harleston, Norfolk
- Country: England
- Denomination: Church of England
- Website: 7churches.org.uk/harleston

Architecture
- Heritage designation: Grade II Listed Building
- Designated: 26 November 1976
- Architect: R. M. Phipson
- Style: Gothic
- Completed: 1872

Administration
- Parish: Redenhall with Harleston

St John the Baptist Church is a place of worship in Harleston, Norfolk, England in the parish of Redenhall with Harleston. Located on Broad Street, St John's is a Grade II listed building. It is one of the seven churches that make up the collective Benefice of Redenhall with Scole, which are located across the Waveney Valley. The church caught fire in 2025 and as of December 2025 is undergoing restoration work.

== History ==
The church was built in 1872 by R. M. Phipson. Harleston, which has existed since the 13th century, did not have a large church of its own up to this point, and as such St John's is a chapel of ease. Its stained glass was from a single commission from the O'Connors. In 2010, the church underwent conservation work. By 2025, it was being used as a community hub, and Waveney food bank operated there.

=== 2025 fire ===
On 1 October 2025, the church caught fire, causing significant internal damage, though firefighters saved a lot of its structure and kept the roof intact. One window near the kitchen was "blown out" by the heat of the fire. An investigation found the fire was accidental and had begun in the church's kitchen. The stock held by Waveney food bank was destroyed, as were its means to organise its distribution such as its tablets.

Waveney food bank was relocated into the Methodist Church on London Road, and East of England Co-operative Society donated £1,000 to help it regain its stock. The church's services were moved to St Thomas More on Jays Green in the town. In November a benefice administrator said repairs could take up to three years to complete and stated that while the outside didn't "look too bad", the inside was in a "very bad state"; plaster had come off the wall, and mould was appearing due to the water from the fire brigade. The church's pews as well as the lectern and other furniture were removed on 18 November to be cleaned and repaired. Its large stained glass window was taken to a specialist, Devlin Plummer, for repairs. In December, those working on its restoration under architect Ruth Brennan said this would likely take up to two years, costing "hundreds of thousands of pounds". Repair costs are expected to be funded by insurance.

== Architecture ==
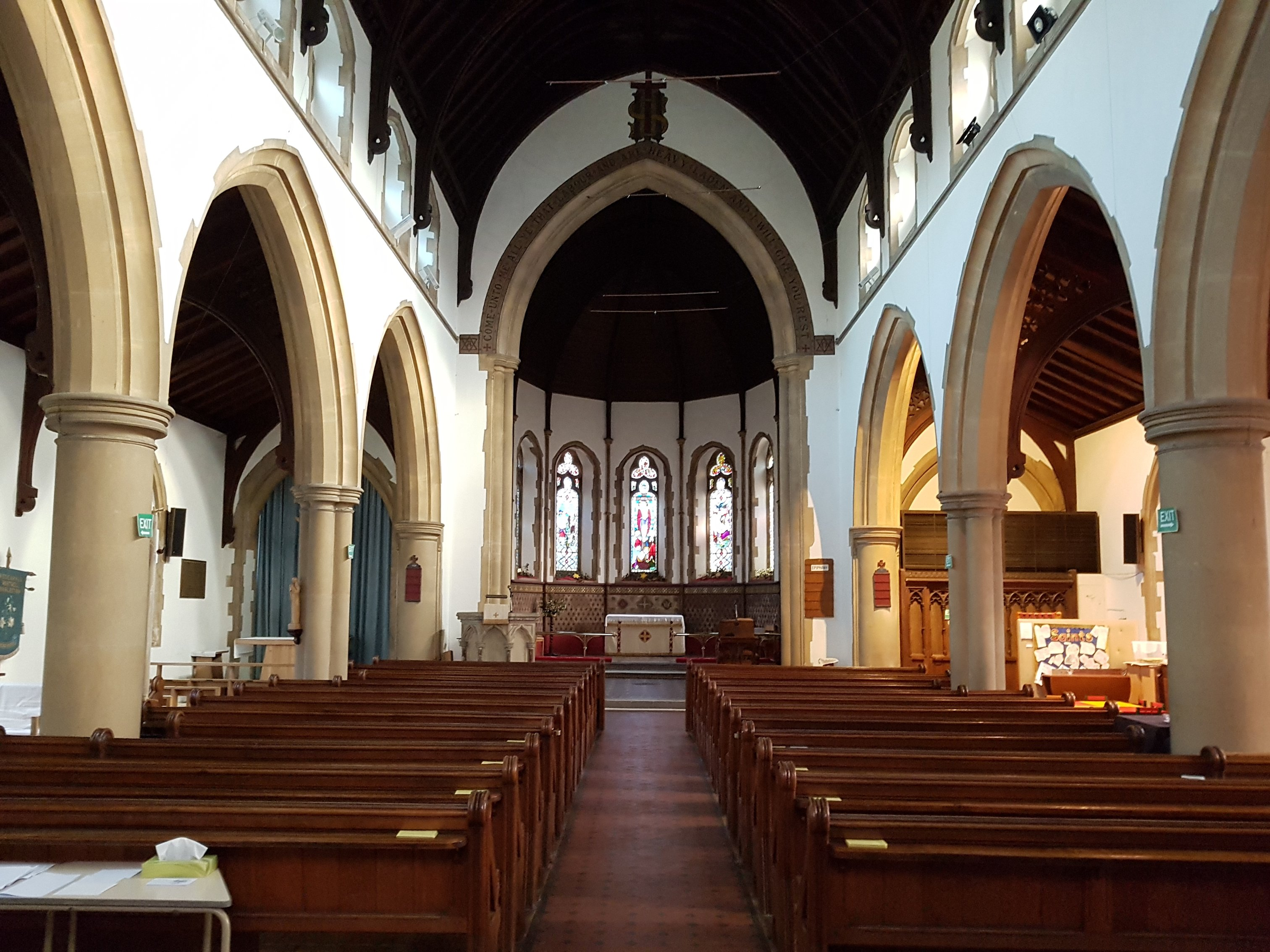
Interior of the church in 2018

The church is in a gothic style, and is made of flint with stone dressings. It features a steep slated roof, a nave with a clerestory, north and south aisles, and a chancel with polygonal apse. It has north and south transepts, with the south transept including a stone bellcote. There is a large traceried west window, and a portal below with a moulded arch. At least prior to 2025, most of the O'Connors glass remained, with the west window of original glass being restored in 2010. Some modern stained glass depicted the local landscape and the church's patron.

== See also ==
- Church of the Assumption of the Blessed Virgin Mary, Redenhall
- Media related to St John the Baptist's church, Harleston, Norfolk at Wikimedia Commons
