= Listed buildings in Redenhall with Harleston =

Historic structures in Norfolk, England

Redenhall with Harleston is a civil parish comprising the town of Harleston and the neighbouring village of Redenhall in the South Norfolk district of Norfolk, England. It contains 146 listed buildings that are recorded in the National Heritage List for England. Of these one is grade I, four are grade II* and 141 are grade II.

This list is based on the information retrieved online from Historic England.

== Key ==
Grade	Criteria
I	Buildings that are of exceptional interest
II*	Particularly important buildings of more than special interest
II	Buildings that are of special interest

== Listing ==
Name	Grade	Location	Type	Completed (Note: The date given is the date used by Historic England as significant for the initial building or that of an important part in the structure's description.)	Date designated	Grid ref. (Note: The grid reference is based on the British national grid reference system, sometimes known as OSGB36, used by the Ordnance Survey.) Geo-coordinates	Notes	Entry number (Note: The "List Entry Number" is a unique number assigned to each listed building and scheduled monument by Historic England.)	Image	Wikidata
1, Briar Walk	II	1, Briar Walk, Harleston			26 November 1976	TM2461983298; 52°24′06″N 1°18′02″E		1303278	Upload Photo	Q26590363
The Delft House	II	2 and 4, Briar Walk, Harleston			26 November 1976	TM2460983288; 52°24′05″N 1°18′01″E		1303086	Upload Photo	Q26590191
3 and 5, Broad Street	II	3 and 5, Broad Street, Harleston			26 November 1976	TM2457483374; 52°24′08″N 1°18′00″E		1050187	Upload Photo	Q26302172
9, Broad Street	II	9, Broad Street, Harleston			26 November 1976	TM2459183396; 52°24′09″N 1°18′01″E		1050144	Upload Photo	Q26302128
11, Broad Street	II	11, Broad Street, Harleston			26 November 1976	TM2459183403; 52°24′09″N 1°18′01″E		1050145	Upload Photo	Q26302129
17, Old Market Place (see Details for Further Address Information)	II	12, Broad Street, Harleston			26 November 1976	TM2459083349; 52°24′07″N 1°18′00″E		1050149	Upload Photo	Q26302133
14, 16 and 18, Broad Street	II	14, 16 and 18, Broad Street, Harleston			26 November 1976	TM2464283444; 52°24′10″N 1°18′03″E		1373350	Upload Photo	Q26654345
15 and 17, Broad Street	II	15 and 17, Broad Street, Harleston			26 November 1976	TM2460183422; 52°24′10″N 1°18′01″E		1373346	Upload Photo	Q26654341
19, Broad Street	II	19, Broad Street, Harleston			26 November 1976	TM2461183451; 52°24′11″N 1°18′02″E		1050146	Upload Photo	Q26302130
20, 22 and 24, Broad Street	II	20, 22 and 24, Broad Street, Harleston			26 November 1976	TM2464483464; 52°24′11″N 1°18′03″E		1155640	Upload Photo	Q26449103
21, Broad Street	II	21, Broad Street, Harleston			26 November 1976	TM2461883463; 52°24′11″N 1°18′02″E		1050147	Upload Photo	Q26302131
23, Broad Street	II	23, Broad Street, Harleston			26 November 1976	TM2461983468; 52°24′11″N 1°18′02″E		1373347	Upload Photo	Q26654342
25, Broad Street	II	25, Broad Street, Harleston			26 November 1976	TM2462683476; 52°24′11″N 1°18′03″E		1050148	Upload Photo	Q26302132
26 and 28, Broad Street	II	26 and 28, Broad Street, Harleston			26 November 1976	TM2464783484; 52°24′12″N 1°18′04″E		1050152	Upload Photo	Q26302136
27 and 29, Broad Street	II	27 and 29, Broad Street, Harleston			26 November 1976	TM2463183495; 52°24′12″N 1°18′03″E		1373348	Upload Photo	Q26654343
30 and 32, Broad Street	II	30 and 32, Broad Street, Harleston			26 November 1976	TM2464983502; 52°24′12″N 1°18′04″E		1155645	Upload Photo	Q26449108
Caltofts	II	Broad Street, Harleston			26 November 1976	TM2466983405; 52°24′09″N 1°18′05″E		1050151	Upload Photo	Q26302135
Church of St John the Baptist	II	Broad Street, Harleston	church building		26 November 1976	TM2464083377; 52°24′08″N 1°18′03″E		1373349	Church of St John the Baptist More images	Q26654344
Churchyard Wall in Front and West of Church of St John	II	Broad Street, Harleston			26 November 1976	TM2461183389; 52°24′09″N 1°18′02″E		1155633	Upload Photo	Q26449093
Old Bank House	II	Broad Street, Harleston			7 December 1959	TM2461483361; 52°24′08″N 1°18′02″E		1050150	Upload Photo	Q26302134
Pair of K6 Telephone Kiosks	II	Broad Street			5 October 1987	TM2461383398; 52°24′09″N 1°18′02″E		1050776	Upload Photo	Q26302713
Nut Tree Farmhouse	II	Bungaygrave Lane			26 November 1976	TM2430588536; 52°26′55″N 1°17′58″E		1050186	Upload Photo	Q26302171
Tower House	II	1 and 1a, Church Street, Harleston			26 November 1976	TM2453683324; 52°24′07″N 1°17′57″E		1050122	Upload Photo	Q26302105
5, Church Street	II	5, Church Street, Harleston			26 November 1976	TM2456383340; 52°24′07″N 1°17′59″E		1050153	Upload Photo	Q26302137
6, Church Street	II	6, Church Street, Harleston			26 November 1976	TM2457683328; 52°24′07″N 1°18′00″E		1155725	Upload Photo	Q26449223
7, Church Street	II	7, Church Street, Harleston			26 November 1976	TM2456883349; 52°24′07″N 1°17′59″E		1303254	Upload Photo	Q26590344
8, Church Street	II	8, Church Street			26 November 1976	TM2458183338; 52°24′07″N 1°18′00″E		1373352	Upload Photo	Q26654347
9, Church Street	II	9, Church Street, Harleston			26 November 1976	TM2457583358; 52°24′08″N 1°18′00″E		1373351	Upload Photo	Q26654346
10, Church Street	II	10, Church Street, Harleston			26 November 1976	TM2458583344; 52°24′07″N 1°18′00″E		1050155	Upload Photo	Q26302140
Lantern Cottage	II	4b, Church Street, Harleston			26 November 1976	TM2457083322; 52°24′06″N 1°17′59″E		1050154	Upload Photo	Q26302139
Market House	II	4a, Church Street			26 November 1976	TM2456583317; 52°24′06″N 1°17′59″E		1155720	Upload Photo	Q26449215
6 and 8, Exchange Street	II	6 and 8, Exchange Street			26 November 1976	TM2454483296; 52°24′06″N 1°17′58″E		1050156	Upload Photo	Q26302141
9, Exchange Street	II	9, Exchange Street, Harleston			26 November 1976	TM2453983269; 52°24′05″N 1°17′57″E		1303183	Upload Photo	Q26590280
Corn Exchange	II	Exchange Street, Harleston	corn exchange		26 November 1976	TM2455383272; 52°24′05″N 1°17′58″E		1303219	Corn Exchange More images	Q26590314
Public Conveniences Immediately West of Corn Exchange	II	Exchange Street, Harleston			26 November 1976	TM2454683276; 52°24′05″N 1°17′58″E		1373313	Upload Photo	Q26654308
10 Market Place	II	10 Market Place, Harleston, IP20 9AD			26 November 1976	TM2454383304; 52°24′06″N 1°17′58″E		1050123	Upload Photo	Q26302106
28 and 30 the Thoroughfare	II	28 and 30 The Thoroughfare, IP20 9AU, Harleston			26 November 1976	TM2460283442; 52°24′10″N 1°18′01″E		1154249	Upload Photo	Q26447291
Harleston United Reformed Church and Church Hall	II	Harleston, IP20 9DE			4 April 2017	TM2456083204; 52°24′03″N 1°17′58″E		1444399	Upload Photo	Q66478625
Harleston War Memorial	II	Harleston, IP20 9AZ	war memorial		10 April 2017	TM2462383412; 52°24′09″N 1°18′02″E		1445129	Harleston War Memorial More images	Q66478691
1, Keeley's Yard	II	1, Keeley's Yard, Harleston			26 November 1976	TM2461683269; 52°24′05″N 1°18′02″E		1050157	Upload Photo	Q26302142
Building Adjoining and Immediately East of No 1	II	Keeley's Yard, Harleston			26 November 1976	TM2462483268; 52°24′05″N 1°18′02″E		1155739	Upload Photo	Q26449240
1, London Road	II	1, London Road, Harleston			26 November 1976	TM2448183265; 52°24′05″N 1°17′54″E		1373314	Upload Photo	Q26654309
Selbourne House	II	2, London Road, Harleston			26 November 1976	TM2446883304; 52°24′06″N 1°17′54″E		1155772	Upload Photo	Q26449283
3, London Road	II	3, London Road, Harleston			26 November 1976	TM2447683256; 52°24′04″N 1°17′54″E		1303186	Upload Photo	Q26590283
4, 6 and 8, London Road	II	4, 6 and 8, London Road			26 November 1976	TM2446483272; 52°24′05″N 1°17′53″E		1050161	Upload Photo	Q26302146
5, London Road	II	5, London Road, Harleston			26 November 1976	TM2447083243; 52°24′04″N 1°17′54″E		1050158	Upload Photo	Q26302143
9, London Road	II	9, London Road, Harleston			26 November 1976	TM2445283210; 52°24′03″N 1°17′53″E		1373315	Upload Photo	Q26654310
10 and 12, London Road	II	10 and 12, London Road, Harleston			26 November 1976	TM2445083253; 52°24′04″N 1°17′53″E		1155784	Upload Photo	Q26449299
St George's House	II	11, London Road, Harleston			26 November 1976	TM2444883203; 52°24′03″N 1°17′52″E		1155755	Upload Photo	Q26449262
15, London Road	II	15, London Road, Harleston			26 November 1976	TM2442683161; 52°24′02″N 1°17′51″E		1303194	Upload Photo	Q26590291
16 and 18, London Road	II	16 and 18, London Road, Harleston			26 November 1976	TM2442983217; 52°24′03″N 1°17′52″E		1050162	Upload Photo	Q26302147
17, London Road	II	17, London Road, Harleston			26 November 1976	TM2441683151; 52°24′01″N 1°17′51″E		1050160	Upload Photo	Q26302145
20, 22 and 24, London Road	II	20, 22 and 24, London Road, Harleston			26 November 1976	TM2442383207; 52°24′03″N 1°17′51″E		1050163	Upload Photo	Q26302148
58 and 60, London Road	II	58 and 60, London Road, Harleston			26 November 1976	TM2431082984; 52°23′56″N 1°17′45″E		1303167	Upload Photo	Q26590264
Gothic Cottage	II	London Road, Harleston			26 November 1976	TM2419982771; 52°23′49″N 1°17′38″E		1050164	Upload Photo	Q26302150
The Beeches	II	London Road, Harleston			26 November 1976	TM2444883161; 52°24′01″N 1°17′52″E		1050159	Upload Photo	Q26302144
1, 3 and 5, Market Place	II	1, 3 and 5, Market Place, Harleston			26 November 1976	TM2449683312; 52°24′06″N 1°17′55″E		1050165	Upload Photo	Q26302151
Magpie Hotel and Stables Adjoining East	II	Market Place, Harleston			11 September 1951	TM2450683289; 52°24′06″N 1°17′56″E		1050124	Upload Photo	Q26302107
1 and 3, Mendham Lane	II	1 and 3, Mendham Lane, Harleston			26 November 1976	TM2459083257; 52°24′04″N 1°18′00″E		1373336	Upload Photo	Q26654331
Griffons	II	15, Mendham Lane, Harleston			26 November 1976	TM2458683223; 52°24′03″N 1°18′00″E		1050125	Upload Photo	Q26302108
The Chestnuts	II	Mendham Lane, Harleston			26 November 1976	TM2455583190; 52°24′02″N 1°17′58″E		1373337	Upload Photo	Q26654332
Bethel Farmhouse	II	Mendham Low Road, Harleston			26 November 1976	TM2639582482; 52°23′37″N 1°19′34″E		1050126	Upload Photo	Q26302109
Freston House	II	Mendham Low Road, Harleston			26 November 1976	TM2670683110; 52°23′56″N 1°19′52″E		1050127	Upload Photo	Q26302110
Hill Farmhouse	II	Mendham Low Road, Harleston			26 November 1976	TM2656882892; 52°23′50″N 1°19′44″E		1373338	Upload Photo	Q26654333
2 and 4 Old Chapel Yard	II	2 and 4, Old Chapel Yard, Harleston, IP20 9AJ			26 November 1976	TM2449583366; 52°24′08″N 1°17′55″E		1050128	Upload Photo	Q26302111
6 and 8, Old Chapel Yard	II	6 and 8, Old Chapel Yard, Harleston, IP20 9AJ			26 November 1976	TM2447883370; 52°24′08″N 1°17′54″E		1373339	Upload Photo	Q26654334
3 and 5, Old Market Place	II	3 and 5, Old Market Place, Harleston			26 November 1976	TM2458183302; 52°24′06″N 1°18′00″E		1155895	Upload Photo	Q26449453
4 and 6, Old Market Place	II	4 and 6, Old Market Place, Harleston			7 December 1959	TM2459983276; 52°24′05″N 1°18′01″E		1373341	Upload Photo	Q26654336
7 and 9, Old Market Place	II	7 and 9, Old Market Place, Harleston			26 November 1976	TM2458783311; 52°24′06″N 1°18′00″E		1050130	Upload Photo	Q26302114
10 and 12, Old Market Place	II	10 and 12, Old Market Place, Harleston			26 November 1976	TM2460483302; 52°24′06″N 1°18′01″E		1050132	Upload Photo	Q26302116
11, Old Market Place	II	11, Old Market Place, Harleston			26 November 1976	TM2458883326; 52°24′07″N 1°18′00″E		1155908	Upload Photo	Q26449472
14, Old Market Place	II	14, Old Market Place, Harleston			26 November 1976	TM2460883314; 52°24′06″N 1°18′01″E		1373342	Upload Photo	Q26654337
Ilford Cottage	II	15, Old Market Place, Harleston			26 November 1976	TM2459183333; 52°24′07″N 1°18′00″E		1050131	Upload Photo	Q26302115
16 and 18, Old Market Place	II*	16 and 18, Old Market Place, Harleston			26 November 1976	TM2461283322; 52°24′06″N 1°18′01″E		1303092	Upload Photo	Q17532668
20, 22 and 24, Old Market Place	II	20, 22 and 24, Old Market Place, Harleston			26 November 1976	TM2461683337; 52°24′07″N 1°18′02″E		1050133	Upload Photo	Q26302117
No 2 and Adjoining House to South	II	Old Market Place, Harleston			26 November 1976	TM2459283270; 52°24′05″N 1°18′00″E		1155920	Upload Photo	Q26449488
Post Office	II	Old Market Place, Harleston			3 August 1970	TM2457283287; 52°24′05″N 1°17′59″E		1373340	Upload Photo	Q26654335
Stables Immediately South of the Old House	II	Old Market Place, Harleston			26 November 1976	TM2457483233; 52°24′04″N 1°17′59″E		1155893	Upload Photo	Q26449450
The Old House	II	Old Market Place, Harleston			7 December 1959	TM2457483261; 52°24′05″N 1°17′59″E		1050129	Upload Photo	Q26302113
Laburnham House	II	Old Post Office Court, Harleston			26 November 1976	TM2451483389; 52°24′09″N 1°17′56″E		1155975	Upload Photo	Q26449564
The Malthouse	II	Recreation Walk, Harleston			26 November 1976	TM2439983304; 52°24′06″N 1°17′50″E		1373345	Upload Photo	Q26654340
Church of the Assumption of the Blessed Virgin Mary, Redenhall, with Northern Churchyard Walls and Gate Piers	I	Redenhall, Harleston, IP20 9QS, Wortwell	church building		7 December 1959	TM2639884379; 52°24′38″N 1°19′38″E		1050134	Church of the Assumption of the Blessed Virgin Mary, Redenhall, with Northern Churchyard Walls and Gate Piers More images	Q17537447
Clintergate Farmhouse	II	Redenhall			26 November 1976	TM2426887376; 52°26′18″N 1°17′53″E		1373343	Upload Photo	Q26654338
Coldham Hall	II	Redenhall			26 November 1976	TM2545186941; 52°26′02″N 1°18′55″E		1155998	Upload Photo	Q26449597
Jasmine Cottage	II	Redenhall			26 November 1976	TM2629784398; 52°24′39″N 1°19′33″E		1050135	Upload Photo	Q26302118
Pecks Farm Cottages	II	Redenhall			26 November 1976	TM2593285290; 52°25′08″N 1°19′16″E		1050136	Upload Photo	Q26302119
Redenhall Rectory	II	Redenhall			26 November 1976	TM2621384312; 52°24′36″N 1°19′28″E		1156005	Upload Photo	Q26449607
The Grange	II	Redenhall			26 November 1976	TM2589885226; 52°25′06″N 1°19′14″E		1156012	Upload Photo	Q26449617
The Priory	II	Redenhall			26 November 1976	TM2617284366; 52°24′38″N 1°19′26″E		1373344	Upload Photo	Q26654339
Ye Olde Yew Tree	II	Redenhall			26 November 1976	TM2633884408; 52°24′39″N 1°19′35″E		1303068	Upload Photo	Q26590177
Factory Close	II	1 and 3, Redenhall Road, Harleston			26 November 1976	TM2490283896; 52°24′25″N 1°18′18″E		1303045	Upload Photo	Q26590156
Gazebo in Garden and to West of Reydon House	II	1, Redenhall Road, Harleston			26 March 1990	TM2458583531; 52°24′13″N 1°18′01″E		1050777	Upload Photo	Q26302714
Reydon House	II*	1, Redenhall Road, Harleston			11 September 1951	TM2462383529; 52°24′13″N 1°18′03″E		1156016	Upload Photo	Q17532357
3, Redenhall Road	II	3, Redenhall Road, Harleston			11 September 1951	TM2462983544; 52°24′14″N 1°18′03″E		1050137	Upload Photo	Q26302120
Hanlith House Woodrow House	II	4, Redenhall Road, Harleston			26 November 1976	TM2466183526; 52°24′13″N 1°18′05″E		1303050	Upload Photo	Q26590161
5, Redenhall Road	II	5, Redenhall Road, Harleston			7 December 1959	TM2464583552; 52°24′14″N 1°18′04″E		1156021	Upload Photo	Q26449631
8 and 10, Redenhall Road	II	8 and 10, Redenhall Road, Harleston			26 November 1976	TM2466683536; 52°24′13″N 1°18′05″E		1050141	Upload Photo	Q26302125
18, Redenhall Road	II	18, Redenhall Road, Harleston			26 November 1976	TM2468083564; 52°24′14″N 1°18′06″E		1156041	Upload Photo	Q26449660
28, Redenhall Road	II	28, Redenhall Road, Harleston			26 November 1976	TM2470583590; 52°24′15″N 1°18′07″E		1050142	Upload Photo	Q26302126
32, Redenhall Road	II	32, Redenhall Road, Harleston			26 November 1976	TM2472183614; 52°24′16″N 1°18′08″E		1050143	Upload Photo	Q26302127
34, Redenhall Road	II	34, Redenhall Road, Harleston			26 November 1976	TM2472683626; 52°24′16″N 1°18′08″E		1050100	Upload Photo	Q26302085
The Pound House	II	37, Redenhall Road, Harleston			26 November 1976	TM2495383943; 52°24′26″N 1°18′21″E		1050139	Upload Photo	Q26302122
42 and 44, Redenhall Road	II	42 and 44, Redenhall Road, Harleston			26 November 1976	TM2483883770; 52°24′21″N 1°18′14″E		1050102	Upload Photo	Q26302087
Candler's House	II*	Redenhall Road, Harleston			7 December 1959	TM2471883605; 52°24′15″N 1°18′08″E		1156043	Upload Photo	Q17532368
Richmond House	II	Redenhall Road, Harleston			26 November 1976	TM2474483652; 52°24′17″N 1°18′09″E		1050101	Upload Photo	Q26302086
The Flat (haddiscoe Lodge)	II	Redenhall Road, Harleston			26 November 1976	TM2469283614; 52°24′16″N 1°18′06″E		1050138	Upload Photo	Q26302121
7, 8 and 9, Shipps Close	II	7, 8 and 9, Shipps Close, Harleston			26 November 1976	TM2461983310; 52°24′06″N 1°18′02″E		1050103	Upload Photo	Q26302088
Dove House and Southgate House	II	26, Shotford Road, Harleston, IP20 9JN			26 November 1976	TM2435282436; 52°23′38″N 1°17′46″E		1373367	Upload Photo	Q26654361
Barn Approximately 100 Yds North of Shotford Hall	II	Shotford Road, Harleston			26 November 1976	TM2514082161; 52°23′28″N 1°18′27″E		1156063	Upload Photo	Q26449687
Dovecote North-west of Dove House	II	Shotford Road, Harleston			26 November 1976	TM2430782485; 52°23′40″N 1°17′43″E		1373368	Upload Photo	Q26654362
Garden Wall East of Dove House and Southgate House	II	Shotford Road, Harleston, Ip20 9j			26 November 1976	TM2437082440; 52°23′38″N 1°17′47″E		1050104	Upload Photo	Q26302089
Shotford Hall	II	Shotford Road, Harleston			26 November 1976	TM2512382089; 52°23′26″N 1°18′25″E		1050106	Upload Photo	Q26302091
Stables North of Dove House	II	Shotford Road, Harleston			26 November 1976	TM2434782482; 52°23′40″N 1°17′45″E		1050105	Upload Photo	Q26302090
Mill House	II	1, Station Road, Harleston			26 November 1976	TM2465983586; 52°24′15″N 1°18′05″E		1373369	Upload Photo	Q26654363
37, Station Road	II	37, Station Road, Harleston			26 November 1976	TM2470383786; 52°24′21″N 1°18′07″E		1156073	Upload Photo	Q26449700
26, the Common	II	26, The Common, Harleston			26 November 1976	TM2407182918; 52°23′54″N 1°17′32″E		1155729	Upload Photo	Q26449228
G Denny and Sons	II	1, The Thoroughfare, Harleston			26 November 1976	TM2451283341; 52°24′07″N 1°17′56″E		1050107	Upload Photo	Q26302092
2 and 4, the Thoroughfare	II	2 and 4, The Thoroughfare, Harleston			26 November 1976	TM2454483342; 52°24′07″N 1°17′58″E		1050266	Upload Photo	Q26302256
3, 5 and 7, the Thoroughfare	II	3, 5 and 7, The Thoroughfare, Harleston			26 November 1976	TM2452083353; 52°24′08″N 1°17′57″E		1303028	Upload Photo	Q26590141
6 and 8, the Thoroughfare	II	6 and 8, The Thoroughfare, Harleston			26 November 1976	TM2455483364; 52°24′08″N 1°17′58″E		1373286	Upload Photo	Q26654282
9 11 15, the Thoroughfare	II	9 11 15, The Thoroughfare, Harleston			26 November 1976	TM2453283367; 52°24′08″N 1°17′57″E		1373370	Upload Photo	Q26654364
12, the Thoroughfare	II	12, The Thoroughfare, Harleston			26 November 1976	TM2456283379; 52°24′08″N 1°17′59″E		1154195	Upload Photo	Q26447218
14, the Thoroughfare	II	14, The Thoroughfare, Harleston			26 November 1976	TM2456783385; 52°24′09″N 1°17′59″E		1050267	Upload Photo	Q26302257
16, the Thoroughfare	II	16, The Thoroughfare, Harleston			26 November 1976	TM2457683401; 52°24′09″N 1°18′00″E		1154212	Upload Photo	Q26447241
17, the Thoroughfare	II	17, The Thoroughfare, Harleston			26 November 1976	TM2453883385; 52°24′09″N 1°17′58″E		1050108	Upload Photo	Q26302093
18, the Thoroughfare	II	18, The Thoroughfare, Harleston			26 November 1976	TM2458383410; 52°24′09″N 1°18′00″E		1373287	Upload Photo	Q26654283
20, 22 and 24, the Thoroughfare	II	20, 22 and 24, The Thoroughfare, Harleston			26 November 1976	TM2458783420; 52°24′10″N 1°18′00″E		1154227	Upload Photo	Q26447260
21, the Thoroughfare	II	21, The Thoroughfare, Harleston			26 November 1976	TM2456283412; 52°24′09″N 1°17′59″E		1156098	Upload Photo	Q26449731
25, the Thoroughfare	II	25, The Thoroughfare, Harleston			26 November 1976	TM2458083440; 52°24′10″N 1°18′00″E		1156084	Upload Photo	Q26449712
26, the Thoroughfare	II	26, The Thoroughfare, Harleston			26 November 1976	TM2459383432; 52°24′10″N 1°18′01″E		1050268	Upload Photo	Q26302258
Ancient House	II	27, The Thoroughfare, Harleston			26 November 1976	TM2458483446; 52°24′10″N 1°18′00″E		1373371	Upload Photo	Q26654365
29, the Thoroughfare	II	29, The Thoroughfare, Harleston			26 November 1976	TM2458883452; 52°24′11″N 1°18′00″E		1373372	Upload Photo	Q26654366
33, the Thoroughfare	II	33, The Thoroughfare, Harleston			26 November 1976	TM2460383479; 52°24′12″N 1°18′01″E		1156115	Upload Photo	Q26449755
34, the Thoroughfare	II	34, The Thoroughfare, Harleston			26 November 1976	TM2461483459; 52°24′11″N 1°18′02″E		1373288	Upload Photo	Q26654284
35, the Thoroughfare	II	35, The Thoroughfare, Harleston			26 November 1976	TM2461083491; 52°24′12″N 1°18′02″E		1050111	Upload Photo	Q26302095
37, the Thoroughfare	II	37, The Thoroughfare, Harleston			26 November 1976	TM2461283499; 52°24′12″N 1°18′02″E		1050265	Upload Photo	Q26302255
Oulton House	II	39 and 41, The Thoroughfare, Harleston			26 November 1976	TM2461883507; 52°24′12″N 1°18′02″E		1154190	Upload Photo	Q26447212
Cardinal's Hat Inn	II	The Thoroughfare, Harleston	pub		11 September 1951	TM2457883432; 52°24′10″N 1°18′00″E		1050110	Cardinal's Hat Inn More images	Q26302094
Outbuilding at Rear of No 17	II	The Thoroughfare, Harleston			26 November 1976	TM2452483387; 52°24′09″N 1°17′57″E		1303032	Upload Photo	Q26590144
Swan Hotel	II*	The Thoroughfare, Harleston	hotel		11 September 1951	TM2455483401; 52°24′09″N 1°17′59″E		1050109	Upload Photo	Q17531552
3 and 5, Union Street	II	3 and 5, Union Street			26 November 1976	TM2458383394; 52°24′09″N 1°18′00″E		1303902	Upload Photo	Q26590932
9, Union Street	II	9, Union Street, Harleston			26 November 1976	TM2459183391; 52°24′09″N 1°18′00″E		1050269	Upload Photo	Q26302259
Pleasure Farmhouse	II	Wilderness Lane, Harleston			26 November 1976	TM2415083392; 52°24′09″N 1°17′37″E		1303877	Upload Photo	Q26590909
2, Redenhall Road (see Details for Further Address Information)	II	1, Wilson's Square, Harleston			26 November 1976	TM2465583515; 52°24′13″N 1°18′04″E		1050140	Upload Photo	Q26302123
2, Wilsons Square	II	2, Wilsons Square, Harleston			26 November 1976	TM2465783502; 52°24′12″N 1°18′04″E		1050270	Upload Photo	Q26302260
Philomel	II	5, Wilsons Square, Harleston			26 November 1976	TM2466583499; 52°24′12″N 1°18′05″E		1303882	Upload Photo	Q26590913

== See also ==
- Grade I listed buildings in Norfolk
- Grade II* listed buildings in Norfolk

== Sources ==
- Wilson, Bill; Pevsner, Nikolaus (1999) [1962], Norfolk 2: North-West and South, The Buildings of England, New Haven and London: Yale University Press, ISBN 978-0-300-09657-6
