= Bungay railway station =

Disused railway station in England

Coordinates: 52.4576°N 1.42890°E

Bungay
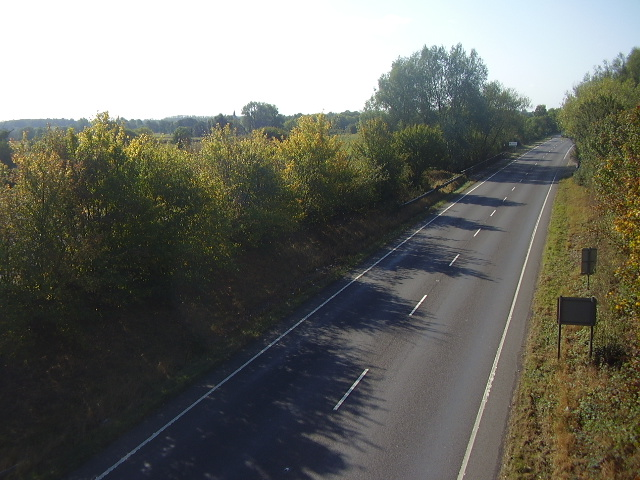
- The site of Bungay station in 2009

General information
- Location: Bungay, East Suffolk; England
- Grid reference: TM330899
- Platforms: 2

Other information
- Status: Disused

History
- Original company: Waveney Valley Railway
- Pre-grouping: Great Eastern Railway
- Post-grouping: London and North Eastern Railway; Eastern Region of British Railways

Key dates
- 2 November 1860: Opened
- 5 January 1953: Closed to passengers
- 3 August 1964: Closed to freight
Location

Bungay railway station was located on the now disused Waveney Valley Line which ran between Tivetshall and Beccles. The station was closed in 1953 and the buildings eventually demolished to make way for the A143 road. It was one of two stations in Suffolk on the line, which curved across the county boundary then back into Norfolk.

== History ==
On 3 July 1851, the Waveney Valley Railway (WVR) was formed, with powers to build a railway line from Tivetshall on the Eastern Union Railway (EUR) to Bungay; an extension to Beccles was authorised on 4 August 1853. The line was opened in stages: the first section, between Tivetshall and Harleston was opened on 1 December 1855; and the line reached Bungay on 2 November 1860. The final part of the line opened on 2 March 1863 when the line to Beccles opened and Bungay became a through station. From opening, the WVR was worked by the Eastern Counties Railway (ECR), which had absorbed the EUR in 1854; but following a dispute, the WVR worked its own trains. The WVR was absorbed by the Great Eastern Railway (GER) in July 1863 - the GER had been formed in 1862 when the ECR amalgamated with several other railways.

On 9 March 1863 the 4:50pm Bungay-Beccles train was derailed dragging its carriages for about 70 yards (64 m) before running off the embankment.

In August 1912 the line was temporarily closed between Bungay and Harleston as the River Waveney had flooded. The GER provided a number of its own buses to provide a replacement passenger service in the interim.

On 1 January 1923, the GER amalgamated with several other railways to form the London & North Eastern Railway following the 1923 grouping.

During World War II the station probably saw its busiest period of operation due to the proximity of a number of airbases.

In 1948 following nationalisation of the railways the station became part of the Eastern Region of British Railways. In 1952 the line was badly affected by a number of gales in the area. A steam crane was bought in from Ipswich to assist with clearing the line.

Passenger services were withdrawn in 1953 although a number of enthusiast specials traversed the line up until 1960.

As it opened in stages the line closed in stages. The Bungay - Harleston section closed in late 1960 but freight between Bungay and Beccles continued until August 1964.

== Facilities ==
The branch was mostly single track and Bungay was one of the locations where trains could cross. It had two platforms, one serving eastbound and the other westbound trains. A signal box was located at the east end of the station opposite the goods yard. A new signal box was provided by the GER in 1891.

The original station buildings were timber and lasted until the 1930s, when an improved brick structure was provided by the London & North Eastern Railway. Pictures from 1922 showed that the buildings were looking dilapidated and this was an issue raised by the town reeve who suggested some of the buildings may have been the original contractors huts.

The station had an adjoining goods yard with four sidings, a goods shed, a 30 cwt crane and end loading dock. Inward traffic consisted of house coal, household goods and construction materials whilst outwards the traffic was largely agricultural.

== Passenger Services ==
The line was a rural line passing through sparsely populated areas. As a result, the train service was never particularly frequent.

At opening there were four trains each way on a weekday with an additional service on Saturdays.

Between 1910 and 1915 there were seven trains per day but the advent of World War 1 saw these cut back to six by 1917. Four of these worked through from Norwich, the other two from Tivetshall (the main line junction).

== Locomotives ==
The line was lightly built and as a result lighter engines were employed on trains.

Early services were in the hands of a 2-2-2T locomotive called Perseverance.

Photographic evidence shows the following classes of engine worked through Bungay station.

- GER Class Y14 - later LNER classification J15. 0-6-0 tender locomotive built by the GER
- GER Class T26 - later LNER classification E4. 2-4-0 tender locomotive built by the GER
- GER Class M15 - later LNER classification F4 2-4-2 tank engine built by the GER
Former Services

Preceding station	Disused railways	Following station
Earsham	Great Eastern Railway; Waveney Valley Line	Ditchingham
