= Starston =

Village in Norfolk, England

Coordinates: 52.412681°N 1.284027°E

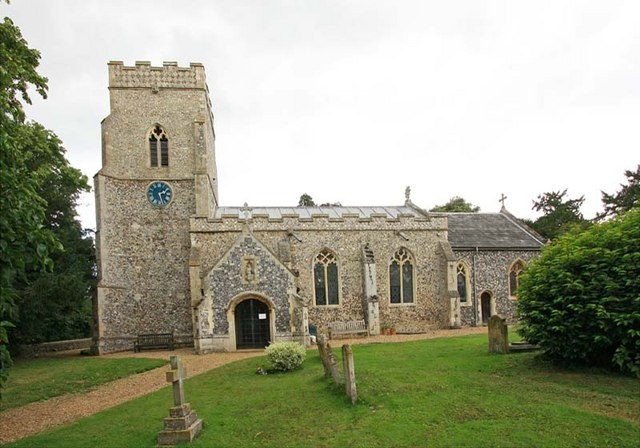
- St Margaret's church, Starston

- Location within Norfolk
- Area: 9.02 km^{2} (3.48 sq mi)
- Population: 331 (2011)
  - Density: 37/km^{2} (96/sq mi)
- OS grid reference: TM234844
- Civil parish: Starston
- District: South Norfolk
- Shire county: Norfolk
- Region: East
- Country: England
- Sovereign state: United Kingdom
- Post town: HARLESTON
- Postcode district: IP20
- Dialling code: 01379
- Police: Norfolk
- Fire: Norfolk
- Ambulance: East of England
- UK Parliament: Waveney Valley

Starston is a small village and civil parish in Norfolk, England. It covers an area of 9.02 km^{2} (3.48 sq mi) and had a population of 321 in 123 households at the 2001 census, the population increasing to 331 at the 2011 Census.

The Starston village sign features a wind pump that was used to transport water from the Beck River up to Starston Place, which was demolished during the early 1900s. The wind pump remained and was restored in 2010, and can be seen from the roadside.

Between 1856 and 1866, it had its own railway station on the Waveney Valley Line before it was closed to passenger services through lack of usage. Freight and passenger through trains continued until the Beeching Axe in the 1960s.

The village had a pub called "The Gate" until the 1950s. This was turned into a shop, which closed in 1984. The pub sign still exists and is owned by local residents. The village school closed in 1968. Most village children now attend schools in Harleston, about 1 mile (1.6 km) away.

In 2010, Starston villagers purchased Glebe Meadow in the heart of the village and converted it into a public space with attractive views of the church.

David Knopfler of Dire Straits was once a resident of Starston.

== Village Magazine ==
The village publishes a monthly magazine called The Pigeon Post.
