= Wortwell railway station =

Disused railway station in Norfolk, England

Coordinates: 52.4161°N 1.3440°E

Wortwell
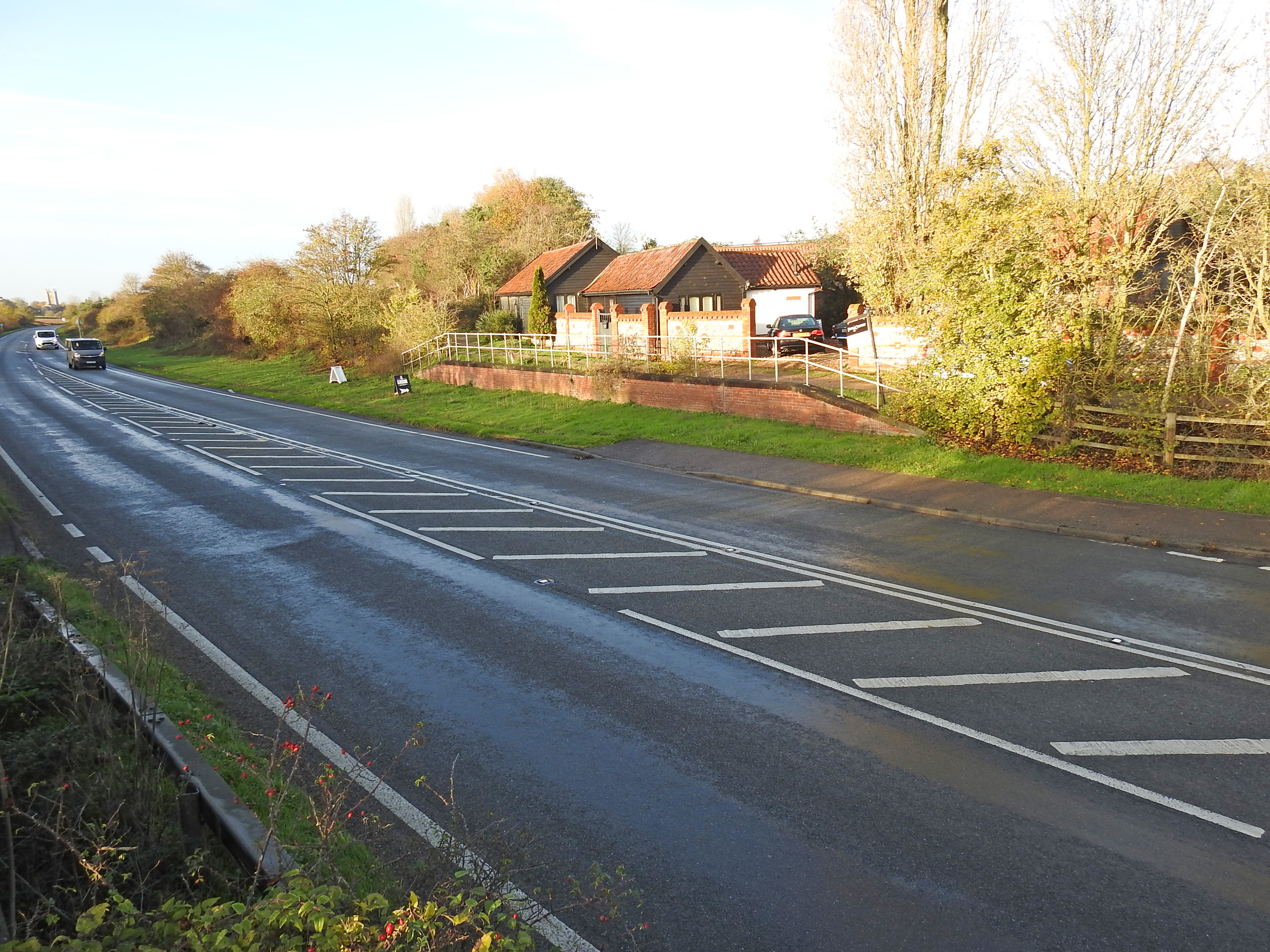
- The location of the former station in 2022

General information
- Location: Wortwell, South Norfolk, Norfolk; England
- Platforms: 1

Other information
- Status: Disused

History
- Pre-grouping: Waveney Valley Railway; Great Eastern Railway

Key dates
- 1 Dec 1855: Opened
- 1 August 1878: Closed
Location

Wortwell was a station in the small hamlet of Wortwell, Norfolk. It was opened in 1855, as part of the Waveney Valley Line between Tivetshall and Beccles, and closed in 1878.

Former Services

Preceding station	Disused railways	Following station
Redenhall	Great Eastern Railway; Waveney Valley Line	Homersfield
