= Earsham =

Village in Norfolk, England

Coordinates: 52.451825°N 1.417236°E

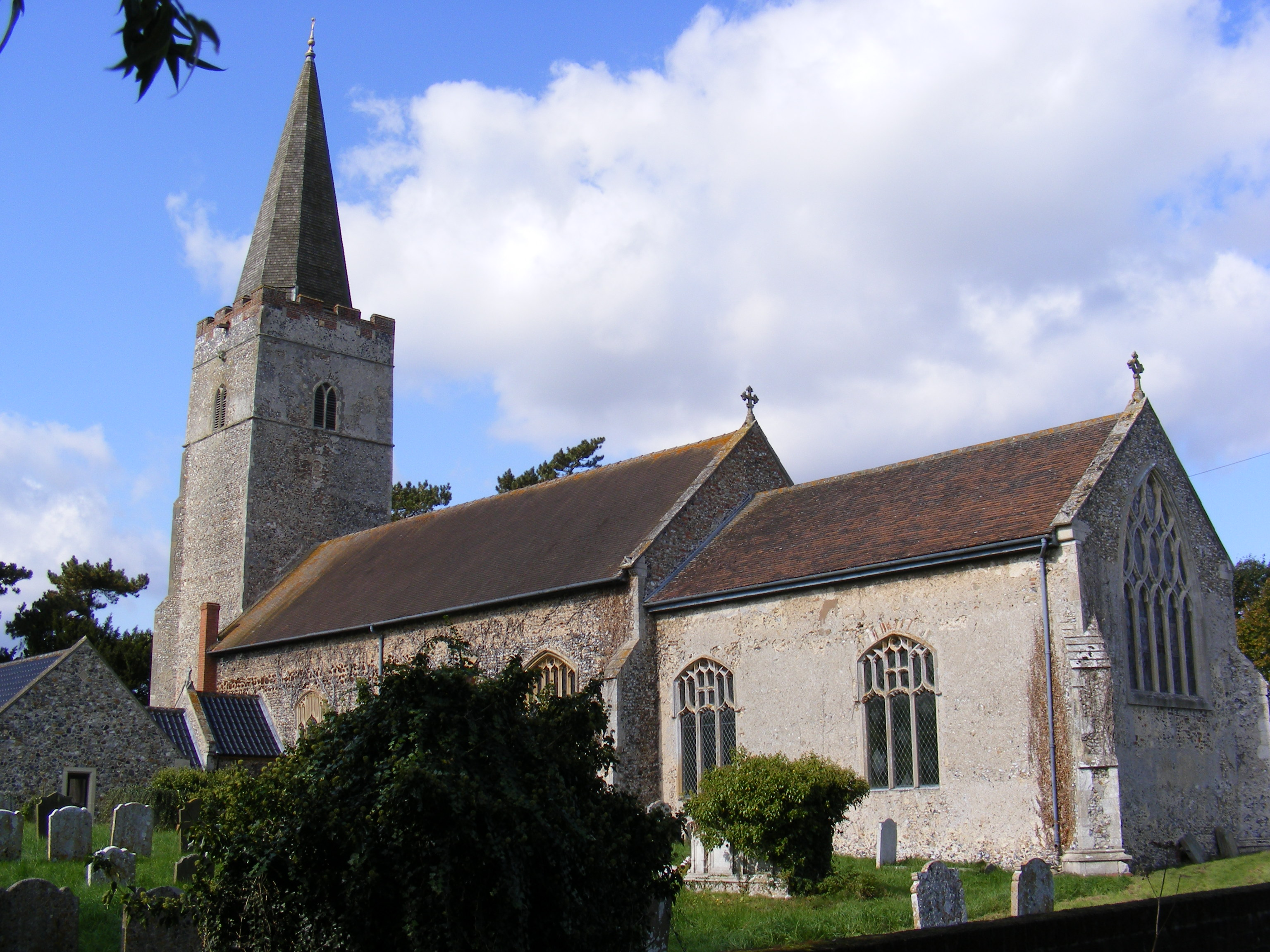
- All Saints' Church

- Location within Norfolk
- Area: 4.88 sq mi (12.6 km^{2})
- Population: 935 (2021 census)
  - Density: 192/sq mi (74/km^{2})
- OS grid reference: TM322892
  - London: 149 kilometres (93 mi)
- Civil parish: Earsham
- District: South Norfolk
- Shire county: Norfolk
- Region: East
- Country: England
- Sovereign state: United Kingdom
- Post town: BUNGAY
- Postcode district: NR35
- Dialling code: 01986
- Police: Norfolk
- Fire: Norfolk
- Ambulance: East of England
- UK Parliament: Waveney Valley

Earsham is a village and civil parish in the English county of Norfolk.

Earsham is located 1.1 miles (1.8 km) west of Bungay and 13 miles (21 km) south-east of Norwich. The village is located close to the border between Norfolk and Suffolk, and the River Waveney.

== History ==
Earsham's name is of Anglo-Saxon origin and derives from the Old English for the homestead or settlement of an earl or built around a hill.

Earsham Mill has stood in some form in the village since the time of the Anglo-Saxons, using the River Waveney to grind wheat into flour. The mill building still exists today.

In the Domesday Book, Earsham is listed as a settlement of 69 households in its own hundred. In 1086, the village was part of the East Anglian estates of King William I.

Earsham Hall was built in the Eighteenth Century by John Buxton and was first inhabited by Lt-Col. William Windham. The hall was remodelled in the Georgian style by Sir John Soane and exists today as a venue for wedding receptions and antiques dealing.

During the First World War, parts of Earsham parish were used as a landing strip for airplanes of the Royal Flying Corps. During the Second World War, parts of the abandoned airfield and Earsham Hall were used as bomb storage for the United States Army Air Forces.

== Geography ==
According to the 2021 census, Earsham has a total population of 935 people which demonstrates an increase from the 882 people listed in the 2011 census.

Earsham is located along the course of the River Waveney and the A143, between Gorleston-on-Sea and Haverhill.

== All Saints' Church ==
Earsham's parish church is located on Mill Road, dates from the Fourteenth Century and has been Grade I listed since 1959.

All Saints' is a rarity for an East Anglian church as its tower is topped by a spire. Inside the church, is a Medieval font depicting the seven sacraments and the crucifixion of Jesus as well as stained-glass from Europe and roundels from the workshops of Robert Allen and Samuel Yarrington.

== Amenities ==
Earsham's Queen's Head has operated as a coaching inn since the mid-19th century, the pub remains open to this day.

== Transport ==
Earsham railway station opened in 1860 as a stop on the Waveney Valley Line connecting Tivetshall to Beccles. The station was closed in 1953.

== Notable residents ==
- Lt-Col. William Windham (1674–1730)- British Army officer and politician.
- William Windham (1706–1789)- Landowner and politician.
- Andrew Gilding - PDC darts player and 2023 UK Open champion.

== Governance ==
Earsham is part of the electoral ward of Ditchingham & Earsham for local elections and is part of the district of South Norfolk.

The village's national constituency is Waveney Valley which has been represented by the Green Party's Adrian Ramsay MP since 2024.

== War Memorial ==
Earsham's War Memorial is a stone memorial topped with a celtic cross on the village green. The memorial lists the following names for the First World War:

Rank	Name	Unit	Date of death	Burial/Commemoration
Lt.	Robert P. Meade	13th Bn., Rifle Brigade	11 Jun. 1916	Thiepval Memorial
Sgt.	Albert Clarke	1st Bn., Norfolk Regiment	27 Jul. 1916	Thiepval Memorial
Cpl.	Harvey J. Holland	1054th Coy., Army Service Corps	10 Dec. 1919	Tehran War Cemetery
Cpl.	Hennes R. Bedwell	8th Bn., East Lancashire Regiment	15 Jul. 1916	Pozières Cemetery
Cpl.	Sidney W. Threadgold	Royal Air Force	2 Sep. 1918	All Saints' Churchyard
Cpl.	William R. Barber	Royal Field Artillery	9 Nov. 1918	Annœullin Cemetery
Dvr.	William Page	Salonika Depot, Army Service Corps	2 Jun. 1917	Chatby Memorial
Gnr.	Harry Runicles	86th Bde., Royal Field Artillery	9 Jul. 1916	Thiepval Memorial
Gnr.	William Jolly	38th Coy., Royal Garrison Artillery	6 Jul. 1918	All Saints' Churchyard
Pte.	Edward J. Gooch	1st Bn., Cheshire Regiment	24 Aug. 1914	La Ferté Memorial
Pte.	Leonard W. Saunders	9th Bn., East Surrey Regiment	27 Mar. 1918	Pozières Memorial
Pte.	William H. Howell	5th Bn., Middlesex Regiment	14 May 1919	St. Alban's Churchyard
Pte.	William Wilby	2nd Bn., Norfolk Regiment	30 Sep. 1916	North Gate Cemetery
Pte.	Edgar G. Prime	8th Bn., Norfolk Regt.	19 Feb. 1917	Dernancourt Cemetery
Pte.	Herbert G. Houghton	9th Bn., Norfolk Regt.	8 Oct. 1918	Vis-en-Artois Memorial
Pte.	John K. High	2nd Bn., Ox and Bucks Light Infantry	28 Apr. 1917	Arras Memorial
Pte.	Charles W. Hood	1/5th Bn., Suffolk Regiment	2 Nov. 1917	Gaza War Cemetery
Pte.	Victor J. Remblance	6th Bn., Suffolk Regt.	16 Aug. 1916	Thiepval Memorial
Pte.	Albert G. Threadgold	9th Bn., Suffolk Regt.	19 Oct. 1916	Thiepval Memorial
Pte.	Arthur Smith	11th Bn., Suffolk Regt.	6 Sep. 1916	Trois Arbres Cemetery
Pte.	Samuel Barnes	9th Bn., Worcestershire Regiment	19 Jun. 1916	Basra War Cemetery
Tpt.	Arthur T. Tibbenham	1/1st Bn., Essex Yeomanry	11 Apr. 1917	Arras Memorial
Ymn.	Bernard S. Banham	HMS Shark	31 May 1916	Chatham Naval Memorial
Dhd.	James E. Howlett	H.M. Drifter Enterprise II	8 May 1916	Bari War Cemetery
Dhd.	William W. Remblance	H.M. Drifter Kent County	8 Dec. 1916	Chatham Naval Memorial

And, the following from the Second World War:

Rank	Name	Unit	Date of death	Burial/Commemoration
CPO	Alfred L. Lewis	HMS Niger	6 Jul. 1942	Chatham Naval Memorial
AS	Ronald T. Gilham	HMS Cornwall	5 Apr. 1942	Chatham Naval Memorial
Gdsm.	Frederick C. Gooch	2nd Bn., Coldstream Guards	1 Jun. 1940	Dunkirk Memorial
Gnr.	Frederick J. Howell	14 (Anti-tank) Regt., Royal Artillery	13 Apr. 1943	Béja War Cemetery
Mne.	Thomas E. Southgate	Royal Marines att. HMS Hood	24 May 1941	Portsmouth Memorial
Pte.	E. William Longshaw	4th Bn., Royal Norfolk Regiment	29 Nov. 1944	Kanchanaburi Cemetery
Pte.	Victor R. Canham	7th Bn., Royal Norfolks.	12 Jun. 1940	Grandcourt War Cemetery
