= Ellingham railway station =

Former railway station in England

Coordinates: 52.4744°N 1.4795°E

Ellingham
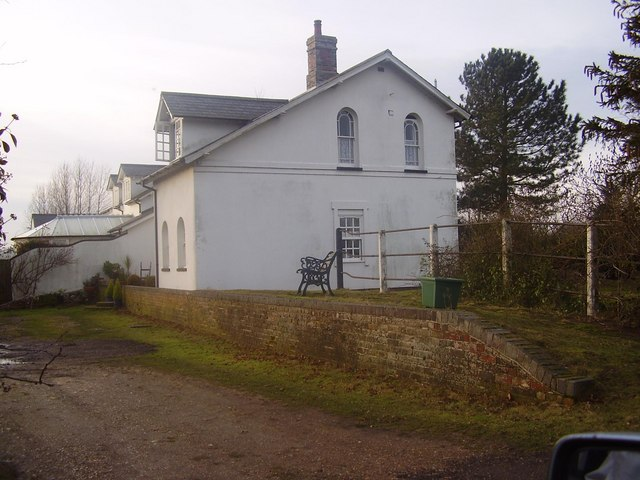

General information
- Location: Ellingham, South Norfolk, Norfolk; England
- Grid reference: TM363919
- Platforms: 1

Other information
- Status: Disused

History
- Pre-grouping: Waveney Valley Railway; Great Eastern Railway
- Post-grouping: London and North Eastern Railway; Eastern Region of British Railways

Key dates
- 2 Mar 1863: Opened
- 5 Jan 1953: Closed to passengers
- 1965: Closed to freight
Location

Ellingham is a former railway station in Ellingham, Norfolk. It was opened in 1863 as part of the Waveney Valley Line between Tivetshall and Beccles, Suffolk. The railway was crucial during World War II. A fuel storage depot and sidings were constructed in 1943, along with defence works: a pillbox near the bridge, plus a searchlight and machine gun protecting the marshes on the west of Station Lane. It was closed to passengers in 1953 and closed fully on 19 April 1965, when the last goods train called there. The station building has since been converted into a private house, the platform is still in place.

Preceding station	Disused railways	Following station
Ditchingham; Line and station closed	Great Eastern Railway; Waveney Valley Line	Geldeston; Line and station closed
