= Gawdyhall Big Wood, Harleston =

Site of Special Scientific Interest in Norfolk, England

Coordinates: 52.416°N 1.307°E

- Site of Special Scientific Interest
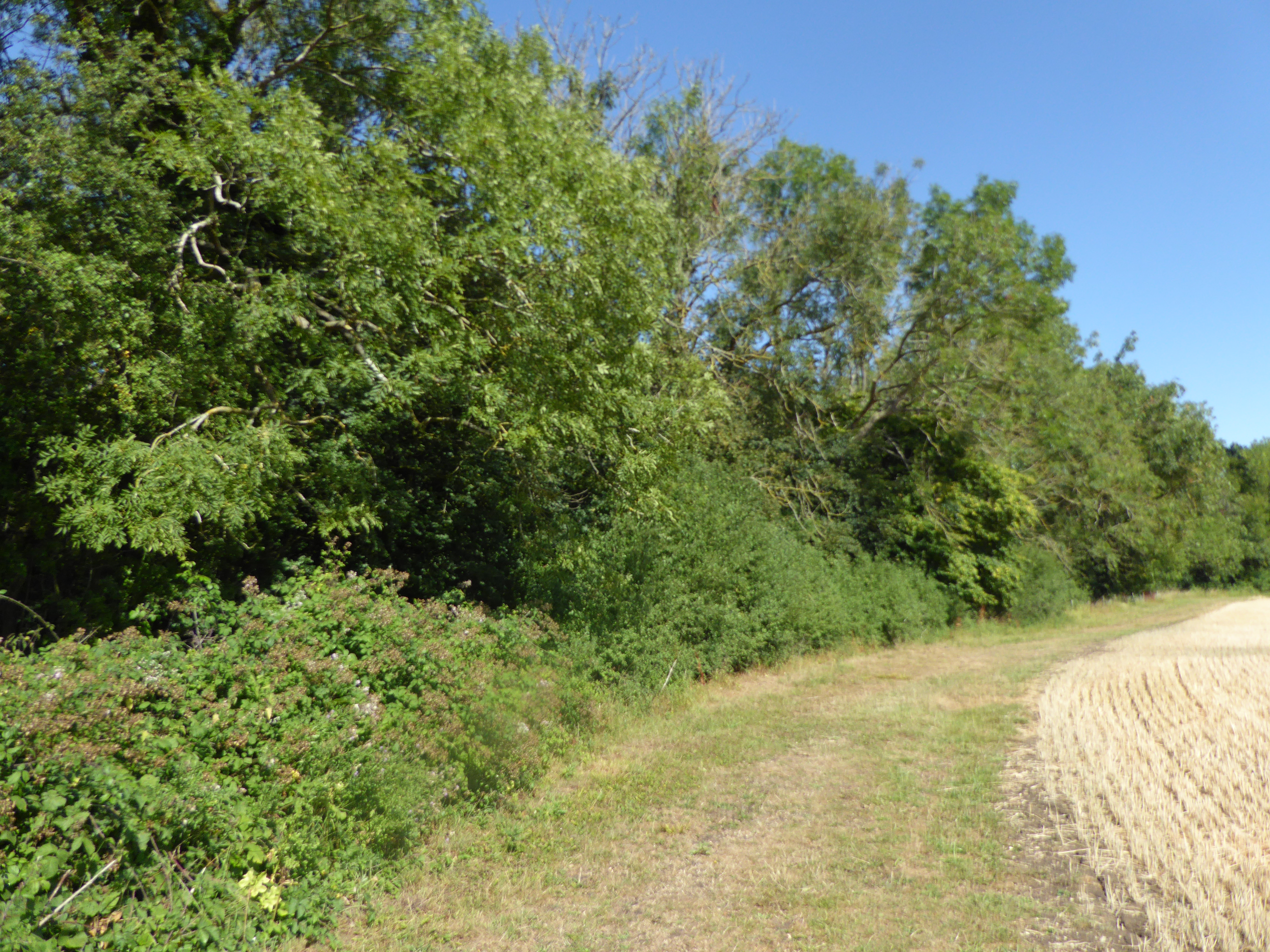
- Location of Gawdyhall Big Wood, Harleston.
- Area of search: Norfolk
- Grid reference: TM 250 849
- Interest: Biological
- Area: 29.8 hectares (74 acres)
- Notification date: 1986
- Location map: Magic Map

Gawdyhall Big Wood, Harleston is a 29.8-hectare (74-acre) biological Site of Special Scientific Interest north of Harleston in Norfolk, England.

This ancient wood on poorly drained chalky boulder clay has coppiced hornbeam, ash and hazel with oak standards. The ground flora is especially diverse around the hornbeams and on wet rides.

The site is private land with no public access.
