= Homersfield railway station =

Railway station in Suffolk, England

Coordinates: 52.4236°N 1.3549°E

Homersfield
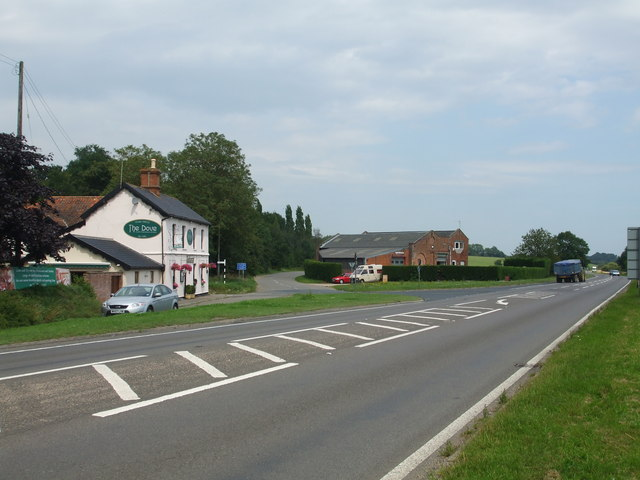
- The station site today

General information
- Location: Alburgh, South Norfolk; England
- Grid reference: TM282859
- Platforms: 1

Other information
- Status: Disused

History
- Pre-grouping: Waveney Valley Railway; Great Eastern Railway
- Post-grouping: London and North Eastern Railway; Eastern Region of British Railways

Key dates
- 2 November 1860: Opened
- 5 January 1953: Closed to passengers
- 1 February 1960: Closed to freight
Location

Homersfield was a railway station which served the village of Homersfield in Suffolk, England, although the station was located in Alburgh, across the county boundary in Norfolk. The station was part of the Waveney Valley Line.

Former Services

Preceding station	Disused railways	Following station
Wortwell	Great Eastern Railway; Waveney Valley Line	Earsham
