= Earsham railway station =

Former railway station in England

Coordinates: 52.4510°N 1.4141°E

Earsham
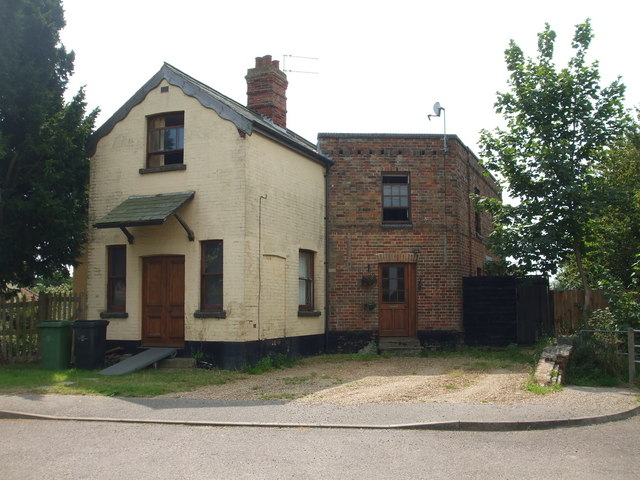
- Earsham Railway station

General information
- Location: Earsham, South Norfolk; England
- Grid reference: TM320891
- Platforms: 1

Other information
- Status: Disused

History
- Pre-grouping: Waveney Valley Railway; Great Eastern Railway
- Post-grouping: London and North Eastern Railway; Eastern Region of British Railways

Key dates
- 2 November 1860: Opened
- 22 May 1916: Closed
- 1 August 1919: Reopened
- 5 January 1953: Closed to passengers
- 1960: Closed to goods
Location

Earsham was a railway station in Earsham, Norfolk, England. It was located on the Waveney Valley Line which connected Beccles with the Great Eastern Main Line. It opened in 1860 and closed to passengers in 1953, and to goods services in 1960. The station building was not demolished, but lay derelict for many years before being converted into a house. The platform also remains.

Former Services

Preceding station	Disused railways	Following station
Homersfield	Great Eastern Railway; Waveney Valley Line	Bungay
