= Needham, Norfolk =

Village in Norfolk, England

Coordinates: 52.38576°N 1.27121°E

Needham
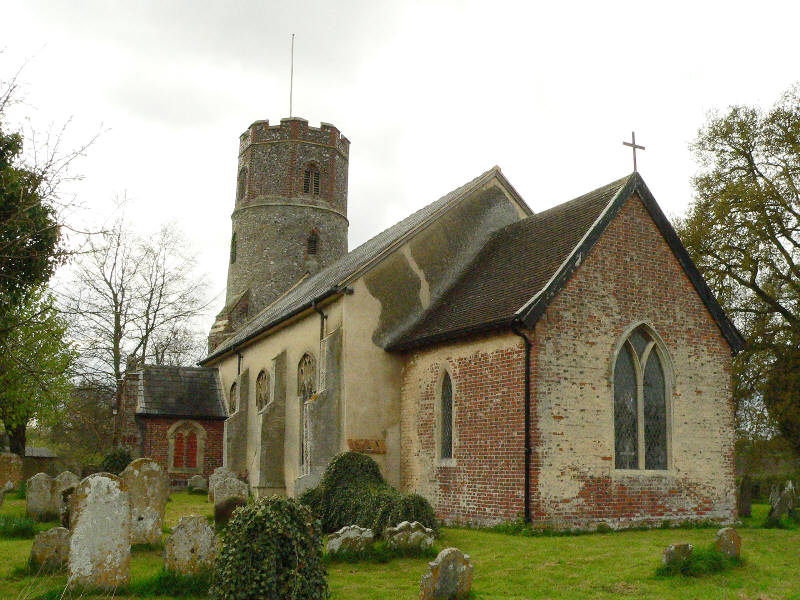
- Needham St Peter

- Location within Norfolk
- Area: 4.69 km^{2} (1.81 sq mi)
- Population: 309
  - Density: 66/km^{2} (170/sq mi)
- OS grid reference: TM227814
- Civil parish: Needham
- District: South Norfolk
- Shire county: Norfolk
- Region: East
- Country: England
- Sovereign state: United Kingdom
- Post town: HARLESTON
- Postcode district: IP20
- Dialling code: 01379
- Police: Norfolk
- Fire: Norfolk
- Ambulance: East of England
- UK Parliament: Waveney Valley

Needham is a small village in Norfolk, England. It covers an area of 4.69 km^{2} (1.81 sq mi) and had a population of 310 in 129 households at the 2001 census, falling marginally to 309 at the 2011 census.

Its church, St Peter, is one of 124 existing round-tower churches in Norfolk.

== References in popular culture ==
- The television series The West Wing had a recurring character named, "Lord John Marbury, Earl of Croy, Marquess of Needham and Dolby, Baronet of Brycey."
