= Redenhall railway station =

Disused railway station in Norfolk, England

Coordinates: 52.4104°N 1.3184°E

Redenhall
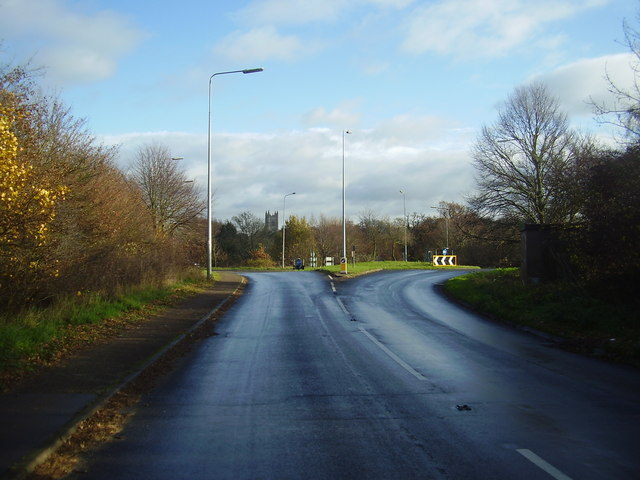
- Site of Redenhall Railway Station today

General information
- Location: Redenhall, South Norfolk, Norfolk; England
- Platforms: 1

Other information
- Status: Disused

History
- Original company: Waveney Valley Railway

Key dates
- January 1861: Opened
- 1 August 1866: Closed
Location

Redenhall was a station in the small hamlet of Redenhall, Norfolk. It was opened in 1861 as part of the Waveney Valley Line between Tivetshall and Beccles and closed in 1866. It was close to the settlement of Harleston.

Preceding station	Disused railways	Following station
Harleston	Great Eastern Railway; Waveney Valley Line	Wortwell
