= Pulham St Mary railway station =

Disused railway station in Norfolk, England

Coordinates: 52.4174°N 1.2444°E

Pulham St Mary
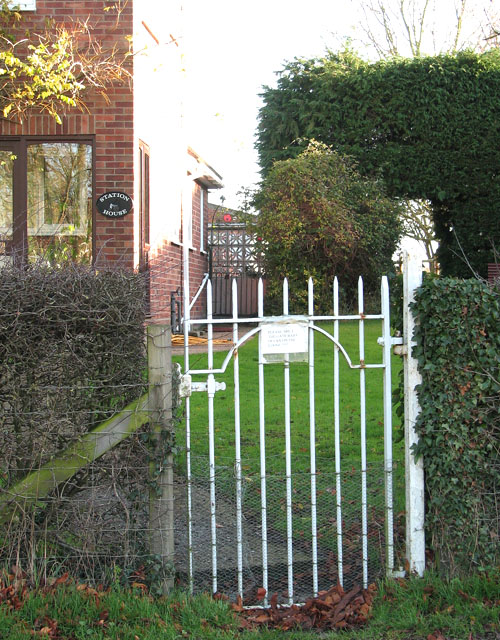
- Site of Pulham St Mary railway station

General information
- Location: Pulham St Mary, South Norfolk, Norfolk; England
- Grid reference: TM 2072684886
- Platforms: 1

Other information
- Status: Disused

History
- Pre-grouping: Waveney Valley Railway; Great Eastern Railway
- Post-grouping: London and North Eastern Railway; Eastern Region of British Railways

Key dates
- 1 December 1855: Opened (Pulham St Mary)
- November 1856: Renamed (Pulham Mary)
- June 1894: Renamed (Pulham St Mary)
- 5 January 1953: Closed to passengers
- 13 July 1964: Closed to freight
Location

Pulham St Mary was a station in Pulham St Mary, Norfolk on the Waveney Valley Line which is now closed. The station has been demolished.

Former Services

Preceding station	Disused railways	Following station
Pulham Market	Great Eastern Railway; Waveney Valley Line	Starston
