= Corn Exchange, Harleston =

Commercial building in Harleston, Norfolk, England

Corn Exchange
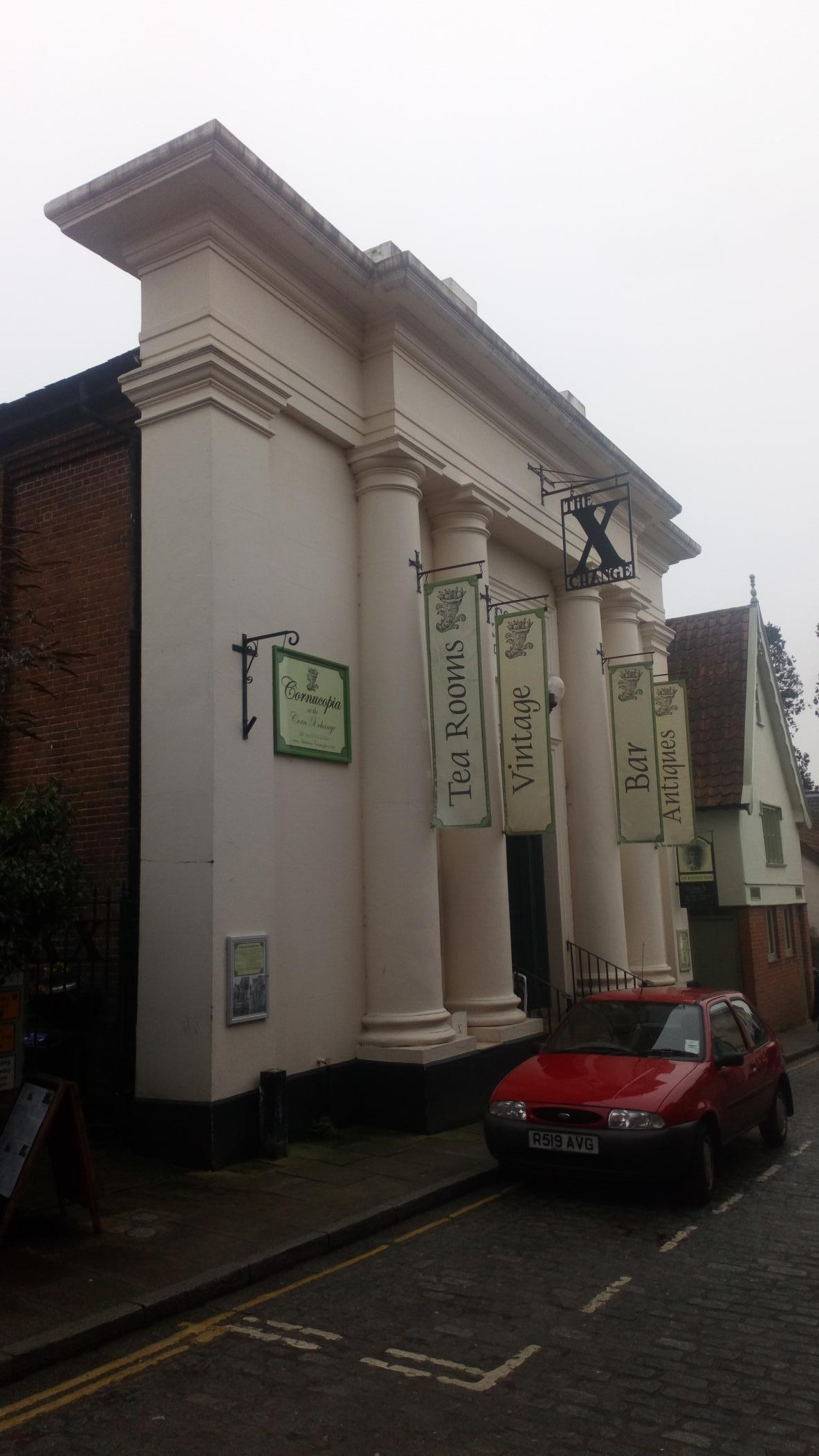
- Corn Exchange, Harleston

- Shown in Norfolk
- 52.4013°N 1.2995°E
- Location: Exchange Street, Harleston

History
- Built: 1849

Site notes
- Architect: John Bunn
- Architectural style: Neoclassical style

Listed Building – Grade II
- Official name: Corn Exchange
- Designated: 26 November 1976
- Reference no.: 1303219

The Corn Exchange is a commercial building in Exchange Street in Harleston, Norfolk, England. The structure, which was used as a vintage and antiques emporium until June 2023, is a Grade II listed building.

== History ==
Until the mid-19th century, corn merchants conducted their trade in the open air around the Market Cross, which was situated where the Clock Tower now stands, on the north side of the Market Place.

Following the repeal of the Corn Laws in 1846, local leaders decided to commission a purpose-built corn exchange. The new building was designed by John Bunn of Norwich in the neoclassical style, built with a stucco finish and was completed in 1849. The design involved a symmetrical main frontage of three bays facing onto Exchange Street. The central bay, which was slightly projected forward, featured a tetrastyle portico formed by four Tuscan order columns supporting a heavy entablature and a cornice. Inside the portico, there was a double doorway with a moulded architrave and a rectangular fanlight. Above the doorway was a rectangular panel, inscribed with the words "Corn Exchange" and the date of construction. The outer bays, which were blind, featured Tuscan order pilasters at the corners. Internally, the principal room was the main hall, which was 70 feet (21 m) long and 40 feet (12 m) wide.

The architectural historian, Nikolaus Pevsner, was unimpressed with the concept which he described as "a crude design based on giant Tuscan columns". The use of the building as a corn exchange declined significantly in the wake of the Great Depression of British Agriculture in the late 19th century. The building instead served as the venue for petty session hearings, and as a venue for public events including dances, regimental balls and roller skating events.

In the early 1990s, the corn exchange closed and, after the fabric of the building began to deteriorate, it was put on the Heritage at Risk Register. The Canadian actor, Bradley Lavelle, acquired the building and, in 2004, initiated a major programme of refurbishment works to convert it into a shopping venue with restaurant, wine bar, and delicatessen known as Xchange. The business was not financially successful and, after it closed in July 2005, the building was sold in 2007.

The building re-opened as a vintage and antiques emporium under new management in August 2013, but, after the business again faced financial difficulties, it changed hands in 2022. In the context of the cost-of-living crisis, the new owner closed it again in June 2023.

== See also ==
- Corn exchanges in England
