= Pulham Market railway station =

Disused railway station in Norfolk, England

Coordinates: 52.4248°N 1.2234°E

Pulham Market
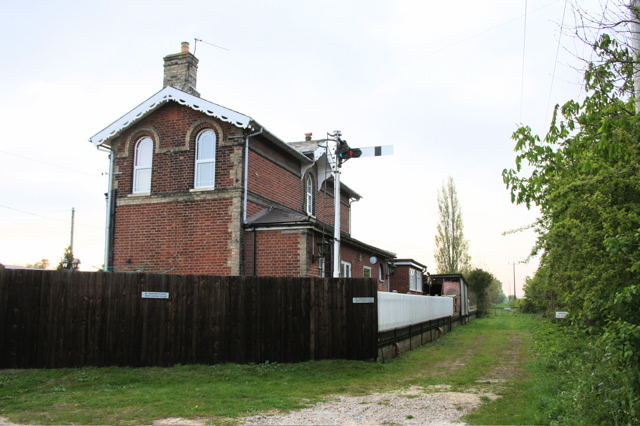
- Pulham Market railway station in 2008

General information
- Location: Pulham Market, South Norfolk; England
- Grid reference: TM192856
- Platforms: 1

Other information
- Status: Disused

History
- Pre-grouping: Waveney Valley Railway; Great Eastern Railway
- Post-grouping: London and North Eastern Railway; Eastern Region of British Railways

Key dates
- 1 December 1855: Opened as Pulham St Magdalene
- March 1856: Renamed Pulham Market
- 5 January 1953: Closed to passengers
- 13 July 1964: Closed to freight
Location

Pulham Market (originally Pulham St Magdalene) was a railway station on the Waveney Valley Line in Norfolk, England. It was closed for passengers in 1953.

Former Services

Preceding station	Disused railways	Following station
Tivetshall	Great Eastern Railway; Waveney Valley Line	Pulham St Mary
