= Redenhall with Harleston =

Civil parish in Norfolk, England

Coordinates: 52.4°N 1.3°E

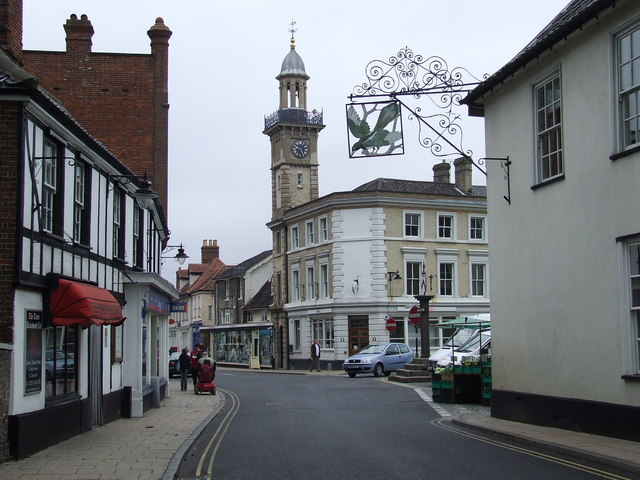
- Harleston Clock Tower

- Location within Norfolk
- Area: 13.73 km^{2} (5.30 sq mi)
- Population: 4,641 (2011)
  - Density: 338/km^{2} (880/sq mi)
- OS grid reference: TM245829
- Civil parish: Redenhall with Harleston
- District: South Norfolk
- Shire county: Norfolk
- Region: East
- Country: England
- Sovereign state: United Kingdom
- Post town: HARLESTON
- Postcode district: IP20
- Dialling code: 01379
- Police: Norfolk
- Fire: Norfolk
- Ambulance: East of England
- UK Parliament: Waveney Valley

Redenhall with Harleston is a civil parish in the South Norfolk district of the English county of Norfolk, comprising the town of Harleston and the neighbouring village of Redenhall. It covers an area of 13.73 km^{2} (5.30 sq mi), and had a population of 4,058 in 1,841 households at the 2001 census, the population increasing to 4,640 at the 2011 census.

== History ==
Many Georgian residences and much earlier buildings, with Georgian frontages, line the streets of Harleston.

The village of Redenhall was mentioned in the Domesday Book, as part of the Lands of the King that Godric holds, in the Half Hundred of Earsham. It states that in King Edward the Confessor' time, Rada the Dane held Redenhall, and that his holding was roughly 700 acres, upon which there were forty subordinate tenantries with six plough-teams. The Domesday Book only makes brief reference to Harleston saying that the Abbot of Bury St. Edmunds was lord here then.

The parish includes two Church of England churches. In the town centre is the church of St John the Baptist, the present building being completed in 1872. The town's landmark clock tower, was designed and commissioned in 1876 from George Grimwood of Weybread, at a cost of £325 whilst the clock itself was supplied and fitted by Messers Gillet & Bland of Croydon at a cost of £90. The tower is on the edge of the site of the old chapel of ease, demolished in 1873, to the much larger medieval Church of the Assumption of the Blessed Virgin Mary in Redenhall, the mother church of the parish.

Redenhall and Harleston railway stations previously connected these settlements by rail with Tivetshall St Margaret and Beccles on the Waveney Valley Line. Redenhall Station closed in 1866, and Harleston in 1953; the whole railway line has been taken up.

Harleston Sancroft Academy is located in Harleston, and is the main state-funded school for the parish and surrounding area.

== Governance ==
The civil parish has a town council.

== Notable people ==
- Samuel Fuller, a Pilgrim on the Mayflower
- Edward Fuller, a Pilgrim on the Mayflower
- Henry Ward, recipient of the Victoria Cross
