= Church of the Assumption of the Blessed Virgin Mary, Redenhall =

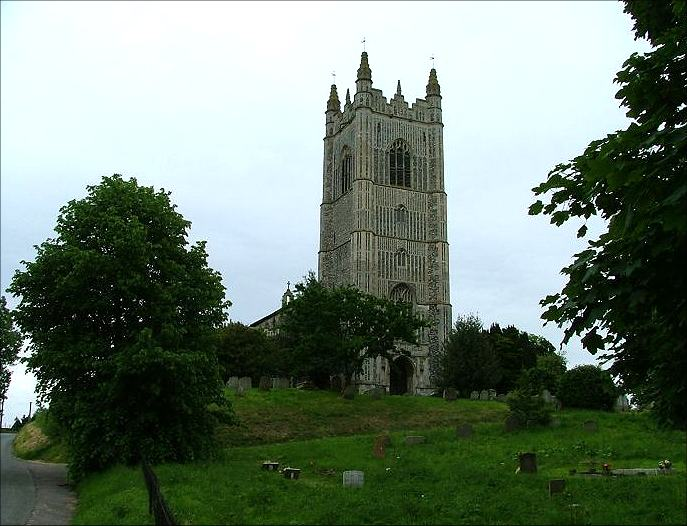
- St Mary's Church, Redenhall
- Church of the Assumption of the Blessed Virgin Mary, Redenhall
- 52°24.67105′N 1°19.61998′E
- Location: Redenhall
- Country: England
- Denomination: Church of England
- Website: http://www.7churches.org.uk/

History
- Dedication: Assumption of Mary

Architecture
- Heritage designation: Grade I listed
- Style: Perpendicular
- Groundbreaking: 1326
- Completed: 1518

Specifications
- Length: 137 feet (42 m)
- Width: 59 feet (18 m)
- Height: 106 feet (32 m)

Administration
- Province: Canterbury
- Diocese: Diocese of Norwich
- Archdeaconry: Norfolk
- Deanery: Redenhall
- Parish: Redenhall with Harleston and Wortwell

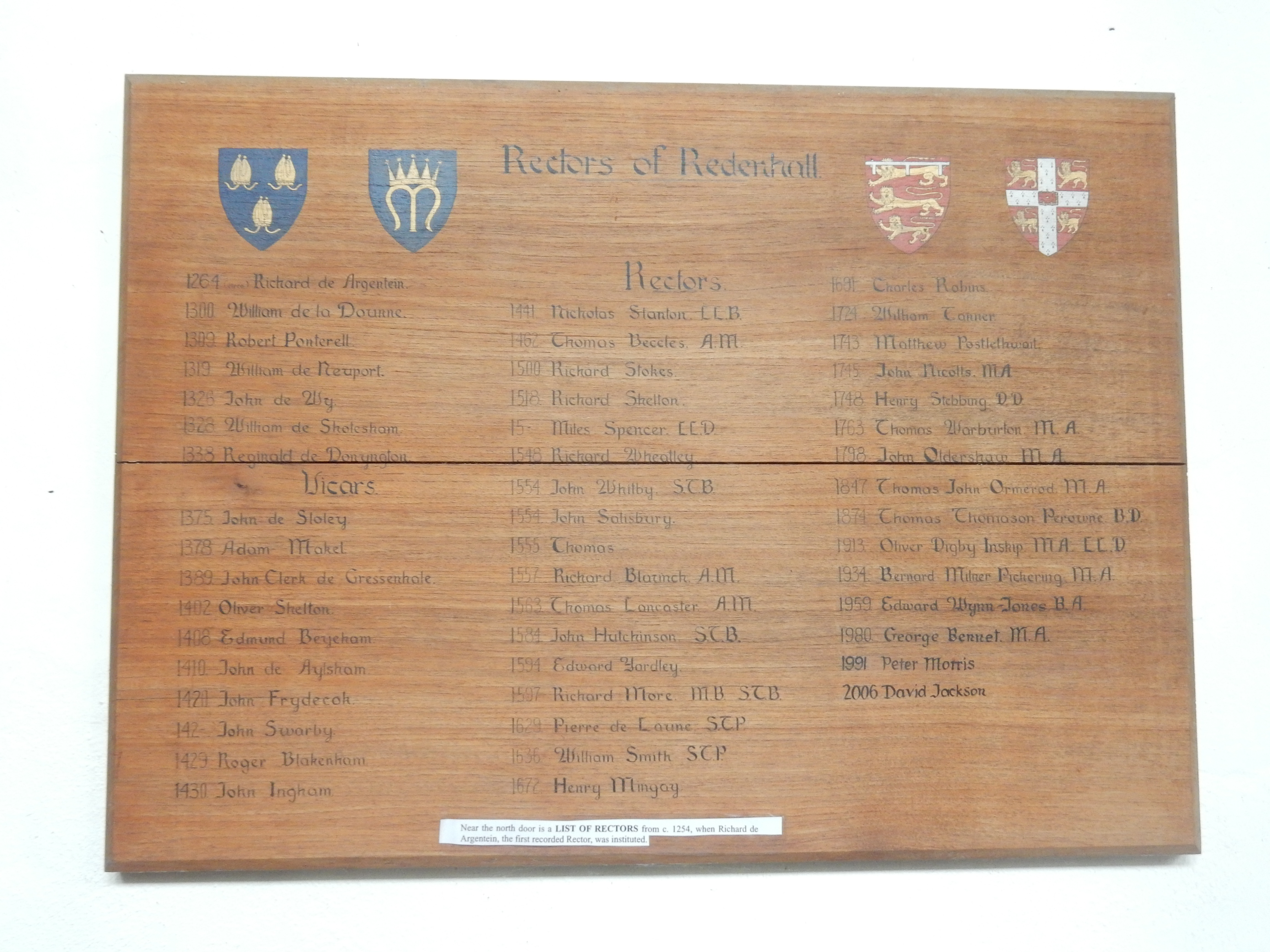
Plate Listing the Rectors of Redenhall Church from 1264 - 2006

The Church of the Assumption of the Blessed Virgin Mary, Redenhall (St. Mary's Church) is a Grade I listed parish church in the Church of England in Redenhall, Norfolk. It is the mother church of the large ecclesiastical parish of Redenhall-cum-Harleston and Wortwell, with the smaller church of St John the Baptist in Harleston originally being a chapel of ease to Redenhall.

== History ==
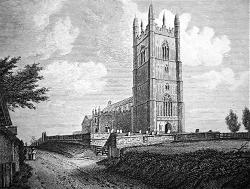
Engraving of Redenhall Church from 1819 by Thomas Higham

The site of St Mary's, Redenhall has been used for worship for around 1000 years or more, with the lines of an earlier round-tower church of Saxon or Norman date discovered in 1858 beneath the nave arcades and chancel step when a new heating system was being installed.

The chancel is the oldest part of the present building, dating from the early 1300s and possibly built as an addition to an earlier church. Maintenance of the chancel was responsibility of the rector, the present chancel's benefactor reported to be William de Neuport (rector 1319–26). The 15th and 16th Centuries saw a period of grand church building and rebuilding throughout East Anglia, the present nave and aisles dating from this time. Construction of the crowning glory of the church, its magnificent tower, was started in c.1460, with several bequests for its construction being received between 1469 - 1514. The tower is 106 feet (32 metres) high to the top of the pinnacles.
