= Starston railway station =

Disused railway station in Norfolk, England

Coordinates: 52.4083°N 1.2833°E

Starston
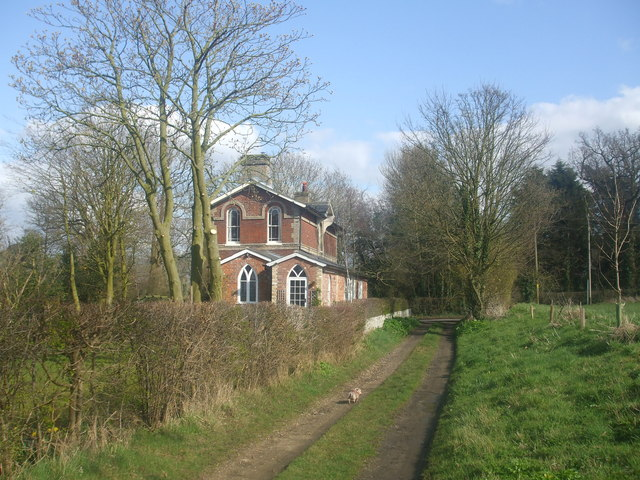
- The station today

General information
- Location: Starston, South Norfolk, Norfolk; England
- Grid reference: TM233839
- Platforms: 1

Other information
- Status: Disused

History
- Pre-grouping: Waveney Valley Railway; Great Eastern Railway

Key dates
- 1 December 1855: Opened
- 1 August 1866: Closed
Location

Starston was a railway station on the Waveney Valley Line in Norfolk, England. It was open for just ten years before low traffic usage caused its closure in 1866 nearly a century before the rest of the line. It is now a cottage.

Former Services

Preceding station	Disused railways	Following station
Pulham St Mary	Great Eastern Railway; Waveney Valley Line	Harleston
