= Earsham Hall =

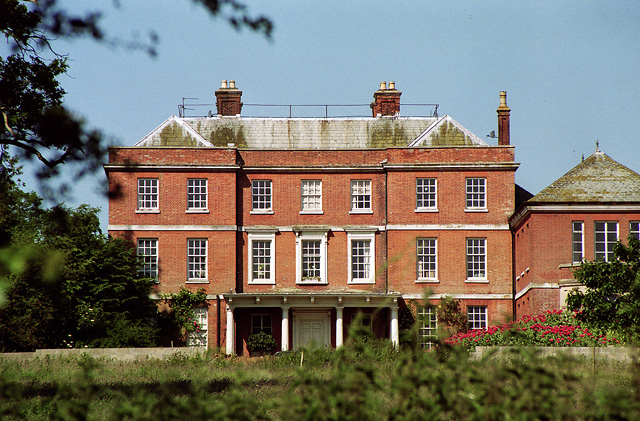

- Location within Norfolk

General information
- Type: Country house
- Architectural style: Georgian
- Location: Earsham, United Kingdom
- Coordinates: 52.4578°N 1.3959°E
- Completed: c.1707

Design and construction
- Architect: John Buxton

Earsham House is a Georgian country house near the village of Earsham, Norfolk. It is a Grade II* listed building.

The house is built in three storeys of red brick with a parapet and a slate hipped roof. It has a symmetrical 7-bay frontage, the middle 3 bays of which are recessed and fronted by a porch. A wing to the north-east contains the Duke of Cumberland's Dining Room. Other service wings are attached.

== History ==
The site was originally occupied by large timber-framed buildings which were later encased in brick and are now subsidiary blocks to the present main hall.

The present main hall was built attached to the previous buildings around 1707 by amateur architect John Buxton (1685–1731), who then sold it to Colonel William Windham in 1721. Windham had made a fortune during the South Sea Bubble and became the MP for Sudbury in 1722 and for Aldeburgh in 1727. It passed to his son William who served the Duke of Cumberland and was also an MP for Aldeburg and for Helston. He employed the architect Sir John Soane around 1784 to make a number of substantial improvements, primarily to the interior, but also to convert the detached Orangery into a Music Room.

On William junior's death in 1789 the hall transferred to his nephew Joseph Wyndham-Bower and ultimately to Sir William Windham Dalling, 2nd Baronet (High Sheriff of Norfolk in 1819) and then to the Meade family. In 1920, it was leased to Americans Cecil Henry Oliverson and his sister.

From 1948 to 1973 the hall was leased as a boarding and day school for boys. After the closure of the school the building was sold by auction in 1973 and fell into a state of disrepair. It was bought in 1976 by the present owners, the Derham family, who have refurbished it and made it self-supporting by the hosting of events and weddings as well as the sale of antiques.
