= Ditchingham railway station =

Former railway station in England

Coordinates: 52.4646°N 1.4474°E

Ditchingham
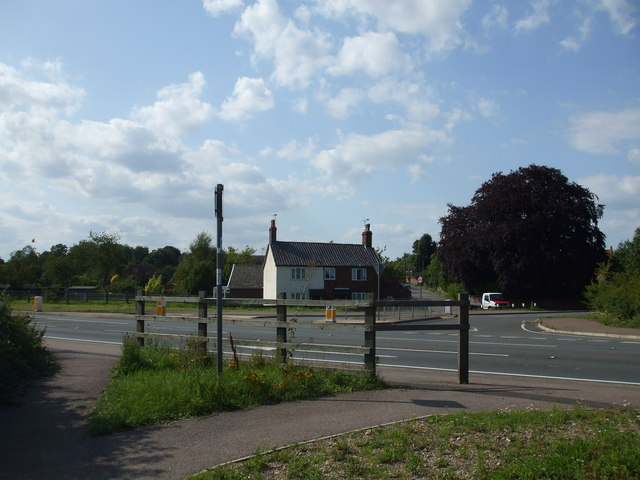
- The site today

General information
- Location: Ditchingham, South Norfolk, Norfolk; England
- Grid reference: TM342907
- Platforms: 1

Other information
- Status: Disused

History
- Pre-grouping: Waveney Valley Railway; Great Eastern Railway
- Post-grouping: London and North Eastern Railway; Eastern Region of British Railways

Key dates
- 2 March 1863: Opened
- 5 January 1953: Closed to passengers
- 19 April 1965: Closed to freight
Location

Ditchingham was a railway station in Ditchingham, Norfolk on the Waveney Valley Line. Opened on 2 March 1863, it closed to passengers along with the rest of the line in 1953.

Former Services

Preceding station	Disused railways	Following station
Bungay	Great Eastern Railway; Waveney Valley Line	Ellingham
