= Burston railway station =

Disused railway station in England

Coordinates: 52.40519°N 1.15142°E

Burston
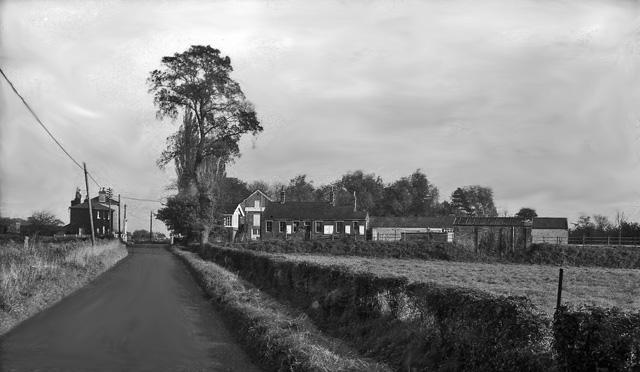
- Burston station in 1966, ten days before closure

General information
- Location: Burston, South Norfolk; England
- Grid reference: TM144832
- Platforms: 2

Other information
- Status: Disused

History
- Pre-grouping: Eastern Union Railway; Great Eastern Railway
- Post-grouping: London and North Eastern Railway; Eastern Region of British Railways

Key dates
- 2 July 1849: Opened
- 7 November 1966: Closed
Location

Burston railway station was on the Diss to Norwich line and served the village of Burston, Norfolk. Only the station building remains; the signal box has been removed and very little evidence of the platforms or sidings exist. A cottage between the railway line and the station master's house was also demolished.

The railway line still passes through it on a level crossing.

== Former services ==
Preceding station	Disused railways	Following station
Tivetshall	Great Eastern Railway; Great Eastern Main Line	Diss
