= Harleston railway station =

Disused railway station in Norfolk, England

Coordinates: 52.4059°N 1.3020°E

Harleston
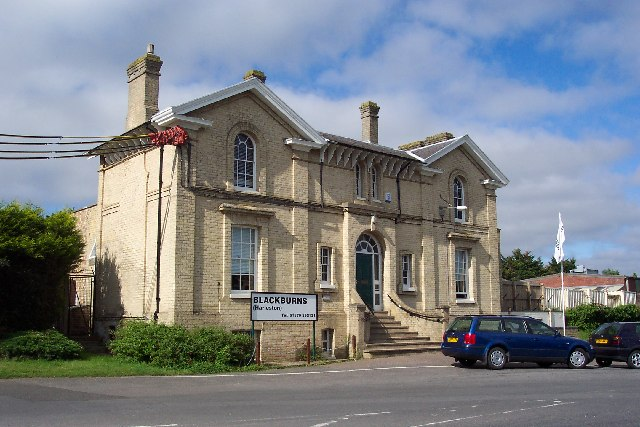

General information
- Location: Harleston, South Norfolk, Norfolk; England
- Grid reference: TM249839
- Platforms: 2

Other information
- Status: Disused

History
- Pre-grouping: Waveney Valley Railway; Great Eastern Railway
- Post-grouping: London and North Eastern Railway; Eastern Region of British Railways

Key dates
- 1 December 1855: Opened
- 5 January 1953: Closed to passengers
- 18 April 1966: Closed to freight
Location

Harleston was a railway station in Harleston, Norfolk, on the Waveney Valley Line. It was an early post-war closure; passenger services on this line were withdrawn in 1953 with goods trains lasting until the complete closure of the line in 1966.

Preceding station	Disused railways	Following station
Starston	Great Eastern Railway; Waveney Valley Line	Redenhall
