= Tivetshall railway station =

Former railway station in Norfolk, England

Coordinates: 52.4472°N 1.1747°E

Tivetshall
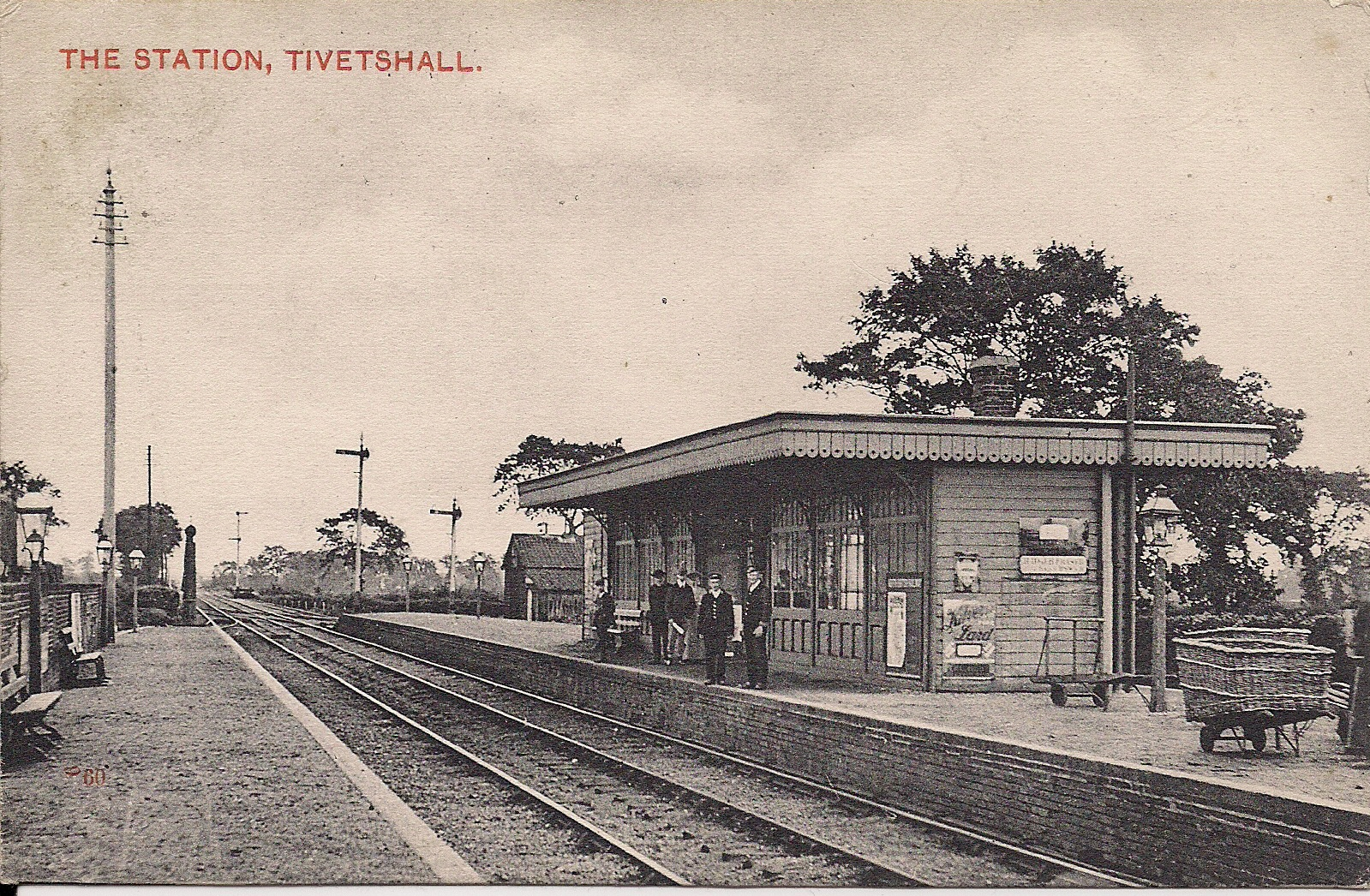

General information
- Location: Tivetshall St Margaret, South Norfolk; England
- Grid reference: TM157879
- Platforms: 3

Other information
- Status: Disused

History
- Pre-grouping: Eastern Union Railway; Great Eastern Railway
- Post-grouping: London and North Eastern Railway; Eastern Region of British Railways

Key dates
- 12 December 1849: Opened
- 18 April 1966: Closed to freight
- 7 November 1966: Closed to passengers
Location

Tivetshall was a railway station on the Great Eastern Main Line located in Tivetshall, Norfolk, England. It was also the western terminus of the Waveney Valley Line from Beccles. It served six small parishes in an agricultural area.

== History ==
=== Design and opening ===
It was first opened when Norwich and London were connected by the Eastern Union Railway in 1849. The EUR was taken over by the Eastern Counties Railway before becoming the Great Eastern Railway in 1862. The station building, located on the down side of the main line, was believed to have been designed by Frederick Barnes, who was responsible for designing a number of other stations at this time in East Anglia.

=== 19th century ===
In 1855, the Waveney Valley Line was opened as far as Harleston; it was extended to Bungay in 1860 and finally on to Beccles.

A new signal box was provided in 1880 and this lasted 106 years. Immediately south of the station was a level crossing, which spanned all three tracks (the two main lines and platform road for the Waveney Valley line). A small goods yard was provided north of the station on the down side of the line and a small maltings (operated by Watney Combe & Reid in the 1960s) was also served by rail.

In the 1880s, there were four main line trains each way serving Tivetshall and five trains serving the Waveney Valley line. In 1881, the GER built a timber waiting room on the up side of the station.

Water troughs were installed near Tivetshall station in 1896, which allowed trains to pick up water without stopping. These were taken out of service in 1945, but the station had three water cranes.

=== 20th century ===
On 31 August 1907, Arthur Hardiment attempted to save an 18-month-old toddler from an oncoming express train. Hardiment managed to clear the toddler but was struck and injured by the engine. For this action, he was awarded the Albert Medal Second Class for gallantry, receiving his award at Windsor Castle from King Edward VII on 13 November the same year.

In 1923, the operation of Tivetshall station was taken over by the London and North Eastern Railway. Some additional sidings were added during the Second World War for traffic to local airfields.

Following nationalisation in 1948, the station became part of the Eastern Region of British Railways.

In the early 1950s, there were eight main line trains each way serving Tivetshall and seven trains serving the Waveney Valley line.

== Decline and closure ==
Passenger services on the Waveney Valley line ceased in 1953; goods services continued on the line until 1966.

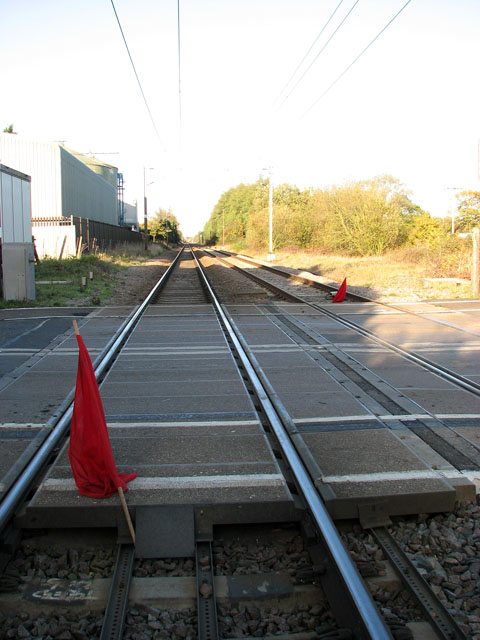
Station site in 2009.

1966 also saw an end to the local main line freight services in April and, with the withdrawal of the local Ipswich to Norwich passenger service, the station closed on 7 November.

The signal box survived for a further twenty years but, following re-signalling and electrification of the line, this closed. At this same time, the remaining station buildings were demolished, although the goods shed was retained and remains in use (as of 2026) by an engineering company. Another survivor is a buffer stop within the grounds of the adjacent Tivetshall Telephone Exchange.

== Former services ==
| Preceding station | Disused railways | Following station |
|---|---|---|
| Forncett | Great Eastern Railway; Great Eastern Main Line | Burston |
| Terminus | Great Eastern Railway; Waveney Valley Line | Pulham Market |
