= Waveney Valley =

UK Parliament constituency (since 2024)

Coordinates: 52.47°N 1.71°E

- County constituency for the House of Commons
- Interactive map of boundaries since 2024
- Location within the East of England
- County: Norfolk and Suffolk
- Electorate: 70,540 (March 2020)
- Major settlements: Bungay, Diss, Eye, Halesworth, Harleston

Current constituency
- Created: 2024
- Member of Parliament: Adrian Ramsay (Green)
- Seats: One
- Created from: Waveney; Central Suffolk and North Ipswich; Bury St. Edmunds; Suffolk Coastal & South Norfolk

Waveney Valley is a constituency represented in the House of Commons of the UK Parliament. It was created following the 2023 review of Westminster constituencies. Since its first election in 2024, it has been represented by Adrian Ramsay of the Green Party, thus becoming the first Green seat in the East of England.

== Boundaries ==
The constituency straddles the River Waveney between Norfolk and Suffolk and is composed of the following (as they existed on 1 December 2020):

- The District of East Suffolk wards of: Bungay & Wainford; Halesworth & Blything.
- The District of Mid Suffolk wards of: Bacton; Eye; Fressingfield; Gislingham; Haughley, Stowupland & Wetherden; Hoxne & Worlingworth; Mendlesham; Palgrave; Rickinghall; Stradbroke & Laxfield; Walsham-le-Willows.
- The District of South Norfolk wards of: Beck Vale, Dickleburgh & Scole; Bressingham & Burston; Bunwell; Diss & Roydon; Ditchingham & Earsham; Harleston.

It covers the following areas:

- Areas to the north of the river, including Diss and Harleston, transferred from South Norfolk
- Bungay, transferred from Waveney (renamed Lowestoft)
- Halesworth, transferred from Suffolk Coastal
- Rural areas of north Suffolk, including Eye, transferred from Central Suffolk and North Ipswich, and Bury St Edmunds (renamed Bury St Edmunds and Stowmarket)

The seat was created from parts of five pre-2024 constituencies:

Contributions of pre-2024 constituencies to Waveney Valley constituency
Pre-2024 constituency	Pre-2024 party	%age area of new constituency	%age population of new constituency
South Norfolk	Conservative	30.9%	41.1%
Central Suffolk and North Ipswich	Conservative	30.8%	20.5%
Bury St Edmunds	Conservative	18.6%	19.6%
Waveney	Conservative	14.0%	9.9%
Suffolk Coastal	Conservative	5.7%	9.8%

The notional 2019 result as predicted by British academics Rallings and Thrasher for the revised constituency was calculated to be a Conservative victory.

== Constituency profile ==
Electoral Calculus characterised the proposed seat as "Strong Right", with right-wing economic and social views, high home ownership levels and strong support for Brexit.

The seat was a target seat, in the 2024 general election, for the Green Party who won half of the council wards in the seat in the 2023 local elections and who ultimately won the seat.

== Members of Parliament ==
Election	Member	Party
2024	Adrian Ramsay	Green

== Elections ==
=== Elections in the 2020s ===
General election 2024: Waveney Valley
Party	Candidate	Votes	%	±%
Green	Adrian Ramsay	20,467	41.7	+32.4
Conservative	Richard Rout	14,873	30.3	−31.9
Reform	Scott Huggins	7,779	15.9	N/A
Labour	Gurpreet Padda	4,621	9.4	−9.2
Liberal Democrats	John Shreeve	1,214	2.5	−6.7
SDP	Maya Severyn	118	0.2	N/A
Majority		5,594	11.4	N/A
Turnout		49,072	67.2	−5.5
Green win (new seat)				

=== Elections in the 2010s ===
2019 notional result
Party	Vote	%
Conservative	31,898	62.2
Labour	9,534	18.6
Green	4,775	9.3
Liberal Democrats	4,696	9.2
Others	377	0.7
Turnout	51,280	72.7
Electorate	70,540	

== Constituency level polling ==
Dates conducted	Pollster	Client	Sample size	Con.	Lab.	Lib. Dems	Green	Ref.	Others	Lead
4 Jul 2024	2024 general election		–	30.3%	9.4%	2.5%	41.7%	15.8%	0.2%	11.4
6–14 Jun 2024	We Think	The Green Party	500	24%	17%	7%	37%	16%	–	13

== See also ==
- List of parliamentary constituencies in Norfolk
- List of parliamentary constituencies in Suffolk
- List of parliamentary constituencies in the East of England (region)
