= Waveney Valley line =

Railway branch line

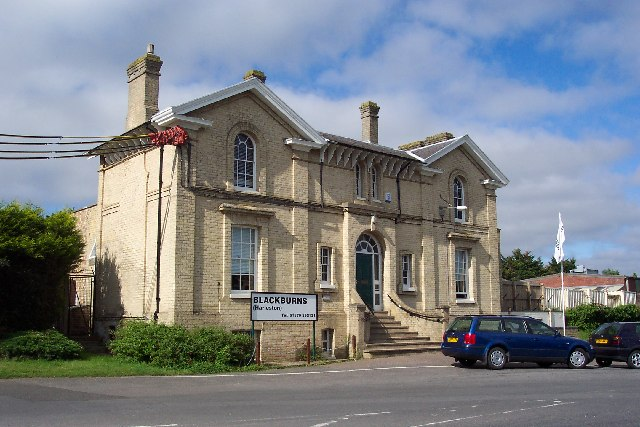
Harleston Station

The Waveney Valley line was a branch line running from Tivetshall in Norfolk to Beccles in Suffolk connecting the Great Eastern Main Line at Tivetshall with the East Suffolk line at Beccles. It provided services to Norwich, Great Yarmouth, Lowestoft, Ipswich and many other towns in Suffolk with additional services to London. It was named after the River Waveney which follows a similar route.

== History ==
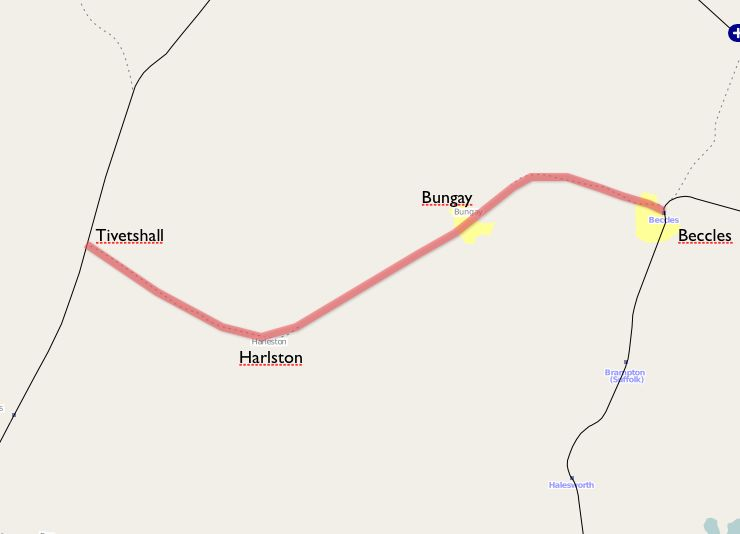

Waveney Valley Railway Act 1851
- Act of Parliament
- Parliament of the United Kingdom
- Long title: An Act for constructing a Railway from the Tivetshall Station of the Eastern Union Railway to Bungay in Suffolk.
- Citation: 14 & 15 Vict. c. lxvi

Dates
- Royal assent: 3 July 1851

Other legislation
- Repealed by: Great Eastern Railway (Additional Powers) Act 1863

Status: Repealed

Text of statute as originally enacted

Waveney Valley Railway Extension Act 1853
- Act of Parliament
- Parliament of the United Kingdom
- Long title: An Act to enable the Waveney Valley Railway Company to extend their Railway from Bungay to Beccles.
- Citation: 16 & 17 Vict. c. cxliv

Dates
- Royal assent: 4 August 1853

Other legislation
- Repealed by: Great Eastern Railway Act 1862

Status: Repealed

Text of statute as originally enacted

Waveney Valley Railway Act 1855
- Act of Parliament
- Parliament of the United Kingdom
- Long title: An Act for extending the Times granted to purchase Lands for the Part of the Waveney Valley Railway between Bungay and Beccles.
- Citation: 18 & 19 Vict. c. clvii

Dates
- Royal assent: 23 July 1855

Other legislation
- Repealed by: Great Eastern Railway (Additional Powers) Act 1863

Status: Repealed

Text of statute as originally enacted

Waveney Valley Railway Amendment Act 1856
- Act of Parliament
- Parliament of the United Kingdom
- Long title: An Act to revive and extend certain of the Powers of the Waveney Valley Railway Company with relation to their Railway.
- Citation: 19 & 20 Vict. c. cxxix

Dates
- Royal assent: 29 July 1856

Other legislation
- Repealed by: Great Eastern Railway (Additional Powers) Act 1863

Status: Repealed

Text of statute as originally enacted

Waveney Valley Railway Act 1859
- Act of Parliament
- Parliament of the United Kingdom
- Long title: An Act to enable the Waveney Valley Railway Company to extend their Railway from Harleston to Bungay and Ditchingham; and for other Purposes relating to the same Company.
- Citation: 22 & 23 Vict. c. cxv

Dates
- Royal assent: 13 August 1859

Other legislation
- Repealed by: Great Eastern Railway (Additional Powers) Act 1863

Status: Repealed

Waveney Valley Railway Act 1860
- Act of Parliament
- Parliament of the United Kingdom
- Long title: An Act for the Extension of the Waveney Valley Railway from Bungay to Beccles in Suffolk.
- Citation: 23 & 24 Vict. c. clvii

Dates
- Royal assent: 23 July 1860

Text of statute as originally enacted

Waveney Valley Railway Act 1861
- Act of Parliament
- Parliament of the United Kingdom
- Long title: An Act to grant further Powers to the Waveney Valley Railway Company as to their Capital.
- Citation: 24 & 25 Vict. c. clxxi

Dates
- Royal assent: 22 July 1861

Other legislation
- Repealed by: Great Eastern Railway (Additional Powers) Act 1863

Status: Repealed

The line was authorised by the Waveney Valley Railway Act 1851 (14 & 15 Vict. c. lxvi) on 3 July 1851. The line opened in stages, firstly from Tivetshall to Harleston on 1 December 1855, then to Bungay on 2 November 1860, and finally to Beccles. When the line was completed it was incorporated into the Great Eastern Railway. The line then became part of the LNER on 1 January 1923.

Starston and Redenhall stations were closed in 1866, only 11 years after the line opened.

Early services on the line were worked by the company's only locomotive named Perseverance. This was a 2-2-2T locomotive built by Sharp Stewart and Co (Manchester). It did not perform particularly well and was rebuilt by the GER in 1864 as a 2-4-0T. Withdrawal was in 1880/1 and the locomotive was broken up in November 1881.

Some old pictures show the following classes of engine that worked over the route:

- GER Class Y14 - later LNER classification J15. 0-6-0 tender locomotive built by the GER
- GER Class T26 - later LNER classification E4. 2-4-0 tender locomotive built by the GER
- GER Class M15 - later LNER classification F4. 2-4-2 tank locomotive built by the GER
- GER Class C32 - later LNER classification F3. 2-4-2 tank locomotive built by the GER

The line was closed to passenger services on 5 January 1953, with the last passenger train running from Tivetshall junction to Beccles, pulled by ex-LNER class F3 No. 67128.

A light railway order was obtained in November 1954, after which there were some special services run by railway enthusiasts.

From 1960 the line was split into sections – Tivetshall to Harleston and Beccles to Bungay.

The lines were finally closed from 19 April 1966 during the Beeching Axe and the track eventually removed. Some of the last wagon loads to leave Ditchingham were sand and gravel from Broome Heath, used in the construction of Hammersmith fly-over in west London.

In the early 1980s, many of the remaining old buildings, including stations and goods yards, were demolished to make way for a new road (the A143).

== Services ==
The line ran regular passenger and freight services daily, except for Sundays. This was a condition placed on the railway by landowners in the Starston area of Norfolk who had to give their consent before the line could be built.

Departing from Beccles there were stations at Geldeston, Ellingham, Ditchingham, Bungay, Earsham, Homersfield, Harleston, Pulham St. Mary, and Pulham Market before the line terminated at Tivetshall.

During World War I, however, troop trains were known to operate each day. By October 1915, trains had reached their peak of 8 trains per day, but the demands of the war reduced this to 6 trains per day in 1917.

During World War II, there was a large increase in traffic. This was due to the airfields and military establishments being built along the line. Bombs were stored on a bomb dump near Earsham Hall until, after the war, the unused bombs were taken away and disposed of; this continued until 1954.

By 1953, when passenger services ceased, services had remained unchanged for 36 years.

== Accidents ==
The following are rarely documented accidents that occurred on the Waveney Valley railway:

Beccles and Bungay Weekly News 9 March 1863

Reports of what was probably the first accident on the Bungay/Beccles section happened on the 4:50 pm Bungay–Beccles train.

"When going over the bridge on the Bungay side of the factory, the engine lost the metals, dragging with it eleven tracks and two Passenger Cars for about seventy yards, when it ran off the embankment with some of the coaches."

"Bungay Station: Killed on the Railway" – (Unknown Date)

"On Thursday an inquest was held at the Kings Head Hotel by H.E Garrod, Esq., Diss, coroner for the liberty of the Duke of Norfolk, on the Body of Frederick William Skipper, aged 23 Years, porter of the railway station, who was killed the same morning. Mr. John Haythorpe, station master, deposed that at twenty minutes to eleven he was on the platform, and saw an engine taking some goods trucks on to the siding. The deceased duty was to assist in the operation. He could not see him from where he (Witness) Stood as the trucks took a curve. The duty of a porter was to keep outside the trucks when being shunted. There was an eye on the side of the truck to which the rope should be hooked. After the engine parted with the trucks, Kerrison, the foreman/porter called to him and Haythorpe went and saw the deceased lying across the rail apparently dead. Skipper was generally described as a "Careful" Man. But the evidence of Kerrison, Foreman/Porter, went to show that the rope was attached to the engine, and the other end to the front of the trucks to the couplings between the buffers. Skipper put it there instead of on the side where there was an eye on purpose for it. When the engine got forward of the trucks the rope became tight. Skipper was between the truck and the rope. The rope broke and Skipper was seen to fall across the metals, and five trucks passed over his body. No-one was to blame except the deceased, who should have put the hook on the eye of the truck. Other evidence being given, the jury returned the verdict of "Accidental Death."

"Shocking Death at The Railway Station" – (Unknown Date)

"A shocking affair occurred at the Harleston Railway Station on Monday Morning. An elderly man named Henry Baxter, living at Harleston, was trespassing in the station yard, and while leaning against the new cattle pen walls, next to the metals, was accidentally killed, being crushed against the wall by a Ballast Train, which was shunting. An inquest was held at the Railway Tavern on Monday Afternoon, before H.E Garrod, Esq., of Diss, coroner, and a verdict of "Accidental Death" Returned."

== Present day ==
The Bungay to Harleston section of the route now forms part of the main A143 road and was opened on 9 November 1983. Other sections of the route are now tracks and footpaths.

The line from Beccles station was partly converted to an industrial estate, reaching the river next to the aptly named Railway Score. The remains of the bridge over the River Waveney on the Norfolk side of the river are still visible. From the bridge, the trackbed is in overgrown condition and the ballast is still present in places. At Ditchingham, the former Silk Mill, later The Maltings served by the railway still survives following redevelopment in 2015 as the Waterside housing development.

Several stations do survive including:

- Geldeston - The station building and goods shed survive and are in use as a private residence with a small extension, otherwise as it was.
- Ellingham - A large extension has altered the image greatly, some of the platform also survives.
- Earsham - The station building survives in a very unaltered state, only the canopy is missing and a few door changes.
- Homersfield - The station buildings demolished but the goods shed is in use as a garage and house, with few extensions.
- Harleston - The station buildings and goods shed survive, being owned by a builder, extension on the station extends over the platform.
- Starston - The station buildings survive, very well maintained.
- Pulham Market - The station buildings survive and are in use as a private residence, signal added.

The water tower from Bungay was saved and taken to the North Norfolk Railway and placed at Weybourne where it is the largest object from the line still in railway use.

== Bibliography ==
- Adderson, Richard (2004). Tivetshall to Beccles: The Waveney Valley line. Middleton Press. ISBN 978-1-904474-41-8.
