= Stanhoe railway station =

Former railway station in Norfolk, England

Coordinates: 52.9143°N 0.6735°E

Stanhoe
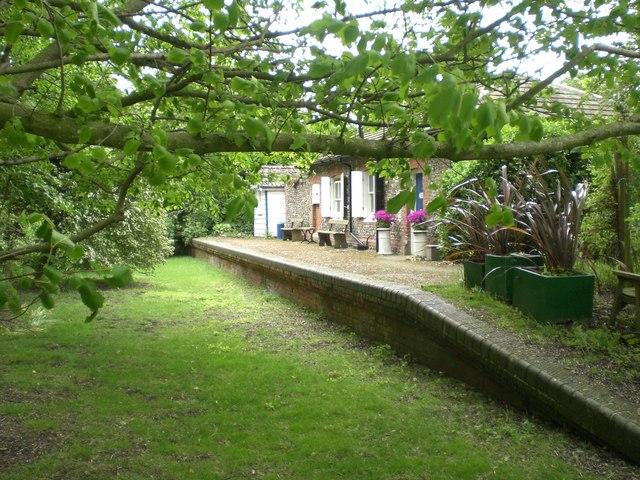

General information
- Location: Stanhoe, King's Lynn and West Norfolk, Norfolk; England
- Grid reference: TF798386
- Platforms: 1

Other information
- Status: Disused

History
- Original company: West Norfolk Junction Railway
- Pre-grouping: Great Eastern Railway
- Post-grouping: London and North Eastern Railway; Eastern Region of British Railways

Key dates
- 17 August 1866: Opened
- 2 June 1952: Closed
Location

Stanhoe was a railway station which served the village of Stanhoe in Norfolk, England. Opened by the West Norfolk Junction Railway in 1866, it closed to passengers in 1952.

== History ==
The construction of the West Norfolk Junction Railway was prompted by the success of the Lynn and Hunstanton Railway which had opened in 1862 to link King's Lynn with the seaside town of Hunstanton. The West Norfolk opened in 1866 at the start of a major financial crisis triggered by the collapse of Overend Gurney Bank; the year also saw the outbreak of a "cattle plague" in North Norfolk which impacted on the cattle receipts on the line. The West Norfolk was absorbed into the Lynn and Hunstanton Railway in 1872 which in turn was acquired by the Great Eastern Railway in 1890. The line eventually closed to passengers in 1952, a consequence of rising costs and falling passenger numbers, aggravated by the inconvenient siting of stations. Up to the end of its passenger services, the line was one of the last where one could travel in gas-lit clerestory coaches hauled by Victorian locomotives.

A freight service continued to operate until 1963, though it was cut back to Heacham/Burnham Market after the North Sea flood of 1953 which badly damaged the section between Holkham and Wells, damage which British Railways judged not worth repairing.

Stanhoe station was actually situated more than a mile from the village from which it took its name; its remote rural location was accentuated by the fact that it lay at a height of around 200 ft above sea level. With no goods facilities provided, the station had one of the simplest layouts on the line; a single platform on the up side on which was built a signal box and single storey station building out of Norfolk flint rather than the usual Great Eastern Carstone. A level crossing lay to the west while the line climbed to the west, running parallel with a minor road before crossing it on a level about a mile from Docking.

Preceding station	Disused railways	Following station
Docking; Line and station closed	British Railways; Eastern Region; Heacham to Wells line	Burnham Market; Line and station closed

== Present day ==
The station now forms part of "Station Farm", which has been owned by the same person for the last 40 years; the buildings have been well preserved and in particular the station has retained its station signs and lamps.

== See also ==
- List of closed railway stations in Norfolk
- Stanhoe station on 1946 navigable map
