= Sedgeford railway station =

Former railway station in Norfolk, England

Coordinates: 52.9069°N 0.5429°E

Sedgeford
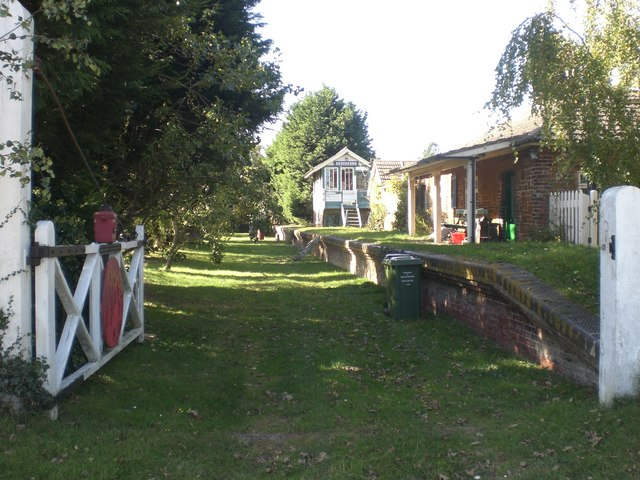
- Main station building converted into a residence.

General information
- Location: Sedgeford, King's Lynn and West Norfolk, Norfolk; England
- Grid reference: TF710373
- Platforms: 1

Other information
- Status: Disused (private home)

History
- Original company: West Norfolk Junction Railway
- Pre-grouping: Great Eastern Railway
- Post-grouping: London and North Eastern Railway; Eastern Region of British Railways

Key dates
- 17 August 1866: Opened
- 2 June 1952: Closed for passengers
- 28 December 1964: closed for goods
Location

Sedgeford was a railway station which served the village of Sedgeford in Norfolk, England. Opened by the West Norfolk Junction Railway in 1866, passenger services ceased with the line in 1952.

== History ==
The construction of the West Norfolk Junction Railway was prompted by the success of the Lynn and Hunstanton Railway which had opened in 1862 to link King's Lynn with the seaside town of Hunstanton. The West Norfolk opened in 1866 at the start of a major financial crisis triggered by the collapse of Overend Gurney Bank; the year also saw the outbreak of a "cattle plague" in North Norfolk which impacted on the cattle receipts on the line. The West Norfolk was absorbed into the Lynn and Hunstanton Railway in 1872 which in turn was acquired by the Great Eastern Railway in 1890. The line eventually closed to passengers in 1952, a consequence of rising costs and falling passenger numbers, aggravated by the inconvenient siting of stations. Up to the end of its passenger services, the line was one of the last where one could travel in gas-lit clerestory coaches hauled by Victorian locomotives.

A freight service continued to operate until 1964, though it was cut back to Heacham/Burnham Market after the North Sea flood of 1953 which badly damaged the section between Holkham and Wells, damage which British Railways judged not worth repairing.

Sedgeford station was the first station after Heacham on the single-track West Norfolk Junction Railway. It was a small station located in a rural area, equipped with a single platform on the down side, built to smaller dimensions to other stations on the Lynn and Hunstanton Railway, and without a stationmaster's residence. Very basic goods facilities were provided in the shape of a single carriage siding on the down side. The station's staff amounted to two persons, reduced to one in the final years. Traffic on the line was largely agricultural, consisting of corn, sugar beet, cattle and agricultural machinery. A level crossing lay to the east of the platform.

Preceding station	Disused railways	Following station
Heacham; Line and station closed	British Railways; Eastern Region; Heacham to Wells line	Docking; Line and station closed

== Present day ==
The station buildings have been particularly well preserved as a private residence, complete with the station sign and Great Eastern Railway notices. The level crossing gate remains with a notice reading "Failure to shut the gate - fine 40/-".

== See also ==
- List of closed railway stations in Norfolk
- Sedgeford station on navigable 1946 O. S. map
