= Burnham Market railway station =

Former railway station in Norfolk, England

Coordinates: 52.943650°N 0.729439°E

Burnham Market
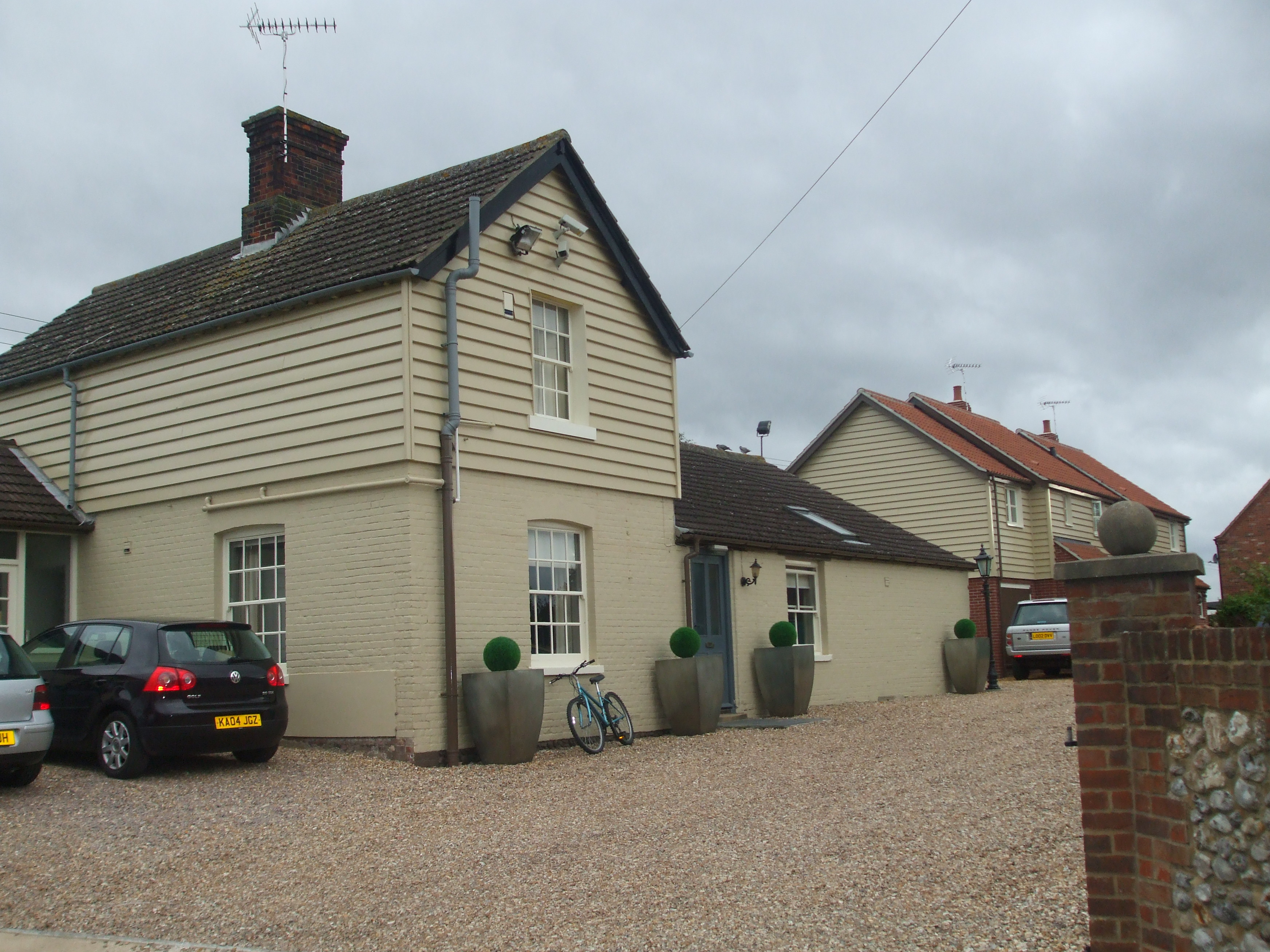

General information
- Location: Burnham Market, King's Lynn and West Norfolk, England
- Grid reference: TF834419
- Platforms: 1

Other information
- Status: Disused

History
- Original company: West Norfolk Junction Railway
- Pre-grouping: Great Eastern Railway
- Post-grouping: London and North Eastern Railway; Eastern Region of British Railways

Key dates
- 17 August 1866: Opened as Burnham
- 1 June 1883: Renamed Burnham Market
- 2 June 1952: Closed for passengers
- 28 December 1964: Closed for goods
Location

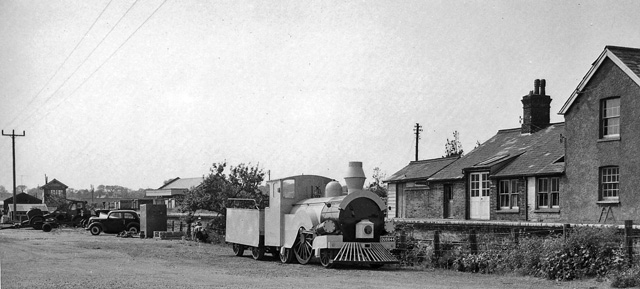
The station in June 1963

Burnham Market (originally Burnham) was a railway station which served the village of Burnham Market, Norfolk, England. Opened by the West Norfolk Junction railway in 1866, it closed with the line in 1952.

== History ==
The construction of the West Norfolk Junction Railway was prompted by the success of the Lynn and Hunstanton Railway which had opened in 1862 to link King's Lynn with the seaside town of Hunstanton. The West Norfolk opened in 1866 at the start of a major financial crisis triggered by the collapse of Overend Gurney Bank; the year also saw the outbreak of a "cattle plague" in North Norfolk, which impacted on the cattle receipts on the line. The West Norfolk was absorbed into the Lynn and Hunstanton Railway in 1872, which in turn was acquired by the Great Eastern Railway in 1890. The line eventually closed to passengers in 1952, a consequence of rising costs and falling passenger numbers, aggravated by the inconvenient siting of stations. Up to the end of its passenger services, the line was one of the last where one could travel in gas lit clerestory coaches hauled by Victorian locomotives.

A freight service continued to operate until 1964, though it was cut back to Heacham/Burnham Market after the North Sea flood of 1953 which badly damaged the section between Holkham and Wells, damage which British Rail judged not worth repairing.

Burnham Market was the principal intermediate station on the West Norfolk branch, serving the largest settlement between Heacham and Wells. Its importance was to decline towards the end of the nineteenth century as it shed its urban functions to become the village it is today. A single platform was provided together with a brick station building situated on the down side of the line. A crossing loop to the west of the station allowing it to be a passing place. Four sidings led from the loop to serve a goods yard equipped with a red brick goods shed. Another siding led to a nearby brickworks which used the railway to import coal. The station, like many others along the line, also handled its fair share of agricultural traffic and, in addition, some fish traffic (notably shellfish) from nearby villages such as Brancaster and Burnham Overy.

The station was also the closest to Horatio Nelson's birthplace at Burnham Thorpe, a fact capitalised on by the Great Eastern Railway, which erected large nameboards proclaiming that this was the station "For Burnham Thorpe & Nelson's Birthplace". That village could be discerned from the train as it passed over the little River Burn within half a mile of Burnham Thorpe church, where Nelson's father was rector from 1755 to 1802.

Preceding station	Disused railways	Following station
Stanhoe; Line and station closed	British Rail; Eastern Region; Heacham to Wells line	Holkham; Line and station closed

== Present day ==
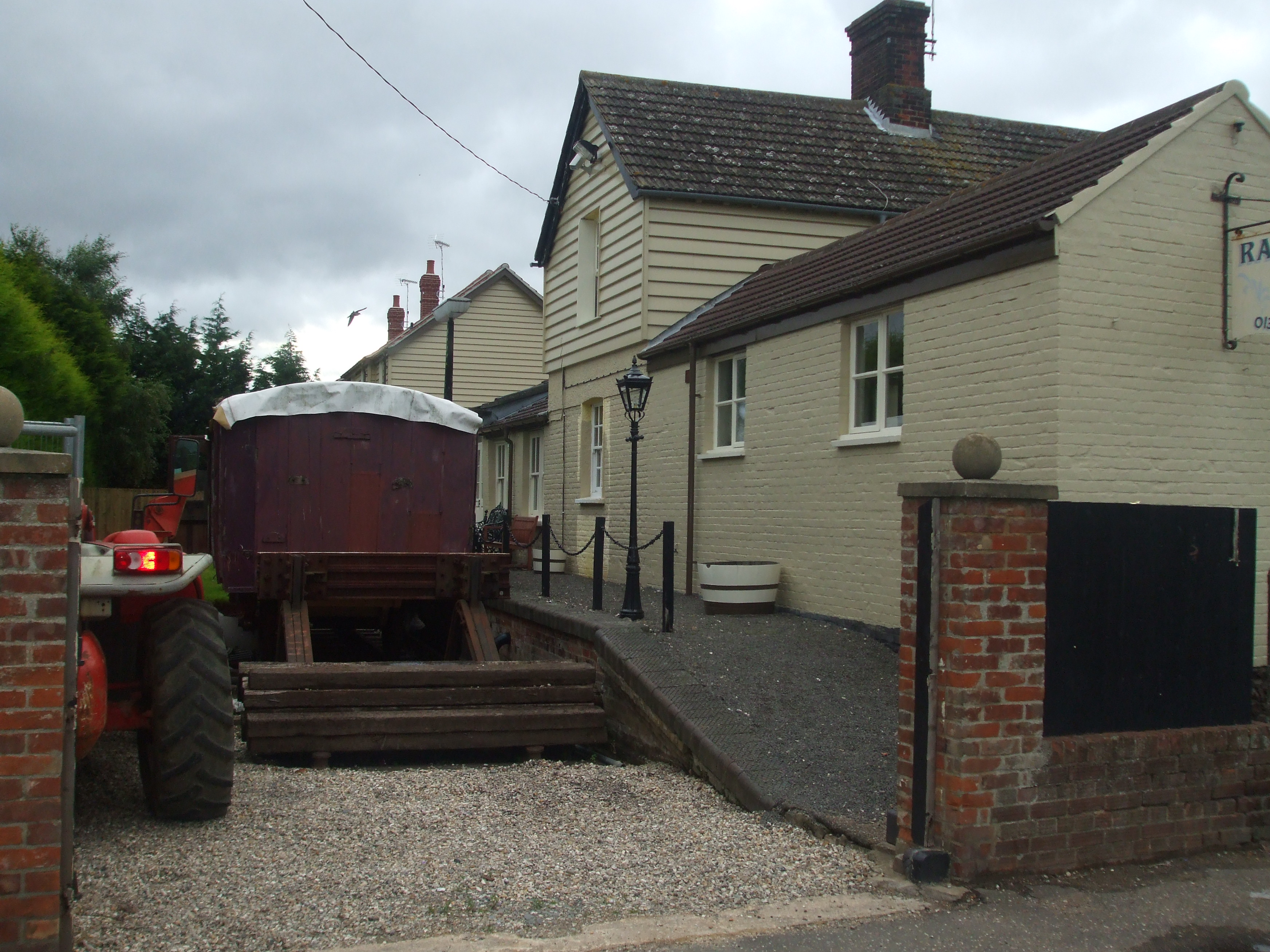
Restored platform with carriage on track in August 2008

Following closure, the station was for some time used as a garage ("Burnham Motors") with the goods shed used as a workshop; the buildings were well-looked after by the proprietor, Mr A.B. Mason. In 1996 it became a residential annexe for "The Hoste Arms" hotel, before being offered for sale for £695,000 in April 2005. When the property failed to sell, it was reported later that year that a planning application had been lodged to demolish the station buildings. The buildings were however saved and converted into a boutique hotel known as "The Railway Inn"; part of the platform has been restored and a 19th-century railway carriage placed on a reinstated section of track. The owner had hoped to use the carriage as extra accommodation but this was not possible as it would require too many original fittings to be insulated.

The goods shed survives as a private dwelling, complete with canopy. It is now located in Old Railway Walk a short cul-de-sac off Station Road.

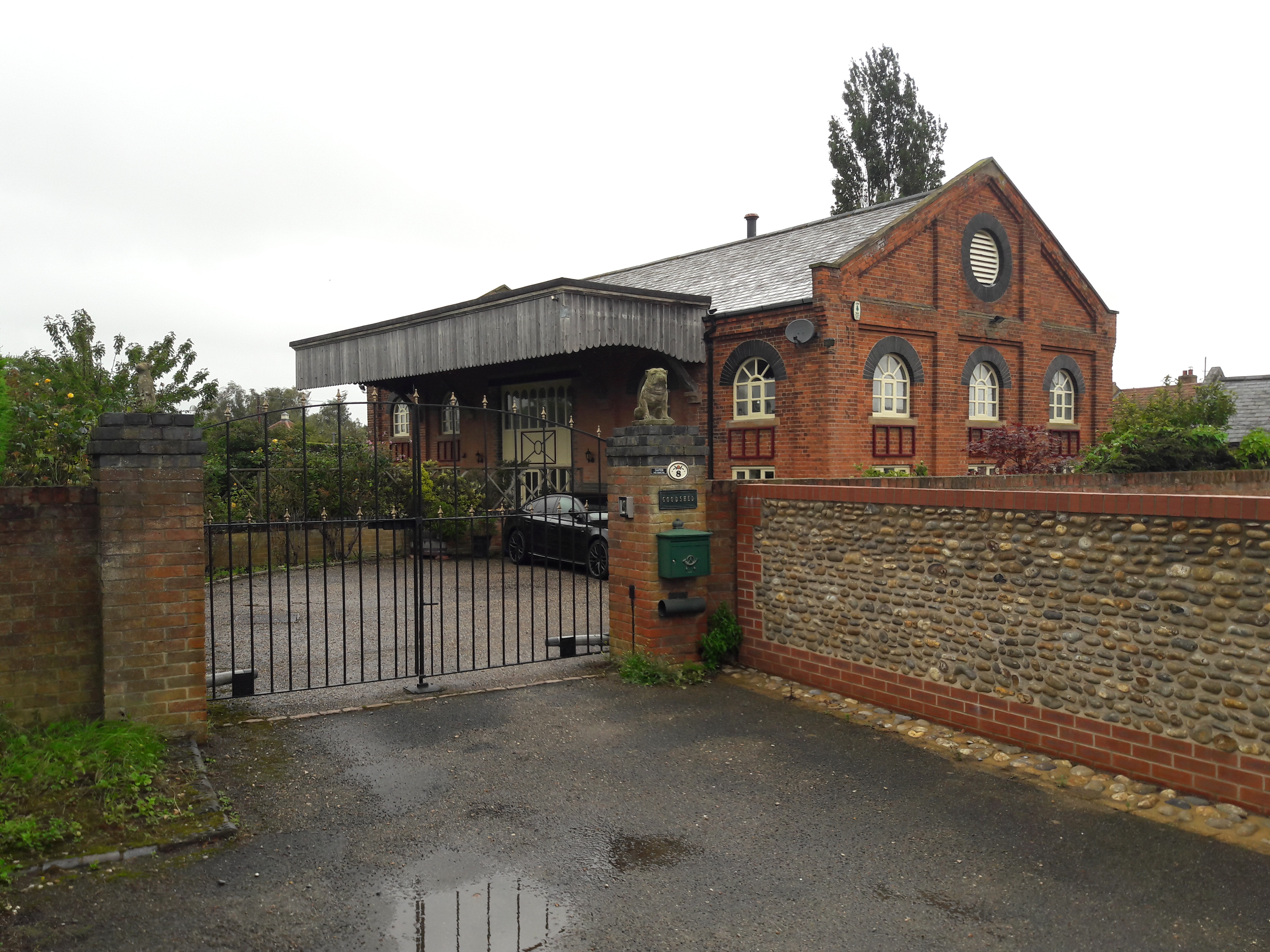
The goods shed in August 2020

== See also ==
- List of closed railway stations in Norfolk
