= Heacham railway station =

Former railway station in Norfolk, England

Coordinates: 52.9088°N 0.4804°E

Heacham
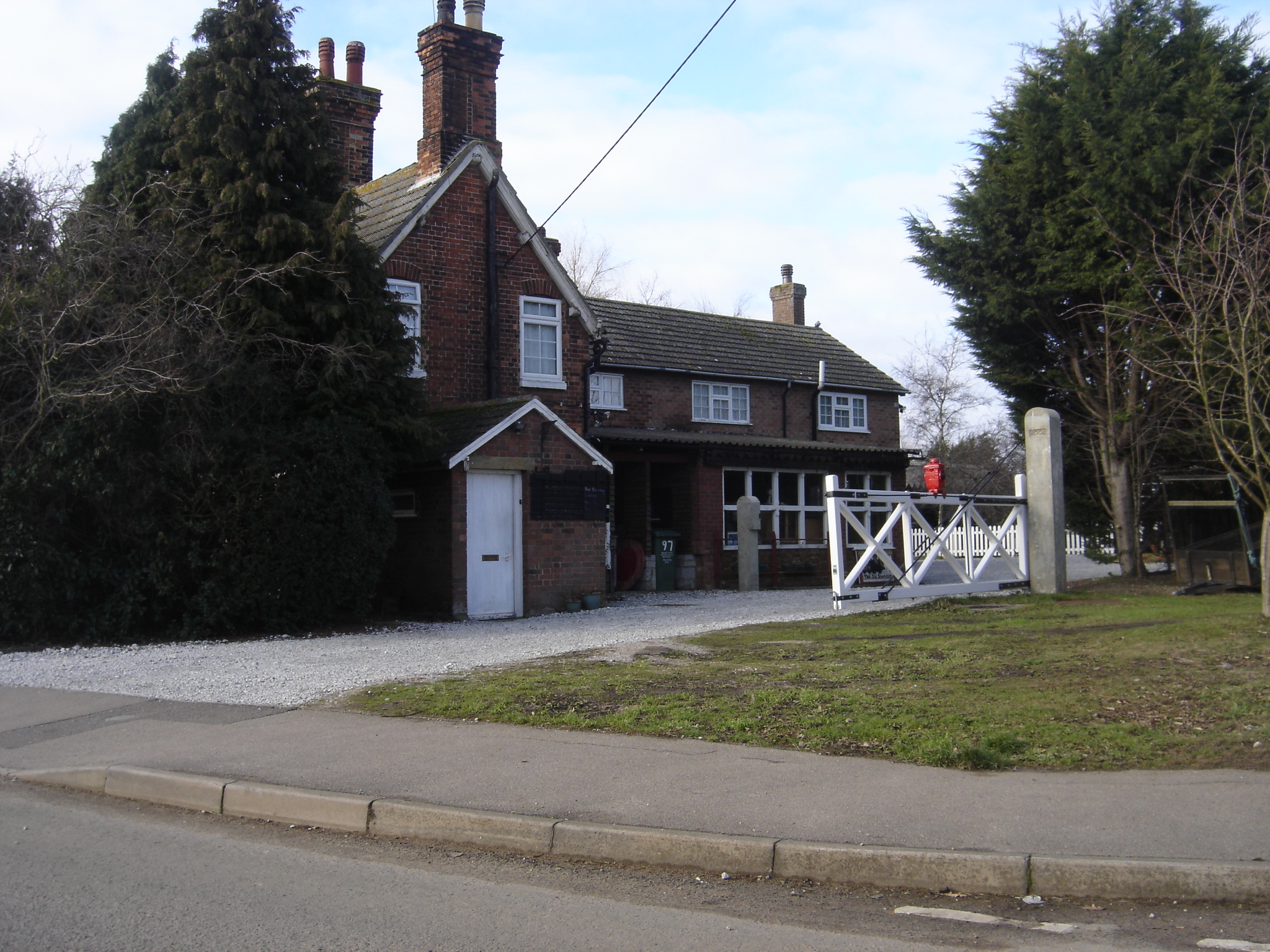
- Main station building in 2010

General information
- Location: Heacham, King's Lynn and West Norfolk; England
- Grid reference: TF668375
- Platforms: 3

Other information
- Status: Disused (holiday lets)

History
- Original company: Lynn and Hunstanton Railway
- Pre-grouping: Great Eastern Railway
- Post-grouping: London and North Eastern Railway; Eastern Region of British Railways

Key dates
- 3 October 1862: Opened
- 5 May 1969: Closed
Location

Heacham was a railway station which served the seaside resort of Heacham in Norfolk, England. Opened in 1862, the station became a junction where services left the King's Lynn to Hunstanton line for Wells on the West Norfolk Junction Railway, which opened in 1866. The station closed with the Hunstanton line in 1969.

== History ==
The station, about a mile (1.6 km) to the west of Heacham village, was intended to tap a thriving holiday market in the 19th century. A favourite resort of Queen Alexandra in the earlier 20th century, the village later attracted large numbers of caravans and chalets to its shingly foreshore. The Lynn and Hunstanton Railway proved an immediate success and encouraged the construction of a further line, the West Norfolk Junction Railway from Heacham to Wells, which opened in 1866.

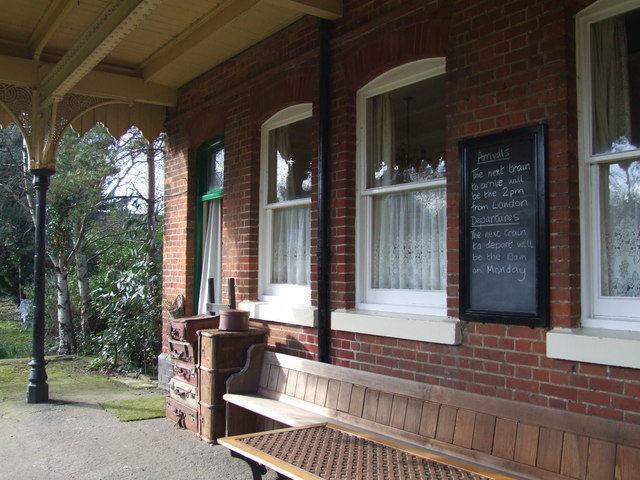
Former waiting rooms on platform 2 of the old station, now converted into holiday accommodation.

Services to Wells started and terminated at a bay platform to the east of the station, while trains to Hunstanton and King's Lynn took the two through platforms. The station was rebuilt at least twice, with the Great Eastern Railway adding platform canopies and a turntable, and improving the platform buildings. More substantial changes were made by the successor London and North Eastern Railway in 1937, as Heacham had become a significant holiday destination and the passing loop needed to accommodate 13-coach trains. The platforms were linked by a lattice girder footbridge and a signal box was placed on the down side. Arriving passengers could lodge at the nearby West Norfolk hotel. In 1960–1961, the station offered a camping coach converted from a Pullman car, fitted with a full kitchen, two sleeping compartments and a room with two single beds. A further camping coach was available in 1962–1965.

A post-war boom on the King's Lynn to Hunstanton line had no impact on the West Norfolk Junction Railway, whose inconveniently sited stations contributed to a decline in passenger traffic. Passenger services from Wells were withdrawn from 31 May 1952, but the line remained open to freight until the North Sea flood of 1953, when the track between Wells and Holkham was severely damaged. The King's Lynn to Hunstanton line survived until 1969 when it closed amid falling traffic and service cutbacks.

Preceding station	Disused railways	Following station
Snettisham; Line and station closed	British Rail; Eastern Region; King's Lynn to Hunstanton branch	Hunstanton; Line and station closed
Terminus	British Rail; Eastern Region; Heacham to Wells line	Sedgeford; Line and station closed

== Present day ==
The station buildings mostly survived and from 1993 were converted into holiday accommodation, with a camping and caravan site on the old trackbed. The owners of the site acquired a British Railways Mark 1 first class carriage from the Battlefield Line Railway in 2006, converting it into further accommodation. The old signal box survived for many years, but was removed to make way for housing.

== See also ==
- List of closed railway stations in Norfolk
