= Holkham =

Village in Norfolk, England

Coordinates: 52.9588°N 0.8159°E

- Location within Norfolk
- Area: 8.822 sq mi (22.85 km^{2})
- Population: 218 (2021 census)
  - Density: 25/sq mi (9.7/km^{2})
- OS grid reference: TF892438
- Civil parish: Holkham
- District: North Norfolk
- Shire county: Norfolk
- Region: East
- Country: England
- Sovereign state: United Kingdom
- Post town: WELLS-NEXT-THE-SEA
- Postcode district: NR23
- Dialling code: 01328
- Police: Norfolk
- Fire: Norfolk
- Ambulance: East of England
- UK Parliament: North Norfolk

Holkham is a small village and civil parish in the English county of Norfolk. The village is dominated by the stately home and estate, Holkham Hall, and a beach, Holkham Gap, at the centre of Holkham National Nature Reserve.

Holkham is located 1.8 miles (2.9 km) north-west of Wells-next-the-Sea and 31 miles (50 km) north-west of Norwich.

== Geography ==
According to the 2021 census, Holkham has a population of 218 people which shows a decrease from the 220 people recorded in the 2011 census.

The village of Holkham is located on The Coast Road between Wells-next-the-Sea and Burnham Overy Staithe. Holkham has been situated in the hundred of (North) Greenhoe since before the Conquest. At one time the village was a landing with access to the sea via a tidal creek to the harbour at Wells. The creek succumbed to land reclamation, much of which created the grounds of the estate, starting in 1639 and ending in 1859 when the harbour at Wells was edged with a sea wall. The land west of the wall was subsequently turned to agricultural uses. Aerial photographs show traces of the creek in the topsoil, and the lake to the west of the hall appears to be based on a remnant of it. Now the village serves principally as the main entrance to the hall and deer park, and to Lady Anne's Drive which leads to the beach. Among the houses of the village are several estate-owned businesses, including a hotel ('The Victoria Inn') and art gallery.

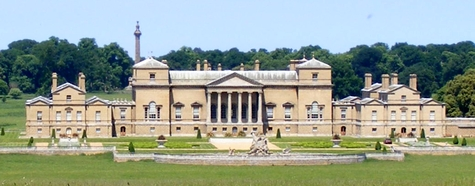
Holkham Hall

Holkham Hall is one of the principal Palladian houses of England, built for an ancestor of Thomas Coke, noted agricultural innovator and later 1st Earl of Leicester. The hall, now the home of the 8th Earl, is surrounded by an attractive park, with herds of red and fallow deer, a lake that was once a tidal creek, several monuments and drives, and its own chapel. Both hall and park are open to the public. The hall also holds a large collection of Artwork.

From the main coast road Lady Anne's Drive, a toll road owned by the Holkham Estate, crosses the reclaimed salt marshes to Holkham Gap. This is a gap in pine-fringed sand dunes which form the outer coastline. From here, an uninterrupted sandy beach runs both ways to Wells and Burnham Overy Staithe. To the west of the gap is a nudist section of beach. Holkham railway station was located about halfway along Lady Anne's Drive (to the east). The railway line through to Holkham was built in 1864. The line made up part of the Great Eastern Railway network, which ran from Wells-next-the-Sea, through Holkham and on to Burnham Market. The line was closed in 1952.

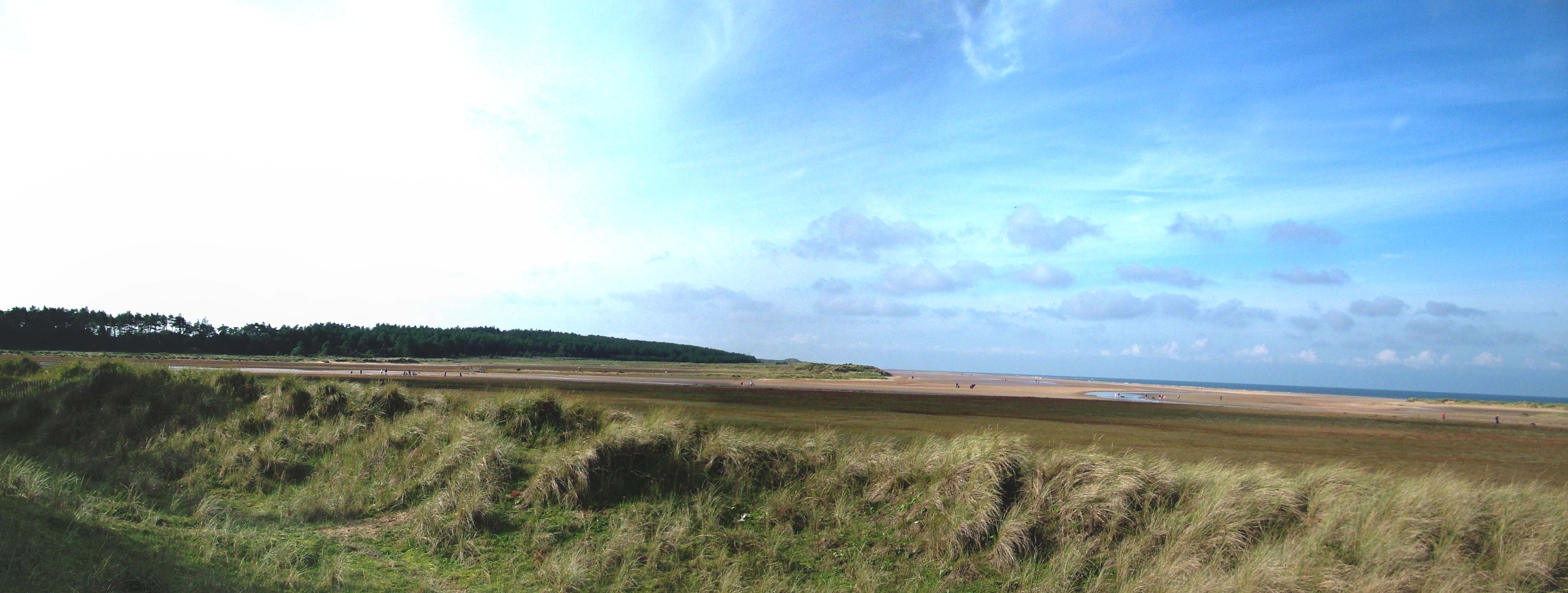
Over the dunes at Holkham

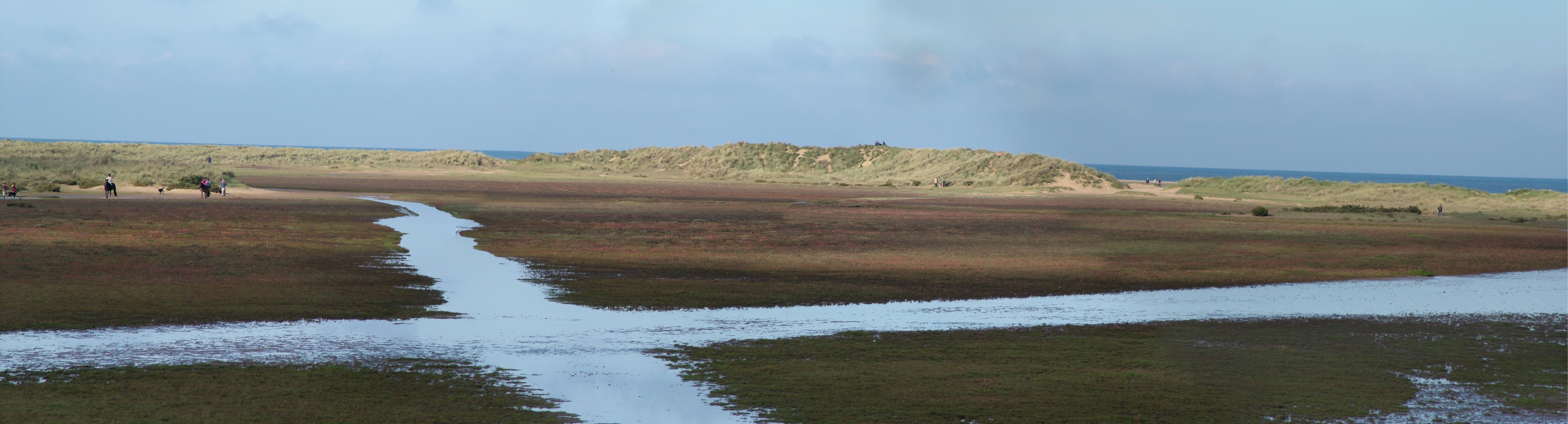
Holkham Beach in autumn

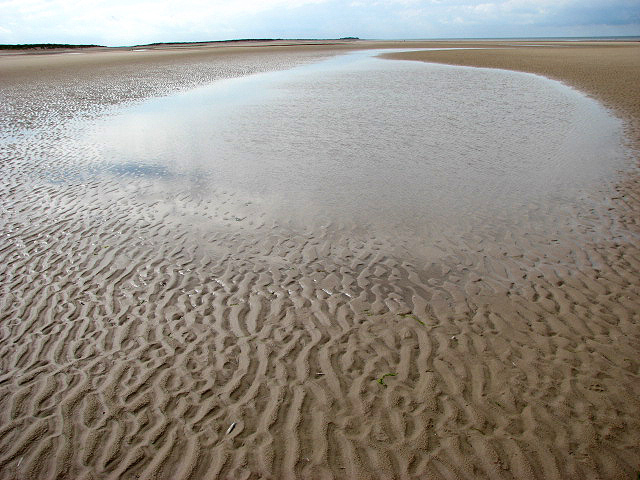
View towards Scolt Head Island Nature Reserve (seen in the far distance)

Holkham Pines is the large belt of pine trees which runs west to east inland from the beach; the eastern end is known as Wells Woods. Holkham Freshmarsh is a series of wet meadows which sit inland from the pine belt, and north of the A149. They are bisected by Lady Anne's Drive, which gives access to the woods and the beach. The marshes are important for their wintering population of pink-footed geese, and have been designated a National Nature Reserve.

== History ==
=== Celts ===
The last of the ancient Celts to inhabit East Anglia were the tribe of the Iceni. They are believed responsible for the earthworks of the Roman Iron Age visible in the marsh. A Roman road runs along the west side of the estate. Their provincial capital under Roman occupation was Venta Icenorum near Norwich.

=== Anglo-Saxons ===
The Anglo-Saxon Chronicle for the years 449–454 records the arrival of large numbers of Angles and Jutes under Hengist and Horsa, defeating the British king, Vortigern, in 455.

By about 600 the distribution of cruciform brooches, a diagnostic of Anglo-Jutish society, show that the culture had displaced the Celtic on the east coast of Britain, including coastal East Anglia. A similar displacement was true of Saxon culture in south-east Britain, diagnosed by saucer brooches. Two bands of Anglo-Saxons penetrated into East Anglia, one down the rivers that empty into the Wash and the other into the centre.

In the 7th century the Germanic kings of these regions were being converted to Christianity. The Anglisc or Englisc of East Anglia may already by that time have been divided into the "North Folk" and the "South Folk". In 654 the Christian king of East Anglia, Anna of East Anglia, was killed in battle against the last pagan king of Mercia. So great was his Christian affirmation that his four daughters renounced the world and became saints. Numerous lives of the saints relate that the youngest, Saint Withburga, was brought up at Holkham. She later founded a Benedictine nunnery at East Dereham and was eventually buried at Ely in 743. This is the first reference to Holkham.

A church on the grounds of the estate, still used for worship, commemorates the saint. The existence of the saint is attested by the Anglo-Saxon Chronicle, which for the year 798 records that the body of Wihtburga, sister of St Aethelthryth, was found to be uncorrupted at Dereham 55 years after her death.

The Chronicle and the historian, Bede, do not state the name of Holkham. It does appear as that in the Domesday Book, 1086, which means that it must precede Middle English. The element -ham is clearly identifiable as Old English, "village, manor, home". The Holk- remains unidentified. A suggestion has been made that it comes from *hoelig, "holy", in honour of the saint, but it would not have been named that before she was one. The guidebook of the parish church (which is dedicated to Saint Withburga) says the area was originally called 'Wihtburgstowe' but later 'holc-ham' which the church guide translates as 'homestead in a hollow'.

=== Later Middle Ages ===
Medieval manuscripts concerning Holkham have been edited by William Hassall and Jacques Beauroy.

=== 20th century ===
Holkham Studio Pottery was set up at Holkham Hall in 1951, making it the first stately home to produce pottery on-site to sell in the gift shop. At its peak, it employed 100 people and sold its distinctive pottery around the world. The company, which produced earthenwares, became Holkham Pottery Ltd in 1961 and closed in 2007.

== Church of St Withburga ==
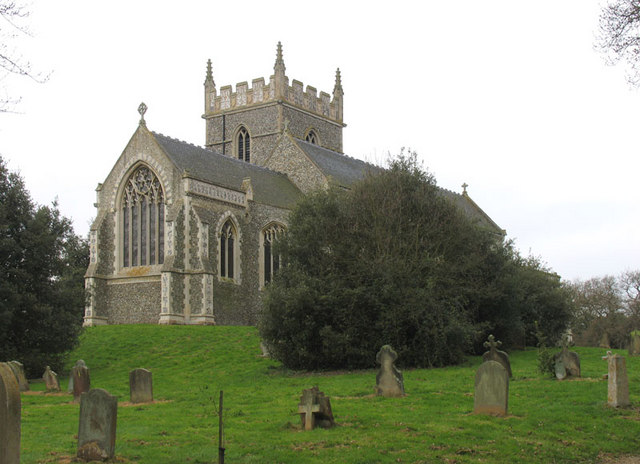
The parish church of St Withburga, Holkham

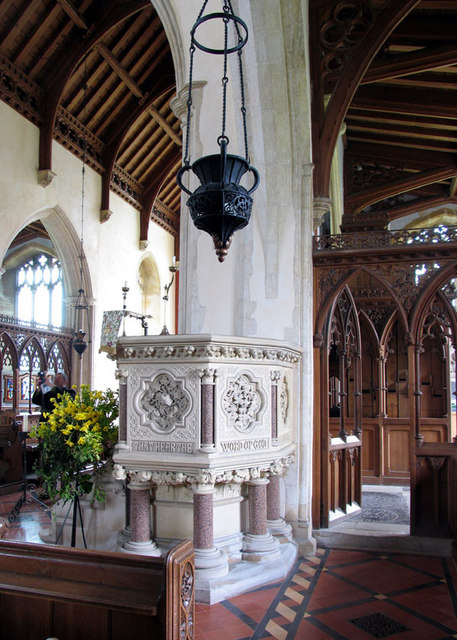
St Withburga's, Holkham – interior

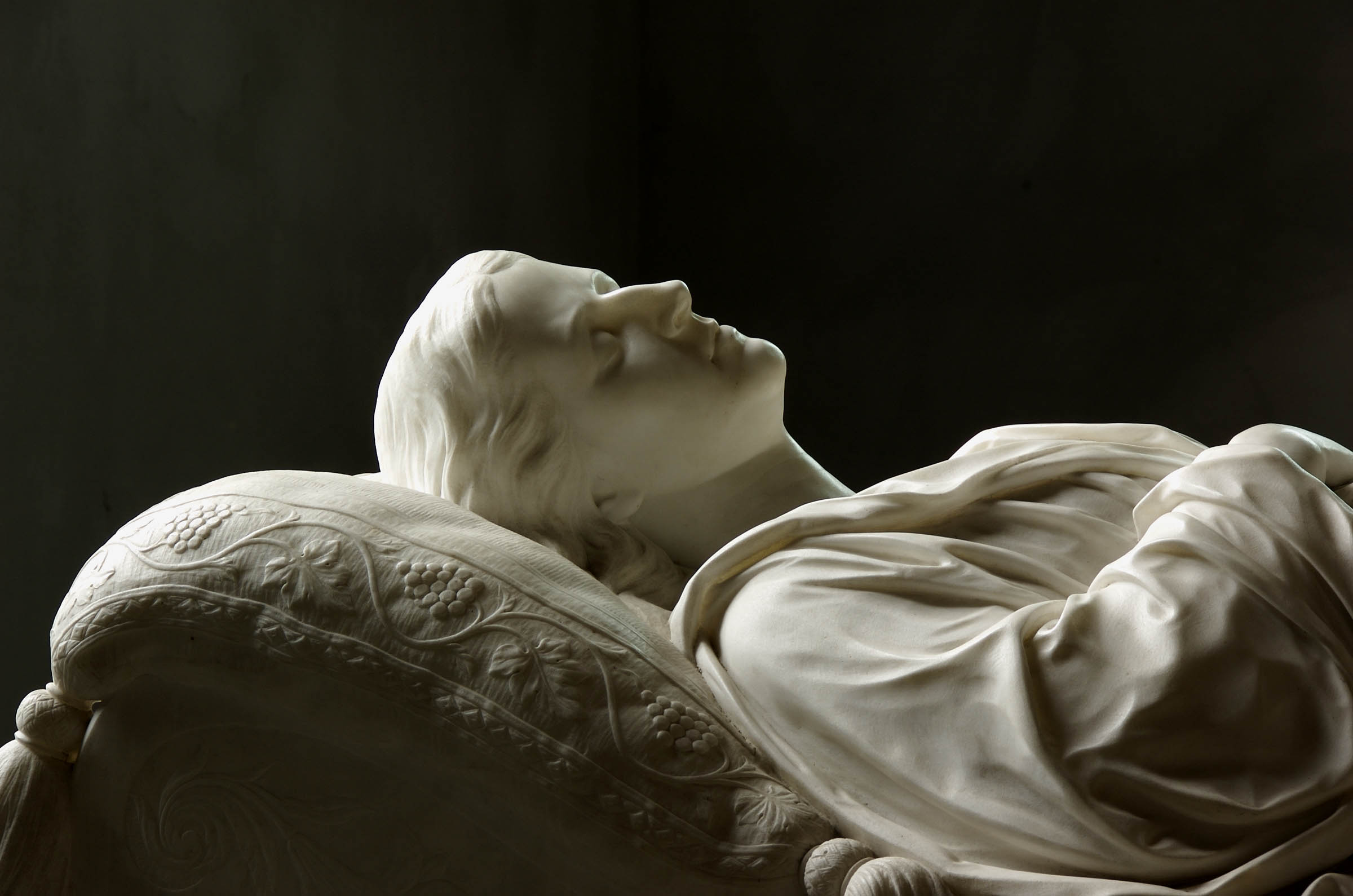
Sculpted memorial to Juliana, wife of the 2nd Earl of Leicester (detail)

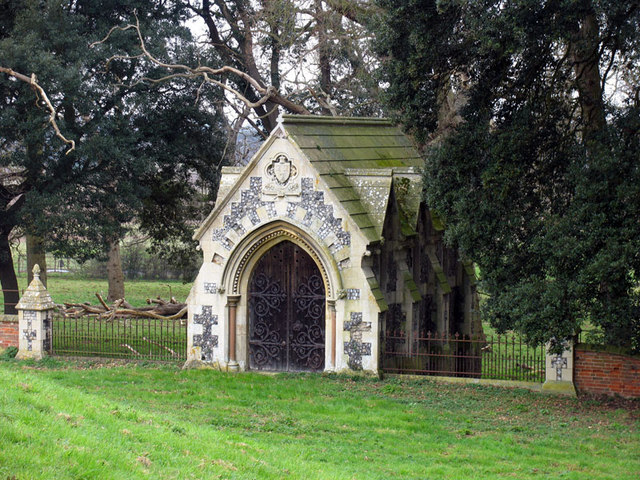
The Coke Mausoleum, empty since 1905

Holkham parish church is just south of the coast road, hidden in the trees of the Holkham Estate. It stands on a tall circular mound, which archaeologists suggest might be man-made and possibly pre-Anglo-Saxon.

Holkham parish church is dedicated to Saint Withburga. This dedication to an Anglo-Saxon saint often implies a church has Anglo-Saxon origins. Excavations at Holkham have found Anglo-Saxon remains near the west end which may be a tower. Norman remains have been found incorporated into the present building which implies that the Normans expanded the Anglo-Saxon building – as they did at other churches. In turn this Norman church made way for an Early English building (13th century). The tower and the western part of the south aisle date from this period. The church guidebook notes that the tower gets progressively younger as it goes up. The lower section is Early English up to the sill of the belfry windows. The belfry itself is Decorated (14th century) while the battlements and pinnacles are Perpendicular (15th to 16th century). During restoration work at least six 12th- and 13th-century coffin lids with foliated crosses were found on site and are now on show inside the church.

The north aisle and north transept are thought to have been added later than the 13th century as burials and parts of coffin lids were found under the foundations. The church is known to have been enlarged in the 14th century and many of the internal arches are Decorated period. By the early 18th century the church had fallen into decay but the development of Holkham Estate by the Coke family led to renewed interest in the church. In 1767 the Countess Dowager of Leicester put up £1,000 for its repair. She had overseen the completion of Holkham Hall after the death of the 1st Earl in 1759.

A major renovation of the church was completed in 1869 at the expense of Juliana, the wife of the 2nd Earl of Leicester. This cost £9,000. She died the following year and has a striking sculpted memorial in the north chapel of the church. The unusual mausoleum in the west wall of the churchyard was built for Juliana in the 1870s, but her body was transferred in 1905 to the Coke family plot on the south side of the churchyard.

Inside the parish church there are several other memorials to various members of the Coke family of Holkham Hall. During the post medieval period, many Cokes were also buried in St Mary's Church, Tittleshall.

== Media ==
- All the Peenemünde sequences of the 1965 film Operation Crossbow featuring German attempts to make the V-1 fly were filmed at Holkham Gap. The mass grave sequence at Holkham was filmed using male extras recruited from nearby Wells-next-the-Sea and – as a result – the film used to show at the former Wells cinema for several weeks a year during the late 1960s.
- Several parts of the 1976 film The Eagle Has Landed, starring Michael Caine, Donald Sutherland and Robert Duvall, were filmed on Holkham Beach and in the pinewoods.
- The final scenes of Shakespeare in Love (1998) were filmed on the beach.
- The music video for "Pure Shores", by All Saints, for the 2000 film The Beach, was filmed here.
- A number of beach scenes for the Avengers episode "The Town of No Return" (1965) were filmed at Holkham Gap.
- Parts of the ITV1 drama Kingdom, featuring comedian Stephen Fry, were filmed on Wells and Holkham Beaches.
- The Duchess starring Keira Knightley was filmed at Holkham Hall.
- Scenes of Annihilation starring Natalie Portman were filmed at Holkham Pines in July 2016.

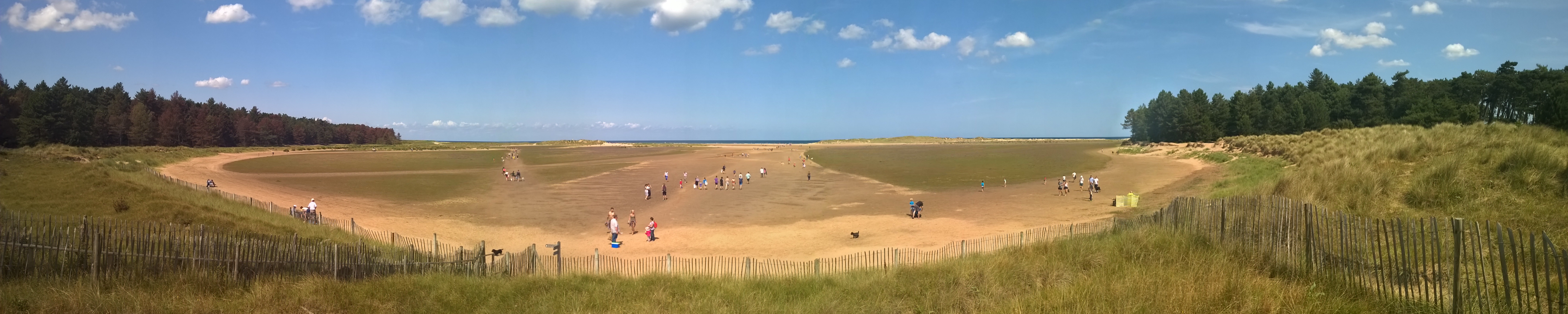
The beach entrance from the pinewoods

== Notable residents ==
- Robert Coke MP (1651–1679), politician, born in Holkham Hall.
- Thomas Coke KB, 1st Earl of Leicester (1697–1759), landowner, lived in Holkham Hall.
- Thomas Coke MP, 1st Earl of Leicester (1754–1842), politician and agricultural reformer, born in Holkham Hall.
- William Shellabear (1862–1947), scholar and missionary, born in Holkham.
- Alice Coke DBE JP, Countess of Leicester (1866–1936), Anglo-Irish aristocrat, lived in Holkham Hall.
- Thomas Coke, 5th Earl of Leicester (1908–1976), peer of the realm, lived in Holkham Hall.
- Anne Tennant LVO, Baroness Glenconner (b.1932), peeress and socialite, born in Holkham Hall.
- Edward Coke, 7th Earl of Leicester (1936–2015), nobleman, lived in Holkham Hall.
- Thomas Coke, 8th Earl of Leicester (b.1965), nobleman, Lord of Holkham Hall.
- Alan Miller (1970–2021), West Brom and Middlesbrough footballer, died in Holkham.

== Governance ==
Hindringham is part of the electoral ward of Wells with Holkham for local elections and is part of the district of North Norfolk.

The village's national constituency is North Norfolk, which has been represented by the Liberal Democrat Steff Aquarone MP since 2024.

== See also ==
- List of closed railway stations in Britain: H–J

== War memorials ==
Holkham has two memorials: a marble plaque in St Withburga's Church and a granite obelisk in the grounds of Holkham Hall. The latter memorial was unveiled in 1920 by Thomas Coke, 3rd Earl of Leicester, Alice Coke, Countess of Leicester and John Bowers, Bishop of Thetford. Together, the memorials list the following names for the First World War:

Rank	Name	Unit	Date of death	Burial/Commemoration
Lt.	Arthur G. Coke	RNAS Armoured Car Division	21 May 1915	Helles Memorial
Sjt.	Thomas J. Groom	61st Bn., Machine Gun Corps	21 Mar. 1918	Pozières Memorial
Cpl.	Ernest Reeve	2nd Bn., Essex Regiment	3 May 1917	Arras Memorial
Cpl.	Richard W. Sizeland	5th Bn., Gloucester Regiment	30 Sep. 1918	Rue-du-Bois Cemetery
Pte.	Edward Futter	7th Bn., Bedfordshire Regiment	23 Mar. 1918	Pozières Memorial
Pte.	George Curl	7th Bn., The Buffs	13 Oct. 1917	Tyne Cot
Pte.	Frederick G. Swain	2nd Bn., Royal Dublin Fusiliers	4 Nov. 1918	Fontaine-au-Bois Cem.
Pte.	William E. Neale	4th Bn., Norfolk Regiment	19 Apr. 1917	Gaza War Cemetery
Pte.	Albert E. Sissen	4th Bn., Norfolk Regt.	1 Oct. 1915	Pietà Military Cemetery
Pte.	Christmas R. Bell	6th Bn., Norfolk Regt.	3 Jul. 1917	St Withburga's Churchyard
Pte.	Frederick E. P. Dawson	9th Bn., Norfolk Regt.	15 Sep. 1916	Thiepval Memorial
Pte.	Sydney T. Dennis	1st Bn., Northamptonshire Regt.	10 Jul. 1917	Nieuport Memorial
Pte.	George W. Dunthorpe	5th Bn., Ox & Bucks Light Infantry	25 Sep. 1915	Menin Gate
Pte.	Robert Mallett	1st Bn., Scots Guards	12 Oct. 1917	Bleuet Farm Cemetery
Pte.	Herbert J. Balls	1st Bn., South Staffordshire Regt.	9 Aug. 1918	Boscon British Cemetery
Pte.	William J. Dunn	11th Bn., Suffolk Regiment	26 Aug. 1917	Hargicourt Cemetery
Rfn.	Alfred C. Groom	2nd Bn., King's Royal Rifle Corps	4 Nov. 1918	Vis-en-Artois Memorial
Spr.	Sydney W. Bell-Brown	2nd (Field) Coy., Royal Engineers	26 Nov. 1916	Allonville Cemetery
ShSth	Edward V. Dennis	Horse Supply, Army Service Corp	2 Sep. 1918	Saint-Marie Cemetery

The following names were added after the Second World War:

Rank	Name	Unit	Date of death	Burial/Commemoration
FLt.	David A. Coke	No. 80 Squadron RAF (Hurricanes)	9 Dec. 1941	Knightsbridge War Cemetery
FSgt.	Jack R. Dickerson	Royal Air Force	17 Mar. 1942	Runnymede Memorial

== Bibliography ==
- Falkus, Malcolm; Gillingham, John (1987). Historical Atlas of Britain. Crescent Books. ISBN 0-517-63382-5.
- Stirling, Anna Maria Diana Wilhelmina Pickering (1908). Coke of Norfolk and his Friends. London, New York: John Lane, the Bodley Head. Available Google Books.
