= Snettisham railway station =

Railway station in North Norfolk, England

Coordinates: 52.8721°N 0.4899°E

Snettisham
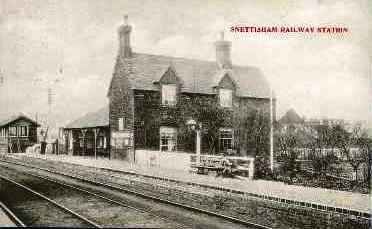

General information
- Location: Snettisham, King's Lynn and West Norfolk, Norfolk; England
- Grid reference: TF677334
- Platforms: 2

Other information
- Status: Disused

History
- Original company: Lynn and Hunstanton Railway
- Pre-grouping: Great Eastern Railway
- Post-grouping: London and North Eastern Railway; Eastern Region of British Railways

Key dates
- 3 October 1862: Opened
- 5 May 1969: Closed
Location

Snettisham was a railway station on the King's Lynn to Hunstanton line which served the village of Snettisham, a few miles north of King's Lynn in North Norfolk, England. Opened in 1862, the station closed along with the line in 1969.

== History ==
Although essentially a minor passing place on the King's Lynn to Hunstanton line, when the proposal for a railway line between King's Lynn and Hunstanton had been first mooted, the possibility of building a new harbour at Snettisham had been discussed. This, it was said, would provide a safe haven for trading and fishing vessels on the eastern side of The Wash, enabling the local mussels to be brought in there rather than King's Lynn or Boston. However, the coming of the railway actually put paid to these ideas by eroding the local coasting trade which was hit by severe gales in the 1870s.

Snettisham station was equipped with up and down platforms and its platform buildings were constructed out of the local carrstone. Four sidings diverged from the main line to the north of the main station, serving respectively a small goods yard, a goods shed, the local coal merchants and Messrs Vynne & Everitt's granary. Goods traffic consisted of mainly coal and agricultural produce such as grain, bagged manure and vegetables. On the up side of the line was an 18-lever standard Great Eastern signal box. Snettisham was initially considered important enough to boast its own stationmaster, but this post was later abolished leaving the station with a staff of 4/5; in the station's later years one of the signalmen, Gerry Kendall, created a topiary on the up platform which marked out the station's name.

The station was host to a LNER camping coach from 1935 to 1939.

In 1962 the future poet laureate John Betjeman visited Snettisham station as part of a 10-minute documentary film detailing the journey from King's Lynn to Hunstanton. The film was a collaboration between BBC East Anglia and British Transport Films.

Preceding station	Disused railways	Following station
Dersingham; Line and station closed	British Rail; Eastern Region; King's Lynn to Hunstanton branch	Heacham; Line and station closed

== Present day ==
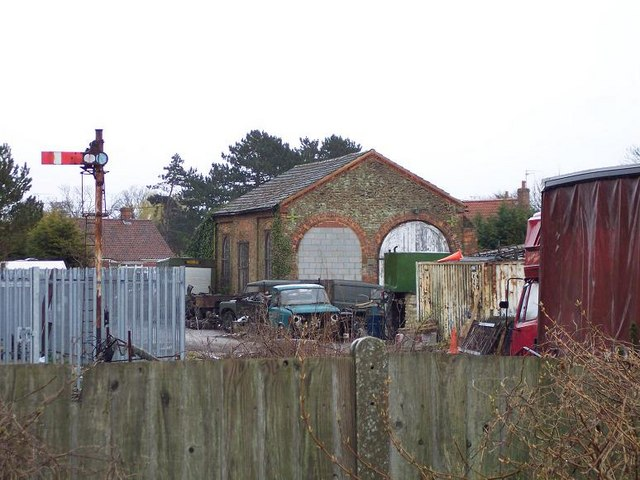
Engine shed in 2006.

Following closure in 1969, the main station building (which was to the south of Poppyfields Drive, off Station Road, to the east of the A149) became a private residence, while the adjacent engine shed and granary are used by a furniture dealer. In the garden of nearby "Granary Cottage" stands the buffer stop which was originally at the end of Vynne & Everitt's siding. In 2004, the signal box was moved to Hardingham on the Mid-Norfolk Railway.

== See also ==
- Railways in Norfolk
- King's Lynn to Hunstanton line
