= Docking railway station =

Former railway station in Norfolk, England

Coordinates: 52.90831°N 0.62501°E

Docking
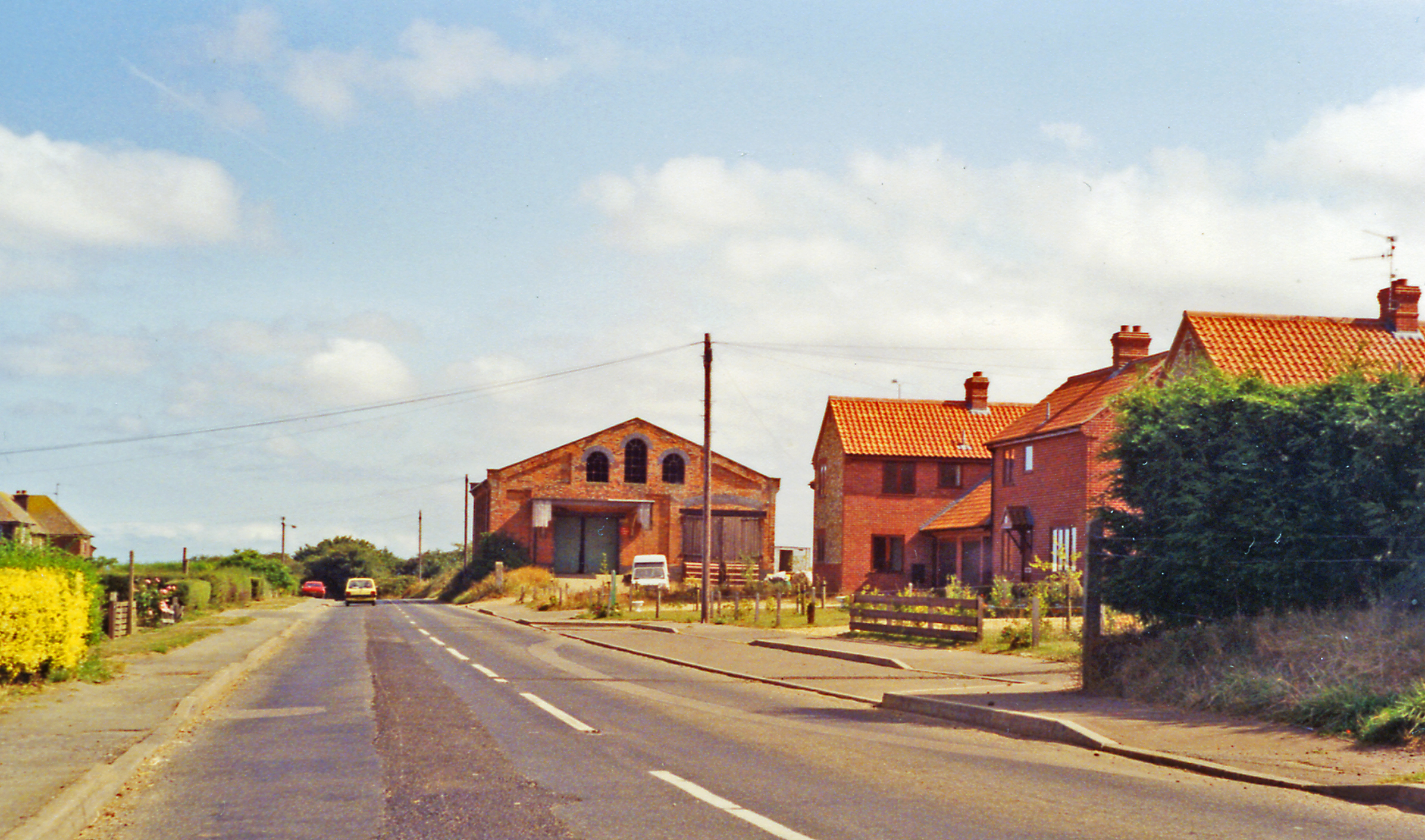
- Docking station (remains)

General information
- Location: Docking, Norfolk; England
- Grid reference: TF766377
- Platforms: 2

Other information
- Status: Disused

History
- Original company: West Norfolk Junction Railway
- Pre-grouping: Great Eastern Railway
- Post-grouping: London and North Eastern Railway; Eastern Region of British Railways

Key dates
- 17 August 1866: Opened
- 02 June 1952: Closed to passengers
- 28 December 1964: Closed to goods
Location

Docking railway station was a station in Norfolk, serving the village of Docking. It closed to passengers in 1952.

Preceding station	Disused railways	Following station
Sedgeford; Line and station closed	Great Eastern	Stanhoe; Line and station closed
