= John Betjeman Goes by Train =

1962 British film by Malcolm Freegard

John Betjeman Goes By Train
- John Betjeman boards the train for his trip to Hunstanton
- Starring: John Betjeman
- Production companies: British Transport Films; BBC East
- Release date: 1962
- Running time: 10 minutes
- Country: United Kingdom

John Betjeman Goes By Train is a 1962 short documentary film directed by Malcolm Freegard and made by British Transport Films and BBC East Anglia. The 10-minute-long film features future poet laureate John Betjeman as he takes a memorable journey by train from King's Lynn railway station to Hunstanton railway station in Norfolk, pointing out various sights and stopping off at Wolferton station on the Sandringham Estate and Snettisham station, where he extols the virtues of rural branchline stations. An early example of a Betjeman travelogue film, a similar idea was later used for his 1973 documentary Metro-land.
