= Stanhoe =

Village in Norfolk, England

Coordinates: 52.89943°N 0.67319°E

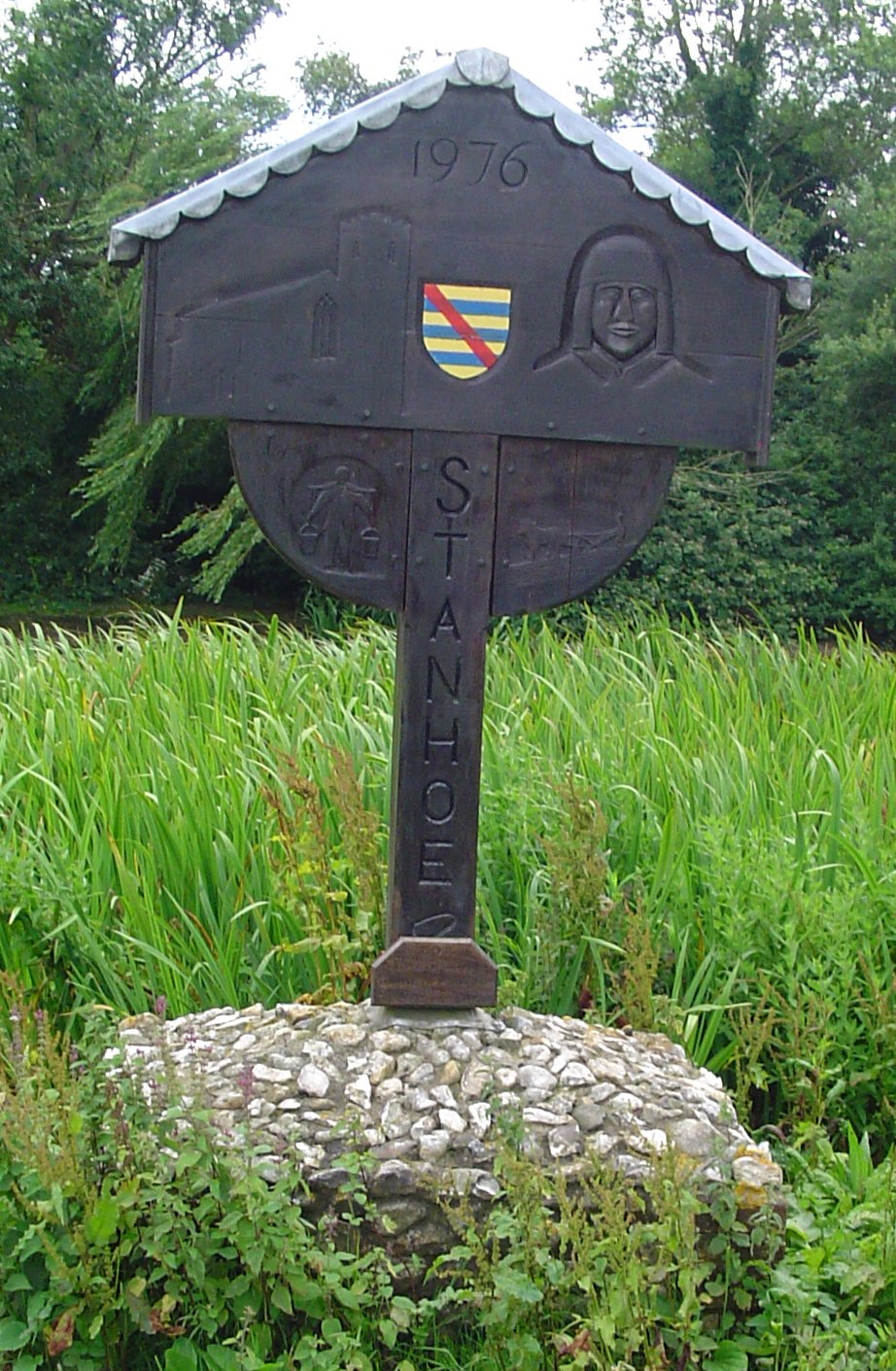
- Signpost in Stanhoe

- Location within Norfolk
- Area: 6.06 km^{2} (2.34 sq mi)
- Population: 289 (2011)
  - Density: 48/km^{2} (120/sq mi)
- OS grid reference: TF799369
- Civil parish: Stanhoe
- District: King's Lynn and West Norfolk
- Shire county: Norfolk
- Region: East
- Country: England
- Sovereign state: United Kingdom
- Post town: KING'S LYNN
- Postcode district: PE31
- Dialling code: 01485
- Police: Norfolk
- Fire: Norfolk
- Ambulance: East of England

Stanhoe is a village and civil parish in the English county of Norfolk, 6.4 miles (10.2 km) from the North Sea. It covers an area of 6.06 km^{2} (2.34 sq mi) and had a population of 196 in 97 households at the 2001 census. The population including Bagthorpe with Barmer at the 2011 Census had increased to 289. For the purposes of local government, it falls within the district of King's Lynn and West Norfolk.

The village's name is perhaps from the Old English for "stony hill-spur".

For a period during the 19th century, its parish priest was Philip Ward, husband of Lord Nelson's daughter Horatia.

The nearest large village is Docking. Also near Stanhoe are to be found remains of Creake Abbey, near the village of North Creake.

Stanhoe was once served by Stanhoe railway station.
