= West Norfolk Junction Railway =

Former railway line in Norfolk, England

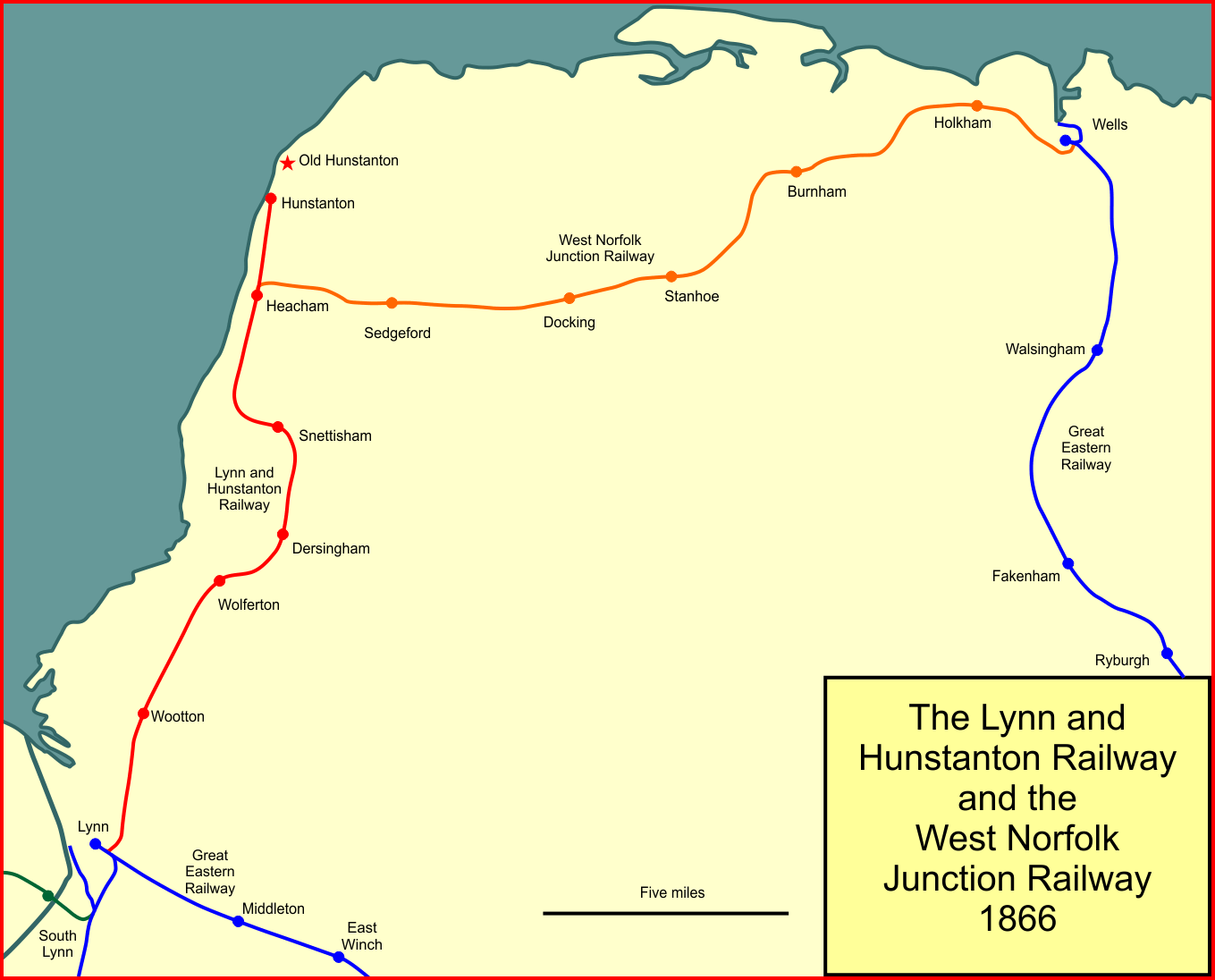
- The Lynn and Hunstanton Railway and the West Norfolk Junction Railway in 1866

Overview
- Headquarters: Wells-next-the-Sea
- Locale: England
- Dates of operation: 1866–1952 (passengers), –1953 (goods)
- Successor: Great Eastern Railway

Technical
- Track gauge: 1,435 mm (4 ft 8 1/2 in)
- Length: 18 1/2 miles (29.8 km)

The West Norfolk Junction Railway was a standard gauge eighteen and a half-mile single-track railway running between Wells-next-the-Sea railway station and Heacham in the English county of Norfolk. It opened in 1866 and closed in 1953. At Wells the line made a junction with the Wells and Fakenham Railway and at Heacham it connected with the Lynn and Hunstanton Railway from Hunstanton to Kings Lynn.

== History ==
West Norfolk Junction Railway Act 1864
- Act of Parliament
- Parliament of the United Kingdom
- Long title: An Act for making a Railway from the Lynn and Hunstanton Railway at Heacham to the Great Eastern Railway at Wells, to be called "The West Norfolk Junction Railway," all in the County of Norfolk.
- Citation: 27 & 28 Vict. c. xc

Dates
- Royal assent: 23 June 1864

Text of statute as originally enacted

The West Norfolk Junction Railway was authorised by the West Norfolk Junction Railway Act 1864 (27 & 28 Vict. c. xc) and opened in August 1866. The line came from Heacham on an 18 1/2 miles (29.8 km) single track aimed at exploiting the great arc of coastline between Hunstanton and Yarmouth. 1866 saw the start of a major financial crisis triggered by the collapse of Overend Gurney Bank; the year also saw the outbreak of a "cattle plague" in North Norfolk which impacted on the cattle receipts on the line. The West Norfolk was amalgamated with the Lynn and Hunstanton Railway in 1872, forming the Hunstanton and West Norfolk Railway, which in turn was acquired by the Great Eastern Railway under the Great Eastern, Hunstanton and West Norfolk Railway Companies Act 1890 (53 & 54 Vict. c. xiii).

The Railway, which will be wholly situate in the County of Norfolk, will commence by a Junction with the Lynn and Hunstanton Railway at the Heacham Station of that Railway, and terminate in the Parish of Wells-next-the-Sea by Two Junctions with the Wells and Fakenham Line of the Great Eastern Railway. — Section 23, West Norfolk Junction Railway Act 1864 (27 & 28 Vict. c. xc)

During the Second World War, the railway's strategic coastal location meant that it provided a natural 'rampart' behind which a potential beach invasion could be repelled. For this reason, a line of pillboxes were constructed along the railway.

The post-war boom experienced by the King's Lynn to Hunstanton line was not felt on the West Norfolk Junction Railway whose inconveniently sited stations contributed to declining passenger traffic. Passenger services from Wells-next-the-Sea to Heacham were eventually withdrawn from 2 June 1952, but the line remained open to freight. However, following the North Sea flood of 1953, the track between Wells-next-the-Sea and Holkham was so severely damaged that British Railways considered it not worth repairing and the line was closed completely between these two places.

Up to the end of its existence, the line was one of the last where one could travel in gas-lit clerestory coaches hauled by Victorian locomotives.

== Route ==
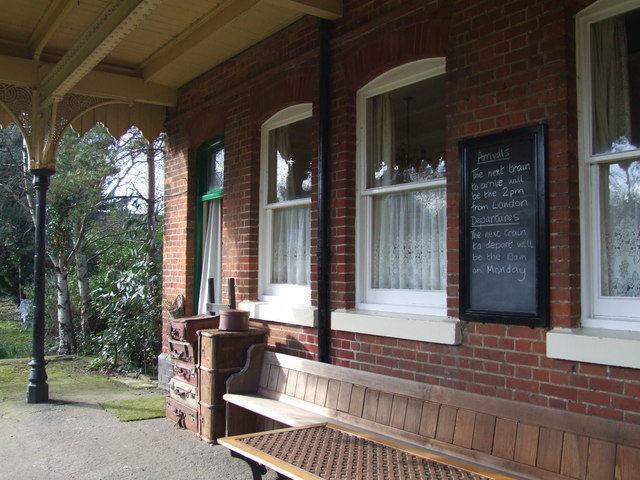
Heacham station, now holiday accommodation

At Heacham, services to Wells-next-the-Sea started and terminated in a bay platform to the east of the line, while trains to Hunstanton and King's Lynn departed from the platforms just to the west. The station was rebuilt at least twice, with the Great Eastern Railway adding platform canopies, a turntable and improving the platform buildings. More substantial modifications were carried out by the London and North Eastern Railway in 1937 as Heacham had by then become a significant holiday destination, and it was necessary to extend the passing loop to accommodate 13-coach trains. A lattice girder footbridge linked the platforms, while a signal box was situated on the down side.

Sedgeford railway station was the first station after Heacham on the single-track West Norfolk Junction Railway. It was a small station located in a rural area, equipped with a single platform on the down side, built to smaller dimensions to other stations on the Lynn and Hunstanton Railway, and without a stationmaster's residence. Very basic goods facilities were provided in the shape of a single carriage siding on the down side. The station's staff amounted to two persons, reduced to one in the final years. Traffic on the line was largely agricultural, consisting of corn, sugar beet, cattle and agricultural machinery. A level crossing lay to the east of the platform.

After passing through Docking, trains arrived at Stanhoe railway station, situated more than a mile from the village from which it took its name; its remote rural location was accentuated by the fact that it lay at a height of around 200 ft above sea level. With no goods facilities provided, the station had one of the simplest layouts on the line; a single platform on the up side on which was built a signal box and single storey station building out of Norfolk flint rather than the usual Great Eastern Carstone. A level crossing lay to the west while the line climbed to the west, running parallel with a minor road before crossing it on a level about a mile from Docking.

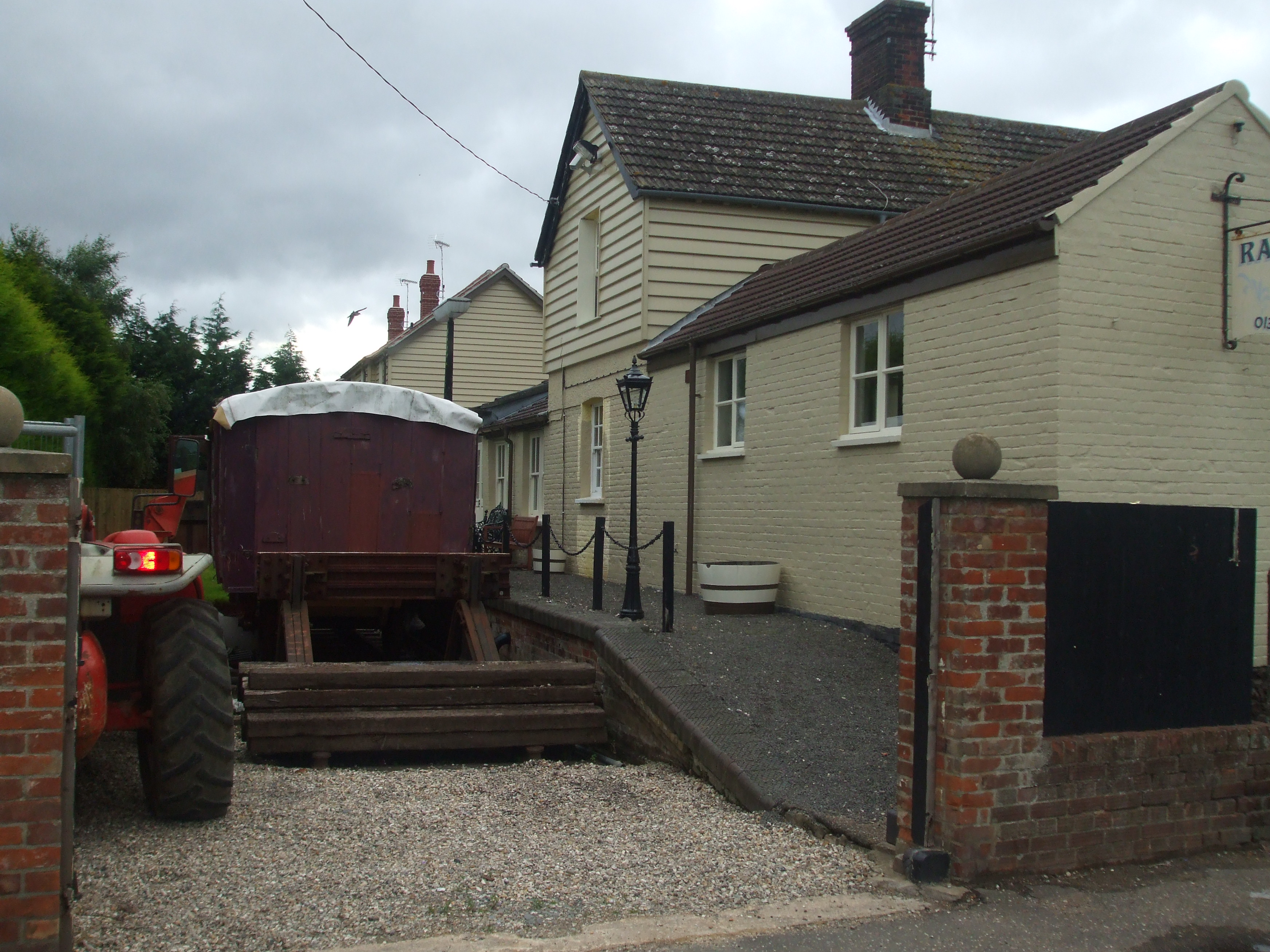
Burnham Market station, now a hotel, with carriage on track

Burnham Market was the principal intermediate station on the West Norfolk branch, serving the largest settlement between Heacham and Wells-next-the-Sea. Its importance was to decline towards the end of the nineteenth century as it shed its urban functions to become the village it is today. A single platform was provided together with a brick station building situated on the north side of the line. There was a crossing loop to the west of the station allowing it to be a passing place. Four sidings led from the loop to serve a goods yard equipped with a red brick goods shed. Another siding led to a nearby brickworks which used the railway to import coal. The station, like many others along the line, also handled its fair share of agricultural traffic and, in addition, some fish traffic (notably shellfish) from nearby villages such as Brancaster and Burnham Overy.

The station was also the nearest to Lord Nelson's birthplace at Burnham Thorpe, a fact capitalised on by the Great Eastern Railway which erected large nameboards proclaiming that this was the station "For Burnham Thorpe & Nelson's Birthplace".

At Holkham the railway line curved away from the main village centre dominated by Holkham Hall, and followed a path nearer the coast. The line had been opposed by the occupant of Holkham Hall, the Earl of Leicester, who feared that it would lead to large scale resort development and an influx of holiday visitors near his home. A station was nevertheless opened opposite the main gates of Holkham Park which had been laid out by Thomas Coke who had reclaimed from the sea some of the land over which the railway now ran. The station's approach road, Lady Ann's Drive, continued for around half a mile to the beach at Holkham Gap. The station itself was very small, equipped with a single platform and no goods facilities. Architecturally, it was a miniature version of the Great Eastern's "Victorian House" design, incorporating a small platform canopy. There was a level crossing over Lady Ann's Road which was controlled by a wooden signal box.

East of Holkham, the line curved southwards and rose on an embankment to cross the coast road on an overbridge, then turned eastwards to curve around the south of the town in a cutting which is now densely overgrown. The line entered Wells-next-the-Sea station on a sharp curve, turning through a full 180 degrees before converging with the Wymondham to Wells branch from Dereham for the final approach. West Norfolk services used the outer face of a sheltered wooden island platform to the south of the station, with the inner face being set aside for services to Dereham and Wymondham. The Dereham side was unusual in that there was a platform on either side of the train, allowing the passengers the choice of which side to alight from, much the same as Ventnor and Ulverston stations.

== Post-closure ==
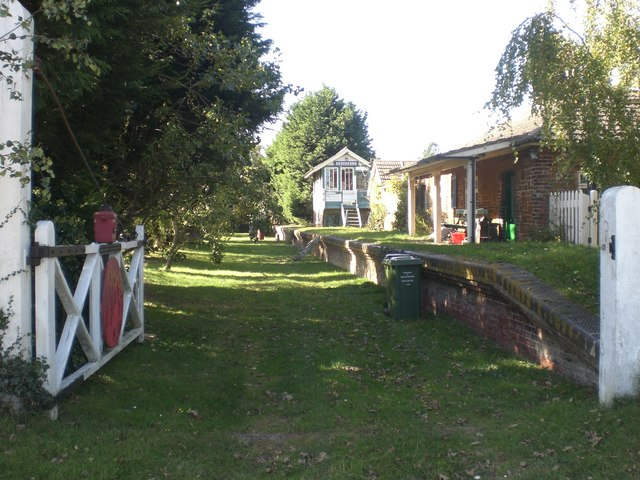
Sedgeford station, July 2008

The majority of the route remains unobstructed although some of it now traverses open fields with no visible sign of the trackbed, and at Wells-next-the-Sea the line is densely overgrown where it runs through a cutting. The stations at Heacham, Sedgeford, Stanhoe, Burnham Market and Wells-next-the-Sea remain in good order, and large sections of the route remain in transport use as roadways and drives. For example, at Burnham Market, the former route passes east of the station across a field and is not visible, but the trackbed then survives as a concrete road leading from the south end of Joan Short's Lane to the sewage works, from where it continues as a public footpath through woodland.

Holkham station has been demolished, although the WW2 pill boxes remain. The site of Docking station has been redeveloped as a housing estate, although the station house survives as a private residence, and the route into Wells-next-the-Sea has been partially redeveloped as housing, a school playing field and an industrial estate.
