= Lynn and Hunstanton Railway =

Railway line in Norfolk, England

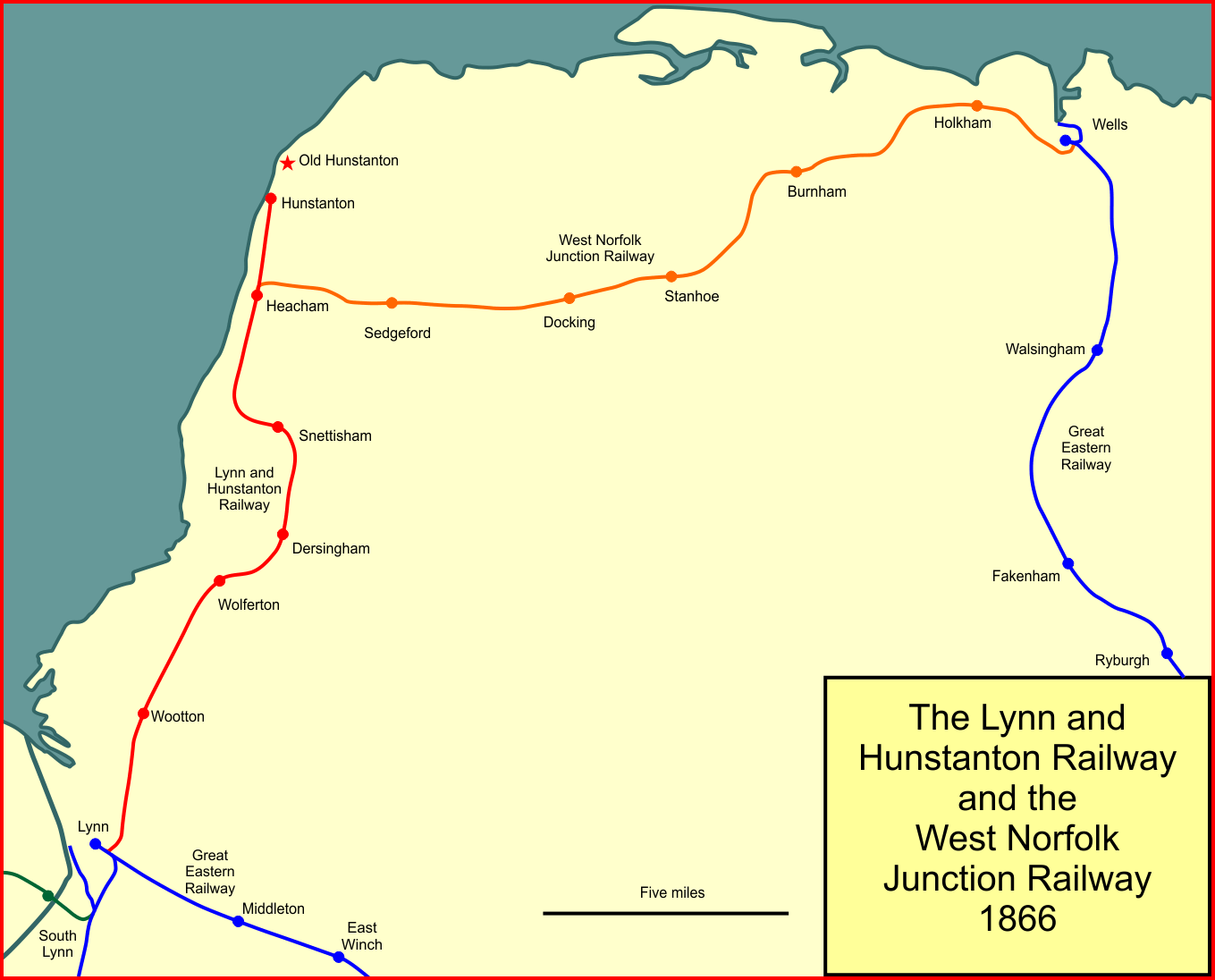
- The Lynn and Hunstanton Railway and the West Norfolk Junction Railway in 1866

Overview
- Locale: East Anglia
- Dates of operation: 1862–1969

Technical
- Track gauge: Standard

The Lynn and Hunstanton Railway was a line connecting King's Lynn and Hunstanton in Norfolk, England that opened in 1862. The railway was a major factor in developing Hunstanton as a seaside resort and residential community. The company was allied to the West Norfolk Junction Railway which built a line connecting Heacham, south of Hunstanton, to Wells-next-the-Sea that was not a financial success. The companies amalgamated in 1874 to form the Hunstanton and West Norfolk Railway, and in 1890 the company was sold to the Great Eastern Railway.

The Prince of Wales, later King Edward VII, acquired an estate at Sandringham, and Wolferton station was used by the Royal Family and visiting heads of state. Hunstanton developed a thriving holiday trade, and day trip excursions became popular. After 1950 decline set in, and the Wells line closed to passengers in 1952; Hunstanton through trains to and from London ended in 1960 and further decline resulted in closure in 1969.

== Promotion and construction ==
In 1846 efforts were made to promote Hunstanton as a seaside resort, and by the mid 1850s businesses were keen to attract visitors. The East Anglian Railways subsidised two omnibus services to Hunstanton from King's Lynn even though the town had a population of fewer than 500 people in 1861.

Lynn and Hunstanton Railway Act 1861
- Act of Parliament
- Parliament of the United Kingdom
- Long title: An Act for making a Railway from Lynn to Hunstanton, all in the County of Norfolk.
- Citation: 24 & 25 Vict. c. cxcix

Dates
- Royal assent: 1 August 1861

The northern part of the Lynn and Ely Railway reached King's Lynn, known locally as Lynn, in 1846. Lynn was 16 miles from Hunstanton and a railway connection was projected. The Lynn and Hunstanton Railway Act 1861 (24 & 25 Vict. c. cxcix) authorising the line from Lynn to Hunstanton gained royal assent on 1 August 1861. The act incorporated the Lynn and Hunstanton Railway Company, with authorised capital of £60,000. The terminus at New Hunstanton, south of the old centre was where development was possible.

The engineer for the line was John Sutherland Valentine. Finance was raised and the first sod was cut on 13 November 1861. Construction over the relatively flat terrain was completed in ten months within budget.

== Opening ==
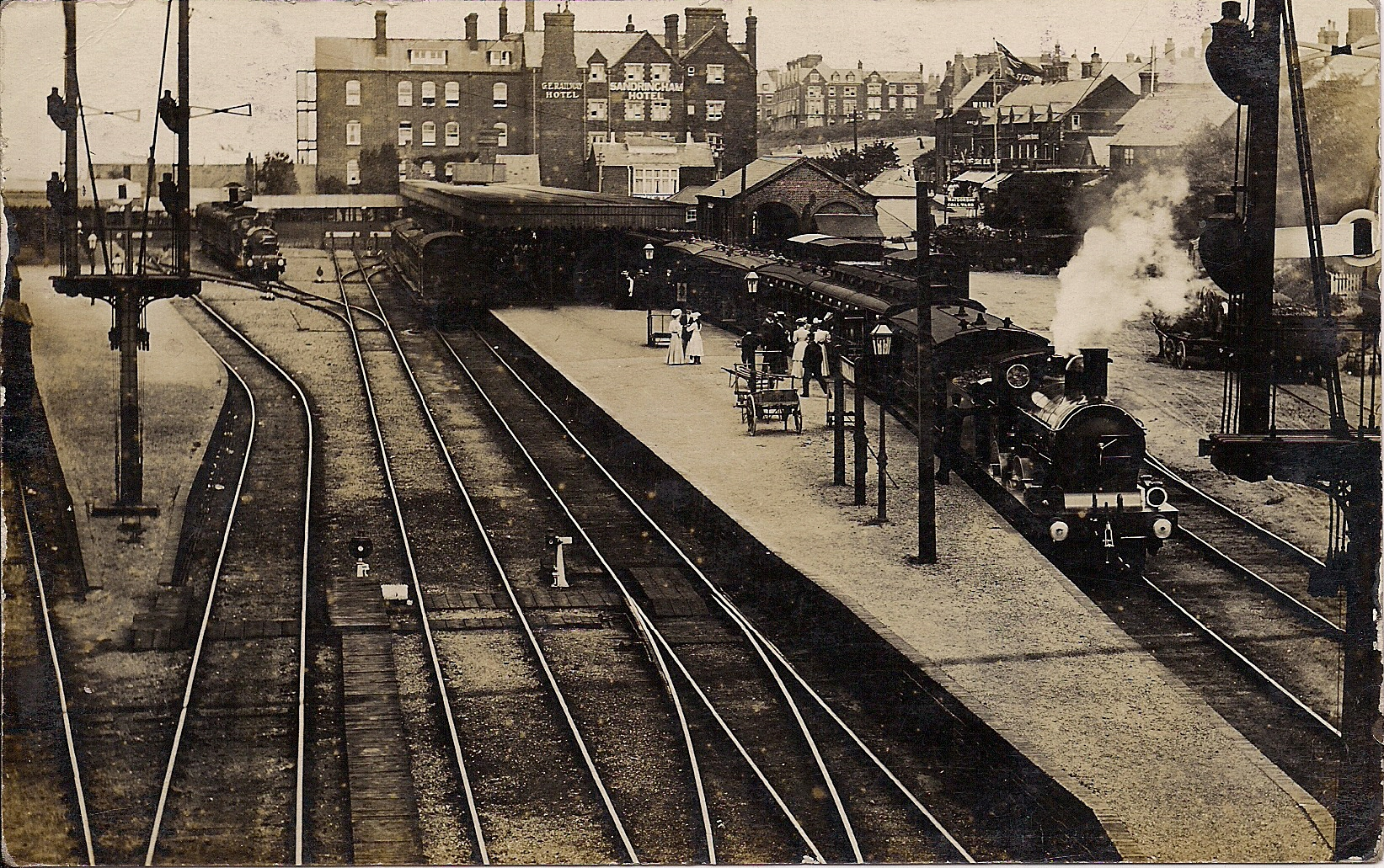
Hunstanton railway station

The Board of Trade inspection, required for passenger operation, took place in September 1862, and the line opened for traffic on 3 October 1862. The line was worked by the Great Eastern Railway for 50% of receipts.

The Times reported:

Railway Intelligence... Lynn and Hunstanton: This line was opened for traffic on Friday. The first train started at a little after noon, and conveyed the directors, contractors, and officers of the company, shareholders and others, to the number of about 150. A luncheon was served at the Hunstanton terminus. The line is 15 miles [24 km] in length from the junction with the East Anglian division of the Great Eastern [Railway] at Gaywood [immediately north of King's Lynn], and its cost amounted altogether to only £80,000. The late Mr. L'Estrange, the proprietor of Hunstanton [Estate], sold the land for about 4 1/2 miles [7.2 km] of the line at its agricultural value, and took the price in shares...

The Wolverton [Wolferton] station is on the estate of the Prince of Wales (through which the line runs for nearly three miles), and is to be enlarged at the expense and for the accommodation of his Royal Highness. The Hunstanton terminus is near the verge of the cliffs. The line is worked by the Great Eastern Railway Company.

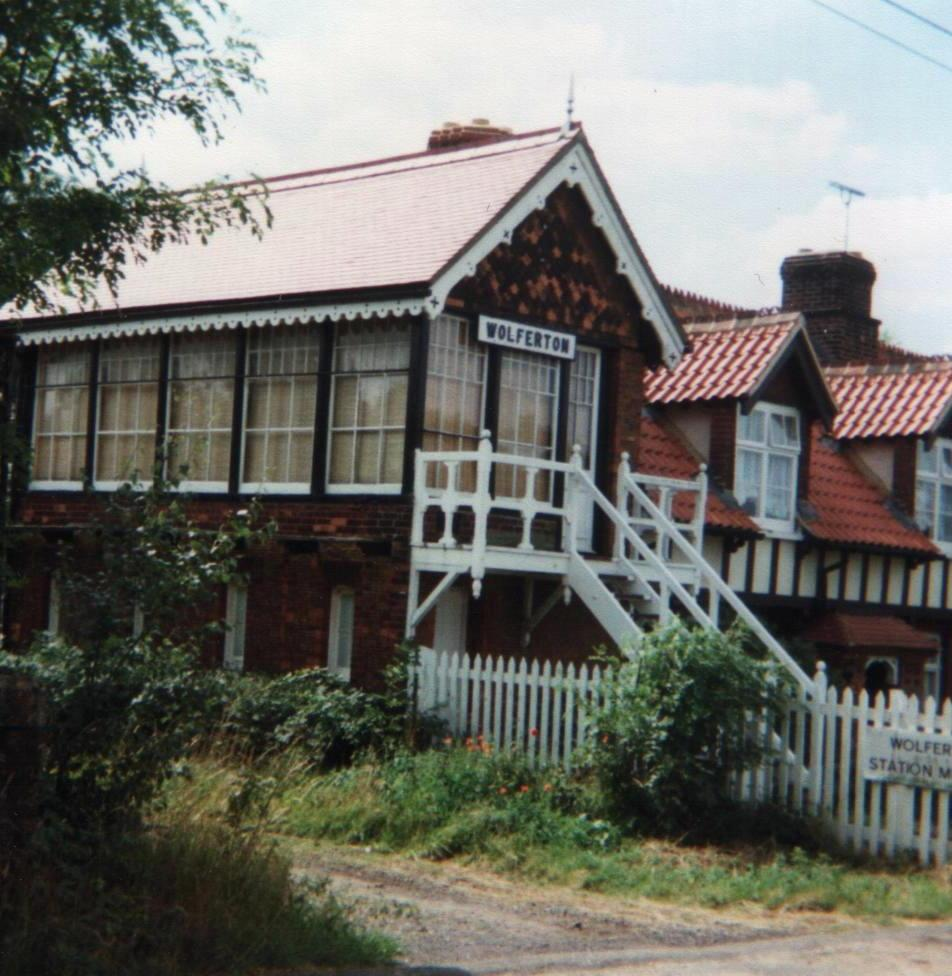
Wolferton signal box

The Sandringham Estate had been purchased in February 1862 for the Prince of Wales, later King Edward VII.

The company was successful and a shareholders' meeting in August 1864, reported receipts of £3,500, and the profit after expenses was £1,372. A dividend of 4.5% was declared; by 1865 dividends of 6% were being distributed.

== Extending to Wells ==
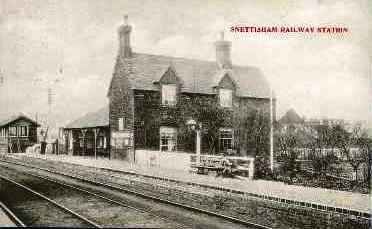
Snettisham railway station

The line's success led businesses to consider whether the North Norfolk coast, eastwards from Hunstanton, could be opened up by a railway. Plans were made for a nominally independent company to build the West Norfolk Junction Railway, a lightly constructed line feeding into the Lynn and Hunstanton Railway, possibly a tramway alongside public roads. A conventional railway was made, and the West Norfolk Junction Railway Act 1864 (27 & 28 Vict. c. xc) obtained royal assent on 23 June 1864. The line ran from Heacham, the first station south of Hunstanton, to the terminus of the Wells and Fakenham Railway at Wells. It was 18 miles long, and the authorised capital was £75,000. The new company could run trains to Hunstanton and Wells Harbour. The Great Eastern Railway subscribed £30,000 and agreed to work the line for 50% of gross receipts.

Construction was swift and on 8 January 1866 the Prince and Princess of Wales had a semi-private journey several months before the official opening when they travelled to Holkham Hall to visit the Earl of Leicester. The first Board of Trade inspection refused consent to open he line because of shortcomings in the signalling arrangements. After they were rectified, the line opened 17 August 1866.

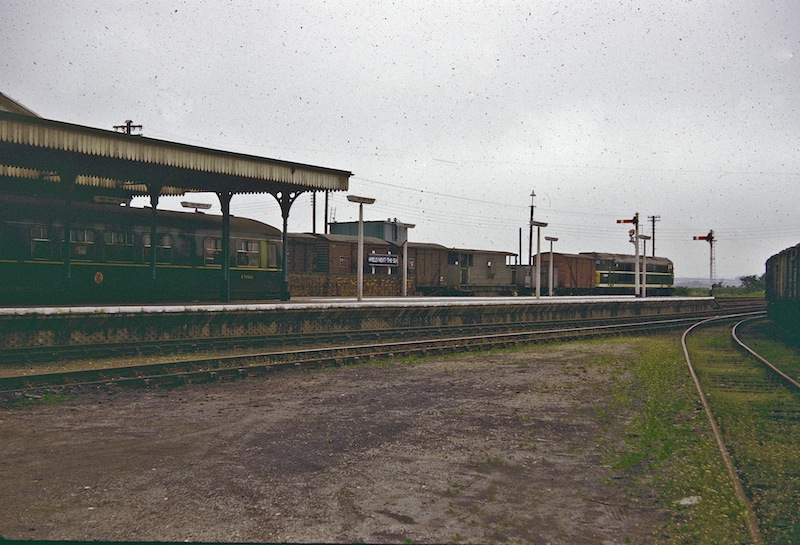
Wells-next-the-Sea railway station

The line curved sharply north at Wells to use Wells and Fakenham Railway station on the line that had opened in 1857. Another platform was provided for West Norfolk trains. Triangular junctions were planned at Heacham and Wells, but although a west curve formation was made at Wells, no track was laid, and no work was done at Heacham. At Heacham the line faced away from Hunstanton.

There were generally four trains each way between Wells and Heacham, five on Saturdays and market days. In the earliest days passenger trains ran from Lynn to Wells via Hunstanton, passing Heacham twice; but soon most services terminated at Heacham apart from one through working to Hunstanton, which continued northwards after reversal at the junction. Goods services consisted of one return working between King's Lynn and Wells.

The financial crisis in 1866 following the failure of Overend, Gurney and Company's bank and an outbreak of cattle plague in North Norfolk hit the company's income: receipts amounted to £1,355 for the final quarter year of 1866, and no dividend was paid. After the financial success of the Lynn and Hunstanton line, this was a disappointment but the course of the line, which was some distance from the coast and the towns and villages situated on it, militated against its use for goods and passenger purposes.

== Amalgamations ==
Lynn and Hunstanton and West Norfolk Junction Railway Act 1874
- Act of Parliament
- Parliament of the United Kingdom
- Long title: An Act to authorise the Amalgamation of the Lynn and Hunstanton and West Norfolk Junction Railway Companies; and for other purposes.
- Citation: 37 & 38 Vict. c. xiii

Dates
- Royal assent: 8 June 1874

Text of statute as originally enacted

Great Eastern, Hunstanton and West Norfolk Railway Companies Act 1890
- Act of Parliament
- Parliament of the United Kingdom
- Long title: An Act for the sale and transfer to the Great Eastern Railway Company of the Undertaking of the Hunstanton and West Norfolk Railway Company and for other purposes.
- Citation: 53 & 54 Vict. c. xiii

Dates
- Royal assent: 22 May 1890

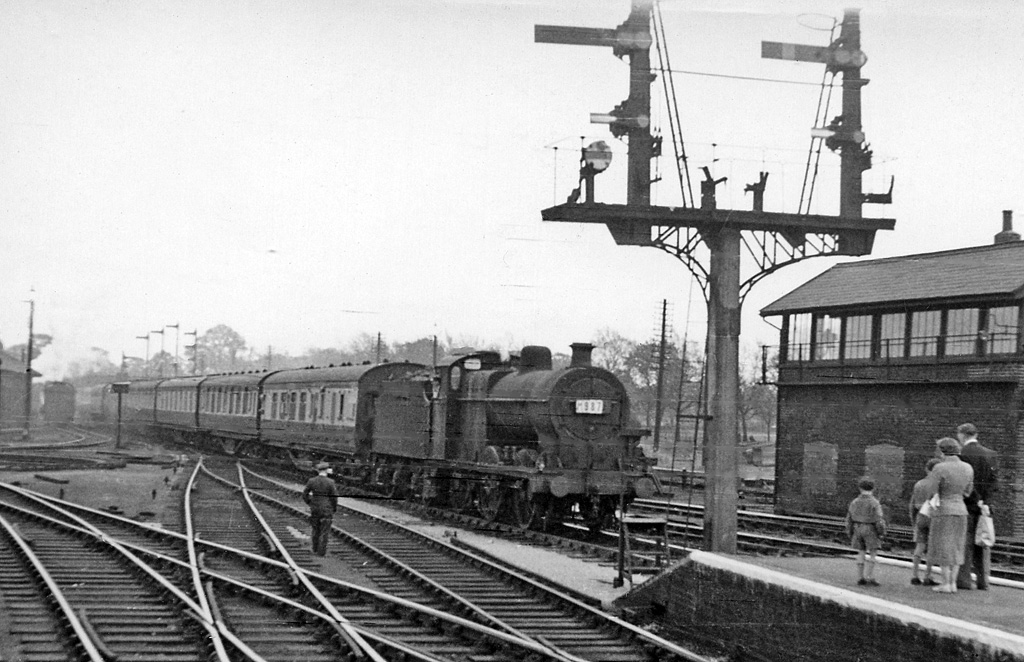
An excursion train from Coalville to Hunstanton, entering King's Lynn station in 1956

The West Norfolk Railway was allied with the Lynn and Hunstanton Railway, and they amalgamated by the Lynn and Hunstanton and West Norfolk Junction Railway Act 1874 (37 & 38 Vict. c. xiii) of 8 June 1874, becoming the Hunstanton and West Norfolk Railway. The Lynn and Hunstanton main line was relatively successful but smaller railways became more fragile in the latter decades of the 19th century, and on 1 July 1890 the Lynn and Hunstanton Railway was sold to the Great Eastern Railway for £160,000 and £5,000 for legal expenses, authorised by the Great Eastern, Hunstanton and West Norfolk Railway Companies Act 1890 (53 & 54 Vict. c. xiii).

== Growth from 1890 ==
In the final years of the century, Hunstanton developed as a holiday resort, not only for holiday stays, but many wealthy business people lived there and travelled to London for business. Golfing stays at Hunstanton became popular and from 1905, a Sunday restaurant car express from London was provided specifically for golfers. As traffic developed, the track was doubled over the southern part of the line and completed between King's Lynn and Wolferton in 1898.

The Royal Family spent a lot of time at Sandringham. Royal trains reversed at King's Lynn where operation by local engines and crews took over. In London they ran to St Pancras station over the Tottenham and Hampstead Junction Railway line. Liverpool Street station was not used because royalty entering the City of London required ceremonial procedures, which were not always expedient. Between 1884 and 1911, 645 royal trains used Wolferton station. Ordinary express passenger trains ran to St Pancras, or conveyed coaches for St Pancras that were slipped at Tottenham Hale or detached there. In the 1930s, Sunday excursions, particularly Sunday schools, and long distance holiday trains became dominant.

West Norfolk trains terminated at Heacham, not usually running through to Hunstanton. There was no runround facility at Wells and after disembarking the passengers, the engine propelled the coaches back up the gradient, and after shunting the engine, the coaches were run down to the station by gravity.

Pullman cars were run on some trains from 1921, but were not popular. From 1929, a day excursion train from London, the Eastern Belle, ran to different seaside destinations from day to day, and typically visited Hunstanton every two weeks on a Tuesday. In 1937 Hunstanton station was enlarged. Its four platforms were lengthened, and accommodation for passenger stock and locomotives was extended. After World War II there was heavy holiday traffic on the line, especially on Sundays, when a one way system was operated: nearly all incoming trains ran in the morning and all outgoing trains in the afternoon and evening. From 1949 a named train, The Fenman ran from Liverpool Street to Hunstanton. Heacham also began to develop as a holiday destination.

== Decline after 1950 ==
Poor passenger business on the West Norfolk line resulted in closure to passengers; the last passenger trains ran on Saturday 31 May 1952; but a special Pilgrims' train ran from Kettering to Walsingham on 29 June 1952. Heavy flooding in early 1953 caused the line to be breached at Holkham. The line was not reinstated as it was only open to goods traffic; the stub from Heacham to Burnham was retained for goods traffic, but was closed after 28 December 1964. The 1953 floods engulfed a train on the main line north of Heacham on 31 January 1953; the train was stranded, and the line was not repaired until 23 February 1953.

On the main line, diesel multiple units were introduced from 3 November 1958, and through trains from Liverpool Street to Hunstanton were withdrawn in November 1960, the branch passenger service was operated as a shuttle from King's Lynn. Operation as a basic railway was brought in from 6 June 1966 in an attempt to contain costs.

Hunstanton station was reduced to a single platform from 12 February 1967 and reductions in operating facilities followed when the one engine in steam system was instituted from Wolferton to Hunstanton on 5 March 1967. King's Lynn to Wolferton was reduced to single track on 2 April 1967 when the line was worked as a single section and a no-signalman key token instrument was placed at Hunstanton. Despite this an investment of £25,000 was made that year in the shape of automatic half-barrier level crossing gates. All freight was withdrawn on the line in 1964. The line closed on 5 May 1969.

== Restoration efforts ==
There has been an ongoing interest in restoring the line. In 1993 the local council expressed interest in protecting the rail formation from development that could block restoration, but early efforts to re-open the line, endorsed by actor Bill Pertwee, were met with hostility by several people who had purchased properties along the former route.

In 2018 a formal campaign to restore the railway was launched. In September 2019 Norfolk County Council began a study into the restoration of the rail link between King's Lynn and Hunstanton, despite noting the challenges of any reconstruction.

A bid was made in November 2020 for funding from the second round of the Restoring Your Railway fund. It was unsuccessful, with transport minister Chris Heaton-Harris stating that the case needed strengthening, but that "the proposal has potential." In March 2021, a bid was submitted to restore the line from Kings Lynn to Hunstanton as part of the third round of the Restoring Your Railway fund. The King's Lynn Docks announced their support for the restoration of the line, coupled to the restoration of the dock's railway branch.

Despite the implied support of the 1993 protection of the route, the ongoing efforts to restore the line and national level listing of the project, a public house was allowed to be constructed on the formation at Hunstanton and in 2020 plans were released for flats to be built on the former station site.

== Topography ==
Main line:

- Lynn; opened 27 October 1846; relocated 27 August 1871; renamed King's Lynn 1911;
- Salters Road Junction; connection to the Alexandra Dock branch;
- Gaywood Junction; former divergence of the Lynn and Fakenham Railway;
- Wootton; opened 3 October 1862; renamed North Wootton July 1869; closed 5 May 1969;
- Wolverton; opened 3 October 1862; renamed Wolferton 15 July 1863; closed 5 May 1969;
- Dersingham; opened 3 October 1862; closed 5 May 1969;
- Snettisham; opened 3 October 1862; closed 5 May 1969;
- Heacham; opened 3 October 1862; closed 5 May 1969;
- Hunstanton; opened 3 October 1862; closed 5 May 1969;

Extension:

- Heacham; above;
- Sedgeford; opened 17 August 1866; closed 2 June 1952;
- Docking; opened 17 August 1866; closed 2 June 1952;
- Stanhoe; opened 17 August 1866; closed 2 June 1952;
- Burnham; opened 17 August 1866; renamed Burnham Market 1 June 1883; closed 2 June 1952;
- Holkham; opened 17 August 1866; closed 2 June 1952;
- Wells; opened by Wells and Fakenham Railway 1 December 1857; renamed Wells-on-Sea 1 July 1923; renamed Wells-next-the-Sea 1 January 1957; closed 5 October 1964.
