= Holkham railway station =

Former railway station in Norfolk, England

Coordinates: 52.9622°N 0.8151°E

Holkham
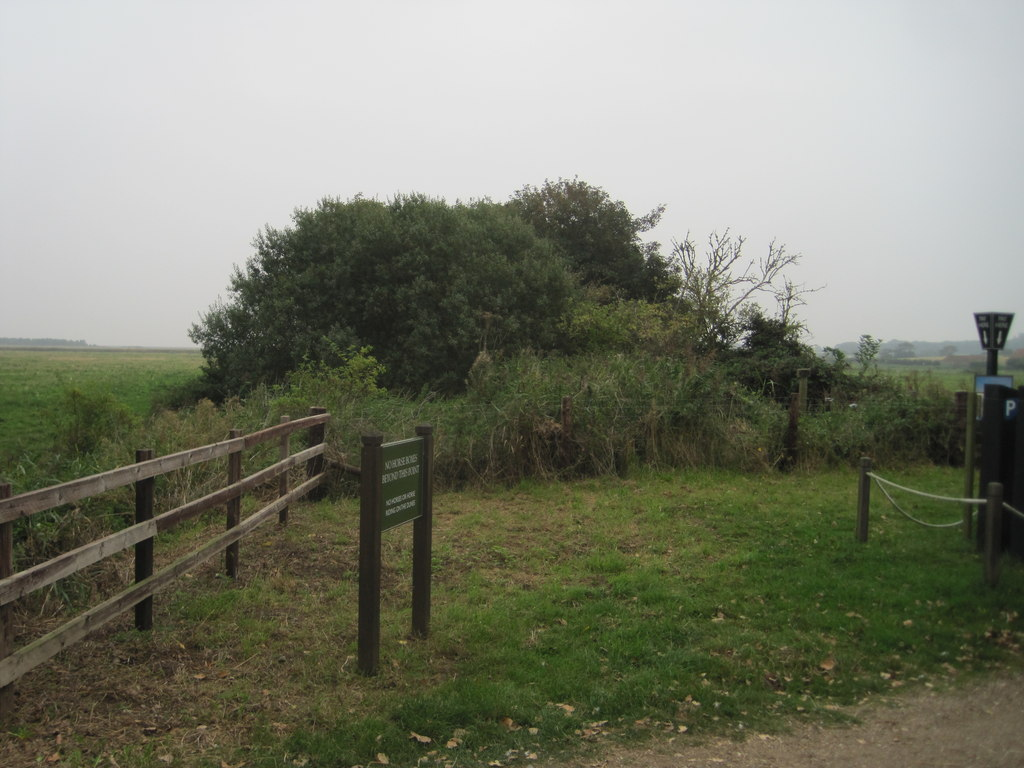
- The site of the station in 2014

General information
- Location: Holkham, North Norfolk, Norfolk; England
- Grid reference: TF891442
- Platforms: 1

Other information
- Status: Disused

History
- Original company: West Norfolk Junction Railway
- Pre-grouping: Great Eastern Railway
- Post-grouping: London and North Eastern Railway; Eastern Region of British Railways

Key dates
- 17 August 1866: Opened
- 2 June 1952: Closed
Location

Holkham was a railway station which served the coastal village of Holkham in Norfolk, England. Opened by the West Norfolk Junction railway in 1866, it closed with the line in 1952.

== History ==
The construction of the West Norfolk Junction Railway was prompted by the success of the Lynn and Hunstanton Railway which had opened in 1862 to link King's Lynn with the seaside town of Hunstanton. The West Norfolk opened in 1866 at the start of a major financial crisis triggered by the collapse of Overend Gurney Bank; the year also saw the outbreak of a "cattle plague" in North Norfolk which impacted on the cattle receipts on the line. The West Norfolk was absorbed into the Lynn and Hunstanton Railway in 1872 which in turn was acquired by the Great Eastern Railway in 1890. The line eventually closed to passengers in 1952, a consequence of rising costs and falling passenger numbers, aggravated by the inconvenient siting of stations. Up to the end of its passenger services, the line was one of the last where one could travel in gas-lit clerestory coaches hauled by Victorian locomotives.

A freight service continued to operate until 1953, though it was cut back to Heacham/Burnham Market after the North Sea flood of 1953 which badly damaged the section between Holkham and Wells, damage which British Rail judged not worth repairing.

At Holkham the railway line curved away from the main village centre dominated by Holkham Hall, and followed a path nearer the coast. The line had been opposed by the occupant of Holkham Hall, the Earl of Leicester, who feared that it would lead to large scale resort development and an influx of holiday visitors near his home. A station was nevertheless opened opposite the main gates of Holkham Park which had been laid out by Thomas Coke who had reclaimed from the sea some of the land over which the railway now ran. The station's approach road, Lady Ann's Drive, continued for around half a mile to the beach at Holkham Gap. The station itself was very small, equipped with a single platform and no goods facilities. Architecturally, it was a miniature version of the Great Eastern's "Victorian House" design, incorporating a small platform canopy. There was a level crossing over Lady Ann's Road which was controlled by a wooden signal box.

During the Second World War, the railway's strategic coastal location meant that it provided a natural 'rampart' behind which a potential beach invasion could be repelled. For this reason, a line of pillboxes were constructed along the railway.

Preceding station	Disused railways	Following station
Burnham Market; Line and station closed	British Rail; Eastern Region; Heacham to Wells line	Wells-next-the-Sea; Line and station closed

== Present day ==
The station buildings have been demolished, and the trackbed to the west of the station has been converted into a farm track.

== See also ==
- List of closed railway stations in Norfolk
