= Hunstanton railway station =

Former railway station in Norfolk, England

Coordinates: 52.9381°N 0.4861°E

Hunstanton
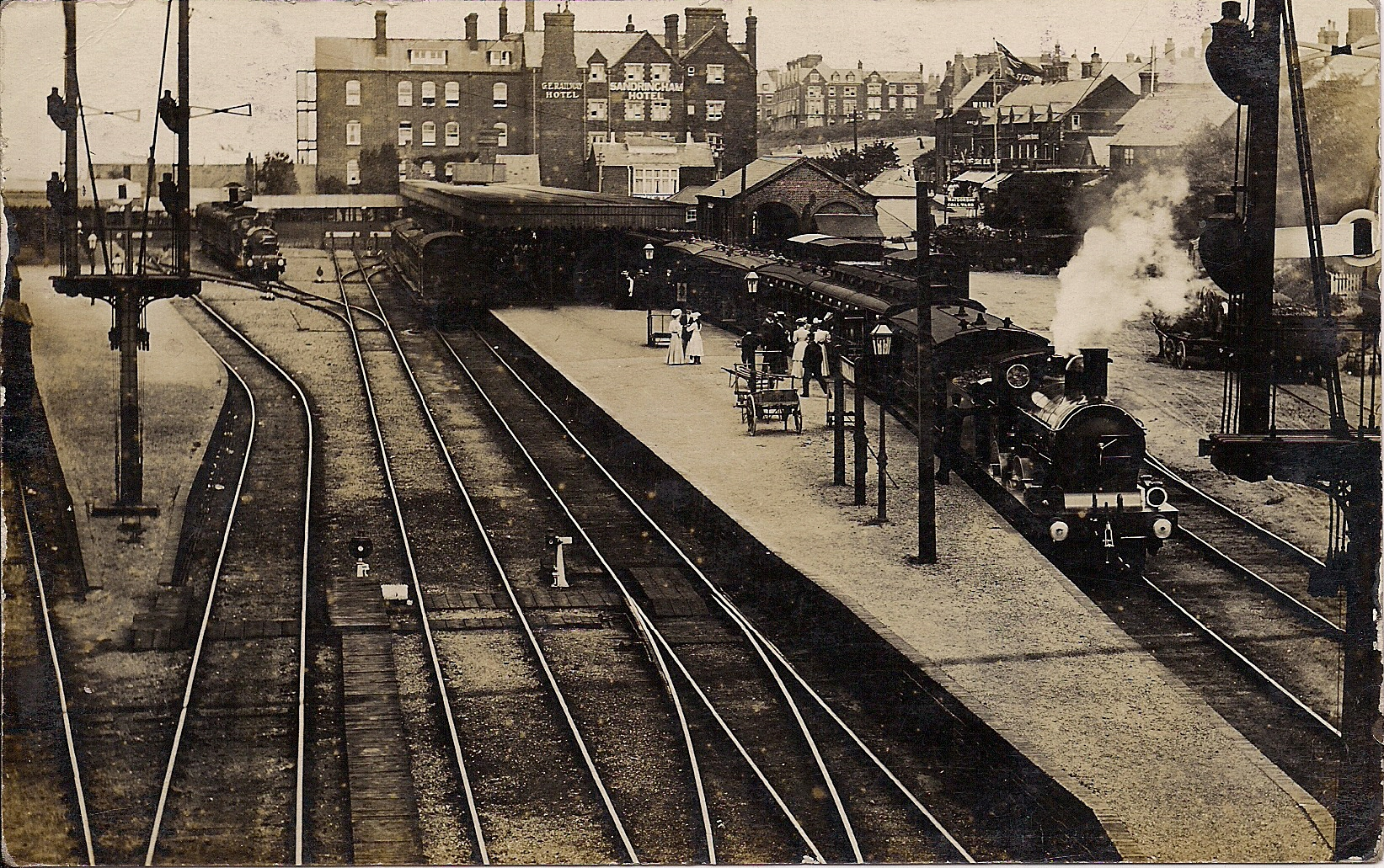
- Hunstanton in the early 1900s; Sandringham Hotel in the background.

General information
- Location: Hunstanton, Norfolk; England
- Grid reference: TF671407
- Platforms: 4

Other information
- Status: Disused

History
- Original company: Lynn and Hunstanton Railway
- Pre-grouping: Great Eastern Railway
- Post-grouping: London and North Eastern Railway; Eastern Region of British Railways

Key dates
- 3 October 1862: Opened
- 28 December 1964: Closed to freight
- 6 June 1966: Became unstaffed
- 5 May 1969: Closed to passengers
Location

Hunstanton railway station served the seaside town of Hunstanton in Norfolk, England. Opened in 1862, the station was the northern terminus of the Lynn and Hunstanton Railway. The line was brought to public notice by John Betjeman in the British Transport Film John Betjeman Goes By Train. The station closed with the line in 1969.

== History ==
Construction of the line to Hunstanton coincided with the rising popularity of north-west Norfolk as a destination for holidaymakers who were arriving in large numbers. Hunstanton was promoted as a seaside resort by Henry Styleman Le Strange (1815–1862), lord of the manor and principal landowner, who gifted land and money towards the line's construction. The station had two long island platforms which could take excursion trains with up to a thousand people aboard, and its seafront location meant that passengers were discharged directly on to the promenade and pier. Long-stay holidaymakers came and left on Saturdays, whilst day-trippers generally came on Sundays in a constant stream of trains at ten-minute intervals. Many stayed at the Sandringham Hotel which was situated at the end of the platforms.

The single-track line into Hunstanton ran almost straight into the station, with beach huts and bungalows on the seaward side and rolling hills on the other. Nearer the seafront the line crossed South Beach Road on the level, before entering the station whose twin island platforms, covered by Great Eastern flat-topped canopies, diverged in a roughly triangular arrangement. As well as its four main terminal roads, there were five goods sidings to the east of the platforms which served as carriage sidings at the height of the summer season. The sidings converged into a single headshunt which led southwards to Hunstanton Gas Works. A long siding on the eastern side of the station served cattle docks and an end-loading bay.

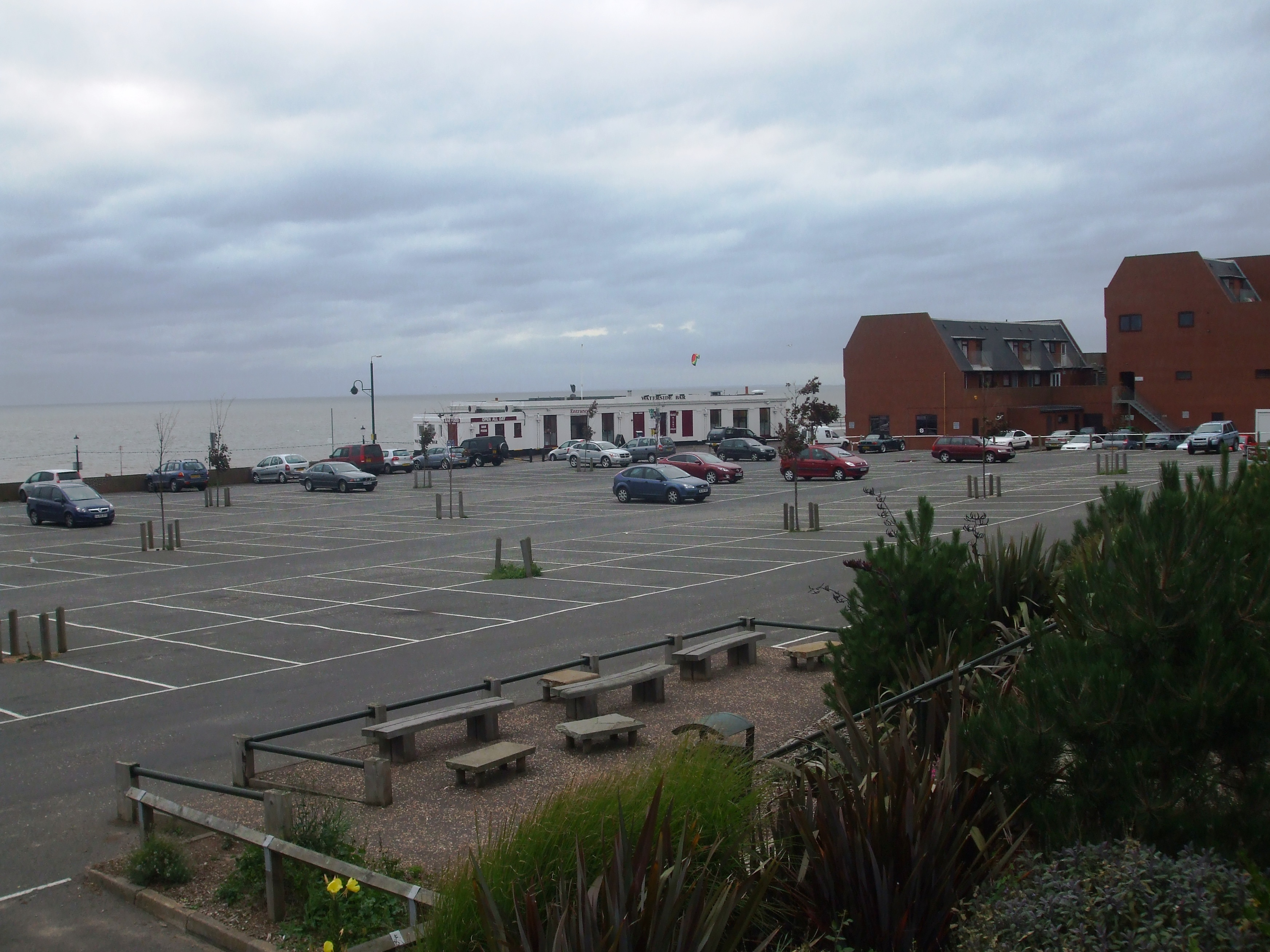
Site of Hunstanton station, now a car park.

Having reached its peak in the mid-1950s, passenger numbers declined. Most through services from Liverpool Street were withdrawn from 1959, leaving Hunstanton with a mainly DMU service to and from King's Lynn. By 1966, services to London had been reduced to one working on weekdays and two up and one down on summer Saturdays. Although the line was not included in the Beeching Report, the line became uneconomic and efforts were made by British Rail to reduce the losses made by the line with the implementation of the "basic railway" concept, whereby stations became unstaffed, signal boxes were closed and from 2 March 1967 the line was singled. At Hunstanton, the removal of most of the sidings and stabling facilities meant that through-locomotive excursion trains could no longer be run. As fewer and fewer passengers were using the line, British Rail announced that the line was losing £40,000 per year and would close from Monday 5 May 1969. The last train ran at 9.05pm on Saturday 3 May from King's Lynn packed with around 250 passengers and a similar number waiting at Hunstanton to mark the occasion.

Preceding station	Disused railways	Following station
Heacham; Line and station closed	British Rail; Eastern Region; King's Lynn to Hunstanton branch	Terminus

== Present day ==
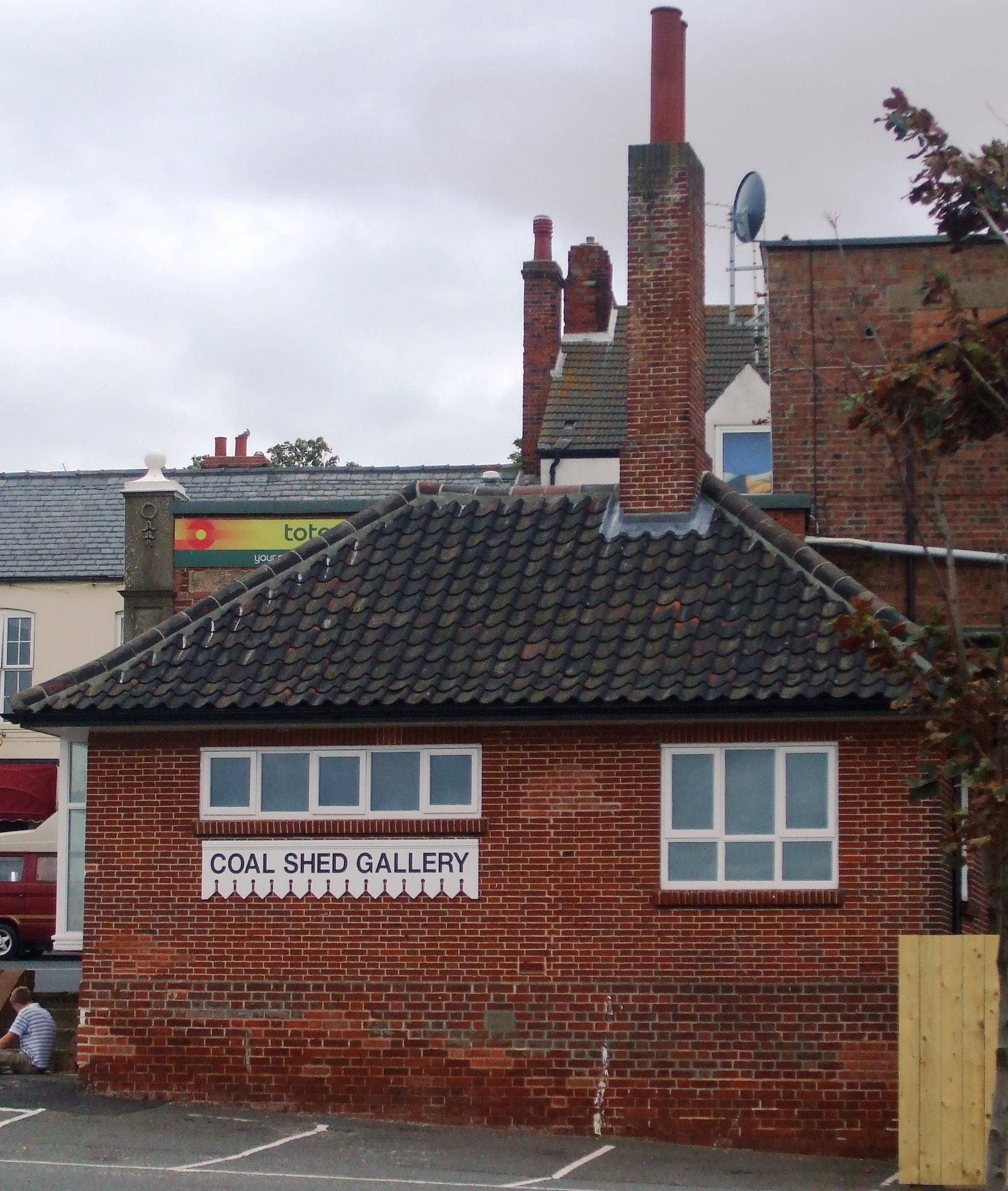
Former station coal shed, now an art gallery.

The station site is now a car and coach park. The former coal shed, the only remaining trace of the railway, was converted into an art gallery with help from West Norfolk Council and opened in May 2008. The first exhibition celebrated the King's Lynn to Hunstanton railway line with a display of memorabilia and photographs.

In January 2019, Campaign for Better Transport released a report in which the line to Hunstanton was listed as "Priority 2" for reopening. ("Priority 2" refers to those lines which require further development or a change in circumstances).
