= Wells-next-the-Sea railway station =

Former railway station in North Norfolk, England

Wells-next-the-Sea
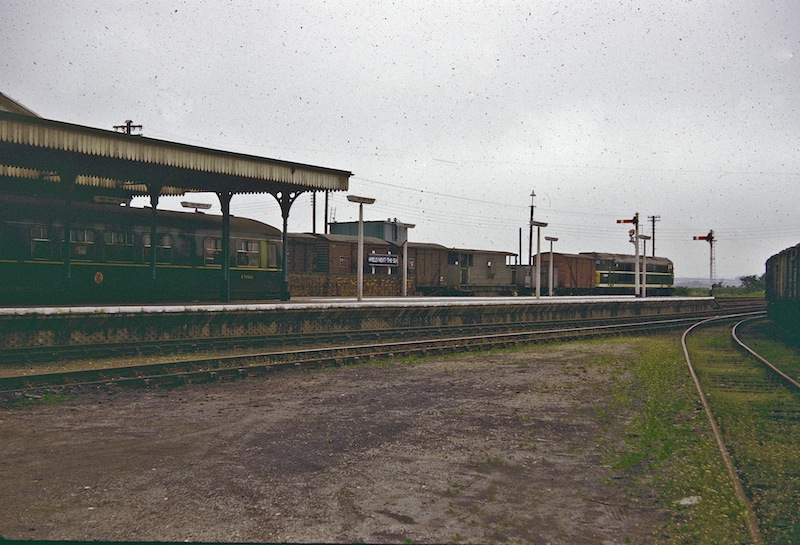
- The station in 1963

General information
- Location: Wells-next-the-Sea, North Norfolk, Norfolk; England
- Coordinates: 52.953°N 0.857°E
- Grid reference: TF920433
- Platforms: 3

Other information
- Status: Disused

History
- Original company: Wells and Fakenham Railway
- Pre-grouping: Great Eastern Railway
- Post-grouping: London and North Eastern Railway, Eastern Region of British Railways

Key dates
- 1 December 1857: Opened as Wells
- 1 July 1923: Renamed Wells-on-Sea
- 1 January 1957: Renamed Wells-next-the-Sea
- 5 October 1964: Closed for passengers
- 2 November 1964: Closed for freight
Location

Wells-next-the-Sea was a railway station that served the port town of Wells-next-the-Sea, in North Norfolk, England. It was opened in 1857 by the Wells and Fakenham Railway, later part of the Great Eastern Railway's Wymondham to Wells branch, and became a junction in 1866 with the arrival of the West Norfolk Junction Railway. It was closed in 1964.

== Opening ==
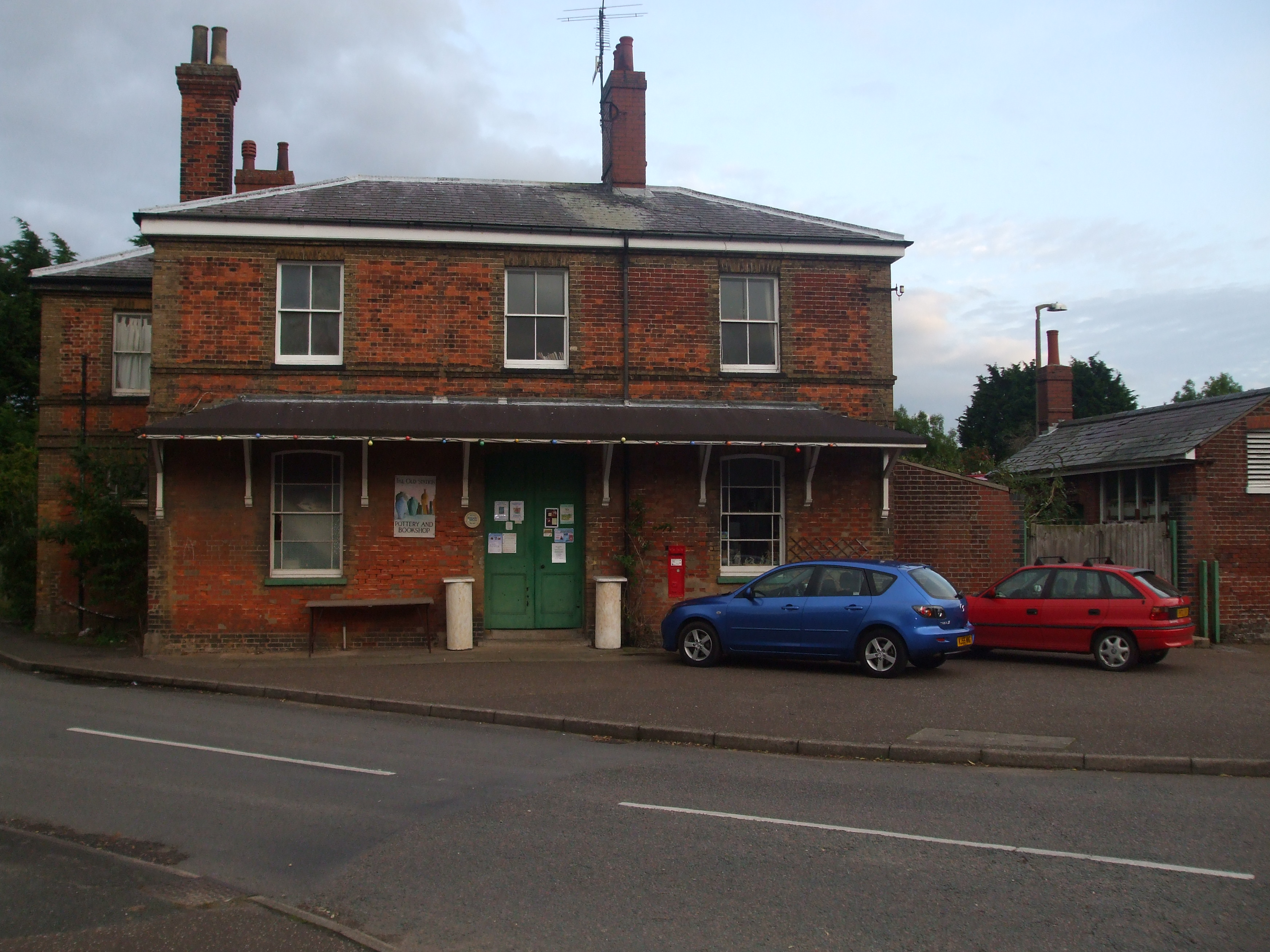
The former station in 2007

Wells was first linked with the railway in 1857, when the Wells and Fakenham Railway opened a line to Fakenham East, largely driven by the efforts of Lord Leicester and the directors of the railway company.

It was originally planned to have been open on 1 June 1857, but negotiations with the Eastern Counties Railway, which would operate the line, delayed it until 1 December 1857. They hoped that the railway would help reverse the declining fortunes of the town; its inability to take ships of increasing size saw it overtaken by other ports. The decline continued, notwithstanding the construction of a short branch line to Wells Harbour in 1860.

In 1862, the Wells and Fakenham Railway became part of the Great Eastern Railway, a move which brought greater importance to the Wells line by providing a north–south connection with London's increasing food markets.

The West Norfolk Junction Railway was the next to come to Wells, on 17 August 1866. The line came from Heacham on an 18 1/2-mile (29.8 km) single track aimed at exploiting the great arc of coastline between Hunstanton and Yarmouth. This line entered Wells on a sharp curve, turning through a full 180 degrees before converging with the Wells & Fakenham branch from Dereham for the final approach. West Norfolk services used the outer face of a sheltered wooden island platform to the south of the station, with the inner face for services to Dereham and Wymondham. The Dereham side was unusual in that there was a platform on either side of the train, allowing the passengers the choice of which side to alight from, much the same as Ventnor and Ulverston stations.

== Facilities ==
The main red brick two-storey L-shaped Georgian-style station buildings were constructed at right angles to the platform ends and incorporated a stationmaster's residence.

Wells had a combined engine shed and goods shed, with the locomotives having use of the whole shed when not required for goods. This adjoined the main station building on the Wells & Fakenham platform side. In 1929, the original 42-foot-long (13 m) turntable was replaced by a second-hand 45-foot-long (14 m) version. This lay just to the north of the station, and was capable of accommodating the former Great Eastern's Claud Hamilton locomotives and other 4-4-0 classes, but not the B12s or other large engines. Wells was an outstation of Norwich depot and there were up to five locomotives based there. The shed officially closed in September 1955 and has since been demolished.

== Operations ==
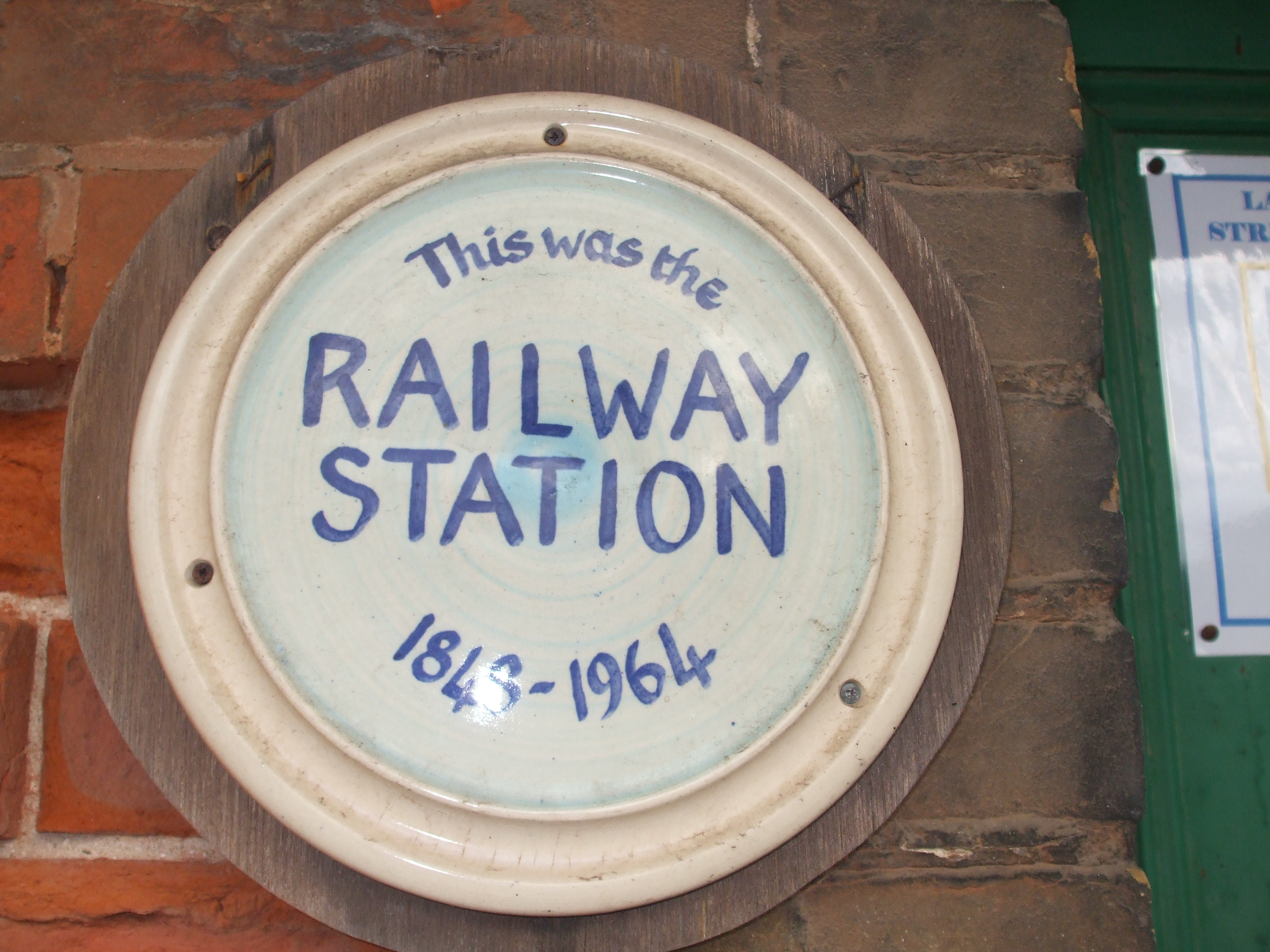
A plaque on the station building

Wells was a busy terminus station for almost 100 years, with a dozen or so passenger trains calling each day and goods trains from the harbour.

An accident took place at Wells station on 29 May 1879, when the 7:50 pm train from Norwich ran away on the steep gradient approaching the terminus, smashed through the buffers at the end of the line and entered the station building through the porter's room and toilets. No passengers were injured, but a young man named George Cooke was killed in the station toilets. Repairs can still be seen in the brickwork.

Messrs Dewing & Kersley opened a corn mill adjacent to the station in 1904; the smell of animal feedstuffs often wafted into the station to mix with the smoke, steam and hot oil odours given off by the locomotives, and the fishy smells coming from the Stiffkey Blues cockles loaded into the guards' vans of trains.

The post-war boom experienced by the King's Lynn to Hunstanton line was not felt on the West Norfolk Junction Railway, whose inconveniently sited stations contributed to declining passenger traffic. Passenger services between Wells and Heacham were withdrawn from 2 June 1952, but the line remained open to freight. In the North Sea flood of 1953, the track between Wells and Holkham was so severely damaged that British Railways considered it not worth repairing and the line was closed completely between these two places. The station closed a little over ten years later when the line from Dereham to Wells closed to passenger traffic on 5 October 1964; freight continued until the end of the month.

Preceding station	Disused railways	Following station
Holkham; Line and station closed	British Rail; Eastern Region; Heacham to Wells branch	Terminus
Terminus	British Rail; Eastern Region; Wymondham to Wells via East Dereham	Wighton Halt; Line and station closed

== Present day ==
In 2007, the station building was a second-hand bookshop and pottery, with the site of the platforms an industrial estate known as Great Eastern Way. The old corn mill was used as a furniture warehouse, before being converted into flats. Part of the ground floor is occupied by Wells Antiques Centre and Glaven Veterinary Centre.

=== Wells and Walsingham Light Railway ===
Since 1982, there has been a newer station at Wells, which is the terminus of the narrow gauge Wells and Walsingham Light Railway. This station is located just south of where the original standard-gauge line crossed the main A149 coast road on the level.
