= Fransham (disambiguation) =

Fransham may refer to:

- Fransham, a civil parish in Norfolk, England
- Great Fransham, a village in Fransham parish
- Little Fransham, another village in the same parish
- Fransham railway station, a former station located in Great Fransham

== People with the surname ==
- Ben Fransham (born 20th century), New Zealand actor
- John Fransham (1730–1810), English freethinker

== See also ==
- Frankham
- Frensham
