= Bilney railway station =

Disused railway station in West Bilney, Norfolk, England

Coordinates: 52.70724°N 0.54982°E

Bilney
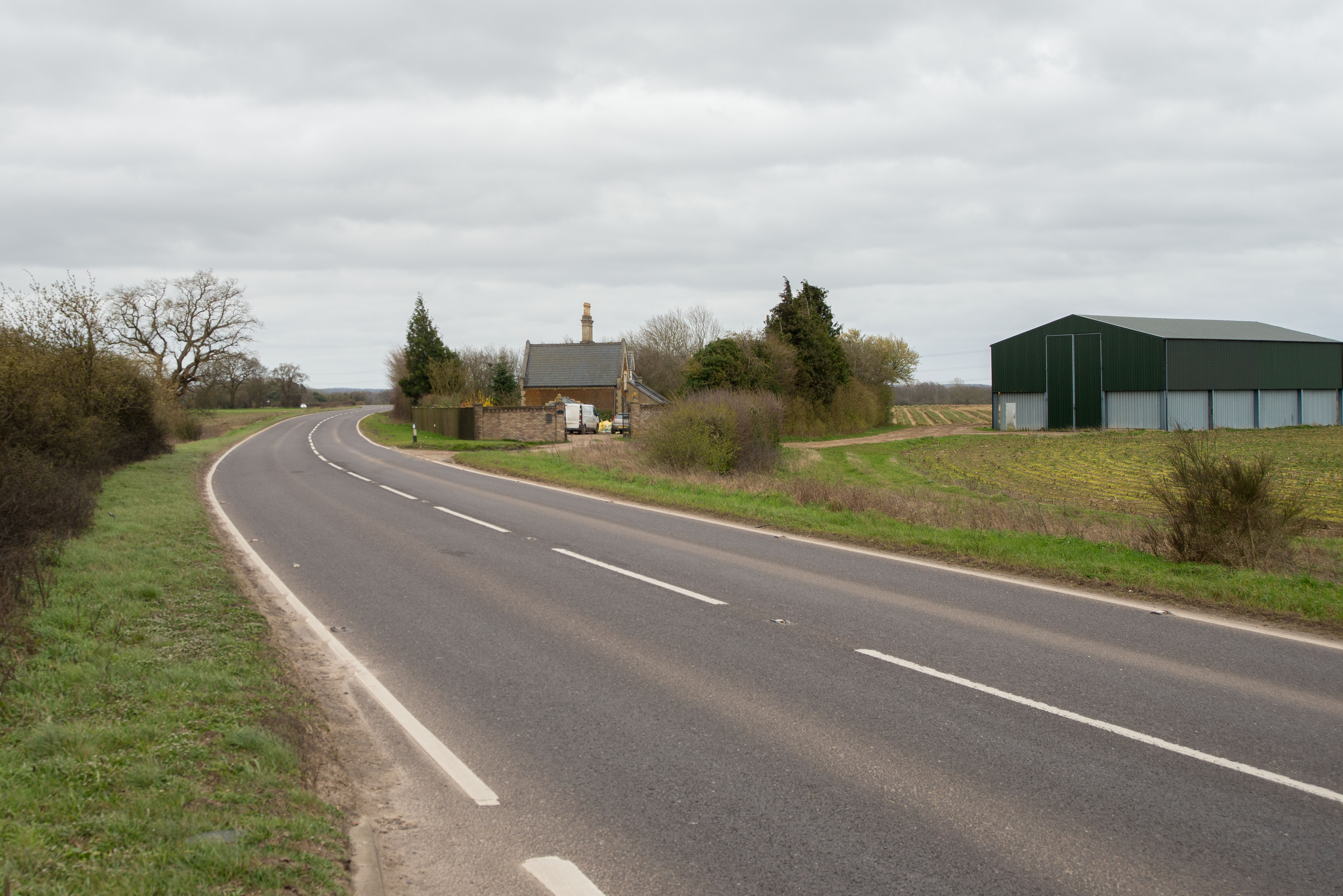

General information
- Location: West Bilney, Norfolk; England

Other information
- Status: Disused

History
- Original company: Lynn and Dereham Railway; East Anglian Railways
- Pre-grouping: Great Eastern Railway

Key dates
- 27 Oct 1846: Opened
- 1 Aug 1866: Closed
Location

Bilney railway station was located on the line between East Winch and Narborough and Pentney. It served the village of West Bilney, and closed in 1866.

Preceding station	Disused railways	Following station
East Winch; Line and station closed	Great Eastern Railway; Lynn and Dereham Railway	Narborough and Pentney; Line and station closed

== History ==
The bill for the Lynn and Dereham Railway (L&DR) received royal assent on 21 July 1845. The line and its stations were opened on 27 October 1846 as far as Narborough. Bilney station opened with the line. The L&DR was taken over by the East Anglian Railways on 22 July 1847. Nineteen days later, on 10 August 1847, the line reached Swaffham.
