= Fransham railway station =

Former railway station in England

Coordinates: 52.6862°N 0.7925°E

Fransham
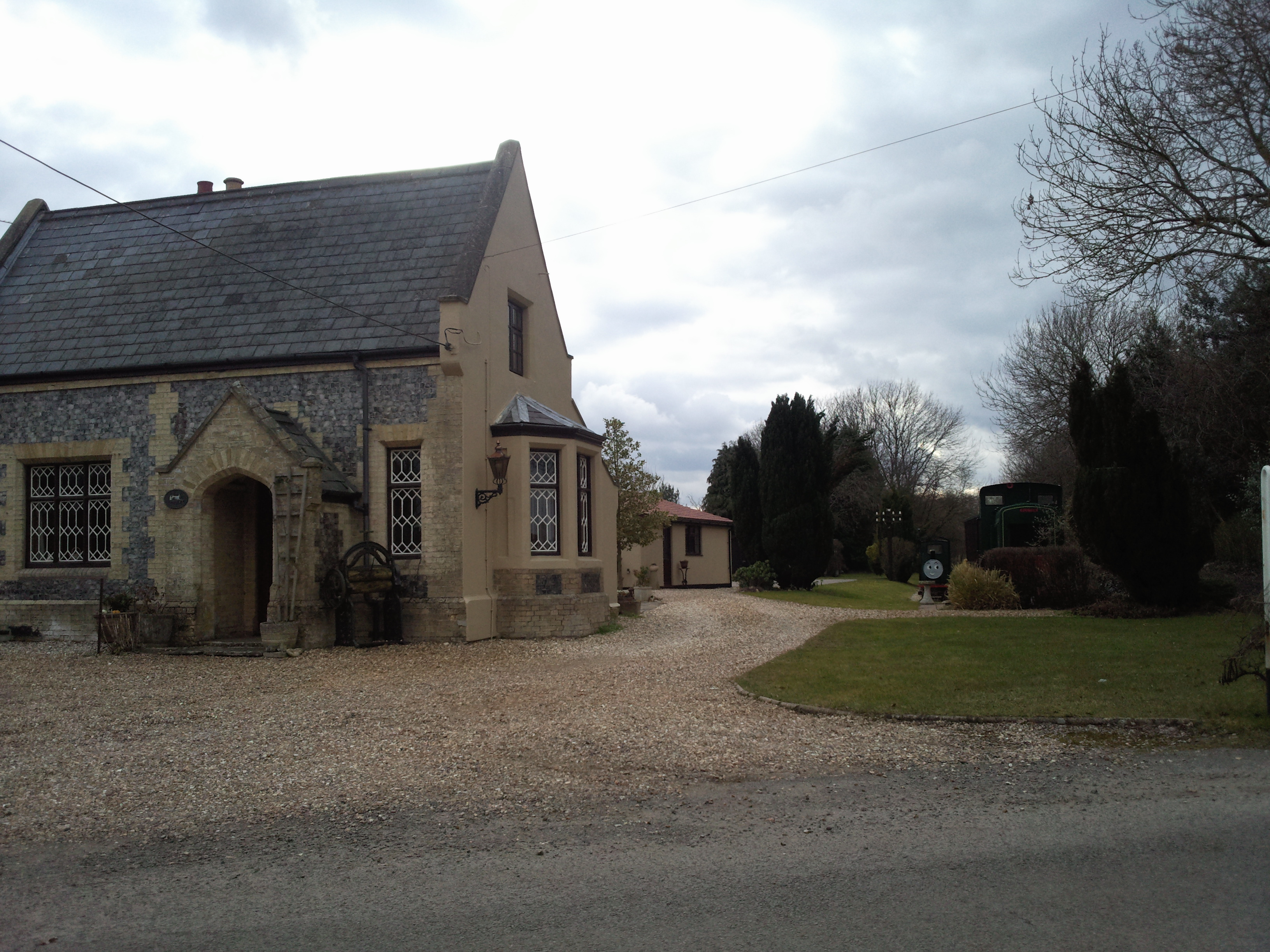

General information
- Location: Fransham, Norfolk; England
- Platforms: 1

Other information
- Status: Disused

History
- Original company: Lynn and Dereham Railway; East Anglian Railways
- Pre-grouping: Great Eastern Railway
- Post-grouping: London and North Eastern Railway; Eastern Region of British Railways

Key dates
- 11 September 1848: Opened
- 9 September 1968: Closed to passengers
Location

Fransham railway station is a former station in Great Fransham, Norfolk. It was opened as part of the Lynn and Dereham Railway, becoming part of the East Anglian Railways from 1847, on the section of line between Dereham and Swaffham.

== History ==
The Lynn and Dereham Railway was authorised by the Lynn and Dereham Railway Act 1845 (8 & 9 Vict. c. cxxvi) which was given royal assent on 21 July 1845. The railway opened in stages between 1846 and 1848, and later became part of the Great Eastern Railway. Hunt's Directory of East Norfolk 1850 shows Edgar Skeit as a "railway clerk". However, White's History, Gazetteer, and Directory of Norfolk 1854 lists Edgar Skeet as being station master at Great Fransham. He would spend over 30 years in this role.

He was christened on 20 August 1804 at Ubbeston, Suffolk. William White's History, Gazetteer, and Directory of Norfolk 1883 lists him as still being stationmaster despite being 80 years old. He died in September 1888 aged 84 and is buried in the North East corner of Beeston churchyard.

In the early days, four passenger trains and one goods train would pass through the station each way daily giving ten movements. Great Fransham was a halt between the two major junctions of East Dereham and Swaffham. The station also had a level crossing.

The original intention of the company had been to extend their line to Great Yarmouth, via Norwich, but this plan was blocked by the rival Wymondham to Dereham scheme proposed by the Norfolk Railway.

The line was closed to passenger and freight services by the Eastern Region of British Railways after last train on Saturday 7 September 1968.

It was closed as part of the Beeching Axe, despite Beeching's report intending to retain the King's Lynn - Dereham - Norwich line.

Some items of rolling stock are kept at the station, although not on public display. For a while the station was home to an unrestored 1916 Hudswell Clarke 0-6-0ST, works number 1208. This was the last surviving locomotive from the Nidd Valley Light Railway. It has since been purchased and removed for future use on the Embsay and Bolton Abbey Steam Railway.

== Rolling stock ==
=== Passenger vehicles ===
Built for	Number	Type	Designation	Livery	Notes
Great Eastern Railway	1235	Diagram 421	T	Varnished teak	Body only, Static
London Midland and Scottish Railway	42551	Horse box	HBY	-	Body only, Static

Preceding station	Disused railways	Following station
Dunham; Line and station closed	Great Eastern; Lynn and Dereham Railway	Wendling; Line and station closed

== Bibliography ==
- Oppitz, Leslie (Autumn 1989). "East Anglia Railways Remembered". Countryside Books.
