= Great Dunham =

Village in Norfolk, England

Coordinates: 52.697115°N 0.770711°E

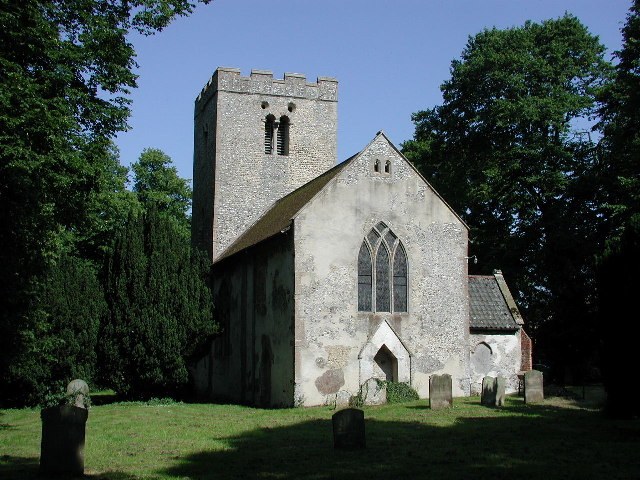
- St Andrew's Church

- Location within Norfolk
- Area: 4.43 sq mi (11.5 km^{2})
- Population: 372 (2021 census)
  - Density: 84/sq mi (32/km^{2})
- OS grid reference: TF8732514650
- District: Breckland
- Shire county: Norfolk
- Region: East
- Country: England
- Sovereign state: United Kingdom
- Post town: King's Lynn
- Postcode district: PE32
- Dialling code: 01760
- Police: Norfolk
- Fire: Norfolk
- Ambulance: East of England
- UK Parliament: South West Norfolk

Great Dunham is a village and civil parish in the English county of Norfolk.

Great Dunham is located 4.8 miles (7.7 km) north-east of Swaffham and 23 miles (37 km) west of Norwich.

== History ==
Great Dunham's name is of Anglo-Saxon origin and derives from the Old English for the larger settlement on the hill.

In the Domesday Book, Great Dunham is listed alongside Little Dunham as a settlement of 76 households in the hundred of South Laundich. In 1086, the village was part of the East Anglian estates of King William I, Ralph de Tosny and Edmund, son of Payne.

In 1756, a smock mill was built in Great Dunham where it stood until it was burned down in an arson attack in 1840. The mill was replaced with a tower mill which fell into dereliction in 1926, today the mill has been restored.

Dunham Railway Station opened in 1848 on the Lynn and Dereham Railway and was finally closed in 1968.

== Geography ==
According to the 2021 census, Great Dunham has a population of 372 people which shows an increase from the 344 people recorded in the 2011 census.

== St Andrew's Church ==
Great Dunham's parish church is dedicated to Saint Andrew and dates from the Fifteenth Century. St Andrew's is located within the village on Litcham Road and has been Grade I listed since 1960. The church holds Sunday services once a month.

St Andrew's features stained-glass depicting Christ, Abraham and Saint Andrew designed by James Powell and Sons as well as a Seventeenth Century pulpit and reading desk.

== Amenities ==
Great Dunham Primary is a local authority school, the headteacher is Mr. M. Cuenca-Farrow.

== Governance ==
Great Dunham is part of the electoral ward of Launditch for local elections and is part of the district of Breckland.

The village's national constituency is Mid Norfolk which has been represented by Conservative's George Freeman MP since 2024.

== War Memorial ==
Great Dunham War Memorial is a stone wheel cross in St Mary's Churchyard, the memorial was unveiled by the Reverend Humphrey Barclay MC. The memorial lists the following names for the First World War:

Rank	Name	Unit	Date of death	Burial/Commemoration
Pte.	John Hunter	9th Bn., Essex Regiment	8 August 1918	Beacon Cemetery
Pte.	William Hudson	10th Bn., Essex Regt.	6 November 1917	Duhallow ADS Cemetery
Pte.	William F. Yull	10th Bn., Essex Regt.	29 April 1917	St Andrew's Churchyard
Pte.	Oliver E. Smith	18th Bn., Highland Light Infantry	8 November 1918	Kezelburg Cemetery
Pte.	Charles W. Hey	1/5th Bn., Norfolk Regiment	12 August 1915	Helles Memorial
Pte.	Edward Mason	1/5th Bn., Norfolk Regt.	3 November 1917	Deir al-Balah Cemetery
Pte.	Roland W. W. Reed	1/5th Bn., Norfolk Regt.	12 August 1915	Helles Memorial
Pte.	Arthur Jaggs	7th Bn., Norfolk Regt.	14 October 1917	Arras Memorial
Pte.	Robert J. Warnes	8th Bn., Norfolk Regt.	19 July 1916	Bray Military Cemetery
Pte.	Arthur Hey	8th Bn., Queen's Royal Regiment	7 September 1916	Heilly Station Cemetery
Pte.	Fredrick G. Cornwell	1/8th Bn., Royal Warwickshire Regt.	27 August 1917	Tyne Cot

The following name was added after the Second World War:

Rank	Name	Unit	Date of death	Burial/Commemoration
Dvr.	Rowland J. Claxton	Royal Army Service Corps	21 September 1944	Sint-Oedenrode RC Churchyard
