= St Germain's railway station =

Former railway station in Norfolk, England

Coordinates: 52.6979°N 0.3910°E

St Germain's
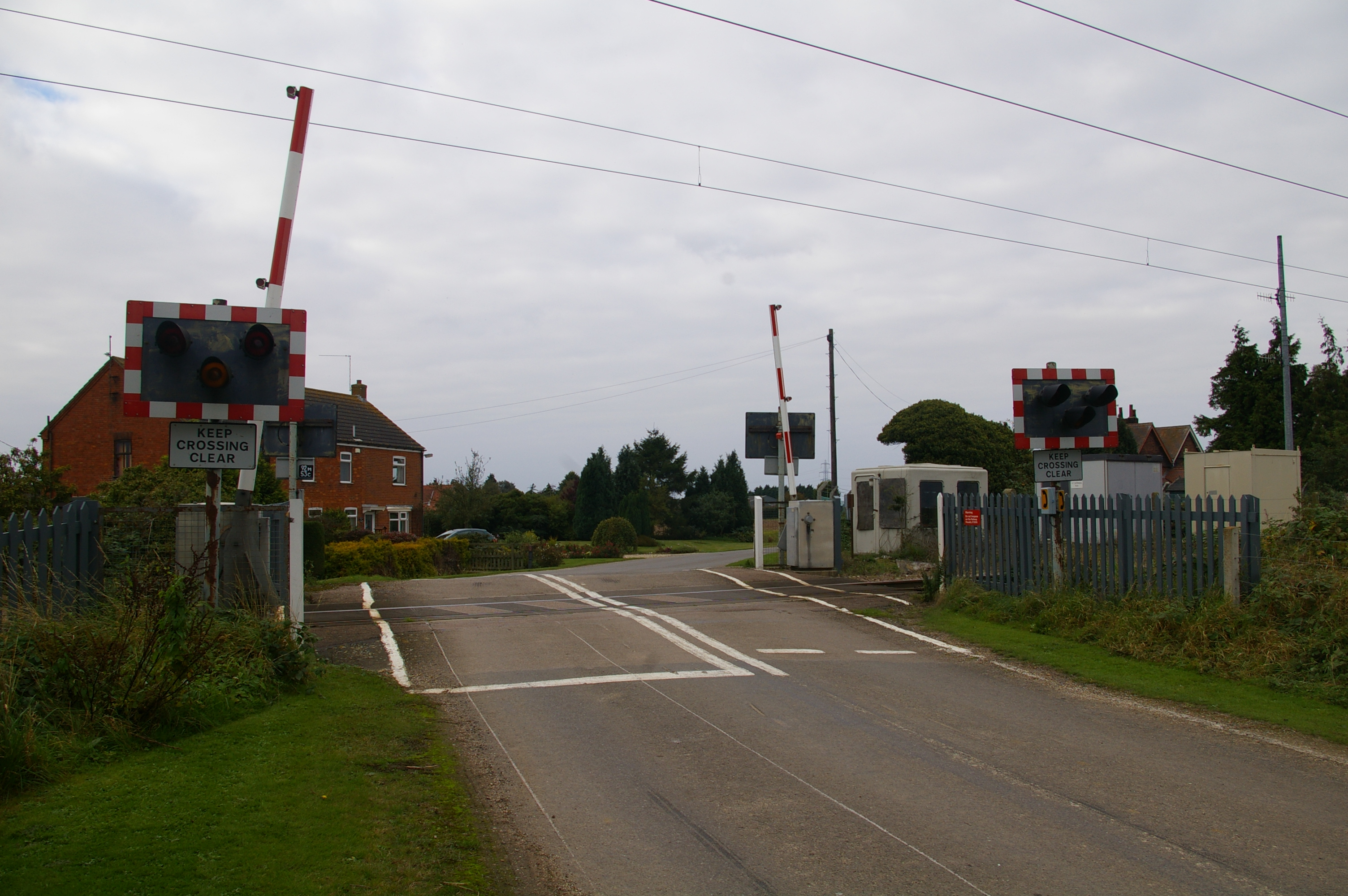
- Level crossing very close to the site of St Germain's station.

General information
- Location: Wiggenhall St. Germans, Norfolk; England
- Grid reference: TF616138

Other information
- Status: Disused

History
- Original company: Lynn and Ely Railway

Key dates
- 27 Oct 1846: Opened
- Oct 1850: Closed
Location

St. Germain's railway station was located on the line between Kings Lynn and Watlington. It served the parish of Wiggenhall St. Germans, and closed in 1850.

== History ==
The bill for the Lynn and Ely Railway (L&ER) received royal assent on 30 June 1845 as the Lynn and Ely Railway Act 1845 (8 & 9 Vict. c. lv). Work started on the line in 1846.

The first section of the L&ER opened on 27 October 1846 between Lynn and Downham, and included a station at St Germain's. St Germain's station opened with the line and was situated between Watlington station and King's Lynn. It did not last long, being closed in October 1850, by which time the L&ER had amalgamated with other railways to form the East Anglian Railways.

== Routes ==
Preceding station	Historical railways	Following station
Watlington; Line and station open	East Anglian Railways; Lynn and Ely Railway	Lynn; Line and station open
