= Narborough and Pentney railway station =

Former railway station in England

Coordinates: 52.6899°N 0.5758°E

Narborough and Pentney
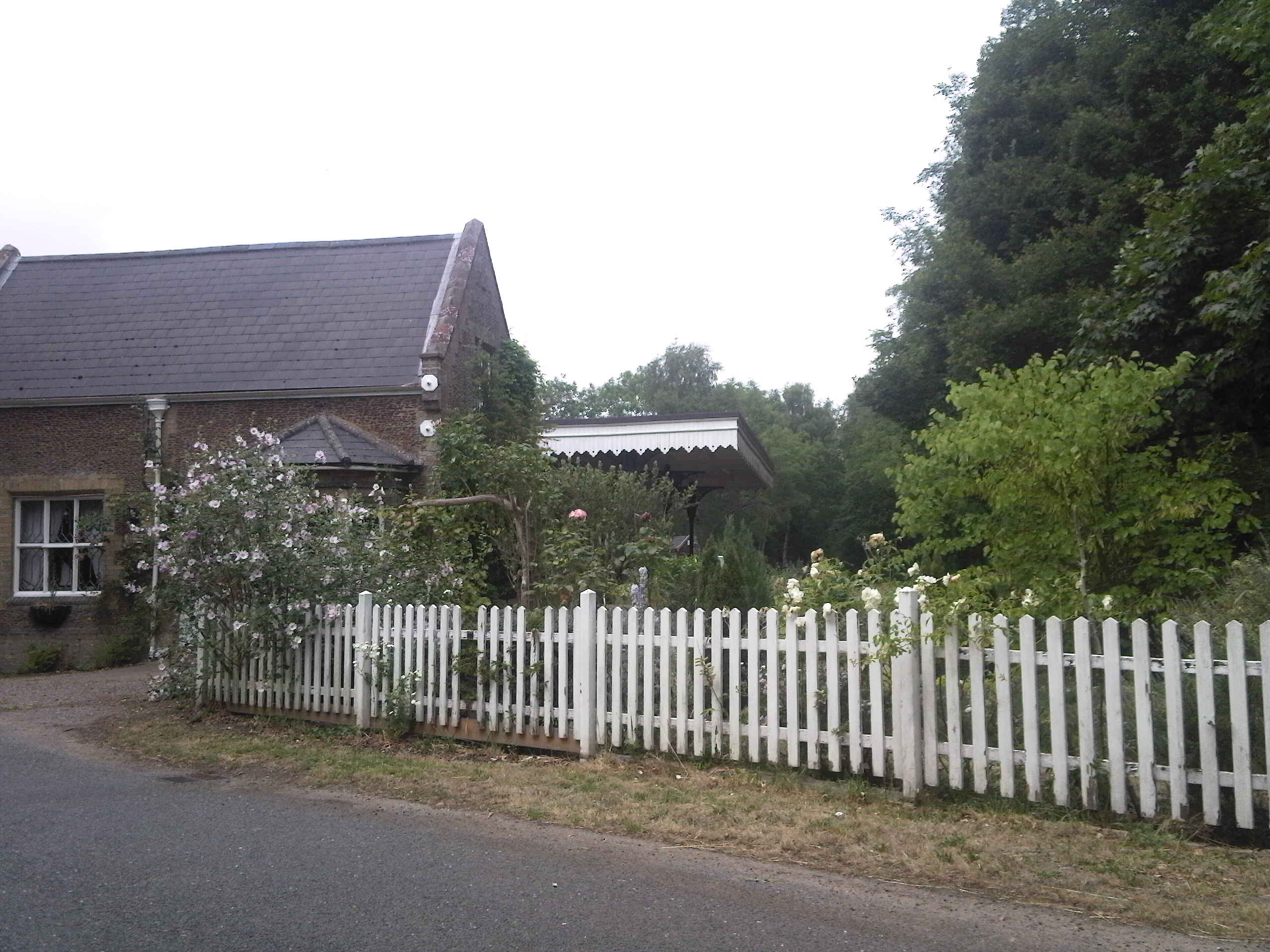

General information
- Location: Narborough, Norfolk; England
- Platforms: 2

Other information
- Status: Disused

History
- Pre-grouping: Great Eastern Railway
- Post-grouping: London and North Eastern Railway; Eastern Region of British Railways

Key dates
- 27 October 1846: Opened as Narborough
- 1 July 1923: Renamed; Narborough and Pentney
- 9 September 1968: Closed to passengers
Location

Narborough and Pentney station was in Norfolk, serving the villages of Narborough and Pentney.

== History ==
It was on the line between King's Lynn and Swaffham opening with the line on 27 October 1846 and temporarily the terminus of the branch from Lynn. Nine months after Narborough station opened, its owner, the Lynn & Dereham Railway, was taken over by the East Anglian Railways (EAR). The line to Swaffham was opened 19 days after the EAR took over, on 10 August 1847. It was closed in 1968.

Preceding station	Disused railways	Following station
Bilney; Line and station closed	Great Eastern Railway; Lynn and Dereham Railway	Swaffham; Line and station closed
