= Scarning railway station =

Former railway station in England

Coordinates: 52.6764°N 0.8936°E

Scarning

General information
- Location: Scarning, Norfolk; England
- Grid reference: TF957126

Other information
- Status: Disused

History
- Original company: East Anglian Railways

Key dates
- 11 Oct 1848: Opened
- Oct 1850: Closed
Location

Scarning railway station was located on the line between Wendling and Dereham. It served the parish of Scarning, and closed in 1850.

Preceding station	Disused railways	Following station
Wendling; Line and station closed	Great Eastern Railway; Lynn and Dereham Railway	Dereham; Line closed, station open
