= Swaffham railway station =

Former railway station in England

Coordinates: 52.6522°N 0.6868°E

Swaffham
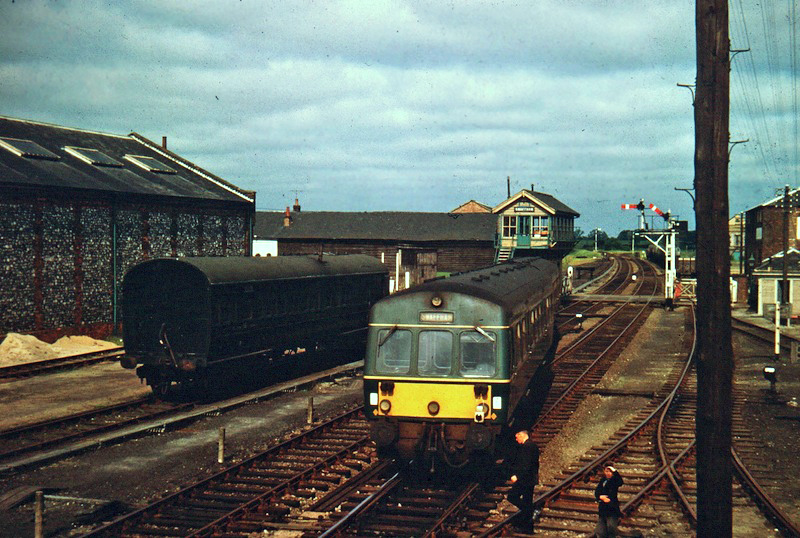
- Swaffham station in June 1963

General information
- Location: Swaffham, Breckland; England
- Grid reference: TF818094
- Platforms: 2

Other information
- Status: Disused

History
- Original company: Lynn and Dereham Railway; East Anglian Railways
- Pre-grouping: Great Eastern Railway
- Post-grouping: London and North Eastern Railway; Eastern Region of British Railways

Key dates
- 10 Aug 1847: Opened
- 1966: Closed to freight
- 9 Sep 1968: Closed to passengers
Location

Swaffham railway station was located in Swaffham, Norfolk. It was the junction for lines to King's Lynn, Dereham, and Thetford. The Thetford branch closed on 15 June 1964, and the station closed to passengers on 9 September 1968.

Preceding station	Disused railways	Following station
Narborough and Pentney; Line and station closed	Great Eastern Railway; Lynn and Dereham Railway	Sporle; Line and station closed
Terminus	Great Eastern Railway; Bury and Thetford (Swaffham Branch)	Holme Hale; Line and station closed
