= Scarning =

Village in Norfolk, England

Coordinates: 52.67233°N 0.8894°E

- Village
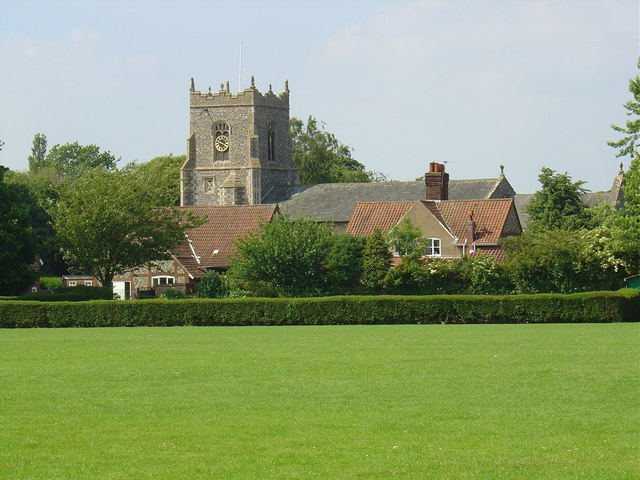
- St Peter and St Paul Church

- Location within Norfolk
- Area: 14.13 km^{2} (5.46 sq mi)
- Population: 2,906 (2011)
  - Density: 206/km^{2} (530/sq mi)
- OS grid reference: TF954122
  - London: c. 100 miles (161 km)
- Civil parish: Scarning
- District: Breckland
- Shire county: Norfolk
- Region: East
- Country: England
- Sovereign state: United Kingdom
- Post town: DEREHAM
- Postcode district: NR19
- Dialling code: 01362
- Police: Norfolk
- Fire: Norfolk
- Ambulance: East of England
- UK Parliament: Mid Norfolk

Scarning is a village and civil parish in the Breckland district of Norfolk, England. It covers an area of 14.12 km^{2} (5.45 sq mi) and had a population of 2,932 in 1,092 households at the 2001 census, reducing to 2,906 in the same number of households in the 2011 census. It lies 2 miles (3.2 km) west of Dereham and 17 miles (27 km) west of Norwich, on the old turnpike road between Dereham and Swaffham.

== Structure and history ==
The name of the village means "dung place", perhaps originally the name of a nearby stream.

Scarning divides into Old Scarning and New Scarning. Old Scarning is the original village, which has existed for over 900 years. New Scarning, an estate built in the 1990s, consists of a web of lanes named after species of flowers. Older names and spellings for the village include Scerninga in the Domesday Book of 1086, Scerninges in 1199, and Skerning in 1253.

Scarning Parish Council has nine members.

== Church ==
The Parish Church of St Peter and St Paul has occupied its prominent position since the 12th century. It is known to have had a rector since 1299. The whole building, mainly in the Perpendicular style, was extensively restored in 1869, when the gable of the chancel roof was raised to its original pitch for £1000. In 1894 the tower was restored, the nave buttresses were rebuilt, and new churchyard gates were fitted – all at the expense of Dr Augustus Jessopp.

The single gate was replaced in the 1950s by Scarning Mothers' Union and refurbished in 2007 in memory of Fred and Lilian Hoskins. The churchyard was levelled and re-seeded in 1970. Scarning Parish Council contributes to its upkeep. The church and vestry were given a new roof in 1979 and the double gates replaced in the 1980s. Care of the building continues. Recent improvements include a PA system with loop induction and a ramp to help with access. Switch gear and heating were replaced in 2007 with the help of a grant from National Lottery Awards for All.

== Primary school ==
In 1604 a local farmer William Seckar left his house and land to his wife Alice for so long as she should survive, but stipulated that on her death the income from the estate should be used for "maintenance of one free school, to be kept for ever in the said house, while the world endure, in Scarning."

After William's death on 1 November 1604, Alice married again on 3 December 1604, but he too died on 6 December 1608, and she married a third time on 7 January 1609. This husband survived until 1622. She died in 1638, but there were delays and litigation over the construction of the school. It eventually opened in 1645.

By 1700 the schoolmaster was teaching the sons of the yeomen and farmers, many of whom boarded at the school. These boys were kept separate from the sons of labourers, to whom the usher taught reading, writing and arithmetic during the day. In the evening the usher looked after the master's boarders, who came from all parts of Norfolk and Suffolk. Among them were the grandsons of Roger North of Rougham, one of whom set the schoolhouse on fire twice. Another trying pupil was Edward Thurlow, 1st Baron Thurlow, who engaged in the sport of cock throwing, and developed a lifelong dislike for the master, Rev. Joseph Brett, refusing to acknowledge that he knew him.

The master of the school and incumbent of the church in 1761–1789 was Rev. Robert Potter, who became a prebendary of Norwich Cathedral in 1788. He spent much of his time at Scarning pamphleteering and translating Greek drama. Among the school's pupils under Potter was Jacob Mountain (1749–1825), the first Anglican Bishop of Quebec.

By 1800, the schoolmaster, Mr Priest, had attracted a large number of day boys to the school, as there was no room for them to board. They came to school on dickies (donkeys), which were turned out for the day onto Podmoor. Mischievous village boys took delight in driving the dickies a mile or two to Daffy Green, so that the young gentlemen had to chase and catch them before they could ride home.

== Village hall ==
Scarning Village Hall has served as a main meeting place in the village since it opened in 1902. It was recently upgraded and extended to serve the needs of a growing village. The main hall has an open gallery that seats eighty to eat in comfort. There is a smaller meeting room off the main hall. The substantial grounds to the hall lead through to a playing field on the north side of it.

== Transport ==
Scarning railway station opened on the line between Wendling and Dereham on 11 September 1848, but it does not appear in Bradshaw's Guide timetables until March 1849. It features in Topham's timetable in October 1848 as Scurning, but last appears in Bradshaw's in October 1850, the year it closed after a short operating life.

Bus services are detailed on the bustimes.org site.

== Notable people ==
- Alderman Richard Young JP DL. Sheriff of London and Middlesex in 1871, was born and educated in Scarning.
