= Wendling railway station =

Former railway station in England

Coordinates: 52.6807°N 0.8563°E

Wendling
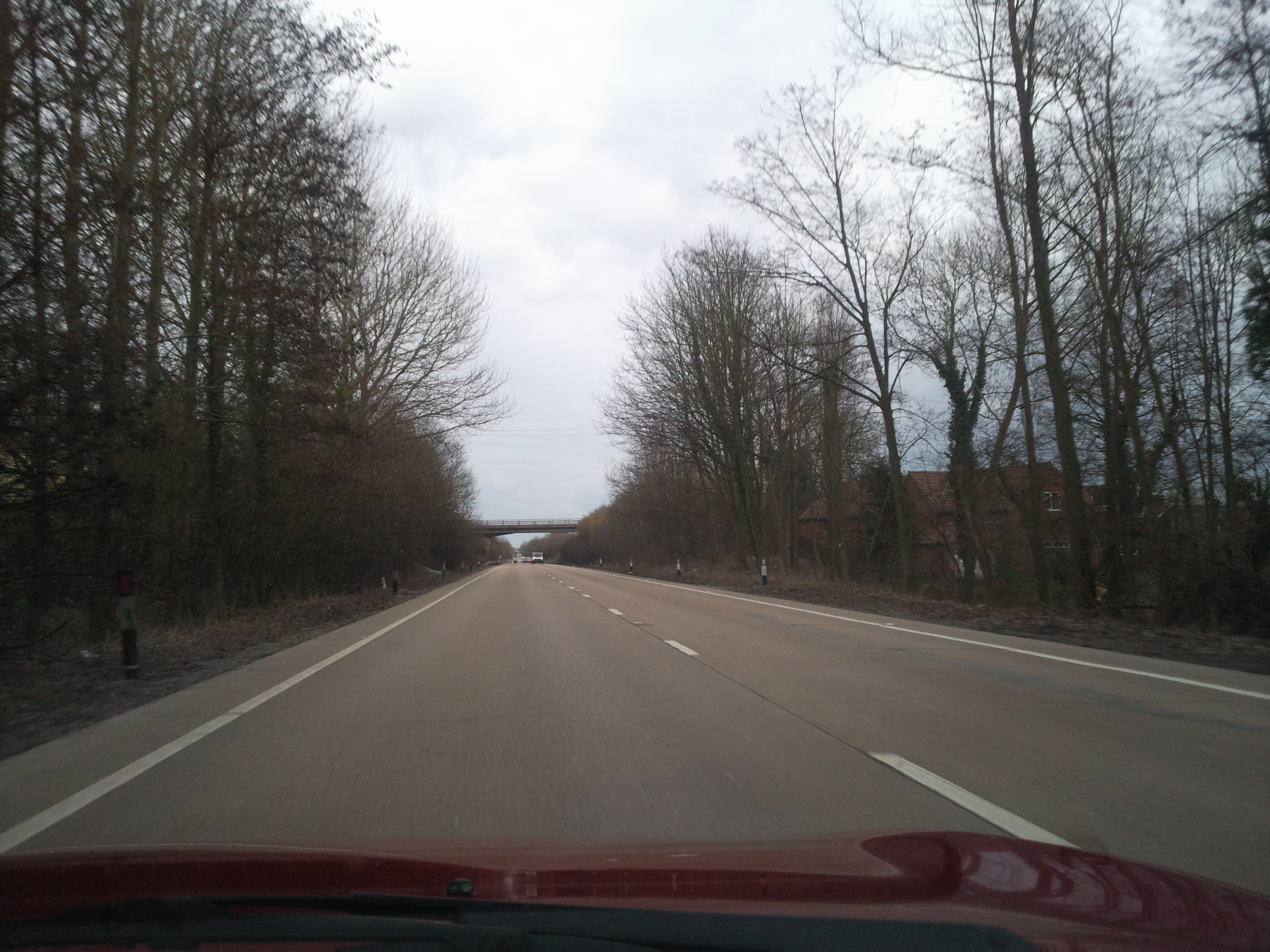
- Site of Wendling railway station -now A47

General information
- Location: Wendling, Norfolk; England
- Platforms: 2

Other information
- Status: Disused

History
- Original company: Lynn and Dereham Railway; East Anglian Railways
- Pre-grouping: Great Eastern Railway
- Post-grouping: London and North Eastern Railway; Eastern Region of British Railways

Key dates
- 11 Sep 1848: Opened
- 13 July 1964: closed for freight
- 9 Sep 1968: Closed to passengers
Location

Wendling railway station was a railway station in Wendling, Norfolk on the Great Eastern line between Dereham and King's Lynn. It closed in 1968.

This section of the former railway has been used for improvements to the A47, with the site of the station being lost under the roadworks.

The station featured in the Dad's Army episodes Battle School and The Day the Balloon Went Up.

Preceding station	Disused railways	Following station
Fransham; Line and station closed	Great Eastern; Lynn and Dereham Railway	Scarning; Line and station closed
