= Dunham railway station =

Former railway station in England

Coordinates: 52.6849°N 0.7620°E

Dunham
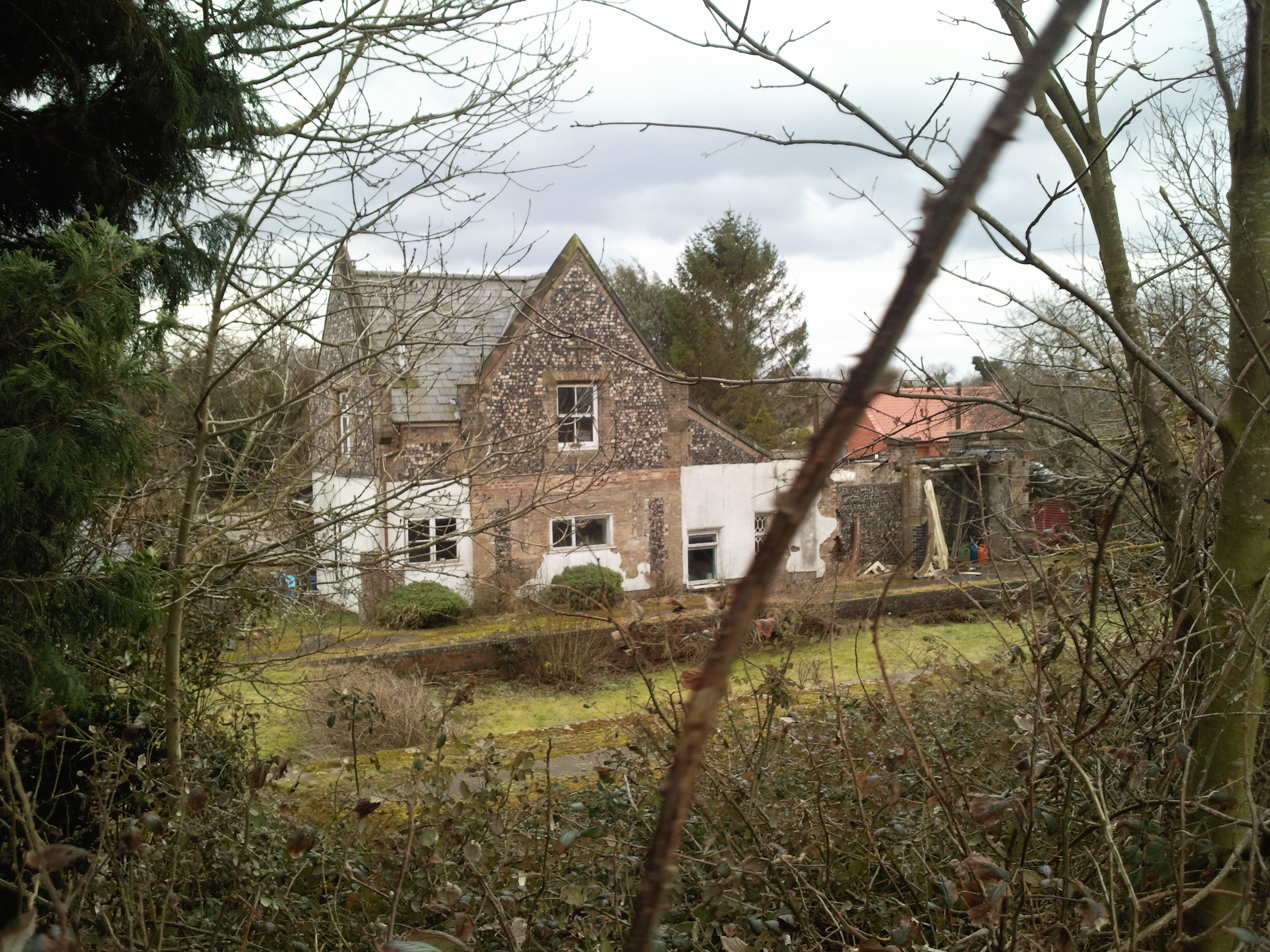

General information
- Location: Little Dunham, Breckland; England
- Platforms: 2

Other information
- Status: Disused

History
- Original company: Lynn and Dereham Railway; East Anglian Railways
- Pre-grouping: Great Eastern Railway
- Post-grouping: London and North Eastern Railway; Eastern Region of British Railways

Key dates
- 11 September 1848: Opened as Little Dunham
- September 1851: Renamed Dunham
- 9 September 1968: Closed
Location

Dunham railway station was located in Little Dunham, Norfolk on the Great Eastern Railway line between Swaffham and Dereham. It closed to passengers on 9 September 1968 as a result of the Beeching Axe, with the last trains running on Saturday 7 September.

Preceding station	Disused railways	Following station
Sporle; Line and station closed	Great Eastern Railway; Lynn and Dereham Railway	Fransham; Line and station closed
