= Frankham =

Frankham is a surname. Notable people with the surname include:

- David Frankham (born 1926), English film and television actor
- Harold Frankham (1911–1996), English Anglican priest
- Johnny Frankham (born 1948), English boxer
- Richard Frankham (born 1942), Australian biologist, author, and academic

== See also ==
- Fransham (disambiguation)
