= East Winch railway station =

Former railway station in England

Coordinates: 52.7234°N 0.5161°E

East Winch
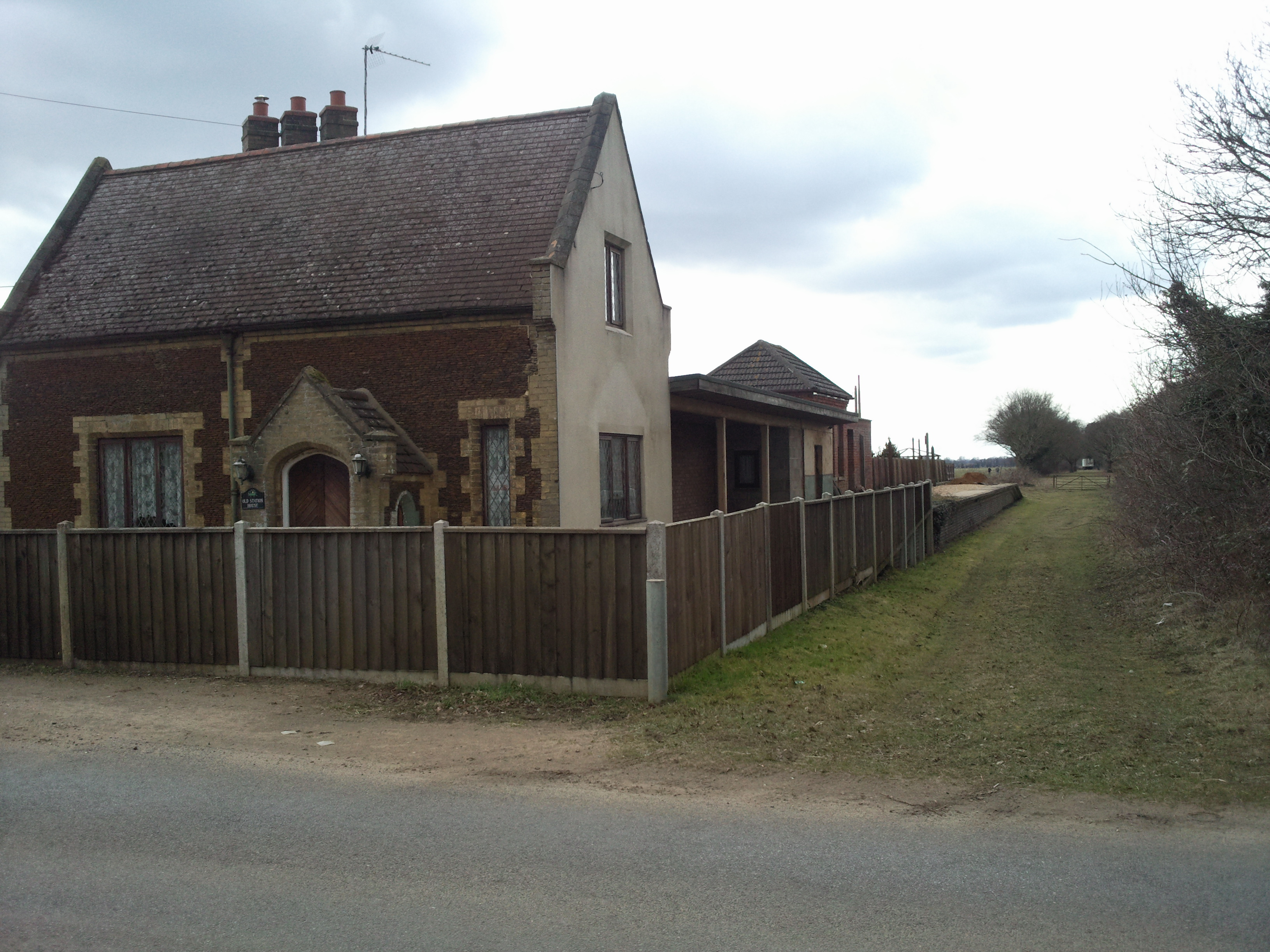
- Former East Winch station

General information
- Location: East Winch, Norfolk; England
- Platforms: 2

Other information
- Status: Disused

History
- Pre-grouping: Great Eastern Railway
- Post-grouping: London and North Eastern Railway; Eastern Region of British Railways

Key dates
- 27 October 1846: Opened
- 7 September 1968: Closed to passengers
Location

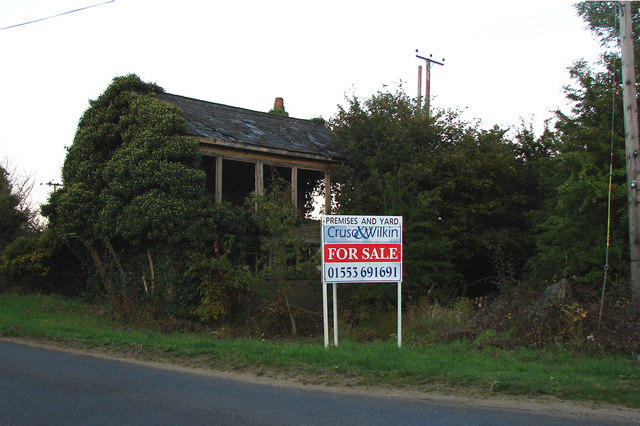
Derelict station signal box

East Winch railway station was at East Winch, Norfolk, England on the line between King's Lynn and Swaffham. It closed in 1968 with the last trains running on 7 September that year.

The signal box from the station lay derelict until it was later salvaged by the Mid-Norfolk Railway for use at Thuxton level crossing where it has since been restored and in working use from 2010 onwards.

== History ==
The Lynn and Dereham Railway Act 1845 (8 & 9 Vict. c. cxxvi) received royal assent on 21 July 1845. The line and its stations were opened on 27 October 1846 as far as Narborough. While the line was still being built the Lynn and Dereham Railway was taken over by the East Anglian Railways on 22 July 1847. 19 days later the line reached Swaffham.

Preceding station	Disused railways	Following station
Middleton Towers; Line and station closed	Great Eastern Railway; Lynn and Dereham Railway	Bilney; Line and station closed
