= Middleton Towers railway station =

Former railway station in England

Coordinates: 52.7336°N 0.4715°E

Middleton Towers
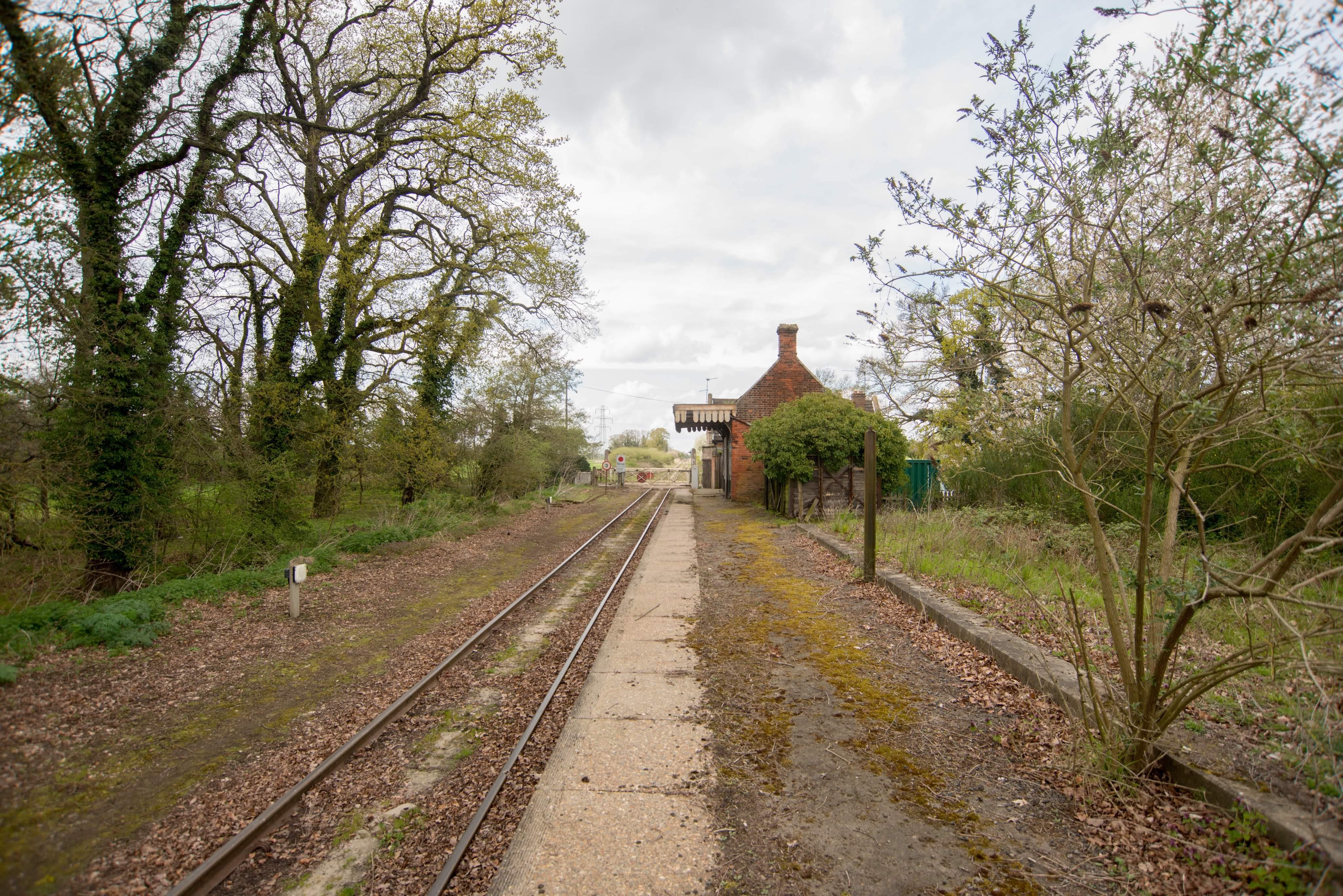
- View of the platform buildings at Middleton Towers railway station, April 2023.

General information
- Location: Leziate, Norfolk; England
- Platforms: 1

Other information
- Status: Disused

History
- Pre-grouping: Great Eastern Railway
- Post-grouping: London and North Eastern Railway; Eastern Region of British Railways

Key dates
- 27 October 1846: Opened
- 1968: Closed to passengers
Location

Middleton Towers railway station is a disused station in Leziate, Norfolk. It is on the line between Swaffham and King's Lynn, and closed along with the rest of the line in 1968.

== History ==
The Lynn and Dereham Railway Act 1845 (8 & 9 Vict. c. lv) received royal assent on 21 July 1845. The line and its railway stations were opened on 27 October 1846 as far as Narborough. Middleton railway station opened with the line and was situated south-east of Lynn station and north-west of East Winch. While the line was still being built the Lynn and Dereham Railway was taken over by the East Anglian Railways on 22 July 1847. The line reached Swaffham on 10 August 1847. The station was renamed from Middleton to Middleton Towers on 1 November 1924.

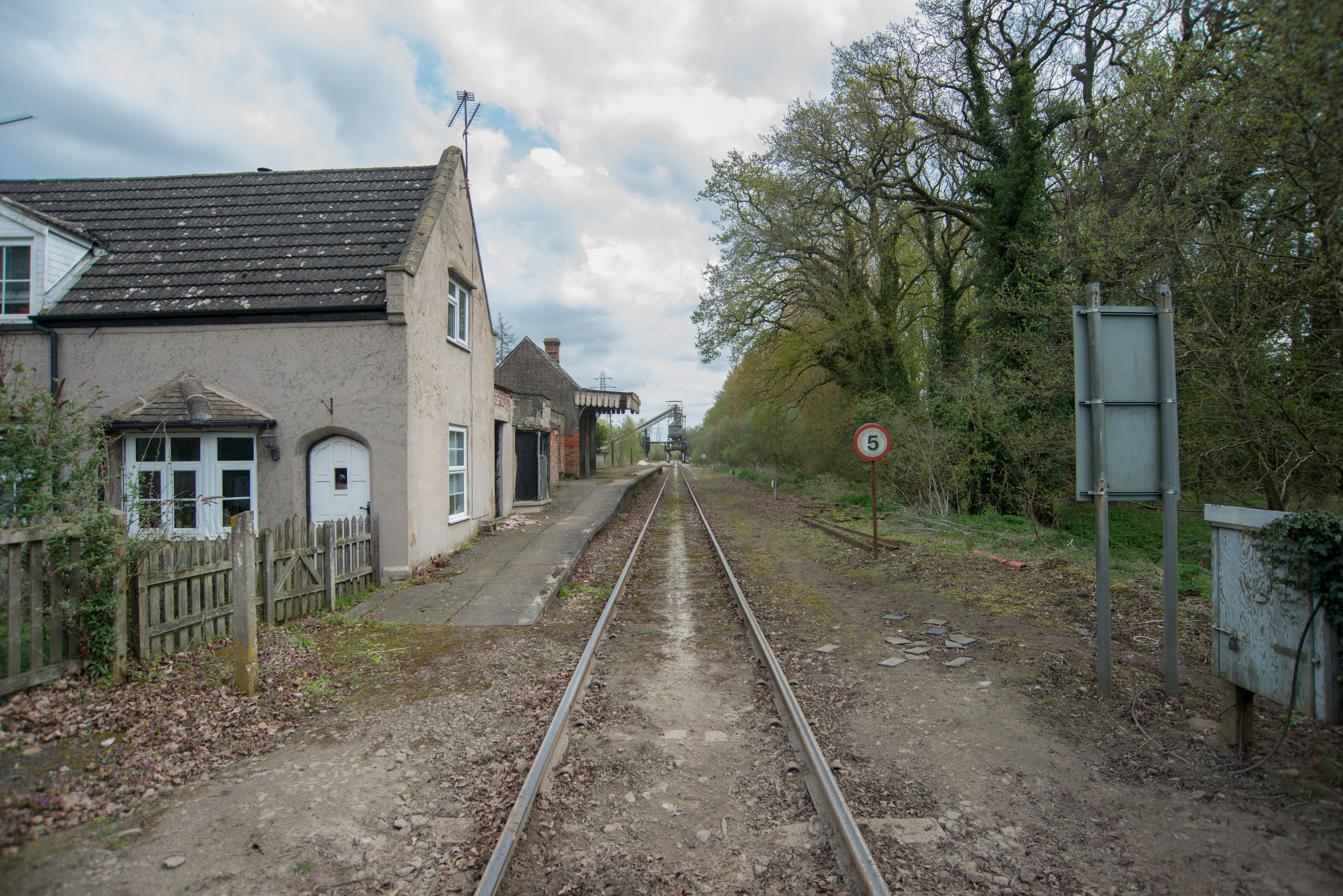
View of the station, facing the former line towards Dereham, April 2023.

After a large housing development was completed in Leziate in 1990, the line between Middleton Towers and King's Lynn was considered for restoration as a passenger route. With the electrification of the main line between Cambridge and King's Lynn the provision of rolling stock was a major issue.

The railway between the station and King's Lynn remains in use as a goods line, and the station has been the destination of a number of charter trains. A sand loading silo has been constructed on the former main line to Swaffham east of the station.

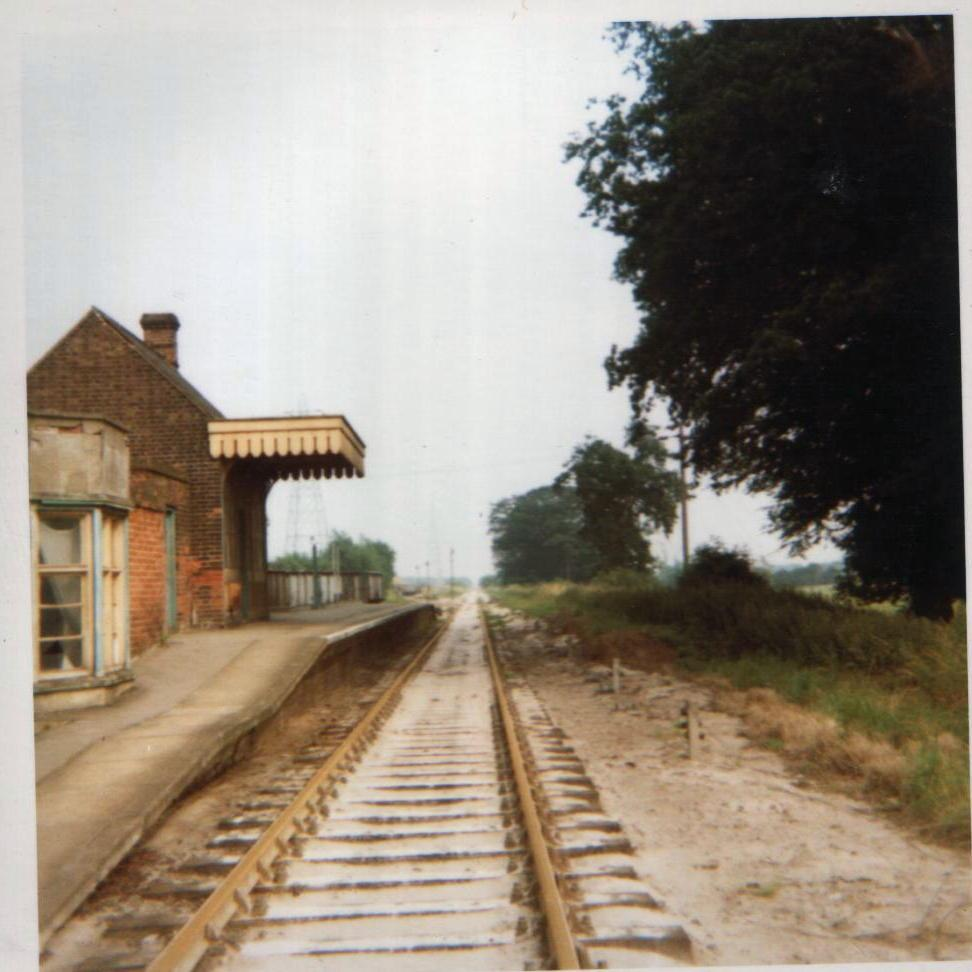
Middleton Towers railway station in 1972, four years after closure.

A railway heritage organisation, the Middleton Towers Restoration Group was founded in 2021 by Alex Brammer and he is working with the site owner Network Rail to restore the derelict platform buildings. The eventual aim to convert the platform buildings into a community venture, likely a tea room and heritage railway museum recognising the history of the line.

Preceding station	Disused railways	Following station
King's Lynn; Line open, station open No scheduled passenger service.	Great Eastern Railway; Lynn and Dereham Railway	East Winch; Line and station closed
