= West Bilney =

Village in Norfolk, England

Coordinates: 52.708401°N 0.53871420°E

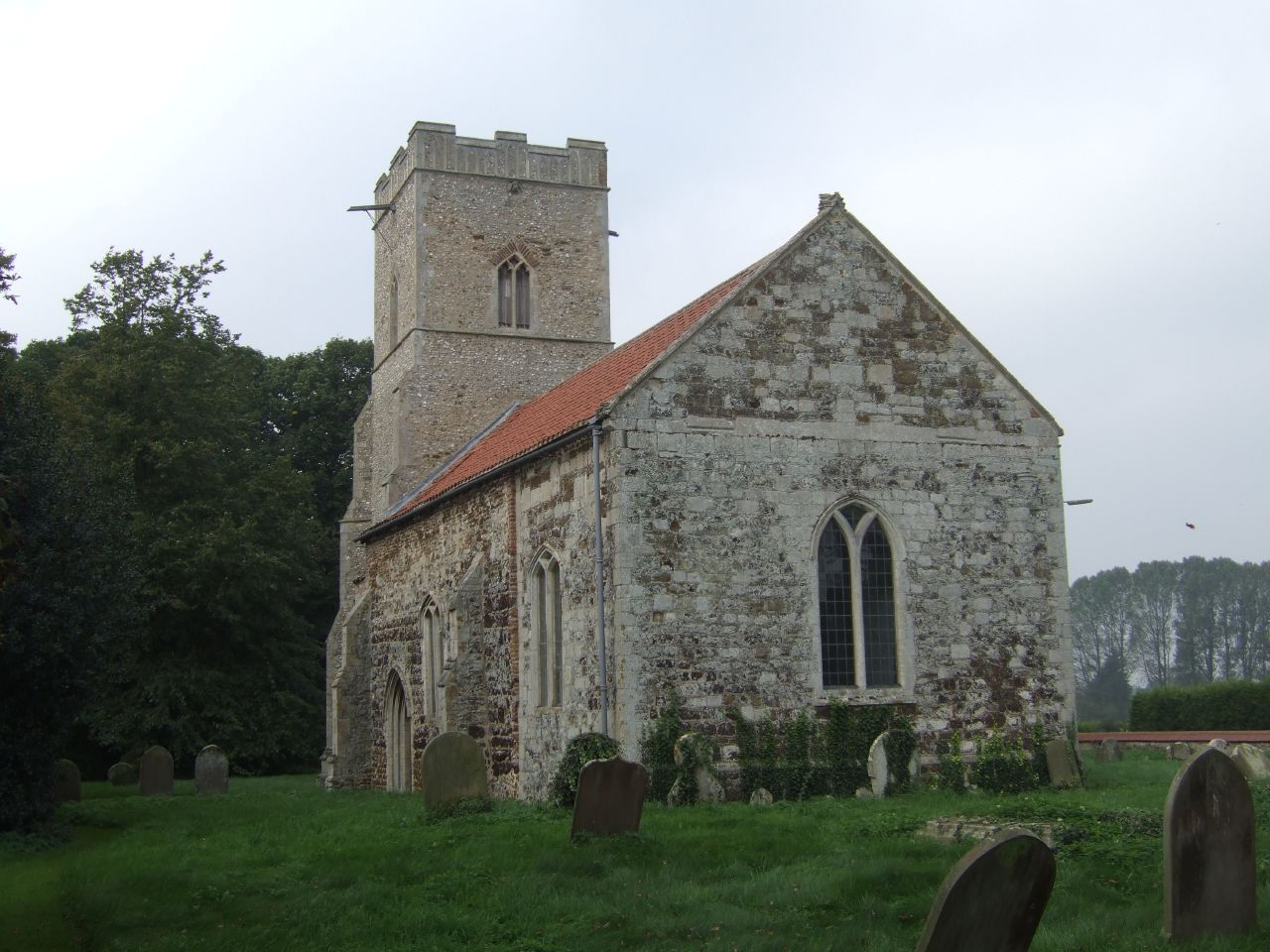
- St Cecilia’s Church, West Bilney (now redundant)

- Location within Norfolk
- Civil parish: East Winch
- District: King's Lynn and West Norfolk
- Shire county: Norfolk
- Region: East
- Country: England
- Sovereign state: United Kingdom
- Post town: KING'S LYNN
- Postcode district: PE32
- Dialling code: 01553
- Police: Norfolk
- Fire: Norfolk
- Ambulance: East of England
- UK Parliament: North West Norfolk

West Bilney is a village and former civil parish on the A47 road, 32 miles (51 km) west of Norwich, now in the parish of East Winch, in the King's Lynn and West Norfolk district, in the county of Norfolk, England. In 1931 the parish had a population of 188. Its church is dedicated to St Cecilia.

== History ==
The name "Bilney" probably means 'Bil(l)a's island'. West Bilney was recorded in the Domesday Book of 1086 as variously Benelai/Bilenei/Binelai. On 1 April 1935 the parish was abolished and merged with East Winch.

== Notable residents ==
Actor Stephen Fry owns a home in the village.

== See also ==
- Bilney railway station
