= Great Fransham =

Village in Norfolk, England

Coordinates: 52.683°N 0.805°E

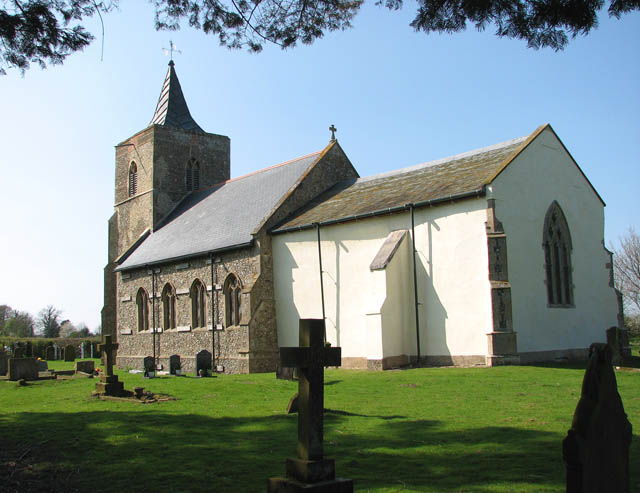
- All Saints Church, Great Fransham

- Location within Norfolk
- Civil parish: Fransham
- District: Breckland
- Shire county: Norfolk
- Region: East
- Country: England
- Sovereign state: United Kingdom
- Post town: Dereham
- Postcode district: NR19

Great Fransham is a village in the civil parish of Fransham, in the Breckland district, in the English county of Norfolk

Great Fransham is located 5.9 miles (9.5 km) west of Dereham and 21 miles (34 km) west of Norwich.

== History ==
Great Fransham's name is of Anglo-Saxon origin and derives from the Old English for the larger Fram's homestead or village.

In the Domesday Book, Great and Little Fransham are listed together as a settlement of 56 households in the hundred of Laundich. In 1086, the village was part of the East Anglian estates of William de Warenne and Ralph de Tosney.

Hyde Hall in Great Fransham was built in the Eighteenth Century and has staircases that have been designated of national importance.

Fransham Railway Station opened in 1848 as part of the Lynn and Dereham Railway. The station closed in 1968 as part of the Beeching Cuts.

On 1 April 1935 the parish was abolished and merged to form Fransham.

== Geography ==
In 1931 the parish had a population of 222, this was the last time separate population statistics were collected for Great Fransham as in 1935 the parish was abolished.

== All Saints' Church ==
Great Fransham's church dates from the Thirteenth Century, is located on Station Road and has been Grade II* listed since 1960. All Saints' remains open for Sunday services once a month.

The interior of All Saints' is mostly simple in design except for a Fifteenth Century font and some well preserved brass memorials of Sir Geoffrey de Fransham (1415) and Cecily Legge (1500).

== Governance ==
Fransham is part of the electoral ward of Launditch for local elections and is part of the district of Breckland.

The village's national constituency is South West Norfolk which has been represented by Labour's Terry Jermy MP since 2024.

== War Memorial ==
Great Fransham's war memorial are a set of metal plaques in All Saints' Church which list the following names for the First World War:

| Rank | Name | Unit | Date of death | Burial/Commemoration |
|---|---|---|---|---|
| 2Lt. | Bertie E. Abbs | 7th Bn., Suffolk Regiment | 26 Mar. 1918 | Pozières Memorial |
| Pte. | W. George Lincoln | 641st MT Coy., Army Service Corps | 2 Jul. 1918 | Ribemont Cemetery |
| Pte. | Frederick W. Moore | 2nd Bn., Norfolk Regiment | 3 May 1916 | Kirkee War Cemetery |
| Pte. | C. Arthur Prior | 7th Bn., Norfolk Regt. | 20 Sep. 1917 | Duisans Cemetery |
| Pte. | Cecil B. Martin | 9th Bn., Norfolk Regt. | 24 Mar. 1918 | Lagnicourt Hedge Cemetery |
| Pte. | Richard Webb | 9th Bn., Norfolk Regt. | 15 Sep. 1916 | Thiepval Memorial |
| Pte. | Walter J. Burton | 3/4th Bn., Queen's Royal Regiment | 4 Oct. 1917 | Tyne Cot |

The following names were added after the Second World War:

| Rank | Name | Unit | Date of death | Burial/Commemoration |
|---|---|---|---|---|
| Cpl. | James J. O'Hare | Army Catering Corps | 1 Apr. 1944 | All Saints' Churchyard |
| Gnr. | Robert A. Syer | 65 AT Regt., Royal Artillery | 14 Dec. 1941 | Knightsbridge War Cemetery |
| Gnr. | Ernest E. Woodgate | 72 Field Regt., R.A. | 31 May 1942 | Alamein Memorial |
