= King's Lynn railway station =

Railway station in Norfolk, England

King's Lynn
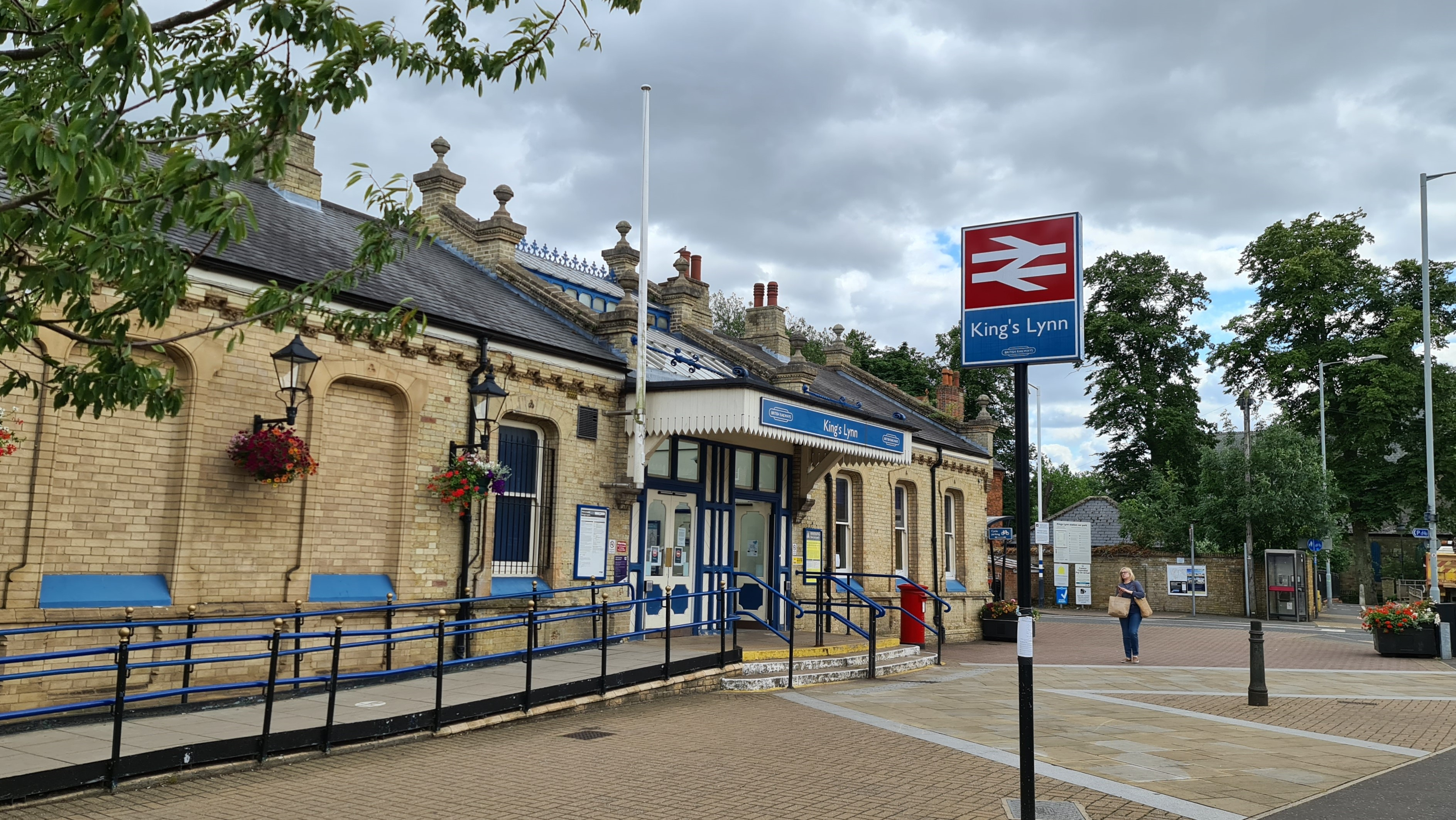
- The station building in 2021.

General information
- Location: King's Lynn, King's Lynn and West Norfolk; England
- Coordinates: 52.7538°N 0.4032°E
- Grid reference: TF623200
- Owner: Network Rail
- Manager: Great Northern
- Platforms: 3 (2 in use)

Other information
- Station code: KLN
- Classification: DfT category D

Key dates
- 27 October 1846: Opened as Lynn
- 1846–1848: Dereham line opens
- 1862: Hunstanton line opens
- 1865: South Lynn station opens
- 1871: Current station built
- 1 January 1911: Renamed King's Lynn
- 1959: South Lynn station and M&GN closes
- 1968: Dereham branch closes, services to Wisbech end
- 1969: Hunstanton branch closes
- 1992: Line electrified, station refurbished

Passengers
- 2020–21: ▼0.240 million
- Interchange: ▼23
- 2021–22: ▲0.684 million
- Interchange: ▲349
- 2022–23: ▲0.757 million
- Interchange: ▲747
- 2023–24: ▲0.789 million
- Interchange: ▼142
- 2024–25: ▲0.853 million
- Interchange: ▲410

Listed Building – Grade II
- Feature: Kings Lynn Railway Station
- Designated: 24 August 2001
- Reference no.: 1389399
Location
Notes
- Passenger statistics from the Office of Rail and Road

King's Lynn railway station is the northern terminus of the Fen line in the east of England, serving the town of King's Lynn, Norfolk. It is 41 miles 47 chains (66.9 km) from Cambridge and 96 miles 75 chains (156.0 km) measured from London Liverpool Street. The station and all trains calling here are operated by Great Northern.

It has been the only station in the town since the closure of South Lynn railway station in 1959.

== History ==
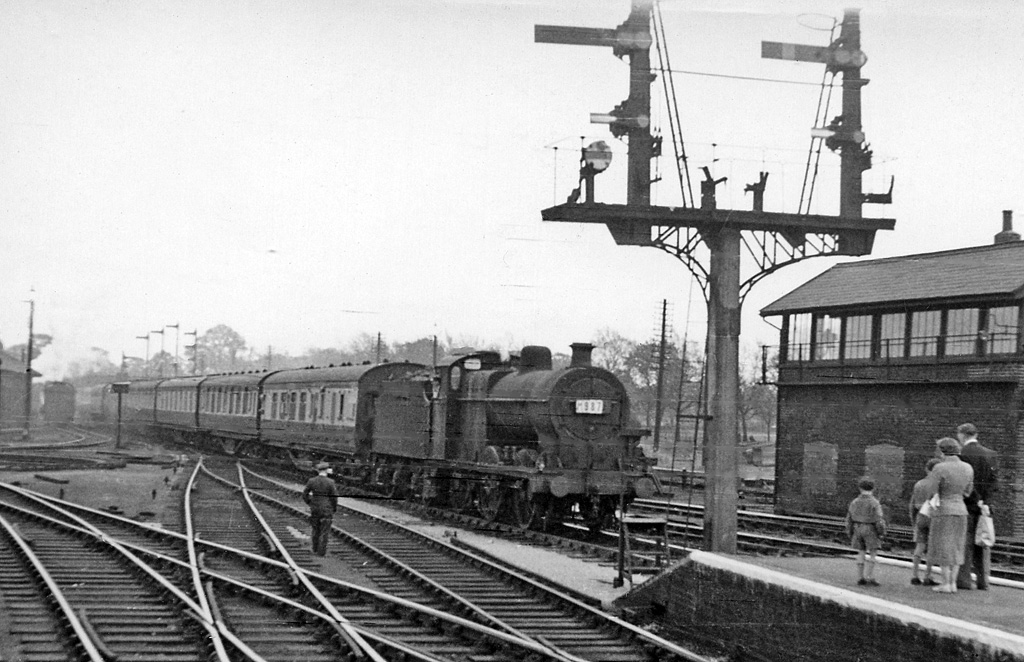
A train arriving at the station in 1956

Lynn and Ely Railway Act 1845
- Act of Parliament
- Parliament of the United Kingdom
- Long title: An Act for making a Railway from Lynn to Ely, with Branches therefrom.
- Citation: 8 & 9 Vict. c. lv

Dates
- Royal assent: 30 June 1845

Lynn and Ely Railway (Deviation and Lynn Dock) Act 1847
- Act of Parliament
- Parliament of the United Kingdom
- Long title: An Act for making a Deviation in the Line of the Lynn and Ely Railway, and for forming Docks within the Borough of King's Lynn.
- Citation: 10 & 11 Vict. c. clxx

Dates
- Royal assent: 9 July 1847
Other legislation
Repealed by	Great Eastern Railway Act 1862

Status: Repealed

Text of statute as originally enacted

Lynn and Ely Railway (Lynn and Wormegay Navigation) Act 1847
- Act of Parliament
- Parliament of the United Kingdom
- Long title: An Act to enable the Lynn and Ely Railway Company to make a Navigation from Lynn to Wormegay, all in the County of Norfolk.
- Citation: 10 & 11 Vict. c. clxxi

Dates
- Royal assent: 9 July 1847
Other legislation
Repealed by	Great Eastern Railway Act 1862

Status: Repealed

Text of statute as originally enacted

The act of Parliament for the Lynn and Ely Railway, the Lynn and Ely Railway Act 1845 (8 & 9 Vict. c. lv), received royal assent on 30 June 1845. Work started on the line in 1846 and so the railway arrived at Lynn on 27 October 1846. The original line ran South to Downham with the first station after Lynn being St Germain's. It took another two years to reach Ely. Great Eastern Railway. Lynn, when opened was a joint station (the Lynn and Ely Railway, and Lynn and Dereham Railway). However, on 22 July 1847 the Lynn and Ely and Lynn and Dereham railways were amalgamated to form the East Anglian Railways. A spur connecting the harbour was opened in 1849, and at one point was a complicated network of lines, boasting two swing bridges, serving premises on and around the town's South Quay. Another short branch, about three-quarters of a mile (1200 m) long, connecting the docks was opened in 1862 by the King's Lynn Docks and Railway Company. The railway was initially not welcomed by the port authorities in King's Lynn; they predicted that sea-bound trade would decline, and were later proved correct when through-trains to London ended up carrying the majority of freight to the capital.

King's Lynn opened as a junction station. The Lynn and Dereham Railway Act 1845 (8 & 9 Vict. c. cxxvi) of 21 July 1845, authorised a line which weaved a 26-mile (42 km) route to Dereham. The line opened to Narborough, on 27 October 1846, the same day the Lynn and Ely Railway opened to Downham. The line was extended to Swaffham, on 10 August 1847, opening in stages between 1846 and 1848. The line ran out of Lynn in a south-easterly direction with Middleton being the first station after Lynn. this later became part of the Great Eastern Railway.

Expansion followed with the opening of several branches. A line running north to the seaside resort of Hunstanton was opened in 1862, a journey celebrated by former Poet Laureate John Betjeman in a 1962 short BBC film about the line.

The Hunstanton line included Wolferton station, which served the Royal Family's Sandringham House, and handled numerous royal trains services. Because trains traveling to London from Wolferton routed through King's Lynn before heading south to King's Cross, local crowds regularly gathered at King Lynn's station to watch and cheer for the royal trains.

King's Lynn also received services from the Midland and Great Northern Joint Railway system, whose main station serving the town was in nearby South Lynn; a short shuttle service ran from King's Lynn to South Lynn as often as twenty times a day. The station opened in 1886, serving Sutton Bridge and Spalding to the west. Prior to the opening of South Lynn station, there had been a simple single platform station serving West Lynn, on the west bank of the River Ouse. An early constituent of the M&GN, the Lynn & Fakenham Railway, had used King's Lynn station, but ran into it from the north, via Gaywood Junction. This line was abandoned on the opening of the station at South Lynn. The "Lynn Avoiding" line was the last link in the chain which brought the eastern lines, which had reached Norwich in 1882, and Cromer in 1887, in direct contact with the lines west of Lynn.

King's Lynn's original station building was replaced by the current building by the builder Robert Skipper of Dereham in 1871–72, and was significantly extended in 1910; the original of 1846 was a somewhat rudimentary timber building on the site of the goods yards of the time. The Railway Cafe was opened in 1910 and celebrated the centenary of its opening in 2010.

=== Closures ===
At their peak, the railways in and around King's Lynn employed hundreds of people, but Britain's extensive railway cutbacks in the late 1950s and the following decades badly affected King's Lynn's railway services. The 1959 closure of the former M&GN's lines resulted in the closure of South Lynn railway station on 28 February that year, depriving King's Lynn of services to Norwich and Spalding. The dubious safety of a bridge over the Ouse, a very short way north-west of South Lynn station, was allegedly a significant factor in the closure of the whole route, and was demolished later that year. A section of this line about half a mile (800 m) long was left open for freight into the 1990s, transporting materials like oil and limestone to the sugar beet factory (since closed).

Other services suffered a similar fate in the following years. Passenger services to Hunstanton were discontinued in 1969, services to Wisbech (via Magdalen Road) ended in 1968, and the line to Dereham was closed in the same year, save for a three-mile section for sand freight from King's Lynn to Middleton. The closure of these services left only one passenger route in operation—services to Ely and Cambridge on the Fen Line.

Freight services to King's Lynn were less swiftly, but even more extensively, affected by cutbacks. Campbell's made heavy use of rail transport after opening its factory in Lynn in 1959, its curtain-sided wagons being one of the more distinctive sights on the Fen Line; but with the withdrawal of Speedlink services in the early 1990s, this traffic was lost to road transport. The branch to the harbour was progressively shortened before its final closure at around the same time, and the line to the docks closed as well (except for a short stub allowing the aforementioned freight trains from Middleton to change direction), the last train passing over the line in June 1994. The station's once-extensive goods yard suffered the same fate, the site being taken over by the station's car park and two large shops.

=== Modern day ===
Before electrification in 1992, InterCity (and, later, Network SouthEast) diesel locomotives such as the Class 37 operated most services. Many of these services featured full-service restaurant cars. Off-peak links were often provided by Metro-Cammell diesel multiple units, such as the Class 101.

For many years after electrification, and the consequent removal of diesel locomotives from passenger services, Class 317 electrical multiple units operated all services out of King's Lynn. While they were not as comfortable as the previous fleet of locomotive-hauled coaches, they quickly developed a reputation for reliability. A new siding alongside the Middleton Towers branch line, which extends for 14 chains (920 ft; 280 m), was commissioned in August 2020, to enable 8-car electric multiple units to be stabled when not in use.

Restoration work began in April 2013 as a station rewire which quickly grew into a heritage inspired project. The view taken was to restore the station to a 1949 state with British Rail branding and reminisces of the GER and LNER railways. The paint scheme was based upon a GER steam unit which had blue red and gold. GER cast iron benches were made locally by East Coast Castings in Wotton and BR style totems were hand-made alongside LNER station clocks. Platforms were resurfaced and LED lighting installed throughout public areas along with new CCTV. A Norfolk county flagpole was installed to replace the old one and canopies and roof restored and or replaced. The overall cost was under £1.1million. The project was jointly funded by First Capital Connect and Network Rail. The project's completion was marked with Michael Portillo unveiling a plaque in the booking hall area on 22 July 2014.

The only freight activity around King's Lynn today is the sand trains which run from the Middleton Towers branch to either Goole, Barnsley or Doncaster. These are usually operated by GB Railfreight. Occasionally, enthusiast railtours operate on this branch as well.

== Facilities ==
The station is well equipped with accessible toilets, ticket machines and a ticket office, departure screens, a car park and cycle spaces. There is also a taxi rank outside the station.

== Passenger volume ==
The annual passenger volume figures are as follows. The statistics cover twelve-month periods that start in April.

== Services ==
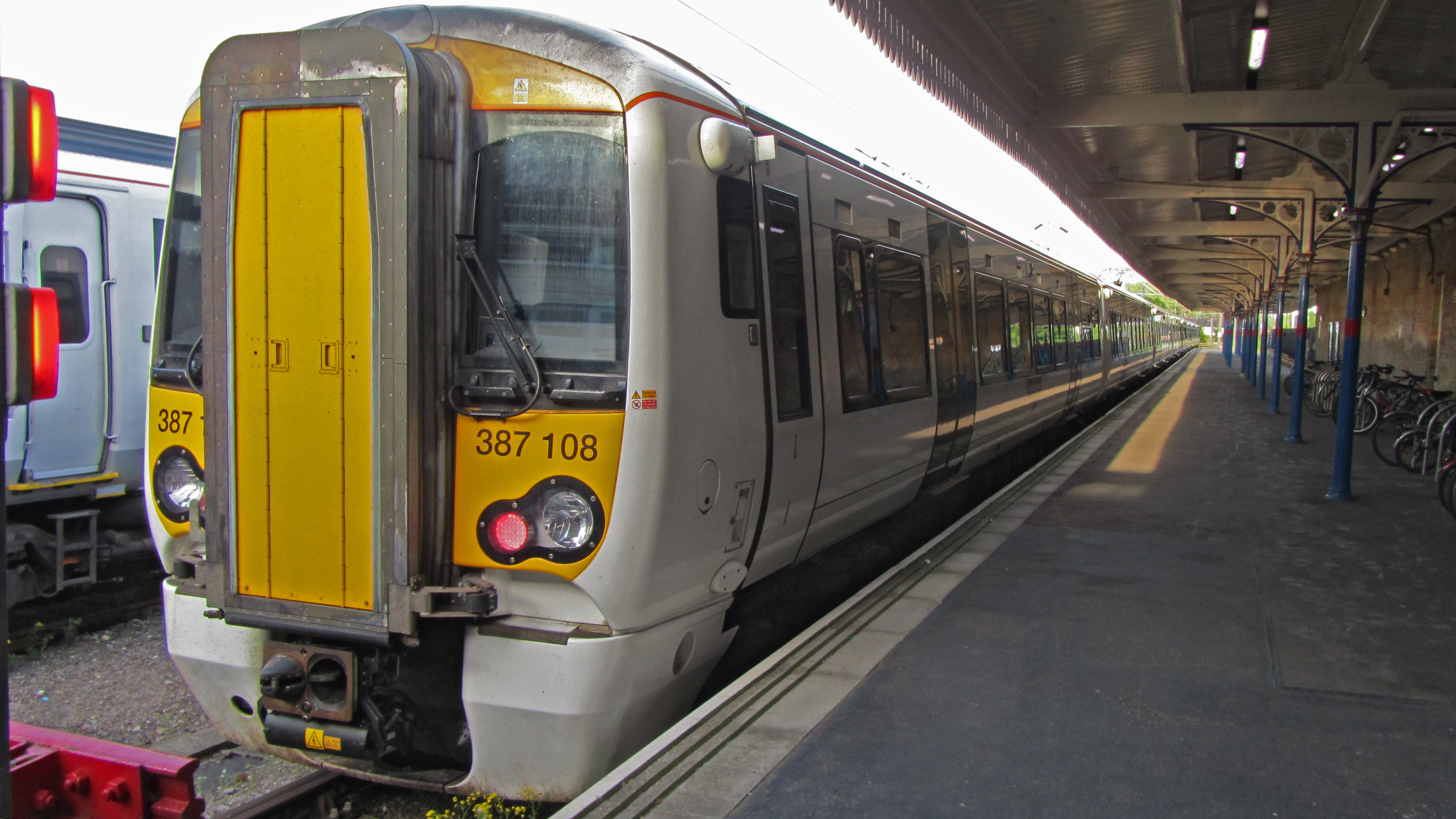
Great Northern Class 387 at King's Lynn

The station is served by Great Northern as part of its service from King's Cross. Trains run non-stop between London Kings Cross and Cambridge South and then call at all stations along the Fen Line via Ely. The typical journey time from London is 1 hour 45 minutes. An hourly service operates for most of the day, increasing to 2 trains per hour at peak times. Before the May 2023 timetable change, Greater Anglia also operated a limited number a services to London Liverpool Street, which have since been withdrawn.

It was originally intended that King's Lynn would be included in the Thameslink Programme, so that most trains for London from King's Lynn would be diverted on to the Thameslink route to St Pancras, Farringdon and beyond, rather than terminating at King's Cross. However, this did not occur and King's Lynn trains continue to provide the fast service from Cambridge South to Kings Cross.

Preceding station	National Rail	Following station
Watlington	Great Northern Fen Line	Terminus
Historical railways
St Germain's Line open, station closed	Great Eastern Railway Fen Line	Terminus
Disused railways
Terminus	Great Eastern Railway Lynn and Dereham Railway	Middleton Towers Line and station closed
Terminus	Great Eastern Railway Lynn and Hunstanton Railway	North Wootton Line and station closed
Terminus	Midland and Great Northern Joint Railway	South Lynn Line and station closed

== See also ==
- Railways in Norfolk
- Fen Line
- King's Lynn
- South Lynn railway station
