= Thomas Pell Platt =

English orientalist

Thomas Pell Platt (1798–1852) was an English orientalist.

== Life ==
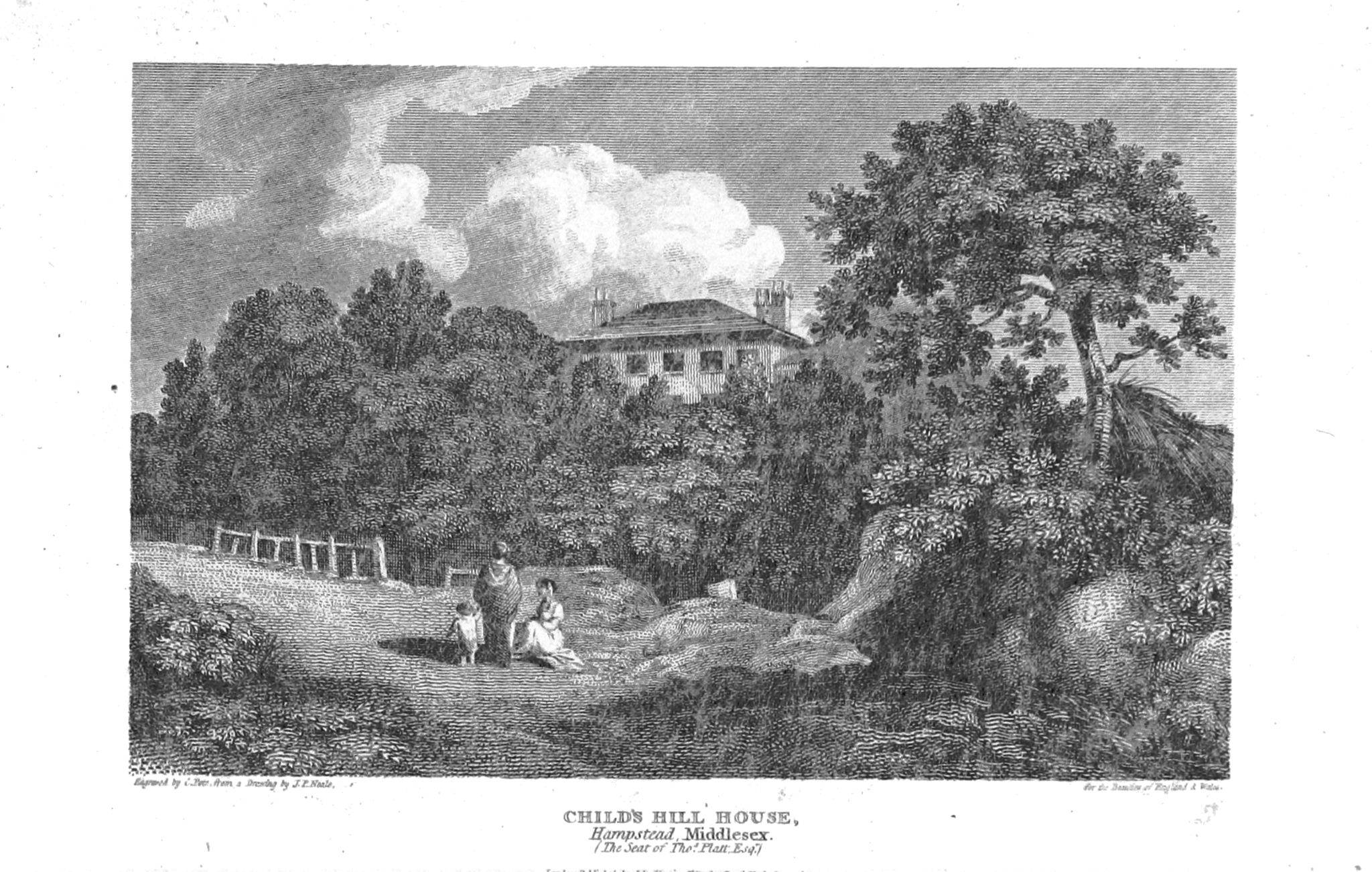
The house at Child's Hill, enlarged by Platt's father Thomas in 1811.

Born in London, he was the son of Thomas Platt. After attending a school at Little Dunham, Norfolk, he was admitted at Trinity College, Cambridge, as pensioner on 25 Nov. 1815. He was elected a scholar on 3 April 1818, a minor fellow on 2 October 1820, and a major fellow on 2 July 1823. He graduated with a B.A. in 1820, and an M.A. in 1823. While at Cambridge he became connected with the British and Foreign Bible Society, where he served for several years as its librarian.

Platt was one of the earliest members of the Royal Asiatic Society, and sat on its oriental translation committee. He was also a Fellow of the Society of Antiquaries of London. He lived for many years at Child's Hill, Hampstead, dying at Dulwich Hill in Surrey, on 31 October 1852. He left an only son, Francis Thomas Platt.

== Works ==
In 1823 Platt published a catalogue of Ethiopian biblical manuscripts in the Royal Library of Paris and in the library of the British and Foreign Bible Society; and in succeeding years collated and edited for the Society texts of the New Testament. He made notes of the readings which particularly struck, in the Gospels; for the Acts and the Epistles he used only one manuscript and Brian Walton's text. In 1829 he also prepared an edition of the Syriac Gospels, and in 1844 edited an Amharic version of the Bible, using the translation of Abba Rukh for the Old Testament, and that of Abu Rumi Habessinus for the New.

In 1827 Platt defended the British and Foreign Bible Society from an attack made on their publications in the Quarterly Review. In 1840, in a Letter to Dr. Pusey, he described his conversion from evangelical opinions to Tractarian views. He objected, however, to some of the Tractarian interpretations of the prophecies in the Old Testament.

== Notes ==
Attribution

This article incorporates text from a publication now in the public domain: Lee, Sidney, ed. (1896). "Platt, Thomas Pell". Dictionary of National Biography. Vol. 45. London: Smith, Elder & Co.
