= Sporle railway station =

Former railway station in England

Coordinates: 52.6760°N 0.7344°E

Sporle

General information
- Location: Sporle with Palgrave, Norfolk; England

Other information
- Status: Disused

History
- Original company: Lynn and Dereham Railway

Key dates
- 26 Oct 1847: Opened
- Oct 1850: Closed
Location

Sporle railway station was located on the line between Swaffham and Dunham. It opened with the line in 1847 and was temporarily the terminus of the line from Swaffham, while building works were being completed towards Dereham (the next section of the line opening the following year). It served the parish of Sporle with Palgrave. The station, which was short-lived closed three years after opening in 1850.

Preceding station	Disused railways	Following station
Swaffham; Line and station closed	Great Eastern Railway; Lynn and Dereham Railway	Dunham; Line and station closed
