= Railways in Norfolk =

Railway networks in Norfolk, England

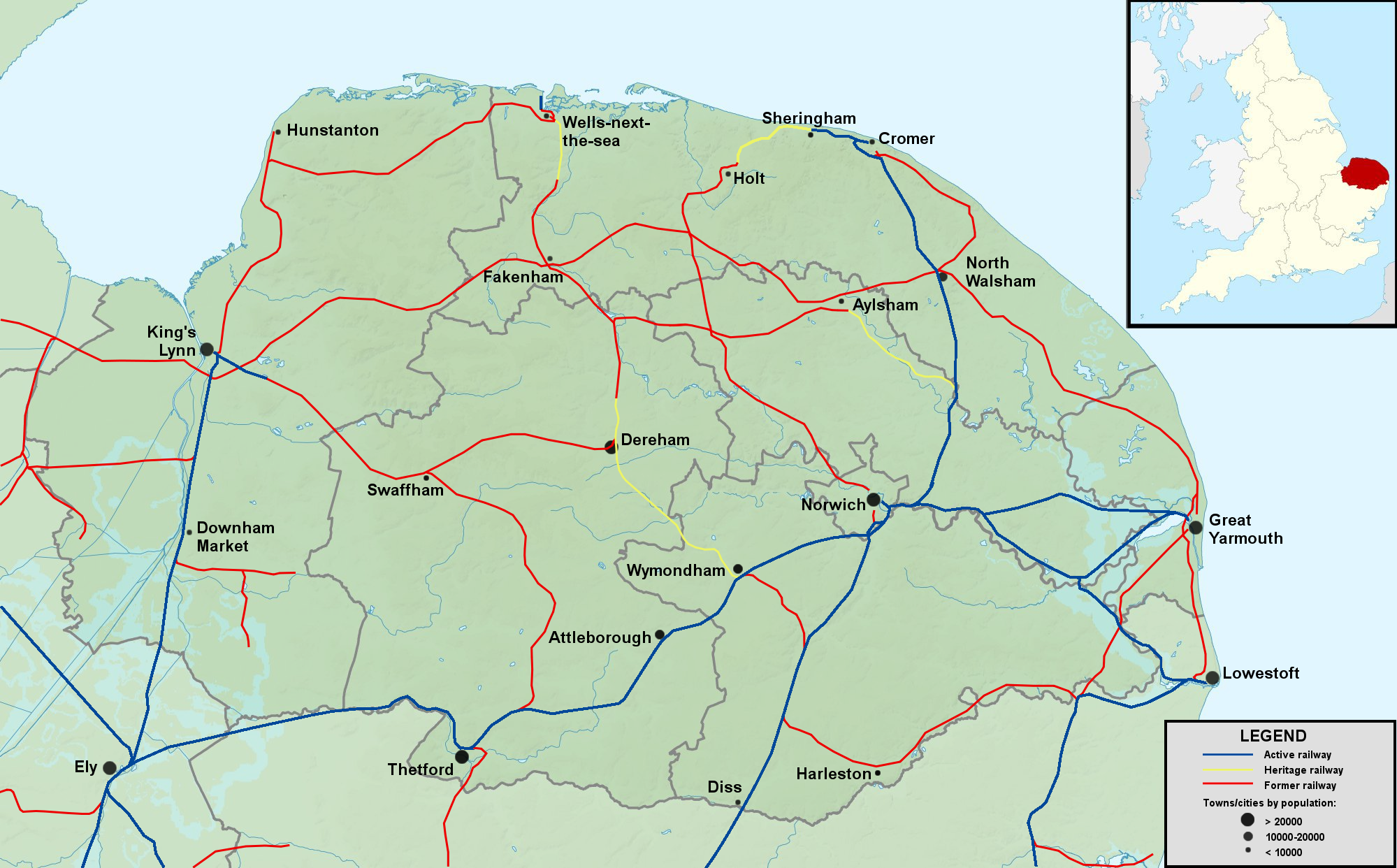
Active, heritage, and former railways of Norfolk

Railways have played an important part in the history and development of the English county of Norfolk. It currently has thirty open National Rail stations, though there were once well over a hundred.

Between 1959 and 1970 much of the network was closed, including more than two thirds of Norfolk's railway stations, several main lines and most of the branch lines - leaving only a core network in place.

Several of the former routes have since been re-opened as heritage railway lines, such as the North Norfolk Railway and the Mid-Norfolk Railway.

== History ==
=== Arrival of the railway ===
The railway first arrived in Norfolk in 1845 with a major extension of an existing line from London which previously had stopped short of Cambridge at Bishop's Stortford. The extension had been built in sections by three different companies: the Northern and Eastern Railway (N&ER) — Bishop's Stortford to Newport; the Eastern Counties Railway (ECR) — Newport through Cambridge to Brandon); and the Norwich and Brandon Railway (N&B) — Brandon via Wymondham to Norwich. However, the ECR had already held on lease the N&ER's line from Stratford to Bishop's Stortford, and it continued to operate all the services over the expanded route, whose parts were opened simultaneously. Its original terminus was at Trowse on the outskirts of Norwich.

In 1849 this route was joined by the Eastern Union Railway (EUR) line from Haughley to Norwich, extending its own lines from Colchester via Ipswich, creating a new terminus at Norwich Victoria. This route is now the Great Eastern Main Line. Journey times to the capital were shorter on this route, and it soon became very profitable.

King's Lynn had been linked to the country's growing railway network in 1846, and in 1862 the line was extended on to Hunstanton.

=== Expansion of the network ===
The creation of the Midland and Great Northern Joint Railway, a combined venture between the Midland railway and the Great Northern Railway merged several smaller schemes into a larger proposal of creating a new main line from the Midlands into Norfolk.

The M&GNR created a hub at Melton Constable, which served as a junction for the route with lines heading west to the Midlands, north to Cromer, south to Norwich and east towards Great Yarmouth as well as housing a major engineering works.

In the late Victorian era with the new waves of holiday passengers during the summer months, and the increased routes for cross-Britain trade, Norfolk boomed thanks to the new rail network.

Despite this some stations such as Bluestone railway station and Starston railway station closed shortly after opening, as traffic was considered too low to justify keeping them open. Other schemes, such as a proposed branch line extension to Blakeney, were dropped when they appeared uneconomical.

=== Groupings and nationalisation ===
In 1923 the Railways Act 1921 came into force which resulted in British railways being merged into four main companies. Much of the county's routes came under the control of the London and North Eastern Railway, though the Midland and Great Northern Joint Railway maintained its independence, and remained one of the few routes outside of the new system.

In 1948, all British rail companies were nationalised and Britain's railways came under state control. Until 1997 all of Norfolk's stations were under the control of British Rail.

=== Beeching Axe ===
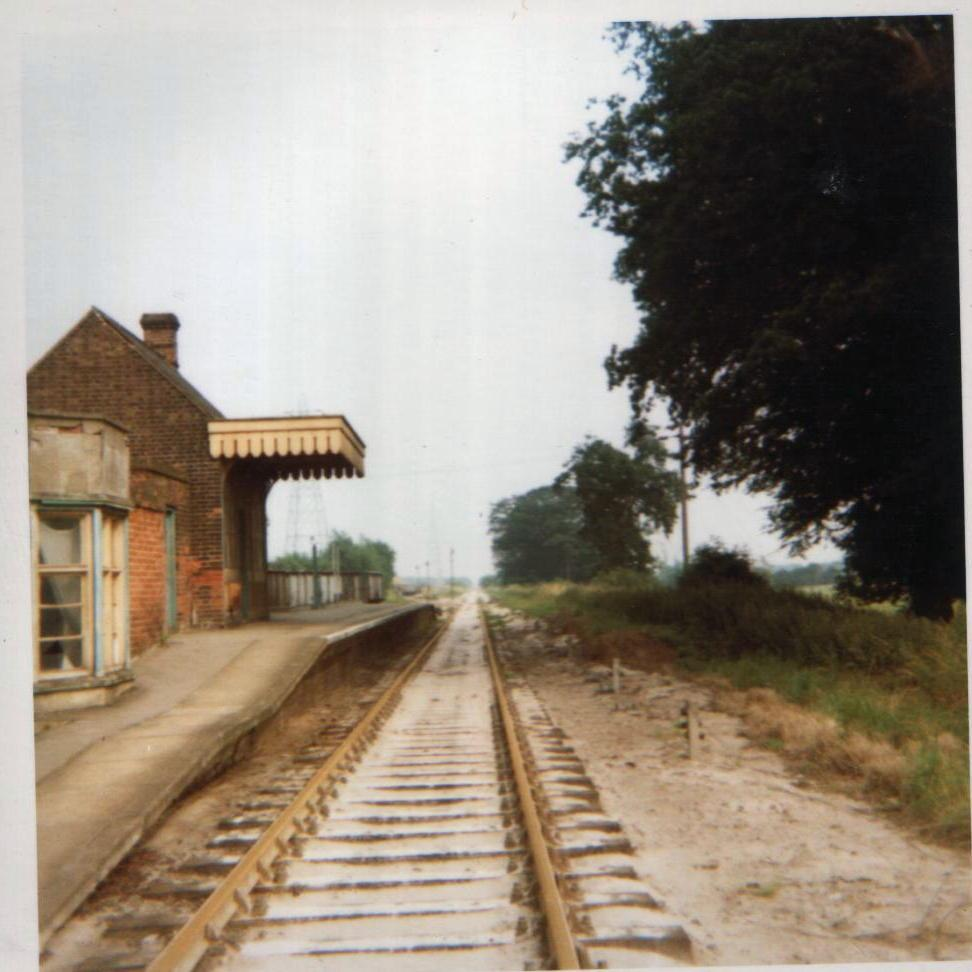
Many stations like Middleton Towers were closed in the wake of the Beeching cuts.

A number of the cuts to the Norfolk network predated the Beeching cuts by several years. In 1959 the Main Line of the Midland and Great Northern Joint Railway was closed, on economic grounds. Essential maintenance work was considered too much to be justified.

As car ownership increased, the need for rural routes was considered lessened, and the least profitable were screened for closure in order to save money. Beeching issued a report in 1962, recommending that a large number of stations and lines be closed.

In Norfolk, on the principal routes, such as the Great Eastern Main Line, a number of the intermediate stations at small rural towns and villages were closed, to speed up journey times. Smaller branch lines like the Waveney Valley Line were closed completely.

Many of the former trackbeds were tuned into pathways such as Marriott's Way, which remain open to cyclists and pedestrians. Many of the former stations were converted for private use.

A few routes managed to survive the initial cuts, such as the line between Lowestoft and Great Yarmouth which survived until 1970. The Bittern Line was not proposed for closure, and stayed open. But King's Lynn-Hunstanton and King's Lynn-Dereham-Wymondham closed despite not being proposed for closure in the Report.

A second report by Beeching had proposed even more severe cuts to the East Anglia rail network, leaving only the Main Line into Norwich, but it was rejected by the government.

== Heritage railways ==
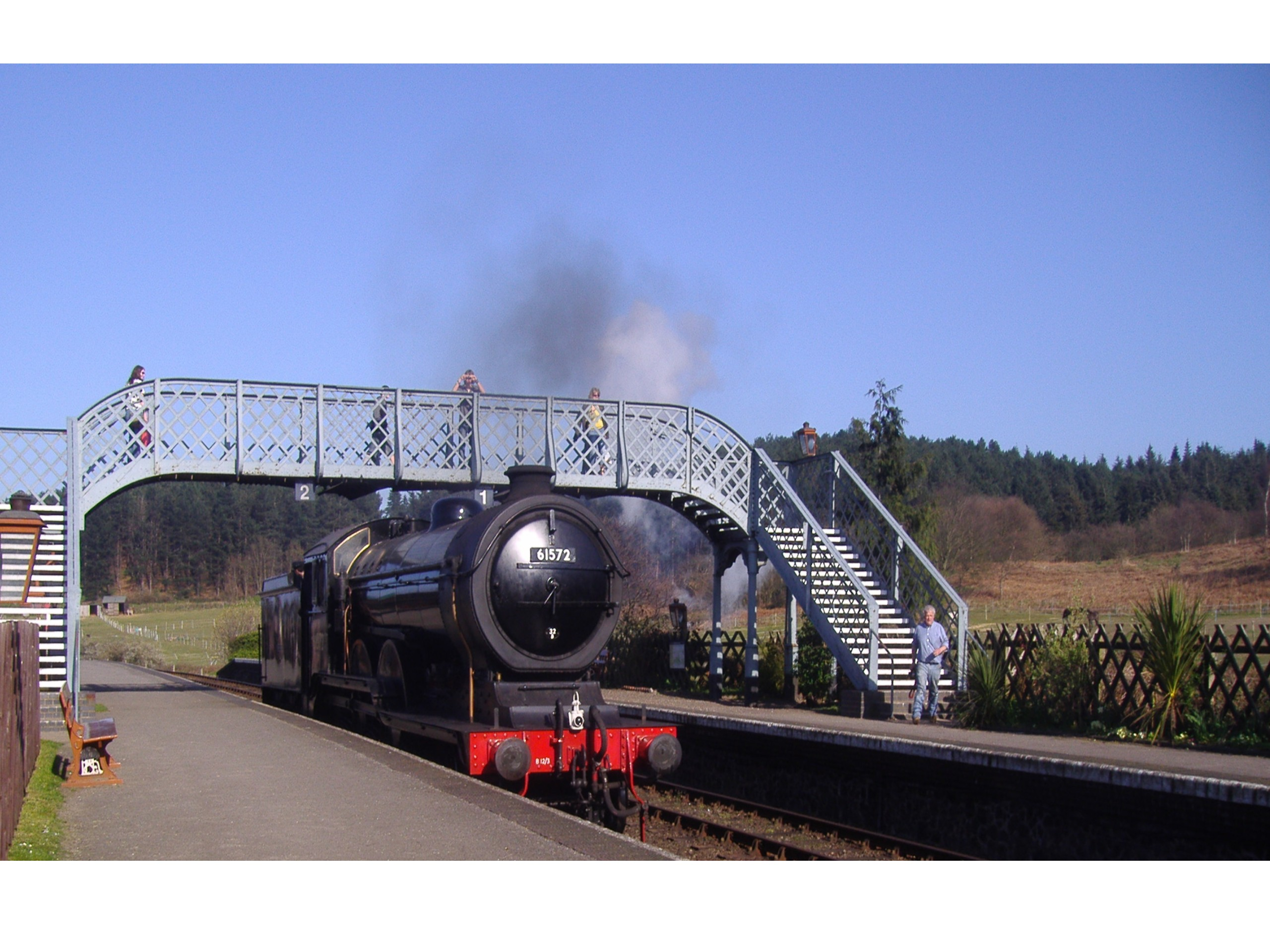
Several heritage railways operate in Norfolk, including the North Norfolk Railway.

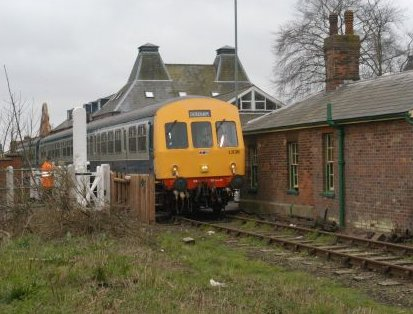
Class 101 DMU on the Mid-Norfolk Railway

Norfolk is home to around five heritage railways and various preserved train stations.

=== North Norfolk Railway ===
The North Norfolk Railway operates a preserved five-mile route between Holt and Sheringham (via, Weybourne) on the Norfolk coast. It was preserved in the 1960s/70s, and the extension to Holt opened in 1987.

=== Mid-Norfolk Railway ===
The Mid-Norfolk Railway operates a preserved fifteen-mile route between Wymondham and Worthing, A further two and a half mile extension to County School station is planned. It is also proposed to extend south to Wymondham Junction, to connect services with the National Rail main line at nearby Wymondham.

=== Bure Valley Railway ===
The Bure Valley Railway is a 15-inch gauge railway that runs for nine miles between Aylsham and Wroxham.

=== Wells and Walsingham Light Railway ===
The Wells and Walsingham is a 10¼ in gauge railway which runs for four miles from Wells-next-the-Sea to Walsingham (via, Wighton).

=== Whitwell and Reepham Railway ===
The Whitwell and Reepham Railway, is a newcomer to the UK Preservation Movement, it currently only runs just a few yards of newly relayed track, based at Whitwell Station, itself.

== Existing network ==
There are currently thirty working National Rail stations in Norfolk. Most of the major towns and settlements are served by trains. Norwich railway station is the busiest station, being used by around two and a half million passengers a year. The network is currently administered by Network Rail: services in the east of the county are mainly provided by Abellio Greater Anglia with regional services by East Midlands Railway; and in the west by Great Northern with a weekday peak-hours commuting service by Abellio Greater Anglia.

== Future ==
The Norfolk Orbital Railway is a proposal to link the Mid-Norfolk Railway and the North Norfolk Railway to create a line running from Sheringham to Wymondham, restoring regular services to Fakenham and Melton Constable.

In 2008 Hunstanton Council considered a proposal to re-open the line from King's Lynn, but decided against it.

== Bibliography ==
- British Railway Atlas. 1947
