= Richard Frankham =

Australian biologist, author

Richard (Dick) Frankham
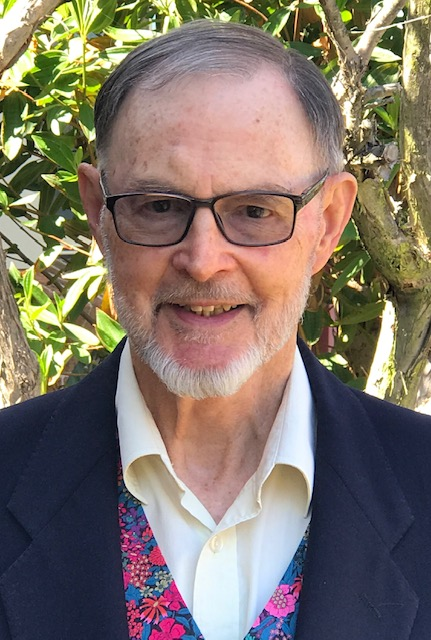
- Citizenship: Australia
- Occupations: Biologist, author, and academic
- Awards: MJD White Medal, Genetics Society of Australia; Whitley Commendation, Royal Zoological Society of NSW; Ulysses S. Seal Award for Innovation in Conservation, CPSG of SSC/IUCN

Academic background
- Education: BScAgrHons I in Agriculture; PhD in Animal Genetics; DSc Conservation and Evolution of Small Populations
- Alma mater: University of Sydney; Macquarie University
- Doctoral advisor: J. Stuart F. Barker

Academic work
- Institutions: Agriculture Canada, Lacombe, Alberta; University of Chicago; Macquarie University
- Main interests: Conservation genetics Evolutionary genetics Quantitative genetics Conservation biology Animal breeding
- Notable works: Introduction to Conservation Genetics, A Primer of Conservation Genetics, Genetic Management of Fragmented Animal and Plant Populations, A Practical Guide for Genetic Management of Fragmented Animal and Plant Populations

Richard (Dick) Frankham (born April 4, 1942) is an Australian biologist, author, and academic. He is an Emeritus Professor in Biology at Macquarie University in Sydney, Australia.

Frankham's research interests are primarily in the evolutionary genetics of small populations, spanning the fields of quantitative genetics, animal breeding, conservation genetics, and conservation biology. He is the senior author of five textbooks, including Introduction to Conservation Genetics in 2002. A Primer of Conservation Genetics in 2004, Genetic Management of Fragmented Animal and Plant Populations in 2017, and A Practical Guide for Genetic Management of Fragmented Animal and Plant Populations in 2019. There have been five translations of their textbooks into Chinese, Japanese, Italian, Portuguese, and Korean.

He is the recipient of the M.J.D. White Medal of the Genetics Society of Australasia for his career contributions, a Ulysses S. Seal Award for Innovation in Conservation from CPSG and a Whitley Special Commendation for his books on conservation

== Early life and education ==
Frankham was born in Singleton, New South Wales, Australia. He earned a Bachelor of Science in Agriculture with first-class honours from the University of Sydney in 1964, followed in 1968 by a Ph.D. in animal genetics from the same institution, supervised by J. Stuart F. Barker.

== Scientific career ==
From 1967 until 1969, Frankham was a Research Scientist (poultry) for Agriculture Canada, in Lacombe, Alberta. Following this he had a postdoctoral fellowship with Richard Lewontin at the University of Chicago (1969–1971). In 1971, he joined Macquarie University in Sydney Australia as a Lecturer and was promoted to Senior Lecturer, Associate Professor, and Professor until his formal retirement in 2002. He has continued full-time research since 2002 as a Visiting Professor and Emeritus Professor. His research contributions were recognised by the award of a D.Sc. from Macquarie University in 2005. In 2004, he was Hrdy Visiting professor at Harvard University.

== Research ==
Frankham's research has covered a range of topics in quantitative genetics/animal breeding, population genetics, conservation biology, and especially conservation genetics. It has involved primary research papers using Drosophila fruit flies as a model species, computer modeling, analytical theory, Darwinian syntheses, meta-analyses, and reviews.

Frankham has authored or co-authored 186 publications that have been cited widely. He was ranked 2715th among global scientists for scientific impact according to a joint publication by John Ioannidis and his colleagues, in 2020.

=== Genetic management ===
Frankham and his collaborators are known for significantly influencing the genetic management of fragmented populations, providing important contributions to the practical management of threatened species. They identified lack of gene flow in fragmented populations and lack of remedial management actions as one of the most important, largely unaddressed problems in conservation biology, identified the primary cause of this problems as fears that crossing populations would be harmful (outbreeding depression), devised a procedure to estimate the risk of outbreeding depression, showed it worked, showed that outcrossing typically leads to large benefits in reproduction and survival, and advocated for a paradigm shift in genetic management of fragmented populations.

Frankham's team provided the experimental test in a living organism of what is now the recommended genetic management procedure for threatened species (minimizing mean kinship). With collaborators, he modelled the genetic benefits and cost-effectiveness of integrating biobanking into the conservation of frogs and marsupials.

=== Convention of biodiversity ===
From 2020 to 2023, Frankham has been involved in attempts to strengthen the genetic content of the Convention on Biodiversity through committee work and publications. He elucidated the potential genetic harm to species if the proposed genetic goals and targets were inculcated for the Convention on Biological Diversity (CBD) and proposed better alternative indicators. With collaborators, he then discussed the evolution of global biodiversity framework (GBF) and recommended several measures to improve it in order to conserve genetic diversity.

== Awards and fellowships ==
- 1997 - 2002 – Scientific Fellow, Zoological Society of London
- 2017 – MJD White Medal, Genetics Society of Australasia
- 2019 – Whitley Book Award, Royal Zoological Society of New South Wales
- 2023 – Ulysses S. Seal Award for Innovation in Conservation from CPSG

== Bibliography ==
=== Books ===
- Introduction to Conservation Genetics (2002) ISBN 978-0521702713
- A Primer of Conservation Genetics (2004) ISBN 978-0977480708
- Introduction to Conservation Genetics, 2nd edition (2010) ISBN 978-0521702713
- Genetic Management of Fragmented Animal and Plant Populations (2017) ISBN 978-0198783404
- A Practical Guide for Genetic Management of Fragmented Animal and Plant Populations (2019) ISBN 978-0198783428

=== Selected articles ===
- Frankham, R.; Briscoe, D. A.; Nurthen, R. K. (March 1978). "Unequal crossing over at the rRNA locus as a source of quantitative genetic variation". Nature. 272 (5648): 80–81. Bibcode:1978Natur.272...80F. doi:10.1038/272080a0. PMID 415250.
- Frankham, Richard (October 1995). "Effective population size/adult population size ratios in wildlife: a review". Genetical Research. 66 (2): 95–107. doi:10.1017/S0016672300034455.
- Brook, Barry W.; O'Grady, Julian J.; Chapman, Andrew P.; Burgman, Mark A.; Akçakaya, H. Resit; Frankham, Richard (March 2000). "Predictive accuracy of population viability analysis in conservation biology". Nature. 404 (6776): 385–387. Bibcode:2000Natur.404..385B. doi:10.1038/35006050. PMID 10746724.
- Reed, David H.; Frankham, Richard (February 2003). "Correlation between Fitness and Genetic Diversity". Conservation Biology. 17 (1): 230–237. doi:10.1046/j.1523-1739.2003.01236.x.
- Spielman, Derek; Brook, Barry W.; Frankham, Richard (19 October 2004). "Most species are not driven to extinction before genetic factors impact them". Proceedings of the National Academy of Sciences. 101 (42): 15261–15264. Bibcode:2004PNAS..10115261S. doi:10.1073/pnas.0403809101. PMC 524053. PMID 15477597.
- Frankham, Richard; Bradshaw, Corey J.A.; Brook, Barry W. (February 2014). "Genetics in conservation management: Revised recommendations for the 50/500 rules, Red List criteria and population viability analyses". Biological Conservation. 170: 56–63. Bibcode:2014BCons.170...56F. doi:10.1016/j.biocon.2013.12.036.
- Howell, Lachlan G.; Frankham, Richard; Rodger, John C.; Witt, Ryan R.; Clulow, Simon; Upton, Rose M. O.; Clulow, John (March 2021). "Integrating biobanking minimises inbreeding and produces significant cost benefits for a threatened frog captive breeding programme". Conservation Letters. 14 (2) e12776. Bibcode:2021ConL...14E2776H. doi:10.1111/conl.12776. hdl:10536/DRO/DU:30160439.
- Frankham, Richard (October 1, 2022). "Evaluation of proposed genetic goals and targets for the Convention on Biological Diversity". Conservation Genetics. 23 (5): 865–870. Bibcode:2022ConG...23..865F. doi:10.1007/s10592-022-01459-1.
