= Little Dunham =

Village in Norfolk, England

Coordinates: 52.679954°N 0.759774°E

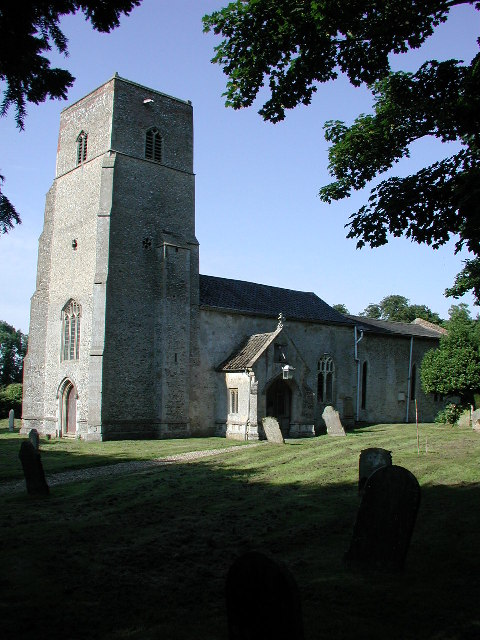
- St Margaret's Church, Little Dunham

- Location within Norfolk
- Area: 7.49 km^{2} (2.89 sq mi)
- Population: 309 UK census 2001
  - Density: 41/km^{2} (110/sq mi)
- OS grid reference: TF867127
- District: Breckland
- Shire county: Norfolk
- Region: East
- Country: England
- Sovereign state: United Kingdom
- Post town: KING'S LYNN
- Postcode district: PE32
- Dialling code: 01760
- Police: Norfolk
- Fire: Norfolk
- Ambulance: East of England
- UK Parliament: South West Norfolk

Little Dunham is a village situated in the Breckland District of Norfolk and covers an area of 749 hectares (2.9 square miles) with a population of 309 at the 2001 census. The village lies 1 1/2 miles (2.4 km) south of its sister village Great Dunham and 6 miles (10 km) by road north east from Swaffham.

Little Dunham is served by the church of St Margaret in the Benefice of Great Dunham.

The unusual Fransham Obelisk raised in the memory of Lord Nelson is in Little Dunham.

Thomas Pell Platt, orientalist went to school in Little Dunham.
