= Wendling, Norfolk =

Village in Norfolk, England

Coordinates: 52.67904°N 0.85516°E

Wendling
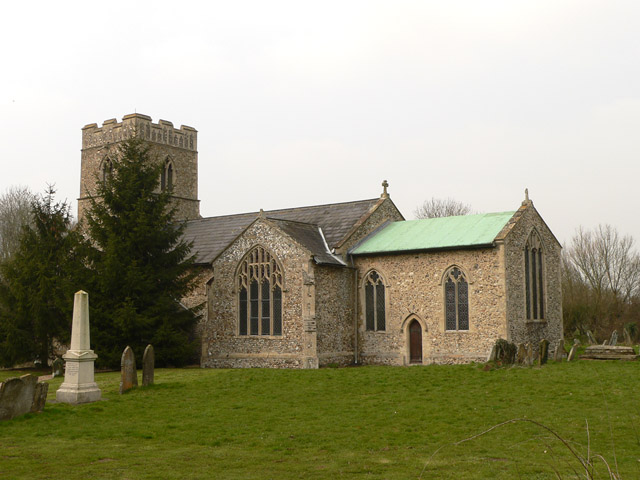
- St Peter & St Paul, Wendling

- Location within Norfolk
- Area: 5.25 km^{2} (2.03 sq mi)
- Population: 313 (2011 census)
  - Density: 60/km^{2} (160/sq mi)
- OS grid reference: TF931128
- Civil parish: Wendling
- District: Breckland
- Shire county: Norfolk
- Region: East
- Country: England
- Sovereign state: United Kingdom
- Post town: DEREHAM
- Postcode district: NR19
- Dialling code: 01362
- Police: Norfolk
- Fire: Norfolk
- Ambulance: East of England
- UK Parliament: Mid Norfolk

Wendling is a village and civil parish in the English county of Norfolk. It covers an area of 5.25 km^{2} (2.03 sq mi) and had a population of 323 in 140 households at the 2001 census, reducing to a population of 313 in 129 households at the 2011 Census. For the purposes of local government, it falls within the district of Breckland.

The villages name possibly means "W(a)endel's people" or perhaps, "Wennel's place". The exact form of the personal name is not clear.

The pioneering photographer Robert Howlett, famous for his iconic portrait of the engineer Isambard Kingdom Brunel, is buried in the churchyard of St Peter and St Paul.

The village was served by Wendling railway station until 1968.
