= Fransham =

Civil parish in Norfolk, England

Coordinates: 52.6800°N 0.8171°E

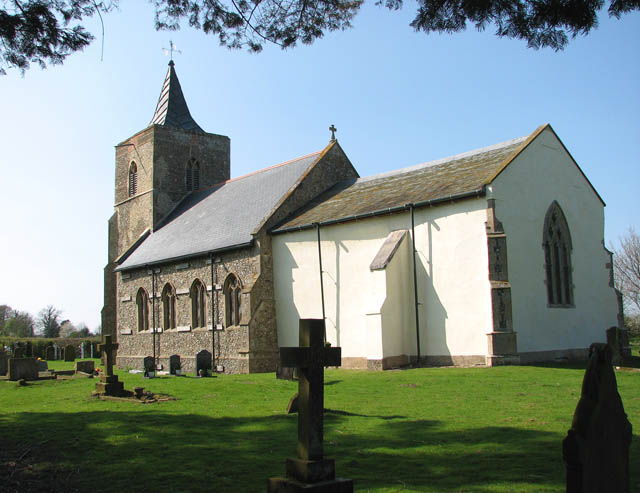
- Great Fransham

- Location within Norfolk
- Area: 4.69 sq mi (12.1 km^{2})
- Population: 443 (2021 census)
  - Density: 94/sq mi (36/km^{2})
- OS grid reference: TF9053312872
- Civil parish: Fransham
- District: Breckland
- Shire county: Norfolk
- Region: East
- Country: England
- Sovereign state: United Kingdom
- Post town: DEREHAM
- Postcode district: NR19
- Dialling code: 01362
- Police: Norfolk
- Fire: Norfolk
- Ambulance: East of England
- UK Parliament: South West Norfolk

Fransham is a civil parish in the Breckland district of the English county of Norfolk. Fransham includes the villages of Great Fransham and Little Fransham, as well as the hamlet of Crane's End.

Fransham is located 6 miles (9.7 km) east from Swaffham and 6 1/2 miles (10.5 km) west from Dereham, along the A47.

In local dialect, it may be pronounced "Franson", or "Fransum"

== History ==
Fransham's name is of Anglo-Saxon origin and derives from the Old English for Fram's homestead or village.

Old Hall in Little Fransham was built in the Sixteenth Century and possibly once played host to Queen Elizabeth I. Hyde Hall in Great Fransham was built in the Eighteenth Century and has staircases that have been designated of national importance.

== Geography ==
According to the 2021 census, Fransham has a population of 443 people which shows an increase from the 433 people recorded in the 2011 census.

The A47, between Birmingham and Lowestoft, runs through the parish.

== All Saints' Church ==
Great Fransham's church dates from the Thirteenth Century, is located on Station Road and has been Grade II listed since 1960. All Saints' remains open for Sunday services once a month.

The interior of All Saints' is mostly simple in design except for a Fifteenth Century font and some well preserved brass memorials of Sir Geoffrey de Fransham (1415) and Cecily Legge (1500).

== St. Mary's Church ==
Little Fransham's church is dedicated to Saint Mary and dates from the Fourteenth Century. St. Mary's is located on Station Road and has been Grade I listed since 1951. St. Mary's remains open for Sunday services once a month.

The church suffered from a tower collapse in 1700 and still holds a set of royal arms from the reign of King George III.

== Amenities ==
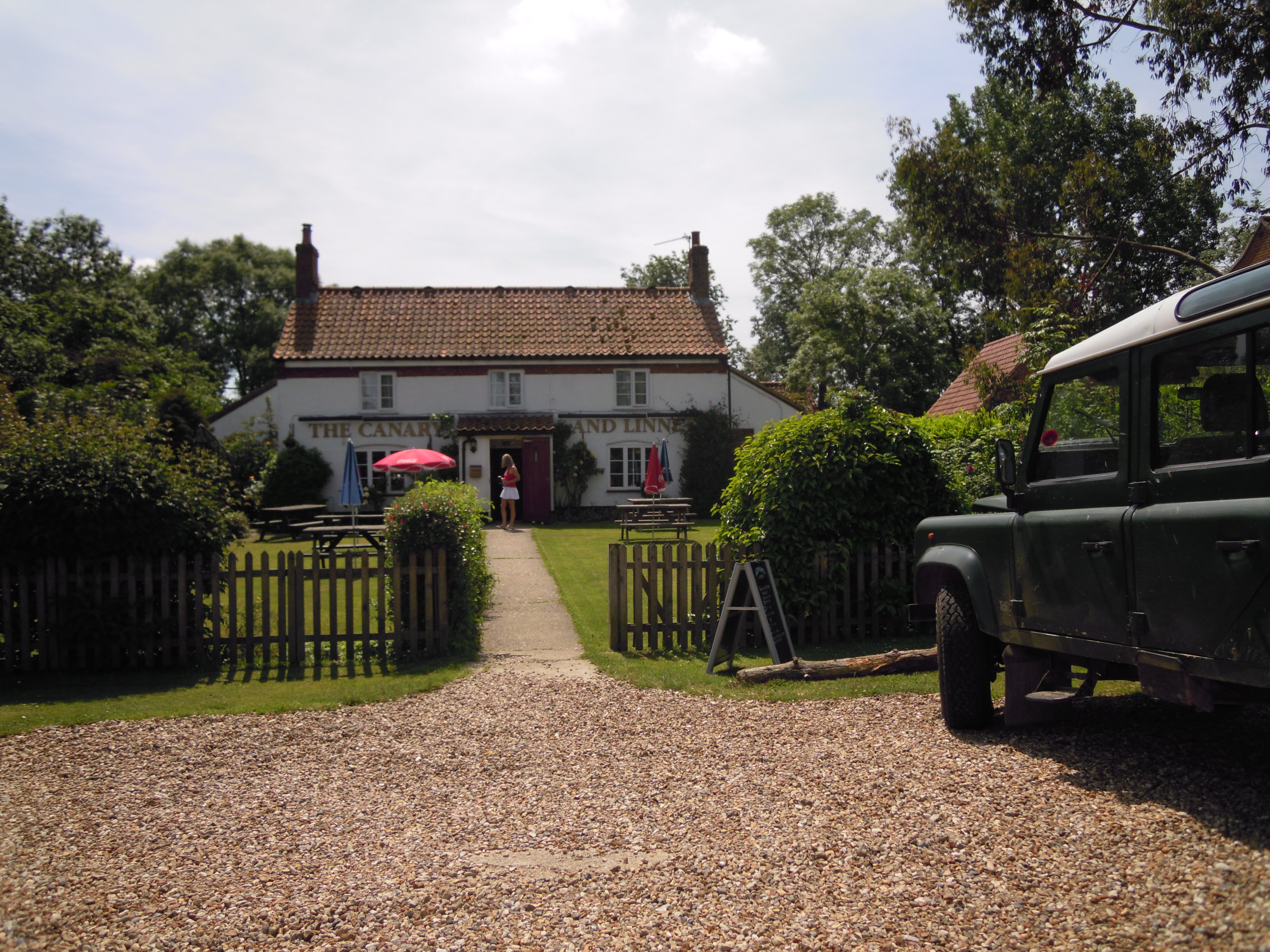
The Canary and Linnet public house

The local pub in Little Fransham, the Canary and Linnet is just off the A47. Its name derives from the fact that the village is halfway between Norwich and King's Lynn ('Canaries' and 'Linnets' being the respective nicknames of Norwich City and King's Lynn Town football clubs). Great Fransham had a public house called Chequers which is now a private dwelling.

There is a commercially working forge with public demonstrations available.

== Governance ==
Fransham is part of the electoral ward of Launditch for local elections and is part of the district of Breckland.

George Freeman is the Conservative MP for Mid Norfolk, and has been an MP continually since 6 May 2010.
