= Lynn and Dereham Railway =

Railway line in Norfolk, England

Overview
- Headquarters: King's Lynn
- Locale: England
- Dates of operation: 1846–1968 (passengers)
- Successor: Great Eastern Railway

Technical
- Track gauge: 4 ft 8 1/2 in (1,435 mm)
- Length: 26 1/2 miles (42.6 km)

The Lynn and Dereham Railway is a largely closed standard gauge 26 1/2-mile (42.6 km) single track railway running between King's Lynn and Dereham in the English county of Norfolk. The Lynn to Dereham line opened in 1846 and closed to passenger services in 1968, although the section between Middleton Towers and King's Lynn remains open to freight.

== History ==
Lynn and Dereham Railway Act 1845
- Act of Parliament
- Parliament of the United Kingdom
- Long title: An Act for making a Railway from Lynn to Dereham.
- Citation: 8 & 9 Vict. c. cxxvi

Dates
- Royal assent: 21 July 1845

The Lynn and Dereham Railway, wove a 26.5-mile (42.6 km) route to East Dereham via Narborough and Swaffham. It was authorised by the Lynn and Dereham Railway Act 1845 (8 & 9 Vict. c. cxxvi) which was given royal assent on 21 July 1845, opening in stages between 1846 and 1848; It later became part of the Great Eastern Railway. Only the section of line between King's Lynn and Narborough was opened under the L&DR, on 17 October 1846. The remainder of the line was opened in stages by the L&DR's immediate successor, the East Anglian Railways. The original intention of the company had been to extend their line to Great Yarmouth, via Norwich, but this plan was blocked by the rival Wymondham to Dereham scheme proposed by the Norfolk Railway.

A reported case in the Court of Common Pleas in 1850 reported that a five-mile section of the railway was constructed at a cost of £41,029. The case concerned a mason and bricklayer (Mr. Heyhoe) suing for his fees after two of the partners (a Mr. Fry and a Mr. Frost) of the firm to whom the railway had subcontracted the job had become bankrupt, the issue being whether a third person (Mr. Burge) was also a partner and thus liable for the partnership debts. The case is still considered an authority in English law on when a person who has not signed a partnership deed can be treated as regards outsiders as a partner in the firm by reason of the conduct of the parties.

Diesel units were introduced in 1955, based at Dereham. Services increased from 5 or 6, to twelve a day and journey time was cut to an average of 54 minutes. Prior to that passenger trains were mostly worked by D16s and freight by J17s.

The line was not listed for closure in the original 1963 Beeching Report. But it was nonetheless closed to passenger and freight services by the Eastern Region of British Railways on Saturday 7 September 1968, save for a three-mile section for sand freight from King's Lynn to Middleton. Wendling station continued for a short while as a filming location, with the station and its road bridge featuring in several episodes of the British situation comedy Dad's Army.

== Route ==
The line starts at King's Lynn, where the original station building was replaced by the current building in 1871, and has remained largely unchanged since; the original was a somewhat rudimentary timber building on the site of the goods yards of the time. Leaving the station the line passed through the goods yard, passed the locomotive shed and the harbour branch before crossing over the junction for the lines to Hunstanton and Cambridge.

Soon after leaving King's Lynn the route passed under the former Midland and Great Northern Joint Railway. The first station on the route was at Middleton Towers. This small station remains in use as a freight terminus, and the station has been the destination of a number of charter trains. The following station was at East Winch, which was provided with two platforms and a passing loop. Although there had briefly been an intermediate station between them, the next station for most of the line's existence was at Narborough and Pentney. This was the terminus of the partially completed line when it opened in 1846, and was equipped with two platforms and a large canopy.

The next station was Swaffham, where there was a branch line service to Watton and Thetford. The route then passed through Sporle (closed 1850), Dunham, Fransham, Wendling and Scarning (closed 1850) before arriving at Dereham on the line between Wymondham and Fakenham.

== Locomotives ==
The L&DR was initially operated by eight 2-2-2 passenger engines and two 0-4-2 goods engines, all of which being coke burners. The first four were delivered in 1846, with the remaining locomotives being delivered in 1847. The two goods locomotives arrived in 1848.

Number & Name	Description	Builder	Delivered	Scrapped
1 'Eagle'	2-2-2	Sharp Brothers of Manchester	1846	July 1875
2 'Vulture'	2-2-2	Sharp Brothers of Manchester	1846	June 1867
3 'Ostrich'	2-2-2	Sharp Brothers of Manchester	1846	January 1870
4 'Falcon'	2-2-2	Sharp Brothers of Manchester	1846	September 1868
5 'Hawk'	2-2-2	Sharp Brothers of Manchester	1847	October 1869
6 'Kite'	2-2-2	Sharp Brothers of Manchester	1847	October 1869
7 'Raven'	2-2-2	Sharp Brothers of Manchester	1847	March 1870
8 'Heron'	2-2-2	Sharp Brothers of Manchester	1847	January 1870
13 'Lion'	0-4-2	Sharp Brothers of Manchester	1848	-
14 'Tiger'	0-4-2	Sharp Brothers of Manchester	1848	-

== Present day ==
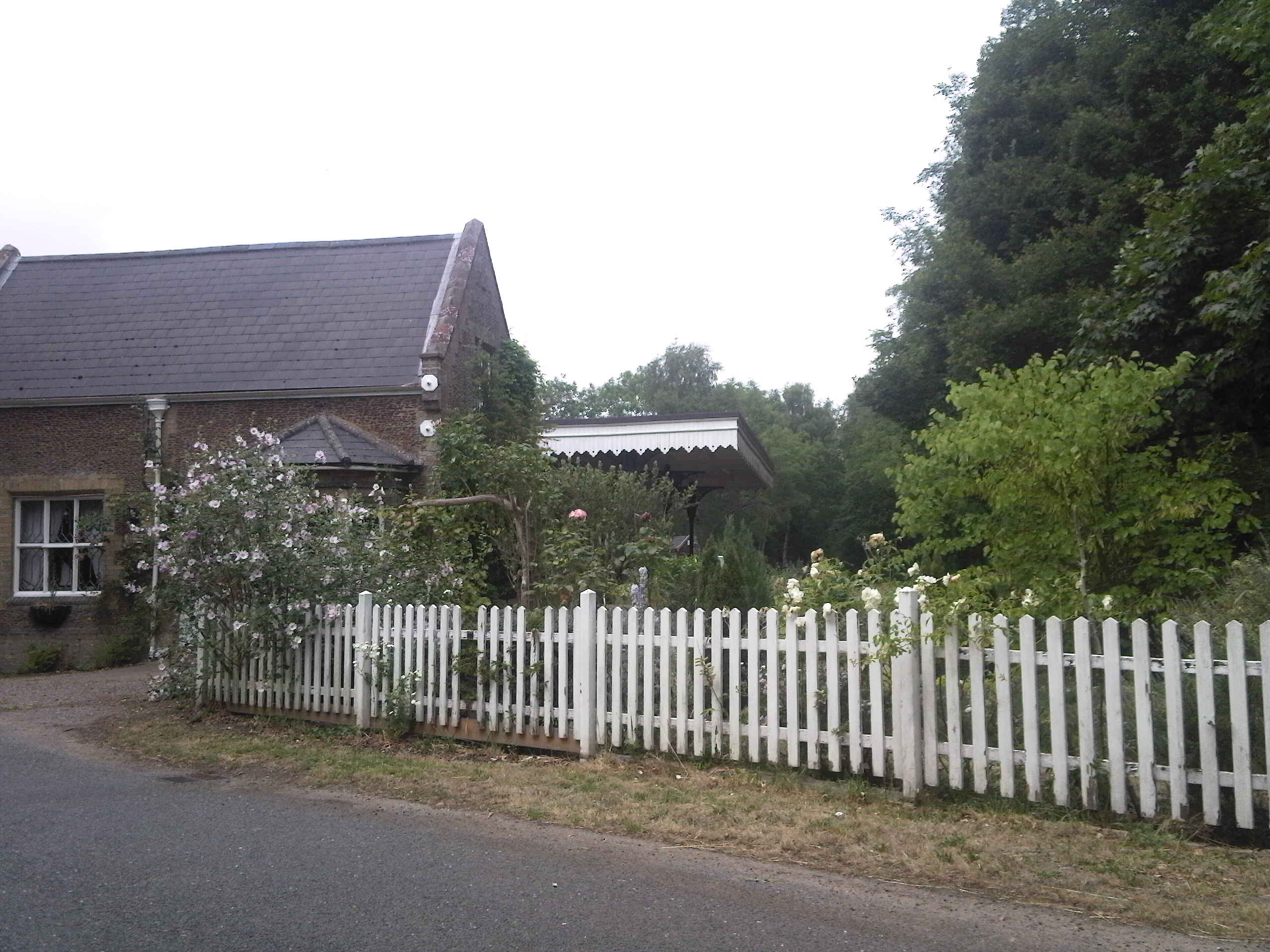
Narborough and Pentney in 2009.

The majority of the route remains unobstructed. All of the later stations, other than Wendling, remain in good order, and large sections of the route remain in transport use as roadways and drives. While track remains between King's Lynn and Middleton, the remainder has been lifted and the section of line between Dereham and Wendling has been claimed by the A47 road.

Most stations survive as private residences, although Swaffham's large yard and junction has been redeveloped as an industrial estate, with the station building surviving in community use. Dunham station was used as a museum for a number of years, although this has now closed. Fransham still has a short section of track and some rolling stock in what is now a private garden, and the route into Dereham has been partially redeveloped for housing and an inner link road. Dereham station itself survives as the headquarters for the Mid-Norfolk Railway.

In January 2019, Campaign for Better Transport released a report identifying the line which was listed as Priority 2 for reopening. Priority 2 is for lines that require further development or a change in circumstances (such as housing developments).
