= East Anglian Railways =

English railway company (1847–1852)

East Anglian Railways Act 1847
- Act of Parliament
- Parliament of the United Kingdom
- Long title: An Act for consolidating the Lynn and Ely, the Ely and Huntingdon, and the Lynn and Dereham Railway Companies into One Company, to be called "The East Anglian Railways Company."
- Citation: 10 & 11 Vict. c. cclxxv

Dates
- Royal assent: 22 July 1847

Other legislation
- Repealed by: Great Eastern Railway Act 1862

Status: Repealed

Text of statute as originally enacted

The East Anglian Railways was an English railway company that operated in East Anglia from 1847 to 1852.

East Anglian Railways Act 1851
- Act of Parliament
- Parliament of the United Kingdom
- Long title: An Act for amending the Acts relating to the East Anglian Railways.
- Citation: 14 & 15 Vict. c. ci

Dates
- Royal assent: 24 July 1851

Other legislation
- Repealed by: Great Eastern Railway Act 1862

Status: Repealed

Text of statute as originally enacted

The company was formed on 22 July 1847 by the East Anglian Railways Act 1847 (10 & 11 Vict. c. cclxxv) which authorised the merger of three railways: the Lynn and Dereham Railway, the Lynn and Ely Railway, and the Ely and Huntingdon Railway.

The company soon found itself in financial difficulties and, on the verge of bankruptcy in June 1850, its property was taken over by the receiver. The receiver leased the EAR to the Great Northern Railway for 60% of the receipts. The GNR had running powers over the Eastern Counties Railway line between Peterborough, March and Wisbech (opened 1847). Unfortunately, they had not applied for running rights over the line that linked the ECR and EAR stations at Wisbech and the ECR refused access so that the passengers had to change stations by horse-drawn omnibus. This, together with shareholder opposition within the GNR and EAR, led the GNR to withdraw from the arrangement.

Eastern Counties and East Anglian Railways Act 1852
- Act of Parliament
- Parliament of the United Kingdom
- Long title: An Act to enable the Eastern Counties Railway Company to use the East Anglian Railways, and to empower the Eastern Counties Railway Company and the East Anglian Railways Company to enter into and carry into effect Agreements for certain Objects therein mentioned; and for other Purposes.
- Citation: 15 & 16 Vict. c. cviii

Dates
- Royal assent: 17 June 1852

Other legislation
- Repealed by: Great Eastern Railway Act 1862

Status: Repealed

Text of statute as originally enacted

This left the way clear for the Eastern Counties Railway to take over operation of the EAR, which it did so, effective from 1 January 1852. This arrangement was ratified by the Eastern Counties and East Anglian Railways Act 1852 (15 & 16 Vict. c. cviii) and continued until the company was absorbed by the ECR in 1862 along with a number of other lines to form the Great Eastern Railway.
