= Shernborne =

Civil parish in Norfolk, England

Coordinates: 52.86182°N 0.54451°E

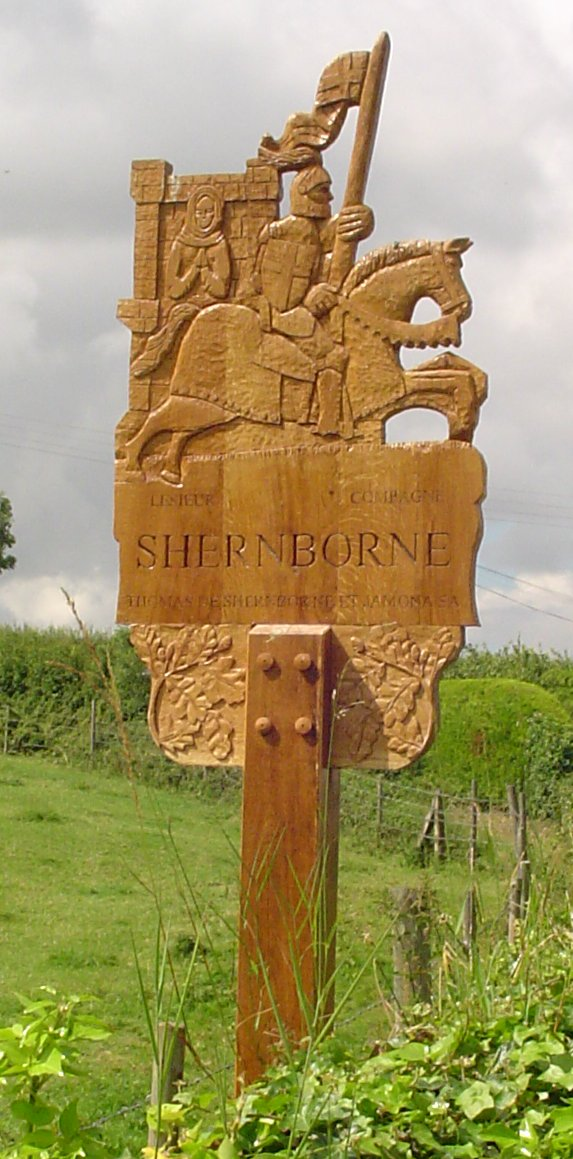
- Signpost in Shernborne

- Location within Norfolk
- Area: 5.63 km^{2} (2.17 sq mi)
- Population: 59
  - Density: 10/km^{2} (26/sq mi)
- OS grid reference: TF713324
- Civil parish: Shernborne
- District: King's Lynn and West Norfolk
- Shire county: Norfolk
- Region: East
- Country: England
- Sovereign state: United Kingdom
- Post town: KING'S LYNN
- Postcode district: PE31
- Police: Norfolk
- Fire: Norfolk
- Ambulance: East of England

Shernborne is a civil parish in the English county of Norfolk. It covers an area of 5.63 km^{2} (2.17 sq mi) and had a population of 59 in 24 households at the 2001 census. The population remained less than 100 at the 2011 Census and is included in the civil parish of Ingoldisthorpe. For the purposes of local government, it falls within the district of King's Lynn and West Norfolk.

The villages name means 'dung stream'.

Together with the villages of West Newton, Flitcham, Wolferton, Babingley, Anmer, and Sandringham itself, Shernborne forms a part of the Sandringham Estate owned personally by the King. Properties belonging to the estate are not restricted to these villages. In total there are properties in 13 surrounding villages, let to people living and working locally. The village social and bowls club was shut by the Sandringham Estate several years ago and was used as a Brass Bed Showroom. It is now used as a Wood burning stove showroom.

George VI, Queen Elizabeth and Princess Margaret attended the morning service at St. Peter and St. Paul in Shernborne on 28 January 1951. It was the first time since 1898 that the royal family had worshipped at the church.

== Notes ==
http://kepn.nottingham.ac.uk/map/place/Norfolk/Shernborne
