= Sandringham =

Sandringham can refer to:

== Places ==
=== Australia ===
- Sandringham, New South Wales, a suburb of Sydney
- Sandringham, Queensland, a rural locality
- Sandringham, Victoria, a suburb of Melbourne
  - Sandringham railway line
  - Sandringham railway station
  - Electoral district of Sandringham

=== Other countries ===
- Sandringham, Newfoundland and Labrador, Canada
- Sandringham, New Zealand, New Zealand
- Sandringham, Gauteng, a suburb of Johannesburg, South Africa
- Sandringham, Norfolk, England, UK
  - Sandringham House, one of the private residences of the British monarch

== Other uses ==
- HMS Sandringham, the name of a number of Royal Navy ships
- Sandringham College, in Melbourne, Australia
- Sandringham Football Club, an Australian rules football club in Melbourne, Australia
- Sandringham School, in St Albans, England
- Short Sandringham, a civilian version of the Short Sunderland flying boat

== See also ==
- Sandringham Hotel (disambiguation)
- Sandringham Summit, a 2020 meeting to discuss the future of the Duke and Duchess of Sussex
- Sandringham time, the idiosyncratic timekeeping at the royal estate under Edward VII
