= River Babingley =

River in northwest Norfolk, England

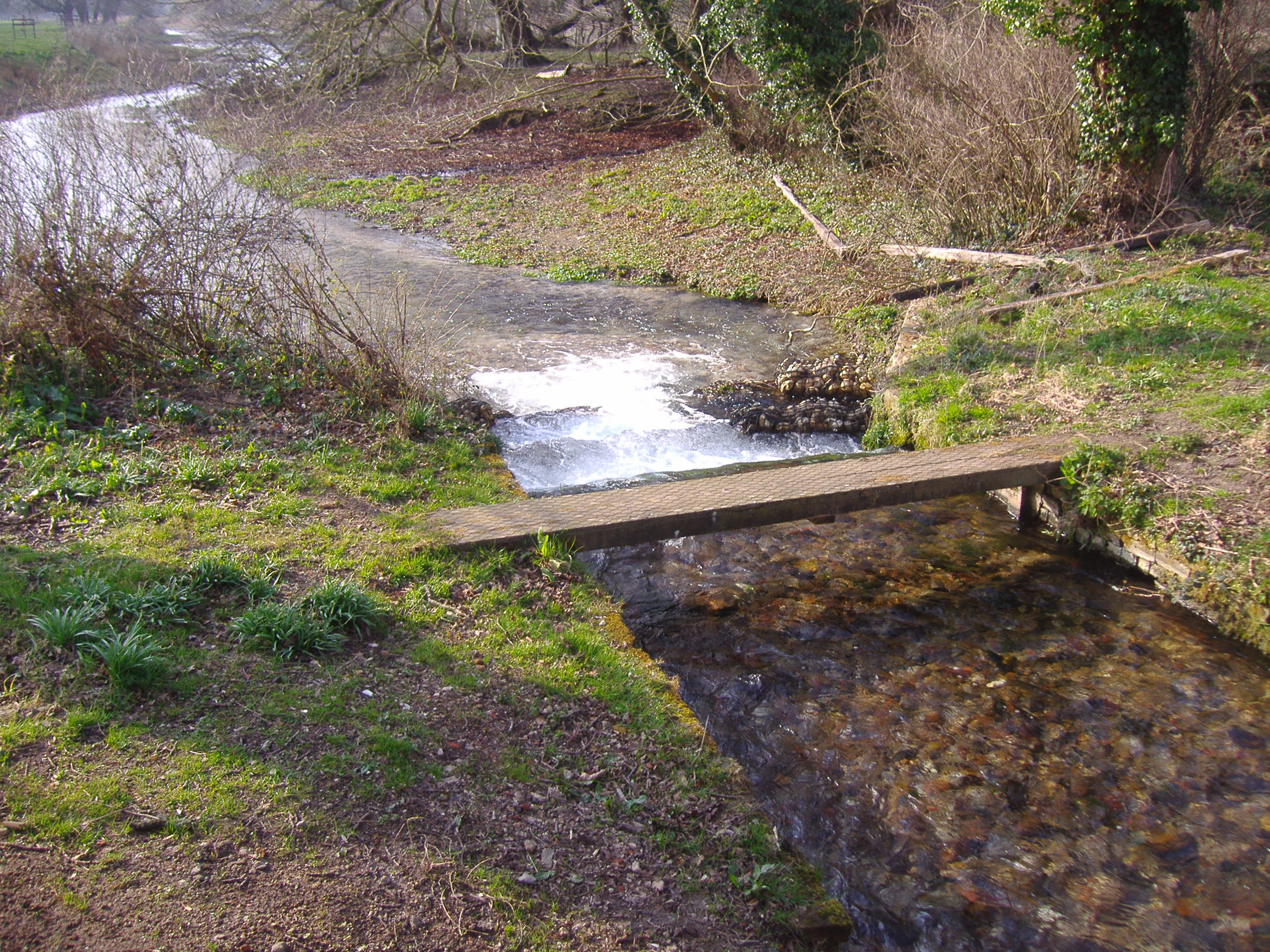
- River Babingley at Hillingdon Park

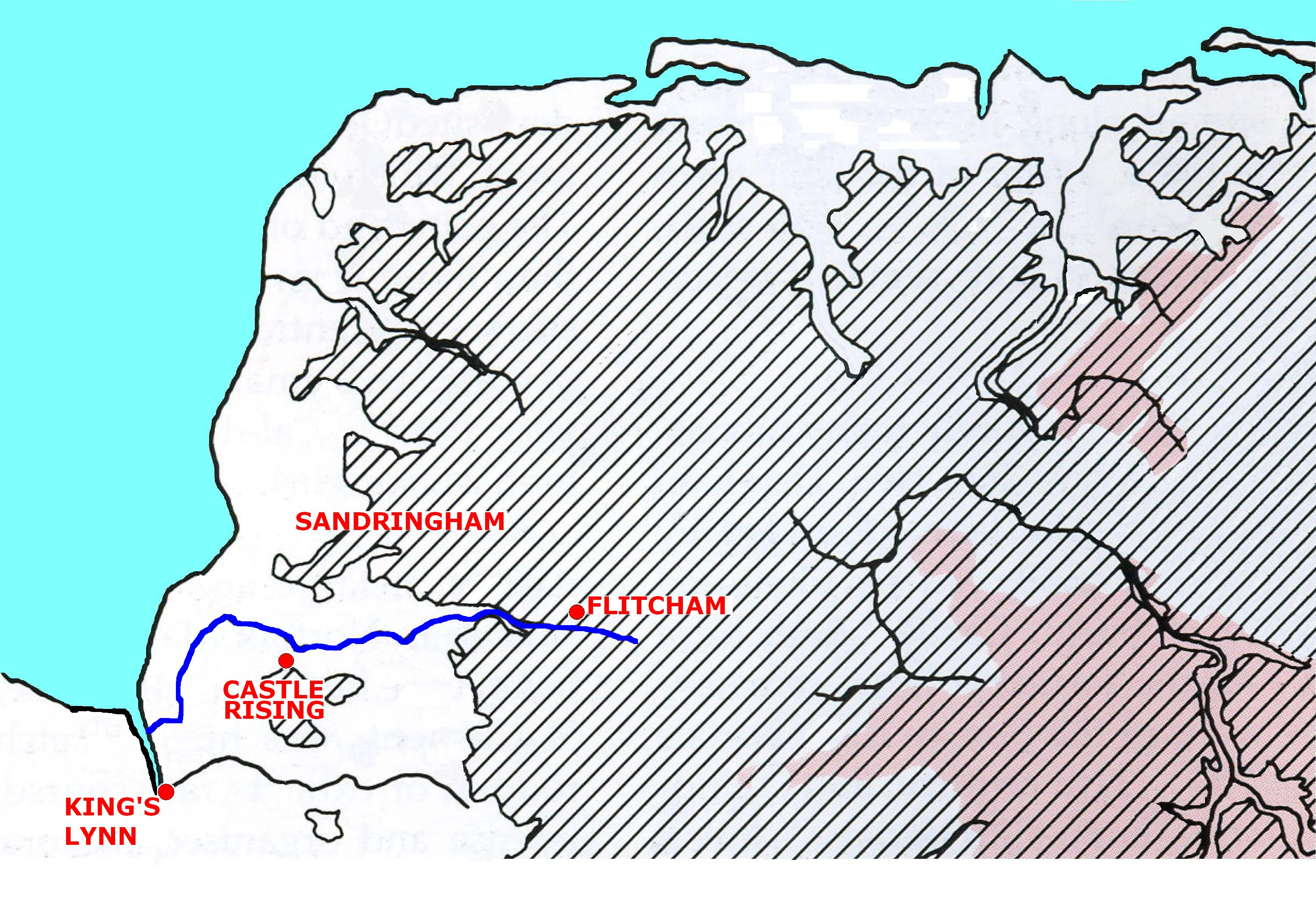
- River Babingley within west Norfolk

Location
- Country: England
- County: Norfolk
- Region: East of England
- District: King's Lynn and West Norfolk

Physical characteristics
- Source: In the village of Flitcham, Norfolk
- Mouth: Wootton Marsh, joins the Lynn channel of the River Great Ouse
  - coordinates: 52°47′6″N 0°22′28″E
- Length: 12.2 mi (19.6 km)

Basin features
- Tributaries
  - left: River Cong

The River Babingley is a chalk stream and minor river in the northwest of Norfolk in England. It runs 12.2 miles (19.6 km) from its source at Flitcham to the River Great Ouse at Wootton Marshes where it terminates.

== Course of the river ==
The Babingley rises in Further Back Wood, east of the village of Flitcham, close to Abbey Farm. Its source is at a height of 25 metres (82 ft). A watermill once stood on the river bank, but traces of it are long gone; the watercourse and the millpond are all that remain.

From here the river runs through a gentle sloped valley westwards and passes under the B1153 road and into Hillington Park. There is a tributary spring in a meadow on the Hillington side of Pond Farm, at Congham. This tributary of the river is called the River Cong, flowing through the woods and over an impressive waterfall, where in the past it powered all the machinery within the Congham Oil Mill. The Cong then flows on under the A148 and joins the Babingley close by the Gatton Waters caravan site. After Hillington Park the river flows into the lake that served another long-gone watermill that stood close to Hillington Hall The now increased force of water once powered the large waterwheel at what, years ago was known as West Newton Paper Mill. It changed over from making paper to grinding corn which lasted up until a few years after the last war. From the lake the river runs through a wooded valley out of the Park and into the countryside south of the royal estate of Sandringham. The banks of the river along this stretch are very wooded. Just past Hillington, the river passes the northern edge of a lake that has been used as a camping and caravan site.

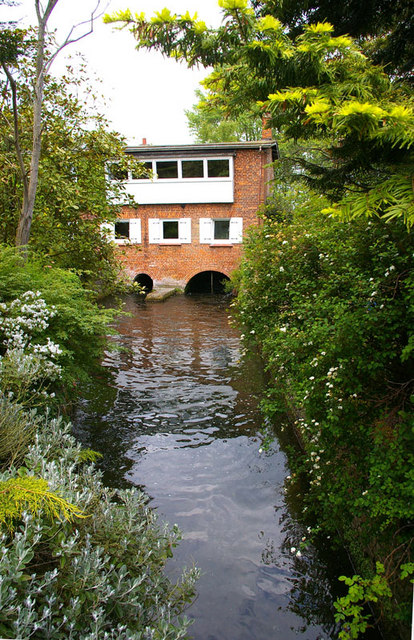
Water mill on the Babingley at West Newton, reduced and converted for residential use

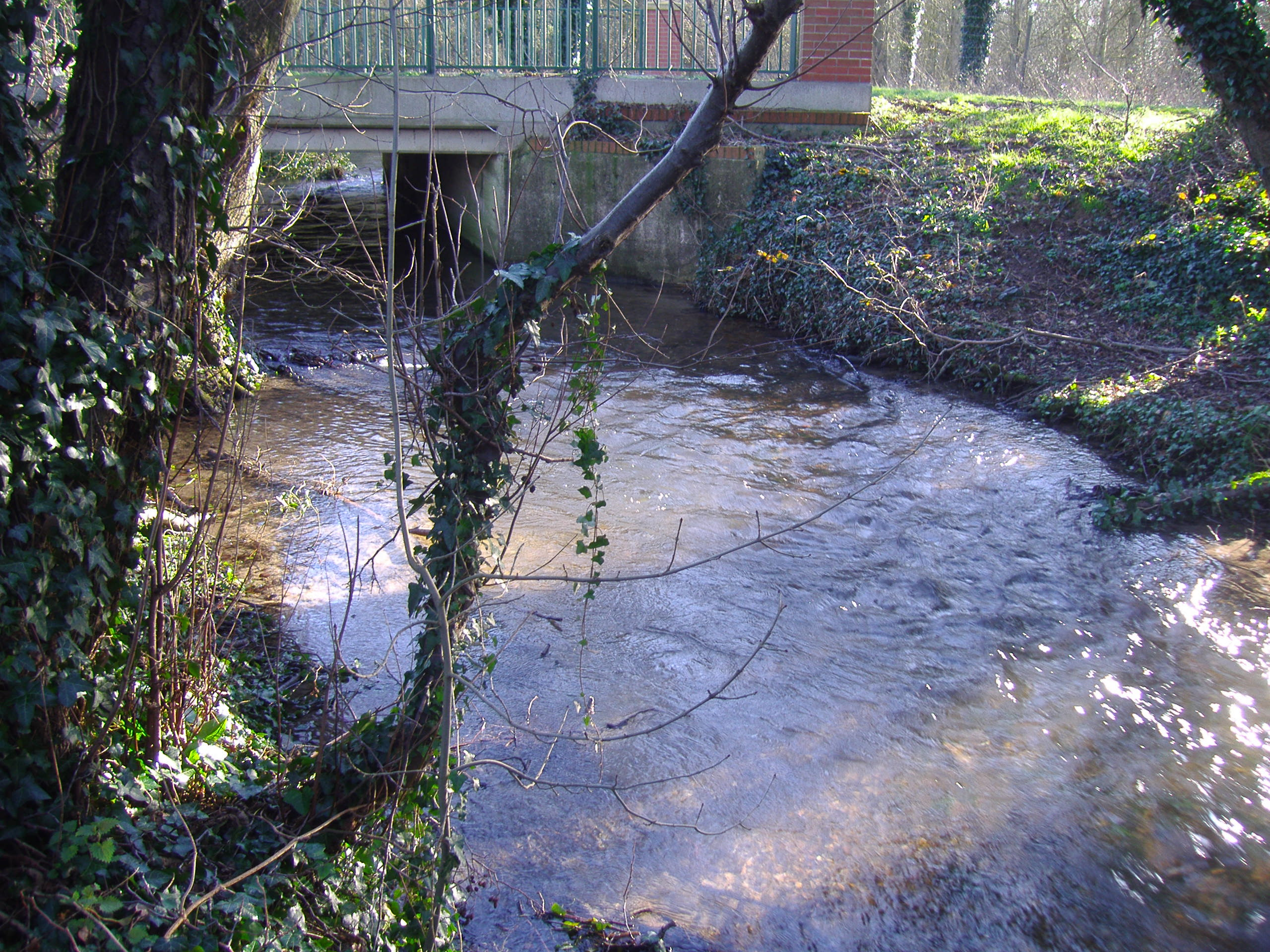
The B1440 Bridge over the River Babingley

The river continues westward skirting the northern edge of a large Forestry Commission plantation and south of Sandringham. At the end of the plantation there once was Babingley Watermill; again, no traces survive.

The river passes under the A149 road and skirts around the north of the village Castle Rising, where it passes under Babingley Bridge. In the fields on the other side of the bridge was the deserted medieval village of Babingley; the ruins of the Church of St Felix can be seen.

The river now crosses into fen and marshland and passes under the disused railway bed of the Lynn and Hunstanton Railway that ran from King's Lynn to Wolferton and once carried many members of the royal family on their way to Sandringham. The river now meanders in a northerly direction towards The Wash. It then switches into a man-made course that directs it southward through Wootton Marsh towards Vinegar Middle where the river finally runs into the river Great Ouse estuary at Lynn Channel.

== Saint Felix and the river Babingley ==
In the hamlet of Babingley, near the river, Felix of Burgundy is said to have landed c.630 AD to introduce Christianity to East Anglia. Local legend has it that after Felix's ship was wrecked while travelling up the River Babingley, he was rescued by beavers and subsequently made one of the beavers a bishop.
