= North Wootton, Norfolk =

Village in Norfolk, England

Coordinates: 52.783°N 0.433°E

North Wootton
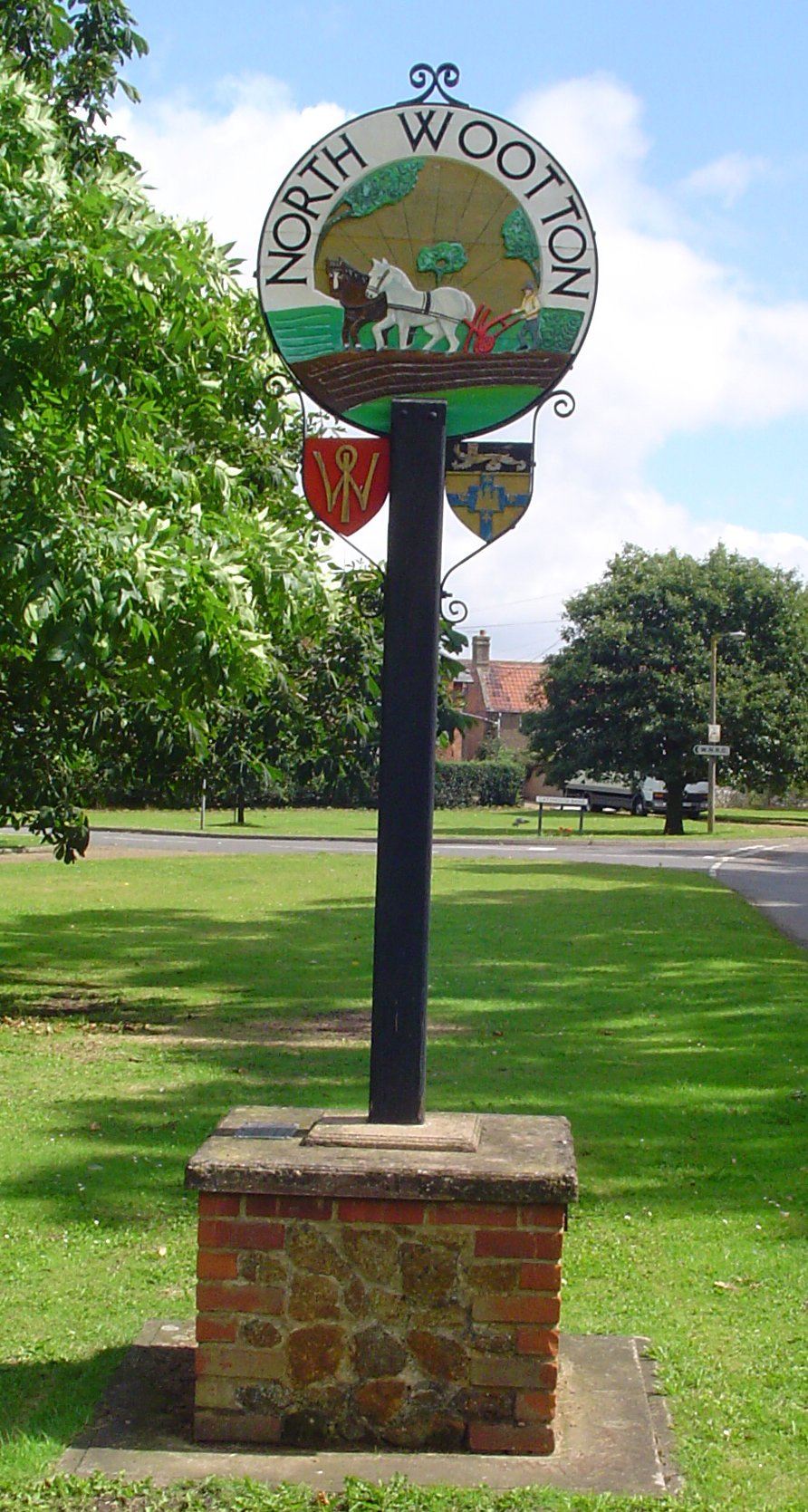
- Signpost in North Wootton

- Location within Norfolk
- Area: 32.33 km^{2} (12.48 sq mi)
- Population: 2,446 (2011)
  - Density: 76/km^{2} (200/sq mi)
- OS grid reference: TF641233
- Civil parish: North Wootton, Norfolk
- District: King's Lynn and West Norfolk
- Shire county: Norfolk
- Region: East
- Country: England
- Sovereign state: United Kingdom
- Post town: KING'S LYNN
- Postcode district: PE30
- Dialling code: 01553
- Police: Norfolk
- Fire: Norfolk
- Ambulance: East of England

North Wootton is a village, civil parish and electoral ward near the town of King's Lynn in Norfolk, England. It covers an area of 32.33 km^{2} (12.48 sq mi) and had a population of 2,387 in 935 households at the 2001 census, the population including Babingley and increasing to 2,445 at the 2011 Census. For the purposes of local government, it falls within the district of King's Lynn and West Norfolk.

It is close to the Norfolk coast, and is slightly smaller than the nearby South Wootton. North Wootton is near the village of Castle Rising, and both were owned by the Howard family, who are patrons of both parish churches. Former marshland links the village to the coast. Predominantly a farming village, the village is now experiencing a period of growth owing to new developments, holiday retreats for Londoners being the most recent of these.

The old part is located around the small village green consisting of a few houses, an old schoolhouse and a former post office (now closed).

With the arrival of the railway, a station (now disused) was built in the west of the village towards the marsh. The railway linked King's Lynn with Hunstanton. The old station waiting room is still extant, though now part of a private house. The signal box was used by the local scout group for many years, but has now been removed for future use on a heritage railway outside the local area. The station would have been familiar to the Royal family being only 2.8 miles (4.5 km) away across the River Babingley from Wolferton station which served the nearby Sandringham Estate.

The old Red Cat Hotel still stands. It is in the heart of North Wootton near the old railway. The Red Cat hotel is a traditional Norfolk Inn.

West Norfolk Rugby Club is based there, and was founded in 1925 around the time when there was only a small selection of clubs in Norfolk. The club itself was originally based in Swaffham, but was later moved during the early 1930s to the Dukes Head in King’s Lynn until WW2. At the end of the war the club reformed and moved to North Wootton, where it used the stables at the Red Cat hotel for changing facilities. West Norfolk Rugby Club has continued, and now has a youth section.

There is only one school — North Wootton Academy.

All Saints Church is a Grade II listed building, designed by Anthony Salvin in 1852. The parish is part of the Anglican Benefice of the Church in the Woottons, led by the Rector, the Revd. Canon James Nash.

== Wootton Picnic in the Park ==
In the summer of 2012, North Wootton hosted the event "North Wootton Picnic in the Park" — a free music festival that attracted over 4000 people. The park site is maintained, and funded by North and South Wootton parish councils. The picnic raises funds for extras on the park.

It was originally set up to mark the Diamond Jubilee of Elizabeth II. However, due to the popularity of the event, it was considered that it should become an annual event. Local band Jimmy Rockit was the main headline of the show, with other local and non-local bands also performing, such as Robbie Williams tribute act Dan O'Dwyer, Jessie's Ghost, Genuine Fake, Martin's Folly, and Springwood Big Band. The event also included a fairground, dog show, charity stalls, dance displays, gymnastic display and a laser quest game.
