= Flitcham, Norfolk =

Village in Norfolk, England

Coordinates: 52.81°N 0.56°E

Flitcham
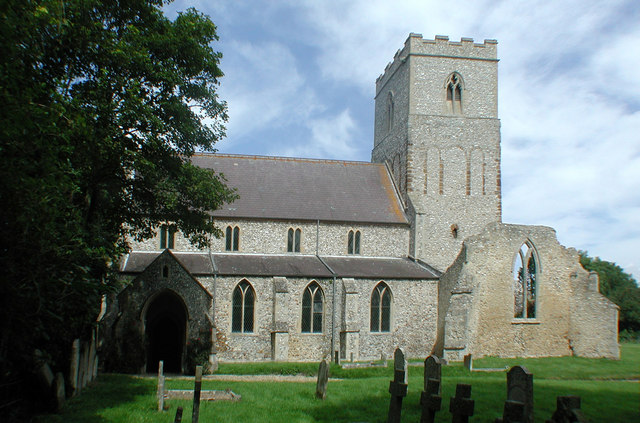
- St Mary's Church

- Location within Norfolk
- Area: 4.37 sq mi (11.3 km^{2})
- Population: 260 (2021 census)
  - Density: 59/sq mi (23/km^{2})
- OS grid reference: TF7226
  - London: 112 miles (180 km)
- Civil parish: Flitcham with Appleton
- District: King's Lynn and West Norfolk
- Shire county: Norfolk
- Region: East
- Country: England
- Sovereign state: United Kingdom
- Post town: KING'S LYNN
- Postcode district: PE31
- Dialling code: 01485
- Police: Norfolk
- Fire: Norfolk
- Ambulance: East of England
- UK Parliament: North West Norfolk

Flitcham is a village and former civil parish in the English county of Norfolk. The village is located 7.1 miles (11.4 km) north-east of King's Lynn and 33 miles (53 km) north-west of Norwich, along the River Babingley.

Together with the villages of West Newton, Shernborne and Anmer, Flitcham forms part of the Sandringham Estate of the royal family.

== Etymology ==
Flitcham's name is of Anglo-Saxon origin and derives from the Old English for a village or settlement where 'flitches' of bacon were cured. There is, however, an alternate local theory that Flitcham's name derives from Felix-ham as the site of Saint Felix's original monastery after he arrived in East Anglia in the 7th century.

== History ==
In 1948, the site of a Roman villa was excavated close to Denbeck Wood, within the parish. After excavation, the villa was found to have glazed windows, a tessellated floor and a small courtyard flanked by other buildings from the same period. Further artefacts, including coins, pottery and metalwork dating from the 3rd and 4th centuries, have been discovered close to the site and across the parish. Another possible Roman building has been identified close to the course of the River Babingley. In addition, the Denbeck Wood excavations also led to the discovery of several Anglo-Saxon artefacts including brooches, pottery and several fittings.

In the Domesday Book of 1086, Flitcham is listed as a settlement of 88 households in the hundred of Freebridge. In 1086, the village was divided between the East Anglian estates of Bishop Odo de Bayeux, William de Warenne and Roger Bigod. The survey lists the value of Flitcham as 4 mills, a church, 3 acres (12,000 m^{2}) of meadow, pannage for 27 swine, 3 cows, 1 beast for carriage and 180 sheep. In the Domesday Book, the size of woodland was normally indicated by the number of swine in a wood.

During the First World War, many local men joined the 1/5th Battalion of the Norfolk Regiment. In 1915, the unit was sent to Gallipoli and first saw action at Suvla Bay. On 21 August the unit attacked the Ottoman positions and subsequently found themselves encircled and then eliminated. Six Flitcham men were killed on 21 August 1915 in this attack. These events were dramatised in the 1999 TV drama All the King's Men starring David Jason.

Appleton House, built in the 1860s, was a residence for Haakon VII of Norway and his wife, Maud of Wales, during visits to England, with the future Olav V being born in the house. During the Second World War, Appleton House was the residence of the Norwegian monarchy in exile, and for this reason a sophisticated air-raid shelter was attached to the house.

== Geography ==
According to the 2021 census, Flitcham with Appleton has a population of 260 people which shows a decrease from the 276 people listed in the 2011 census.

Flitcham lies along the course of the River Babingley and the B1153, between Narborough and Brancaster.

The eastern boundary of the parish is discernible by Peddars Way, a long-distance footpath between Knettishall and Holme-next-the-Sea.

== St Mary's Church ==
Flitcham's parish church is dedicated to Saint Mary and dates from the 14th century. St Mary's is located within the village on Church Road and has been Grade II listed since 1960.

St Mary's was restored in the Victorian era under the direction of the future King Edward VII, taking many furnishings, including a font, from St Mary Magdalene Church in nearby Sandringham.

== Governance ==
Flitcham is part of the electoral ward of Massingham with Castle Acre for local elections and is part of the district of King's Lynn and West Norfolk.

The village's national constituency is North West Norfolk which has been represented by the Conservative's James Wild MP since 2010.

== War memorial ==
Flitcham War Memorial is a stone obelisk atop a square plinth adorned with slate on each face, and stands along the side of the B1153. The memorial was unveiled in May 1920 and lists the following names for the First World War:

Rank	Name	Unit	Date of death	Burial/Commemoration
LCpl.	William Mickleborough	8th Bn., Border Regiment	31 Jul. 1916	Thiepval Memorial
LCpl.	William C. Grimes	1/5th Bn., Norfolk Regiment	12 Sep. 1915	Haydarpaşa Cemetery
LCpl.	Charles Hunter	1/5th Bn., Norfolk Regt.	21 Aug. 1915	Helles Memorial
LCpl.	George H. Williamson	7th Bn., Norfolk Regt.	13 Oct. 1915	Loos Memorial
Dvr.	William J. Smith	2 Coy., Army Service Corps	8 Mar. 1915	Greenwich Cemetery
Pte.	Leonard Thwaites	1st Bn., Bedfordshire Regiment	9 Oct. 1917	Tyne Cot
Pte.	Allan Bridges	2nd Bn., Bedfordshire Regt.	16 Aug. 1917	St Mary's Churchyard
Pte.	Ernest Rix	2nd Bn., Bedfordshire Regt.	8 May 1918	Tyne Cot
Pte.	Sidney Rayner	9th Bn., East Surrey Regiment	27 Mar. 1918	Pozières Memorial
Pte.	Frederick Bridges	1st Bn., Essex Regiment	27 Jan. 1917	Thiepval Memorial
Pte.	William Rudley	1st Bn., Essex Regt.	13 Aug. 1915	Helles Memorial
Pte.	George H. Seaman	1st Bn., Norfolk Regt.	20 Oct. 1914	Le Touret Memorial
Pte.	Leonard A. Bridges	1/5th Bn., Norfolk Regt.	21 Aug. 1915	Helles Memorial
Pte.	Charles E. Grimes	1/5th Bn., Norfolk Regt.	18 Nov. 1915	7th Field Ambulance Cem.
Pte.	Thomas Grimes	1/5th Bn., Norfolk Regt.	19 Apr. 1917	Jerusalem Memorial
Pte.	William J. Humphrey	1/5th Bn., Norfolk Regt.	21 Aug. 1915	Helles Memorial
Pte.	Walter W. Mindham	1/5th Bn., Norfolk Regt.	19 Apr. 1917	Gaza War Cemetery
Pte.	Robert J. Overman	1/5th Bn., Norfolk Regt.	14 May 1917	Hadra War Cemetery
Pte.	Arthur R. Beckett	7th Bn., Norfolk Regt.	20 Mar. 1916	Loos Memorial
Pte.	Henry E. Broadwater	1st Bn., Queen's Royal Regiment	13 Apr. 1918	Ploegsteert Memorial

The following names were added after the Second World War:

Rank	Name	Unit	Date of death	Burial/Commemoration
Pte.	Joseph D. Searle	5th Bn., Beds and Herts Regt.	14 Dec. 1942	Kanchanaburi War Cemetery
Pte.	Percy W. Bix	7th Bn., Royal Norfolk Regiment	11 Jun. 1940	Dunkirk Memorial
