= Dersingham Bog =

English nature reserve

Coordinates: 52.83°N 0.48°E

- Site of Special Scientific Interest
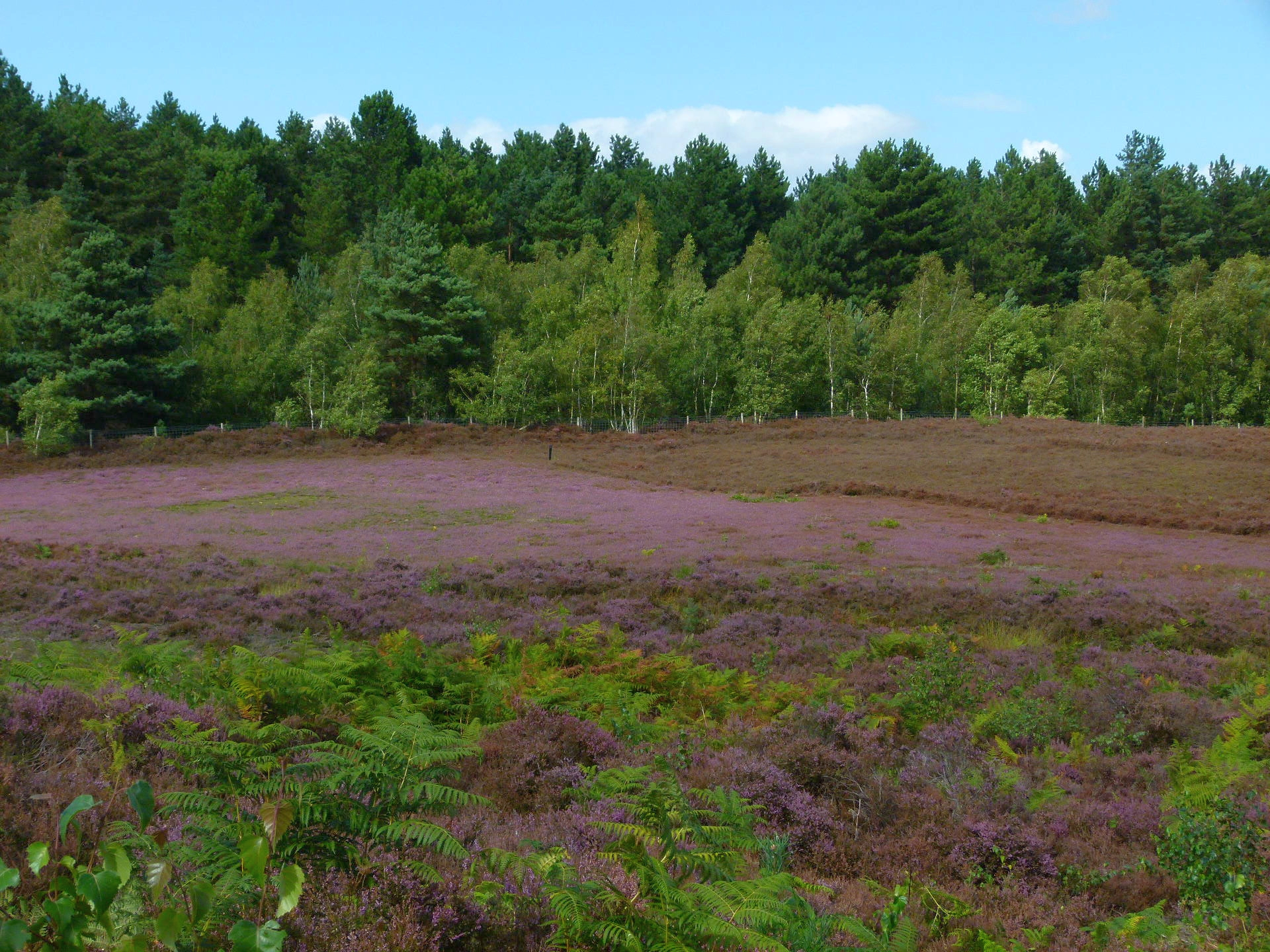
- Location of Dersingham Bog.
- Area of search: Norfolk, England
- Grid reference: TF 673 288
- Interest: Biological; Geological
- Area: 159.1 hectares (393 acres)
- Notification date: 1986
- Location map: Magic Map

Designations

Ramsar Wetland
- Official name: Dersingham Bog
- Designated: 12 September 1995
- Reference no.: 751

Dersingham Bog is a 159.1-hectare (393-acre) biological and geological Site of Special Scientific Interest in Norfolk, England. It is a Nature Conservation Review site, Grade 2, a National Nature Reserve and a Ramsar site It is part of the Norfolk Coast Area of Outstanding Natural Beauty, and the Roydon Common & Dersingham Bog Special Area of Conservation Part of it is a Geological Conservation Review site.

== Location ==
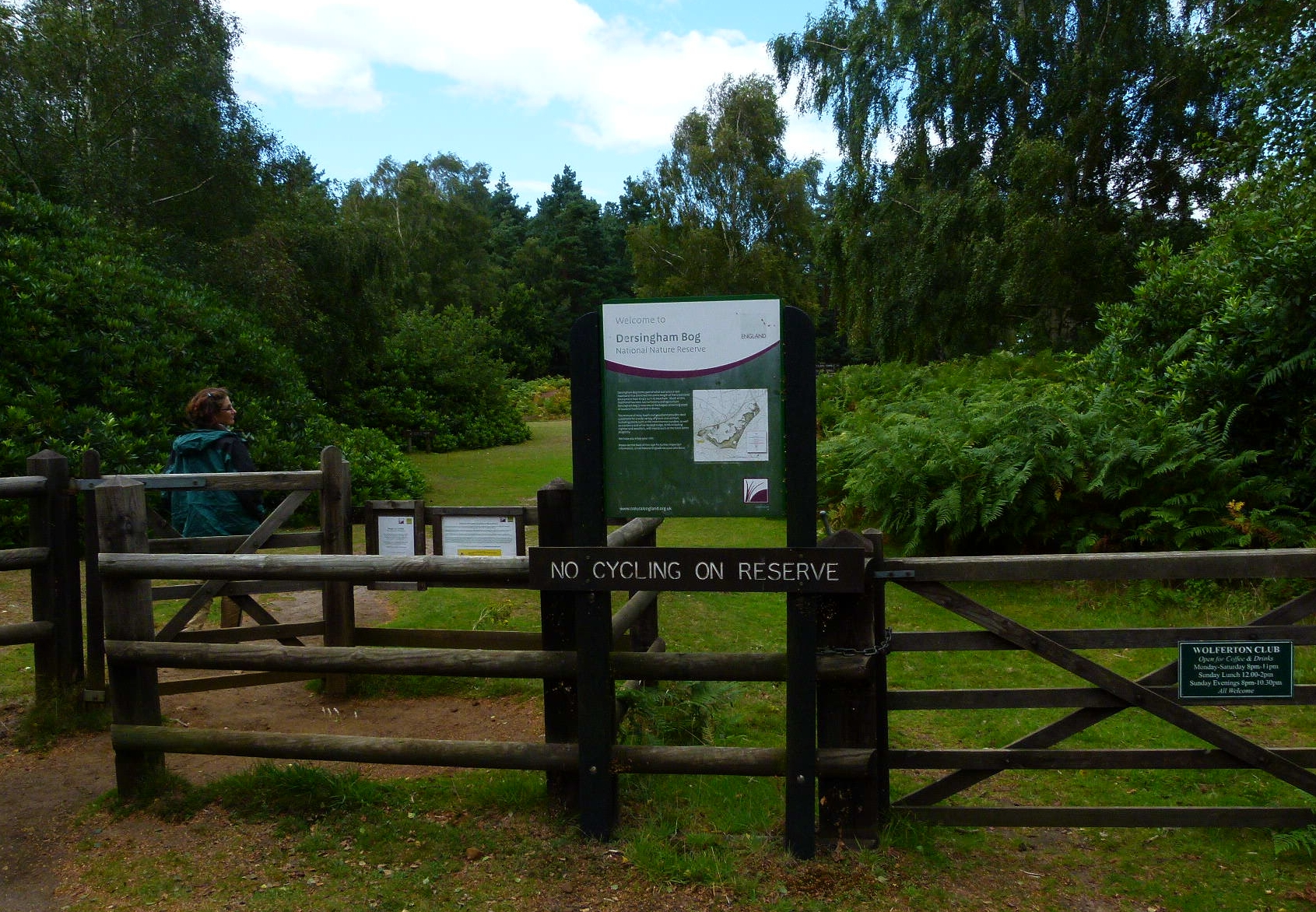
Entrance to the reserve

Dersingham Bog is near the West Norfolk Villages of Dersingham and Wolferton and is one of the few remaining wilderness areas left in this part of Norfolk which is otherwise dominated by intensive agriculture. The Reserve is part of the Sandringham Royal Estate.

== Geology ==
The site lies on the north west Norfolk Greensand escarpment. It is notable for a rock dating from the Lower Cretaceous Period known as 'Dersingham Formation' which has been important in understanding the geology of the region.

== Habitats and wildlife ==
Dersingham Bog contains three distinct habitats, mire, heath and woodland. Acid valley mire is found over much of the low-lying parts of the reserve where the ground is waterlogged for most of the year. Dersingham Bog contains the largest remaining example of this kind of habitat in East Anglia.

The mire's make-up of wet acid peat makes it ideal conditions for some rare and diverse species of plants such as bog asphodels (Narthecium ossifragum), round-leaved sundew (Drosera rotundifolia), white beaked sedge (Rhynchospora alba) and cranberry. The mire also has some rare insects such as the black darter dragonfly (Sympetrum danae) and moths such as the light knot grass (Acronicta menyanthidis). In the dark it is possible to see glowworms. The mire lies on shallow peat and is bordered on one side by a steep escarpment containing large areas of dry heath and woodland which marks the edge of an ancient coastline. The woodland at Dersingham is quite recent and contains Scots pine, oak, sweet chestnut, sycamore and birch. The woodland glades attract birds such as redpoll, crossbill, long-eared owl, tree pipit, woodlark, shelduck, nightjar, and sparrowhawk.

== Access ==
All of Dersingham is open access and there are many well-marked routes to follow which provide easy access for visitors to explore this wilderness. There are car parks at Wolferton and Scissors Cross, payment via RingGo app.

== Management ==
The reserve is in the management of Natural England.

== Memorial to John Denver ==
Dersingham Bog is the location of a bench which commemorates the life of American singer-songwriter and environmentalist John Denver. It was placed there by the Friends of John Denver UK in September 2006.
