= Wood Farm =

Coordinates: 52°49′22.59″N 0°27′20.89″E

- Interactive map of the Wood Farm area
- Former names: Marsh Farm

General information
- Type: Cottage
- Location: Sandringham Estate, Wolferton, Norfolk
- Owner: Charles III
- Landlord: Charles III
- Affiliation: British royal family

Wood Farm is a farmhouse on the British royal family's Sandringham estate in Norfolk, England. Historically occupied by members of the Royal Family and their guests, the house was a long favourite of Elizabeth II. From his retirement in 2017 until his death in 2021, the house was home to Prince Philip, Duke of Edinburgh.

== Design and location ==
Wood Farm is a five-bedroom cottage located in a secluded part of the Sandringham Estate, overlooking the sea. It has been described as a "comfortable open beamed cottage two miles from the ‘big house’". The house is half a mile from the Wolferton railway station and is located near the stables and pheasant shooting grounds. Prince Philip, Duke of Edinburgh, reportedly decorated the walls with his own art and redesigned the kitchen and bedrooms.

== History and occupants ==
In 1904, the farmhouse was associated with the nearby Marsh Farm. King George V and Queen Mary sent their youngest son, Prince John, who suffered from epileptic seizures, to reside at Wood Farm in 1917. He tended to a garden alongside a flock of chickens, occasionally receiving Queen Alexandra as a visitor before his death in 1919. The cottage was subsequently rented out for a number of years, including to James Ansell, the royal family's physician, before his retirement in the 1960s.

Elizabeth II and her family began using Wood Farm in 1967. Prince Philip chose the cottage for the family or guests to stay in without the huge staff or costs presented by the main house. Staff have been reported to not wear uniforms at the cottage. The Queen was also described to have cooked and done the dishes while in residence. Charles III, when Prince of Wales, began to host shooting parties at Wood Farm during his college years, and continued to use it as a country retreat in adulthood.

The cottage is also a guest house for visitors who want "complete privacy". Diana, Princess of Wales, stayed at the farm with the Queen during a shooting party before her engagement. Catherine Middleton stayed at the cottage during a visit to Sandringham early in her relationship with Prince William. The couple continued to host shooting parties at Wood Farm after their marriage.

After his retirement, Prince Philip, Duke of Edinburgh, lived at Wood Farm. He was often visited by Queen Elizabeth II, and reportedly ran a truffle farm on the grounds of the cottage.

Andrew Mountbatten-Windsor, following his departure from Royal Lodge, moved to Wood Farm in February 2026, staying there temporarily until the refurbishment of Marsh Farm, also on the Sandringham Estate, was completed. In the same month, Andrew was arrested at Wood Farm on suspicion of misconduct in public office following the release of the Epstein files.
