= North Wootton railway station =

Former railway station in Norfolk, England

Coordinates: 52.7920°N 0.4278°E

North Wootton
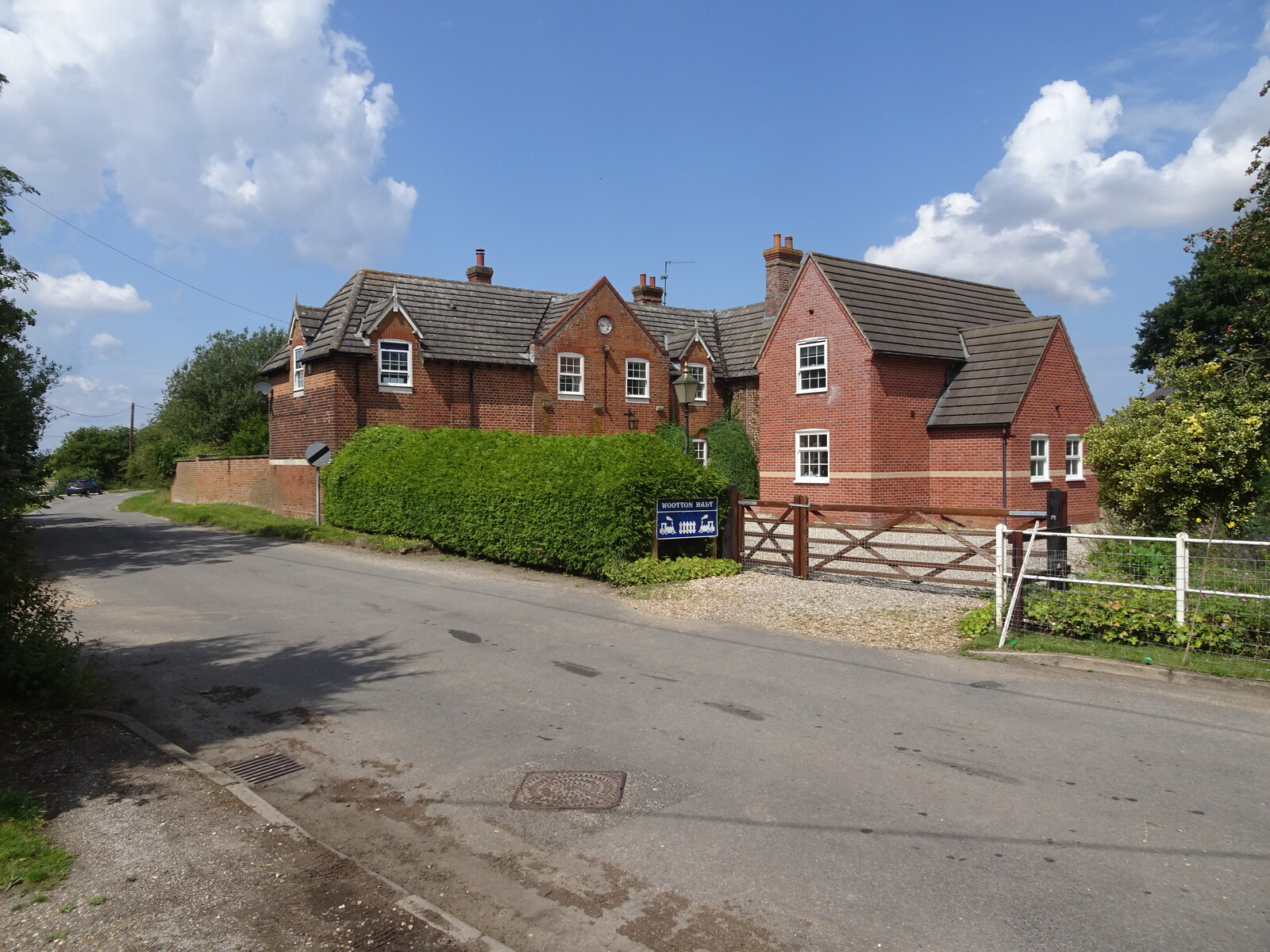
- The site of the station in 2021

General information
- Location: North Wootton, King's Lynn and West Norfolk; England
- Grid reference: TF637244
- Platforms: 2

Other information
- Status: Disused

History
- Original company: Lynn and Hunstanton Railway
- Pre-grouping: Great Eastern Railway
- Post-grouping: London and North Eastern Railway; Eastern Region of British Railways

Key dates
- 3 October 1862: Opened as Wootton
- July 1869: Renamed North Wootton
- 5 May 1969: Closed
Location

North Wootton (originally Wootton) was a railway station on the King's Lynn to Hunstanton line which opened in 1862 to serve the village of North Wootton on the outskirts of King's Lynn in Norfolk, England. The station closed along with the line in 1969.

== History ==
From opening the Lynn and Hunstanton Railway was operated by the Great Eastern Railway for a share of the gross receipts.

On 3 August 1863 a passenger train ran into a bullock near North Wootton station. Five passengers were killed as a result with the poor state of the rolling stock being partially to blame.

On 3 September 1885 the 4:45 pm Lynn-Hunstanton train derailed 1 mile (1.6 km) south of North Wootton injuring six passengers.

From opening North Wootton had a single track but in 1885 a passing loop and second platform were added. A signal box was provided at this date. However, further increases in traffic saw the line doubled in 1899 and a new signal box was provided in 1901.

In 1923 following the grouping North Wootton became a London and North Eastern Railway station.

Following nationalisation of the railways in 1948 the station fell under the aegis of British Railways (Eastern Region).

Diesel Multiple Unit operation superseded steam operation in December 1958.

The goods yard was closed on 28 December 1964 although the sidings were not removed until December 1965. Further rationalisation saw the line singled, the level crossing automated and the signal box closed on 2 April 1967. Despite this rationalisation the line was doomed, and closed completely on 5 May 1969.

== Description ==
As the first intermediate station on the line, North Wootton was situated some 3 miles 19 chains (5.2 km) from King's Lynn. Much like Dersingham, it was equipped with an up and down platform - the main station buildings on the up side and smaller waiting facilities on the down side. The main building was L-shaped, comprising a two-storey stationmaster's residence together with an adjoining booking office; the building was a hybrid of the original Lynn & Hunstanton Railway architecture plus later modifications introduced by the Great Eastern Railway at the turn of the twentieth century. At the south end of the platforms lay a minor road which the line crossed on the level, with crossing gates being controlled by a standard Great Eastern signal box.

Preceding station	Disused railways	Following station
King's Lynn; Line closed, station open	British Rail; Eastern Region; King's Lynn to Hunstanton branch	Wolferton; Line and station closed

== Present day ==
The station buildings survived closure. The station itself, along with platforms, is now a private residence. The goods area is now the headquarters of North Wootton's Scouts and Guides. In May 2008 the old signal box was transferred to Leeming Bar on the Wensleydale Railway in North Yorkshire as part of a £50,000 renovation project which was backed by a £22,700 heritage lottery grant.
