= Babingley =

Village in Norfolk, England

Coordinates: 52.809°N 0.484°E

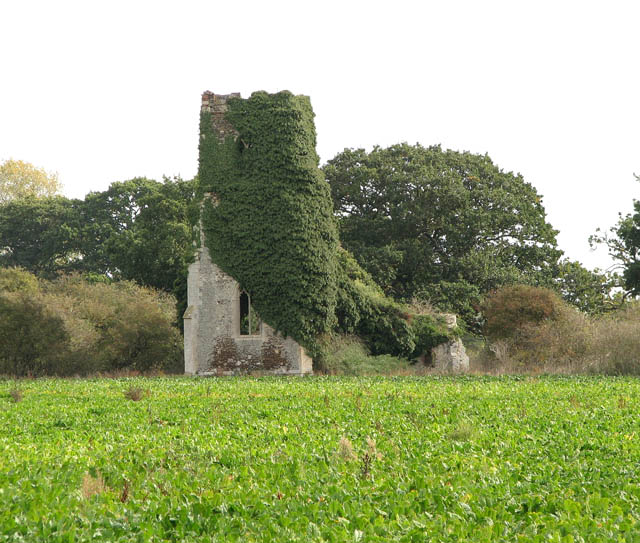
- Ruin of St Felix's parish church

- Location within Norfolk
- OS grid reference: TF675264
- Civil parish: Sandringham
- District: King's Lynn and West Norfolk
- Shire county: Norfolk
- Region: East
- Country: England
- Sovereign state: United Kingdom
- Post town: King's Lynn
- Postcode district: PE30
- Dialling code: 01485
- Police: Norfolk
- Fire: Norfolk
- Ambulance: East of England
- UK Parliament: North West Norfolk

Babingley is a hamlet and former civil parish, now in the parish of Sandringham, in the King's Lynn and West Norfolk district, in the county of Norfolk, England, about 1 mile (1.6 km) northwest of Castle Rising and 5 1/2 miles (9 km) north-north-east of King's Lynn. In 1931 the parish had a population of 91. On 1 April 1935 the parish was abolished and merged with Sandringham.

The place-name 'Babingley' is first attested in the Domesday Book of 1086, where it appears as Babinghelea. The name means 'the clearing of Babba's people'.

The modern village is a small group of houses along the A149 road linking King's Lynn and Hunstanton. The site of the abandoned village is in fields west of the main road, marked by the ruin of St Felix's parish church.

== Saint Felix ==
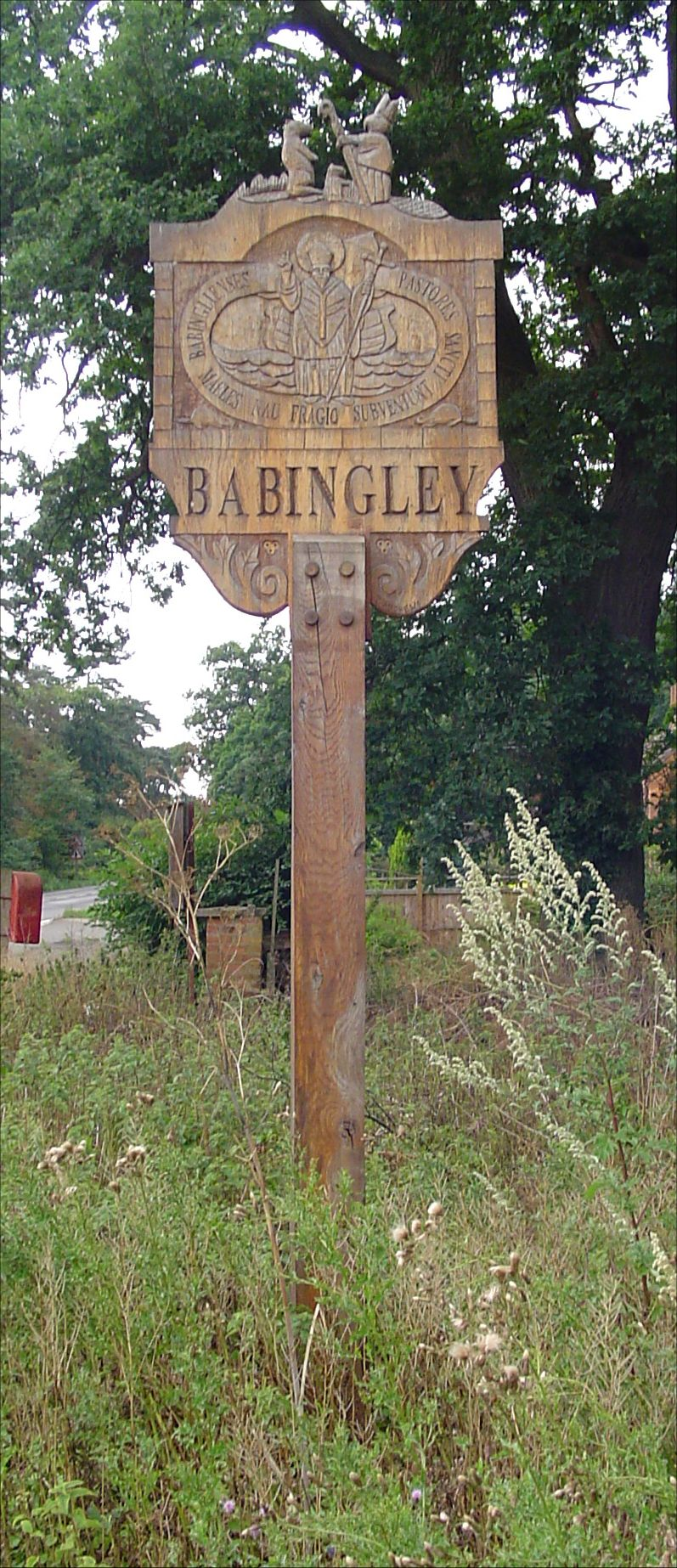
Village sign, showing at top the legend of St Felix and the beaver which he consecrated as a bishop

Babingley is said to be where St Felix of Burgundy, Apostle to the East Angles, landed in Britain in about AD 615. The Wuffingas, the East Anglian royal family, invited Felix to evangelise their kingdom. Babingley is remote from the former royal capital at Rendlesham, but Felix is said to have arrived here via the River Babingley after his ship took shelter from a violent storm. He made his way to Canterbury where Honorius, Archbishop of Canterbury, ordained him as a bishop at the request of King Sigebert of East Anglia in about 630. St Felix made his cathedral on the other side of the kingdom at Dommoc, possibly the modern Walton.

A legend claims that Felix was shipwrecked on the River Babingley but a colony of beavers saved him from drowning, so in gratitude Felix consecrated the chief beaver as a bishop. The village sign records the legend, showing a beaver wearing a bishop's mitre, ministering to other beavers.

== Manor ==
The Domesday Book of 1086 records a manor of Babingley with one carucate of land, and another three carucates held by tenants.

== Churches ==
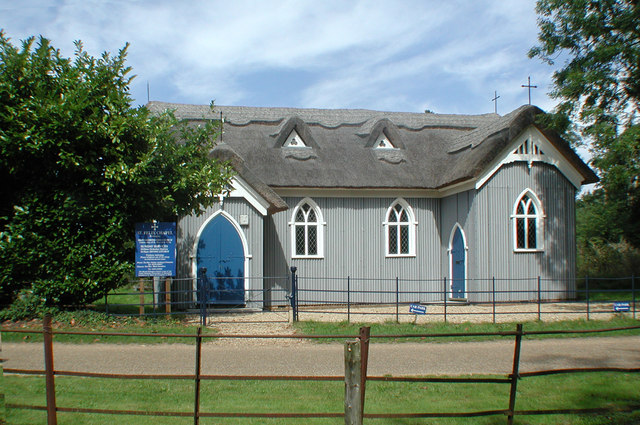
1880 "tin tabernacle" mission church

Babingley has had two Church of England churches: a 14th-century parish church and a 19th-century mission church.

The 14th-century parish church of St Felix was used for worship until the 19th century and is now a ruin. It is in a field near the River Babingley and is now part of the nearby Sandringham estate. It is said to be the site of the first Christian church to be built in Norfolk. The surviving ruin, however, is mainly 14th-century Decorated Gothic, with a 15th-century south porch built of brick. The chancel was described as "decayed" in a survey of 1602 and "dilapidated" by 1752. The last rector, James Sharp, was appointed in 1732. According to Nikolaus Pevsner there is a record of an attempt to repair the church in 1849. A photograph taken in 1949 shows it still partially roofed, but the building is now entirely roofless.

The church consisted of a nave, north and south aisles with two-bay arcade, chancel, and west tower. The chancel was taller and higher than the nave. While the church was still in use the north aisle was demolished and its arcade blocked. The chancel arch has been bricked up and a Decorated Gothic window from the south side of the chancel re-set in the brickwork.

In 1880 a new mission church of SS Mary and Felix was built by the main road. It has a timber frame clad with corrugated iron. Unusual among "tin tabernacles", this one has a thatched roof.

After the new church was consecrated the 14th-century one was abandoned. Its condition has significantly declined since the 1970s, and what remains now is the 14th-century tower and empty shell of the nave and south aisle. It is one of several church ruins in west Norfolk that the artist John Piper painted in the early 1980s. Since then ivy has grown over much of the ruin, including all of the tower. It is a Grade I listed building and a scheduled monument.

== Butler's Cross ==
Butler's Cross is the base and broken shaft of a medieval stone boundary cross. It is on a traffic island at the junction where the minor road to West Newton meets the A149 main road. Its name is derived from that of the de Boteler family, who held the manor of West Hall, Babingley from the mid-13th-century.

== See also ==
- List of lost settlements in Norfolk

== Sources ==
- Batcock, Neil (1992). Ruined and Disused Churches Of Norfolk. East Anglian archaeology.
- Blomefield, Francis (1808). "Babingley". An Essay Towards A Topographical History of the County of Norfolk. Vol. 8. London: W Miller. pp. 347–352.
- Pevsner, Nikolaus (1962). North-West and South Norfolk. The Buildings of England. Vol. 2. Harmondsworth: Penguin Books. p. 80. ISBN 0-14-071024-8.
- Powicke, F. Maurice; Fryde, EB (1961). Handbook of British Chronology (2nd ed.). London: Royal Historical Society.
- Walsh, Michael (2007). A New Dictionary of Saints: East and West. London: Burns and Oates. p. 201. ISBN 0-86012-438-X.
