= Congham =

Village in Norfolk, England

Coordinates: 52.78187°N 0.53992°E

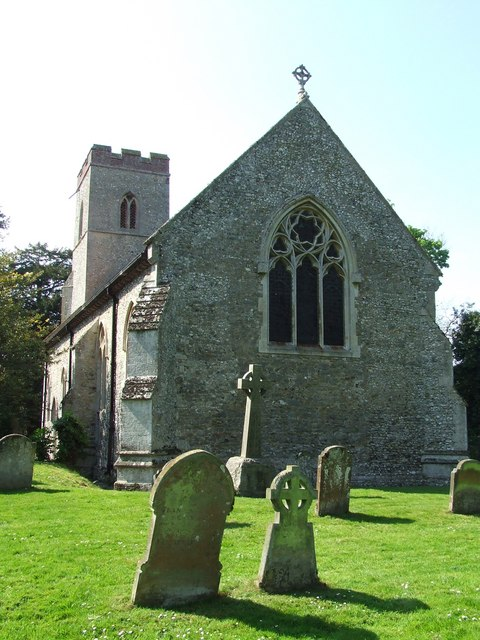
- St. Andrew's Church

- Location within Norfolk
- Area: 11.70 km^{2} (4.52 sq mi)
- Population: 236 (2021)
  - Density: 20/km^{2} (52/sq mi)
- OS grid reference: TF714235
- Civil parish: Congham
- District: King's Lynn and West Norfolk
- Shire county: Norfolk
- Region: East
- Country: England
- Sovereign state: United Kingdom
- Post town: KING'S LYNN
- Postcode district: PE32
- Dialling code: 01485
- Police: Norfolk
- Fire: Norfolk
- Ambulance: East of England
- UK Parliament: North West Norfolk

Congham is a village and civil parish in the English county of Norfolk.

It is situated some 6 miles (10 km) east of the town of King's Lynn and 34 miles (55 km) west of the city of Norwich.

== History ==
Congham's name is of Anglo-Saxon origin and derives from the Old English for a farmstead or homestead built upon a mound.

In the Domesday Book of 1086, Congham is recorded as a settlement of 54 households located in the hundred of Freebridge. The village was divided between the estates of William de Warenne and Berner the Bowman.

Congham Oil Mill was built in the village in 1797 and was used to process whale carcasses into oils and other products. The whales were brought to Congham from King's Lynn.

In 1973, remains of a Roman villa were discovered close to Congham. Several artefacts were recovered from the site and are now exhibited in King's Lynn Museum.

Since the 1960s, Congham has hosted an annual snail race.

== Geography ==
According to the 2021 census, the population of Congham is 236 people which shows a decrease from the 241 people listed in the 2011 census.

The River Cong rises close to the village and joins the River Babingley close to Hillington.

The A148, between King's Lynn and Cromer, and the B1153, between Narborough and Brancaster.

== St. Andrew's Church ==
Congham's parish church is dedicated to Saint Andrew and dates from the thirteenth century. St Andrew's is located on Saint Andrew's Lane and has been Grade II listed since 1960.

St Andrew's was heavily restored in the Victorian era and boasts a thirteenth-century Purbeck Marble font, as well as a pulpit produced by the Royal Woodcarving Workshop associated with nearby Sandringham House.

== Congham Railway Bridge ==
From the late 19th century, the Congham area was served by the Lynn & Fakenham Railway, later part of the Midland and Great Northern Joint Railway. A railway bridge at Congham was designed by the M&GNJR engineer William Marriott, pioneering an innovative system of reinforced concrete components and blockwork. In 2021, National Highways infilled the bridge with hundreds of tonnes of aggregate and concrete, but without planning permission. The railway route had been identified as part of a proposed footpath and cycleway between King’s Lynn and Fakenham, and in January 2023 King's Lynn and West Norfolk Borough Council demanded that National Highways submit a retrospective planning application. National Highways' retrospective planning application received 280 objections.

== Notable residents ==
- Sir Henry Spelman- (1562-1641) antiquary, born in Congham.
- Thomas Norris MP- (d.1607) politician, born in Congham.
- Robert Elwes- (1819-1878) painter and traveller, lived in Congham.
- Ysabel Birkbeck- (1859-1934) toymaker and philanthropist, born in Congham.
- Henry, Baron Bellingham- (b.1955) politician and barrister, lives in Congham.

== Governance ==
Congham is part of the electoral ward of Gayton & Grimston for local elections and is part of the district of King's Lynn and West Norfolk.

The village's national constituency is North West Norfolk which has been represented by the Conservative's James Wild MP since 2010.

== War Memorial ==
Congham's war memorials are two marble plaques inside St. Andrew's Church. The memorials list the following names for the First World War:

Rank	Name	Unit	Date of death	Burial
CPO	Richard M. Smith	HMS Vanguard	9 Jul. 1917	Chatham Naval Memorial
Gnr.	William Goodburn	76th Bde., Royal Field Artillery	23 Apr. 1917	Liévin Cemetery
Pte.	Harold Coomber	6th Bn., Buffs	3 May 1917	Arras Memorial
Pte.	Edward Smith	6th Bn., Royal Dublin Fusiliers	17 Oct. 1918	Highland Cemetery
Pte.	Horace Rallison	8th Bn., Middlesex Regiment	1 Apr. 1917	Agny Cemetery
Pte.	Herbert J. Grief	2nd Bn., Norfolk Regiment	17 Apr. 1916	Basra Memorial
Pte.	Frederick Smith	9th Bn., Northumberland Fusiliers	15 Apr. 1918	Ploegsteert Memorial

And, T. A. Harper. And, the following for the Second World War:

Rank	Name	Unit	Date of death	Burial
Maj.	John H. Elwes	2nd Bn., Royal Norfolk Regiment	28 May 1940	Dunkirk Memorial
LS	Stanley R. Mason	HMS Arethusa	18 Nov. 1942	Chatham Naval Memorial
Pte.	Wilfred Utteridge	8th Bn., Royal Norfolk Regiment	14 May 1941	St. Andrew's Churchyard
