= Thomas Norris (died 1607) =

16th-century English politician

Thomas Norris (died 1607), of Congham, Norfolk, was an English politician.

He was a member (MP) of the parliament of England for Castle Rising in 1586. He married Elizabeth Guybon and they had two sons and one daughter.
