= Ysabel Birkbeck =

British ambulance driver and memoirist

Ysabel Hunter née Birkbeck (16 June, 1890–1973) was a British ambulance driver and war memoirist. Her parents were Henry Birkbeck, a London-born banker, and Ysabel Birkbeck (née Elwes), a toymaker and philanthropist. Ysabel had a privileged upbringing, which she rejected in favour of art and wartime service during both the First and Second World Wars.

== War service ==
Birkbeck saw very active service in the First World War, driving an ambulance in Russia alongside Elsie Inglis and her field hospital, attached to the First Serbian Division. In December 1915, she was in Russia as part of a solidarity effort by the British government in support of their ally. She ended up in Moldovia, and eventually was part of the volunteers of the Scottish Women's Hospitals for Foreign Service who worked to get their equipment across the Danube River near Tulcea with support from the British Armoured Car group. She was on the Romanian front from 1916 to 1917.

She was also part of the retreat from Dobruja. During the retreat, Birkbeck and other members of the Scottish Women's Hospital volunteers had nothing more than the clothes they were wearing. In her diaries, she said that witnessing the pain of the soldiers being evacuated was one memory that would stick with her for the rest of her life.

During this period, she treated both Serbian and Russian soldiers while being very close to the front lines. At one point, she was caught in the middle of an air raid near Medigidia. The incident resulted in her ambulance getting a flat tire. While she got out to fix it, her three passengers ran for cover.

She was trying to return to England in March 1917 while serving as an orderly near Petrograd. While trying to leave, she ended up getting caught in the food riots. She ended up in part of a group during a general strike that got fired upon by Cossacks and the police. Her hotel was also occupied by the military. She was there when the March 14, 1917 declaration was given by the new government, ordering everyone to return to work. Birbeck expressed surprise as the effectiveness of this command. Discussing in her diaries her time stuck in Petrograd, she expressed support for some of the ideas of the February Revolution as a potential liberalizing force in Russia.

== Diaries ==
Birbeck's diaries were originally written in pencil. Because of the lack of regular access to ink while serving near the front lines, she would explain how she got access to the ink when writing in it. Her diaries were also often written on scraps of paper, pages torn from notebooks and other irregular paper sources.

The story of her work driving ambulances can be read in Forgotten Heroines, her published illustrated diary. She recorded how the group of women, who had sailed from Liverpool in late 1916, were known as The Buffs. Mostly young daughters of wealthy families, they cut their hair and wore breeches to face danger and excitement on the Eastern Front. Her diaries also tell the story of Busta House, the home of one of the most prosperous merchants in the Shetland Islands.

Ysabel Birkbeck: diaries rel to her journey to Ceylon, China and Japan 1909 are held at the Durham University Library, Archives and Special Collections: Palace Green Section. diaries rel to travel to Japan 1909 and in Africa 1926-27 are held at the same location. Lavinia Murray created a short drama series based on Birbeck's diaries.

== Personal ==
Birkbeck was born on 16 June 1890. Ysabel and her husband had a separation and reunion in the early 1930s, however they cooperated at the refugee camps established for Basque children during the Spanish Civil War. Her husband served as an administrator in Sudan.
