= Ysabel Birkbeck (toymaker) =

- Born: Ysabel Caroline Birkbeck; 1859
- Died: 1934 (aged 74–75)
- Occupation: Toymaker
- Known for: Philanthropy

Ysabel Caroline Birkbeck née Elwes (1859–1934) was a British toymaker and philanthropist, best known as founder of the notable Westacre Dolls' House company which manufactures dolls' house furniture.

== Life ==
Born in 1859, she was the daughter of the painter and traveller Robert Elwes (1819–1878), and gentleman’s daughter Mary Frances Lucas. Ysabel Elwes was baptised in Congham, Norfolk, on 4 October 1859. On 24 February 1881, she married Henry Birkbeck, a London-born banker. The couple had seven children, including three daughters: Gillian Mary, born 1883; Judith, born 1888; and Ysabel, born 1891.

The Birkbecks were rich. In 1898, they bought West Acre estate, including the Georgian High House from the Hamond family (Ysabel was related to the Hamond family through her paternal grandmother, Susan Hamond).

Oldest daughter Gillian married Joseph Gurney Barclay in 1905. The couple lived in Cambridge for a while, entertaining undergraduates at their house on Grange Road. In February 1908 the couple set off as missionaries to Japan. They settled in Kobe, and Gillian kept a diary of their work and life (now at Durham University Library), including her dilemmas over how much to decorate her home, how to dress, and with whom to socialise.

In January 1909, Ysabel Birkbeck headed to visit her oldest daughter in Japan, taking younger daughters Judith and Ysabel along too. Younger Ysabel kept diaries recording the whole journey, including photographs and her own drawings of the scenes and people they saw (also at Durham). They arrived in time for the birth of Gillian’s son, Roderick Edward, whom Ysabel sketched “aged 18 hours”.

Gillian died on 15 May 1909, aged 26, while her mother and sisters were with her. Ysabel, Ysabel and Judith returned to Europe via Canada, arriving in Vancouver on the 1 July.

On the date of the 1911 census, Ysabel the elder is at Westacre with four of her children.

In the First World War, Ysabel and Henry’s second son, Captain Gervase William Birkbeck, was killed in the First Battle of Gaza in 1917. Their youngest daughter Ysabel Birkbeck also saw very active service in the First World War, driving an ambulance in Russia, the story of which can be read in Forgotten Heroines, her published illustrated diary.

After the First world War, Ysabel Birkbeck started to make Westacre dolls’ house furniture, including women and children from the village in the production. They used Liberty print fabrics over wire and beads, and sold their miniature sets to toy shops around the country. Beryl Watts (1906 - 2007), a Westacre villager, started working for Birkbeck while still a schoolgirl, then moved into service for the Birkbecks (her duties included going ahead to Kinloch Hourn in the Scottish Highlands to prepare the family’s holiday house). By the 1930s she was also a leading figure in the dolls’ house furniture business.

Ysabel Birkbeck died in 1934. Her husband Henry had died four years before, leaving a huge fortune.
