= HMS Sandringham =

HMS Sandringham after Sandringham, Norfolk is the name of two Royal Navy ships:

- HMS Sandringham (FY 598) taken over by the Admiralty in August 1939 and returned to her owner in 1946.
- HMS Sandringham (M2791), a minesweeper of the Ham class
