= Dersingham =

Village in Norfolk, England

Coordinates: 52.84471°N 0.50200°E

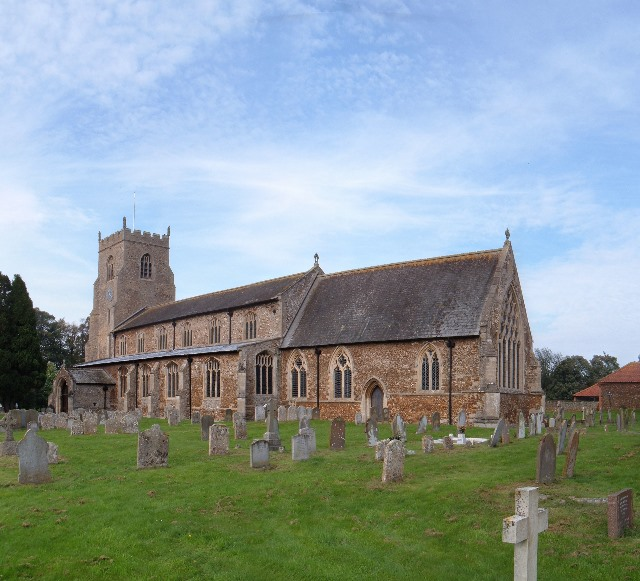
- St Nicholas' Church

- Location within Norfolk
- Area: 14.50 km^{2} (5.60 sq mi)
- Population: 4,755 (2021)
  - Density: 328/km^{2} (850/sq mi)
- OS grid reference: TF 686 304
  - London: 96 km
- Civil parish: Dersingham
- District: King's Lynn and West Norfolk
- Shire county: Norfolk
- Region: East
- Country: England
- Sovereign state: United Kingdom
- Post town: KING'S LYNN
- Postcode district: PE31
- Dialling code: 01485
- Police: Norfolk
- Fire: Norfolk
- Ambulance: East of England
- UK Parliament: North West Norfolk

Dersingham is a village and civil parish in the English county of Norfolk.

Dersingham is located 7.3 miles (11.7 km) north-east of King's Lynn and 37 miles (60 km) north-west of Norwich.

== History ==
Dersingham's name is of Anglo-Saxon origin and derives from the Old English for the village or settlement of Deorsige's people.

In the Domesday Book, Dersingham is listed as a settlement of 115 households in the hundred of Freebridge. In 1086, the village was divided between the estates of Eudo, son of Spirewic and Peter de Valognes.

In 1984, a horde of silver shillings with a silver cup was discovered in Dersingham which date from the Tudor and Stuart eras.

== Geography ==
According to the 2021 census, Dersingham has a population of 4,755 people which shows an increase from the 4,640 people listed in the 2011 census.

Dersingham is located along the A149, between King's Lynn and Great Yarmouth.

The nearby Dersingham Bog National Nature Reserve, managed by Natural England (formerly English Nature), contains habitats ranging from marshland to heathland and woodland. Birds such as the redpoll, crossbill, long-eared owl, tree pipit, sparrowhawk and nightjar can be found there.

== St Nicholas' Church ==
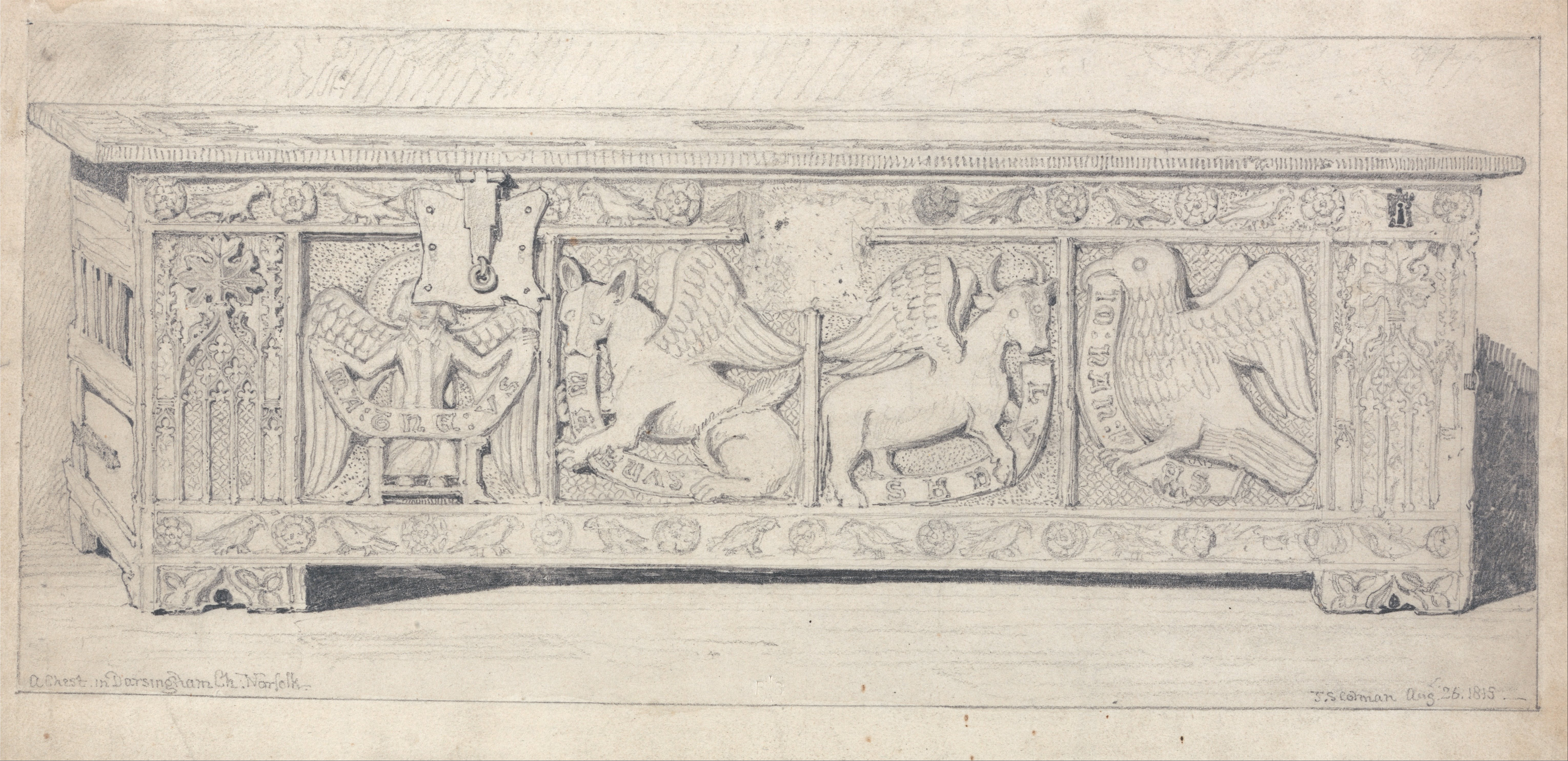
John Sell Cotman, chest in Dersingham Church (1815)

Dersingham's parish church is dedicated to Saint Nicholas and dates from the 14th century. St Nicholas' is located on Church Lane and has been a Grade I listed building since 1953.

St Nicholas' holds a good example of a 14th-century chancel with stained glass depicting Jesus, Saint Agnes and Saint Luke installed by James Powell and Sons and Charles Eamer Kempe in the early 20th century. The wooden parish chest, dating from the middle of the 14th century, is carved elaborately with the symbols of the four Evangelists; on the lid, there is part of an inscription.

== Sandringham House ==
Sandringham House, a favoured royal residence of Queen Elizabeth II and several of her predecessors, lies just to the south of Dersingham in the parish of Sandringham. The Queen visited Dersingham Infant School to mark her Diamond Jubilee in February 2012.

== Notable residents ==
- Thomas Kerrich (1748-1828) clergyman, librarian and antiquarian, born in Dersingham.
- John Dolignon (1813-1896) Norfolk and Marylebone Cricket Club cricketer, born in Dersingham.
- Arthur Harry Cross (1858-1906) chorister and composer, lived in Dersingham.
- Arthur Bryant (1899-1985) historian and writer, born in Dersingham.
- Ginger Baker (1939-2019) drummer, rented Dersingham Hall during his Baker Gurvitz Army period.
- Phil Collins (b.1951) English musician and frontman of Genesis, resident of Dersingham.
- Claire Goose (b.1975) actress, raised in Dersingham.

== Governance ==
Dersingham is an electoral ward for local elections and is part of the district of King's Lynn and West Norfolk.

The village's national constituency is North West Norfolk which has been represented by the Conservative's James Wild MP since 2010.

== War memorial ==
Dersingham War Memorial is a stone-brick obelisk on Station Road which was unveiled in 1923 and renovated in 2008. The memorial lists the following names for the First World War:

Rank	Name	Unit	Date of Death	Burial
Lt.	John W. Whitehouse	156th Coy., Royal Engineers	21 Mar. 1918	Peronne Cemetery
Sgt.	Vivian S. Wells	20th Bn., Durham Light Infantry	31 Mar. 1918	Arras Memorial
Sgt.	Albert E. Lancaster	79th Coy., Royal Garrison Artillery	16 Oct. 1918	Kirkee War Cemetery
LSgt.	Wesley E. R. Tuck	9th Bn., Norfolk Regiment	25 Oct. 1916	St Nicholas' Churchyard
LSgt.	William Cross	10th Bn., West Yorkshire Regiment	23 Apr. 1917	Arras Memorial
Cpl.	Edward Melton	10th Bn., Gordon Highlanders	7 Aug. 1915	Maroc Cemetery
Cpl.	Leonard A. Reynolds	3rd Sqn., Mounted Military Police	14 Mar. 1919	South Cemetery
Cpl.	Alfred E. Daniels	1st Bn., Norfolk Regiment	4 Jun. 1916	Faubourg Cemetery
Cpl.	Ernest Emmerson	1/5th Bn., Norfolk Regt.	12 Aug. 1915	Helles Memorial
LCpl.	Horace Reed	7th Bn., Bedfordshire Regiment	20 Mar. 1918	Noyon Cemetery
Dvr.	Albert Carter	75th Ambulance, Army Medical Corps	1 May 1918	Lijssenthoek Cemetery
Gnr.	Frederick T. Fitt	270th Bde., Royal Field Artillery	9 Jun. 1917	Hadra War Memorial
Gnr.	William Rasberry	51st Bty., Royal Garrison Artillery	28 Jun. 1917	Strand Cemetery
Pte.	John R. Green	1st Bn., Cambridgeshire Regiment	9 Aug. 1918	Ribemont Cemetery
Pte.	Hubert H. Tuck	21st (Eastern Ontario) Bn., CEF	16 Sep. 1916	Puchevillers Cemetery
Pte.	Walter Cross	8th Bn., East Yorkshire Regiment	17 Nov. 1916	Thiepval Memorial
Pte.	Robert F. Batterbee	1st Bn., Essex Regiment	16 Aug. 1917	Tyne Cot
Pte.	William Clarke	9th Bn., Essex Regt.	9 Apr. 1917	Houdain Cemetery
Pte.	Isaac Taylor	3rd Bn., Royal Fusiliers	4 Nov. 1918	Fontaine-au-Bois Cem.
Pte.	Oliver Ellwood	3rd Bn., Royal Inniskilling Fusiliers	8 Nov. 1918	St Nicholas' Churchyard
Pte.	George W. Grief	9th Bn., King's Own Royal Regiment	28 Apr. 1917	Karasouli Cemetery
Pte.	Robert H. Daniels	9th Bn., Lancashire Fusiliers	4 Oct. 1917	Tyne Cot
Pte.	A. Ernest Green	7th Bn., Leicestershire Regiment	24 Sep. 1916	Thiepval Memorial
Pte.	Edward Dawes	2nd (City) Bn., London Regiment	6 Nov. 1918	Angreau Cemetery
Pte.	Edward A. Newling	63rd Bn., Machine Gun Corps	28 Aug. 1918	Terlincthun Cemetery
Pte.	George L. Hooks	2nd Bn., Middlesex Regiment	7 Oct. 1918	Hautmont Cemetery
Pte.	Cyril J. Jarvis	1st Bn., Norfolk Regiment	4 Nov. 1917	Tyne Cot
Pte.	Charles E. Daniels	2nd Bn., Norfolk Regt.	17 Nov. 1914	Basra Memorial
Pte.	George W. Fenton	2nd Bn., Norfolk Regt.	3 Jul. 1916	Basra War Cemetery
Pte.	Herbert J. Grief	2nd Bn., Norfolk Regt.	17 Apr. 1916	Basra Memorial
Pte.	Philip Allen	1/4th Bn., Norfolk Regt.	6 Nov. 1917	El Qantara Cemetery
Pte.	William A. Bunn	1/5th Bn., Norfolk Regt.	19 Apr. 1917	Gaza War Cemetery
Pte.	Sidney Carter	1/5th Bn., Norfolk Regt.	21 Aug. 1915	Helles Memorial
Pte.	Harold F. G. Daniels	1/5th Bn., Norfolk Regt.	2 Nov. 1917	Deir al-Balah Cemetery
Pte.	Ernest Howell	1/5th Bn., Norfolk Regt.	12 Aug. 1915	Helles Memorial
Pte.	James Howell	1/5th Bn., Norfolk Regt.	19 Apr. 1917	Gaza War Cemetery
Pte.	Frederick R. Kerrison	1/5th Bn., Norfolk Regt.	21 Aug. 1915	Helles Memorial
Pte.	Robert W. Nurse	1/5th Bn., Norfolk Regt.	21 Aug. 1915	Helles Memorial
Pte.	Morris M. Walden	1/5th Bn., Norfolk Regt.	21 Aug. 1915	Helles Memorial
Pte.	George A. Rust	8th Bn., Norfolk Regt.	17 Feb. 1917	Thiepval Memorial
Pte.	E. Alfred Eastwick	23rd Bn., Northumberland Fusiliers	9 Apr. 1917	Arras Memorial
Pte.	William Lyng-Baldwin	1st Bn., South Staffordshire Regiment	3 Aug. 1917	Achiet Cemetery
Rfn.	Albert Brooks	10th (Paddington) Bn., London Regt.	9 Aug. 1918	Vis-en-Artois Memorial
Rfn.	Herbert J. Daniels	11th (Finsbury) Bn., London Regt.	24 May 1917	Arras Memorial
Spr.	Herbert E. Francis	104th Coy., Royal Engineers	27 May 1918	Arras Memorial
Spr.	Arthur W. Daw	144th Coy., R.E.	10 Apr. 1918	St Sever Cemetery
Cmn.	James Drew	SS Alnwick Castle	19 Mar. 1917	Tower Hill Memorial

And, Thomas Nurse.

== See also ==
- Dersingham railway station
