= Marsh Farm, Sandringham =

Marsh Farm
- Interactive map of the Marsh Farm area

General information
- Type: Farmhouse
- Location: Sandringham Estate, Wolferton, Norfolk
- Coordinates: 52.828930°N 0.454119°E
- Owner: Charles III
- Landlord: Charles III
- Affiliation: British royal family

Marsh Farm is a property on the Sandringham Estate in Norfolk, owned by King Charles III. It is the home, since April 2026, of Andrew Mountbatten-Windsor following his departure from Royal Lodge and his temporary relocation to Wood Farm.

== History ==
A property known as 'The Marsh Farm' on the Sandringham Estate is described briefly in the 1904 book The King's Homeland.

In early 2026, work crews were photographed at the site installing security cameras and lighting in preparation for his arrival. The area has also been added to Sandringham's no-fly zone banning aircraft and drones from flying overhead.

== Location ==
The farm is situated 2.4km west of Sandringham House, in the village of Wolferton.

== Description ==
It is a red-brick farmhouse with five bedrooms, two reception rooms, and a kitchen. The grounds include outbuildings stables and a mobile home, and the farmhouse was originally used as the residence for a working farm.
