= River Cong (Norfolk) =

River in west Norfolk, England

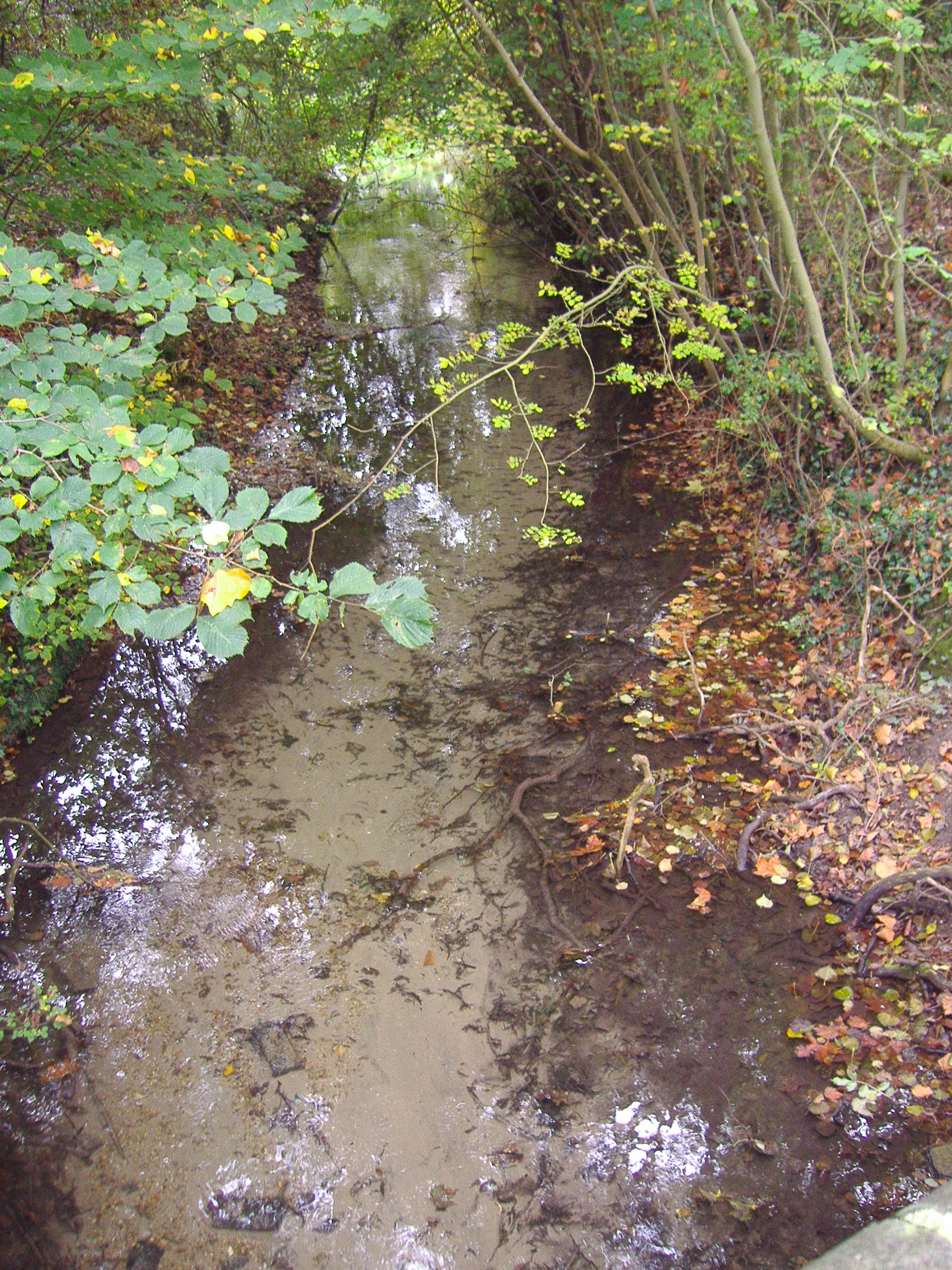
- River Cong

- Location of the river mouth within Norfolk

Location
- Country: England
- State: Norfolk
- Region: East of England
- District: King's Lynn and West Norfolk

Physical characteristics
- Source
  - location: Manor Farm, Congham
  - coordinates: 52.7865°N 0.5499°E
  - elevation: 19 m (62 ft)
- Mouth: River Babingley
  - location: west of Hillington
  - coordinates: 52.8006°N 0.5311°E
  - elevation: 13 m (43 ft)
- Length: 1.5 mi (2.4 km)

Basin features
- River system: River Babingley

The River Cong is a stream in the west of the county of Norfolk, only 1.5 miles (2.4 km) in length. It is a tributary of the River Babingley. The spring rises in a meadow pool on the Hillington side of Manor Farm, Congham. From there, it flows through the wood and over a small waterfall, where in the past it powered all the machinery within the Congham Oil Mill (grid reference TF71342475), which is now known as Congham Lodge.

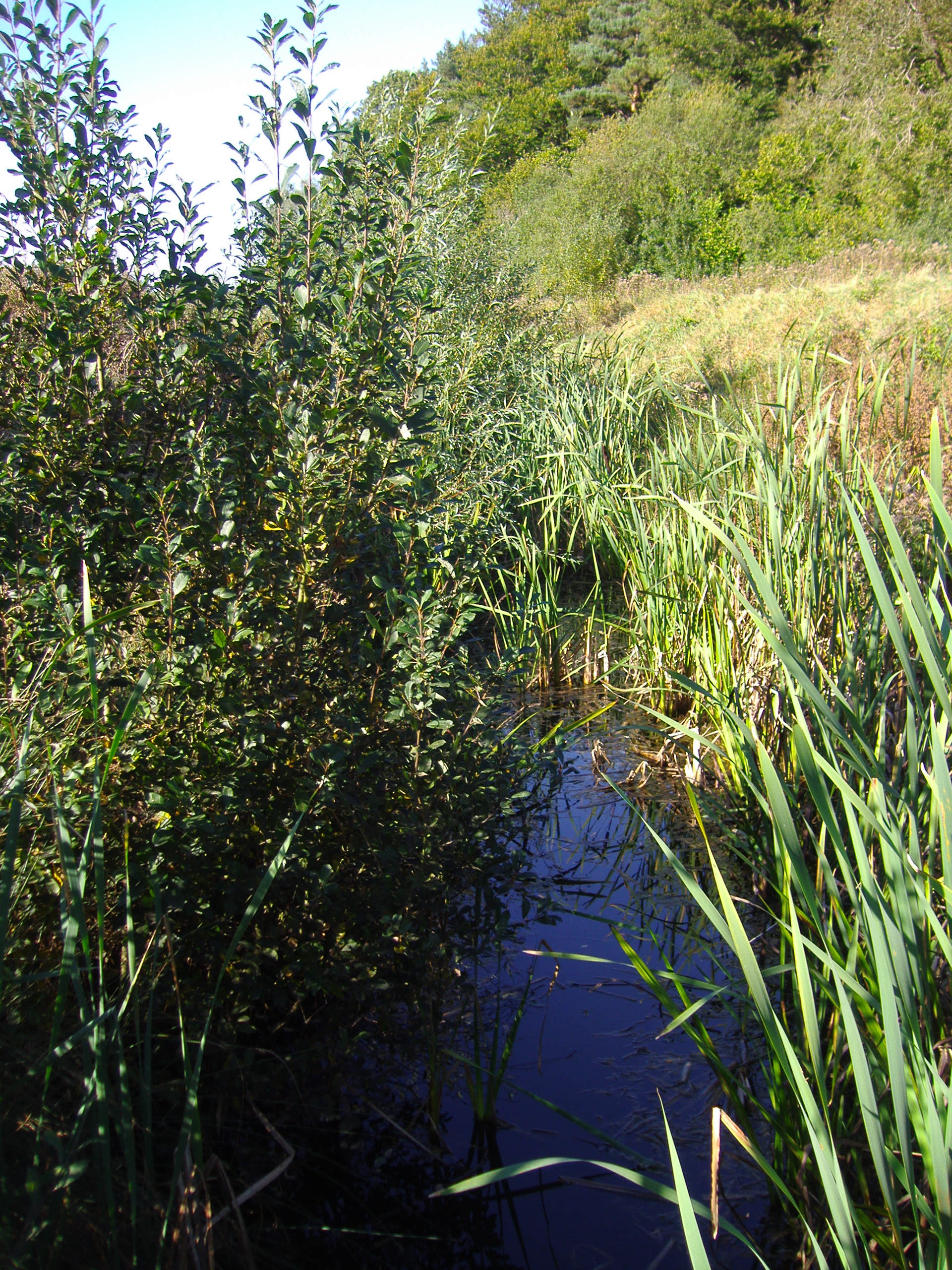
The River Cong close to the point where it flows under the A148 road

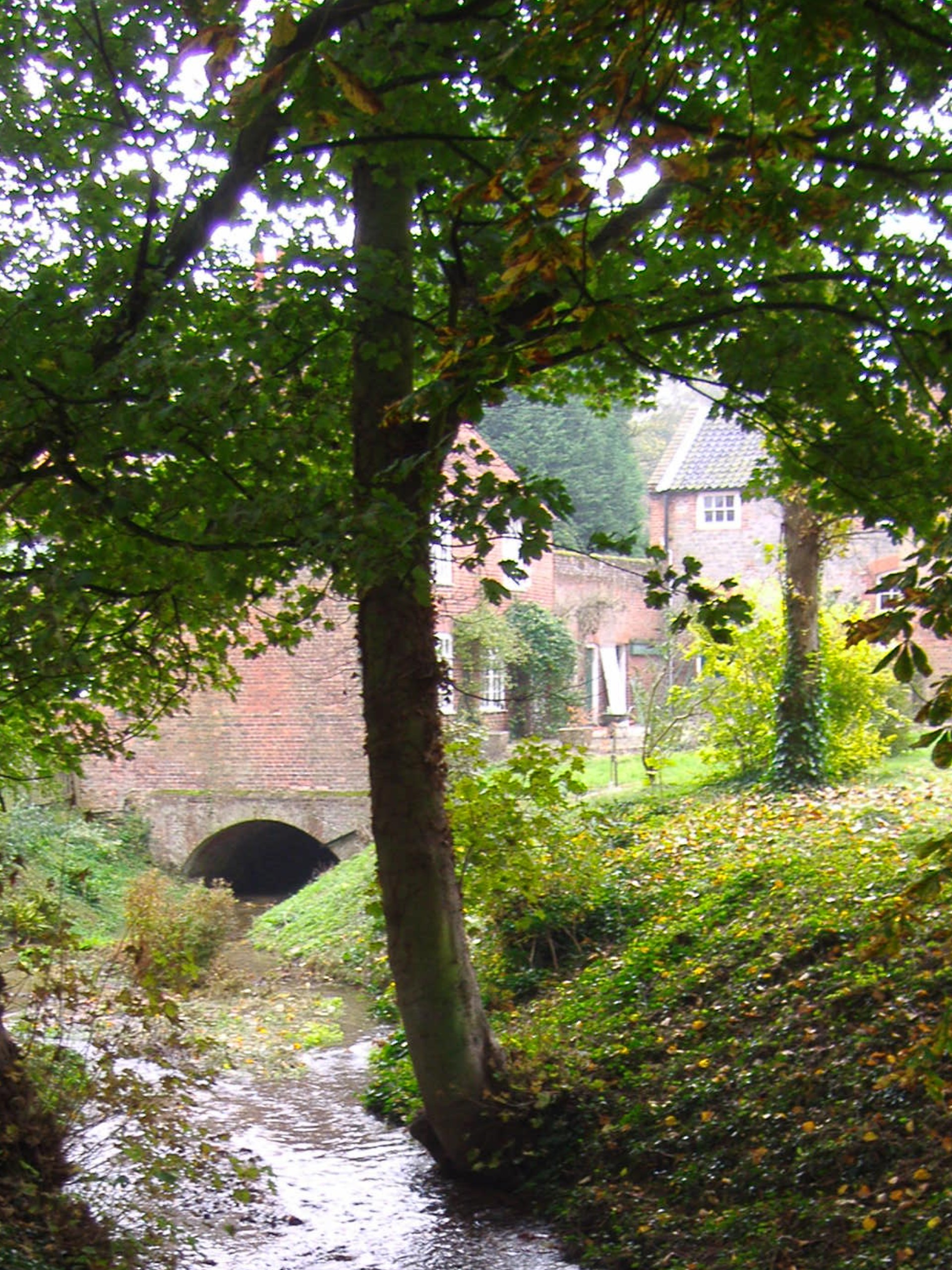
Congham Oil Watermill

The name of the stream does not appear on current Ordnance Survey maps, and few sources name it. One appearance of the name is in the neighbouring village of Congham, whose name is listed by one source as meaning "dwelling by the River Cong", though more recent sources suggest a possible direct meaning of dwelling "at the hill".

== Congham Oil Mill ==
The mill is said to have been built for processing whales. Whales were transported from King's Lynn docks by horse and wagon. The mill produced oil from whale blubber. The resultant whale bones were then taken by road to Narborough Bone Mill where they were ground into fertiliser. Some of the whale bones remain as ornaments at Congham Lodge to this day. The waterfall that drove the mill still remains. There would have been a horrendous smell especially in the summer, which was why the mill was situated away from King's Lynn itself. The Cong then flows on under the A148 and joins the Babingley close by the Gatton Waters caravan site.

== See also ==
- The River Babingley
