= Dersingham railway station =

Former railway station in North Norfolk, England

Coordinates: 52.8485°N 0.4937°E

Dersingham
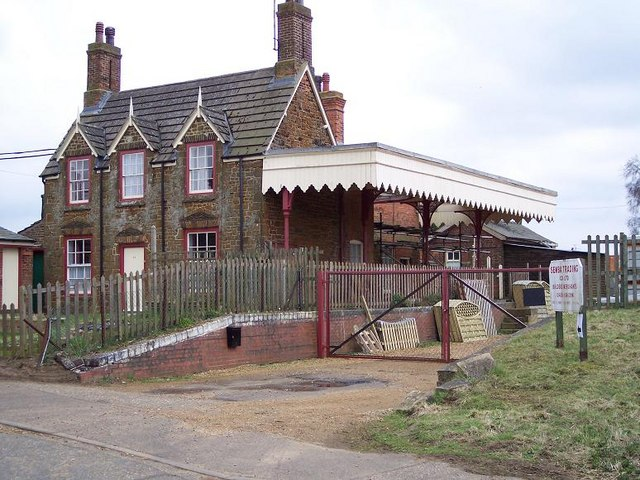
- Station buildings in 2006.

General information
- Location: Dersingham, King's Lynn and West Norfolk; England
- Grid reference: TF680307
- Platforms: 2

Other information
- Status: Disused

History
- Pre-grouping: Lynn and Hunstanton Railway; Great Eastern Railway
- Post-grouping: London and North Eastern Railway; Eastern Region of British Railways

Key dates
- 3 October 1862: Opened
- 5 May 1969: Closed
Location

Dersingham was a railway station on the King's Lynn to Hunstanton line which served the village of Dersingham, a few miles north of King's Lynn, in Norfolk, England.

== History ==
The station was opened on 3 October 1862 by the Lynn and Hunstanton Railway.

The station was host to a LNER camping coach from 1935 to 1939 and may have had a coach visiting in 1934.

The station closed along with the line on 5 May 1969.

At 8 miles 17 chains (13.22 km) from King's Lynn, Dersingham marked the halfway point of the Hunstanton line. It was situated in possibly the most attractive section of the route, where the line ran through extensive woodlands, between pine trees and rhododendrons, with the sea visible on the left.

Architecturally, the station resembles North Wootton, with a small main station building on the up platform and a small waiting room provided on the down platform; both had Great Eastern–style canopies. A small goods yard adjoined the main station building, and a standard Great Eastern gabled signal box was sited on the southern end of the down platform. A level crossing lay at the northern end of the station and, in common with other stations on the line, convenient lodging accommodation, a solidly built Carstone inn known as "The Alexandra Hotel", was to be found opposite the station approach.

Preceding station	Disused railways	Following station
Wolferton; Line and station closed	British Rail; Eastern Region; King's Lynn to Hunstanton branch	Snettisham; Line and station closed

== Present day ==
The station buildings, including canopies, signal box and both platforms, have largely survived since the station's closure. The platform and outbuildings are in use as offices and stores for Semba Trading, a builder's merchant, while the main station building has been converted into a private residence.
