= John Dolignon =

English cricketer

John William Dolignon
Personal information
- Born: 1813; Dersingham, Norfolk, England
- Died: 1896 (aged 82–83)

John William Dolignon (1813 – 15 June 1896) was an English cricketer of the nineteenth century. A batsman of unknown handedness, Dolignon was born in Dersingham, Norfolk, and played for the Marylebone Cricket Club and his alma mater Oxford University. His first-class matches took place between 1832 and 1844. An amateur player, Dolignon was also an alumnus of, and cricketer for, Eton college as well as Oxford University's Balliol College. He played non-first-class cricket for Norfolk between 1844 and 1848, and his final match was a Gentlemen v Players game at Lord's, where he represented the former.
