= HMS Sandringham (M2791) =

Minesweeper of the Royal Navy

History

United Kingdom
- Name: HMS Sandringham
- Namesake: Sandringham
- Builder: H. McLean, Renfrew
- Launched: 16 April 1957
- Completed: 11 September 1957
- Fate: Sold 1986

General characteristics
- Class & type: Ham-class minesweeper
- Notes: Pennant number(s): M2791 / IMS91

HMS Sandringham was one of 93 ships of the Ham-class of inshore minesweepers.

Their names were all chosen from villages ending in -ham. The minesweeper was named after Sandringham in Norfolk.

She was laid up in reserve at Rosneath and converted to serve as a ferry (1972–83) for RNAD Coulport workers. She was sold to Pounds in 1986 and became the Greek ferry Sotirakis II.
