= Wolferton railway station =

Former railway station in Norfolk, England

Coordinates: 52.8287°N 0.4632°E

Wolferton
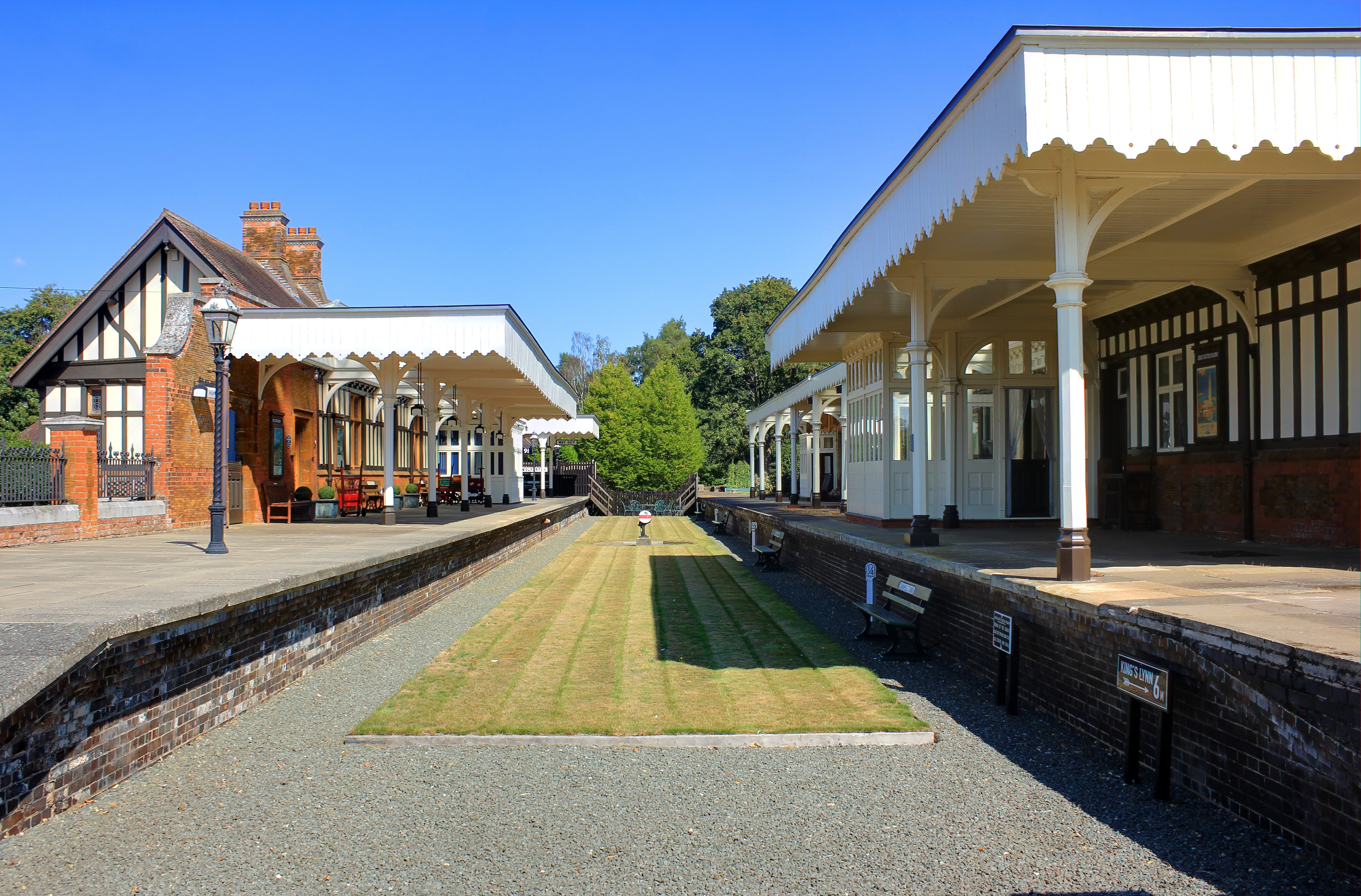
- Station platforms and buildings

General information
- Location: Wolferton, King's Lynn and West Norfolk, England
- Grid reference: TF660285
- Platforms: 2

Other information
- Status: Disused

History
- Original company: Lynn and Hunstanton Railway
- Pre-grouping: Great Eastern Railway
- Post-grouping: London and North Eastern Railway, Eastern Region of British Railways

Key dates
- 3 October 1862: Opened as Wolverton
- 15 July 1863: Renamed Wolferton
- 28 December 1964: Closed to freight
- 5 May 1969: Closed to passengers
Location

Wolferton was a railway station on the Lynn and Hunstanton Railway line, which opened in 1862 to serve the village of Wolferton, in Norfolk, England. It was well known as the nearest station to Sandringham House; royal trains brought the royal family to and from their estate until the station's closure in 1969.

== History ==
In February 1862, a large estate was purchased in Sandringham as a private residence for the young Prince of Wales. The eventual residence, Sandringham House, was only 2 1/4 mi (3.5 km) from the site of the Lynn & Hunstanton Railway's projected Wolferton railway station, and the directors much welcomed this unexpected development. The royal patronage of the station prompted its reconstruction in 1898 when extensive Tudor-style platform buildings were constructed at a cost of £8,132, including the royal waiting rooms on the Down platform which were fitted out with oak-panelling, couches and easy-chairs. The Up platform's buildings are similarly impressive, even including a small clocktower. Both platforms are equipped with standard Great Eastern platform canopies, and the ornate platform lamps are topped with miniature crowns.

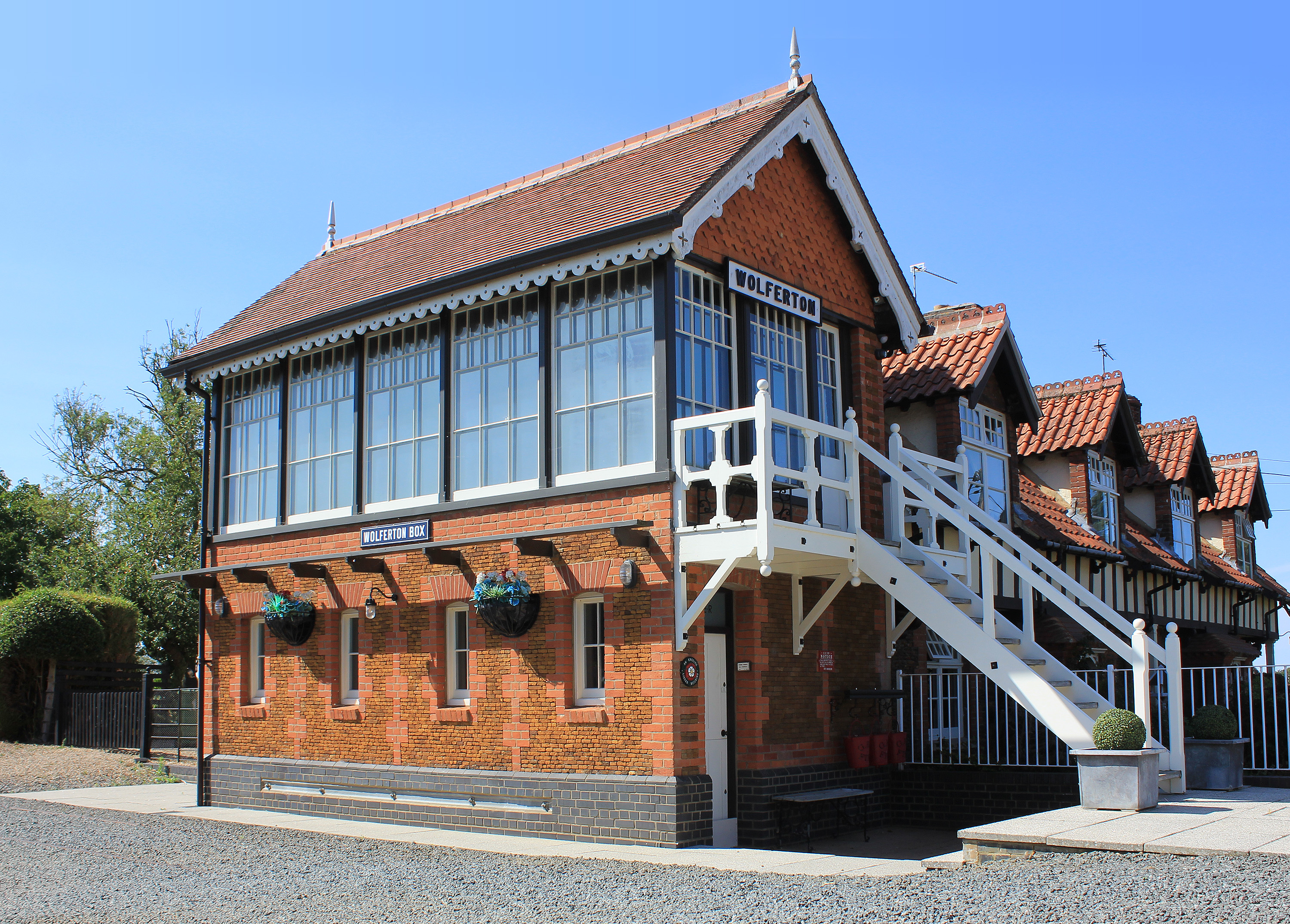
Wolferton Signal Box

A 40-lever brick and sandstone signal box was situated to the south of the platforms, controlling the northern extremity of the doubled section between Wolferton and King's Lynn, while the single-line section north was controlled by electric train tablet. The goods yard was on the Down side and was served by three sidings; four more sidings were to be found on the Up side. The station's facilities also included a spacious carriage dock, an ornate goods and coal storage building and a small gas works which provided sufficient gas to light the entire station.

Traffic mainly consisted of produce from the royal estate which included farms producing corn, vegetables and flax. Coal for Sandringham House and the outlying villages was also a regular source of traffic. Royal traffic to one side, Wolferton served a relatively rural area (population 234 in 1901) and was never a busy station except during Sandringham House parties. Prior to announcing the closure of the line in 1969, British Rail had enquired as to whether the Queen would be interested in purchasing the royal waiting rooms, which may have become expensive to maintain. She declined, but agreed that King's Lynn would be Sandringham House's nearest railhead, thereby opening the way to the line's closure.

Preceding station	Disused railways	Following station
North Wootton; Line and station closed	British Rail; Eastern Region; King's Lynn to Hunstanton branch	Dersingham; Line and station closed

== Royal use ==
The royal trains visited Wolferton no fewer than 645 times between 1884 and 1911. Public attention was focused on Wolferton on 10 March 1863, when it was used for the wedding special of the Prince of Wales who was to make the station's royal waiting room a focal point for the Sandringham Estate. The station played host to luncheon parties during shoots and the drive from Sandringham House to Wolferton led directly to the line.

The twenty-first birthday of Prince George on 3 June 1886 saw a special royal train bring the Sayer's Circus to Wolferton; after the performance, one of the elephants could not be reloaded back on to the train, and was tied to a lamppost which it promptly uprooted, before demolishing the station gates and then calmly boarding its truck.

Royal trains bound for Wolferton departed from St. Pancras station (the City being traditionally barred to royalty, except on special occasions) and was routed via Tottenham Hale to the Great Eastern Railway's Cambridge line. Typically, a royal train departed St Pancras at 12:20 pm, arriving at King's Lynn at 2:32 pm, before leaving three minutes later for the ten-minute journey to Wolferton.

The Edwardian period saw Wolferton at its zenith as European royal families and heads of state were regular visitors. The station also saw at least three royal funeral processions: Queen Alexandra in 1925, King George V in 1936 and King George VI in 1952.

On 11 February 1952, the body of King George VI, who had died at Sandringham on 6 February, was taken to London King's Cross; thousands lined the Cambridge main line to pay their respects. The last royal train to call at the station was in 1966; it had latterly been associated with the traditional Christmas and New Year holidays at Sandringham.

== Post-closure ==
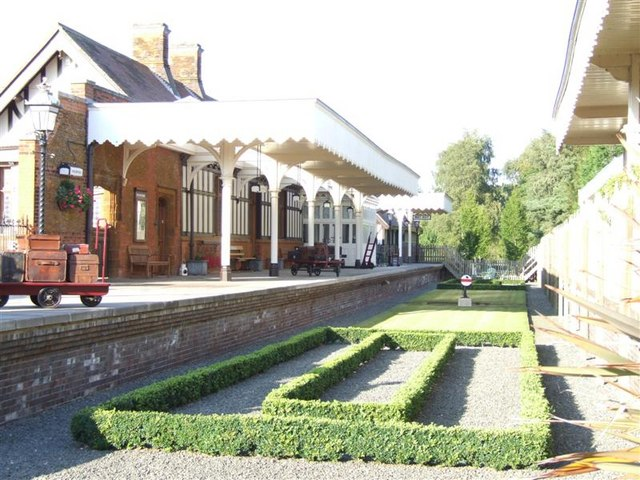
The station in 2007

Shortly after its closure, Wolferton was sold by British Rail to railwayman Eric Walker. He reopened the royal waiting room in 1970, as a museum to display his 6,000-item collection of royal and historical memorabilia. Walker died in 1986 and his son, Roger Hedly-Walker, wanted to sell the station, ostensibly because he was unable to obtain permission from the royal estate to erect a larger sign advertising the museum and that the 18,000 visitors per year were insufficient to meet running costs.

The station and contents went unsold, although the vendor did manage to dispose of a stash of 450 original London and North Eastern Railway posters; these had been collected by his father during the 1920s and 1930s, which were stored beneath a trap door in the royal waiting room. These were also offered for sale and reached £98,000 at auction.

The signal box at Wolferton, now Grade II* listed, was itself offered for sale by auction on 14 May 1989; the signalling mechanism was to be sold separately. In 1990, citing ill-health and the need to pay inheritance tax, Hedly-Walker auctioned the station's contents for around £100,000 and asked £250,000 for the station building. The station was purchased by Richard Brown in 2001; he has since carried out a substantial refurbishment of the Down side station buildings, crossing gates and signal box.

== The site today ==
After spending some time as a museum, the station is now preserved in private hands. The signal box and part of the station are listed buildings, Grade II*.

The signal box has been restored and still houses its original lever frame and gate wheel. The levers and interlocking mechanism were extensively refurbished and refitted with assistance from the local North Norfolk Railway's signal engineering department.

In August 2026, the station was put up for sale, with an asking price of £1.25 million.
