= Sandringham Hotel =

Sandringham Hotel may refer to:

- Sandringham Hotel, Newtown, Sydney, New South Wales, Australia
- Sandringham Hotel, Hunstanton, England
