= Wolferton =

Village in Norfolk, England

Coordinates: 52.82762°N 0.45946°E

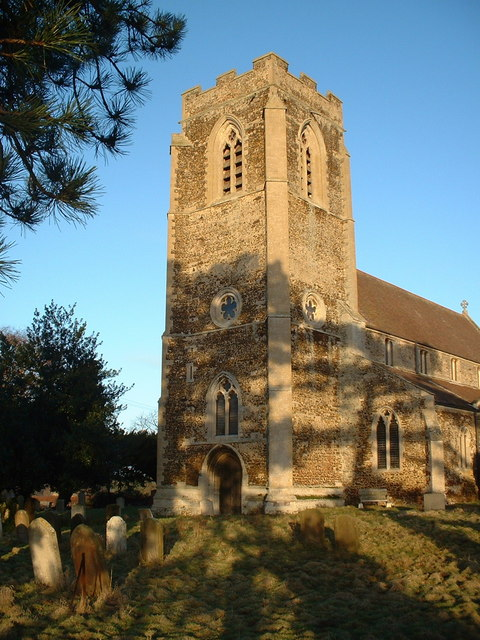
- Church of St Peter, Wolferton

- Location within Norfolk
- Civil parish: Sandringham
- District: King's Lynn and West Norfolk
- Shire county: Norfolk
- Region: East
- Country: England
- Sovereign state: United Kingdom
- Post town: King's Lynn
- Postcode district: PE31
- Dialling code: 01485

Wolferton is a village and former civil parish, now in the parish of Sandringham, in the King's Lynn and West Norfolk district of Norfolk, England. It is 2 miles west of Sandringham, 7½ miles north of King's Lynn and 37¼ miles northwest of Norwich. In 1931 the parish had a population of 185. On 1 April 1935 the parish was abolished and merged with Sandringham.

== Background ==
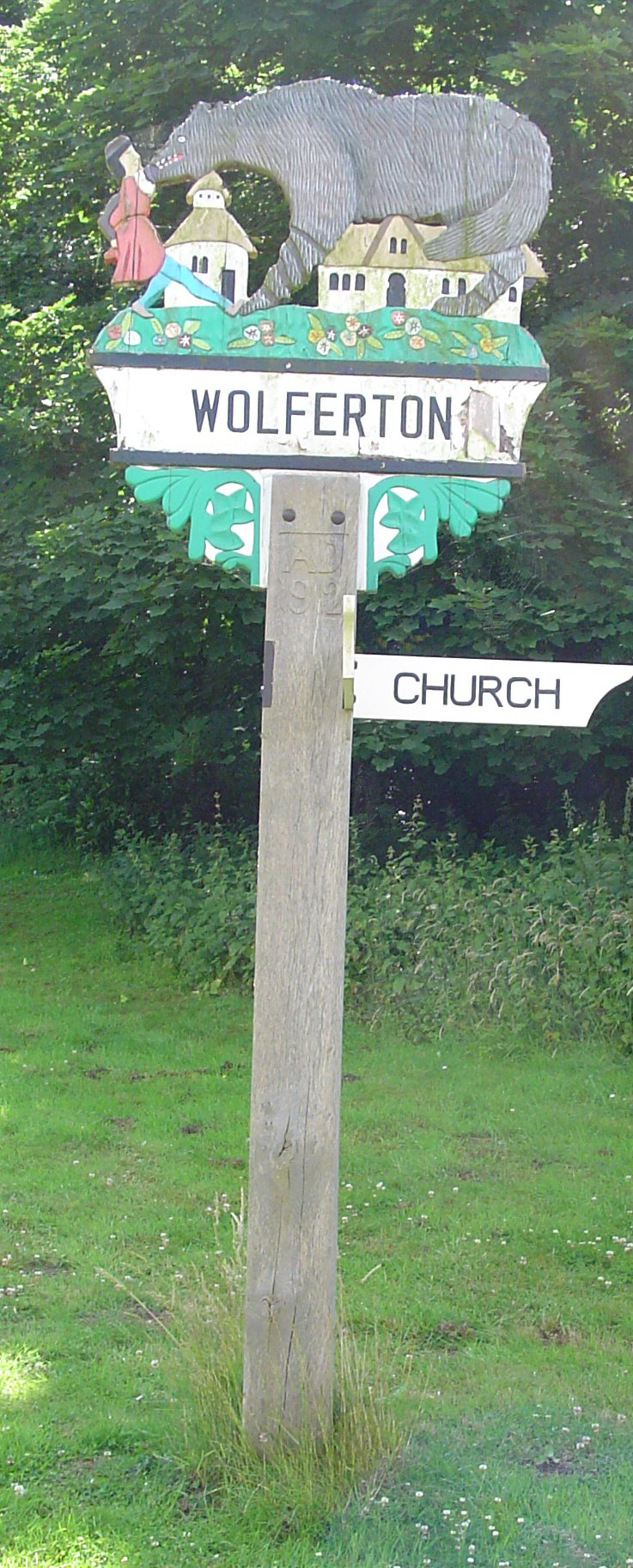
Wolferton village sign

The village was previously known as Wolverton which can be seen on old OS Maps dated 1798–1878. The village's name means 'Wulfhere's farm/settlement'.

Wolferton is best known as the location of Wolferton railway station. The station was opened in 1862 after Queen Victoria had purchased the site of Sandringham House as a Norfolk retreat. The station contained a set of elegant reception rooms, where the several generations of the royal family and their visitors would wait for transportation to Sandringham House. The 13th-century St Peter's Church was damaged by fire in the 15th century, and restored in the 19th century by Arthur Blomfield. It retains its medieval parclose screens.

The parish includes two royal properties, Wood Farm, former residence of Prince Philip, Duke of Edinburgh, and Marsh Farm, residence of Andrew Mountbatten-Windsor.
