= West Newton, Norfolk =

Village in Norfolk, England

Coordinates: 52.81836°N 0.51533°E

West Newton
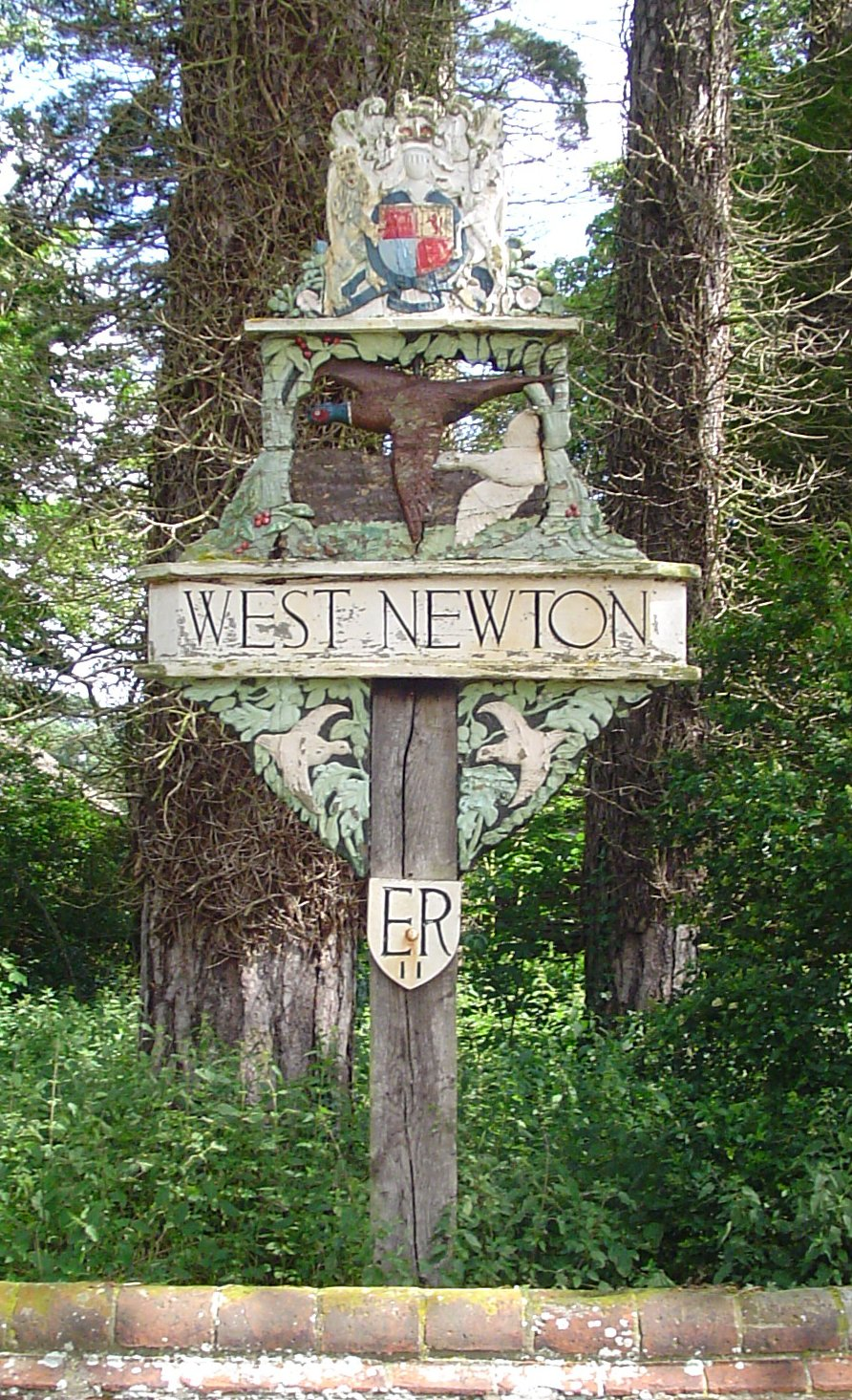
- The village sign

- Location within Norfolk
- Civil parish: Sandringham
- District: King's Lynn and West Norfolk
- Shire county: Norfolk
- Region: East
- Country: England
- Sovereign state: United Kingdom

West Newton is a village and former civil parish, now in the parish of Sandringham, in the King's Lynn and West Norfolk district, in the north of the county of Norfolk, England. The village is 1 kilometre (0.62 mi) south of Sandringham, 11 kilometres (7 mi) north of the town of King's Lynn and 60 kilometres (37 mi) north-west of the city of Norwich. In 1931 the parish had a population of 198.

== History ==
The village's name means "new farm or settlement". 'West' to distinguish from other Newtons.

West Newton is included in Snettisham's complex entry in the Domesday Book where it is divided in ownership between William de Warenne and the Bishop of Bayeux. Related berewicks are West Newton and Castle Rising, moreover Weston Longville is said to be in Snettisham's valuation. However West Newton is clearly in the ownership of the Bishop of Bayeux.

On 1 April 1935, the parish was abolished and merged with Sandringham.

West Newton parish church is dedicated to Saint Peter and Saint Paul, and has a fourteenth-century church tower.
