= Sandringham, Norfolk =

Village in Norfolk, England

Coordinates: 52.82737°N 0.51437°E

Sandringham
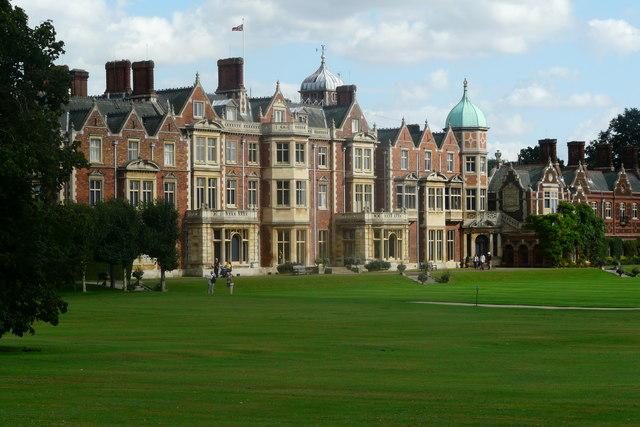
- Sandringham House

- Location within Norfolk
- Area: 41.91 km^{2} (16.18 sq mi)
- Population: 437 (2011)
  - Density: 10/km^{2} (26/sq mi)
- OS grid reference: TF695285
- Civil parish: Sandringham
- District: King's Lynn and West Norfolk
- Shire county: Norfolk
- Region: East
- Country: England
- Sovereign state: United Kingdom
- Post town: SANDRINGHAM
- Postcode district: PE35
- Dialling code: 01485
- Police: Norfolk
- Fire: Norfolk
- Ambulance: East of England
- UK Parliament: North West Norfolk

Sandringham is a village and civil parish in the north of the English county Norfolk, in the East of England. The village is situated 2 kilometres (1.2 mi) south of Dersingham, 12 km (7.5 mi) north of King's Lynn, and 60 km (37 mi) north-west of Norwich.

The village's name means 'Sandy Dersingham', with Dersingham meaning 'homestead/village of Deorsige's people'.

The civil parish extends westwards from Sandringham village to the shore of the Wash 6 km (3.7 mi) distant, and includes the villages West Newton and Wolferton. It has an area of 41.91 km^{2} (16.18 sq mi) and in 2001 had a population of 402 in 176 households. The population had increased to 437 at the 2011 census. For the purposes of local government, the parish is in the district of King's Lynn and West Norfolk.

Sandringham is best known as the location of Sandringham House and its estate, a private residence of British monarchs since Edward VII, who used it as a holiday home. Near to the house is the Royal Stud, a stud farm that houses many of the royal horses. The village was the birthplace of Diana, Princess of Wales.

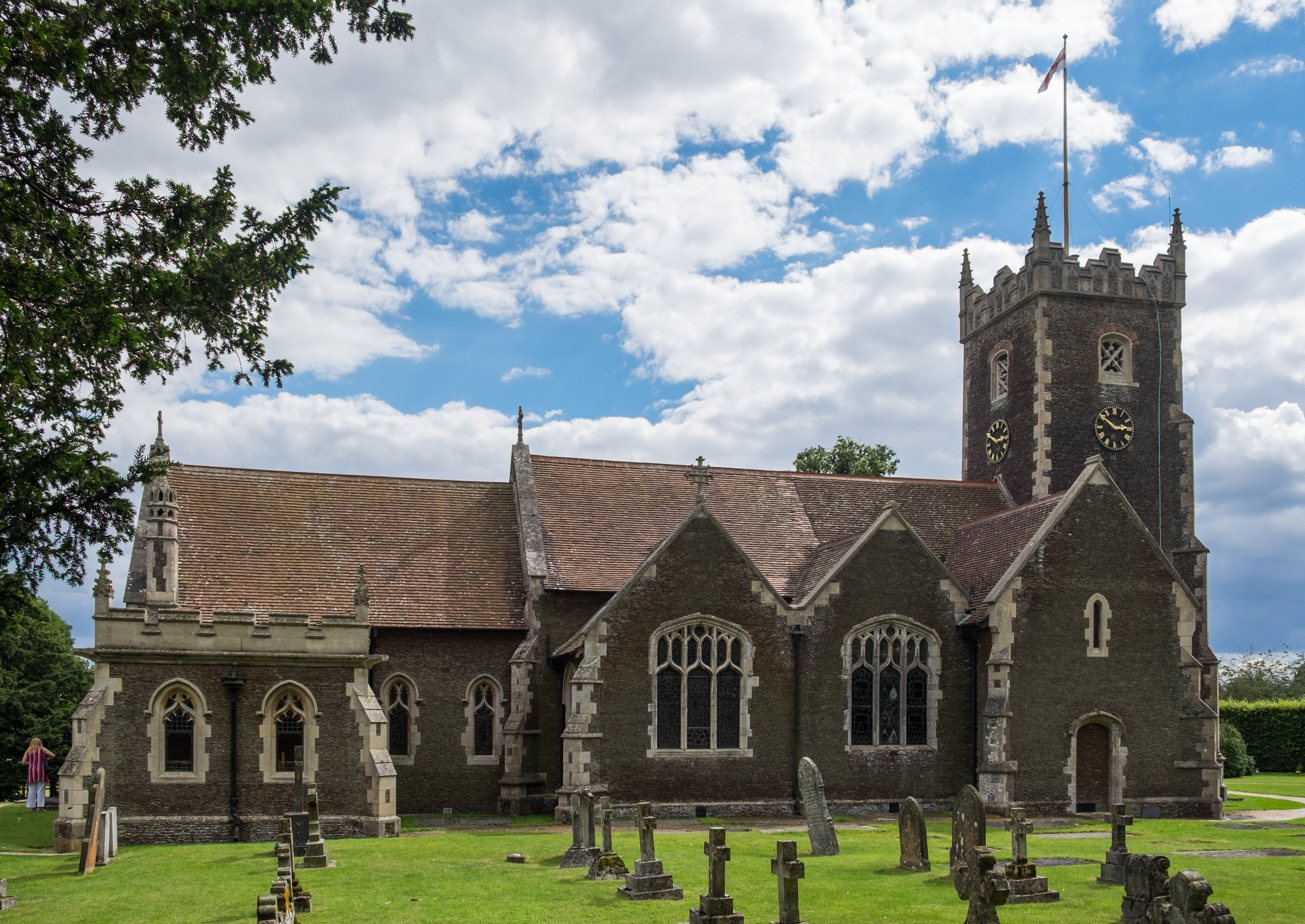
St Mary Magdalene Church

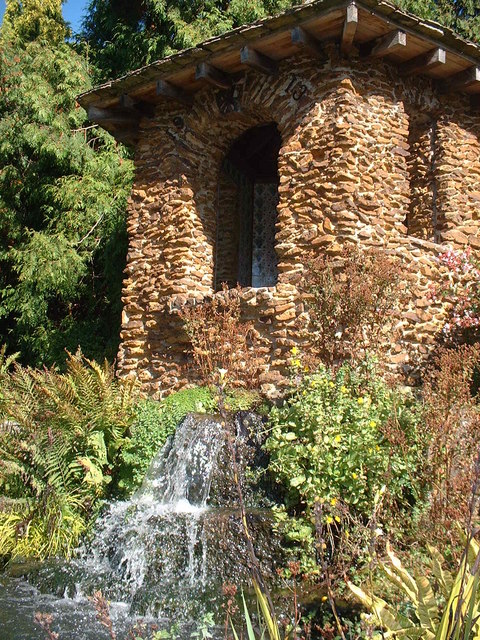
Queen Alexandra's Nest

== See also ==
- HMS Sandringham
