= Mid-Norfolk Railway =

Heritage railway in Norfolk, England

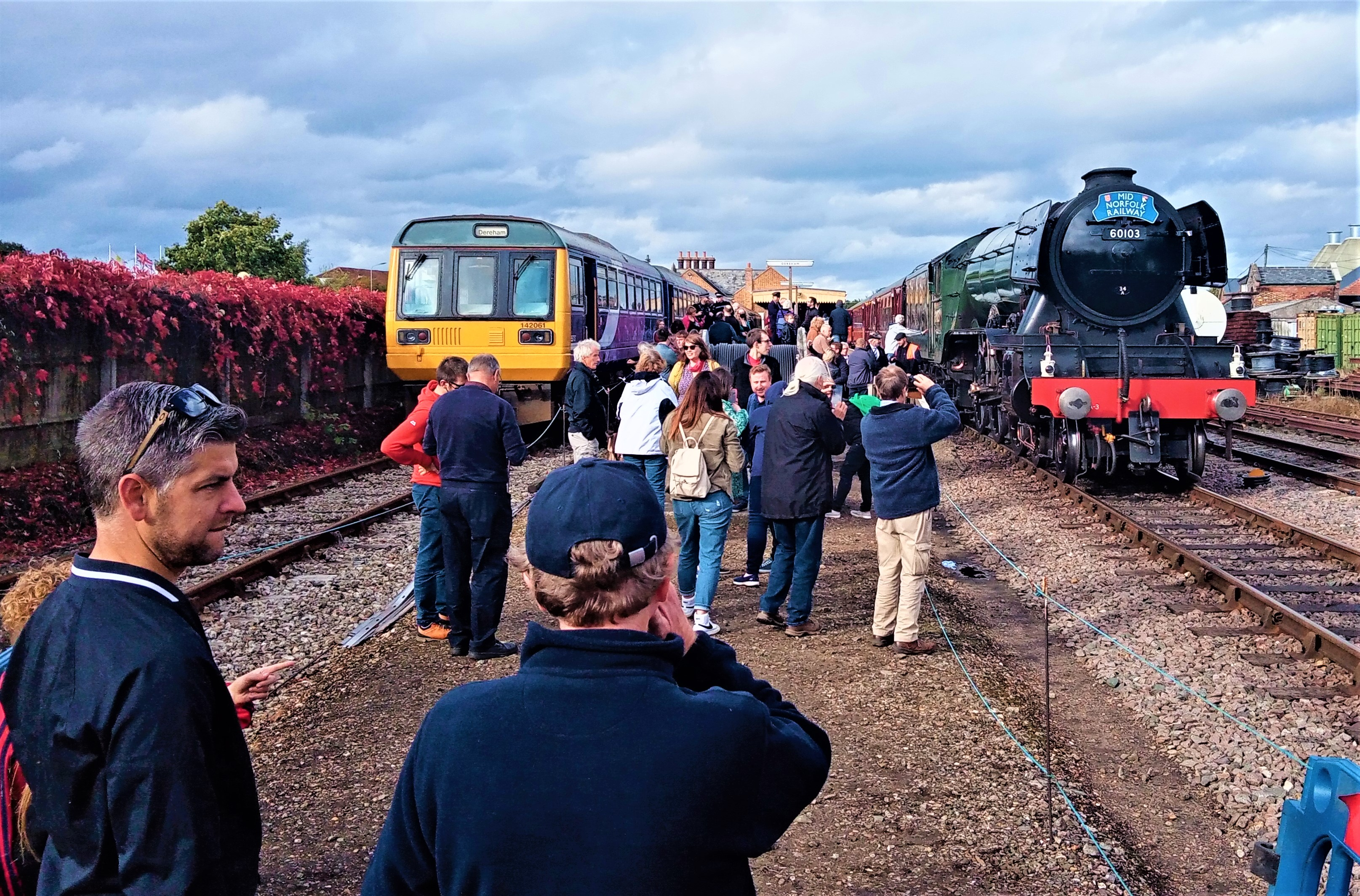
- Locale: England
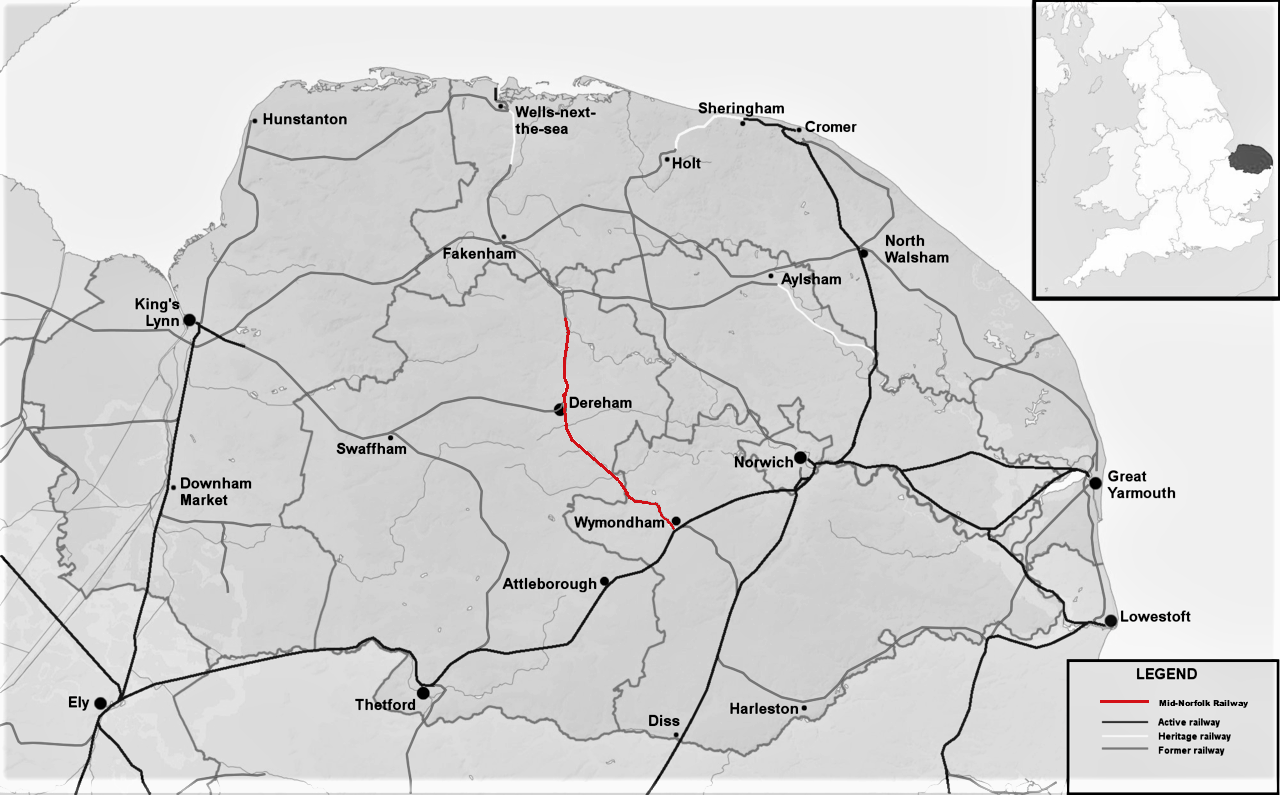
- Connections: Network Rail (at Wymondham South Junction)

Commercial operations
- Name: The Mid-Norfolk Railway
- Built by: Samuel Morton Peto
- Original gauge: 4 ft 8 1/2 in (1,435 mm) standard gauge

Preserved operations
- Operated by: Mid-Norfolk Railway Preservation Trust
- Stations: 5
- Length: 17 miles 40 chains (28.2 km); 15 mi (24 km) operational
- Preserved gauge: 4 ft 8 1/2 in (1,435 mm) standard gauge

Commercial history
- Opened: 1845
- Closed to passengers: 6 October 1969
- Closed: Between 1980 and 1989

Preservation history
- 1974: Wymondham, Dereham and Fakenham Rail Action Committee formed
- 1978: Fakenham & Dereham Society formed
- 1995: Dereham Rash's Green to Yaxham re-opens to passengers
- 1997: Dereham railway station re-opens to passengers
- 1998: Dereham to Wymondham section re-opens to goods
- 1999: Dereham to Wymondham section re-opens to passengers
- 2013: First passenger train to Hoe
- 2018: First passenger train to Worthing
- Headquarters: Dereham

Website
- www.midnorfolkrailway.co.uk

The Mid-Norfolk Railway (MNR) is a 17 1/2 miles (28.2 km) preserved standard gauge heritage railway, one of the longest in Great Britain. Preservation efforts began in 1974, but the line re-opened to passengers only in the mid-1990s as part of the "new generation" of heritage railways. The MNR owns and operates most of the former Wymondham-Fakenham branch line of the Norfolk Railway. The branch opened in 1847, was closed to passengers in stages from 1964 to 1969 as part of the Beeching cuts, and was finally fully closed to goods traffic in 1989. (The northern section of this line, to Wells, was built by the Wells and Fakenham Railway and part of this has been operated by the Wells and Walsingham Light Railway since 1982.)

Regular steam and diesel services run 11 1/2 miles (18.5 km) through the centre of Norfolk between the market towns of Wymondham and Dereham via Yaxham, Thuxton and Kimberley Park, and occasional sightseer services continue north of Dereham passing the nearby village of Hoe, where there is no station, to the limit of the operational line at Worthing. The line is periodically used for commercial freight operations and staff instruction for mainline railway companies. The company owns the line to a point just beyond County School railway station, which will make it the third longest heritage railway in England once restoration is complete.

The MNR is owned and operated by the Mid-Norfolk Railway Preservation Trust (MNRPT, a charitable company limited by guarantee), and is mostly operated and staffed by volunteers. The railway is listed as exempt from the UK Railways (Interoperability) Regulations 2000.

== History ==
=== Route history ===
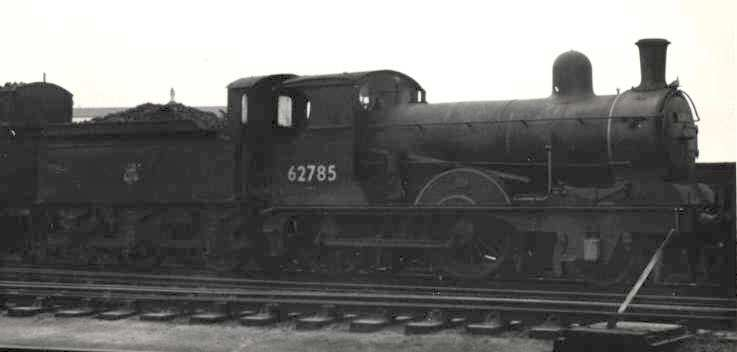
A GER Class T26, a type often used on passenger trains to Wells before the Grouping, after which most such trains were operated by Claud Hamilton 4-4-0s.

The Wymondham to Wells branch was opened in stages between 15 February 1847 and 1857, after consent was given by Parliament in 1845. The entire line became part of the Great Eastern Railway in 1862. The Wymondham to Dereham section received double track in 1882, while the line north of there remained single track.

Along with the rest of the Great Eastern Railway, the branch became part of the Southern Area of the London and North Eastern Railway when the various British railway companies were grouped into four large companies in 1923. The line was heavily used during World War I and World War II, with extra Air Ministry sidings provided at Dereham in 1943. In the early days of the war, Dereham was used as a reception centre for the construction materials used to build the local airfields.

The nationalisation of the "Big Four" railway companies placed the line as part of the Eastern Region of British Railways on 1 January 1948. The branch line between County School and Wroxham closed to passengers on 15 September 1952, with the section between Foulsham and Reepham closing to goods as well. A stub of the western section, between County School and Foulsham remained open for goods until 31 October 1964, being busiest in the sugar beet season.

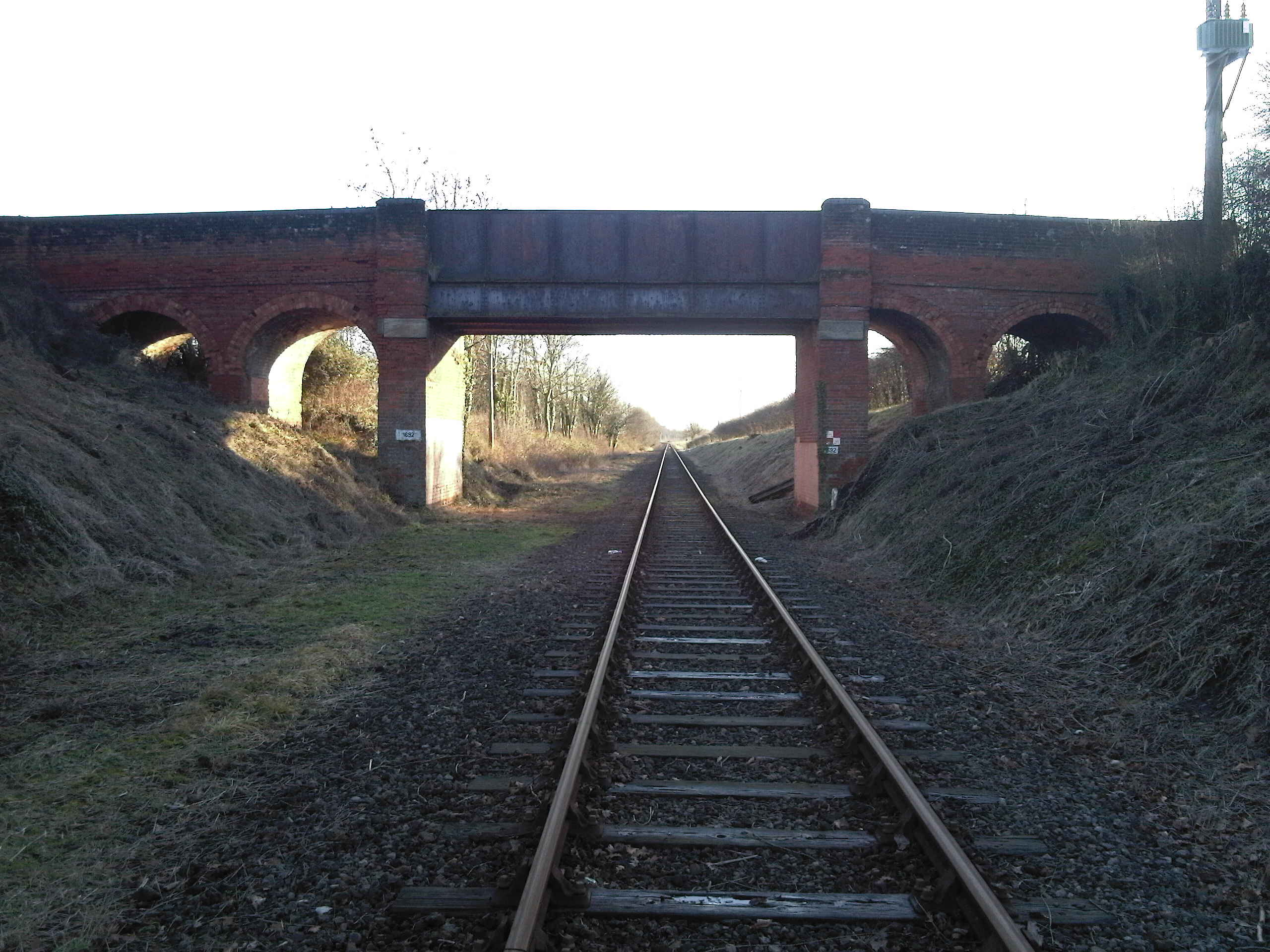
Bridge 1692, partially rebuilt for double track, showing 1965 to present day singled line.

The passenger service between Dereham and Wells ended on 5 October 1964. Dereham became an intermediate station for Norwich to King's Lynn services. In June 1965, the Wymondham to Dereham section was reduced to single track with a passing loop at Hardingham. The passenger service from King's Lynn ended on 9 September 1968, with the Midland & Great Northern Joint Railway Society operating the 'East Anglian Branch Line Farewell' DMU special on the final Saturday. The withdrawal of the remaining passenger services, between Wymondham and Dereham, followed in October 1969.

Goods traffic continued after the passenger closure. The 1973 oil crisis led to a meeting being held at Dereham in 1974 by the Railway Development Society in order to petition for the restoration of passenger services between Wymondham and Fakenham. British Rail gave a price of £247,000 for such a restoration, but this proposal was rejected by Norfolk County Council. This meeting resulted in the formation of the Wymondham, Dereham and Fakenham Railway Action Committee.

In 1977 the Wymondham, Dereham and Fakenham Railway Action Committee presented the Norfolk County Chief Planning Officer with a report putting the case for restoring rail passenger services between Norwich, Dereham and Fakenham East. Services over the line ceased in June 1989.

=== Preservation ===
==== Fakenham and Dereham Railway Society ====
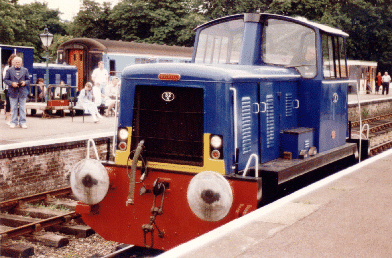
Heritage operations at County School, 1993

Fakenham & Dereham Railway Society (F&DRS), a forerunner of the MNR, was formed in 1978. The 1980 constitution of the society included its aim:

2a The aim of the organisation is to preserve the existing railway line between Wymondham and Fakenham in as far as near as practicable its original form on 1 January 1980. To ultimately, if at all possible, encourage extension of the line beyond that as on 1 January 1980. b To encourage use of the railway line between Wymondham and Dereham by freight and passengers. To assist the Fakenham and Dereham Railway Company Limited or any other Company involved in railway preservation.

In 1980 the F&DRS attempted to preserve the Ryburgh to Fakenham section of line failed, and the society instead leased Hardingham station in 1983. The small heritage centre had track re-laid in the former goods yard, and acquired a Ruston 0-4-0 diesel locomotive. The centre was commercially unsuccessful, forcing the society to leave the site—which was auctioned in 1986—and move to a temporary location at Yaxham station.

In 1987 Breckland District Council bought the station at County School, and granted the F&DRS a 999-year lease, inviting the society to re-lay track and relocate to the site. The intention was to re-connect the station with British Rail's railhead at North Elmham to connect with charter trains operating over the branch. This plan was abandoned when the complete closure of the line from June 1989 was announced.

==== Mid-Norfolk Railway Society and Great Eastern Railway (1989) Ltd. ====
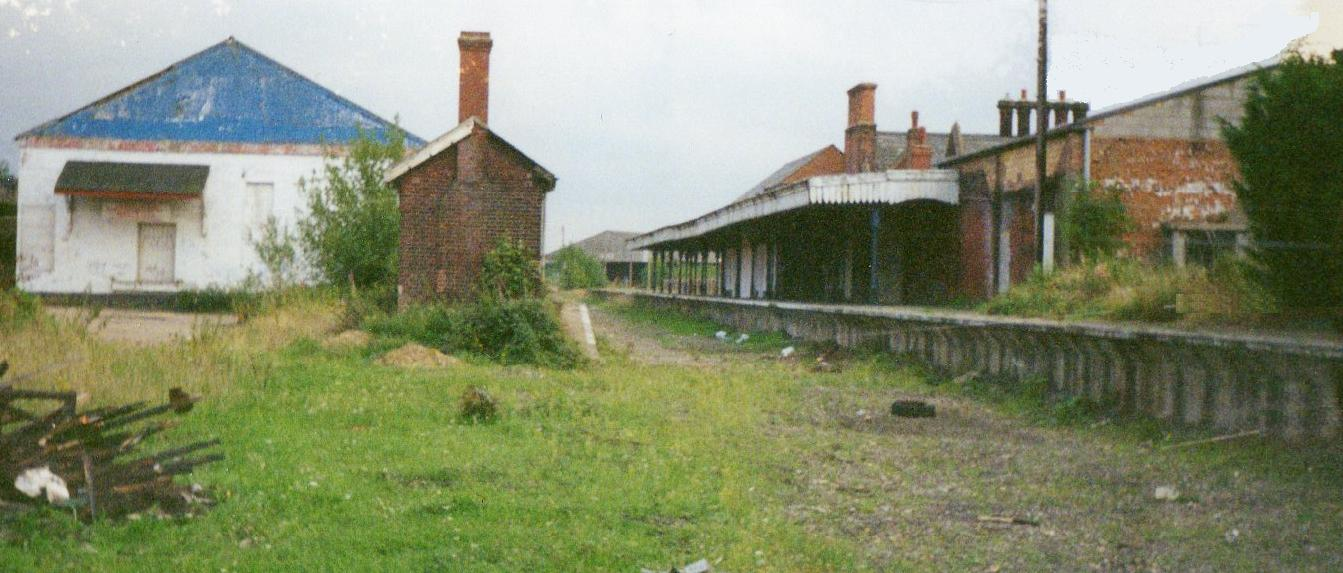
Derelict remains of Dereham station in 1990.

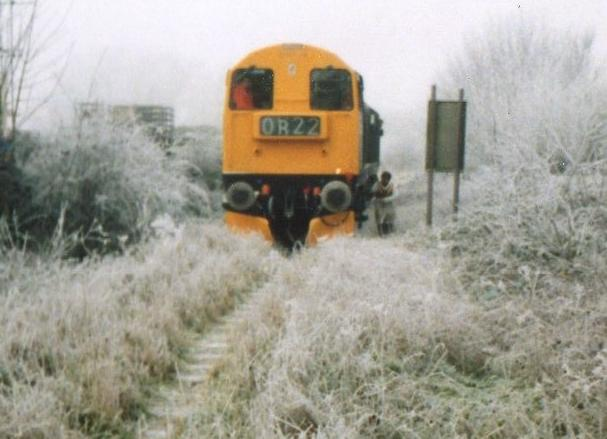
The first MNR train to Yaxham, December 1994

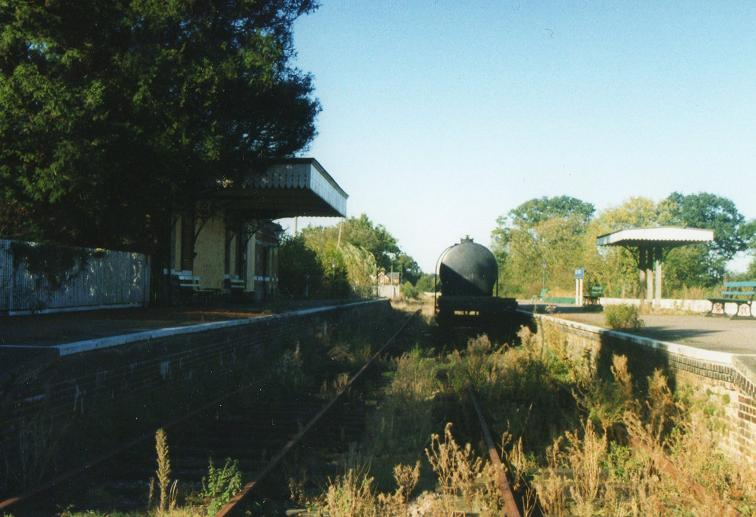
County School in 1996, before restoration by the MNRPT.

In response to the approaching closure of the entire branch between Wymondham, Dereham and North Elmham, the Great Eastern Railway (1989) Limited formed to save the line. The F&DRS backed this scheme, and signed its lease of County School station over to the company. The society, renamed the Mid-Norfolk Railway Society in 1990, continued to provide financial backing and manpower for the development of the County School site. The running line was extended over 1/2 mile (0.80 km) towards North Elmham, and a collection of rolling stock was built up. The first passenger train, a Mk2 brake coach converted to work as a DBSO with an industrial diesel locomotive, operated at the County School site on 2 November 1991.

On 21 April 1990 the constitution of the organisation amended the aims of the society:

2. The aim of the organisation is to assist the Fakenham & Dereham Railway Company Ltd in its efforts to reopen and preserve the railway between Fakenham and Dereham. Also to support and assist any other company or organisation that actively reopens and preserves the railway line between Wymondham, Dereham and County School.

In 1991 the managing director of the GER (1989) Ltd. stated that he had raised much of the required finance and that the company intended to provide a regular passenger train service over the line by 1993. About 400 commuters a day were expected to use the service. Plans were also announced for special excursions such as shopping trips to London and summer seaside services. The plans included providing a hotel and conference centre at Dereham, along with a public house and shopping arcade.

During the early 1990s the GER(1989), contrary to the earlier announcements relating to the future of the line, announced plans to lift the railway between Dereham and Wymondham. The MNRS withdrew their support for the GER(1989) and made their own bid for the line.

In 1994 the British Railways Property Board granted the MNRS access to the railway line between Wymondham and North Elmham on a temporary 'care and maintenance' basis. This was in response to increasing levels of vandalism occurring at the site, a problem which had worsened after the Great Eastern company had lifted the track between Norwich Road level crossing and a point just north of the Automatic Open Level Crossings. The first working party was held at Dereham station on Saturday 23 July 1994.

In December 1994 Class 20 diesels 20069 and 20206 were moved by road from County School to the truncated railhead at Dereham. On Christmas Eve, with permission from British Rail, both locomotives made their way along the line to Yaxham station.

In 1995 Yorkshire Bank called in the receivers to solve concerns with the Great Eastern Railway (1989) Ltd. In June 1995 Breckland Council informed the receivers that they wished for the GER (1989) Ltd. to give up the lease for County School station so that they could review their operations in respect of the site. The GER (1989) Ltd., who stated that they were attracting 12,000 visitors a year to the site, announced that they would contest this decision.

In July 1995, police were called in to investigate the sudden and unauthorised road transfer of two Mid-Norfolk Railway Society Mk 2 coaches to a breaker's yard at nearby Lenwade. In July 1996 Breckland District Council issued a threat to stop trains running at County School station, as it was found that someone other than the leaseholder was operating trains at the site; the lease being non-transferable. In November 1996 Breckland District Council brought in 24-hour security guards at the County School site in order to prevent the stripping of the property after having served an eviction order on the GER(1989) in mid-October.

County School station was boarded up and GER (1989) Ltd rolling stock was concentrated in the isolated yard prior to disposal or scrapping. All track north of the station platforms was lifted, and, as shown in the photograph, the site was left to become derelict.

==== Mid-Norfolk Railway Preservation Trust ====
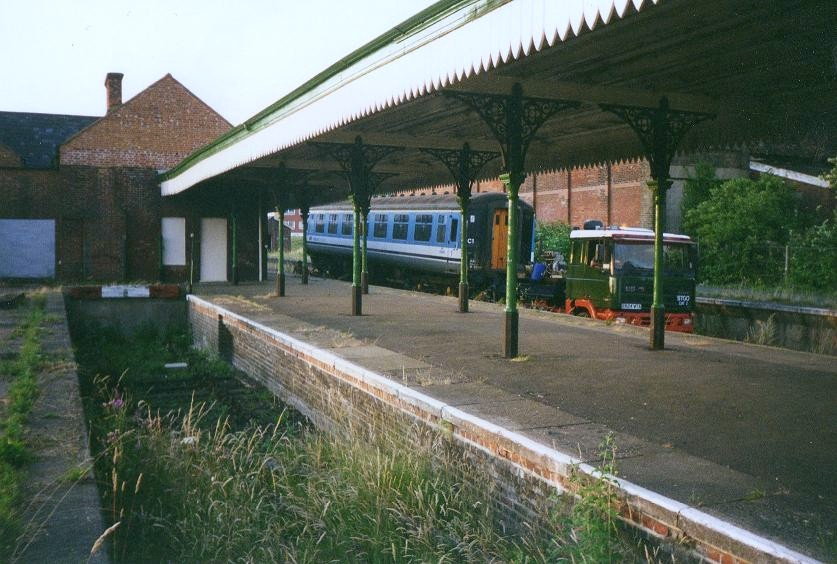
Stock being delivered through a derelict and trackless Dereham station, 1995.

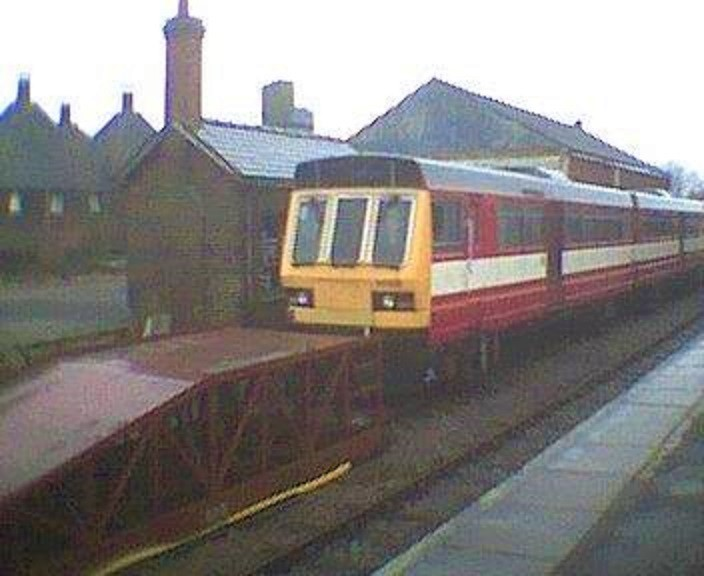
Class 141 141108 and MOD loading ramp (2002)

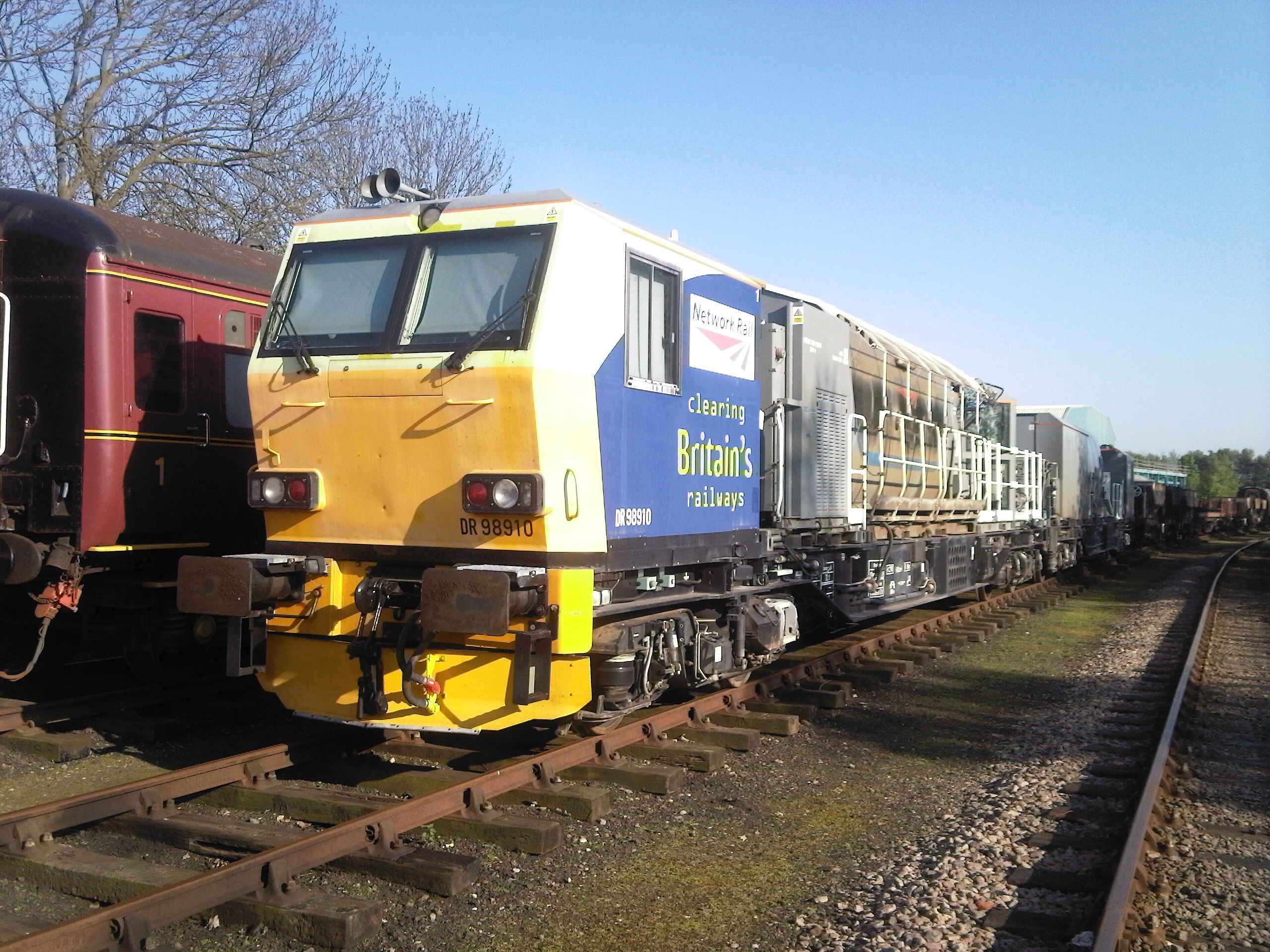
Windhoff Multi-Purpose Vehicle DR98910/60 at Dereham (2008)

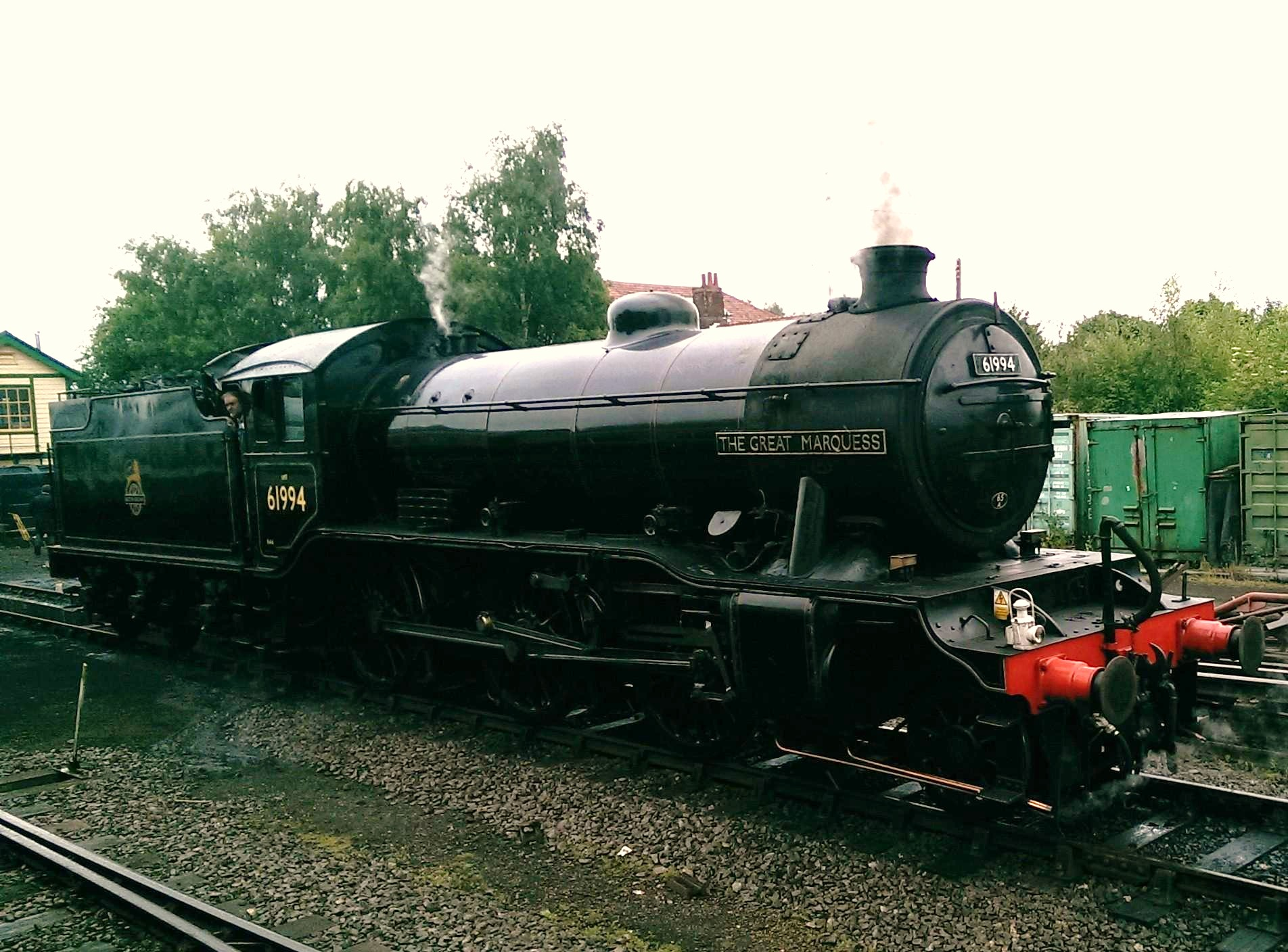
LNER K4 locomotive in the yard at Dereham, 2014.

The Mid-Norfolk Railway Preservation Trust (MNRPT) was formed in 1995 through the merger of the campaign groups and organisations that had been trying to restore passenger services over the route since 1974. The aims of the new charity were established:

To preserve and to renovate reconstruct and operate for the benefit of the people of the County of Norfolk and of the nation at large, whatever of the historical, architectural and constructional heritage that may exist of the permanent way, track, buildings (including any buildings as defined in Section 336(1) of the Town And Country Planning Act 1990), bridges, operating equipment and rolling stock once forming part of or connected with or adjacent to the Great Eastern Railway line running between County School at North Elmham in the County of Norfolk and Wymondham in the County of Norfolk.

In July 1995 two Mk2 coaches were transferred by road from County School railway station to the truncated railhead at Dereham, where they were placed between the already present Class 20 locomotives. These coaches were then hauled to the MNR's temporary base at Yaxham. A further three coaches were delivered on 17 August.

On 29 November 1995 the section of railway between Yaxham station and a temporary halt built beside a footpath crossing on the Rash's Green industrial estate in Dereham was inspected by Chris Hall, H.M. Principal Inspecting Officer of Railways. Permission to operate passenger trains over this section was granted from Saturday 23 December 1995. 63 trains, each composed of the five Mk2 coaches topped and tailed by the Class 20s, were operated between this date and 14 January 1996. In October 1995 Breckland District Council established a rail working party to consider purchasing the line from British Rail, then leasing it out to a rail group – of which the Mid-Norfolk Railway was the preferred lessee.

On 11 April 1998 the Mid-Norfolk Railway Preservation Trust bought the route between Wymondham and Dereham for £100,000. This included the Dereham station buildings and the 6.5 acres (2.6 ha) goods yard. The British Rail Property Board also sold the 4 1/2 miles (7.2 km) of track between Dereham and North Elmham for £25,000. On 17 March 1998 the MNRPT had signed a Tenancy at Will agreement with Breckland District Council to take over the station and trackbed at County School. This agreement was to allow the railway to take control of the station until it could afford to buy it outright, and followed on from the removal of the remaining rolling stock associated with the defunct Great Eastern Railway (1989) Ltd from the site.

The original Dereham station was re-opened to passengers on Saturday 26 July 1997, with the first services being operated by 1890-built Manning Wardle 0-6-0T 'Sir Berkeley', hired from the Keighley and Worth Valley Railway. British Railways Board (Residuary) Limited transferred the line between Wymondham and Dereham to the MNRPT on 23 September 1997. The first preservation-era train to operate between Dereham and Wymondham ran on 8 February 1998, when a works train hauled by 20069 and Ruston & Hornsby 0-4-0 'County School ran as part of preparations for a March freight test train. The first commercial freight train operated on 8 July 1998.

Passenger services between Dereham and Wymondham commenced in 1999, with the opening of Wymondham Abbey railway station. The first passenger train to use the new station, on 2 May 1999, was operated by a Class 108 DMU. Thuxton station opened as a daylight hours only request halt at the same time, although Kimberley Park and Hardingham remained closed.

Following the completion of infrastructure work, such as the replacement of the water tower at Dereham and the provision of an inspection pit, steam passenger services returned to the Dereham to Wymondham Abbey section on Sunday 30 April 2006. These were operated by Great Western Railway pannier tank number 9466 from the Buckinghamshire Railway Centre. The ownership of the section of railway line between Dereham and North Elmham, part of that originally authorised by the Norfolk Railway Extensions (Dereham, Wells and Blakeney Branch) Act 1846 (9 & 10 Vict. c. clxix), was passed to the Mid-Norfolk Railway in October 2001.

Part of the line from County School to Wroxham is now the narrow gauge Bure Valley Railway. The formation between Wells and the religious centre of Walsingham now hosts the miniature Wells and Walsingham Light Railway. Both schemes are independent of the MNR. Another independent scheme, the "Norfolk Orbital Railway" plans to link the MNR to the North Norfolk Railway and the coast at Sheringham. In 2009, the Whitwell & Reepham Preservation Society announced an eventual intention to link up with either the North Norfolk Railway or Mid-Norfolk Railway.

The Mid-Norfolk Railway Preservation Trust is authorised by the Department for Transport to operate the railway in two statutory instruments, the Mid-Norfolk Railway Order 1997 (SI 1997/2262) and the Mid-Norfolk Railway Order 2001 (SI 2001/3413). The orders detail the length of track and level crossings over which the railway is permitted to operate trains (subject to safety inspections etc.) and refer to both the Norwich and Brandon Railway Act 1845 (8 & 9 Vict. c. cliv) and the Norfolk Railway Extensions (Dereham, Wells and Blakeney Branch) Act 1846. Planning consent for the restoration and operation of the remaining section to County School, which does not involve crossing any public rights of way but is to include the retention of a permissive footpath, was awarded in 1992.

== Present day ==
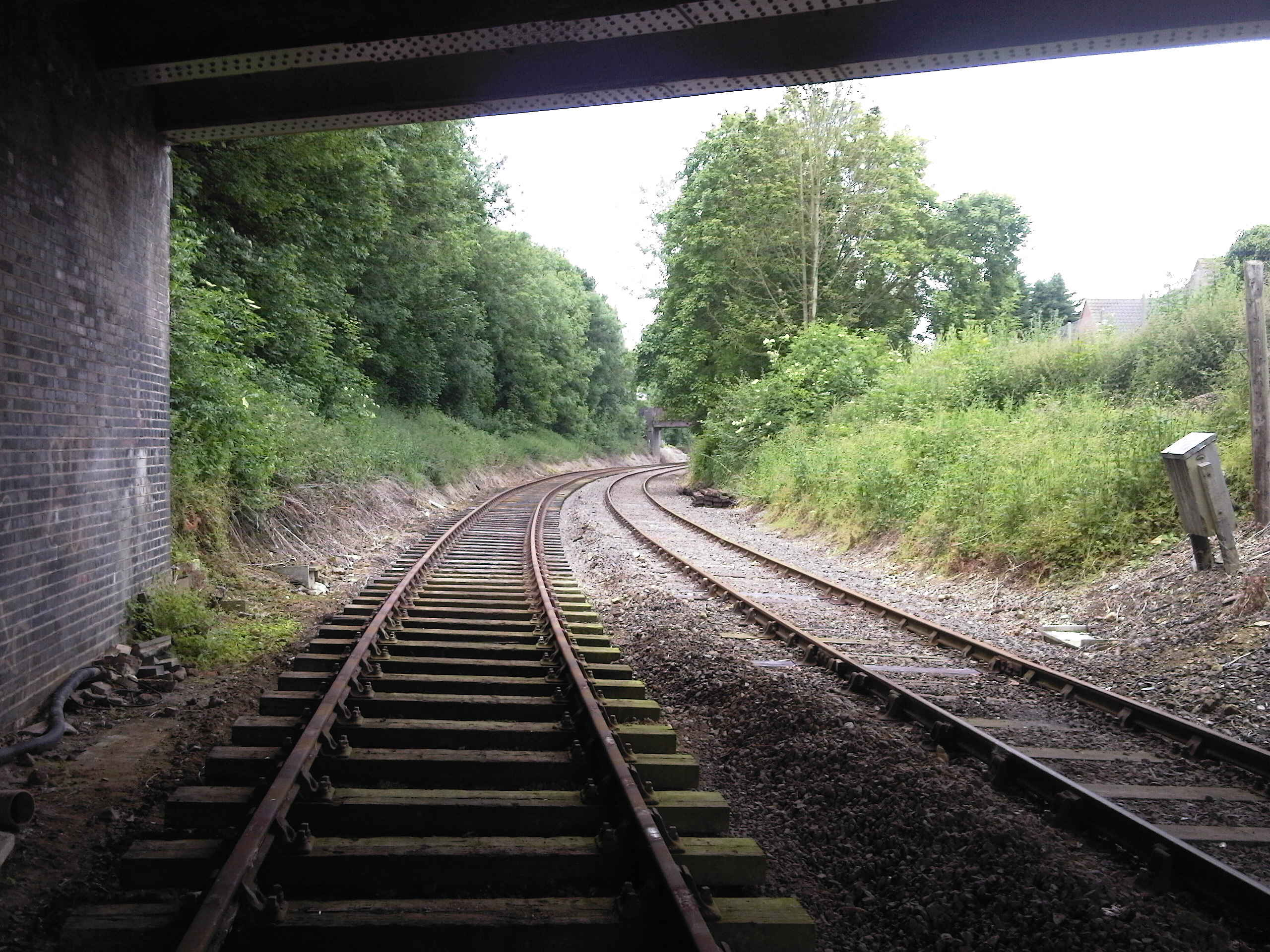
Bridge 1671, with visual effect of original double track restored, near Wymondham Abbey.

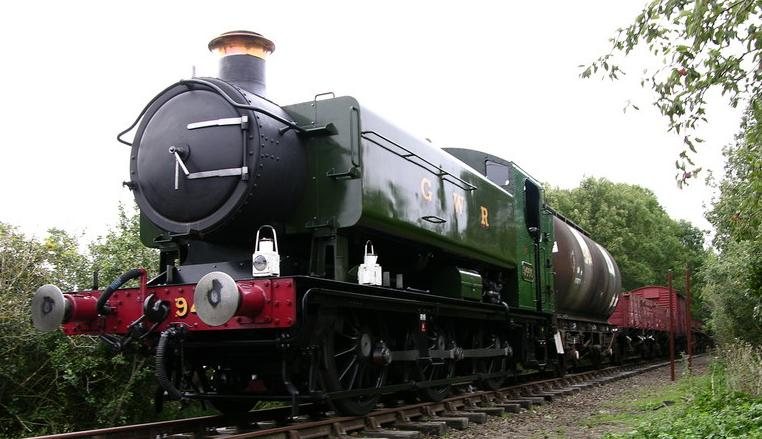
GWR 9400 Class No. 9466 at Hoe, 2009

GWR 6000 Class 6023 King Edward II on Danemoor Bank, 2011

The 11 1/2 miles (18.5 km) section of line between Dereham and Wymondham is in regular use, with a further 3 1/2 miles (5.6 km) to Worthing passed for operation, but only used for passengers during special events and for works trains enabling the reconditioning of the derelict line further north. The company also owns the next 2.5 miles (4.0 km) of disused line from Worthing to County School station near North Elmham, although a section of about one mile (1.6 km) lacks track between North Elmham and County School. This makes the Mid-Norfolk Railway one of the longest standard-gauge heritage railways in the United Kingdom. Beyond the railway's holding, the trackbed is mostly intact from County School to Fakenham, and is reserved by the council for railway use.

The MNR's preserved stations include Yaxham (which retains its original signal box and up platform buildings.), Thuxton, Hardingham, Kimberley Park and Wymondham Abbey. Trains hauled by both steam and diesel locomotives run on most weekends from the end of February to December, and on Wednesdays and Thursdays in summer. There are also various special events throughout the year.

=== Guest steam locomotives ===
Although predominantly diesel-operated, the MNR is not a diesel-only railway. The first train from Dereham after preservation, running between Dereham and Yaxham, was hauled by Manning Wardle 0-6-0ST tank locomotive "Sir Berkeley", and the railway has always intended to operate both steam and diesel trains.

In 2000, the railway arranged the loan of Barclay 0-4-0ST 'Little Barford'. Although the locomotive was too small to operate a scheduled service over the line it was used for a number of crew training runs, and, on Monday 12 June 2000, it became the first steam locomotive in preservation to operate over the entire route between Dereham and Wymondham. Steam also visited the line, although not to operate services, in 2001 when LNER Thompson Class B1 61264 was routed via Dereham for repairs after failing on railtour at Norwich, 20 November.

The 2006 return of steam-hauled passenger services marked the completion of Dereham Station restoration and the installation of steam infrastructure (such as the water tower).

The first locomotive to haul timetabled steam services over the Dereham to Wymondham section since 1955 was GWR 9400 Class 9466. The same locomotive returned to operate the line's steam services in June and July 2007, although Battle of Britain class 34067 Tangmere also visited this year, operating some scheduled trains and hauling the first steam charter from Dereham (to London Liverpool Street), on 5 May. Steam services have continued to operate during summer months.

=== Network Rail connections ===
==== Commercial freight ====
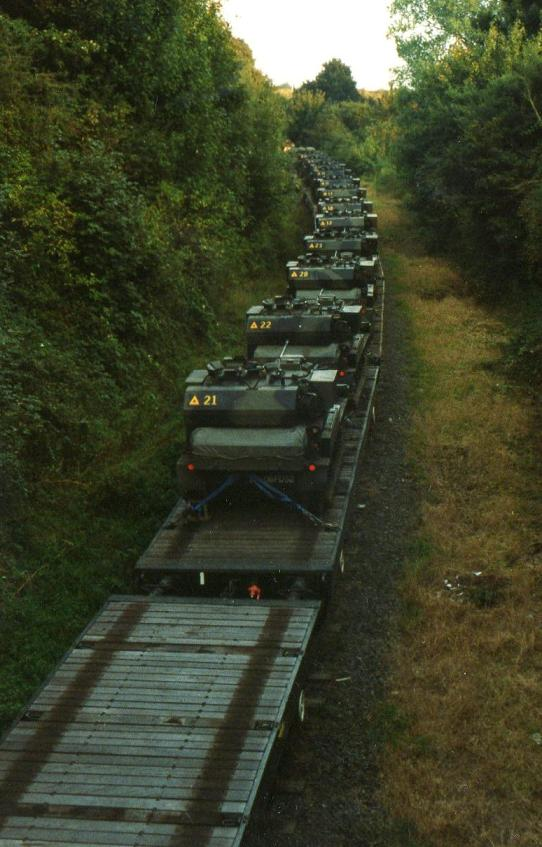
Trainload of Scimitar light tanks

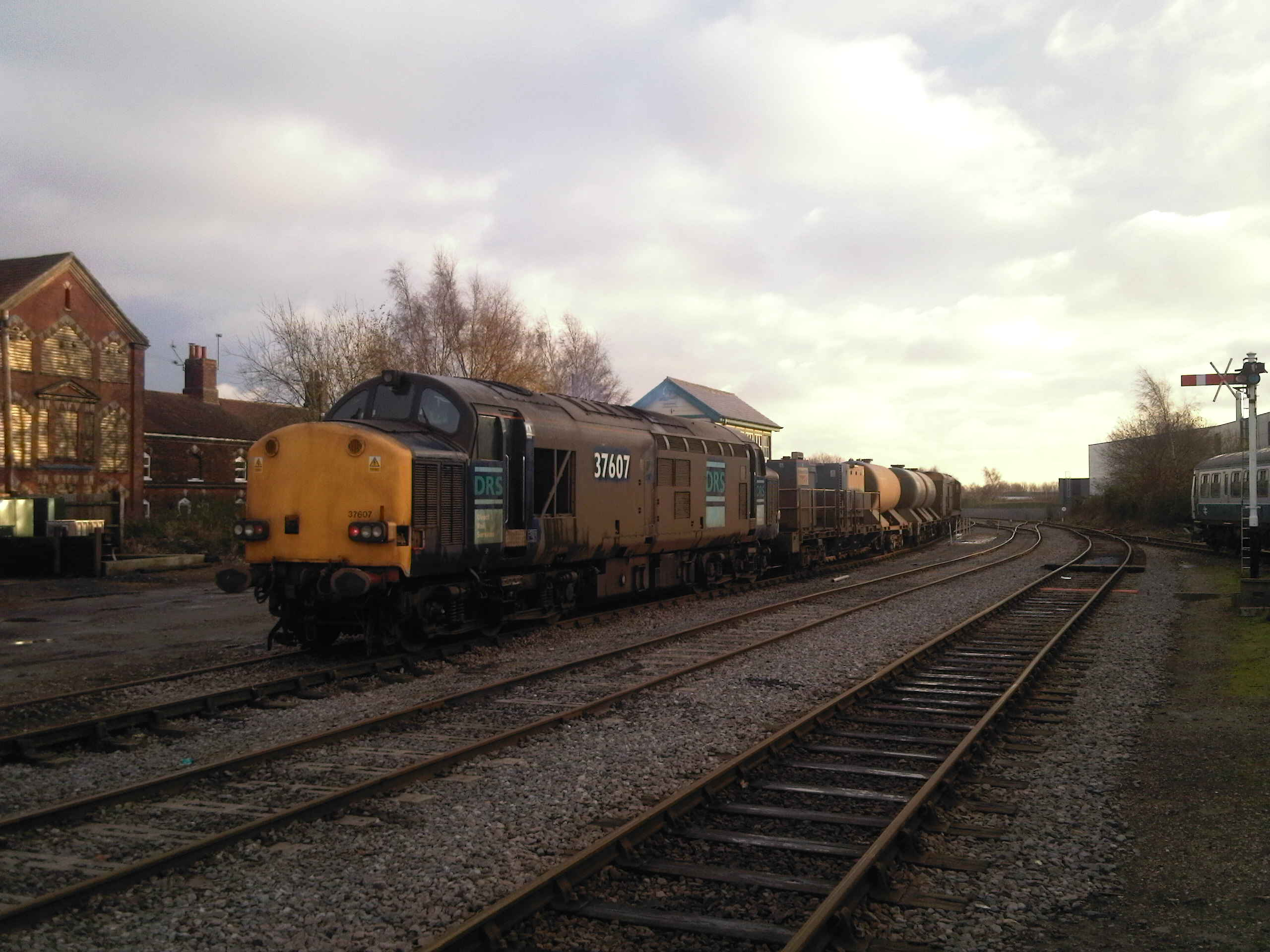
DRS Class 37 and Rail Head Treatment Train at Dereham (2008)

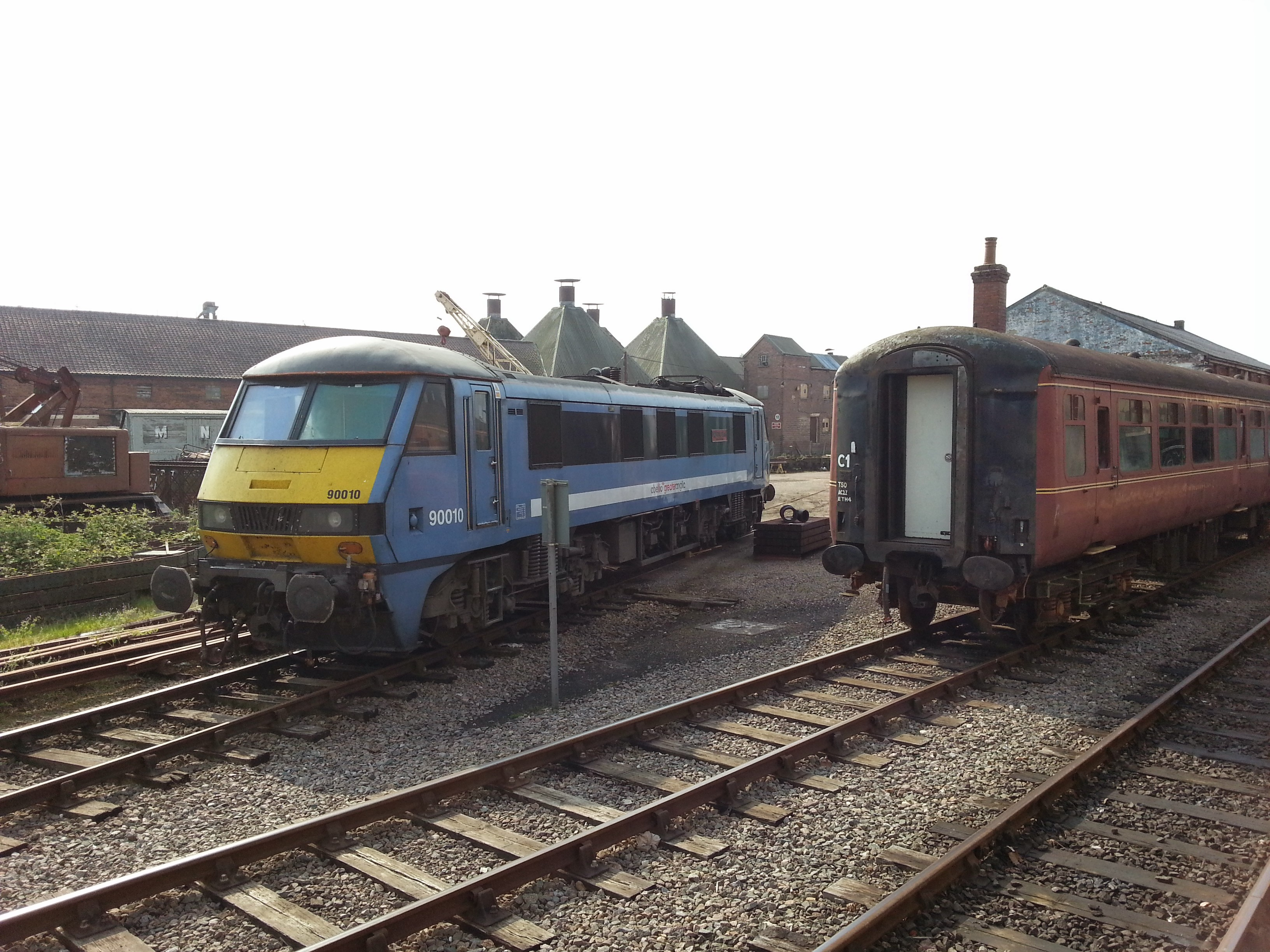
90010 at Dereham in May 2014

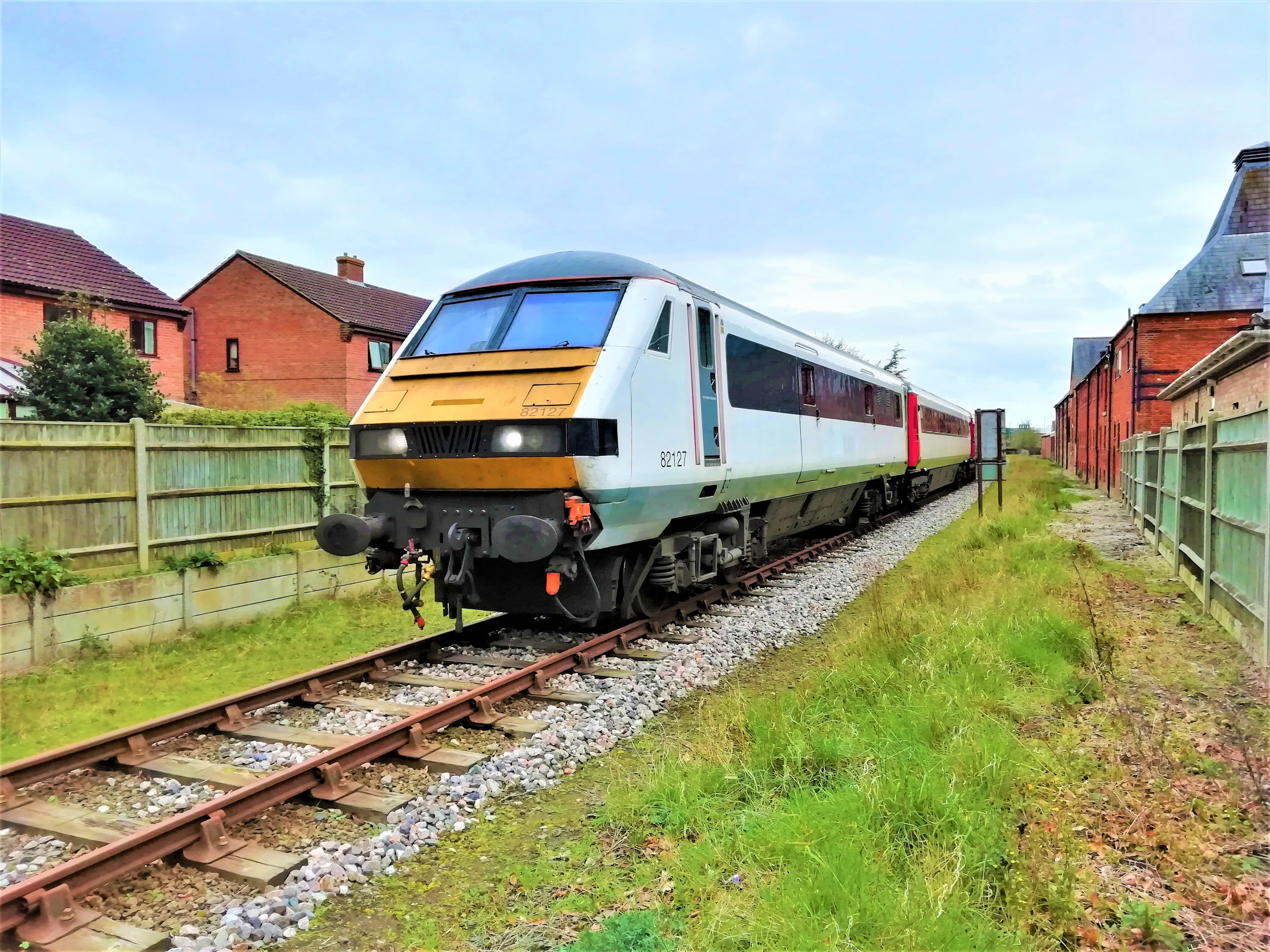
Stored DVT 82127 north of Dereham station, 2020

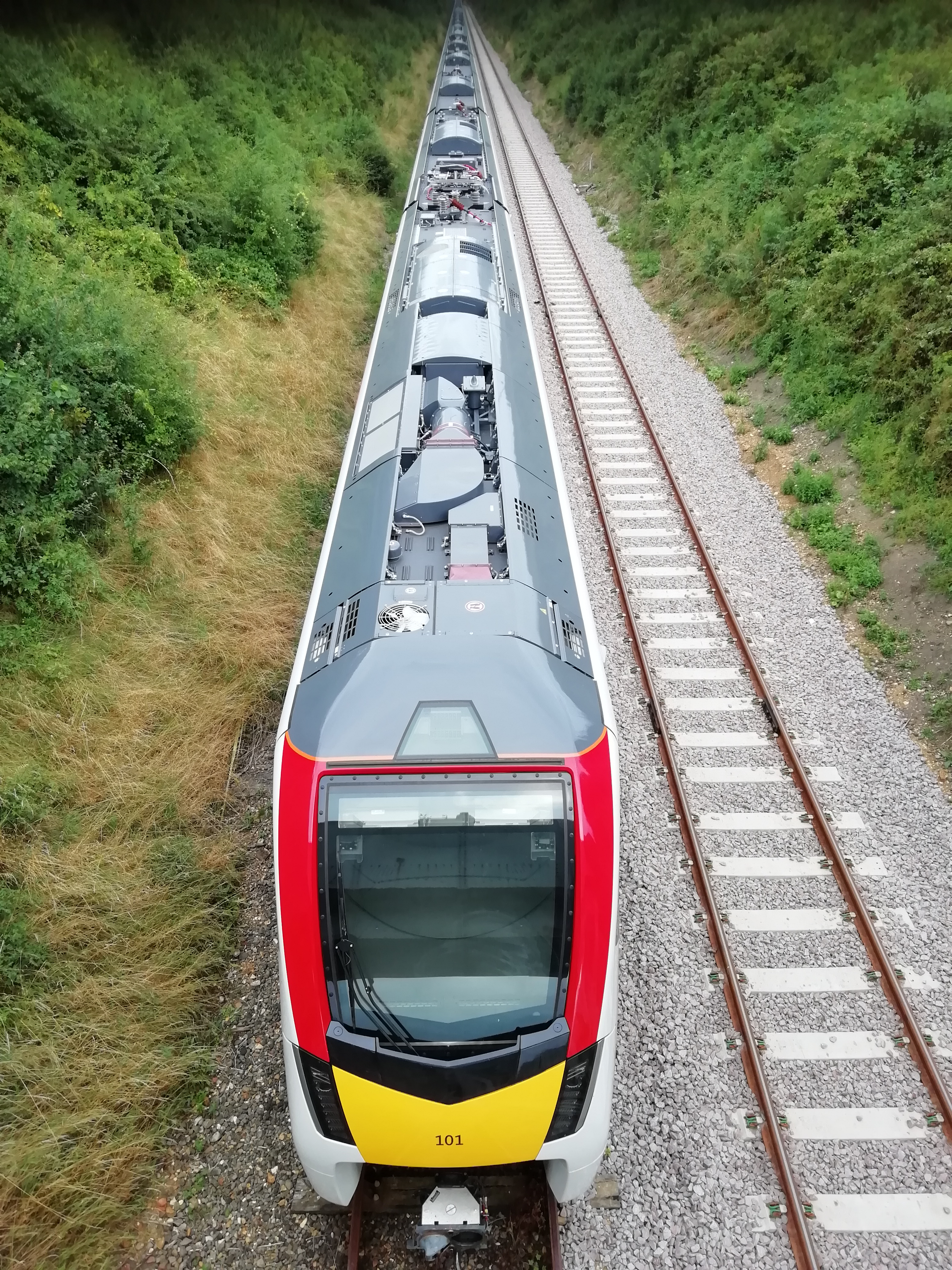
Class 745/1 units stored on the Mid-Norfolk Railway prior to entering service.

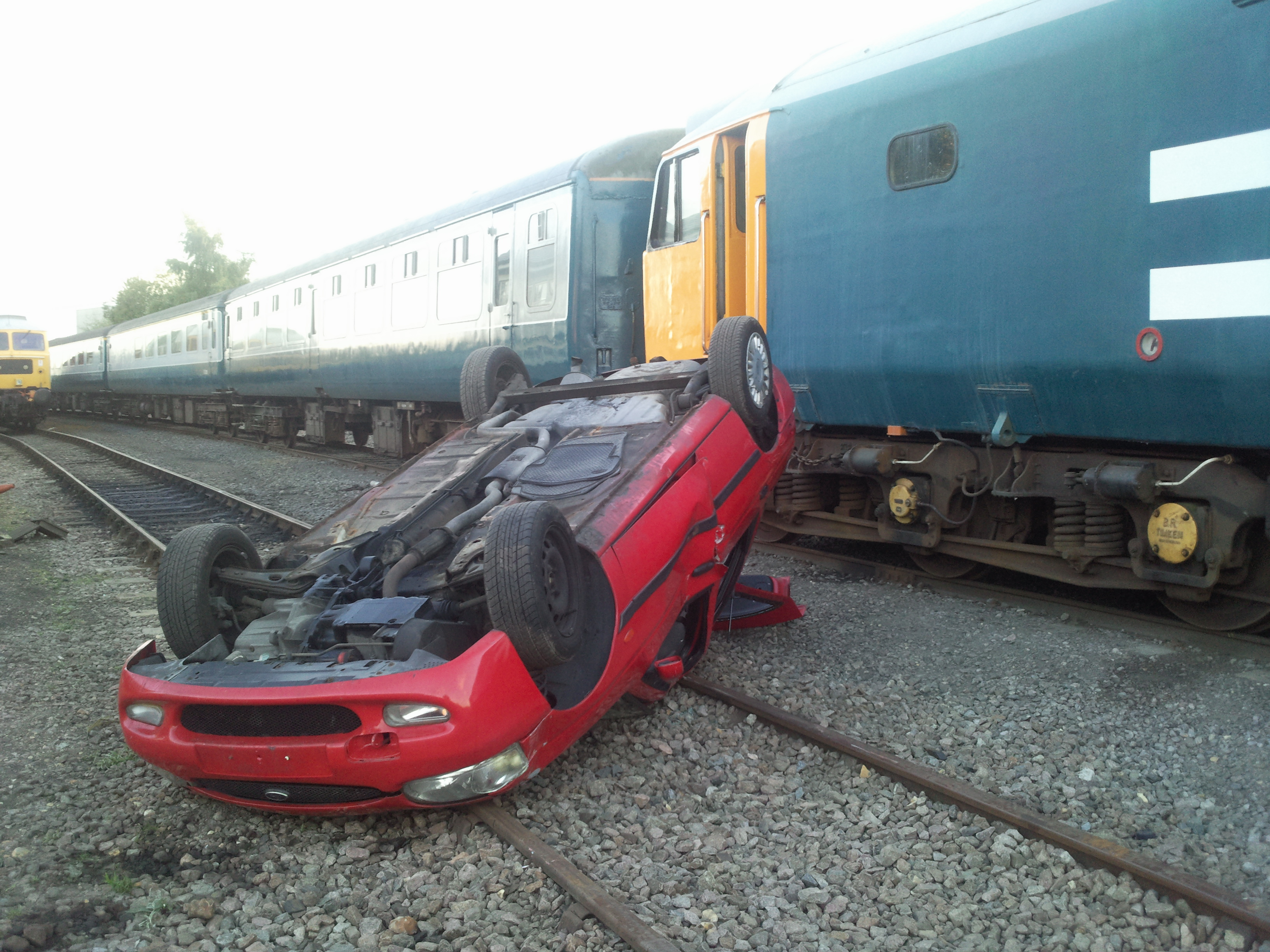
Staged incident at Dereham for Norfolk Fire and Rescue

Mid-Norfolk Railway facilitates commercial freight trains, using its connection with the National Rail network at Wymondham. Dereham yard has been used as a servicing depot by Direct Rail Services since 2007 and for storage of Network Rail track plant since 2008.

The road vehicle loading ramp in Dereham yard is used by mainline train operators to load damaged rolling stock onto road vehicles. Such rolling stock usually comes at night (via the connection with the mainline at Wymondham) at slow speed (sometimes on wheelskates) from Crown Point TMD in Norwich (where no road-rail loading facilities are available) for onward road movement to specialist repair facilities around the country.

The line has also been used to carry equipment for army units based at Robertson Barracks or undergoing training at the Stanford Training Area, most recently in March 2020. Operation of these trains involves both resident and mainline locomotives.

North Norfolk District Council have listed Fakenham and Great Ryburgh as potential freight hubs, subject to them being linked to the Mid-Norfolk Railway at County School.

| Date | Operator | Motive Power | Notes |
|---|---|---|---|
| 17 June 1998 | EWS | 47241 'Halewood Silver Jubilee' | First trial MOD train, including inspection saloon. |
| 8 July 1998 | EWS | 37263 | First MOD train, composed VGA wagons. |
| 9 July 1998 | EWS | 47298 | MOD train, composed Warwell and Warflat wagons. |
| 17 July 1998 | EWS | 37707 | MOD train, composed VGA, Warwell and Warflat wagons. |
| 5 October 1998 | EWS | 47200 'Herbert Austin' | MOD train, composed VGA wagons. |
| 8 October 1998 | EWS | 47312 'Parsec of Europe' | MOD train, composed Warwell and Warflat wagons. |
| 15 October 1998 | EWS | 47316 | MOD train, composed Warwell and Warflat wagons. |
| 23 April 1999 | EWS | 37248 'Midland Railway Centre' + 37178 | MOD train, composed VGA, Warwell and Warflat wagons. |
| 20 January 2002 | EWS | 47786 'Roy Castle OBE' | Transfer of fire damaged 86252 from Norwich. |
| 26 September 2008 | EWS | 66105 | Trial MOD train. |
| 8 January 2009 | DB Schenker | 66157 | MOD train, composed VGA, Warwell and Warflat wagons. |
| 8 January 2009 | DRS | 37087 | Collecting Network Rail stoneblower. |
| 28 November 2009 | DB Schenker | 66201 | MOD train, composed VGA, Warwell and Warflat wagons. |
| 3 March 2020 | GB Railfreight | 66778 'Cambois Depot 25 Years' | MOD train, 6Z80 Ludgershall MOD – Dereham |

Commercial works trains operated on the line between 2018 and 2019, in conjunction with the Kimberley and Hardingham storage project. These were operated by a number of locomotives hired in for the purpose. These included BR Standard Class 4 2-6-4T steam locomotive 80078, BR Class 03 03197 and BR Class 33 33202.

==== Storage of mainline stock ====
Working with Abellio Greater Anglia, the Mid-Norfolk Railway developed a rolling stock storage facility close to their Kimberley Park station. The £3 million sidings were funded by Abellio Greater Anglia to allow them to store their Class 745 and 755 fleets until they were ready to be in service.

==== Training and testing ====
The Mid-Norfolk Railway is frequently used by mainline companies for crew training and the storage and testing of recommissioned and new on-track plant, including ballast tampers, ballast regulators, stoneblowers and Multi-Purpose Vehicles from companies including Network Rail and Balfour Beatty Rail Ltd. Since 2001 the line has been used annually for low adhesion training, or skidpan training, for crews from Anglia Railways, latterly for National Express East Anglia, where a specially fitted Class 153 treats the track with a slimy solution before the crew practices stopping in a virtual station.

The line has also been used for training exercises by East of England Ambulance Service, Norfolk Police and the Fire Brigade, including major incident training involving air ambulances.

==== Charter trains ====
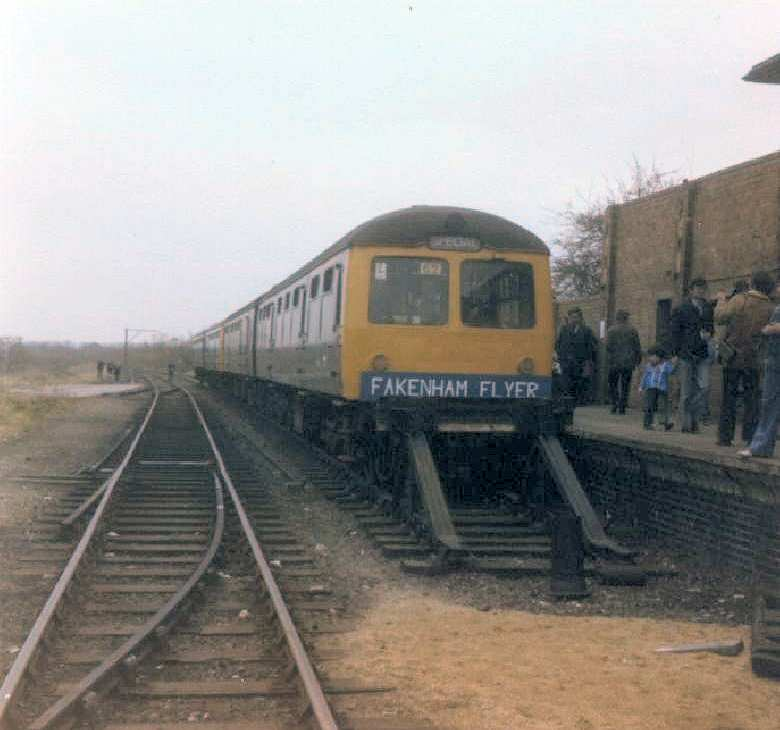
1979 charter DMU at Fakenham

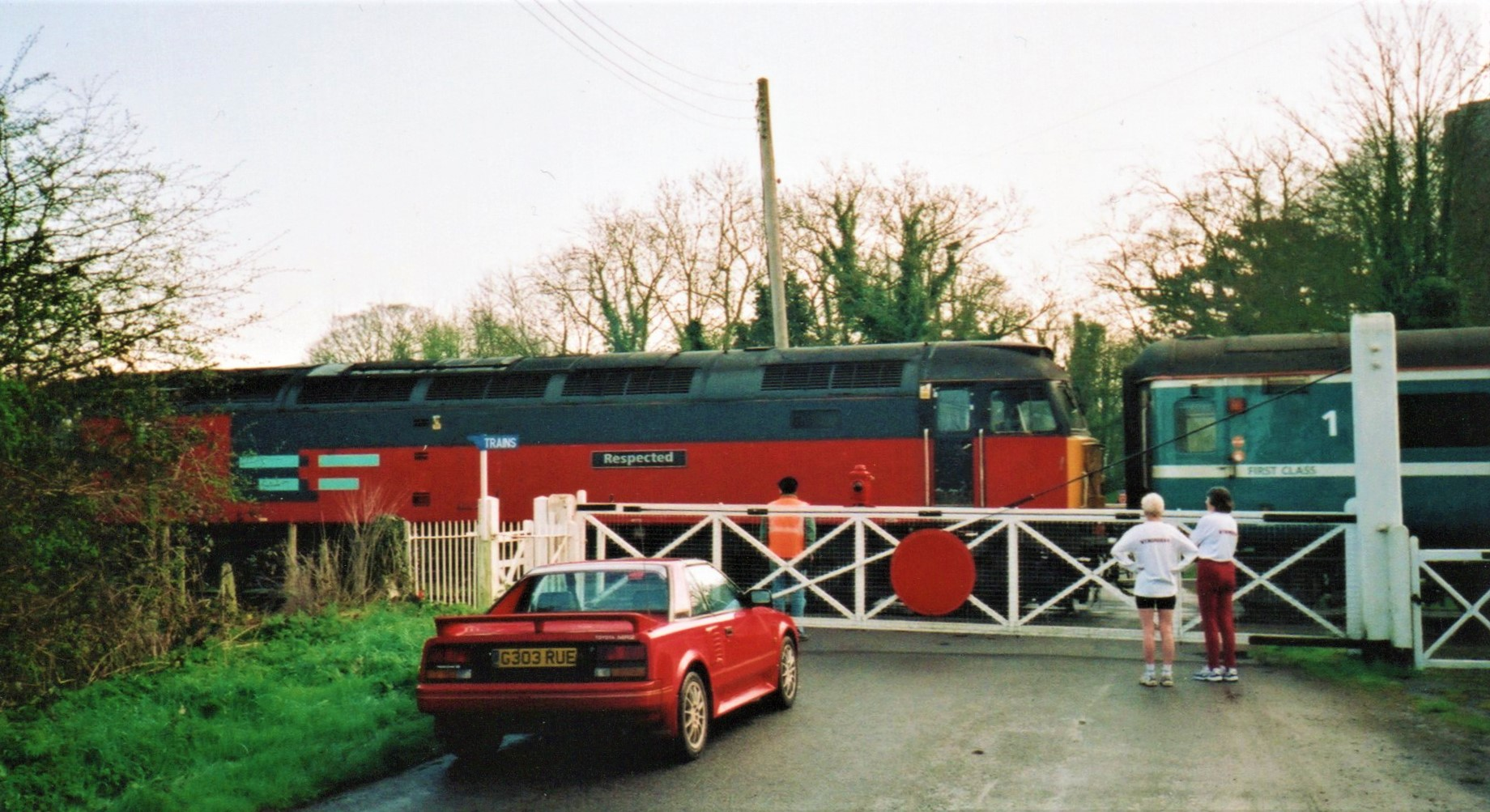
2001 NENTA charter train at Wymondham

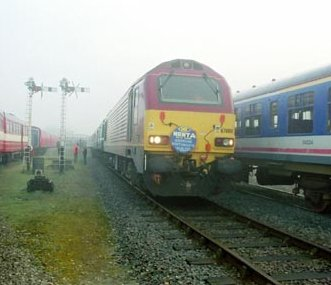
2003 charter train at Dereham

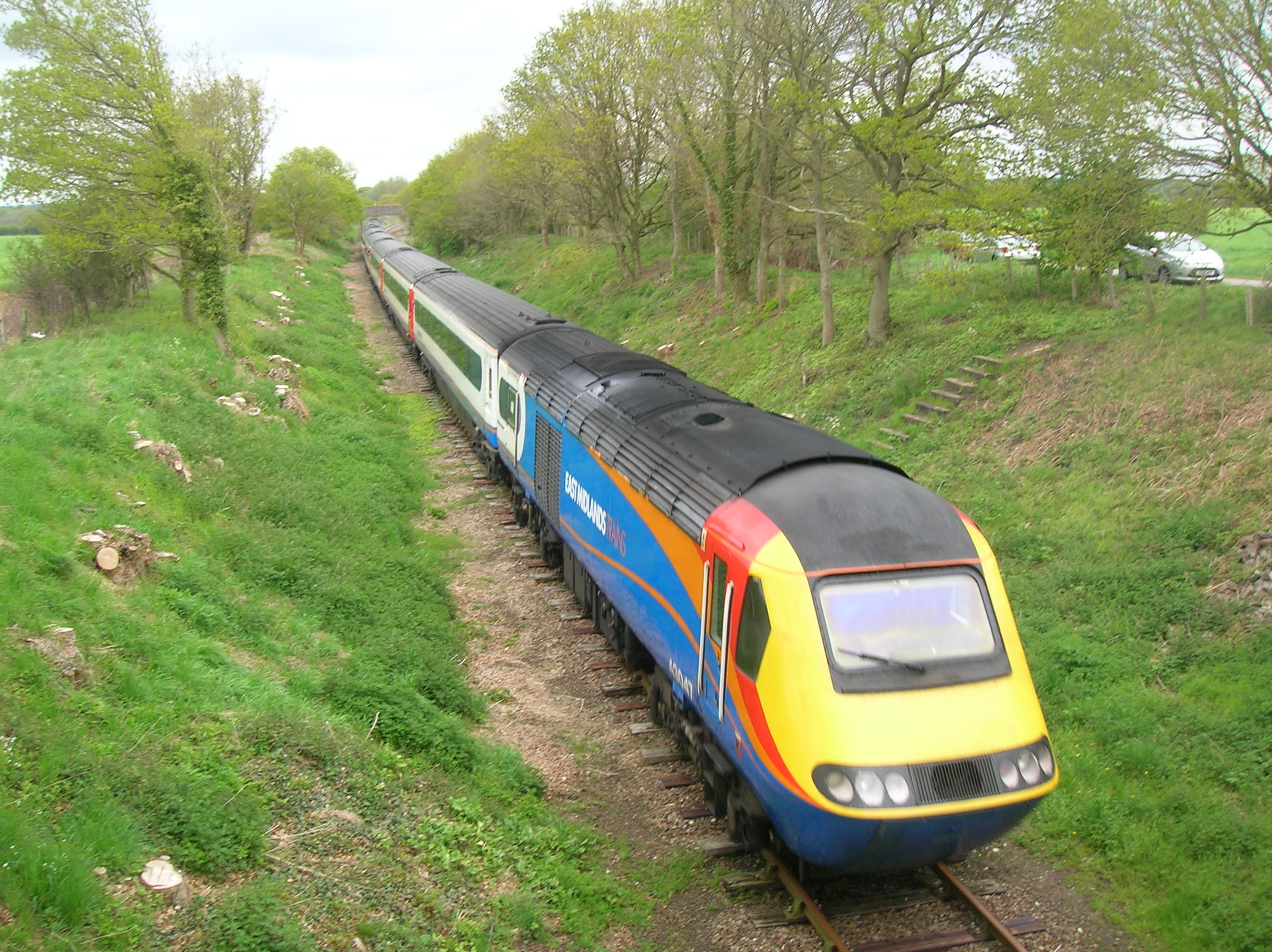
2013 charter train at Hoe

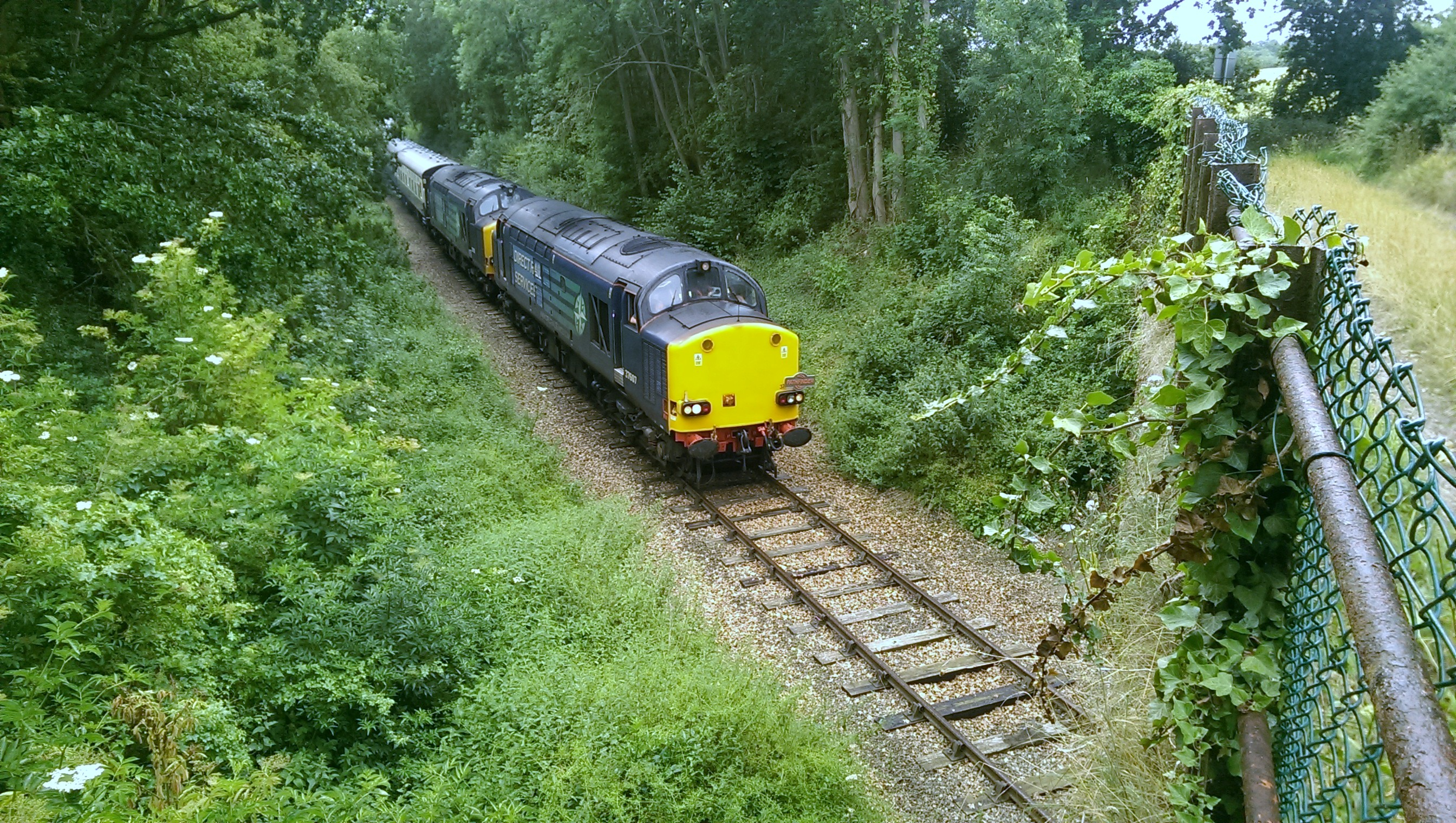
Class 37-hauled charter approaching Hoe, 2015

Before the preservation of the line, a number of special trains and demonstration services were operated over the line by the Wymondham & Dereham Rail Action Committee (WyDRAC) and the Railway Development Society (RDS) to help maintain pressure for the restoration of passenger services over the line. By the line's closure, twenty special trains had operated, carrying over 5,000 passengers.

The junction with the main line at Wymondham has allowed the Mid-Norfolk Railway to continue to be used by a number of charter and excursion trains, which operate over the line as part of the wider rail network.

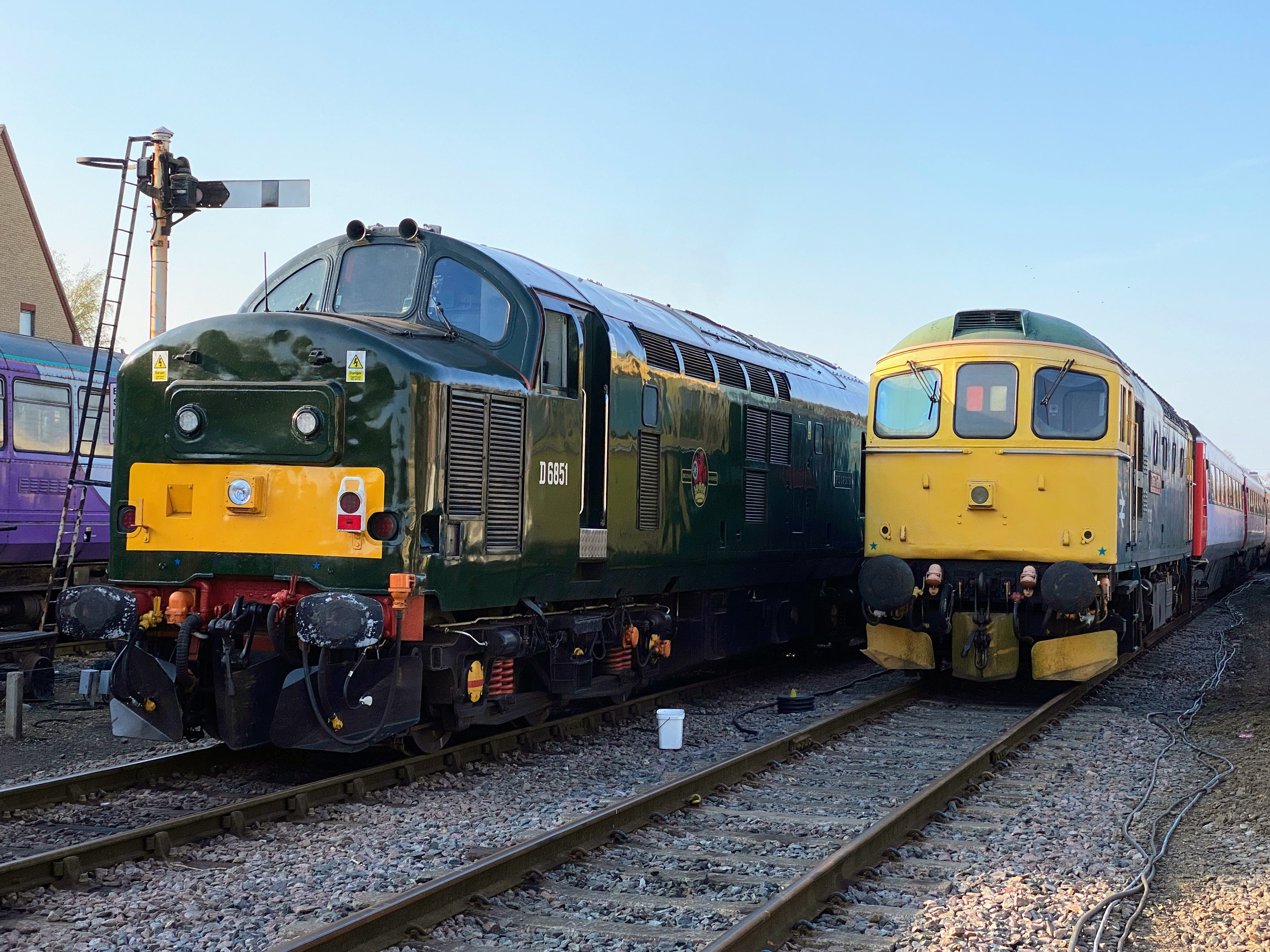
37667 'Flopsie' & 33202 'Dennis G Robinson' stand at Dereham Station on a private LSL Charter, 2022.

| Date | Operator | Motive Power | Notes |
|---|---|---|---|
| 8 May 1999 | Hertfordshire Rail Tours | 47747 'Res Publica' & 47772 | King's Cross to Dereham excursion. |
| 21 April 2001 | NENTA | 47746 'The Bobby' & 47776 'Respected' | Dereham to York excursion. |
| 20 April 2002 | NENTA | 47749 'Atlantic College' & 67008 | Dereham to Portsmouth excursion. |
| 31 August 2002 | NENTA | 67006 & 67021 | Norwich – Dereham to Bristol excursion. |
| 23 November 2002 | Hertfordshire Rail Tours | 47741 'Resilient' & 66086 | King's Cross to Dereham excursion. |
| 17 May 2003 | NENTA | 67006 & 67016 | Dereham to York, Durham or Newcastle excursion. |
| 2 August 2003 | NENTA | 47778 'Duke of Edinburgh's Award' & 67026 | Dereham to Severn Valley Railway excursion. |
| 22 November 2003 | Hertfordshire Rail Tours | 67008 & 67009 | King's Cross to Dereham excursion. |
| 21 August 2004 | NENTA | 47703 & 47832 | Dereham to Chester excursion. |
| 9 September 2006 | NENTA | 47703 & 47709 | Dereham to Scarborough excursion. |
| 5 May 2007 | The Railway Touring Company | 34067 'Tangmere' & 47812 | Norwich to Dereham excursion. |
| 11 August 2007 | NENTA | 47805 & 47853 | Dereham to Weymouth excursion. |
| 26 March 2011 | Hastings Diesels Ltd | 1001 | Hastings via Tonbridge, East Croydon, Barnes, West Hampstead, Hitchin, Cambridge, Ely and Wymondham to Dereham. |
| 14 May 2011 | UK Railtours / East Midland Trains | 43075/43082 'The Railway Children' | London St. Pancras via the Leicester, Peterborough, Ely and Wymondham to Dereham. |
| 18 May 2013 | UK Railtours / East Midland Trains | 43047/43055 | London St. Pancras via Leicester, Peterborough, Ely and Wymondham to Dereham (and then north of Hoe Level Crossing). |
| 10 August 2013 | Charity Railtours | 60054/37605 & 37611 | Eastleigh to the Port of Felixstowe via Wymondham Abbey. Train did not go north of Wymondham Abbey. |
| 8 March 2014 | Pathfinder Railtours | 37402, 37409 and 37218 | Railtour from Crewe to Hoe via Wymondham and Dereham. |
| 21 June 2014 | NENTA | 47851 and 47580 County of Essex | Dereham – Norwich – Wymondham – Attleborough – Thetford – Brandon – Ely – March – Peterborough – Doncaster – York – Malton – Scarborough and return. |
| 9 September 2014 | The Royal Scotsman | 47854 and 57313 | Scarborough to Dereham |
| 10 September 2014 | The Royal Scotsman | 47854 and 57313 | Dereham to Nene Valley Railway |
| 4 July 2015 | NENTA | 47851 and 47804 | Dereham to Bristol |
| 8 July 2015 | Pathfinder Railtours | 37607/37612 and 37059 | Bristol to Hoe |
| 4 July 2019 | Steam Dreams | 61306 "Mayflower" | London Liverpool Street to Dereham |
| 15-16 April 2022 | Locomotive Services Limited (Private Charter) | 37688 'Great Rock' and 37667 'Flopsie' | Nene Valley Railway to Dereham (15 April 2022) & Dereham to Stowmarket (16 April 2022) |

=== Television, film and theatre use ===
'Allo 'Allo at County School

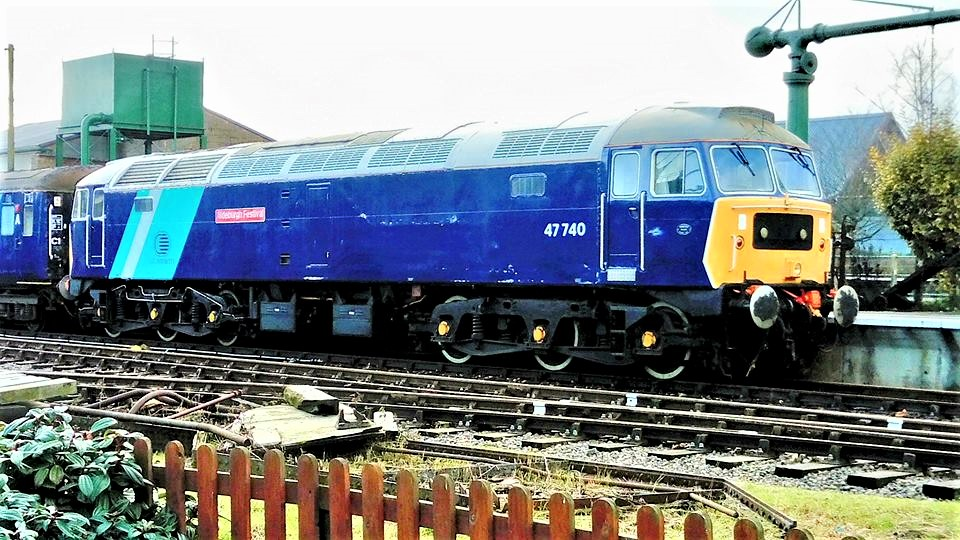
"Bodyguard" at Dereham

After passenger closure, County School station was used as the set for Weavers Green station in the Anglia Television soap opera of the same name. The same station, heavily disguised, featured as "Gare de Nouvion" (Nouvion railway station) in the penultimate episode of 'Allo 'Allo!, the comedy series set in occupied France (see picture).

An episode of Off the Rails made for Discovery Channel in 2001 featured some to the activities and volunteers on the railway.

In February 2004 County School stood in for Thetford station in a documentary about the arrival of American troops in World War II, and in September 2005 the same location was used by Capriol Films for the film "Peter Warlock, Some Little Joy" about composer Philip Heseltine. Dereham station, with the railway's Mark 2 coaches, featured in a minor film and the line has also appeared in documentaries for local and national television.

In 2010 former Conservative cabinet minister turned broadcaster and writer Michael Portillo visited the railway to film material for an episode in the second series of the BBC series Great British Railway Journeys. The filming used the Mid-Norfolk's green liveried 1957-built two carriage Class 101 Diesel Multiple Unit.

In 2012 Dereham railway station was used as a stage for productions of the musical The Railway Children, 2016 saw the line and Dereham station featured as "Fallmarsh" station in horror film 'Possum', and the line was used for the filming of the opening scenes of BBC drama Bodyguard in 2018. In the same year, Dereham station was also used as a location for a German advert for Leffe beer.

Mumbai-based Reliance Entertainment filmed a Bollywood version of The Girl on the Train at Dereham station in August 2019.

=== Community railway ===
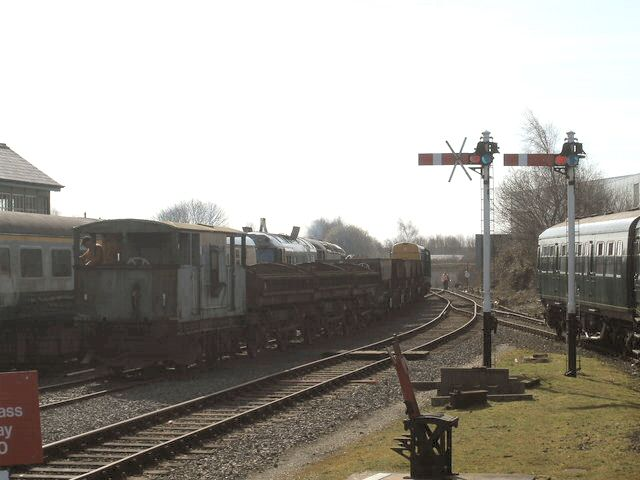
The yard at Dereham

The Mid-Norfolk Railway was established as a multi-functional line, with an intention to operate a community service in addition to tourist and freight services. The railway has also stated their belief that a commuter service between Dereham and Norwich remains a viable proposition, with the MNR either running the service themselves or working with an existing train operator. One obstacle on the MNR to running such services is the requirement to operate five manual gated level crossings between Dereham and Wymondham, although level crossing automation is a possibility in the future.

In June 2009 the Association of Train Operating Companies published a document (Connecting Communities: Expanding Access to the Rail Network) calling for the restoration of services on a variety of former branch lines, including the Dereham branch. This £30m proposal would see regular services restored between Dereham and Norwich, operated subject to agreement with the Mid-Norfolk Railway Preservation Trust.

In 2020, the railway announced that they had, in association with partner organisations including Greater Anglia, Norfolk County Council, Breckland District Council and the New Anglia Local Enterprise Partnership, bid for funding for a feasibility study into reopening the line for regular commuter services over their route. The plans to restore the line, and potentially extend it to Fakenham in time, have been backed by the George Freeman, MP for Mid-Norfolk. In June 2021, a bid was submitted to restore the Wymondham-Dereham line as part of the second round of the Restoring Your Railway fund. It was unsuccessful. A bid was re-submitted for the third round

In another role within the community, the railway has become a focus point for vintage rallies and other special events. During the 2020 COVID-19 pandemic, Dereham station was used as a venue for medical testing.

=== Awards ===
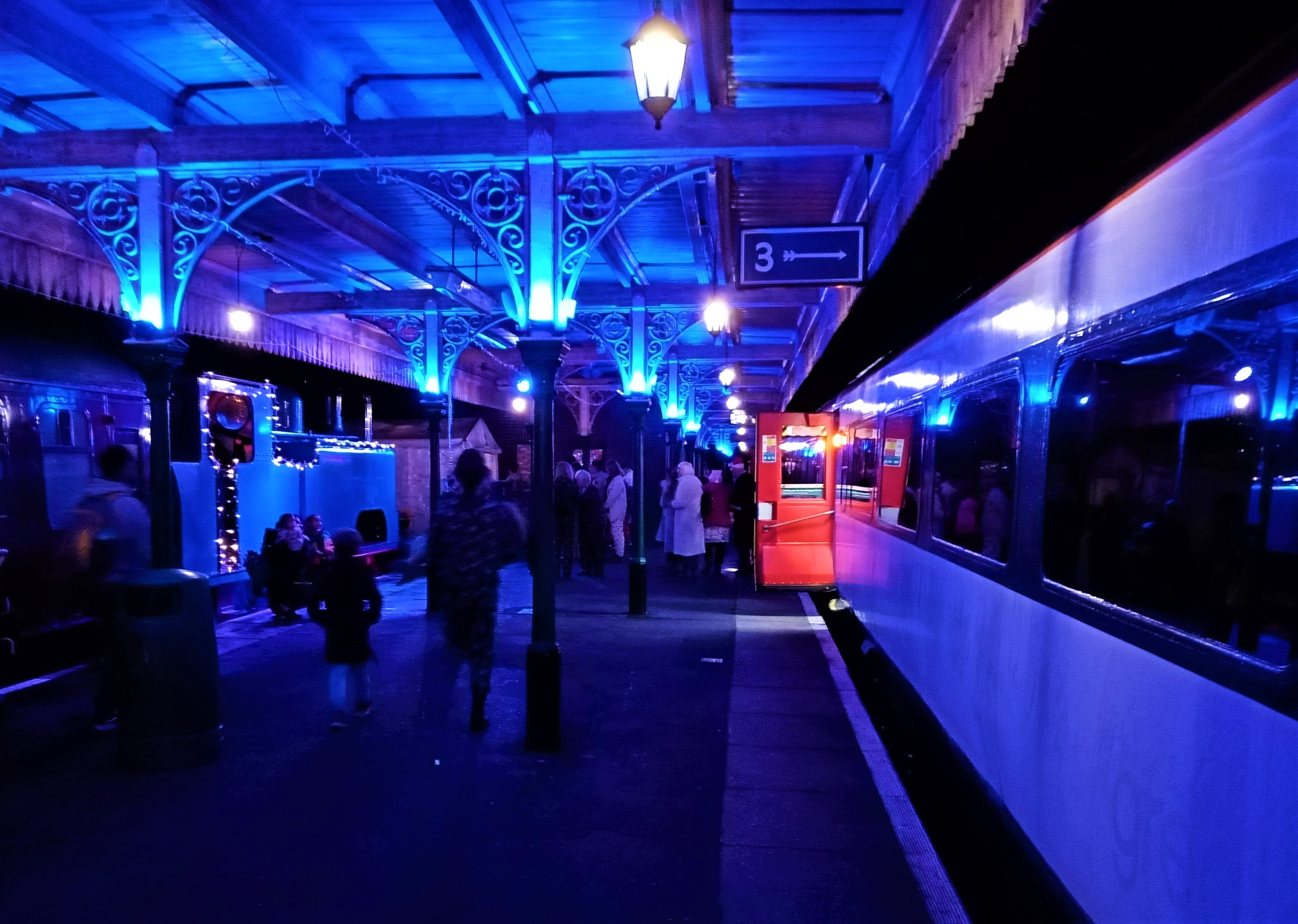
The Polar Express Train Ride at Dereham station

- County School station was presented with a Highly Commended certificate in the 1990 Ian Allan National Heritage Railway Awards.
- Hardingham station was awarded the Ian Allan Heritage Award in 2001.
- In 2012 the railway was awarded the Heritage Railway Association's Modern Traction Award for "its continued excellence in specialising in the operation of 1970s stock in BR 1970s livery, culminating in a significant bringing together of Nine Class 47 locomotives, approximately 10% of the surviving fleet".
- In December 2013 the railway was awarded the Ian Allan Heritage Railway of the Year Award 2013.
- In the Primary Times Family Star Awards 2019, the Mid-Norfolk Railway's Polar Express Train Ride was voted Runner Up, Seasonal Event of the Year.

=== Accidents ===
- On 20 March 2011 a car collided with the level crossing gates at Kimberley Park station, demolishing the south gate.
- On Wednesday 7 September 2011 a loaded passenger train collided with a lorry on the Greens Lane un-gated level crossing in Dereham. Nobody was injured in the collision and the train was able to complete its journey after a 45-minute delay.
- On 30 June 2012 GWR steam locomotive 9466 collided with stabled Class 20 diesel D8069 causing damage that the MNR estimated at the time could have run to hundreds of thousands of pounds to repair. No-one was injured.
- On 20 December 2020, a rail vehicle being delivered by a road haulier detached from their winch rope, breaking through a level crossing gate and ending up resting on the level crossing.

== Route details ==
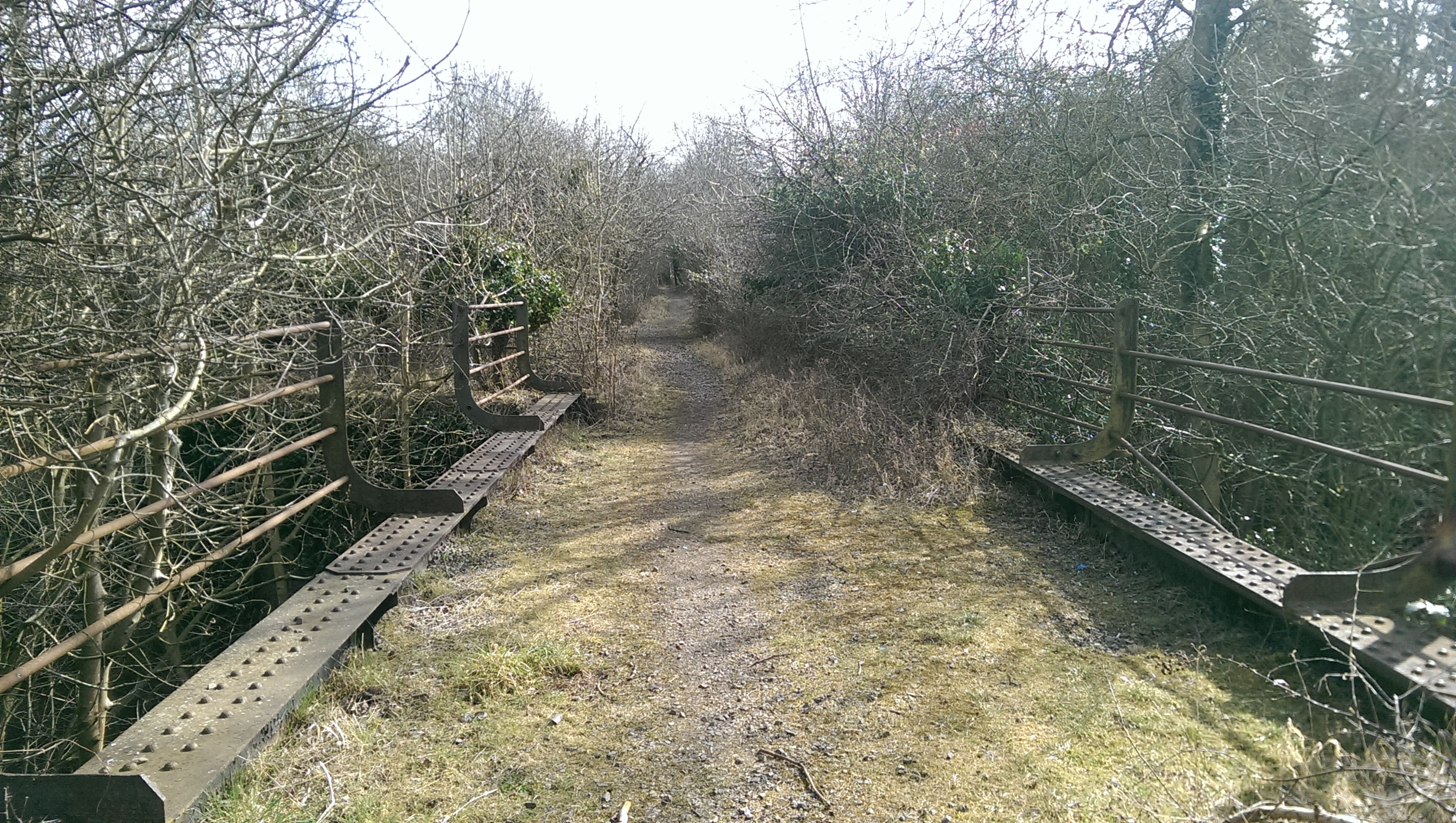
Formation near Fakenham, owned by the Norfolk Orbital Railway

Heading south from the former station site at Fakenham, the route of the line passes over the former Midland & Great Northern route to King's Lynn. Published plans would see a spur, proposed during the original construction of the latter line, being constructed enabling a new station to be located close to the town's former gas works. The line then passes over the River Wensum, with this first section being owned by the Norfolk Orbital Railway, in readiness for future restoration. At this time, it is open to the public as a permissive footpath.

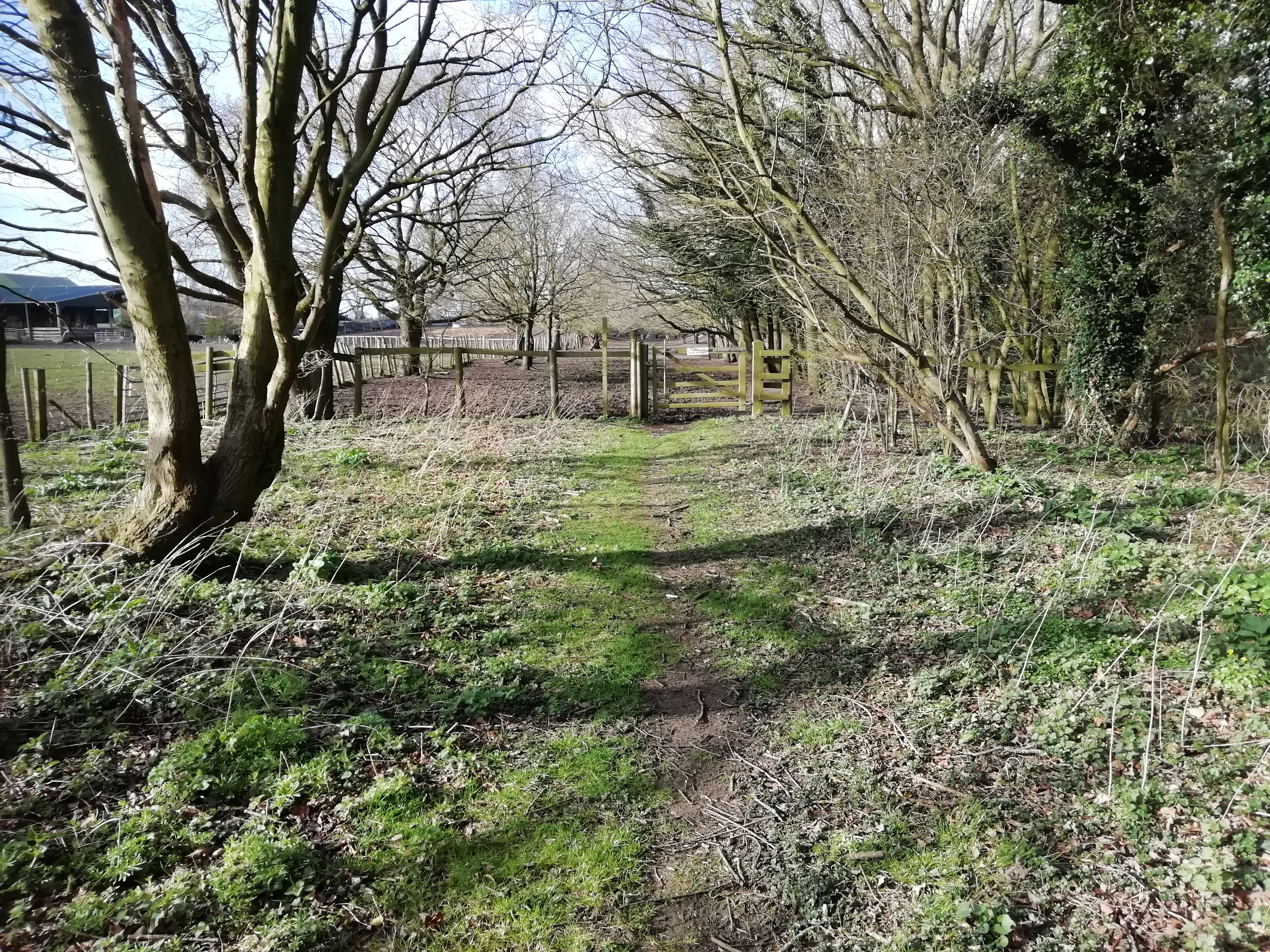
The northern boundary of the Mid-Norfolk Railway

The formation then passes along the rear boundary fence of the Pensthorpe Natural Park. After final closure in 1981 the platform at Ryburgh was cut back and the formation is blocked by temporary maltings structures and a private access driveway. The closure of the station was raised in the House of Commons due to concerns about whether the roads could cope with the volume of goods sent from the local maltings. This five mile section is not in rail ownership, but a section south of Great Ryburgh is open as a permissive footpath.

Although the line south of Great Ryburgh station is partially in use as a permissive footpath, two bridge decks have been removed and the section between these, running through Sennowe Park, is not open to the public. The formation is subject to Policy CT7 of Norfolk County Council's adopted Core Strategy, with the track route corridor from Fakenham through to County school, the Northern station on the Mid-Norfolk railway being safeguarded for rail use. The railway line between bridge 1708 and the MNR boundary at Yarrow Lane level crossing is a Public Bridleway.

The Mid-Norfolk Railway Preservation Trust owned trackbed starts north of Yarrow Lane level crossing, in the Wensum valley; a designated Site of Special Scientific Interest and a Candidate Special Area of Conservation, taking a roughly southerly direction.

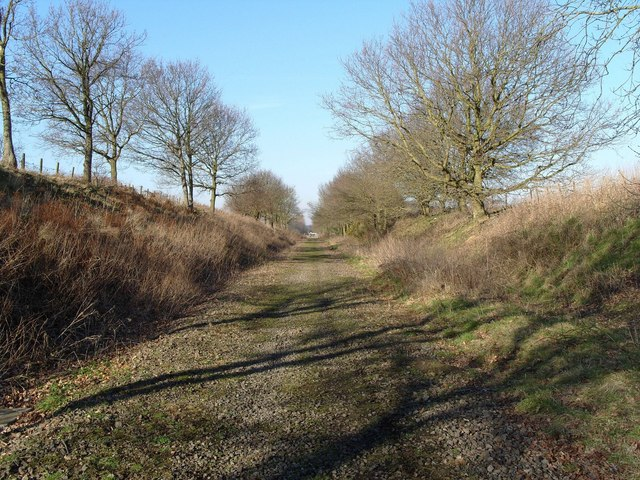
Formation near County School, owned by the Mid-Norfolk Railway

The line south of the County School station is in the ownership of the Mid-Norfolk Railway Preservation Trust, and has been partially relayed following planning consent for the restoration and operation of the line being granted in 1992. A one-mile gap remains between the Mid-Norfolk's tracks at North Elmham and the relayed MNR track at County School, which much of the latter likely to also need to be replaced prior to the restoration of train services. The line runs through the Wensum Valley, with the only level crossing on this section being on a private road owned by the railway company, and no public highways being crossed.

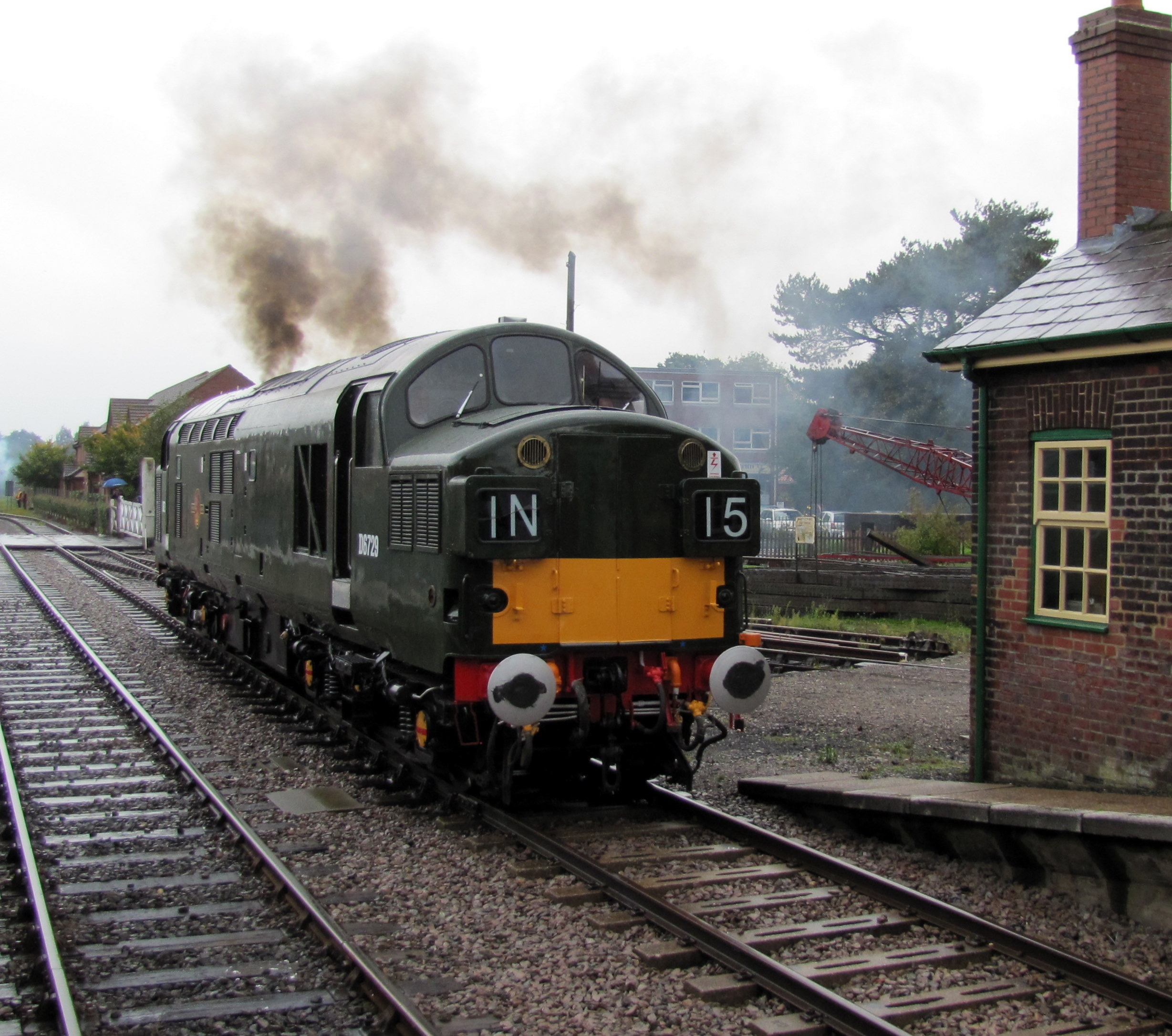
Class 37 approaching Dereham station, 2010

After passing the remains of North Elmham station the line becomes operational, and runs to the rear of the historic RAF Swanton Morley, before passing the hamlet of Hoe before entering Dereham. There are six public road level crossings and several bridges on this section. The section is rarely in passenger use as no stations are open to passengers, and due to the lack of signalling systems in Dereham. This section of line climbs out of the Wensum valley and enters the town of Dereham, passing two of the town's former maltings, including the Grade II* listed Crisps Malting buildings.

After passing through the company's headquarters at Dereham station, the line runs through the town and open fields, passing over the River Tud, before arriving at the nearby village of Yaxham. This was the first section of the railway restored by the Mid-Norfolk Railway, when a temporary halt was provided at Rash's Green (since abolished). The single track line continues through the one operational platform at the station, passing the Yaxham Light Railway, then running through a sequence of cuttings and embankments before reaching a level crossing at Garvestone where a station has previously been proposed. The line then descends to pass through the head of the Yare valley, dividing into double track for the extended passing loop and storage siding at Thuxton.

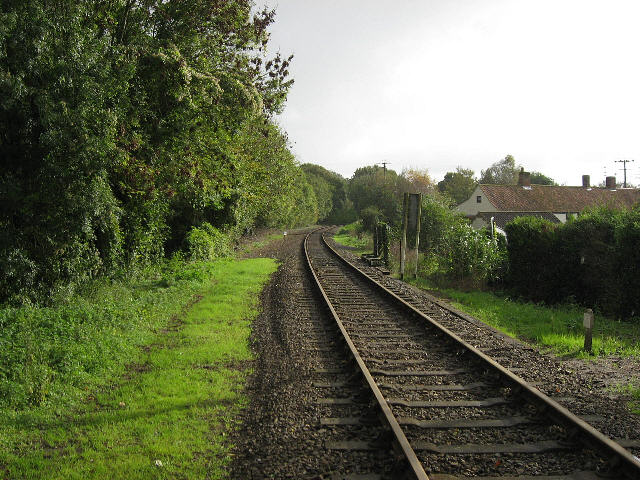
Line near Thuxton in 2006

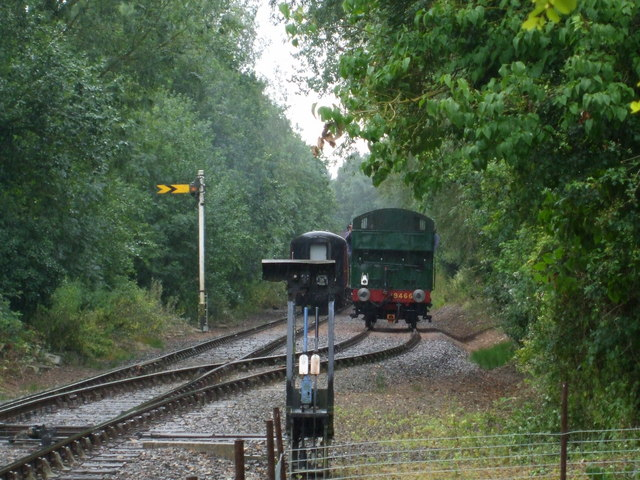
Wymondham Abbey loop

Work to complete a passing loop at Thuxton, provide operational signalling and lengthen the up platform to accommodate longer and more frequent train services was completed in 2010. The signalling is operated from a new signal box located beside the level crossing. The foundations of the waiting room on the up platform were left in place and are being reconstructed to provide passenger facilities at what is now the main passing point on the route. Double track extends for a considerable distance south of the station, having been relayed to serve as a storage siding. The single operating line, on the down formation, continues through fields to Hardingham.

The majority of trains pass through Hardingham without stopping, as there is no public right of way between the road and the station platforms. Double track extends southwards from the station, over Danemoor Bank – with the up formation being reserved for use as a storage siding. Approaching Kimberley, a large storage yard has been created on a former rail-served quarry site and part of the up formation as part of a contract to store mainline rolling stock.

After passing the sidings, and passing over a level crossing, the single track section continues southwards, passing the village of Wicklewood in a deep cutting. The restored windmill at Wicklewood can be seen to the west of the line, before the line drops into the Tiffey valley and then passing over the main Dereham to Wymondham road close to Crownthorpe before entering the Tiffey Valley and the outskirts of Wymondham. Most services terminate at a halt close to the Grade I listed Wymondham Abbey, a former Benedictine priory founded in 1107 and now serving as the Parish Church.

Wymondham Abbey has a reversing loop provided south of the adjacent level crossing, on the site of an original Norfolk Railway station (the foundations of which being discovered during works on the site). Although not open to regular services, the line continues a further 1 mile (1.6 km) before joining with the main line at Wymondham railway station. At this time this final section is not usually operated by passenger services.

The route of the MNR includes the following stations, listed from north to south:

Proposed extension
| Location | Status | Opened | Closed | Notes | Photograph |
|---|---|---|---|---|---|
| Fakenham East | Redeveloped | 1857 | 5 October 1964 | Station demolished after closure in 1980 and the site redeveloped as sheltered housing. The Norfolk Orbital Railway owns a section of the formation south from the station. | Site of Fakenham East station in 2010 |
| Ryburgh | Closed / Private | 1857 | 5 October 1964 | Remaining buildings are in private ownership, with the original station having been destroyed in an air raid. | Ryburgh station in 2009 |

Section Under restoration
| Location | Status | Opened | Closed | Notes | Photograph |
|---|---|---|---|---|---|
| County School | Visitor Centre | 1886 | 5 October 1964 | The station has a car park, picnic area, toilets, and tea room. It serves as the focus for several footpaths in the Wensum Valley and has been used as a film location on several occasions. The station is periodically served by rail replacement bus and coach services offered by the MNR during special events. | County School station from the southern end of the platform June 2010 |
| North Elmham | Closed / Private | 20 March 1849 | 5 October 1964 | Building and platform in private ownership. Plans exist to relay the track and build a new platform to enable the restoration of passenger services. | North Elmham |

Operational section
| Location | Status | Opened | Closed | Notes | Photograph |
|---|---|---|---|---|---|
| Dereham | Open | 15 February 1847 | 6 October 1969 | The headquarters of the railway, restored to 1950s condition with help from European and Government funding. The station has a large car park, and is situated close to the town centre. | Dereham station – main building and canopy |
| Yaxham | Open | 15 February 1847 | 6 October 1969 | The station retains many of its buildings, including the signal box, in private ownership. There are no passenger facilities or shelter on the operational platform. Yaxham is also the home of the Yaxham Light Railway, who operate from behind the abolished up platform, and a steam locomotive boiler engineering company based in the former goods yard. | Yaxham station |
| Thuxton | Open | 15 February 1847 | 6 October 1969 | The down platform waiting room has been restored as holiday accommodation, with the station house being a private home. | Thuxton station |
| Hardingham | Closed / Private | 15 February 1847 | 6 October 1969 | Hardingham station is restored but, apart from the platforms, is private and few scheduled trains stop there. There are no public rights of way from nearby roads to any part of the station. In 2001 the station was awarded the Ian Allan Heritage Award. In recent years public trains have stopped specially at Hardingham on the day of the Hardingham Fete. The station yard, also in private ownership, is equipped with two maintenance sheds. A variety of mainline and industrial rolling stock is maintained on site. | Hardingham station |
| Kimberley Park | Open | 15 February 1847 | 6 October 1969 | The station building is a private home, with the up platform partially removed. The down platform has been restored for passenger use, and is provided with a small GER-style passenger shelter. New owners in 2020 are gradually restoring the station to its original condition. | Kimberley Park station |
| Wymondham Abbey | Open | 2 May 1999 | - | The station is a basic platform built using scaffolding and boards close to Wymondham Abbey. MNR trains do not serve the main Wymondham railway station, which is served by trains on the Breckland Line of the National Rail network. Wymondham and Wymondham Abbey stations are separated by a one-mile (1.6 km) walk through the town centre. | Wymondham Abbey station |

There have been plans to create additional stations at Hoe, Garvestone and Wymondham Junction railway station on the boundary between MNR and NR, allowing a short walk from branch to main line.

== Engineering projects ==
Large projects have been completed with help from European and Government funding, including restoration of Dereham station building, construction of a locomotive pit and provisions for steam working. Almost all the work, including maintaining the track and locomotives, running the trains and working the crossings, is by unpaid volunteers – although a condition of recent funding is the creation of a number of paid posts.

Other future projects include the installation of signalling at Dereham and Wymondham. The new Thuxton signal box was commissioned in summer 2015.

=== Dereham station restoration ===
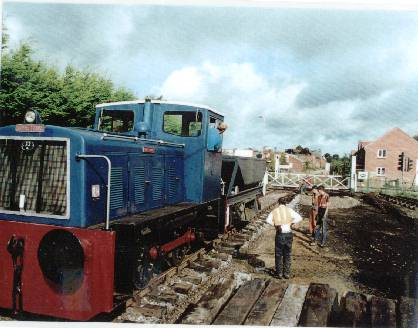
Re-laying track at Dereham

Dereham station had, since closure, been totally stripped out and gutted by a major fire in 1988. In 2002 the line was awarded over £600,000 in grants from the European Union and the East of England Development Agency. This allowed the railway to restore the station and several associated buildings, including the two railway-owned crossing cottages and a World War II pillbox.

In June 2013 a planning application was approved by Breckland District Council for the construction of a footbridge at Dereham Station to link platforms 1 and 2. This was to involve the restoration and assembly of the original footbridge from Whittlesford station. In 2018 this footbridge was sold by the railway.

=== Dereham traction and rolling stock shed ===
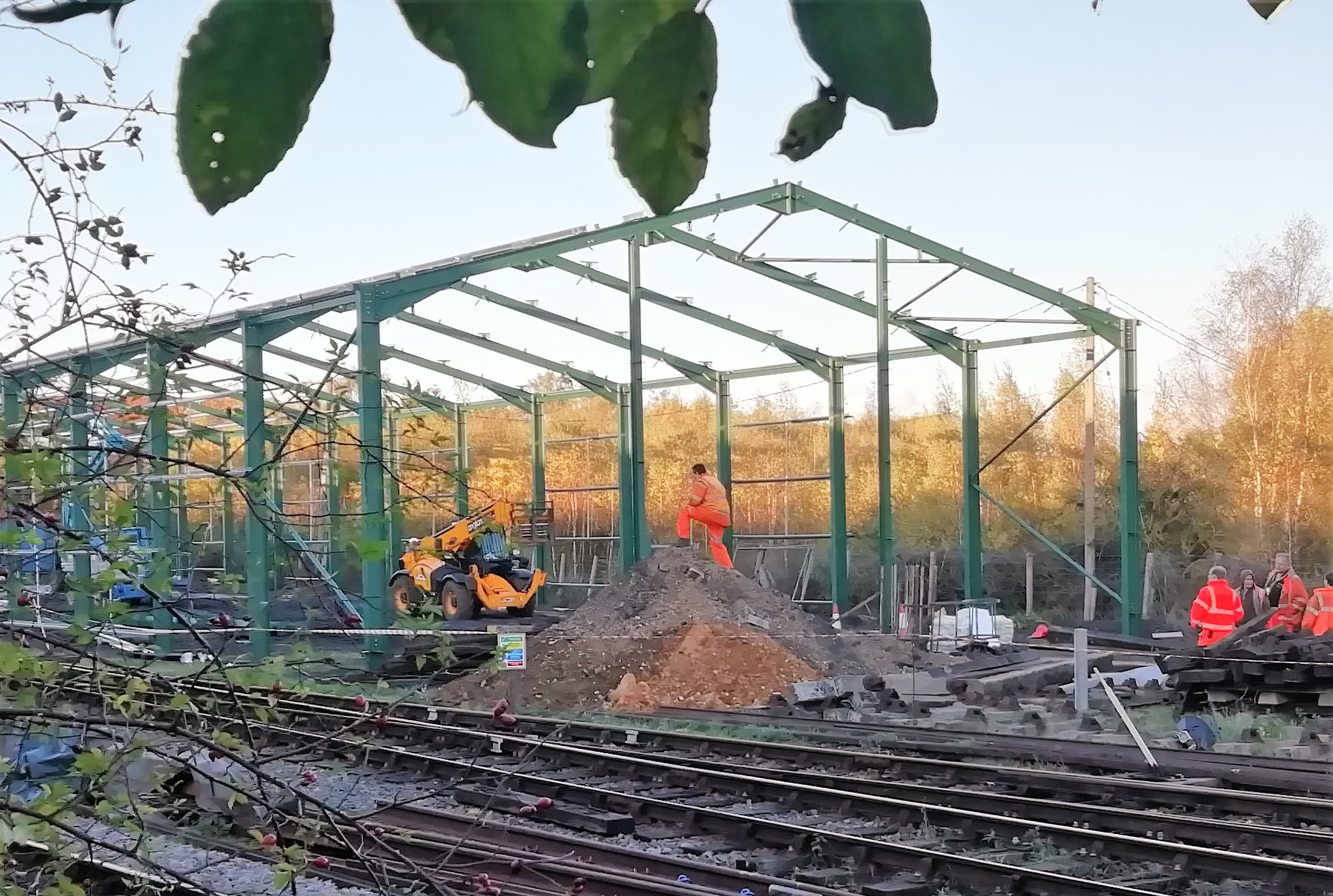
Dereham loco shed under construction, 2018

In order to allow for restoration and maintenance of locomotives and rolling stock, the line decided to build a new shed in Dereham yard. In 2014 a suitable 18m x 55m building frame was located near Goole using eBay, purchased and brought to Dereham. The site in Dereham Yard was cleared and levelled in early 2015 with the spoil moved north of Hoe to widen an embankment using wagons hired for five days from Network Rail.

In 2018 a new traction and rolling stock maintenance shed was built, following the award of a £100,000 grant from the European Union. The grant from the EU Leader Fund's Wensum and Coast Local Area Group amounted to 80% of the project's total construction cost and is dependent on future job creation.

=== Dereham turntable ===
In March 2015 the Mid-Norfolk Railway secured the former Hitchin Turntable for installation at Dereham.

=== Thuxton loop and signalling works ===
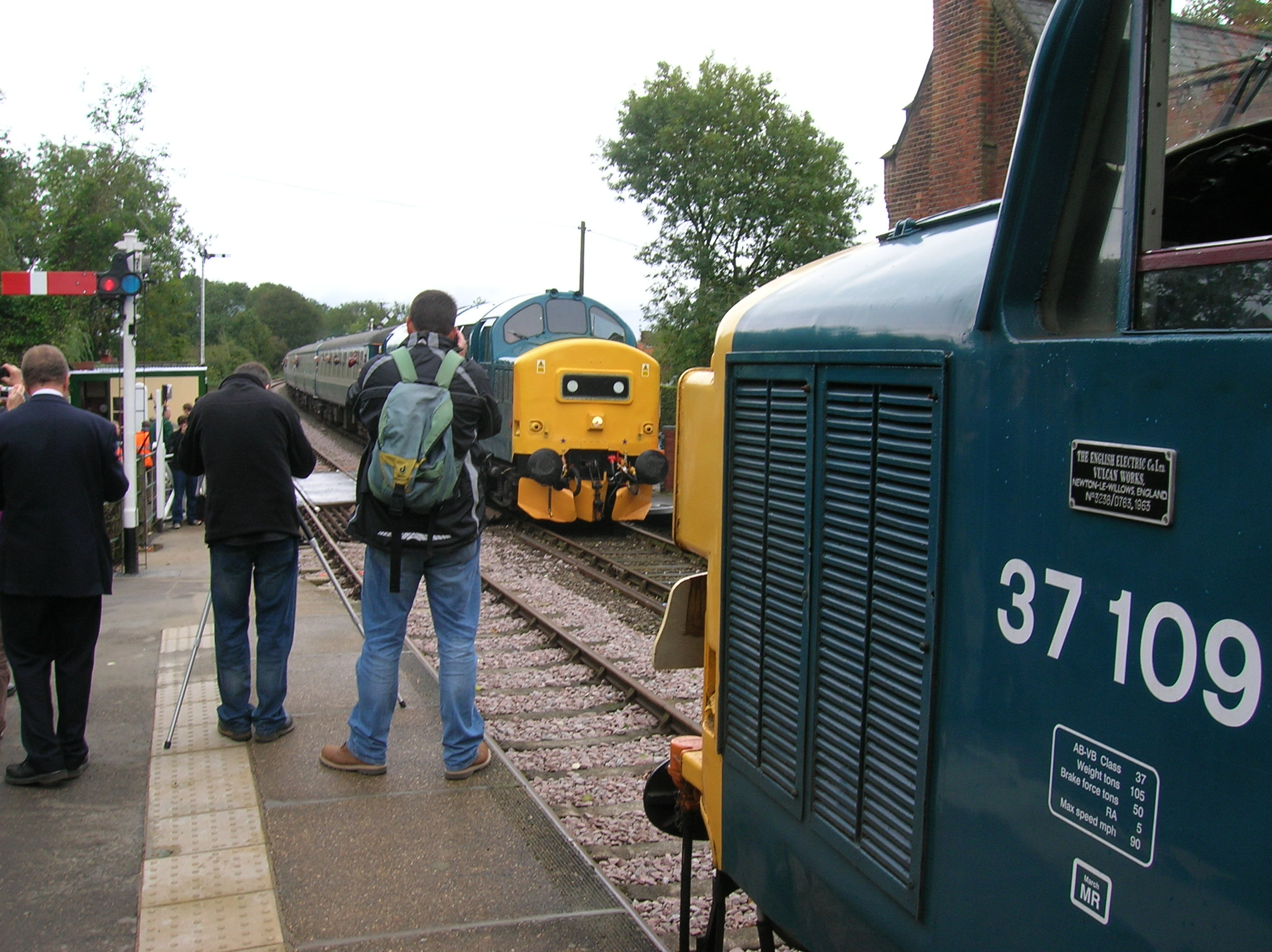
Class 37s passing at Thuxton, Autumn Gala 2010

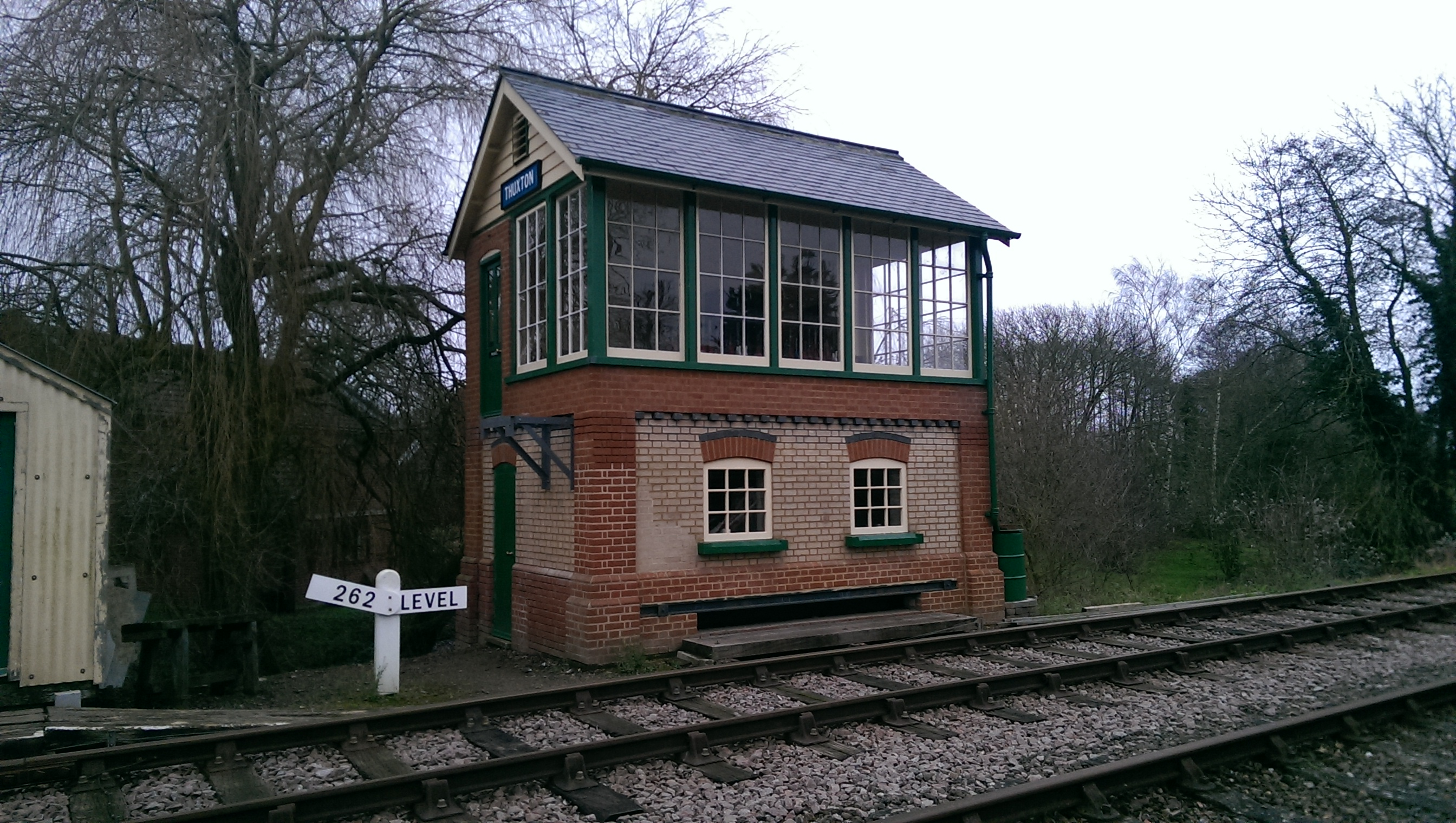
The partially completed signal box at Thuxton, 2012

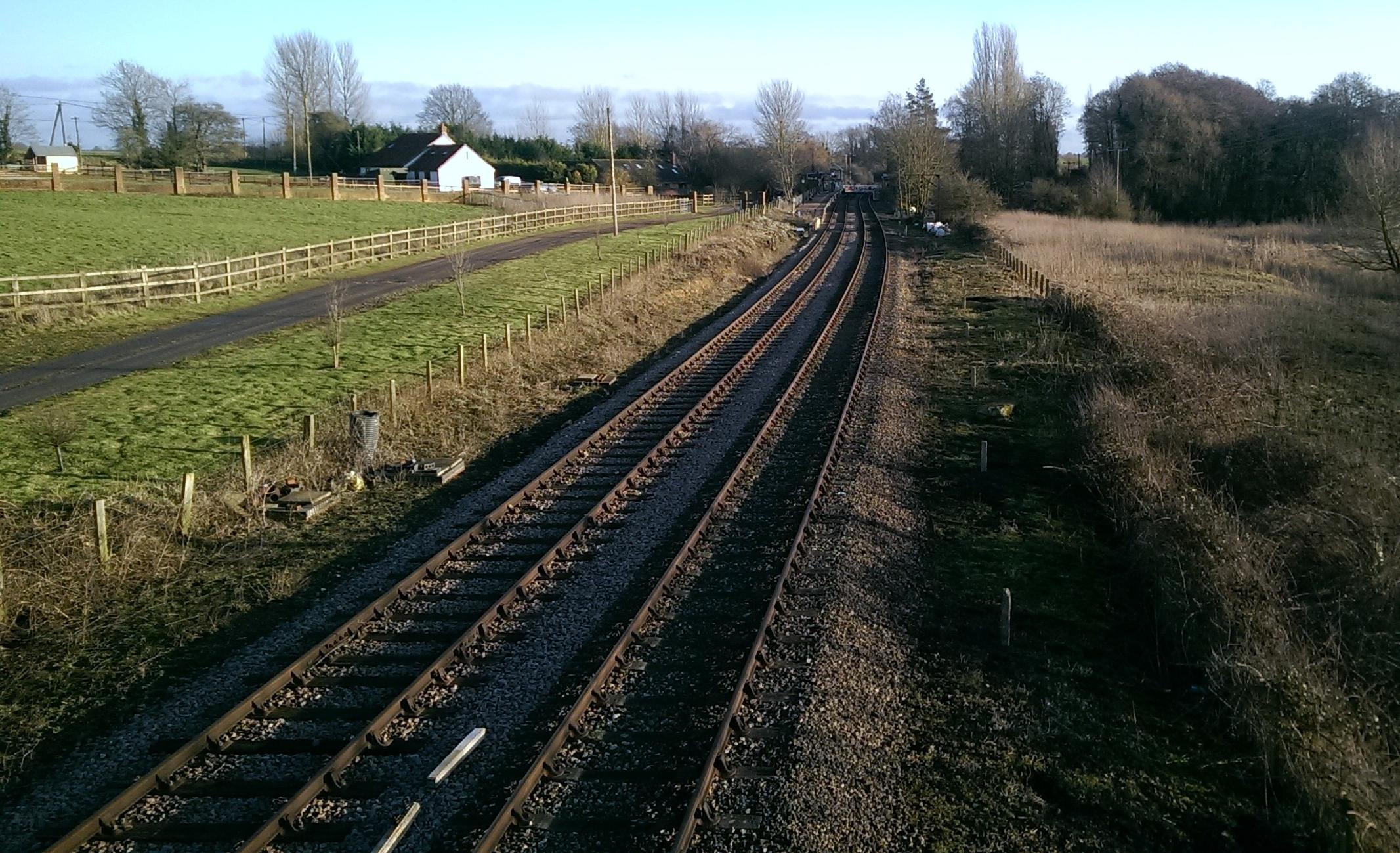
The completed loop, 2015

The Mid-Norfolk Railway's 2001 Bearer bond issue proposals included £60,000 for the provision of a passing loop at Hardingham. With this station being in private hands this proposal was abandoned in favour of a loop at Thuxton.

During 2008, the company began construction of the passing loop at Thuxton station to allow hourly departures from Dereham and Wymondham. Preparatory works were carried out late in 2008 and the first phase of work; installing the southern turn out commenced during January 2009, this was completed on schedule during February of the same year. Panels of track for the loop were laid, levelled and ballasted and the both turn outs installed by the end of 2009. The final major task on the track work will see the level crossing widened to accommodate the double track.

The loop was declared operational in September 2010, although with limited signalling working from a covered ground frame and part of the restored up platform remaining out of use. The first scheduled passenger trains to pass at Thuxton did so during the 2010 Autumn Diesel Gala, in which the railway operated at its most intensive service levels ever.

Full signalling will be included as part of the final project including five semaphore and two colour light signals along with two point motors to operate the turnouts. These will be controlled from a new signal box on site sourced from East Winch on the former King's Lynn line. This project has also made the commissioning of the dormant Dereham Central signal box a priority for the company. As of 29 January 2009, over £25,000 has been raised towards the new works taking the appeal over half way. Since becoming operational in September 2010, work has continued on the signalling, the signal box became operational during summer 2015 allowing the temporary ground frame and shed to be removed. A Trap point will be fitted to the exit of the siding south of Thuxton station, as well as additional signals including signals allowing bi-directional movements in the down platform and a ground frame at Garvestone crossing with associated gate locks and distant signals interlocked with Thuxton signal box. The completed scheme will allow the train from Wymondham to arrive before the train from Dereham when two trains are operating, this is not currently possible. Locomotives will also be able to run round their trains in the station.

=== County School station restoration ===
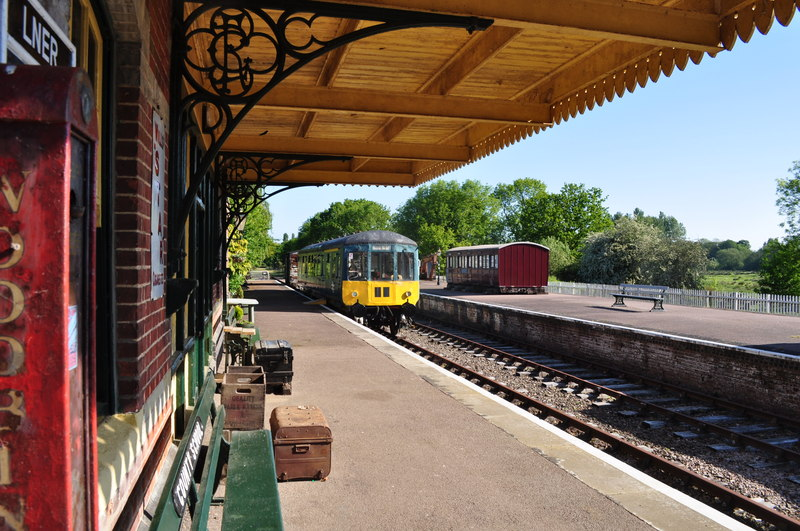
County School in LNER guise, 2010

In 1998 the MNRPT signed a Tenancy at Will with Breckland District Council to take over the station and trackbed at County School. The track north of the platforms had been lifted with the remainder overgrown. The station was boarded up, with smashed glass, a stripped interior and broken windows.

The MNR returned the station to use, as a visitor centre rather than an operational railway museum. Over the next year, the MNR spent £28,000 restoring the station buildings to wartime LNER condition, tidying the grounds and removing scrap material left by the former lessee. With additional investment, the station drive, damaged after decades of neglect, was professionally resurfaced, scrub growth was removed from the railway formation opening up the views of the Wensum Valley for walkers, and formation for the restoration of track was prepared. The station and site was then sold for a nominal sum to the Mid-Norfolk Railway for railway use, and with the MNR agreeing to retain and maintain a permissive footpath previously established by Breckland Council over the purchased section of line.

=== County School signal box ===
The original signal boxes at County School were both demolished after passenger closure, but the locking room footings of the main box survived and were restored to allow for the delivery of the original signal cabin from Halesworth to be relocated to the site from Halesworth Middle School, where it had been displayed since 1986. On arrival it was found to be in much worse condition than anticipated, and in 2017, after further deterioration whilst at County School and with no immediate funds available for its restoration, the Mid-Norfolk Railway decided to allow the removal of the signalbox from the brick built locking room and transferred ownership of it to the Mangapps Railway Museum in Essex.

=== Hardingham – Kimberley Park storage capacity ===
Following months of negotiations in early 2018 with local train operating company Greater Anglia, a £3.25M agreement was reached to provide siding capacity for approximately 30 Class 755 multiple units.

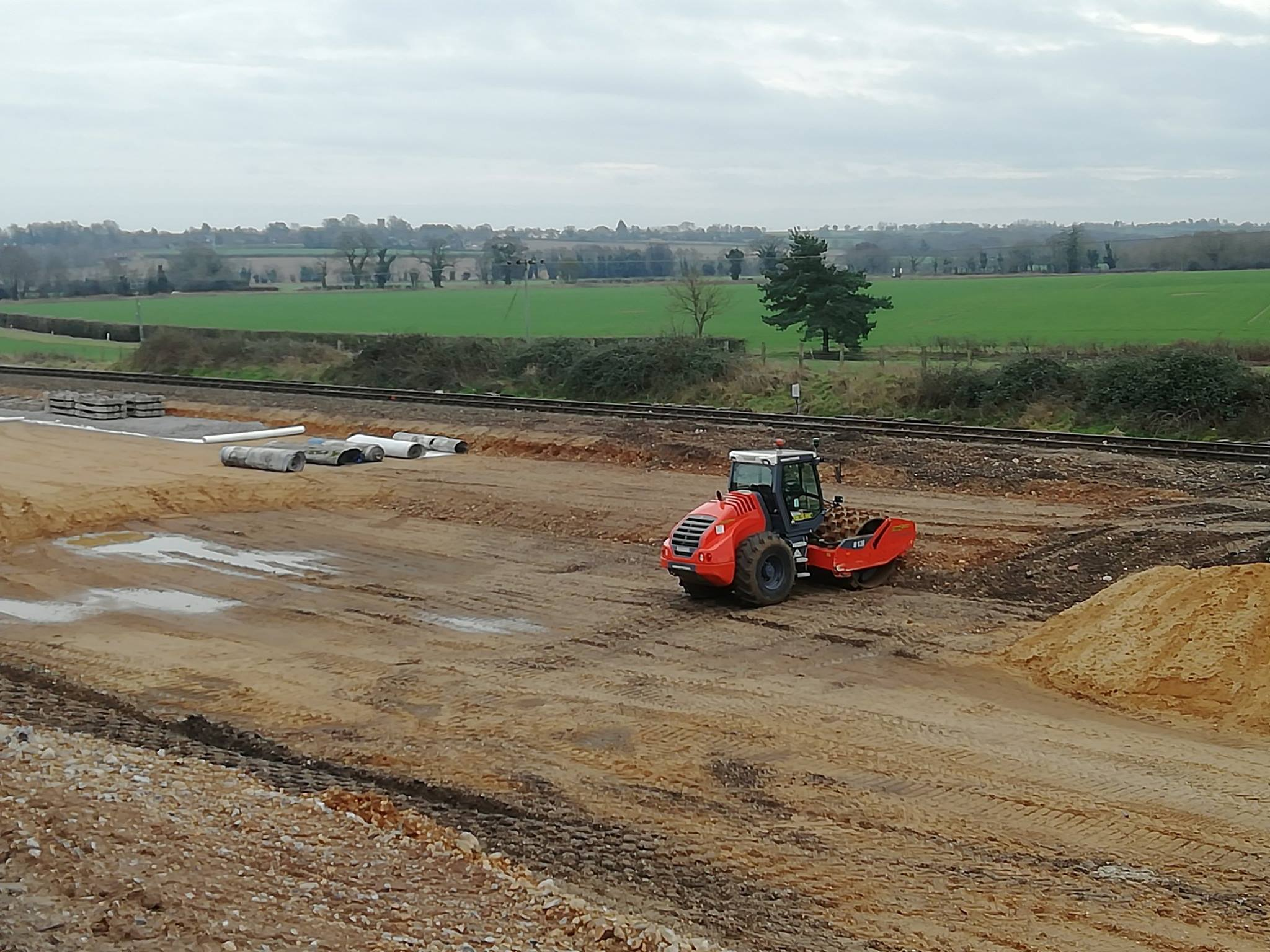
Site near Kimberley being levelled for use as rail yard, 2019

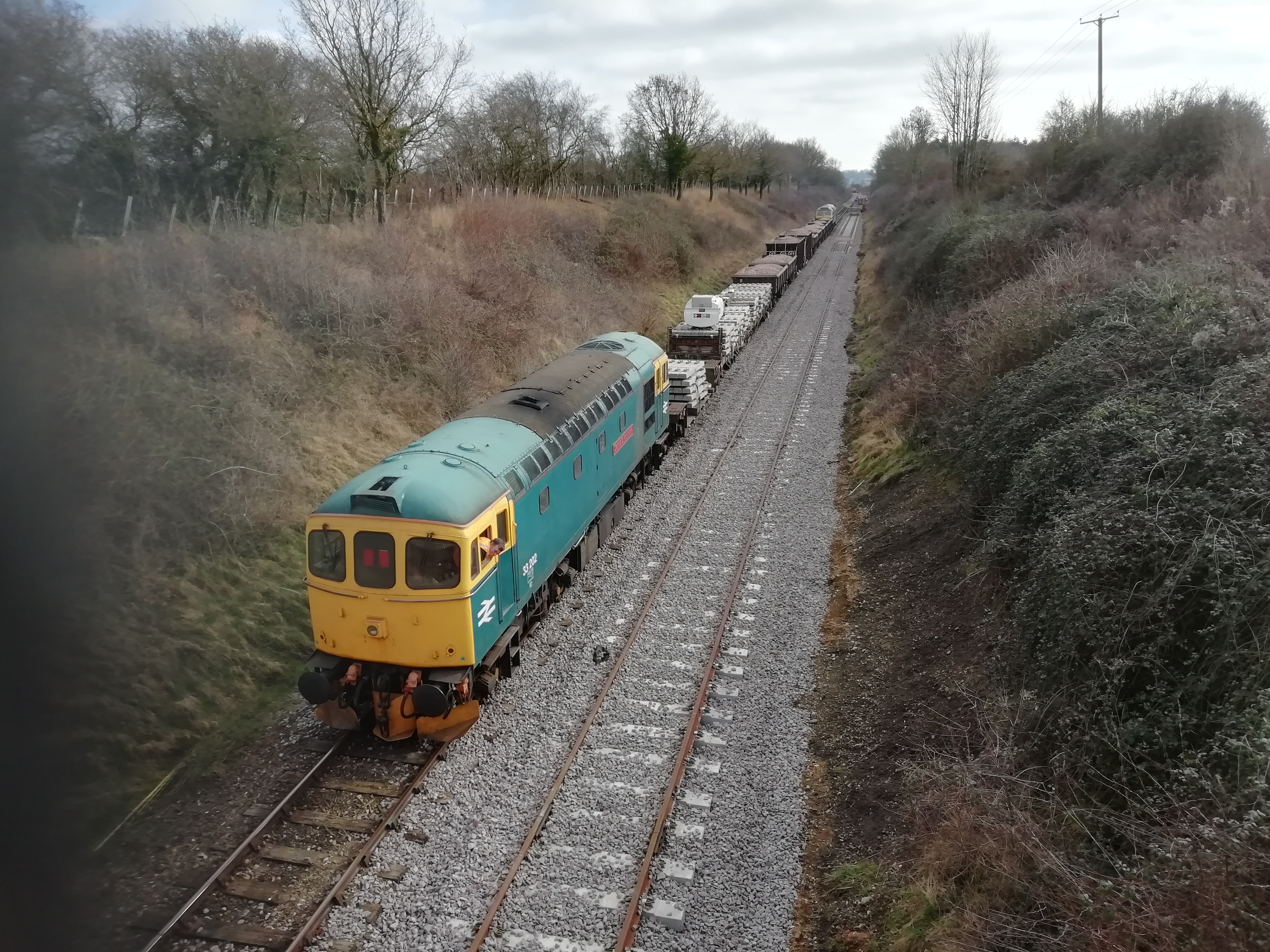
Relaying the down line over Danemoor Bank, 2019

Greater Anglia require a significant increase in siding capacity while they introduce their new fleet of trains as both the old and new fleets will be in East Anglia at the same time. The agreement was announced to the members of the MNRPT at the Trust's AGM on 30 June 2018 with work commencing on site three weeks later. Construction of the sidings is being paid for from upfront storage charges paid by Greater Anglia. As the principal contractor is Sonic Rail Services of Burnham-on-Crouch, the project has been nicknamed "Project Hedgehog" by some of the MNR's volunteers in honour of Sonic the Hedgehog. The Class 755 units will be stored in the sidings during testing, commissioning and driver training prior to being used for passenger services.

The scheme included improving the signalling along the line to improve operational flexibility allowing access to the sidings for train movements and for machinery during the construction phase. This include a "No-Signalman Key Token" (NSKT) Electric Key Token system between Wymondham Abbey and Thuxton with intermediate instruments mid-section at the Ballast Pit Sidings and Hardingham. Laying a fan of 5 sidings north of Kimberley Park on the site of an old Ballast Pit to the east of the line at the 4 mile post including a crossover and headshunt. The Up formation south of the accommodation crossing has been dug out of the embankment and levelled to allow the siding closest to the running line to be level. Laying a new running line over Danemoor Bank and through the Up platform at Hardingham station. The Up line on Danemoor Bank becoming a long loop siding ending north of the accommodation crossing south of Danemoor Bank at Brick Kiln Grove. The new Down line becoming the new running line. The project also included the installation of a connection into Hardingham yard for the various owners of the separate parts of the old yard in exchange for the land required to fit the double track past the yard.

=== Dereham – Yaxham Road level crossing replacement ===
In May 2020, the MNR replaced the life-expired components on the Yaxham Road level crossing in Dereham. The work saw the replacement of electronic equipment, the track beneath the road, replacement of the road surface and the upgrade of the crossing's lights. A public appeal for funds for the work raised a total of £150,000.

This work included installing a modular crossing deck system developed by Edilon Sedra. Officials from both Network Rail and Transport for London visited the MNR during the installation with this type of crossing planned to be introduced on the wider UK rail network. A second Edilon Sedra crossing deck was installed at Kimberley Park station in May 2021.

=== Route extension ===
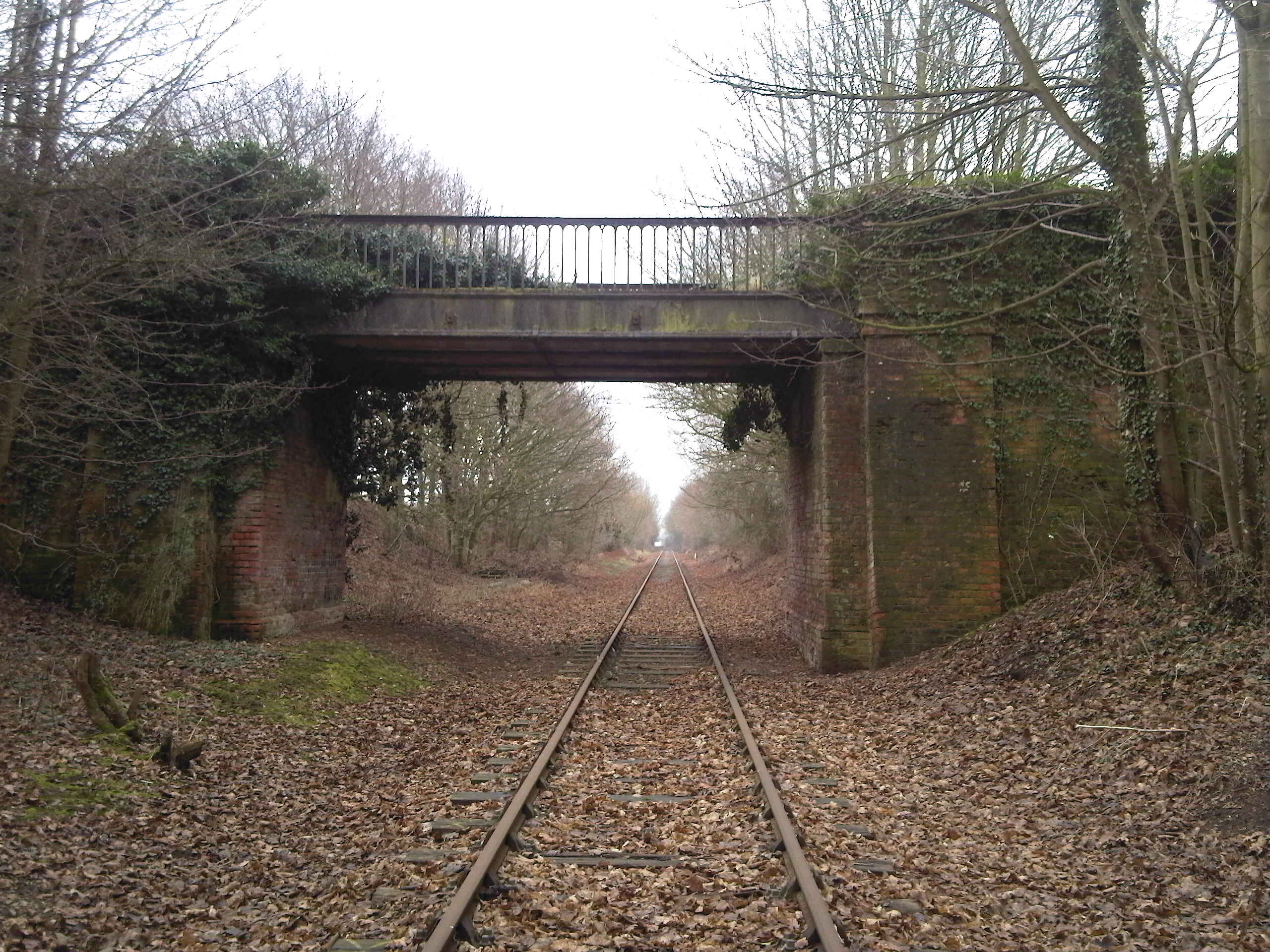
Bridge 1701 on the under-restoration section, near Hoe, prior to reopening in 2013.

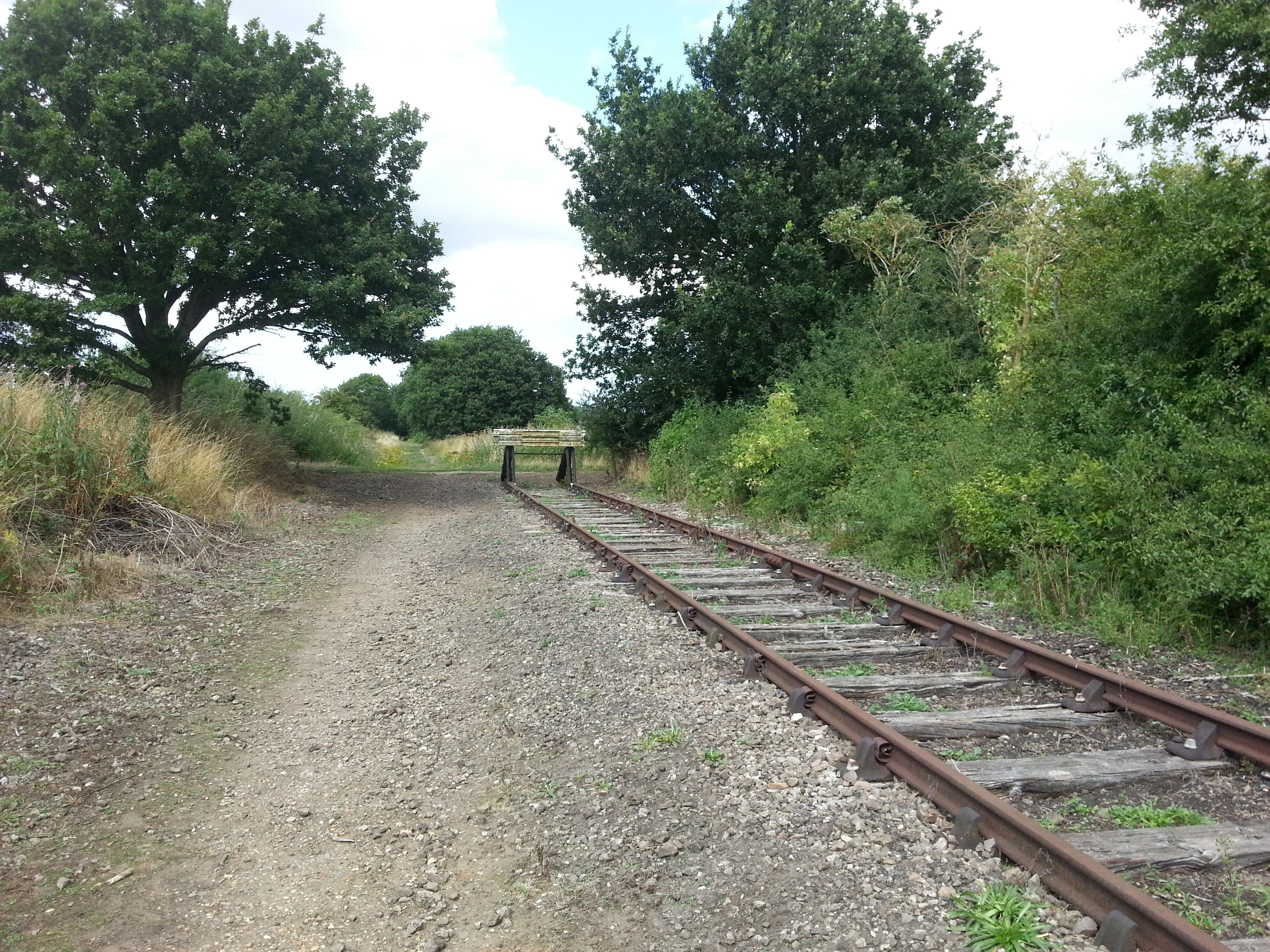
North Elmham buffer stops, the operational limit of the Mid-Norfolk Railway under the 2001 Transport and Work Act Order.

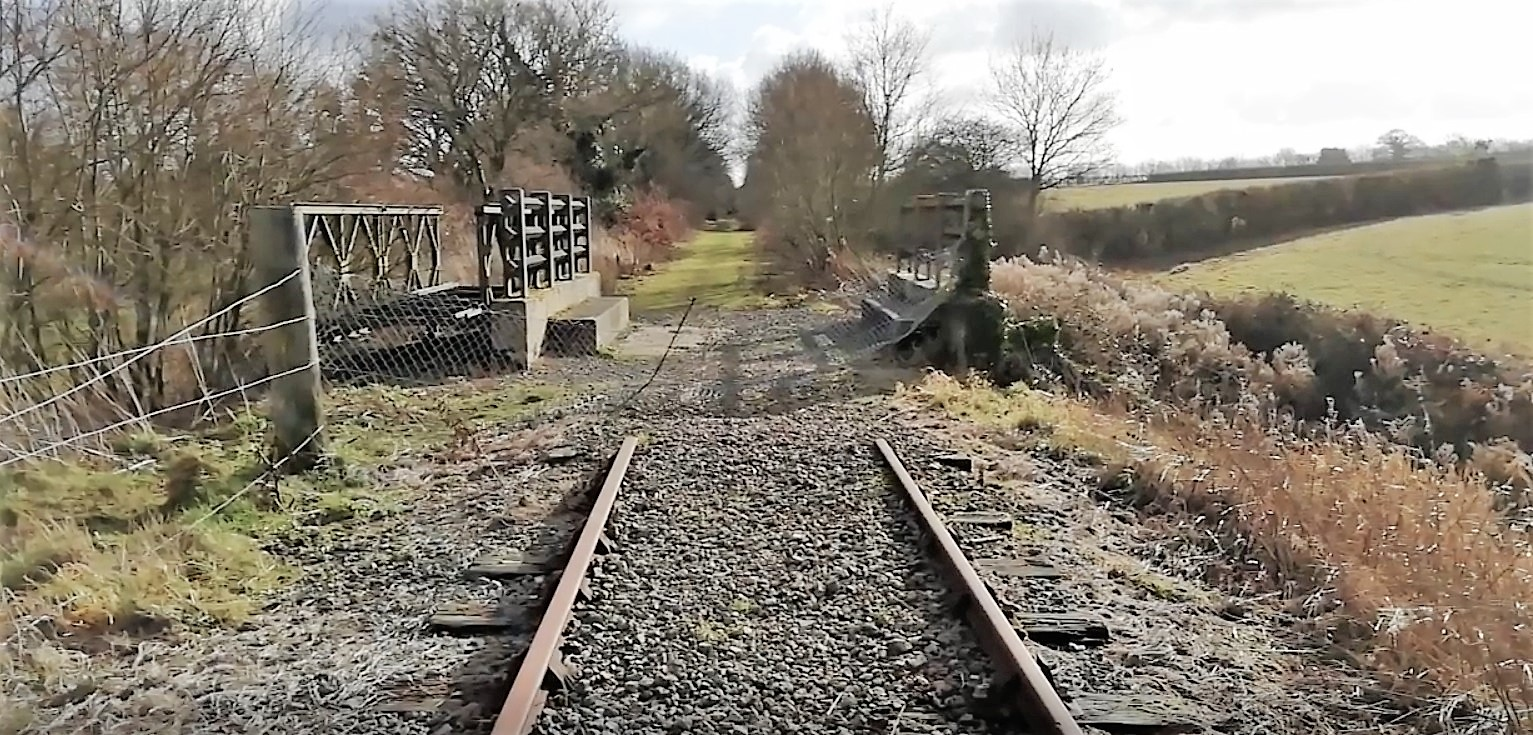
Bridge 1707 at County School, owned by the MNR, looking back towards North Elmham from the present limit of the restored track. A permissive footpath is maintained to the east of the tracks, which the railway intend to retain when the remaining line is restored.

This project entails reopening the line north of Dereham to County School in stages, initially to Hoe (a hamlet near Gressenhall). The option to build a platform at Hoe using components from the former St Ives branch was considered but it has been decided to focus efforts on restoring the track to North Elmham where better access is available for visitors, although it will still be possible to add a platform at Hoe in the future if it is considered to be of benefit to the railway. The level crossing at Hoe has been rebuilt to accommodate widening of the road. Gradual sleeper replacement, drainage repair and vegetation clearance is ongoing towards North Elmham.

A railway inspector authorised by the Office of Rail Regulation inspected the section between Dereham and Hoe prior to the first passenger train using the track, the inspector set out rules governing the frequency of use and the necessary inspection regime that should be used on this section as well as the maximum speed permitted. The inspector limited the use of the line north of Dereham to 12 days per year for passenger trains due to the lack of operational signalling equipment in the Dereham station area and the absence of a Facing Point Lock on the points immediately north of Norwich Road level crossing, this legally means they must be clipped and locked manually prior to use by passenger trains. The speed limit north of Dereham is 15 mph due to the condition of the track, the speed limit could be increased by adding additional ballast.

The first full passenger train to operate over the section of line between Dereham and Hoe did so on 18 May 2013, being a main line InterCity 125 charter from London St Pancras station. On 19 May 2018 the line between Hoe and Worthing officially opened to passenger trains bringing the operational length of the railway to over 15 miles. The section north of Dereham will continue to be used on special event days only until full opening to a station at North Elmham is achieved.

On 4 March 2018, 5 "Dogfish" ballast hoppers were moved from the siding in Wymondham and used to drop ballast between Hoe and Worthing before being stabled just south of North Elmham level crossing. This was the first train to reach North Elmham from Wymondham since British Rail closed the line.

Planning permission for the relaying and operation of the line between County School and North Elmham was granted by Breckland District Council on 9 November 1992, with initial tracklaying starting soon after. This grants permission, associated with the original enabling act, to operate a railway north beyond the buffers north of North Elmham station (at 52°44′53″N 0°57′09″E), where The Mid-Norfolk Railway Order 2001 ends.

The Mid-Norfolk Railway has long-term aims to restore the railway as far as Fakenham, and has held talks with North Norfolk District Council and Fakenham Town Council about restoring the route to a proposed new station close to the town centre. This would result in a 23-mile (37 km)-long route through the centre of Norfolk. The former railway route has been protected from development that would be prejudicial to the creation of railway transport links by North Norfolk District Council and Norfolk County Council.

==== Norfolk Orbital Railway ====
The Norfolk Orbital Line is a long term proposed railway of which the Mid-Norfolk Railway would form a significant part. It is an ambitious plan to form a line between Sheringham and Wymondham for regular passenger services, joining up with the Network Rail system at either end. These ambitions were aided on 2 January 2008 when Network Rail announced it was giving consideration to allowing construction of a limited use level crossing between the North Norfolk Railway and the Bittern branch line.

In 2009, the Norfolk Orbital Railway attempted to secure a section of the railway formation in Fakenham, but was outbid by a London developer who claimed not to know of the project. The land was once again auctioned on 10 December 2014, and was secured for the railway project for £24,000. In 2016 the project was awarded £60,000 from the Heritage Lottery Fund to help repair the Fakenham bridges, provide an education resource, equipment for the Fakenham Area Conservation Team and to create a walk along the preserved formation for people to enjoy.

== Rolling stock ==
The Mid-Norfolk Railway plays host to a large collection of locomotives, passenger carriages and wagons, most of which are from the 1950s to 1990s period. A variety of steam locomotives operate on the MNR throughout a season however, BR Standard Class 4 2-6-4T 80078 has been on long term hire to the railway since 2018. Diesel locomotives also operate on the MNR, these include Class 03, Class 04, Class 31, Class 33, Class 37, Class 47 & Class 50, along with Class 100, Class 101, Class 108, Class 117, Class 142 and Class 144 multiple units. Further information can be found on the separate Wiki page Rolling stock of the Mid-Norfolk Railway.

== Funding and associated bodies ==
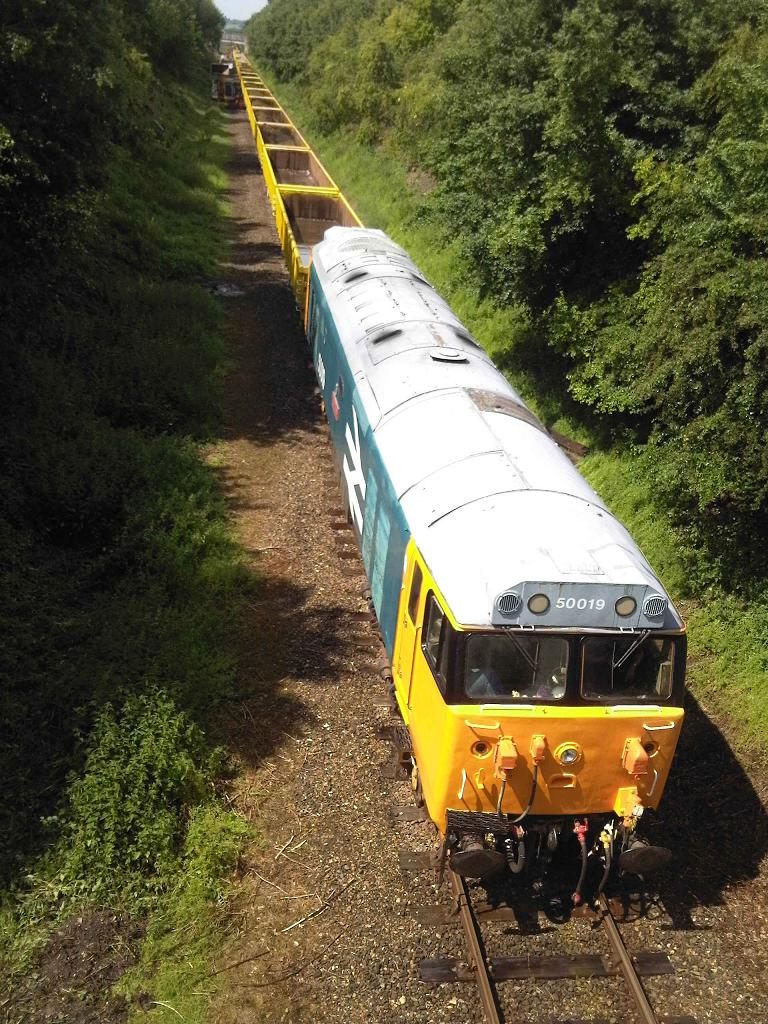
The Class 50 Locomotive Association's 50019 on a ballast working at Danemoor, June 2009.

The Mid-Norfolk Railway is owned and operated by Mid-Norfolk Railway Preservation Trust, a registered charity, with finance for the development of the line coming through the commercial operation of the railway and specific funding appeals. The opening of the line was partly funded by a loan from Breckland District Council of £50,000, repayable over 20 years commencing April 2003 and a loan of £25,000, repayable over 18 years commencing June 2001, from South Norfolk District Council. A grant of £50,000 was made by Norfolk County Council, £25,000 from Breckland D.C. and £12,500 from South Norfolk D.C.

In 2001 the railway launched a Bearer bond issue of up to £300,010, offering annual interest at 4% per annum as well as capital repayment after ten years. The nominal value of the Bonds was payable on 31 October 2011. The capital projects proposed for this scheme were:

"1. Part restoration of the Victorian station buildings, goods shed and stables at Dereham, along with the provision of sidings and maintenance facilities. Dereham was also to be provided with watering, coaling and disposal facilities for steam services. (£150,000)
"2. A runround facility was to be provided at Wymondham Abbey. (£20,000)
"3. A passing loop was to be provided at Hardingham. (£60,000)
"4. Essential preparatory work on track restoration on the Northern Section, towards North Elmham. (£25,000)
"5. Additional passenger rolling stock was to be purchased. (£25,000)"

In 2018, the railway was awarded £100,000 from the European Union Leader Fund's Wensum and Coast Local Area Group for a new traction and rolling stock maintenance shed. The same year saw Greater Anglia, complete a £3.25M agreement with the MNR to provide siding capacity at Kimberley.

In 2020, the line was awarded £190,500 from the Culture Recovery Fund, funded by the government and administered by Historic England and the National Lottery Heritage Fund.

The MNR also has several supporting bodies based on the line. The majority are locomotive or rolling stock groups. Private owners have based their stock or locomotives at the line.

The Class 37 Locomotive Group was formed in 1984. The group maintains and operates 37003, which arrived at Dereham in February 2009.

The Stratford 47 Group formed in 2001 to save a Class 47 diesel formerly at Stratford depot in East London. It now owns one locomotive which is 47367 Kenny Cockbird which is operational on the Mid-Norfolk Railway.

The Class 50 Locomotive Association bought 50019 Ramillies in September 1991. Originally on the Spa Valley Railway, it moved to the Mid-Norfolk Railway in May 1999.

The North Norfolk Model Engineering Club are setting up a miniature railway at the MNR's County School terminus.

== See also ==
Other railway preservation societies in Norfolk:

- Barton House Railway
- Bressingham Steam and Gardens
- Bure Valley Railway – built on part of the former County School to Wroxham branch.
- North Norfolk Railway – may be connected to the MNR through the Norfolk Orbital Railway
- Wells Harbour Railway
- Wells and Walsingham Light Railway – built on the northern section of the Wymondham to Wells line.
- Whitwell & Reepham railway station
- Yaxham Light Railway – situated at Yaxham station, beside the MNR.
