= Breckland line =

Railway line in England

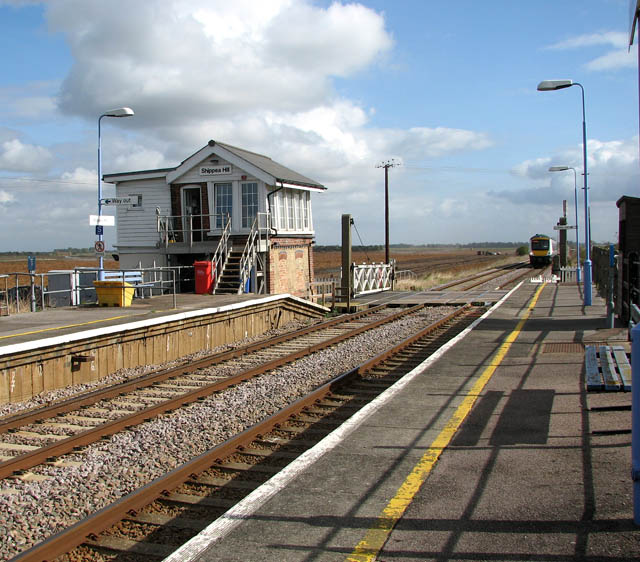
- Shippea Hill in the typically flat Fens

Overview
- Status: Operational
- Owner: Network Rail
- Locale: East of England
- Termini: Norwich; Cambridge
- Stations: 12

Service
- Type: Heavy rail
- System: National Rail
- Operator(s): Greater Anglia; CrossCountry; East Midlands Railway; Great Northern
- Rolling stock: Class 158; Class 170; Class 387; Class 720; Class 755

History
- Opened: 1845

Technical
- Track length: 51 miles 8 chains (82.2 km)
- Number of tracks: 2
- Character: Secondary
- Track gauge: 4 ft 8 1/2 in (1,435 mm) standard gauge
- Loading gauge: W10
- Electrification: 25 kV AC (between Cambridge and Ely and around Norwich)
- Operating speed: 75–90 mph
Route map
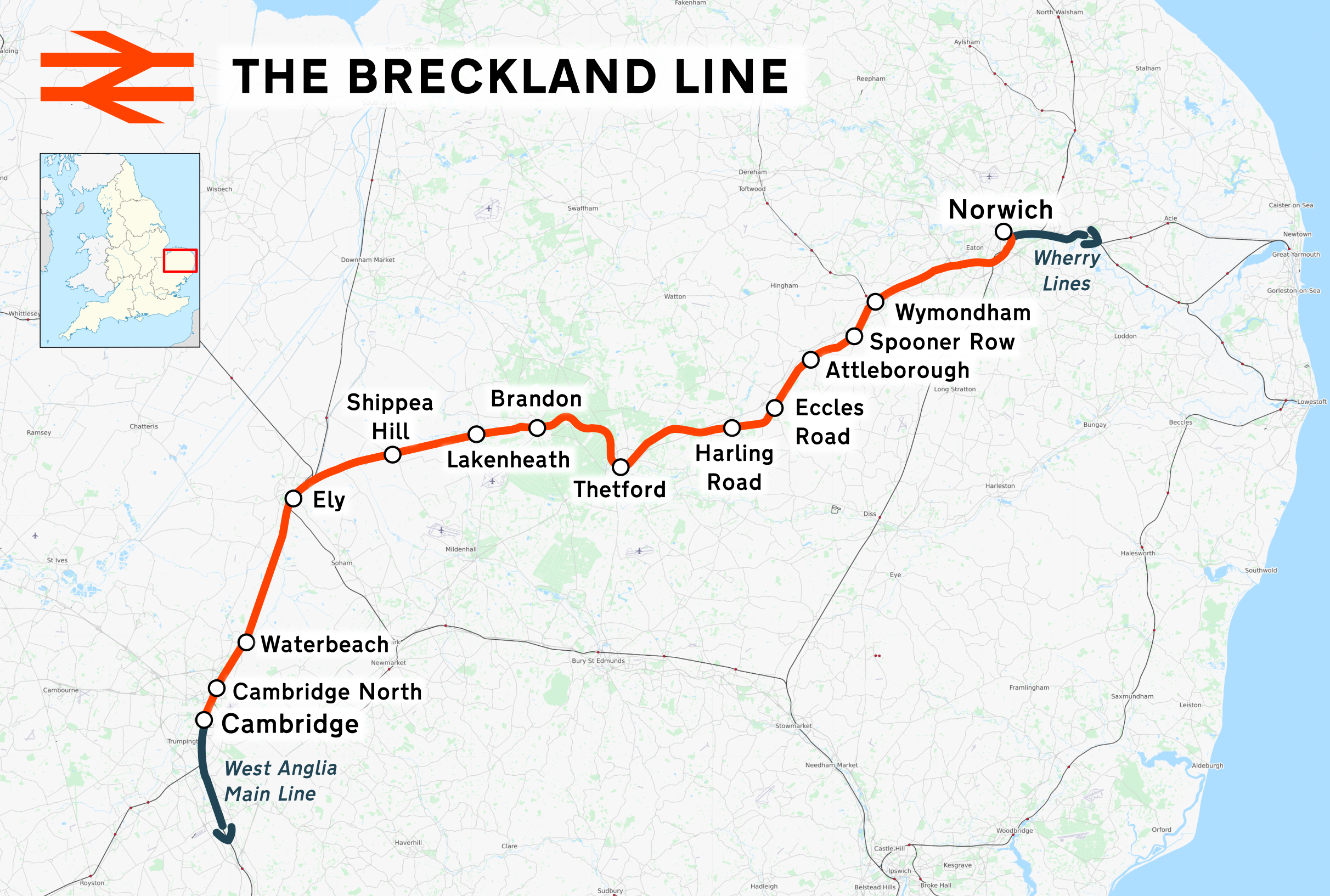
(Click to expand)

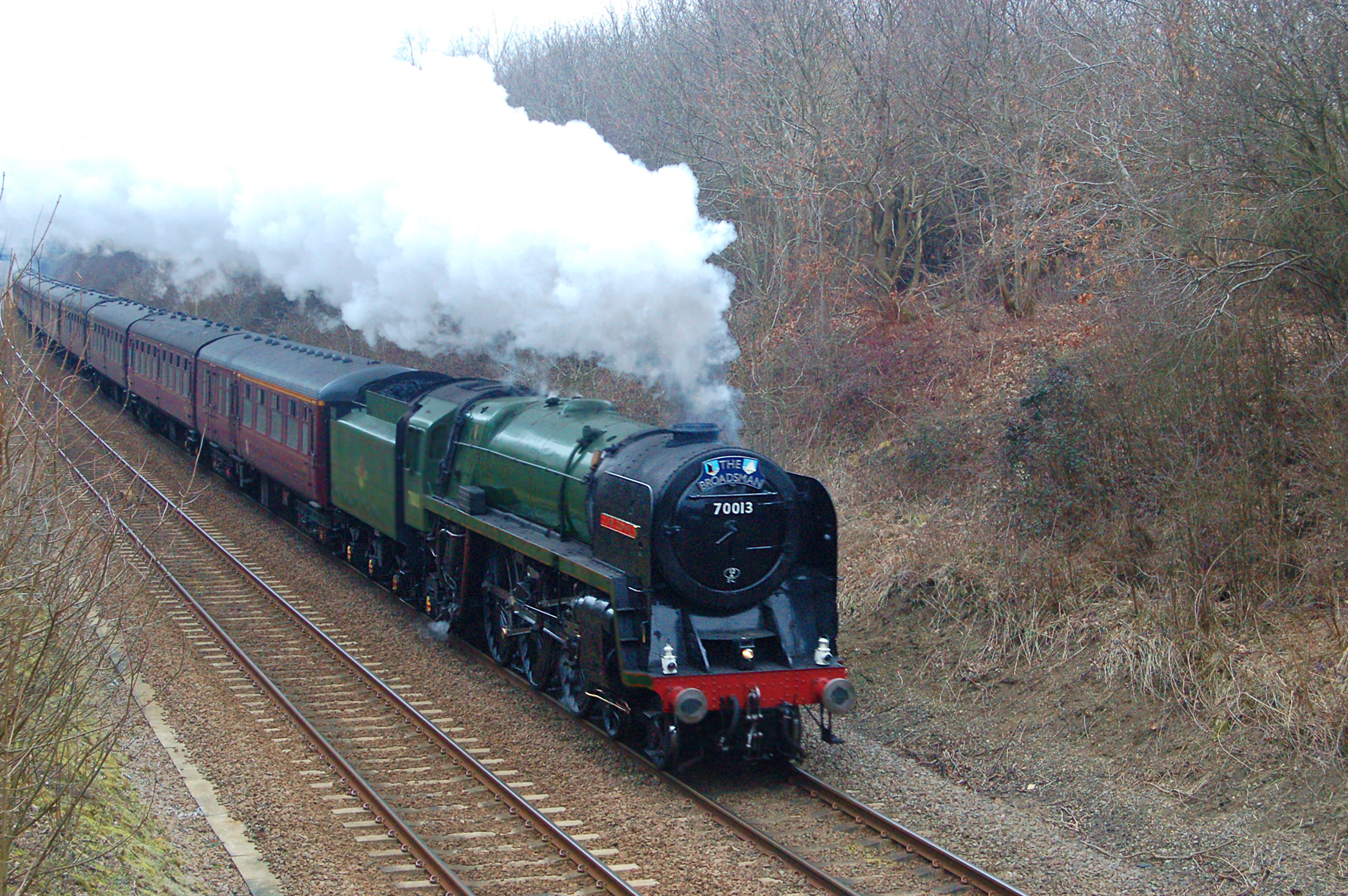
Preserved British Railways Standard 7MT 70013 Oliver Cromwell near Hethersett in 2010, hauling a special train bound for the North Norfolk Railway.

The Breckland line is a secondary railway line in the east of England that links Cambridge in the west to Norwich in the east. The line runs through three counties: Cambridgeshire, Suffolk and Norfolk. It takes its name from the Breckland region of Norfolk and passes through Thetford Forest.

The line is 51 miles 8 chains (82.2 km) in length, from where it branches off the Fen line north of Ely to where it joins the Great Eastern Main Line south of Norwich. There are 12 stations on the line, including the termini.

The line is part of the Network Rail Strategic Route 5, SRS 05.09 and part of SRS 05.05. It is classified as a secondary line, except between Cambridge and Ely which is a London and South East commuter line. Passenger services on the Breckland line are operated by Greater Anglia (which manages all of the stations), CrossCountry, East Midlands Railway and Great Northern.

== History ==
Following the successful opening of the Yarmouth and Norwich Railway, the Norwich and Brandon Railway was incorporated in 1844 to build a line between those two places. The Eastern Counties Railway was at the same time building a route from Newport in Essex through Cambridge via Ely to Brandon. This route would be the first route between Norwich and London.

A month before opening, the Yarmouth and Norwich Railway and the Norwich and Brandon Railway merged to become the Norfolk Railway.

The two lines opened on the same day, 30 July 1845, although the line only opened to a temporary station at Wensum, pending the completion of the Trowse swing bridge which was achieved in December 1845. Through services from Shoreditch (later known as Bishopsgate) to Norwich Thorpe station started on 15 December 1845.

Although it was expected that locomotive changes would take place between the two companies at Brandon, where an engine house had been built, the Norfolk Railway in fact operated trains to Ely. The ECR and its rival, the Eastern Union Railway (EUR), were both sizing up the NR to acquire and expand their railway empires. The ECR trumped the EUR by taking over the NR and became responsible for operating the services from 8 May 1848.

By the 1860s, the railways in East Anglia were in financial trouble and most were leased to the Eastern Counties Railway, which wished to amalgamate formally but could not obtain government agreement for this until the Great Eastern Railway Act 1862 (25 & 26 Vict. c. ccxxiii) was passed on 7 August 1862, when the Great Eastern Railway (GER) was formed by the amalgamation.

The system settled down for the next six decades, apart from the disruption of the First World War. The difficult economic circumstances after the war led the Government to pass the Railways Act 1921 which led to the creation of the Big Four railway companies. The GER amalgamated with other railways to create the London and North Eastern Railway (LNER) on 1 January 1923.

In 1948, the line came under the British Railways Eastern Region.

=== Accidents and incidents ===
- On 9 January 1847, two ballastmen were killed when the wagon they were travelling on broke up near Lakenheath.
- On 5 January 1854, two trains were in collision near Thetford.
- On 1 July 1865, a passenger train was derailed as it passed under the viaduct carrying the Great Eastern Main Line at Lakenham, Norfolk. Three people sustained minor injuries.
- On 12 October 1870, a mail train collided with a freight train at Brandon.
- On 9 January 1875, a mail train ran into the rear of a freight train at Thetford. At least five people were injured.
- On 1 June 1875, a cattle train derailed at Harling Road.
- On 13 January 1879, a freight train ran into the rear of a passenger train at Wymondham. Several passengers were injured.
- On 19 January 1880, a freight train ran into the rear of another at Brandon.
- On 6 July 1881, a light engine was in collision with a passenger train at Wymondham North Junction. Thirteen people were injured.
- On 7 April 1906, a passenger train was derailed at Shippea Hill due to excessive speed. Eight passengers were injured, two seriously.
- On 4 June 1926, a motor bus crashed through the parapet of an overbridge at Thetford and landed on top of a stationary train.
- On 7 January 1927, a freight train, hauled by ex-GER Class Y14 0-6-0 No. 7613, was in collision with a lorry at Roudham Heath, Norfolk due to errors by the crossing keeper. The lorry driver was killed.
- In December 1970, a passenger train collided with a lorry on a level crossing at Shippea Hill. The driver of the train was killed.
- On 3 December 1976, a passenger train collided with a lorry on an unstaffed level crossing at Shippea Hill. The train driver was killed and eight of his passengers were injured.
- On 12 September 2006, Class 170 diesel multiple unit 170 206 was derailed as it crossed the level crossing at Croxton, Norfolk. A panel that formed part of the level crossing had become dislodged and fouled both railway and road.

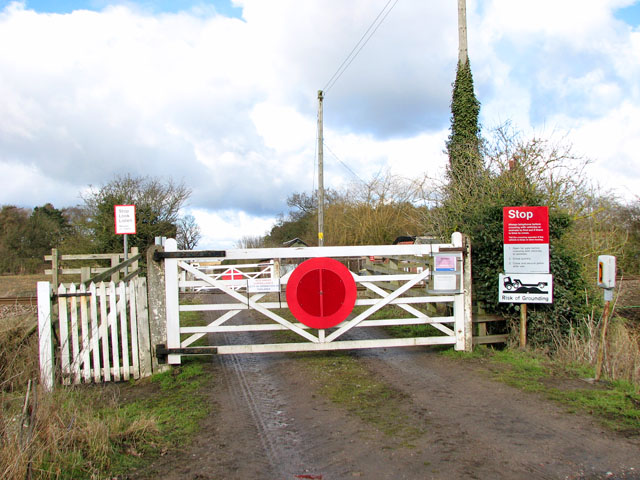
The private level crossing on the Roudham Hall estate, which was the scene of an accident on 10 April 2016.

- On 10 April 2016, Class 170 unit 170 204 collided with an agricultural tractor on a private level crossing at Roudham, Norfolk. The tractor driver was seriously injured, the train driver and six passengers sustained minor injuries. A preliminary investigation revealed that the tractor driver had obtained permission to cross the line.
- On 6 February 2024, Class 158 unit 158 856 collided with a fallen tree and was derailed between Thetford and Harling Road stations. One of the 31 passengers on board was injured. The RAIB opened an investigation into the accident.

== Infrastructure ==
The line is double-track throughout but is only electrified between Cambridge and Ely, and also between Norwich and Trowse Junction, at 25 kV AC. It has a loading gauge of W8, except for the section connecting the Ipswich–Ely line to the Ely–Peterborough line, which is W10. The line speed ranges between 40 and 90 mph (64–145 km/h).

Until 2012 the line retained its historic characteristics, with well preserved stations, semaphore signalling and, until spring 2009, lineside telegraph poles, along with sections of jointed rail on wooden sleepers. However, the two-stage Ely–Norwich re-signalling programme in August and December 2012 involved the closure of the nine local mechanical signal boxes and removal of the seven sets of manually operated wooden gates at level crossings. The Cambridge signal box now controls the modern electronic interlockings which operate the lightweight LED signals, while the level crossings have been fully automated with barriers and warning lights.

== Route ==
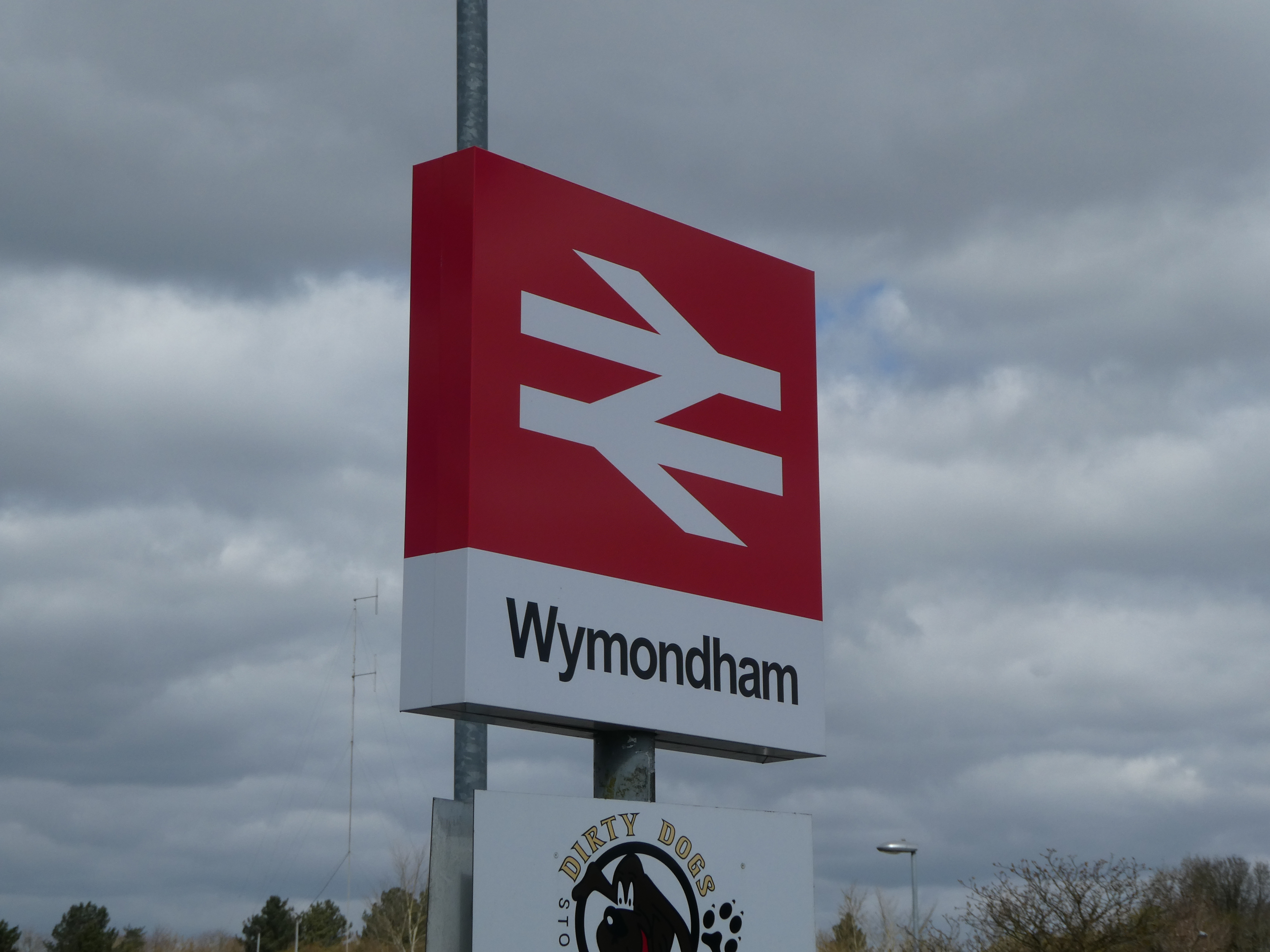
The Wymondham station sign

The places served by the route are listed below, with Ordnance Survey grid references provided for the stations:

Place	Station and grid reference
Norwich	Norwich: TG239083
Wymondham	Wymondham: TG114009
Spooner Row	Spooner Row: TM094974
Attleborough	Attleborough: TM051950
Eccles and Quidenham	Eccles Road: TM018900
East Harling	Harling Road: TL977879
Thetford	Thetford: TL867836
Brandon	Brandon: TL784872
Lakenheath	Lakenheath: TL723863
Burnt Fen area	Shippea Hill: TL641841
Ely	Ely: TL543793
Cambridge North	Cambridge North: TL475606
Cambridge	Cambridge: TL461572

Trains pass through Waterbeach station between Ely and Cambridge North without stopping.

Prickwillow station, between Ely and Shippea Hill stations, closed in 1850.

== Services ==
Some of the stations on the Breckland line see just one stopping train in each direction per day, mostly in the Norwich direction in the morning and in the Cambridge direction in the afternoon or evening. Three stations on the line are request stops only: Spooner Row, Lakenheath and Shippea Hill. Harling Road and Eccles Road have peak-hour only services: two in each direction each day, Monday to Saturday (two in the morning to Norwich and two westbound in the evening, one of which is operated by East Midlands Railway on weekdays only).

Passenger services are operated by several companies:

- Greater Anglia operates a typically hourly service between Stansted Airport and Norwich, using Class 755 bi-mode multiple units which replaced the Class 170s in 2019 and Class 720s between Cambridge and Cambridge North on its services to London Liverpool Street.
- East Midlands Railway operates various services between Ely and Norwich, as part of its Liverpool–Norwich route, usually using Class 158 DMUs, although Class 170 DMUs may sometimes be used.
- CrossCountry operates various services between Cambridge and Ely as part of its Birmingham–Stansted Airport route, usually using Class 170 DMUs.
- Great Northern operates various services between Cambridge and Ely as part of the Fen line route to King's Lynn, using Class 387 electric multiple units.
