= Eccles Road railway station =

Railway station in Norfolk, England

Coordinates: 52.47062°N 0.96961°E

Eccles Road
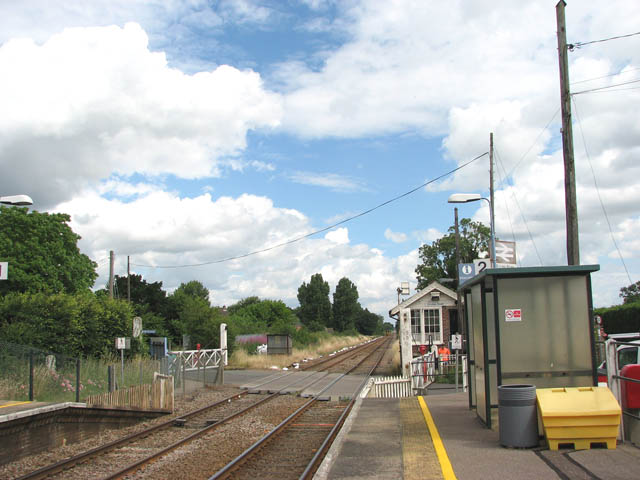

General information
- Location: Quidenham, Breckland; England
- Grid reference: TM018900
- Manager: Greater Anglia
- Platforms: 2

Other information
- Station code: ECS
- Classification: DfT category F2

Key dates
- 30 July 1845: Opened
- 18 April 1966: Closed to freight

Passengers
- 2021/22: ▲1,276
- 2022/23: ▲1,830
- 2023/24: ▼1,568
- 2024/25: ▼1,534
- 2025/26: ▲2,718
Location
Notes
- Passenger statistics from the Office of Rail and Road

Eccles Road railway station is on the Breckland line in the east of England, serving the villages of Eccles, Quidenham and Wilby in Norfolk. The line runs between Cambridge in the west and Norwich in the east.

Eccles Road is situated between Harling Road and Attleborough, 104 miles 36 chains (168.1 km) from London Liverpool Street via Ely. The station is managed by Greater Anglia, which also operates most of the services calling at the station. Some East Midlands Railway also stop at Eccles Road.

The station takes its name from being outside of the now abandoned original village of Eccles although the church Eccles St. Mary still stands and is one of 124 original round-tower churches in Norfolk. A new settlement, also called Eccles, has developed around the station. The station is situated in the civil parish of Quidenham, about 2 miles (3 km) north of that village, and 1 mile (1.5 km) north-east of Snetterton Motor Racing Circuit.

The station is unstaffed and has two platforms, adjacent to a level crossing. Wooden level crossing gates used to be opened and closed manually by a signaller in the local signal box, which is dated 1883. However, in 2012 the signal box was closed and the crossing was renewed with barriers controlled from Cambridge. The redundant signal box still stands across the road from the westbound (Cambridge) platform (as of 2024).

== History ==
The Norwich and Brandon Railway Act 1844 (7 & 8 Vict. c. xv) authorising the Norwich and Brandon Railway (N&BR) received royal assent on 10 May 1844. Work started on the line in 1844 and the line and its stations were opened on 30 July 1845. The line ran from Ely to Trowse, in Norwich. The link into Norwich was delayed due to the need to build a bridge over the River Wensum that kept the river navigable. One month before the N&BR opened, the Norfolk Railway Act 1845 (8 & 9 Vict. c. xli) authorising the amalgamation of the Yarmouth and Norwich Railway with the N&BR came into effect and so Eccles Road station became a Norfolk Railway asset.

== Services ==
As of October 2024, Monday to Saturday there are two trains per day eastbound to Norwich, at 06:55 and 07:56 - both are timed to arrive in Norwich before 09:00 and operated by Greater Anglia.

Westbound, there are two trains per day on weekday afternoons, one operated by East Midlands Railway which calls at Harling Road, Thetford, and Ely, before reversing and continuing to Liverpool Lime Street; and the other to Cambridge, operated by Greater Anglia. On Saturday afternoons there are two westbound services to Stansted Airport via Cambridge, both operated by Greater Anglia.

There is no Sunday service.

Preceding station	National Rail	Following station
Harling Road	Greater Anglia Breckland line	Attleborough
