= Attleborough railway station =

Railway station in Norfolk, England

Attleborough
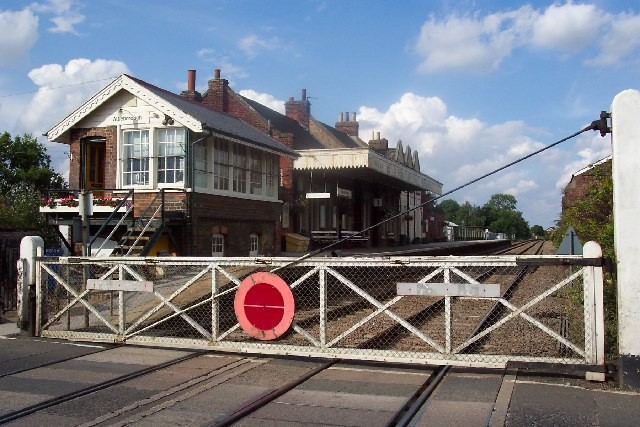

General information
- Location: Attleborough, Breckland; England
- Coordinates: 52.51428°N 1.02119°E
- Grid reference: TM051950
- Managed by: Greater Anglia
- Platforms: 2

Other information
- Station code: ATL
- Classification: DfT category F1

Key dates
- 30 July 1845: Opened
- 12 September 1966: Closed to freight

Passengers
- 2020/21: ▼41,592
- 2021/22: ▲0.132 million
- 2022/23: ▲0.169 million
- 2023/24: ▲0.172 million
- 2024/25: ▲0.175 million
Location
Notes
- Passenger statistics from the Office of Rail and Road

Attleborough railway station is on the Breckland line in the east of England, serving the market town of Attleborough, Norfolk. The line runs between Cambridge in the west and Norwich in the east. Attleborough is situated between Eccles Road and Spooner Row, 108 miles 19 chains (174.2 km) from London Liverpool Street via Ely.

The station is managed by Greater Anglia, which also operates most of the services calling at the station. Some East Midlands Railway also stop at Attleborough.

== History ==
The Norwich and Brandon Railway Act 1844 (7 & 8 Vict. c. xv) authorising for the Norwich and Brandon Railway (N&BR) received royal assent on 10 May 1844. The line was to link with an Eastern Counties Railway (ECR) project of a line from Newport in Essex to Brandon in Norfolk. Once complete the line would enable trains to travel from Norwich to London. Work started on the line in 1844.

One month before the N&BR opened a bill authorising the amalgamation of the Yarmouth and Norwich Railway with the N&BR came into effect and so Attleborough station became a Norfolk Railway asset.

The line opened on 30 July 1845 including the ECR Brandon to Newport line. However, the line only got to Trowse, in the suburbs of Norwich, as the contractors were having to build a swing bridge to cross the navigable River Wensum. Attleborough station was, as it is now, situated east of Eccles Road station and west of Spooner Row station.

Two years after opening the Norfolk Railway closed Spooner Row in September 1847. This meant Wymondham was the next station east of Attleborough.

The ECR and its rival the Eastern Union Railway (EUR) were both sizing up the NR to acquire and expand their railway empire. The ECR trumped the EUR by taking over the NR, including Attleborough Station on 8 May 1848.

Seven years after the ECR took over the NR Spooner Row reopened on 1 December 1855.

Five years after its reopening Spooner Row closed for a second time on 1 August 1860, once again leaving Wymondham as the next station east of Attleborough.

Two years after Spooner Row station closed the railways in East Anglia were in financial trouble, and most were leased to the Eastern Counties Railway, which wished to amalgamate formally but could not obtain government agreement for this until the Great Eastern Railway Act 1862 (25 & 26 Vict. c. ccxxiii) was passed on 7 August 1862, when the Great Eastern Railway (GER) was formed by the amalgamation. Actually, Attleborough became a GER station on 1 July 1862 when the GER took over the ECR and the EUR before the bill received royal assent.

20 years after the GER was formed Spooner Row reopened for the third and final time.

The system settled down for the next four decades, apart from the disruption of First World War. The difficult economic circumstances that existed after World War I led the government to pass the Railways Act 1921 which led to the creation of the Big Four. The GER was absorbed into the London and North Eastern Railway (LNER). Attleborough became a LNER station on 1 January 1923.

On nationalisation in 1948 the station and its services came under the management of the Eastern Region of British Railways.

The station's ticket office was closed in the 1960s.

Upon privatisation in the 1990s the station and most of its services were transferred to Anglia Railways, with services to the Midlands being transferred to Central Trains.

On 1 April 2004 management of the station passed on to National Express East Anglia, then known as "one".

On 11 November 2007, services to Liverpool were transferred to East Midlands Trains upon the breakup of the Central Trains franchise.

In 2008 NXEA opened a new ticket office at Attleborough as part of its Rural Stations Restaffing Initiative, almost 41 years to the day since the original office was closed. This has also been closed (exact date unknown), and has been replaced by a ticket machine.

On 5 February 2012, the station and most of its services were transferred to Abellio Greater Anglia.

Wooden level crossing gates adjacent to the station used to be opened and closed manually by a signaller in the local signal box. However, in 2012 the signal box was closed and the crossing was renewed with automatic barriers with warning lights.

On 18 August 2019, all services operated by East Midlands Trains were transferred to East Midlands Railway upon the expiry of the former's franchise.

There is no footbridge at this station.

== Services ==
Services at Attleborough are operated by Greater Anglia and East Midlands Railway.

The typical service is one train per hour in each direction between Norwich and Cambridge, operated by Greater Anglia. Most westbound services are extended beyond Cambridge to and from Stansted Airport.

The station is also served by a limited East Midlands Railway service of three trains per day in each direction between Norwich and Liverpool Lime Street via Nottingham. On Sundays, East Midlands Railway operate four trains per day towards Norwich only.

Preceding station	National Rail	Following station
Thetford	Greater Anglia Breckland Line	Wymondham
Eccles Road Limited Service	Greater Anglia Breckland Line	Spooner Row Limited Service
Thetford or Eccles Road	East Midlands Railway: Norwich to Liverpool; Limited Service	Wymondham
