= Trowse railway station =

Disused railway station in Norfolk, England

Coordinates: 52.615°N 1.314°E

Trowse
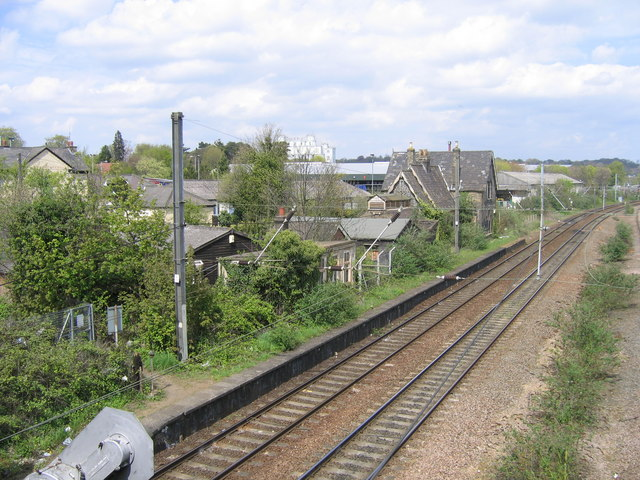

General information
- Location: Trowse, City of Norwich; England
- Grid reference: TG243071
- Platforms: 2

Other information
- Status: Disused

History
- Original company: Norfolk Railway
- Pre-grouping: Great Eastern Railway
- Post-grouping: London and North Eastern Railway, Eastern Region of British Railways

Key dates
- 30 July 1845: Opened
- 15 December 1845: Resited
- May 1848: Closed
- September 1851: Reopened
- 22 May 1916: Closed
- 1 April 1919: Reopened
- 5 September 1939: Closed
- 28 March 1986: Reopened
- 31 March 1986: Closed

Listed Building – Grade II
- Official name: Trowse Railway Station
- Designated: 21 December 2021
- Reference no.: 1478346
Location

Trowse was a railway station on the Great Eastern Main Line that served the village of Trowse, Norfolk, England. It was opened around the same time as Norwich Thorpe and was intended to provide a short commute from the outer suburbs of Norwich.

== History ==
The Norwich and Brandon Railway Act 1844 (7 & 8 Vict. c. xv) authorising the Norwich and Brandon Railway (N&BR) received royal assent on 10 May 1844. Work started on the line in 1844; the line and its stations were opened on 30 July 1845. Trowse station opened with the line and was situated west of Hethersett station. The line temporarily terminated at Trowse. The link into Norwich was delayed due to the need to build a bridge over the River Wensum that kept the river navigable. One month before the N&BR opened the Norfolk Railway Act 1845 (8 & 9 Vict. c. xli) was passed authorising the amalgamation of the Yarmouth and Norwich Railway with the N&BR came into effect and so Trowse station became a Norfolk Railway asset.

On 15 December 1845, a swing bridge over the River Wensum was opened so Trowse ceased to be a terminus and the line from Brandon entered Norwich station five months after the original line had opened. The Norfolk Railway also opened a line from Trowse towards Yarmouth, so freight trains could avoid Thorpe station.

Trowse closed and reopened several times before closing permanently in 1939. It was briefly reopened in March 1986, when Norwich station was temporarily closed for electrification works, and it served as the line's northern terminus. It closed again when the works finished.

== Former services ==
Preceding station	Disused railways	Following station
Norwich Thorpe	Great Eastern Railway; Great Eastern Main Line	Swainsthorpe
Hethersett	Great Eastern Railway	Whitlingham

== The site today ==
The station is still largely in place and could be reopened should it ever be desired. Its close proximity to Norwich station makes this unlikely at present, though discussions regarding a possible reopening have taken place.

In July 2025, the arch company was given permission by Norwich City Council to restore and redevelop the station buildings into commercial space, as of April 2026 the station is covered in scaffolding.

== See also ==
- Trowse Bridge
- Norwich Thorpe railway station
- Norwich Victoria railway station
