= Harling Road railway station =

Railway station in Norfolk, England

Coordinates: 52.45326°N 0.90808°E

Harling Road
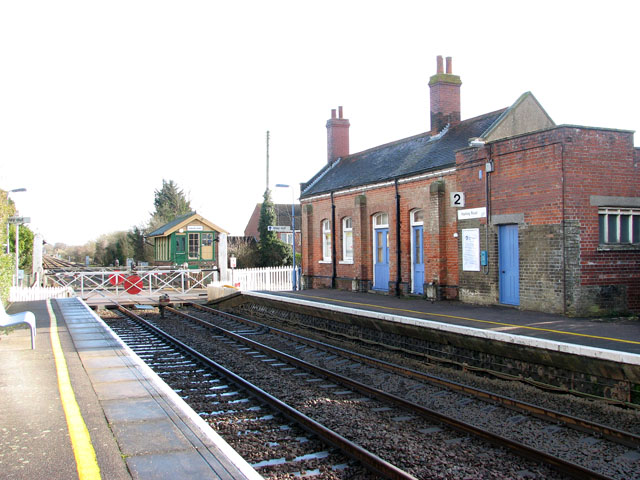

General information
- Location: East Harling, Breckland; England
- Grid reference: TL978879
- Manager: Greater Anglia
- Platforms: 2

Other information
- Station code: HRD
- Classification: DfT category F2

Key dates
- 30 July 1845: Opened as Harling
- September 1849: Renamed Harling Road
- 28 December 1964: Closed to freight

Passengers
- 2021/22: ▲978
- 2022/23: ▲2,104
- 2023/24: ▲3,364
- 2024/25: ▼1,768
- 2025/26: ▲1,772
Location
Notes
- Passenger statistics from the Office of Rail and Road

Harling Road railway station is on the Breckland line in the east of England, serving the villages of Larling, Roudham and East Harling, Norfolk. The line runs between Cambridge in the west and Norwich in the east.

Harling Road is situated between Thetford and Eccles Road, 101 miles 35 chains (163.2 km) from London Liverpool Street via Ely. The station is managed by Greater Anglia, which also operates most of the services calling at the station. Some East Midlands Railway also stop at Harling Road.

== History ==
The Norwich and Brandon Railway Act 1844 (7 & 8 Vict. c. xv) authorising the Norwich and Brandon Railway (N&BR) received royal assent on 10 May 1844. Work started on the line in 1844 and the line and its stations were opened on 30 July 1845. The line ran from Ely to Trowse, in Norwich. The link into Norwich was delayed due to the need to build a bridge over the River Wensum that kept the river navigable. One month before the N&BR opened the Norfolk Railway Act 1845 (8 & 9 Vict. c. xli), which authorised the amalgamation of the Yarmouth and Norwich Railway with the N&BR, came into effect and so Harling station became a Norfolk Railway asset.

== Description ==
The station is situated approximately 1.5 miles (2.4 km) north-west of East Harling, the village from which it takes its name. A footpath links the station to the village.

Harling Road is a small station and until recently had remained largely outdated. The wooden level crossing gates adjacent to the station used to be opened and closed manually by a signaller in the Harling Road signal box. In December 2012 the signal box was closed and the crossing was renewed with automatic barriers with warning lights.

Passenger facilities are basic, with a car-park and seating in a shelter on the eastbound (Norwich) platform only. There is a bicycle shelter on the westbound (Cambridge) platform. There is no ticket office, and tickets may be bought from the conductor on the train.

Harling Road is located in a rural area, and is ideally placed to provide access to the countryside for those who can not, or do not wish to, make use of a car for transportation. There is easy access to several long-distance footpaths, including the Peddars Way, Angles Way, Icknield Way, Iceni Way and the Hereward Way. There are a number of other opportunities with Knettishall Heath, West Harling Heath and Wayland Wood (where the events that inspired the Babes in the Wood took place) all being within walking distance.

== Services ==
As of December 2019, from Monday to Saturday there are two trains per day eastbound to Norwich, both timed to arrive in Norwich before 09:00 and operated by Greater Anglia.

Westbound, there are two trains per day on weekday afternoons, one operated by East Midlands Railway which calls at Thetford and Ely before reversing and continuing to Liverpool Lime Street; and the other to Cambridge, operated by Greater Anglia. On Saturday afternoons there are two westbound services to Stansted Airport via Cambridge, both operated by Greater Anglia.

There is no Sunday service.

Preceding station	National Rail	Following station
Thetford	Greater Anglia Breckland Line	Eccles Road
	Historical railways	
Roudham Junction; Line open, station closed	Great Eastern Railway; Norfolk Railway	Eccles Road; Line and station open
