= Hethersett railway station =

Former railway station in Norfolk, England

Coordinates: 52.5917°N 1.2031°E

Hethersett
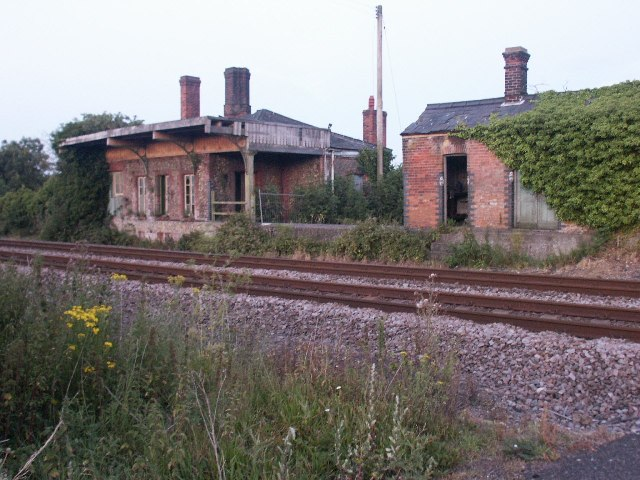

General information
- Location: Hethersett, South Norfolk; England
- Grid reference: TG170041
- Platforms: 2

Other information
- Status: Disused

History
- Original company: Norfolk Railway
- Pre-grouping: Great Eastern Railway
- Post-grouping: London and North Eastern Railway; Eastern Region of British Railways

Key dates
- 30 July 1845: Opened
- September 1847: Closed
- February 1852: Reopened
- 28 December 1964: Closed to freight
- 31 January 1966: Closed to passengers
Location

Hethersett was a railway station near Hethersett, Norfolk.

== History ==
The Norwich and Brandon Railway Act 1844 (7 & 8 Vict. c. xv) authorising the Norwich and Brandon Railway (N&BR) received royal assent on 10 May 1844. Work started on the line in 1844 and the line and its stations were opened on 30 July 1845. Hethersett station opened with the line and was situated east of Spink's Lane station and west of Trowse station. The line ran from Ely to Trowse, in Norwich. The link into Norwich was delayed due to the need to build a bridge over the River Wensum that kept the river navigable. One month before the N&BR opened the Norfolk Railway Act 1845 (8 & 9 Vict. c. xli) was passed authorising the amalgamation of the Yarmouth and Norwich Railway with the N&BR came into effect and so Hethersett station became a Norfolk Railway (NR) asset.

Spink's Lane was closed in November 1845, so the next station west of Hethersett was Wymondham.

The NR closed Hethersett station in September 1847.

Five years later and four years after the Eastern Counties Railway (ECR) took over the NR the new owners reopened Hethersett Station.

A decade after Hethersett reopened, the railways in East Anglia were in financial trouble, and most were leased to the ECR, which wished to amalgamate formally but could not obtain government agreement for this until the Great Eastern Railway Act 1862 (25 & 26 Vict. c. ccxxiii) was passed on 7 August 1862, when the Great Eastern Railway (GER) was formed by the amalgamation. Hethersett became a GER station on 1 July 1862 when the GER took over the ECR.

The GER amalgamated with other railways to form the London and North Eastern Railway (LNER) on 1 January 1923, so Hethersett became a LNER station. On 1 January 1948 Hethersett became a British Railways (BR) station.

Hethersett Station was now served by Diesel trains from 1962. British Transport Commission (1954).

BR closed Hethersett station on 31 January 1966.

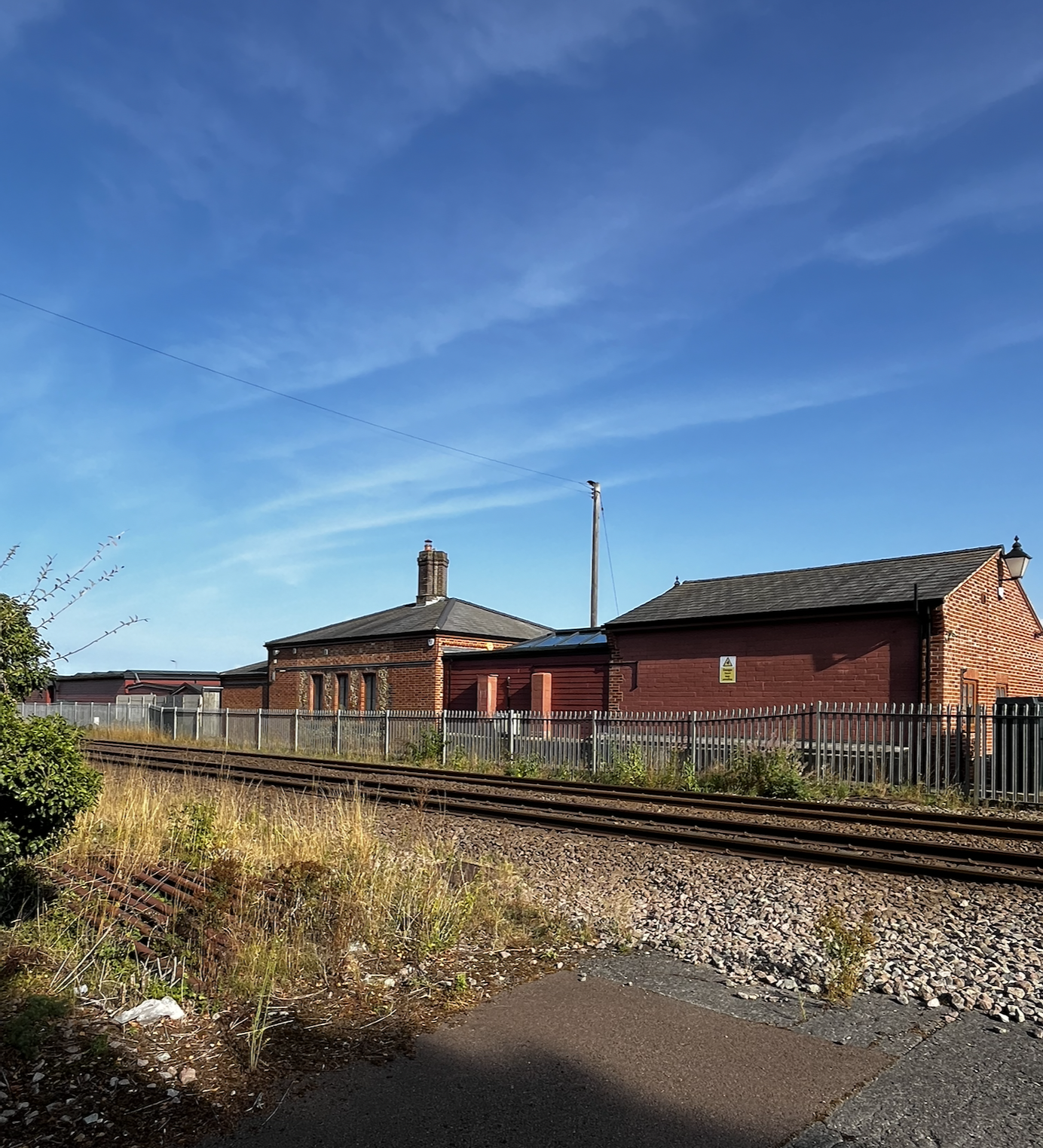
Hethersett railway station in 2026

Hethersett was located some distance from the village it took its name from. It was located on the Great Eastern Main Line between Norwich and Thetford. Despite its remote location, the station was served by between ten and twelve trains a day each way during the early 1960s. Following closure, the platforms were removed and the station building stood derelict for many years. It has now been restored and is an industrial premises.

Preceding station	Disused railways	Following station
Spinks Lane	Great Eastern Railway	Trowse
