= East Harling =

Village in Norfolk, England

Coordinates: 52.44011°N 0.93076°E

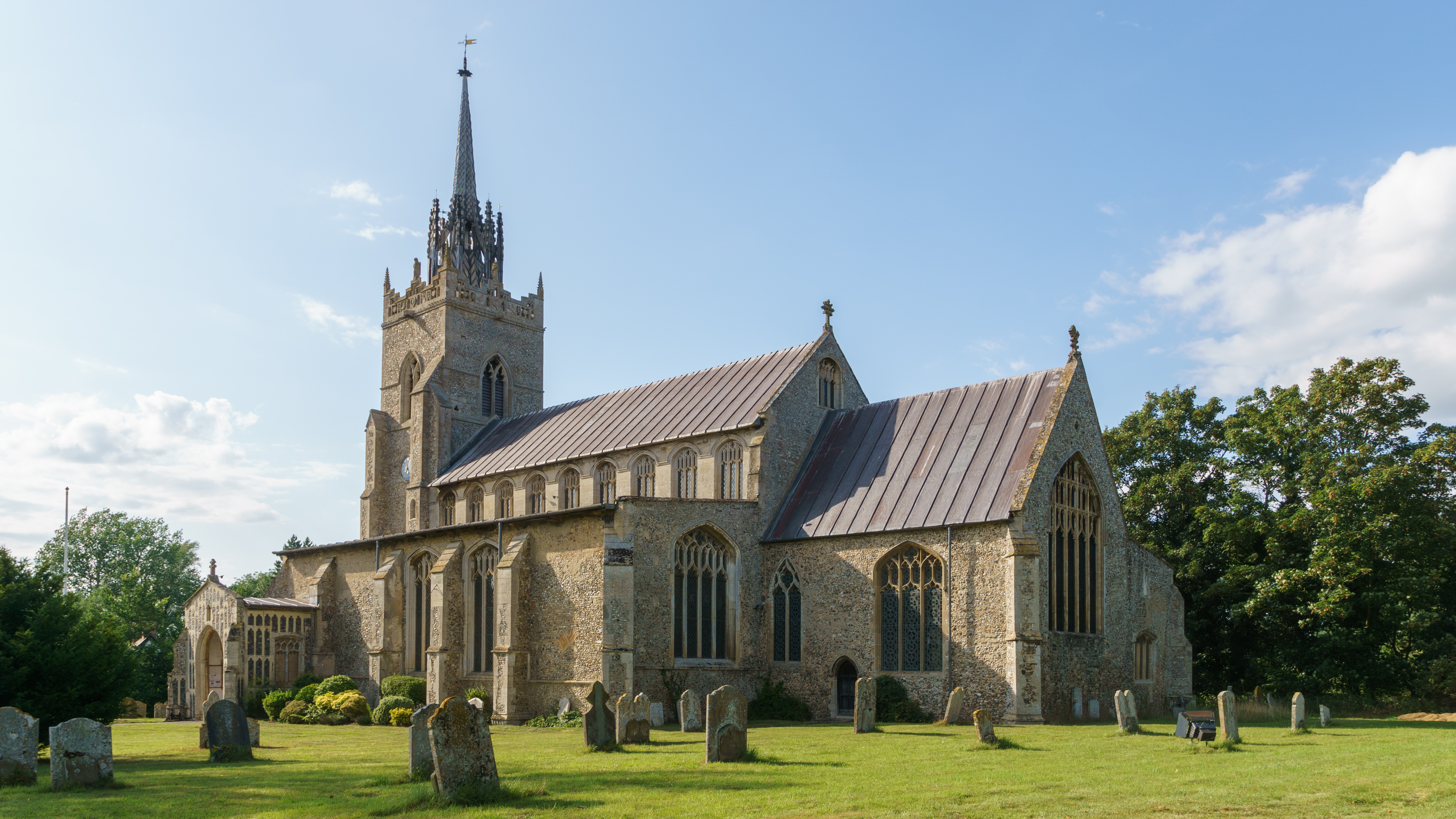
- The Church of St Peter and St Paul

- Location within Norfolk
- Area: 0.36 sq mi (0.93 km^{2})
- Population: 2,489 (2021 census)
  - Density: 6,914/sq mi (2,670/km^{2})
- OS grid reference: TL 993 865
- Civil parish: Harling
- District: Breckland
- Shire county: Norfolk
- Region: East
- Country: England
- Sovereign state: United Kingdom
- Post town: NORWICH
- Postcode district: NR16
- Dialling code: 01953
- Police: Norfolk
- Fire: Norfolk
- Ambulance: East of England
- UK Parliament: South West Norfolk

East Harling is a village in the civil parish of Harling in the Breckland district of the English county of Norfolk.

East Harling is located 8 miles (13 km) east of Thetford and 25 miles (40 km) south-west of Norwich on the banks of the River Thet.

== History ==
East Harling's name is of Anglo-Saxon origin and derives from the Old English for the eastern part of the settlement of 'Herela's' people.

In the Domesday Book, East Harling and West Harling are recorded together as a settlement of 91 households in the hundred of Guiltcross. In 1086, the villages were divided between the estates of King William I, Count Alan of Brittany, St. Edmunds' Abbey, William d'Ecouis and Robert de Verly.

Harling Old Hall was built in 1490 on the site of an existing building called Herling's Hall and was demolished in the Nineteenth Century.

From 1808 to 1814, East Harling hosted a station in the shutter telegraph chain connecting the Admiralty in London to the fleet in Great Yarmouth.

In 1931 the civil parish had a population of 900. On 1 April 1935 the parish was abolished and merged with West Harling to form "Harling".

In 1992, a German field gun was found buried during excavations around a residential building. It is likely that the gun was given as a prize to the village after the First World War and was buried in the Second World War.

On 13 December 1943, a B-17 Flying Fortress of the 96th Bomb Group crashed near the village trying to return to RAF Snetterton Heath after a bombing raid on Hamburg. Before crashing, the aircraft dumped its bombload in a field which shattered many windows in the village. Furthermore, during the Second World War, several pillboxes were built to defend against a possible German invasion.

== Geography ==
According to the 2021 census, East Harling has a population of 2,489 people which shows an increase from the 2,142 people recorded in the 2011 census.

In 1931 the civil parish had a population of 900. This was the last time separate population statistics were collected for the village as the parish was merged with West Harling in 1935.

== Church of St Peter and St Paul ==
East Harling's parish church is dedicated to Saint Peter and Saint Paul, and was built in its current state on the site of an earlier church during the 15th century from the fortune of Anne Harling, an orphan of the Hundred Years War. The church is Grade I listed and has a hammerbeam roof which rises to a height of 45 feet above the floor. The building contains many other medieval survivals such as the panels of the chancel screen, an older screen surrounding the Lady Chapel with intricate carvings in its spandrels, choir stalls in the chancel, remains of a mural and the octagonal font. There are also a number of tombs. The most noteworthy feature of the church, however, is the magnificent east window which was donated to the church by Lady Anne Herling and her second husband, Sir Robert Wingfield, in around 1460. The glass was removed and hidden in the since demolished East Harling Hall, for fear of destruction by Puritan iconoclasts. The glass was restored in 1736 under the direction of Thomas Wright and has stood in its current position since, excepting during the Second World War.

== Transport ==
Harling Road railway station opened in 1845 as a stop on the Norwich and Brandon Railway, the station remains open to this day on the Breckland Line between Cambridge and Norwich.

== Governance ==
East Harling is part of the electoral ward of Harling & Heathlands for local elections and is part of the district of Breckland.

The village's national constituency is South West Norfolk which has been represented by Labour's Terry Jermy MP since 2024.

== War memorial ==
East Harling's war memorial takes the form of a stone obelisk featuring a sword of sacrifice upon a Celtic cross at the junction between Cheese Hill, Market Street and White Hart Street. The committee to erect a war memorial was headed by Colonel E. Mornement who had raised £227 by June 1919, the memorial was unveiled in May 1920 by Walter Keppel, 9th Earl of Albemarle and John Bowers, Bishop of Thetford. The memorial lists the following names for the First World War:

Rank	Name	Unit	Date of death	Burial/Commemoration
Lt.	P. C. Richards MC	9th Bn., South African Army	12 Feb. 1917	Barkly West Cemetery
CSM	Henry R. Pattinson	1/4th Bn., Norfolk Regiment	19 Apr. 1917	Jerusalem Memorial
Sgt.	H. J. Smith MM	1st Bn., Norfolk Regt.	27 Jul. 1916	Thiepval Memorial
LCpl.	Walter E. Endley	1/4th Bn., Norfolk Regt.	8 Oct. 1915	Helles Memorial
LCpl.	Stephen A. Miller	1/4th Bn., Norfolk Regt.	16 Aug. 1915	Helles Memorial
Pte.	Herbert Secker	2nd Bn., Bedfordshire Regiment	12 Oct. 1916	Thiepval Memorial
Pte.	John Osborne	7th (British Columbia) Bn., CEF	10 Nov. 1917	Menin Gate
Pte.	Horace B. Howlett	8th (Winnipeg Rifles) Bn., CEF	24 Apr. 1915	Menin Gate
Pte.	Joseph J. Hunt	10th Bn., East Yorkshire Regiment	25 Aug. 1918	St. Omer Cemetery
Pte.	Robert Frost	1st Bn., Essex Regiment	14 Apr. 1917	Arras Memorial
Pte.	Ernest W. Germany	1st Bn., Essex Regt.	14 Apr. 1917	Arras Memorial
Pte.	R. J. Richards	1st Bn., Essex Regt.	12 Oct. 1916	Dartmoor Cemetery
Pte.	Oliver Bullman	2nd Bn., Essex Regt.	10 Oct. 1917	Cement House Cemetery
Pte.	Edgar Bateman	13th Bn., Essex Regt.	28 Apr. 1917	Arras Memorial
Pte.	Harry V. Barnard	17th Bn., Royal Fusiliers	9 Jun. 1918	Doullens Cemetery
Pte.	William R. Brown	2nd Bn., Grenadier Guards	15 Sep. 1914	La Ferte Memorial
Pte.	Sidney B. Sparkes	4th Bn., Grenadier Gds.	9 Oct. 1916	Etaples Military Cemetery
Pte.	Thomas Smith	2nd Bn., Loyal Regiment	1 Aug. 1918	Raperie Cemetery
Pte.	Clemence Harbour	Machine Gun Corps	18 Dec. 1918	East Harling Cemetery
Pte.	H. William Barnard	1st Bn., Norfolk Regiment	24 Aug. 1914	La Ferte Memorial
Pte.	John T. Bean	1st Bn., Norfolk Regt.	31 May 1915	Perth Cemetery
Pte.	John Shaw	2nd Bn., Norfolk Regt.	22 Apr. 1916	Basra Memorial
Pte.	George Z. Barnard	1/4th Bn., Norfolk Regt.	19 Apr. 1917	Jerusalem Memorial
Pte.	Fearnley Askey	8th Bn., Norfolk Regt.	17 Feb. 1917	Regina Trench Cemetery
Pte.	Frederick G. Elvin	8th Bn., Norfolk Regt.	22 May 1917	Arras Memorial
Pte.	William I. Pinner	9th Bn., Norfolk Regt.	15 Sep. 1916	Thiepval Memorial
Pte.	Derek St. C. Everett	1/5th Bn., Northumberland Fusiliers	31 Oct. 1916	Dernancourt Cemetery
Pte.	Herbert E. Alderton	1st Bn., Queen's Own Regiment	10 May 1918	Manor Park Cemetery
Pte.	John H. Tyler	8th Bn., Queen's Own Regt.	21 Mar. 1918	Pozieres Memorial
Pte.	George T. Tyler	10th Bn., South Wales Borderers	18 Sep. 1918	Gouzeaucourt Cemetery
Rfn.	Arthur H. Bloomfield	9th Bn., Royal Irish Rifles	7 Jun. 1917	Lone Tree Cemetery
Rfn.	Frederick F. Beales	12th Bn., King's Royal Rifle Corps	7 Nov. 1918	Sheerness Cemetery
Rfn.	James R. Osborne	18th (London Irish) Bn., London Regt	7 Apr. 1918	Bouzincourt Cemetery
Rfn.	Charles H. Glover	4th (Auckland) Bn., NZEF	2 Oct. 1916	Caterpillar Valley Cemetery
Rfn.	Harry E. Buck	4th (Otago) Bn., NZEF	12 Sep. 1918	Metz-en-Couture Cemetery
Sn.	George B. Bean	SS Cufic	15 Nov. 1918	East Harling Cemetery

And, the following for the Second World War:

Rank	Name	Unit	Date of death	Burial
SLt.	Barry P. Grigson	825 Sqn., att. HMS Kestrel	2 Jul. 1940	Rozenburg Cemetery
Sgt.	Cyril W. Kerridge	Royal Air Force Reserve	16 Apr. 1941	Runnymede Memorial
Cpl.	William G. Osborne	4th Bn., Royal Norfolk Regiment	12 Apr. 1944	Chungkai War Cemetery
LAC	Charles W. Hall	Royal Air Force Reserve	3 Jan. 1942	Tower Hamlets Cemetery
2AC	Kenneth E. Frost	No. 2795 Sqn., RAF Regiment	22 Oct. 1944	Kranji War Memorial
Gnr.	Derek J. Bloomfield	7th (Heavy) Regt., Royal Artillery	5 Nov. 1944	Florence War Cemetery
Pte.	Harold A. Walker	4th Bn., Royal Norfolk Regiment	7 Sep. 1939	East Harling Cemetery
Pte.	John Cross	6th Bn., Royal Norfolk Regt.	21 Sep. 1944	Kranji War Memorial
Pte.	Russell Barnard	5th Bn., Sherwood Foresters	4 Sep. 1944	Montecchio Cemetery

And: Walter F. Lake and Edward C. Wix. The memorial also lists John Shingfield of the London Heavy Rescue Service who was killed during The Blitz at Baldwins Gardens on 16 October 1940.
