= Thetford railway station =

Railway station in Norfolk, England

Coordinates: 52.4190°N 0.7455°E

Thetford
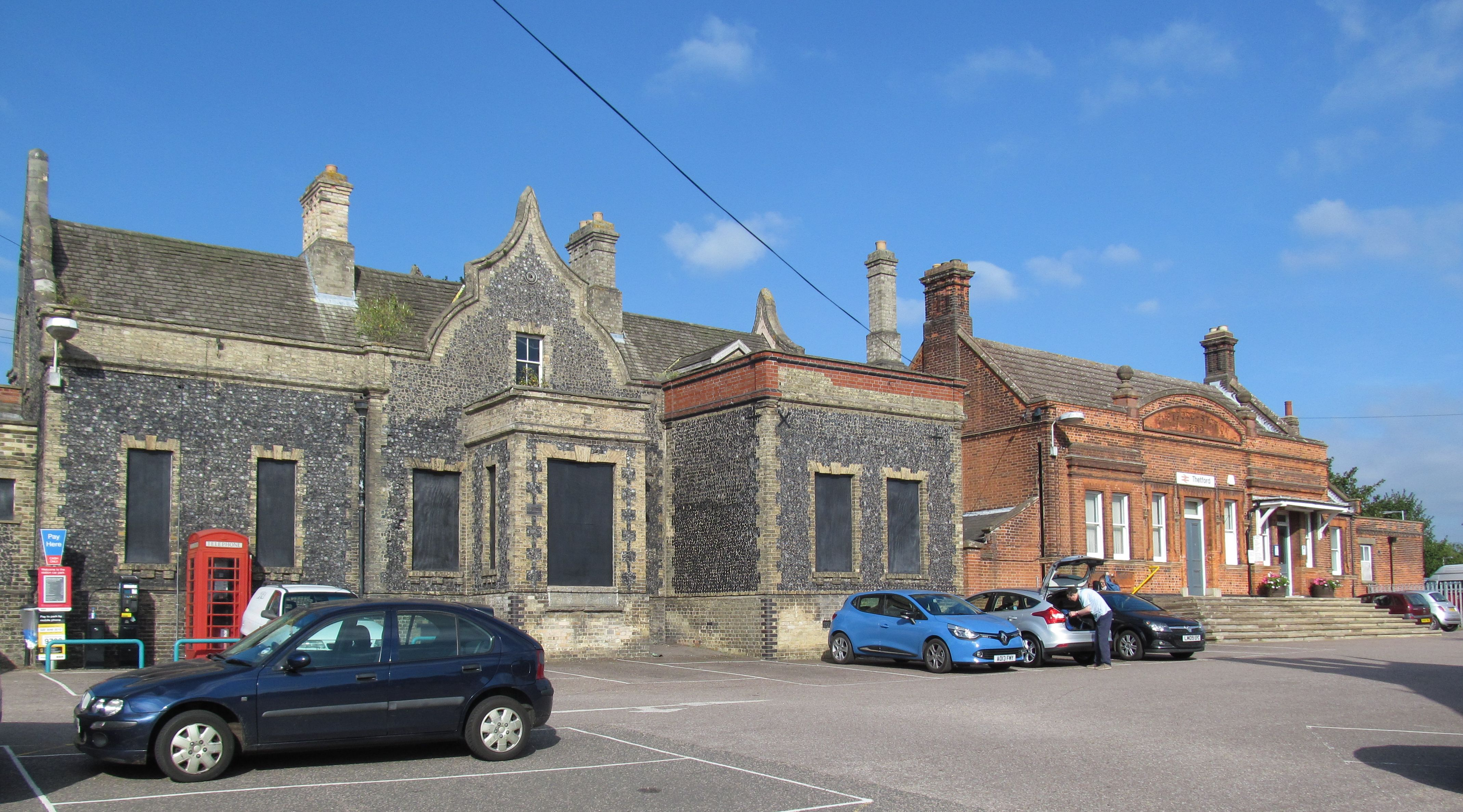

General information
- Location: Thetford, Breckland; England
- Grid reference: TL867836
- Managed by: Greater Anglia
- Platforms: 2

Other information
- Station code: TTF
- Classification: DfT category E

History
- Opened: 30 July 1845

Passengers
- 2020/21: ▼73,700
- 2021/22: ▲0.226 million
- 2022/23: ▲0.277 million
- 2023/24: ▲0.296 million
- 2024/25: ▲0.306 million
- Interchange: 6

Listed Building – Grade II
- Official name: Thetford Railway Station
- Designated: 10 March 1971
- Reference no.: 1219218
Location
Notes
- Passenger statistics from the Office of Rail and Road

Thetford railway station is on the Breckland line in the east of England, serving the market town of Thetford, Norfolk. The line runs between Cambridge in the west and Norwich in the east.

Thetford is situated between Brandon and Harling Road, 93 miles 50 chains (150.7 km) from London Liverpool Street via Ely. The station is managed by Greater Anglia, which operates most of the services, typically one to two trains per hour in either direction. East Midlands Railway operates a regular service between Norwich and Liverpool Lime Street via Nottingham and Manchester Piccadilly.

It is the nearest station to the Center Parcs holiday village at Elveden Forest, approximately 5 miles (8 km) to the west.

== History ==
The bill for the Norwich and Brandon Railway (N&BR) received royal assent on 10 May 1844 as the Norwich and Brandon Railway Act 1844 (7 & 8 Vict. c. xv). The line was to link with an Eastern Counties Railway (ECR) project of a line from Newport in Essex to Brandon in Suffolk. Once complete the line would enable trains to travel from Norwich to London. Work started on the line in 1844.

One month before the N&BR opened, the Norfolk Railway Act 1845 (8 & 9 Vict. c. xli) authorising the amalgamation of the Yarmouth and Norwich Railway with the N&BR came into effect, and so Thetford station became a Norfolk Railway (NR) asset.

The line opened on 30 July 1845, including the Eastern Counties Railway Brandon to Newport line. However, the line only went as far as Trowse, on the outskirts of Norwich, as the contractors were having to build a swing bridge to cross the River Wensum. Thetford station was, when opened, located between Brandon and Roudham Junction.

The ECR and its rival, the Eastern Union Railway (EUR), were both sizing up the NR to acquire and expand their railway empire. The ECR trumped the EUR by taking over the NR, including Thetford station, on 8 May 1848.

By the 1860s the railways in East Anglia were in financial trouble, and most were leased to the Eastern Counties Railway, which wished to amalgamate formally but could not obtain government agreement for this until the Great Eastern Railway Act 1862 (25 & 26 Vict. c. ccxxiii) received royal assent on 7 August 1862, when the Great Eastern Railway (GER) was formed by the amalgamation. Actually, Thetford became a GER station on 1 July 1862 when the GER took over the ECR and the EUR before the bill received royal assent. Also in the 1860s the GER opened a line from Roudham towards Swaffham. Roudham was renamed Roudham Junction.

A decade later the bill received royal assent, promoting a line linking Bury St Edmunds (on the Ipswich to Cambridge line) and Thetford. The Thetford and Watton Railway Act 1873 (36 & 37 Vict. c. cviii) was passed on 7 July 1873 and work was started by the Thetford and Watton Railway (T&WR) in 1874. The T&WR opened the first part of the line on 15 November 1875. The line went south and terminated at Thetford Bridge, the first station after Thetford going towards Bury St. Edmunds. The opening made Thetford a joint GER and T&WR station. Four months later the rest of the line opened to Bury St. Edmunds. Two years later the GER took over the T&WR and joint working at Thetford ended.

The system remained in place for the next four decades, apart from the disruption of First World War. The difficult economic circumstances that existed after the war led the Government to pass the Railways Act 1921, which led to the creation of the "Big Four". The GER amalgamated with several other companies to form the London and North Eastern Railway (LNER). Thetford became an LNER station on 1 January 1923.

On nationalisation in 1948, Thetford came under the auspices of the Eastern Region of British Railways.

Five years after nationalisation, British Railways decided to close the Thetford to Bury St Edmunds line. Thetford lost its junction status on 8 June 1953.

As part of the Beeching rationalisation plan, British Railways closed the Roudham Junction and Swaffham line, including Roudham Junction station, on 15 June 1964. With the closure of Roudham Junction, Harling Road became the next station after Thetford going towards Norwich. The 1960s also saw steam locomotives withdrawn and replaced by diesel multiple units.

Upon sectorisation in the 1980s the station and its services came under the Regional Railways brand.

On privatisation of British Rail, most services and management of the station passed to Anglia Railways on 5 January 1997, with services towards the Midlands transferring to Central Trains on 2 March 1997.

On 1 April 2004, the station and its operations were transferred to National Express East Anglia (NXEA). NXEA trains were initially branded as One. Three years later, on 11 November 2007, the Central Trains franchise was broken up and the Liverpool-Norwich services were taken over by East Midlands Trains.

In February 2012, the station and its other services were transferred to Abellio Greater Anglia. In August 2019, all East Midlands Trains services were transferred to East Midlands Railway upon the expiry of EMT's franchise.

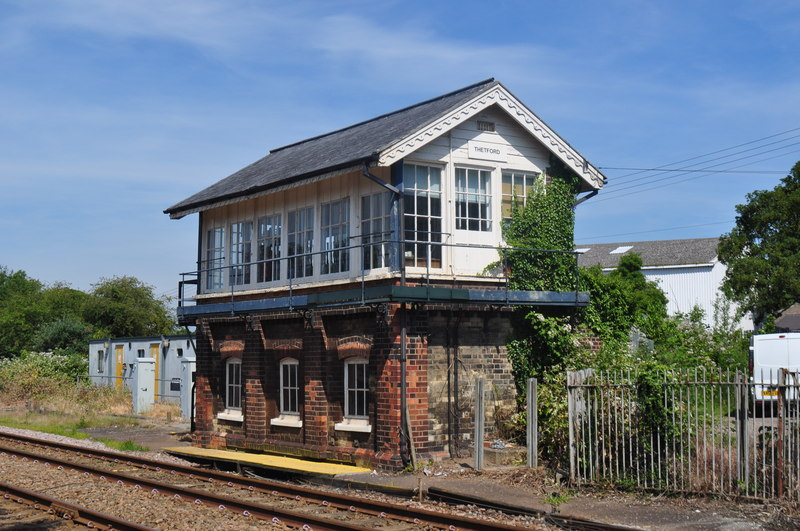
Thetford signal box in June 2010; it closed in August 2012

The original station building of knapped flint was constructed by the Norwich and Brandon Railway in 1845. The brickwork extension dates from 1889 and the year is engraved on its façade. The station complex is a Grade II listed building.

== Services ==
The station is served by Greater Anglia and East Midlands Railway.

The typical off-peak service frequency (Monday to Saturday) is:

=== Eastbound ===
- 2tph (trains per hour) to Norwich, of which 1tph is non-stop and 1tph calls at Attleborough and Wymondham (other intermediate stations have a very limited service frequency).

=== Westbound ===
- 2tph to Ely, of which:
  - 1tph continues to Cambridge, with nine trains per day now extended to Stansted Airport. This service also calls at Brandon and Cambridge North.
  - 1tph reverses at Ely and continues to Liverpool Lime Street, via Peterborough, Nottingham, Sheffield and Manchester Piccadilly. Early evening trains on this route terminate at Nottingham and there are no westbound departures after 19:30.

== Accidents ==
On 6 February 2024, an East Midlands Railway service struck a tree between Thetford and Harling Road and derailed, leaving one person with minor injuries.

Preceding station	National Rail	Following station
Brandon	Greater Anglia Breckland Line	Attleborough
Brandon	Greater Anglia Breckland Line	Harling Road (Limited services)
Ely	East Midlands Railway Liverpool-Norwich	Norwich
Brandon (Limited services)	East Midlands Railway Liverpool-Norwich	Harling Road (Limited services)
Historical railways
Brandon Line and station open	Great Eastern Railway Bury and Thetford (Swaffham Branch)	Roudham Junction Line open, station closed
Disused railways
Terminus	Great Eastern Railway Thetford to Bury St Edmunds line	Thetford Bridge Line and station closed
