= Prickwillow railway station =

Former railway station in England

Coordinates: 52.4204°N 0.3465°E

Prickwillow

General information
- Location: Prickwillow, East Cambridgeshire; England

Other information
- Status: Disused

History
- Original company: Eastern Counties Railway

Key dates
- 30 July 1845: Opened
- October 1850: Closed
Location

Prickwillow railway station was located on the line between Ely and Shippea Hill in Cambridgeshire, England. It served the village of Prickwillow, and closed in 1850.

Preceding station	Disused railways	Following station
Ely	Great Eastern Railway; Eastern Counties Railway	Shippea Hill
