= Shippea Hill railway station =

Railway station in Cambridgeshire, England

Coordinates: 52.430°N 0.413°E

Shippea Hill
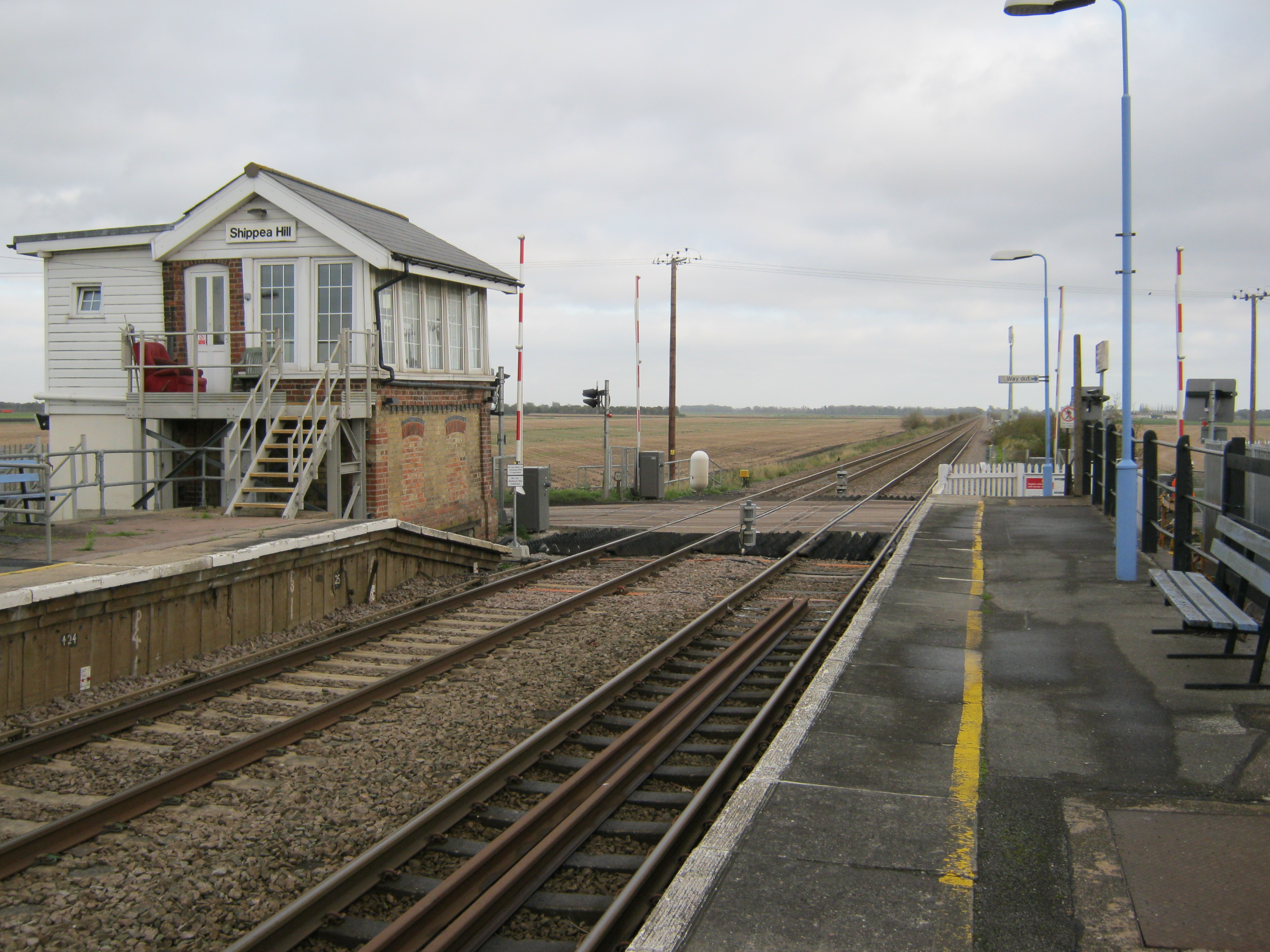
- Shippea Hill railway station in November 2012

General information
- Location: Burnt Fen, East Cambridgeshire; England
- Grid reference: TL641841
- Manager: Greater Anglia
- Platforms: 2

Other information
- Station code: SPP
- Classification: DfT category F2

Key dates
- 30 July 1845: Opened as Mildenhall Drove
- December 1845: Renamed Mildenhall Road
- 1 April 1885: Renamed Burnt Fen
- 1 May 1905: Renamed Shippea Hill

Passengers
- 2021/22: ▲102
- 2022/23: ▲142
- 2023/24: ▼70
- 2024/25: ▲76
- 2025/26: ▲154
Location
Notes
- Passenger statistics from the Office of Rail and Road

Shippea Hill railway station (originally Mildenhall Road and later Burnt Fen) is on the Breckland Line in the east of England, serving the Burnt Fen area of Cambridgeshire and Suffolk. Shippea Hill is 77 miles 17 chains (77.21 miles, 124.26 km) from London Liverpool Street (measured via Cambridge and Clapton), and is sited between Ely and Lakenheath. It has been noted for its low patronage; in 2015/16, only twelve passenger entries/exits were recorded at the station. The station is managed by Greater Anglia.

== History ==
The station was opened on 30 July 1845 as Mildenhall Drove and renamed Mildenhall Road in December of the same year, although Mildenhall itself is about 8 miles away. It was renamed Burnt Fen on 1 April 1885 and Shippea Hill on 1 May 1905. This is despite the fact that the land on which the station sits is below sea level. The station was busy in the 20th century, with freight trains transporting local produce.

On 7 April 1906, a passenger train derailed due to excessive speed. Eight passengers were injured, two seriously.

In 1975, due to local government boundary redrawings, the station became a "disputed zone", where the signal box was in Suffolk, the southern platform was in Cambridgeshire (in which the station is located today), and the northern platform was in Norfolk.

On 3 December 1976, at about 16:00, a passenger train collided with a lorry on an unstaffed level crossing near Shippea Hill. The train driver, Robert Hitcham, was killed, and eight passengers were injured.

The signal box at the station was closed in 2012, although remains in situ.

== Facilities ==
The station has only basic facilities, including cycle storage, a small car park and a shelter on the Norwich-bound platform. As there are no facilities to purchase tickets, passengers must buy one in advance, or from the guard on the train.

== Passenger volume ==
Shippea Hill has been recorded as one of the least used railway stations in Britain. According to Office of Rail and Road estimates, it was the least-used railway station in 2014/15 (with 22 passengers) and 2015/16 (12 passengers). In 2016/17 there was an increase to 156 passengers. This trend has continued in subsequent years, to a recent record of 432 passengers in 2018/19. Due to its unusual status, it sometimes attracts attempts to boost its numbers. In December 2016, Ian Cumming, a finalist from The Great British Bake Off attracted at least 16 people to the station by handing out free mince pies.

Simon Usborne of The Guardian wrote, "It's hard to imagine a more desolate place to get off a train. Shipping containers for sale stand in a muddy yard behind the far platform, opposite the pitched-roof signal box, now shuttered. Otherwise the view is of field after field, some showing maize stumps, others now peat-black and ploughed."

Geoff Marshall and Vicki Pipe featured the station on their YouTube channel All the Stations, which catalogued their attempt to visit all currently operating railway stations in Great Britain. In Episode 17, on 3 June 2017, they started their day at Shippea Hill and, with a group of 21 friends plus three unrelated genuine passengers, they doubled the 12-passenger total from 2015/16 in one day.

Passenger volume at Shippea Hill
	2004–05	2005–06	2006–07	2007–08	2008–09	2009–10	2010–11	2011–12	2012–13	2013–14	2014–15	2015–16	2016–17	2017–18	2018–19	2019–20	2020–21	2021–22	2022–23	2023–24	2024–25
Entries and exits	37	26	606	845	868	942	812	376	50	12	22	12	156	276	432	164	36	102	142	70	76

The statistics cover twelve month periods that start in April.

== Services ==
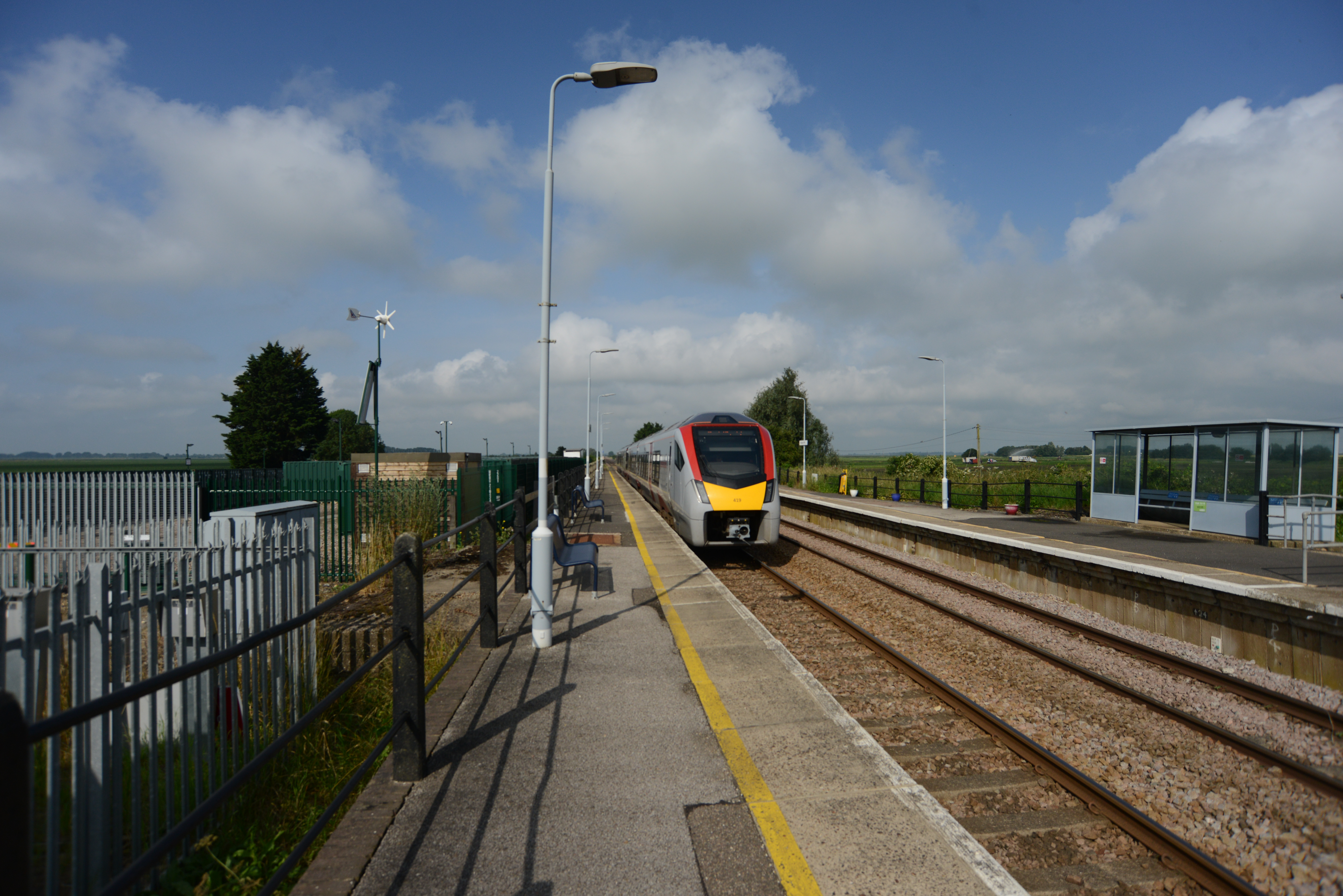
A Class 755 at Shippea Hill

In the May 2026 timetable, on weekdays the station is served by one train per day (in the morning peak) to Norwich. On Saturdays there is a service to Norwich departing at 07:47, and one train to Stansted Airport departing at 16:15. There is no Sunday service.

Despite being one stop down the line from Lakenheath, there is no direct train between the two stations.

Preceding station	National Rail	Following station
Ely	Greater Anglia Breckland Line	Lakenheath

== Bibliography ==
- Quick, Michael (2023). Railway Passenger Stations in Great Britain: A Chronology (PDF) (5th ed.). London: Railway and Canal Historical Society.
- Marshall, Geoff; Pipe, Vicki (2018). The Railway Adventures: Places, Trains, People and Stations. September Publishing. ISBN 978-1910463871.
- Wills, Dixe (2014). Tiny Stations (Paperback, 1st reprint ed.). Basingstoke: AA Publishing. ISBN 978-0-7495-7732-2.
