= Trowse Swing Bridge =

Single-track railway swing bridge in Norfolk, England

Trowse Bridge
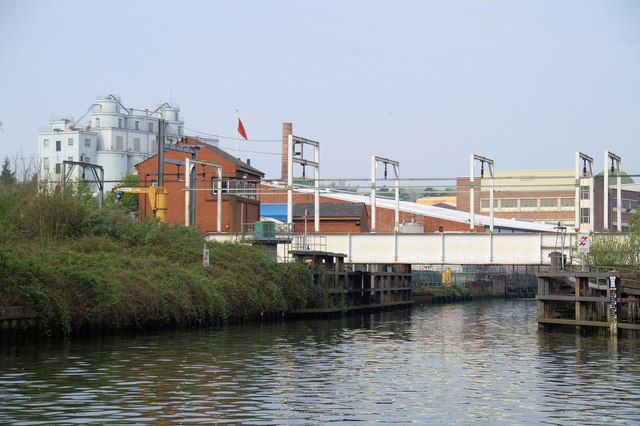
- Coordinates: 52°37′12″N 1°18′57″E
- Carries: Great Eastern Main Line
- Crosses: River Wensum
- Owner: Network Rail

Characteristics
- Width: 30 feet (9.1 m)
- Clearance below: 9 feet (2.74 m)

Rail characteristics
- No. of tracks: 1
- Track gauge: 1,435 mm (56.5 in)

History
- Constructed by: May Gurney
- Opened: May 1987

Location
- Interactive map of Trowse Bridge

Trowse Swing Bridge is the name of three railway bridges which have carried the Great Eastern Main Line over the River Wensum just outside Norwich in Norfolk, England.

== History ==
The first bridge was built in 1845 by George Parker Bidder. It was single track and built for locomotives weighing up to 30 tons. However, during its life it was used by locomotives of up to 90 tons. It was protected by interlocked signals and a 'bridgeman', whose presence on board an engine gave it the authority to proceed across the bridge. In 1905, it was replaced with a double-track bridge which was opened by electrical power.

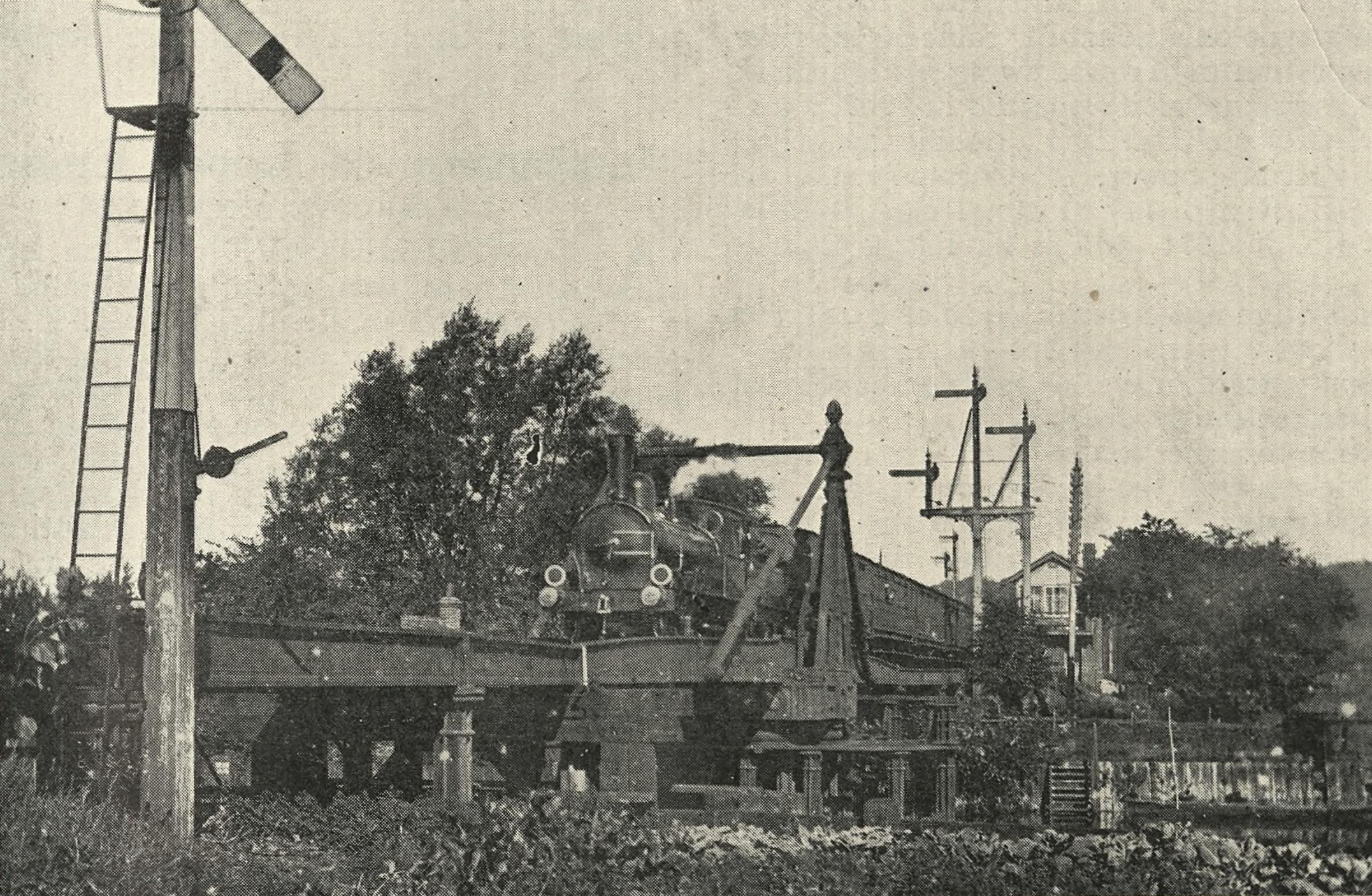
A train crossing the original bridge in 1902

The current bridge was built in 1987, and is single track and electrified. It was designed by British Rail Eastern Region, based in York. The main contractor was May Gurney of Norwich and they were also the civil works contractor. The Butterley Engineering Company were the fabricators, mechanical contractor and electrical contractor. The bridge was fabricated and fully trial erected, including a slewing motion trial, inside the Butterley Engineering Company's workshops known as "The Bridge Yard" at Butterley Hill, Ripley in Derbyshire during 1986 and was delivered to site and installed during the winter months of November 1986 to January 1987. The old twin-track centre-slew bridge remained in service during the installation and trials of the new bridge until the date the live rail was diverted over the new bridge. The closure and removal of the old bridge at the end of February 1987 was during the river's closure to navigation for the bridge replacement, provided for under a specific Act of Parliament.

== Current structure ==
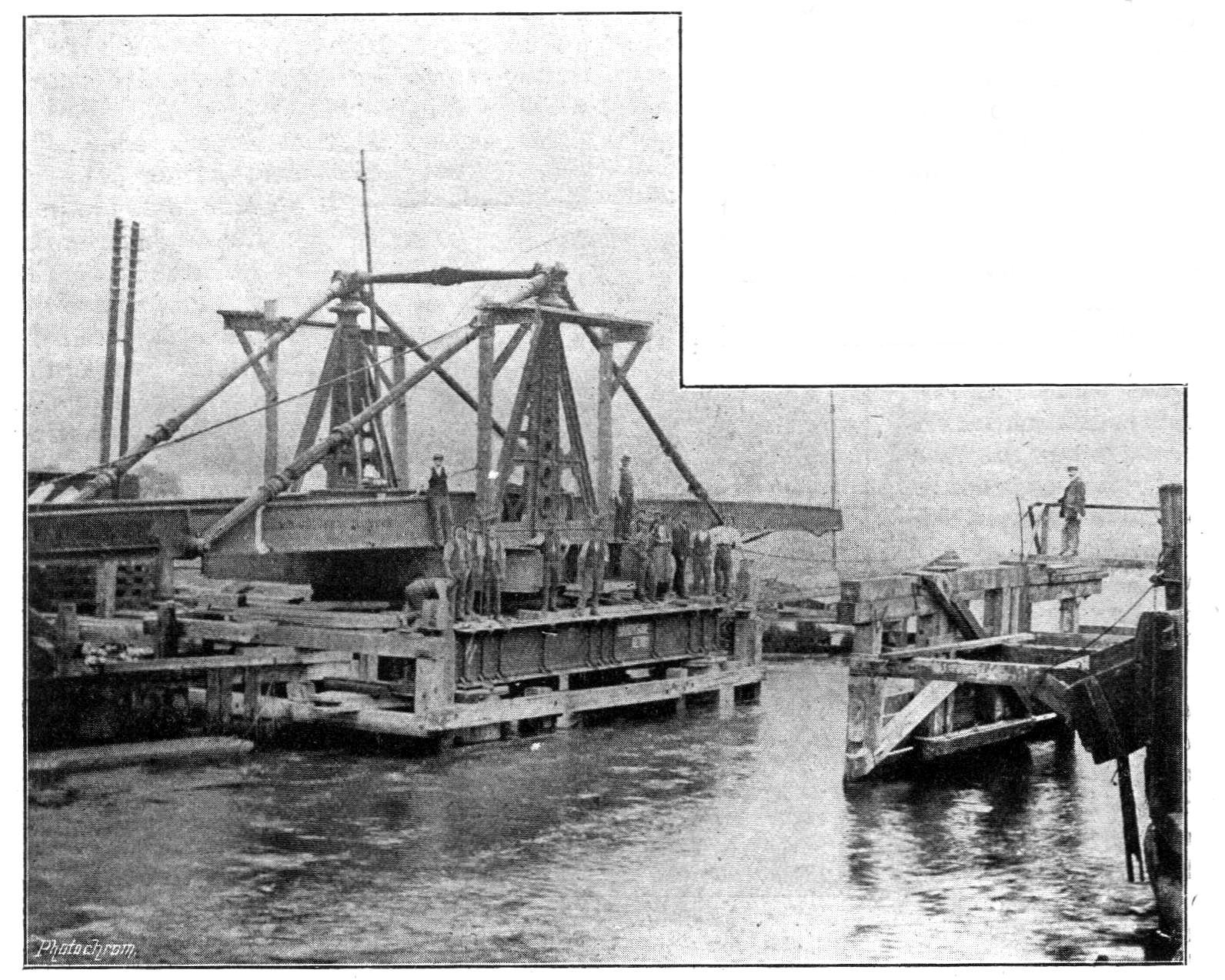
The 1845 bridge, during removal

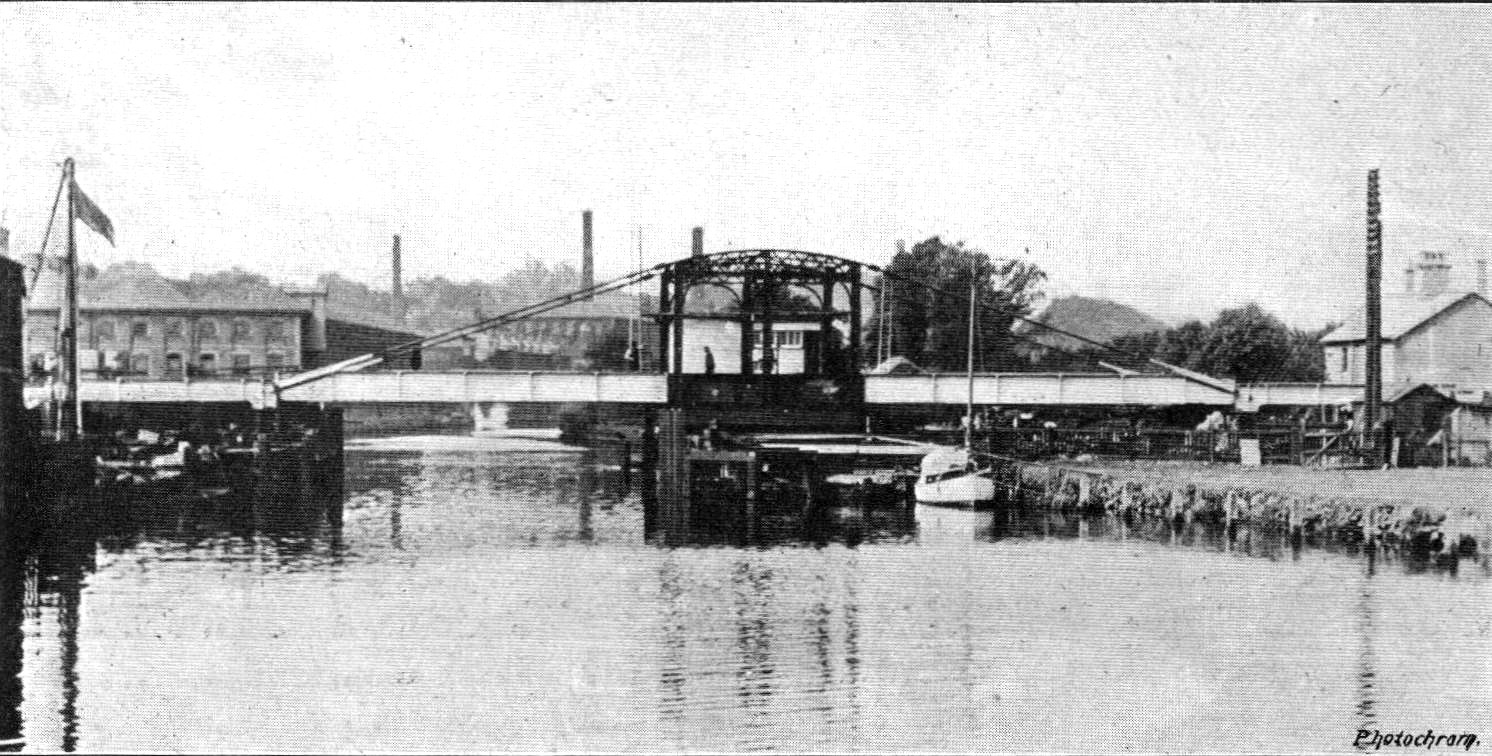
The 1905 bridge, newly installed

The swing bridge section is approximately 26 metres (85 ft) long, with an off-centre slewing bearing and an underslung counterweight box. The total slew bridge weight was 354 long tons (360 tonnes; 396 short tons), including the counterweight. The counterweight was made from almost 90 long tons (91 t; 100 short tons) of cut up railway track used to precisely balance the structure during the commissioning works. It was necessary for the swing bridge to be balanced about the centre of slew to give equal loading of the 4 main lifting jacks and the span was accurately weighed by 4 x 100 long tons (100 t; 110 short tons) electronic load cells (certified to ±0.5%) February 1987, during the bridge's final installation and commissioning trials.

There are three fixed approach spans at the Norwich city end and the main swing bridge section. The swing bridge raises some 300 millimetres (12 in) on 4 main jacks, mounted on to substantial sub-frame in the turning pit. The swing bridge raises to clear the fixed span and land abutment's scarfed rail joints and to also clear the fixed overhead conductor rails, which are gantry mounted to the swing bridge and the approach spans. The bridge "slew" is provided by 2 hydraulic motors driving against the main slewing ring bearing, manufactured by Robello. The swing bridge section is constructed to be a flat span in the open to rail/service position and not cambered, as are many other bridges. The bridge has frequently caused problems with navigation on the river due to its unreliability, leaving it unable to open.

It is notable for being the only swing bridge in the United Kingdom to carry an overhead electrified railway track (25 kV 50 Hz). Other examples can be found along the Northeast Corridor in the United States; see for instance Portal Bridge and the Galata Bridge over the Golden Horn in Istanbul. The power supply to trains is provided by an overhead conductor rail instead of a wire and there are short lengths of overhead conductor rail either side of the bridge on the fixed approaches. There is a 40 mph (64 km/h) speed limit over the bridge in both directions as trains are about to arrive at, or have just departed from, Norwich station.

The bridge is also the home of Trowse signal box, which controls most of the Bittern Line from Whitlingham Junction to Sheringham. The line was resignalled in 2000, leading to the closure of a number of mechanical signal boxes with control moving to Trowse. The resignalling saw the end of one of the few remaining sections of single track main line controlled by tokens.
