= Norfolk Railway =

Railway company in Norfolk, England operating from 1845 to 1862

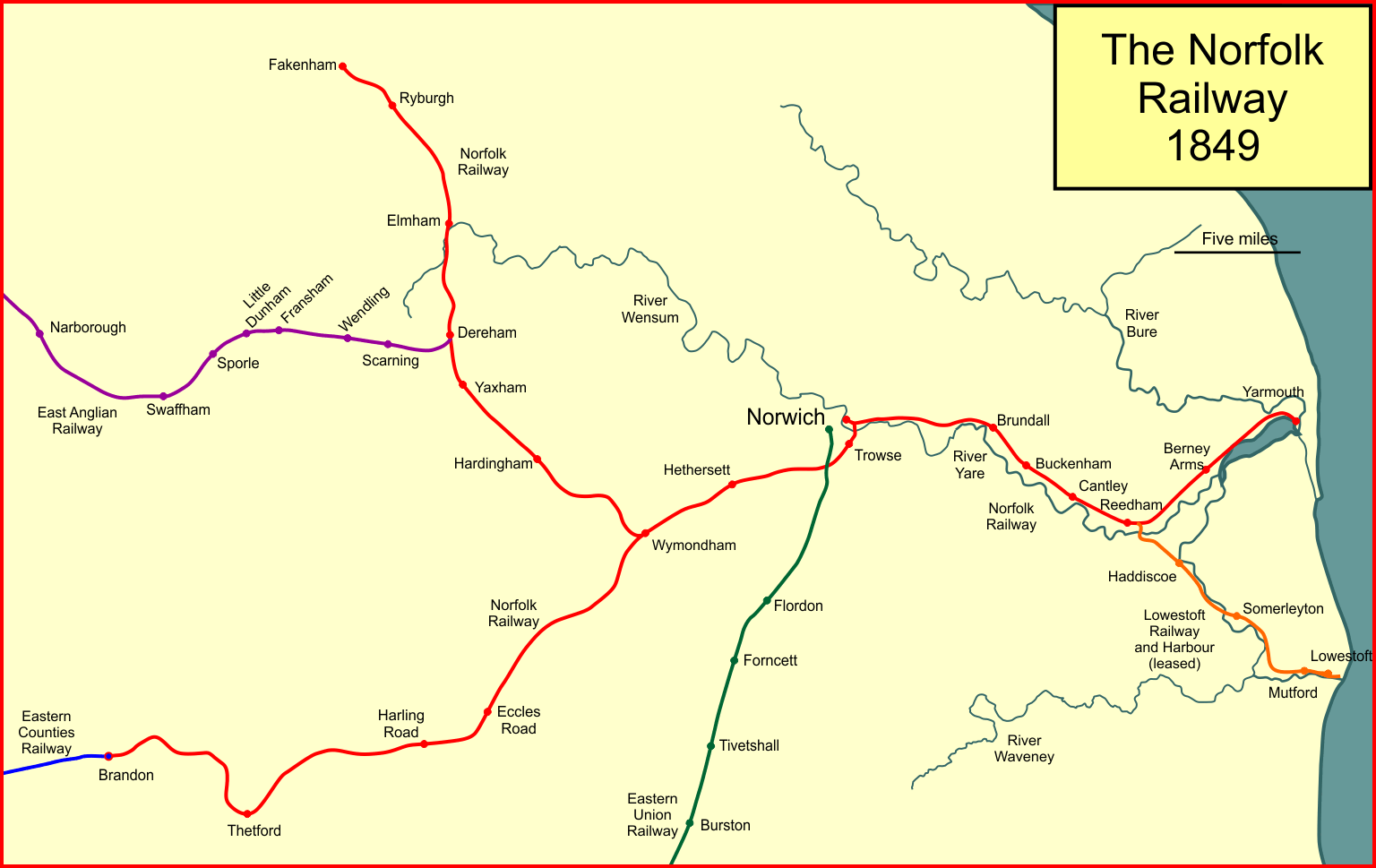

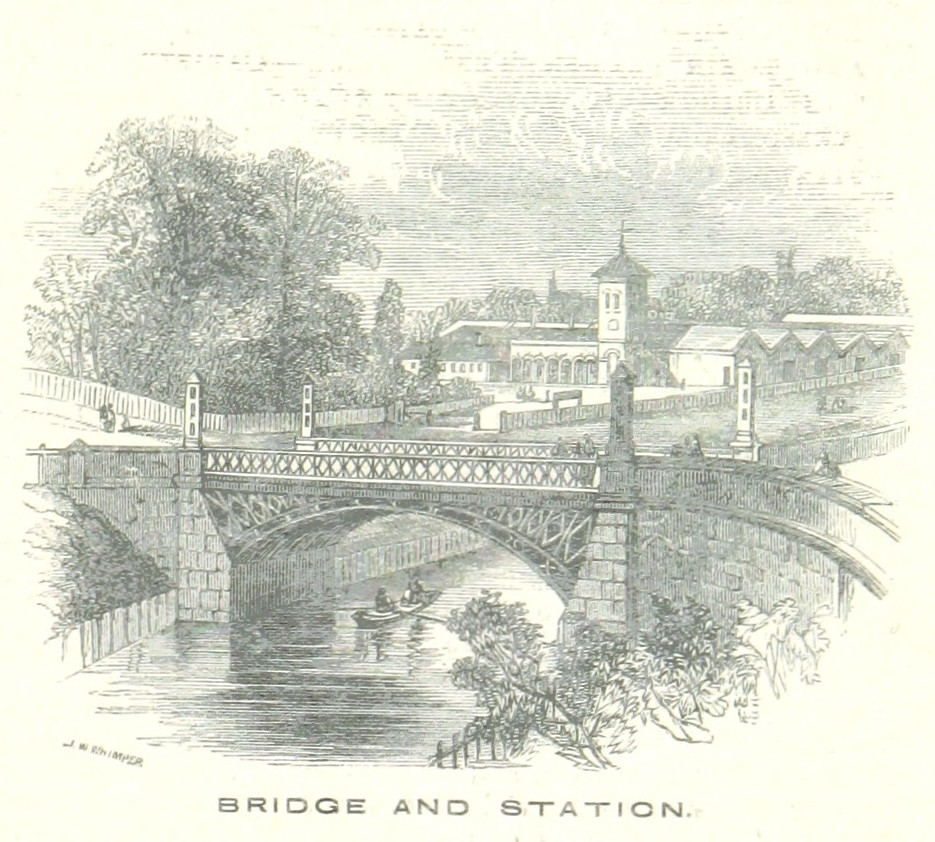
- Norwich station in 1851

Overview
- Dates of operation: 1845–1862
- Predecessor: Yarmouth and Norwich Railway; Norwich and Brandon Railway
- Successor: Great Eastern Railway

Technical
- Track gauge: 4 ft 8 1/2 in (1,435 mm) standard gauge
- Length: 58 miles (93 km)

The Norfolk Railway was an early railway company that controlled a network of 94 miles around Norwich, England. It was formed in 1845 by the amalgamation of the Yarmouth and Norwich Railway opened in 1844, and the Norwich and Brandon Railway, not yet opened. These lines were built out of frustration that the Eastern Counties Railway line that was expected to connect Norwich to London failed to be completed. The Norfolk Railway also leased the Lowestoft Railway and Harbour Company, and built a branch to Dereham and Fakenham, opened in 1846 and 1849 respectively.

It was successful in connecting Norwich to the emerging railway network, by connecting at Brandon with a line from London via Cambridge and also a line from the Midlands through Peterborough. However as a local line it was dependent on bigger partners, and it was threatened by new competing lines, so that its independence was always at risk. In 1848 it agreed with the larger Eastern Counties Railway (ECR) that the ECR would operate its line, reducing the Norfolk Railway to a financial company only. In 1862 the Norfolk Railway amalgamated with other companies to form the Great Eastern Railway.

Its first lines, from Great Yarmouth to Norwich and Norwich to Brandon, continue in use at the present day as important regional routes, and although the Dereham and Fakenham branch closed to passengers in the 1960s, the majority of this line remains open as the Mid-Norfolk Railway.

== Yarmouth and Norwich Railway ==
The merchants of Norwich had been gratified when the Eastern Counties Railway got its authorising act of Parliament, the Eastern Counties Railway Act 1836 (6 & 7 Will. 4. c. cvi), to build a line from London to their city and on to Great Yarmouth. The capital for the construction was £1.6 million, a huge amount at the time. The Eastern Counties Railway had grossly underestimated the cost of building its line, and it was running out of money. The people of Norwich were dismayed in April 1839, when the ECR announced that it would be unable to build any further than Colchester for the time being.

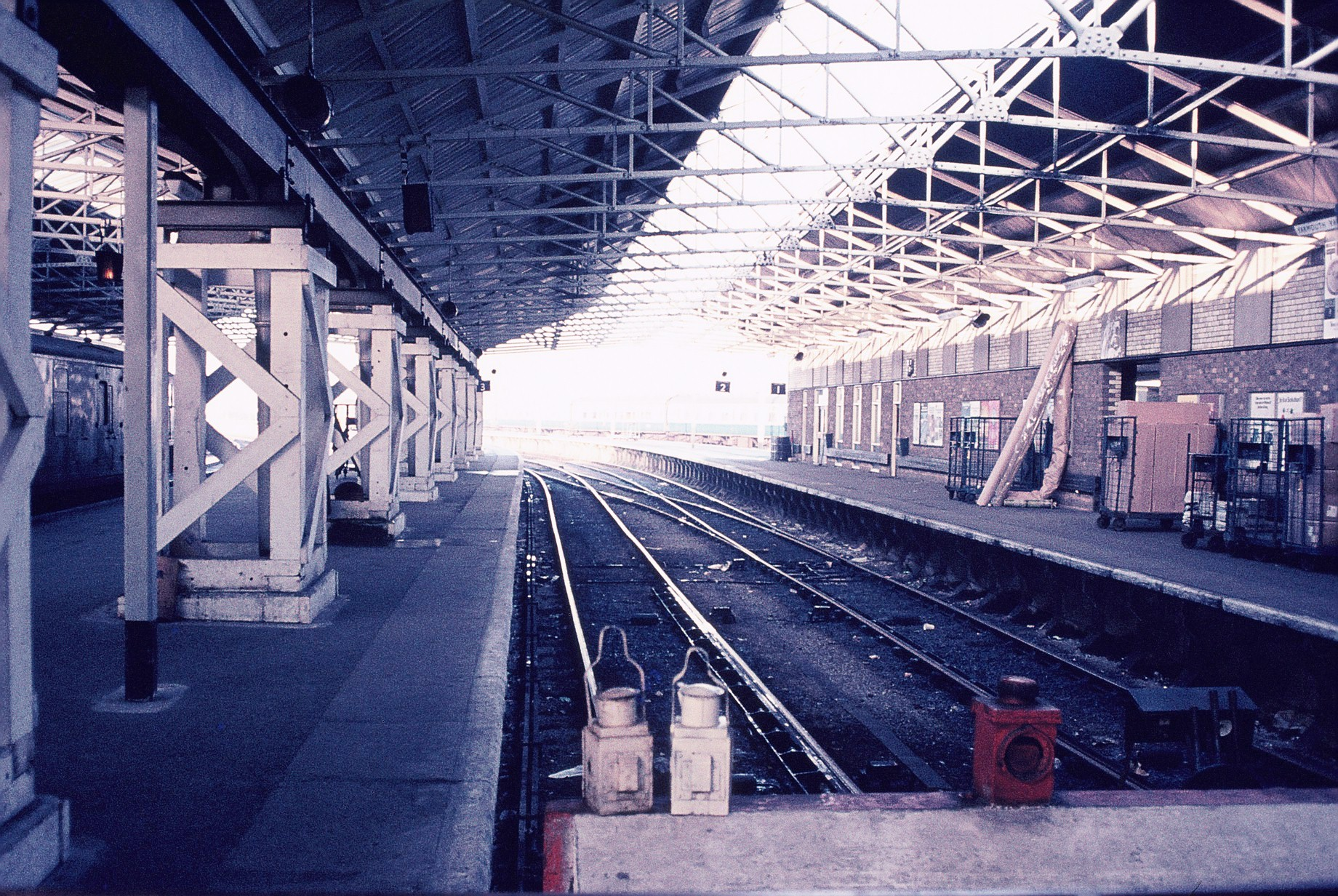
Yarmouth railway station in the 1980s

Throughout the remainder of that year and in 1840, a number of schemes were put forward and discussed; there were alternative routes, but they all met with the suspicion that large sums of money might be subscribed without the lines being completed. By now the Northern and Eastern Railway was in financial difficulty too; its original intention of connecting London to York was eventually reduced to a line from Stratford to Newport, Essex. Ambitious railway schemes in East Anglia were not held in high esteem, especially when their projected cost was quoted in millions of pounds.

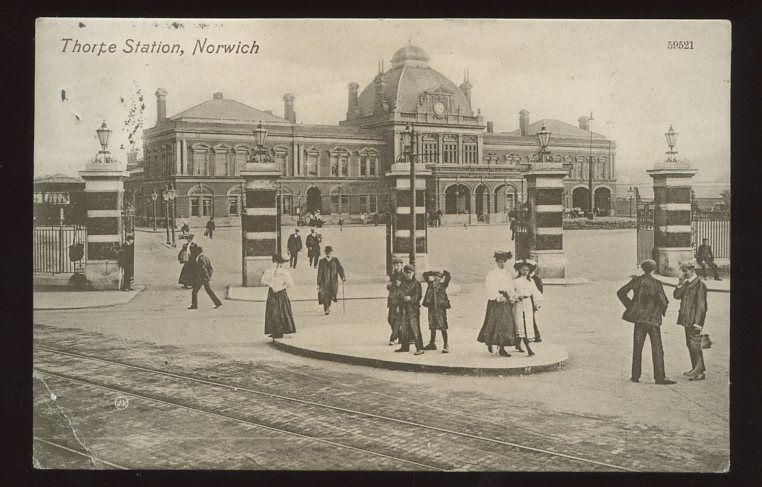
Norwich Thorpe station in 1911

On 21 January 1841, a meeting was held in Norwich to determine how to improve the transport links of Norwich. As a first step, a link to Yarmouth was planned. Yarmouth was the port for the City of Norwich, and at the same time a fashionable watering place, and would be useful, as coastwise shipping was an important transport medium for heavy materials, particularly coal, and the railway would enable minerals to be brought to Norwich from the harbour at Yarmouth. The ECR powers to build between Norwich and Yarmouth had lapsed by this time, but at a meeting on 19 March 1841 a proposal was tabled, prepared by Robert Stephenson, for a line. It was to be routed indirectly, via Reedham, to minimise the cost by avoiding certain river crossings and keeping to low-lying ground: it became known as the Valley Line. It would cost a little under £200,000 including land acquisition and rolling stock.

The project went to the 1842 session of Parliament, and in the face of Eastern Counties Railway opposition, the Yarmouth and Norwich Railway Act 1842 (5 & 6 Vict. c. lxxxii) passed on 18 June 1842. George Stephenson was the chairman of the company and Robert Stephenson the engineer. Share capital was £150,000.

Grissell and Peto were appointed as the contractors; they had agreed to take £30,000 of their fee in shares; they started work in late March 1843. There proved to be a difficulty over the Yarmouth terminus, which was planned to be on an island owned by Robert Cory. The only access was over a primitive and narrow suspension toll bridge, and there were covenants preventing anyone from building a further access bridge. The issue was not resolved by the time the line opened, and at first arriving passengers were ferried across the River Bure. Cory objected to that, stating that he had the monopoly on ferry crossings as well, and the matter went to court.

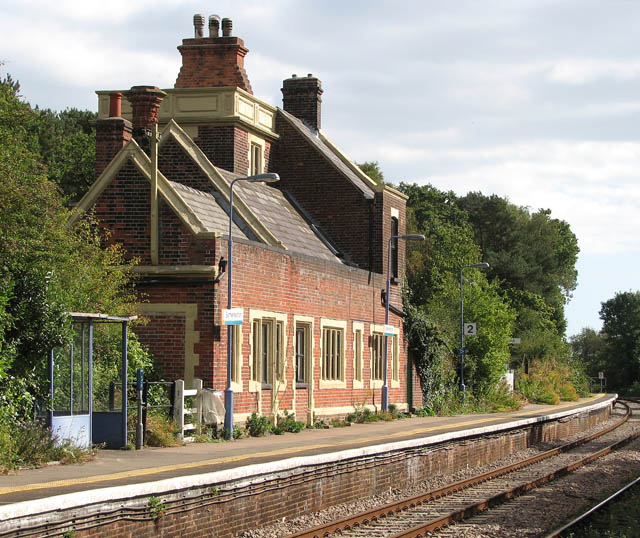
Somerleyton station

On 12 April 1844 the line was nearly complete and a special train was run over the line, conveying, among others, General Pasley of the Board of Trade. There was a ceremonial opening on 30 April 1844, followed by the full public opening on 1 May 1844. There were seven passenger trains each way daily, four of which were non-stop trains completing the journey in 45 minutes; there were five intermediate stations. The Yarmouth terminus later became known as Yarmouth Vauxhall. For some time at the beginning, there were no goods or mineral trains; in fact this service was delayed until the Brandon connection was finished. The company contracted out the operation of its trains to George Merrett, Peto's agent during the construction, for £7,000 a year.

The Yarmouth and Norwich Railway was the first in the country to adopt electric telegraph block working from its beginning. Neele described the signalling arrangements:

The stations intermediate between Reedham and Norwich were very primitive and small; the mode of signalling as simple as could well be devised. A lofty pole at the station platform was furnished with a circular creel or basket, painted red. If this was pulled to the top of the pole, the train was to stop. Semaphores and distant signals were unknown on the Line, but while this was the case with signals, the telegraphing of train progress was in advance of any system in vogue at that time on any other line, or indeed at the present day, for standing in the foreman's office at Norwich, it was easy to observe the signals which indicated, by large deflected needles, the passage of the going or coming train at Norwich, Brandon Junction, Brundall, Reedham. and Yarmouth, respectively.

Carter states that "the Yarmouth and Norwich for many years held the railway 'sprint' record of one mile in 44 seconds."

== Norwich and Brandon Railway ==
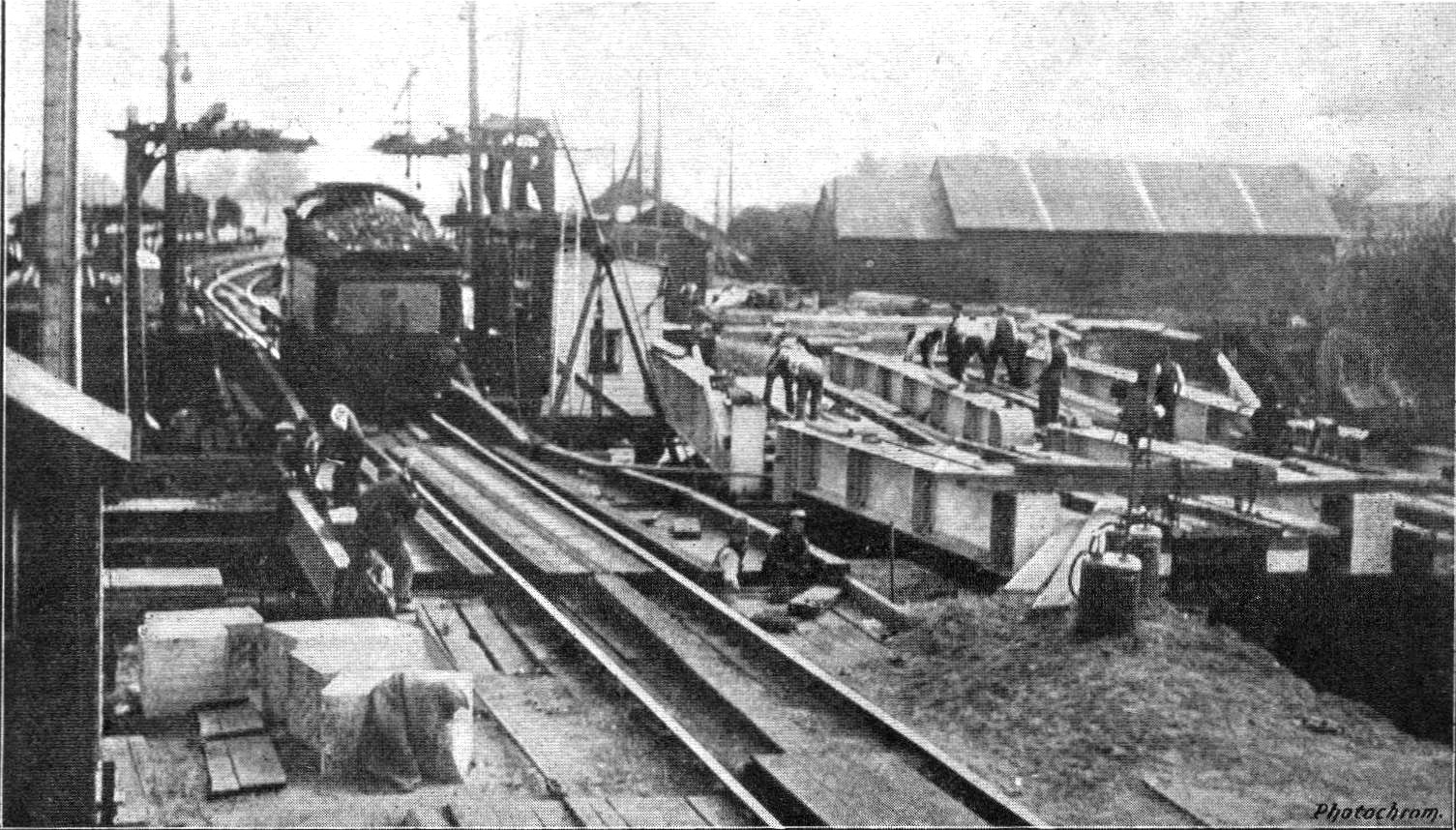
Trowse old swing bridge during removal)

Authorisation of the Yarmouth and Norwich Railway had gone through smoothly, and thoughts in Norwich turned to connecting the city to the emerging railway network. Much of the September 1843 shareholders' meeting of the Yarmouth and Norwich company was taken up with discussion of possible extensions. Samuel Morton Peto said that if they built a line to Brandon, 40 miles to the west, then the existing railways would compete to join it at Brandon, so completing a through connection to the other lines. The choice of Brandon must have been the result of private negotiations with some or all of the other railways that might join up there. (Note: Brandon is also just across the border from Norfolk into Suffolk.)

In September 1843 a notice appeared in the press making this objective plain:

Norwich and Brandon Railway: A prospectus has this week been issued for the formation of a railway, in extension of the Yarmouth and Norwich Railway, commencing near the terminus in this city [Norwich], and running to Brandon, a distance of thirty miles... from Brandon, the country is... favourable for the construction of lines to communicate with the branch of the London and Birmingham Railway at Peterborough, with the Eastern Counties railway at Colchester, and with the Northern and Eastern railway at Newport, the distance in each case being the same, viz., about 40 miles. By the construction of this railway, it is anticipated, Norwich, Yarmouth, and the county of Norfolk, will be ultimately connected, not only with the metropolis but with the Midland and Northern counties, and the manufacturing districts, as, no doubt, extension lines, to connect it with the above-mentioned railways, would speedily be obtained by the respective companies, who have already expressed their desire to co-operate with the promoters of the undertaking; and, with that object, some of them are now actually employed in making surveys.

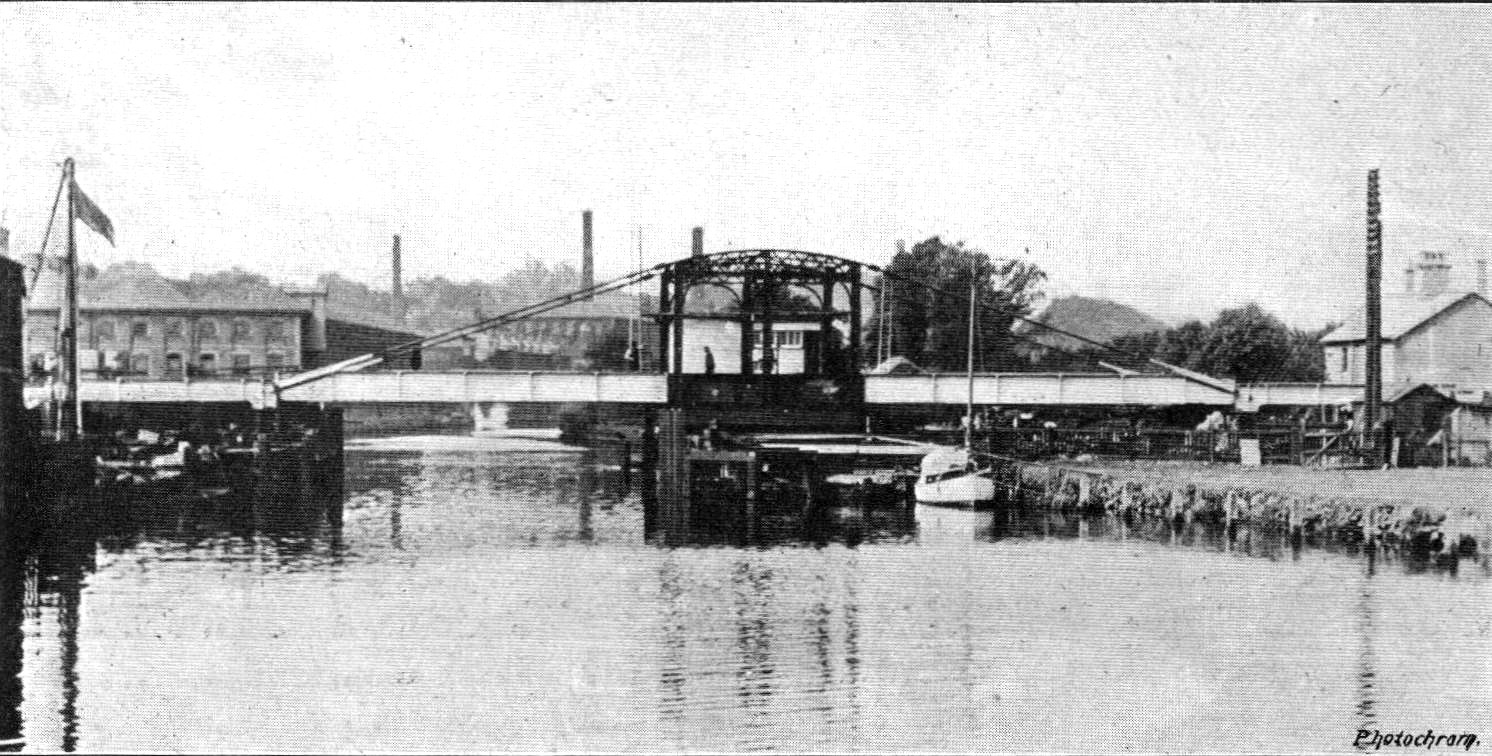
Trowse swing bridge, 1905)

An 8% return would, it was claimed, be achieved on the present volume of traffic, but a "great increase of income" would be secured "on the ultimate completion of a line to Peterborough, or to Colchester, or Newport" by attracting traffic from coastal shipping. The capital to be raised was £300,000.

The London and Birmingham Railway was not induced to extend its Peterborough branch to Brandon, and the Eastern Counties Railway had stalled at Colchester. Nevertheless the Northern and Eastern Railway had got as far as Bishops Stortford and an extension of that to Brandon by way of Cambridge and Ely was feasible. Accordingly the Norwich and Brandon Railway went ahead and it secured the Norwich and Brandon Railway Act 1844 (7 & 8 Vict. c. xv) on 10 May 1844.

== Eastern Counties Railway to Brandon ==
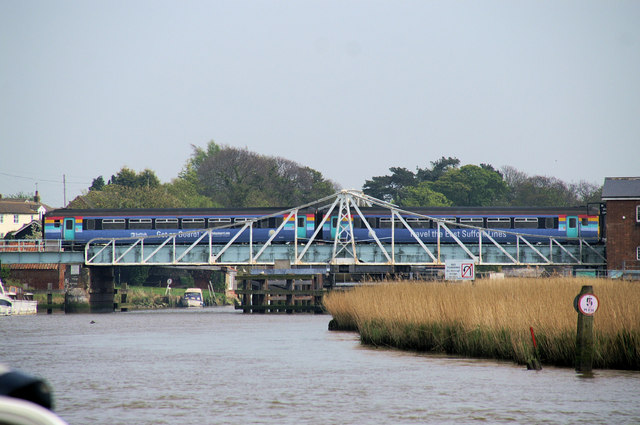
A train crossing Reedham swing Bridge

The Eastern Counties Railway had been authorised on 4 July 1836 to construct a railway from London to Great Yarmouth by way of Ipswich and Norwich. At the time of authorisation this was a huge scheme: 126 miles of railway at a cost of £1.6 million, and it turned out that the project was considerably underestimated. The ECR only reached Colchester, and ran out of money, and for the time being the project finished there.

The Northern and Eastern Railway had built a line from London to Bishop's Stortford, using the ECR London terminus. It had originally intended to build a line from London to York by way of Cambridge, but that too proved to be unachievable, and its authorised route was cut back to reaching from London to Newport, Essex. The ECR worked the trains on the N&ER, which was also seriously short of money. On 1 January 1844 the Eastern Counties Railway secured a 999-year lease of the N&ER. The N&ER had only reached Bishop's Stortford, but at the time of the lease it was in the course of constructing on to its authorised northern extremity at Newport, a distance of about 9 miles.

When the Norwich and Brandon Railway was being promoted, the ECR saw that a continuation from Newport to Brandon would not only include the important regional centre of Cambridge, but give it a through route to Norwich via Ely. This was a more attractive proposition than trying to revive the Colchester to Norwich route, so the ECR went to Parliament for the necessary powers to build to Brandon, to meet the Norwich and Brandon Railway there; the Eastern Counties Railway Company (Ely, Brandon and Peterborough Extension) Act 1844 (7 & 8 Vict. c. lxii) authorising the project was given royal assent on 4 July 1844. (Note: Gordon, page 105; Allen says 4 June 1844, page 13.)

== Cory's bridge at Yarmouth ==
The Yarmouth suspension bridge owned by Cory was the only fixed access from the railway station to the town, crossing the Bure, and the railway company had been unable to secure powers to by-pass it. On 2 May 1845 the bridge collapsed under a crowd of people, and more than a hundred drowned:

The scene of this dreadful event was the Suspension-bridge, on the North Quay, crossing the river Bure, and which has been the entrance to the town from the railway and the new road from Acle. Cooke's Equestrian Company has for some time been staying in the town, and on the morning of this fatal day it was announced by public handbills that Nelson, one of the clowns, would sail up the River Bure... in a common washing tub, drawn by four "real geese," elegantly harnessed and caparisoned... The clown and his geese started from the Old Bridge in the presence of an immense concourse of persons, who had assembled on the banks of the river to witness the feat. On his arrival at the mouth of the Bure, a current took him towards Braydon whence he was obliged to be towed back to the union of the two streams. The multitude of persons along the North Quay was greatly increased by the rush from the Old Bridge, and every spot where a view of Nelson and his geese could be obtained, was filled with spectators. By far the most advantageous view was had from the Suspension-bridge, and... about four hundred persons occupied this position... every point of vision towards the spot where the geese were to be looked for was densely crammed with men, women, and children, and even the chains and suspenders had many occupants. This is the bridge which has been the cause of so much litigation between the Yarmouth Railway Company and Mr. Cory, its proprietor and which has, since the arrangement with the parties, become the principal, if not the only medium of transit to and from the railway terminus. In order to accommodate this increased traffic, the proprietors had been induced to extend the bridge on each side of the chains, to the extent of four feet, for foot passengers, and the platform on the south side was the chief receptacle for the multitude who were on the bridge on this occasion... all eyes were stretched to the utmost and every ear listening with eagerness for the first announcement of the clown's appearance. This anxiety was brought to its highest pitch by the cry of "Here come the geese." The shout resounded from side to side; but amidst was a shriek from the shores; the bridge was observed to give way; it lowered on one side; the chains snapped asunder, one after another in momentary succession, and almost before the gaze of the thronging multitude could be drawn from its object of worthless interest it was riveted to the half sunken bridge--suspended on one side by its unbroken chains—-cleared of all its occupants—-every one of whom were plunged into the stream, and over them the waters were flowing as if unconscious of the fearful tragedy which had momentarily occurred.

In February 1847 the board agreed to pay Cory £26,000 to buy him out. A railway-owned bridge was to be provided as well as a replacement for his own bridge, and tolls would be charged to persons taking the Acle Road and not proceeding to or from the railway station.

== Formation of the Norfolk Railway ==
Norfolk Railway Act 1845
- Act of Parliament
- Parliament of the United Kingdom
- Long title: An Act for the Consolidation of the Yarmouth and Norwich and Norwich and Brandon Railway Companies, and for authorizing the Construction of certain Works at Norwich in connexion with the Yarmouth and Norwich Railway.
- Citation: 8 & 9 Vict. c. xli

Dates
- Royal assent: 30 June 1845

Other legislation
- Repealed by: Great Eastern Railway Act 1862

Status: Repealed

The directors of the Norwich and Brandon Railway and those of the Yarmouth and Norwich Railway saw that their companies had shared interests, and an amalgamation was proposed. This was agreed to, and a combined company, known as the Norfolk Railway was incorporated by the Norfolk Railway Act 1845 (8 & 9 Vict. c. xli) on 30 June 1845. The Norfolk Railway had a route mileage of 58.

== Opening from Bishop's Stortford to Norwich ==
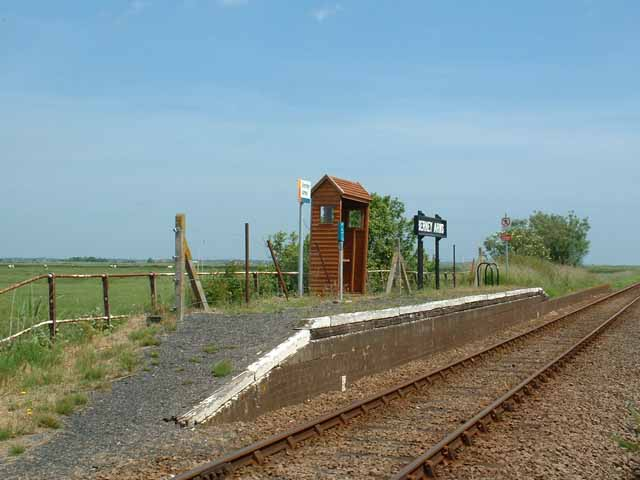
Berney Arms station

The line from Bishop's Stortford to Norwich was opened ceremonially on 29 July 1845. It consisted of the final section of the N&ER between Bishop's Stortford and Newport (constructed by the N&ER but immediately adopted by the ECR), the ECR from Newport to Brandon, and the Norfolk Railway from Brandon to Trowse, all opened on the same day. Ordinary public traffic over the route began on 30 July 1845. The Trowse station was just outside Norwich: the final entry to the city was delayed while a swing bridge over the River Wensum at Carrow was completed. (Note: The Carrow swing bridge is nowadays generally referred to as Trowse Swing Bridge.) Thus the first railway communication between London (Shoreditch) and Norwich (Trowse) had been brought to completion, though by way of Cambridge, and not the Colchester route for which the Eastern Counties had obtained its original powers in 1836.

For eight months from the opening, the Norfolk Railway worked the train service to and from Ely, as the Eastern Counties Railway was unable, as yet, to service this section. The company found itself short of locomotives to work its network, and twenty additional engines were ordered.

The Carrow (or Trowse) swing bridge was later completed on 15 December 1845 and the line fully opened into Thorpe Junction, where it met the Yarmouth and Norwich line and gained access to the Norwich station (named Norwich Thorpe from the date of the opening of Victoria station on 12 December 1849). The swing bridge was over a hundred feet long, with two equal opening spans of 44 feet, although only one was navigable. The best time for the journey from Norwich to London was four hours.

The Norwich and Brandon Railway originally intended to serve Thetford by a branch, but during construction it became obvious that Thetford ought to be on the main line and the line of route was modified. In doing so, it took a marked southward sweep to run through the town.

== Lowestoft Railway and Harbour ==
Samuel Morton Peto purchased the Somerleyton Estate, near Lowestoft, in 1844 and on 28 September 1844 he promoted a public meeting at which he urged the construction of a railway from Lowestoft to Reedham, where it would have a triangular junction to join the Yarmouth and Norwich line. The harbour at Lowestoft, much used for its fishing fleet, was falling into disrepair, and something would need to be done to improve that too. The meeting agreed that a railway would be a good thing, and a bill for the line was deposited for the 1845 session of Parliament. Peto personally acquired the harbour at Lowestoft.

Lowestoft Railway and Harbour Act 1845
- Act of Parliament
- Parliament of the United Kingdom
- Long title: An Act for making a Railway from Lowestoft in the County of Suffolk to the Yarmouth and Norwich Railway at Reedham in the County of Norfolk, and for improving the Harbour of Lowestoft.
- Citation: 8 & 9 Vict. c. xlv

Dates
- Royal assent: 30 June 1845

Lowestoft Railway Alteration Act 1847
- Act of Parliament
- Parliament of the United Kingdom
- Long title: An Act to authorize an Alteration in the Line of the Lowestoft Railway, and to amend the Act relating to the Lowestoft Railway and Harbour Company.
- Citation: 10 & 11 Vict. c. xcviii

Dates
- Royal assent: 2 July 1847

Text of statute as originally enacted

Opposition from Yarmouth was confined to technical and drainage issues, and the Lowestoft Railway and Harbour Act 1845 (8 & 9 Vict. c. xlv) was passed on 30 June 1845; share capital was to be £120,000, of which £80,000 was for building an eleven mile railway and £40,000 was for harbour improvements at Lowestoft itself. Two swing bridges would be required on the line. The cost of completing the harbour works alone was later estimated at £174,516.

The line opened on 3 May 1847 to goods and 1 July 1847 to passenger traffic. However before this opening, the company's line was leased by the Norfolk Railway, in 1846. The lease gave the Norfolk Railway control of the Lowestoft company in perpetuity, for 4% on the Lowestoft capital of £120,000, dividing any additional profit between them.

== Dereham and Fakenham branch ==
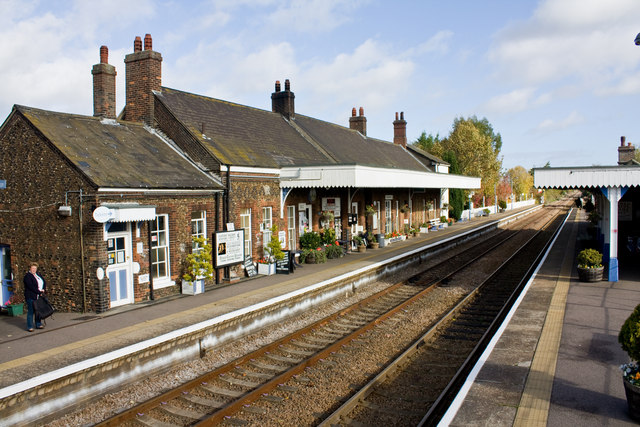
Wymondham station

During 1845 a furious and controversial series of discussions took place in Norwich about a railway to Dereham and Fakenham, and the route it should take. A branch from Wymondham to Dereham was already authorised, and after considerable argument, it was proceeded with. It opened from Wymondham to Dereham on 7 December 1846 for goods trains and on 15 February 1847 for passengers. The powers naturally passed to the Norfolk Railway. The following year, during construction, the Norfolk Railway sought an act of Parliament to extend the Dereham line to Wells and Blakeney; this was granted by the Norfolk Railway Extensions (Dereham, Wells and Blakeney Branch) Act 1846 (9 & 10 Vict. c. clxix).

The Wells and Blakeney extensions were not built, and the new work was confined to building to Fakenham only. The construction contract was let to Peto in the Spring of 1847.

== Norfolk Railway worked by the Eastern Counties Railway ==
When the Eastern Counties Railway failed to construct on from Colchester to Norwich, a new company stepped in, named the Eastern Union Railway. Together with an allied company, the Ipswich and Bury Railway, it completed the line from Colchester through Ipswich to its own terminus at Norwich; the through route was opened to traffic in 1849. During 1846 and 1847, the EUR negotiated to acquire the Norfolk Railway, but the two companies were unable to agree terms. The Eastern Counties Railway now engaged in talks and was more successful. Agreement for acquisition of the Norfolk Railway was finalised on 2 May 1848, and the ECR took over the entire Norfolk Railway system, rolling stock included, on 8 May 1848. It sacked the Norfolk Railway staff and substituted its own. Gordon says that the ECR "took the Norfolk on lease, so saving it from financial 'perdition'".

This required the approval of Parliament, and the companies had agreed that if Parliament refused to sanction the takeover, then in May 1855, the Norfolk Railway should have the option of repurchasing its rolling stock at the same price as the ECR paid in 1848; in the meantime the stock should be properly maintained. In 1849 Parliament ratified the working arrangement, but refused the amalgamation, so that the ECR was working the line only; it did however purchase the rolling stock, a process that was completed by mid-summer 1850. The Norfolk Railway system consisted of 94 miles of railway; it had 40 locomotives, and it had cost £2.3 million.

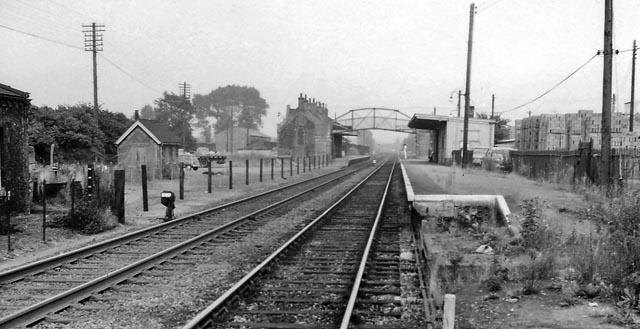
Brandon station

Accordingly from May 1848 the Norfolk Railway ceased to operate trains on its lines, which became simply branches of the Eastern Counties Railway. However an amalgamation bill failed in Parliament in the 1849 session. Although the Norfolk Railway now had only financial matters to concern it, these proved extremely troublesome due to haphazard financial control and accounting during its active lifetime.

== Formation of the Great Eastern Railway ==
The Eastern Counties Railway now operated the Norfolk Railway, which reduced NR activity to simply being an owner of the line but not having any hand in its operation. The ECR gained similar control of other railways in East Anglia, and at length amalgamation was proposed. In 1862 the ECR, the Norfolk Railway, the Eastern Union Railway and the East Anglian Railways amalgamated, forming a new company, the Great Eastern Railway. This was ratified by the Great Eastern Railway Act 1862 (25 & 26 Vict. c. ccxxiii) of 7 August 1862, retrospectively effective from 1 July 1862.

The GER owned two main lines between London and Norwich, and the Norwich to Yarmouth and Norwich to Lowestoft lines of the Norfolk Railway became branch lines of the GER; the same was true of the Dereham branch.

== Other developments ==
The Acle line, forming a slightly shorter route between Yarmouth and Norwich, opened in 1883.

In association with the Midland and Great Northern Joint Railway, the GER built the Norfolk and Suffolk Joint Railway between Lowestoft and Yarmouth. This formed a much shorter route, opening in 1903, but the line failed to develop as had been hoped. It closed in 1970.

== Grouping and nationalisation ==
In 1923 the Great Eastern Railway was made a constituent of a new company, the London and North Eastern Railway, as part of a process determined by the Railways Act 1921, commonly referred to as "the grouping of the railways". In 1948 the LNER and other companies were taken into national ownership as part of British Railways.

Most of the network of the Norfolk Railway continues in use; the Brandon to Norwich line lost much of the London traffic, which was later concentrated on the Ipswich route. However it gained from a much more frequent cross-country passenger service from Liverpool via Ely and Thetford, typically at hourly intervals. The original Yarmouth and Norwich line was partly by-passed by a shorter route by way of Acle; its extremities still operate a good local passenger service and the original Reedham route from Yarmouth carries only a minimal train service. However the Lowestoft to Norwich trains run through Reedham. These train services are branded the Wherry Lines for marketing purposes. There is very limited freight activity on these routes.

The Fakenham to Dereham route section closed to passenger traffic on 5 October 1964. From Dereham to Wymondham followed, closing in October 1969, although the line remained open for goods traffic until the 1980s. The section from Wymondham to North Elmham was retained as a dormant railway for some years, leading to its survival as the Mid-Norfolk Railway. This company aspires to restore the line as far as Fakenham, and owns the route to a point just beyond County School. A section of the route into Fakenham is owned by the Norfolk Orbital Railway.

== Topography ==
Location list during the lifetime of the railway; station names in bold are still open.

=== Yarmouth and Norwich Railway ===
- North Quay
- **Yarmouth; opened 1 May 1844; often known as Yarmouth Vauxhall; now as Great Yarmouth**
- Berney Arms; opened 1 May 1844
- Reedham; opened 1 May 1844; relocated 1 June 1904
- Cantley; opened 1 May 1844
- Buckenham; opened 1 May 1844
- Brundall; opened 1 May 1844
- Brundall Gardens; opened 1 August 1924
- Surlingham Ferry; uncertain whether this station actually opened in 1844; short lived
- Thorpe; dates unknown
- Whitlingham; opened 20 October 1847; closed 19 September 1955
- **Norwich; opened 1 May 1844; probably renamed Norwich Thorpe 1849; relocated 3 May 1886.**

=== Norwich and Brandon Railway ===
- **Norwich;**
- Trowse; temporary terminus opened 30 July 1845; new station on extension of line to Norwich 15 December 1845; closed 22 May 1916; reopened 1 April 1919; closed 5 September 1939;
- Hethersett; opened 30 July 1845; closed 31 January 1966
- **Wymondham; opened 30 July 1845**
- **Spooner Row**; opened 30 July 1845
- **Attleborough**; opened 30 July 1845
- **Eccles Road**; opened 30 July 1845; shown as Eccles in timetables 1847 to 1849
- **Harling Road**; opened 30 July 1845
- Roudham Junction; opened 18 October 1869; closed 1 May 1932; unadvertised use continued until 15 June 1964
- **Thetford; opened 30 July 1845**
- **Brandon**; opened 30 July 1845

=== Dereham and Fakenham branch ===
- Fakenham; opened 20 March 1849; renamed Fakenham East 27 September 1948; closed 5 October 1964
- Ryburgh; opened 20 March 1849; closed 5 October 1964
- County School; opened March 1884; closed 5 October 1964; now part of the Mid-Norfolk Railway
- Elmham; opened 20 March 1849; renamed North Elmham 1872; closed 5 October 1964; now part of the Mid-Norfolk Railway
- Dereham; opened 15 February 1847; closed 6 October 1969; now part of the Mid-Norfolk Railway
- Yaxham; opened 15 February 1847; closed 6 October 1969; now part of the Mid-Norfolk Railway
- Thuxton; opened September 1851; closed 6 October 1969; now part of the Mid-Norfolk Railway
- Hardingham; opened 15 February 1847; closed 6 October 1969; now part of the Mid-Norfolk Railway
- Kimberley; opened 12 December 1848; renamed Kimberley Park 1923; closed 6 October 1969; now part of the Mid-Norfolk Railway
- Wymondham

=== Lowestoft Railway and Harbour ===
- **Reedham**
- Haddiscoe; opened 1 July 1847; closed 9 May 1904
- **Haddiscoe Junction; convergence of line from Yarmouth**
- Haddiscoe Low Level; opened 9 May 1904; renamed Haddiscoe 1959
- St Olaves Junction; opened 1 June 1859, exchange station only; renamed Herringfleet Junction 1891; renamed Haddiscoe High Level 9 May 1904; closed 2 November 1959
- **Marsh Junction; divergence of line to Halesworth**
- Somerleyton; opened 1 July 1847
- Mutford; opened 1 July 1847; renamed Oulton Broad Mutford 1881; renamed Oulton Broad 1915; renamed Oulton Broad North 1927
- Lowestoft; opened 1 July 1847; later known as Lowestoft Central
