= Norwich and Brandon Railway =

Norwich and Brandon Railway Act 1844
- Act of Parliament
- Parliament of the United Kingdom
- Long title: An Act for making a Railway from Norwich to Brandon, with a Branch to Thetford.
- Citation: 7 & 8 Vict. c. xv

Dates
- Royal assent: 10 May 1844

The Norwich and Brandon Railway (N&BR) was the second railway in Norfolk, England, after the Yarmouth and Norwich Railway (Y&NR). Its act of Parliament, the Norwich and Brandon Railway Act 1844 (7 & 8 Vict. c. xv), on 10 May 1844 authorised it to build a line between Norwich and the small town of Brandon, actually just across the border in Suffolk.

== Construction and opening ==
The line from Norwich to Brandon was constructed by Messrs Grissell & Peto, and the engineers were Robert Stephenson (1803–1859) and George Parker Bidder (1806–1878). It is likely that it was Bidder, rather than Stephenson, who was closely involved with the project on a day-to-day basis. Construction of the 40 miles were completed with a ceremonial opening on 29 July 1845, at the same time as the Eastern Counties Railway celebrated their through route from Shoreditch, London, to Brandon, albeit via the leased Northern and Eastern Railway line from Stratford, London to Newport; the regular passenger service followed on 30 July 1845. The first temporary terminus was just west of the River Wensum, pending the completion of the Trowse swing bridge which was achieved in December 1845. Through services from Shoreditch to Norwich Thorpe station started on 15 December 1845.

Generous provision was made for the maintenance of locomotives at Brandon with a six road engine house being provided although once the ECR took over the NR in 1848 the shed's role was diminished as there was no longer a requirement to change locomotives there as they worked through to or from Norwich.

== Merger ==
Norwich and Brandon Railway Act 1845
- Act of Parliament
- Parliament of the United Kingdom
- Long title: An Act for altering the Line of the Norwich and Brandon Railway, and for making a Branch therefrom to East Dereham in the County of Norfolk.
- Citation: 8 & 9 Vict. c. cliv

Dates
- Royal assent: 31 July 1845

A month before opening the N&BR and Y&NR had merged via an act of Parliament, the Norfolk Railway Act 1845 (8 & 9 Vict. c. xli), of 30 June 1845 to form the Norfolk Railway, with 58 route miles, itself a founding constituent of the Great Eastern Railway amalgamation in 1862.
