= Ashwellthorpe and Fundenhall =

Civil parish in Norfolk, England

Coordinates: 52°32′N 1°10′E

Ashwellthorpe
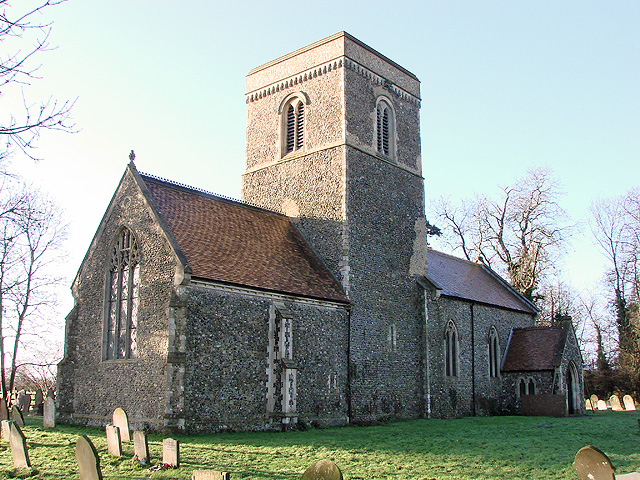
- St Nicholas' Church, Fundenhall

- Location within Norfolk
- Area: 9.74 km^{2} (3.76 sq mi)
- Population: 750 (2011)
  - Density: 77/km^{2} (200/sq mi)
- OS grid reference: TM 151 974
- Shire county: Norfolk
- Region: East
- Country: England
- Sovereign state: United Kingdom
- Post town: NORWICH
- Postcode district: NR16
- Dialling code: 01508
- Police: Norfolk
- Fire: Norfolk
- Ambulance: East of England

Ashwellthorpe and Fundenhall is a civil parish in the English county of Norfolk 3 1/2 miles (5.6 km) southeast of Wymondham and 9 miles (14 km) southwest of Norwich. The parish includes the villages of Ashwellthorpe and Fundenhall, which lie about 1 mile (1.6 km) apart, although further by road.

The civil parish has an area of 3.76 square miles (9.74 km^{2}) and in the 2001 census had a population of 756 in 301 households. The population dropped to 750 in the 2011 Census. For local government, the parish falls within the district of South Norfolk. Fundenhall was a separate parish until it was annexed by Ashwellthorpe in 1935. The combined parish was known as Ashwellthorpe until 2003, when it adopted its current name.

== Railway ==
Ashwellthorpe had a railway station on the Forncett to Wymondham line; it closed to passengers in 1939.
