= Thuxton railway station =

Railway station in Norfolk, England

Thuxton
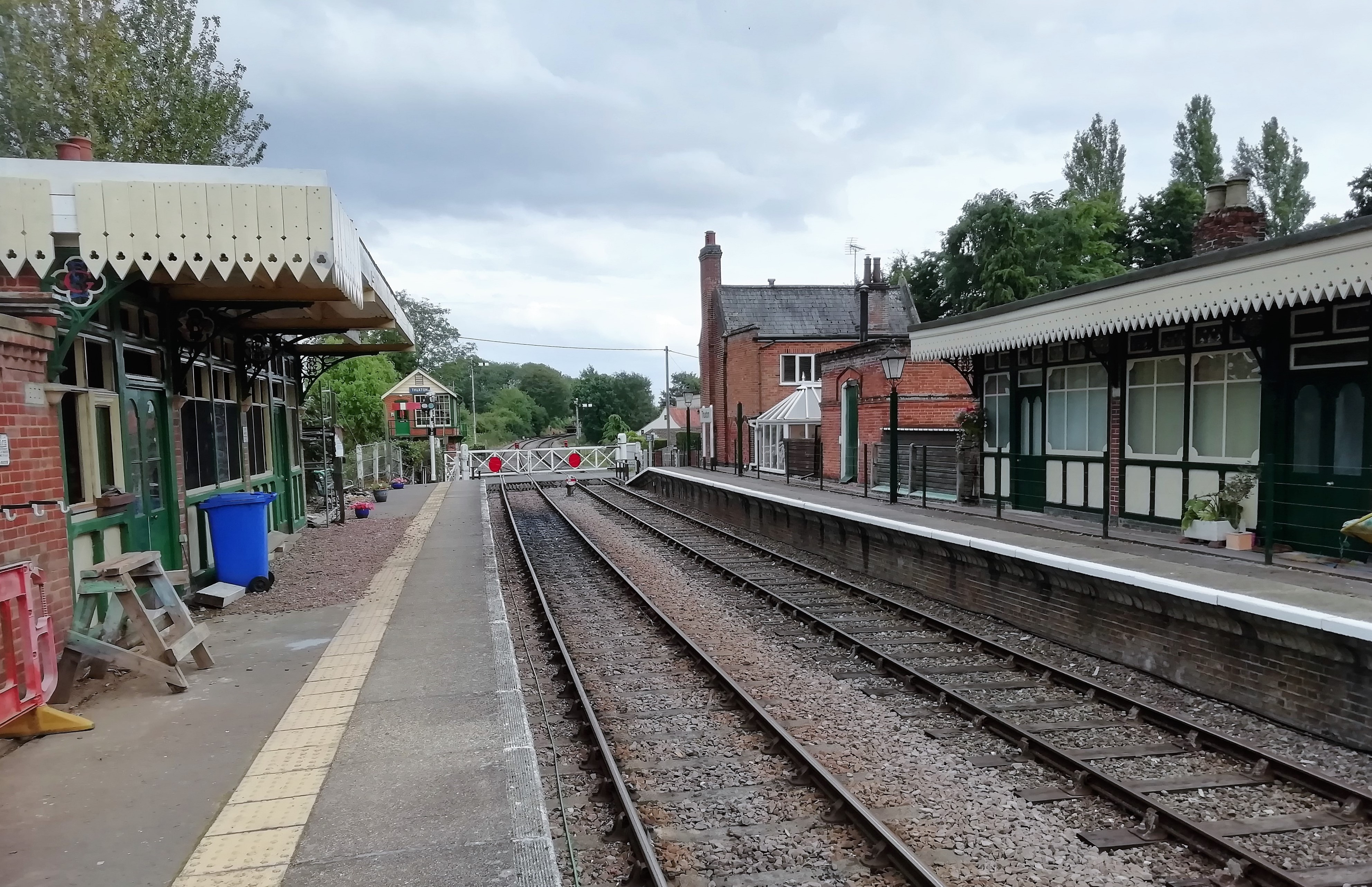
- Thuxton station, 2019

General information
- Location: Thuxton, Breckland, Norfolk; England
- Coordinates: 52.6247°N 1.001°E
- Grid reference: TG031072
- System: Station on heritage railway
- Owner: London & North Eastern Railway; Eastern Region of British Railways; Mid-Norfolk Railway
- Manager: Norfolk Railway; Great Eastern Railway
- Platforms: 2

Key dates
- 15 February 1847: Opened
- 13 July 1964: Closed to freight
- 6 October 1969: Closed to passengers
- 26 July 1997: Reopened as part of MNR
Location

Thuxton is a railway station in the village of Thuxton in the English county of Norfolk. The station is served by heritage services operated by the Mid-Norfolk Railway on the line from Dereham to Wymondham.

When re-opened by the Mid-Norfolk Railway in 1997 the station was initially used as a request stop, but was returned to full stopping status on 16 June 2002.

During fundraising for the opening of the MNR, a station was proposed for the nearby village of Garveston, and the local council purchased a small parcel of land for use as a car park at the proposed site. No platform was provided, and the station has never been developed.

== History ==
The Wymondham-Dereham branch line and stations were opened on 15 February 1847.

Thuxton is a two-platform station. The main building, which included the Stationmaster's house was built by the Norfolk Railway. The Great Eastern Railway later added glass-fronted waiting rooms to the platforms.

The station was equipped with a single siding goods yard on the down side of the formation. The yard was to the north of the passenger station, with no goods shed or fixed loading facilities. A well-known seasonal traffic from the site was Peele’s Norfolk Black Turkeys.

From June 1965, when the line was singled, until late 2010 only the down platform was used for passenger services. The up line platform, where the waiting room was demolished, has since been restored to its original length as part of the passing loop project and a new waiting room is being constructed on the original footprint and will mirror the waiting room on the down platform.

== Present day ==
Most trains currently use the extended up platform. The waiting room on the down platform has been converted for use as holiday accommodation. There is no passenger car parking available near this station due to the narrow lanes through the village. The station serves as a passing place for trains, as a station for the local community and the Railway Lake fishing venue.

== Engineering projects ==
=== Passing loop ===
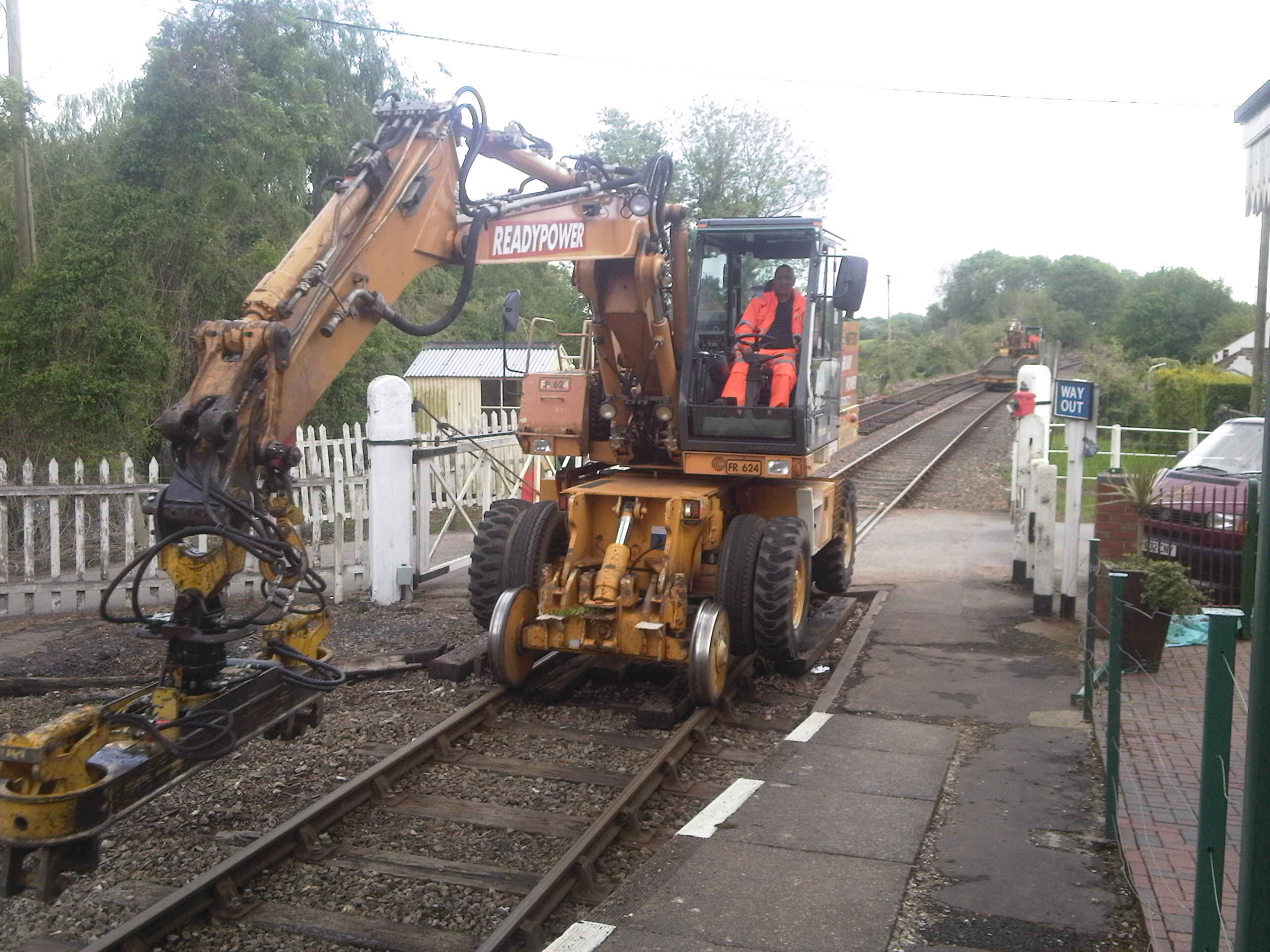
Relaying Thuxton loop, May 2009

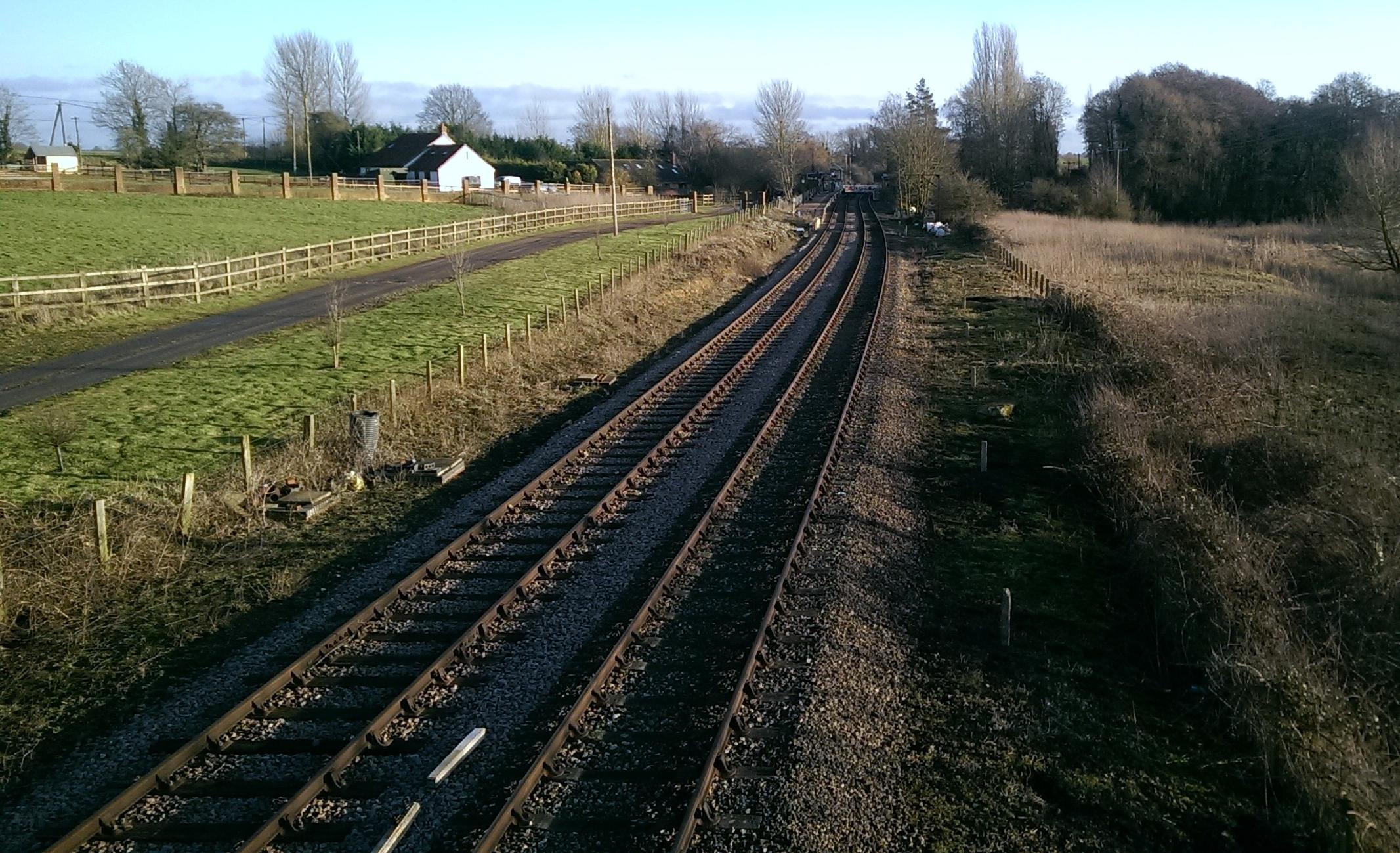
The completed loop, January 2015

Work to relay the lifted up formation and restore the second platform at this station, in order to provide a passing loop for trains running between Dereham and Wymondham, was completed in time for the September 2010 diesel gala.

The loop is intended to be controlled by a signal box built using components from the box from East Winch railway station on the Dereham to King's Lynn line, and includes provision for an eventual restoration of a section of double track railway south of the station potentially to Kimberley Park. The McKenzie and Holland lever frame recovered from Seven Sisters signal box was installed in the signal box at Thuxton in August 2014 with plans to commission it during 2015.

The crossover to the south of the station was completed by volunteer staff during January 2009. The northern point and track panels either side of the level crossing were laid by contractors during May and ballasted during June. Work on the signal box also commenced in June.

The second track over the level crossing was restored over the weekend of 11–14 June 2010, with Class 31 diesel 31438 becoming the first locomotive, since the singling of the route, to pass over the level crossing on this side of the formation on 12 June 2010. Some local residents were unhappy about aspects of the restoration, citing concerns about disruption and the narrow access lane being blocked.

== Signal box ==
Location	Original location	Built by	Notes	Photograph
Thuxton	New build	Mid-Norfolk Railway	The original Thuxton signal box was located to the north of the station platforms, but was downgraded to ground frame status in 1933 and demolished before 1955. The replacement box is located on a new site to the south of the level crossing in the design of Shippea Hill signal box in Cambridgeshire, using some components from the cabin of East Winch signal box, Norfolk. The signalbox is fitted with a 26 lever McKenzie and Holland frame, dating from 1904, and recovered from Seven Sisters railway station in London. This frame is fitted with a 'cam and tappet' mechanical locking system.	

Preceding station	Heritage railways	Following station
Yaxham towards Dereham	Mid-Norfolk Railway	Kimberley Park towards Wymondham Abbey
Historical railways
Yaxham; Line and station open	British Rail; Eastern Region; Wymondham to Wells via East Dereham	Hardingham; Line and station open
Proposed service
Yaxham	Norfolk Orbital Railway; Mid-Norfolk Railway	Hardingham
