= Kimberley Park railway station =

Railway station in Norfolk, England

Kimberley Park
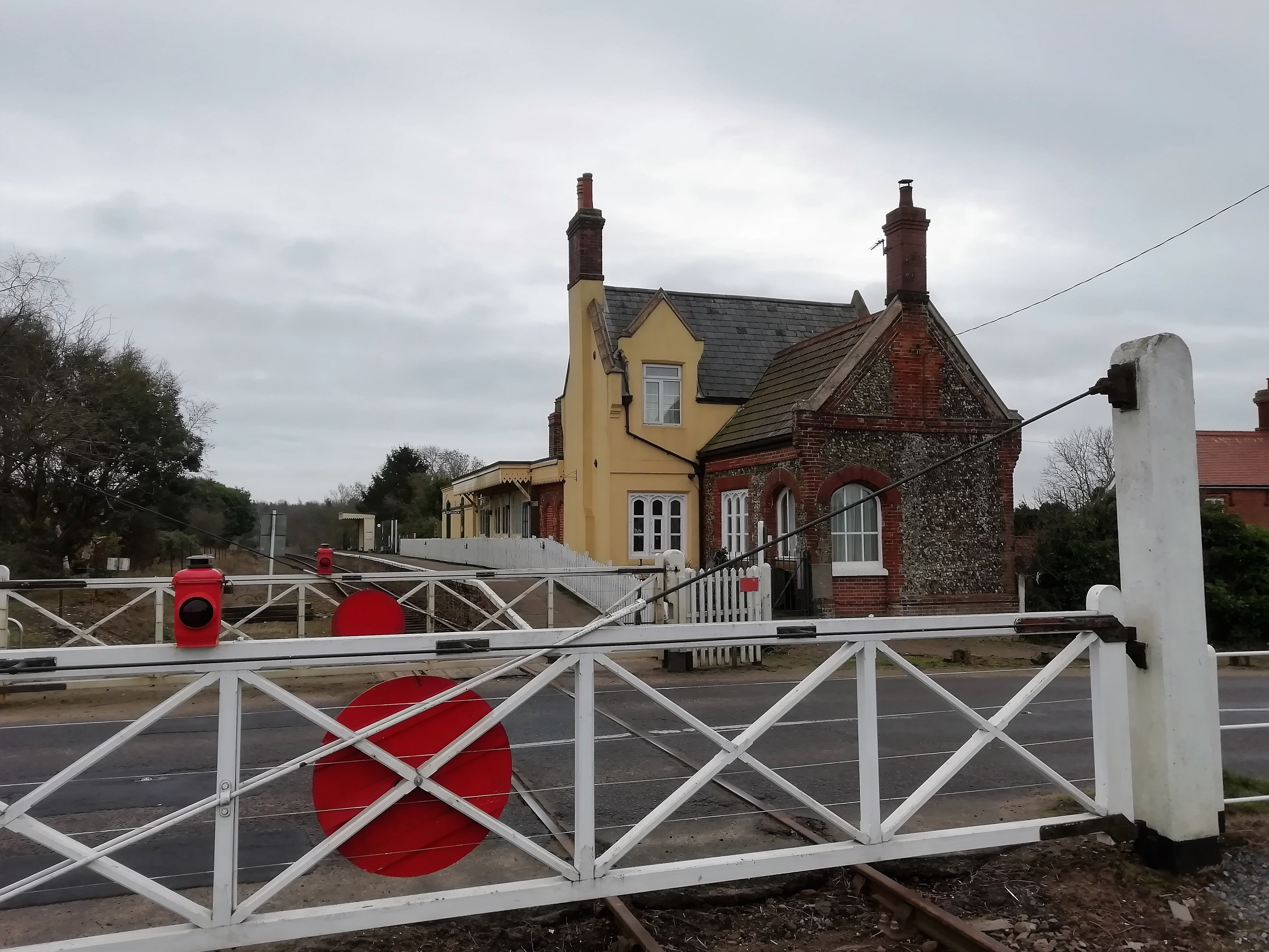
- Kimberley Park station, 2018

General information
- Location: Kimberley, Breckland; England
- Coordinates: 52.591101°N 1.051945°E
- Grid reference: TG068036
- System: Station on heritage railway
- Owner: London & North Eastern Railway; Eastern Region of British Railways; Great Eastern Railway (1989) Ltd. Mid-Norfolk Railway
- Manager: Great Eastern Railway
- Platforms: 1

Key dates
- 15 February 1847: Opened as Kimberley
- 1 July 1923: Renamed Kimberley Park
- 13 July 1964: Closed to freight
- 6 October 1969: Closed to passengers
- 22 May 2004: Reopened as part of MNR
Location

Kimberley Park railway station is a railway station in the village of Kimberley in the English county of Norfolk.

== History ==
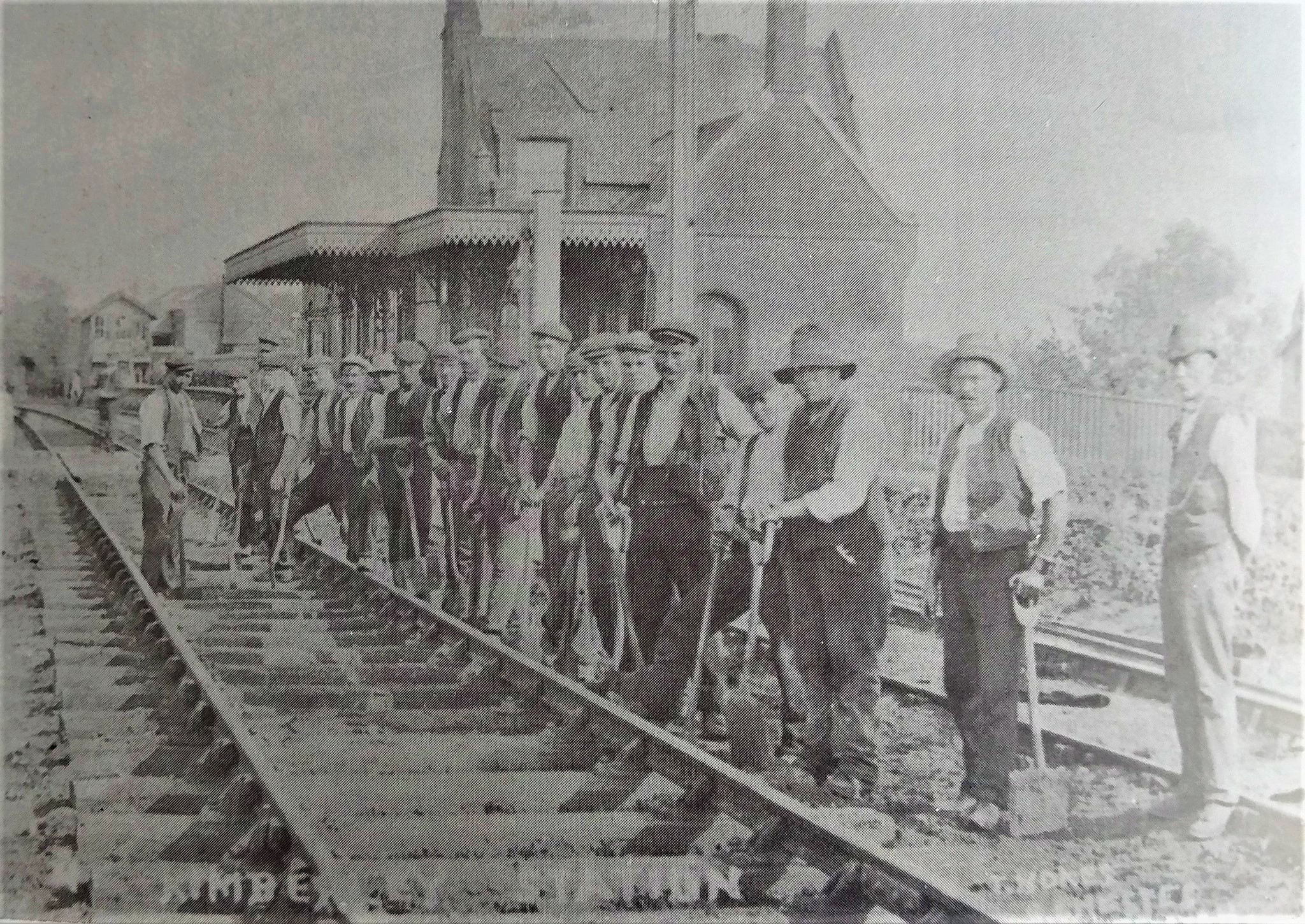
1880s track workers at Kimberley, showing the station, signal box and goods shed.

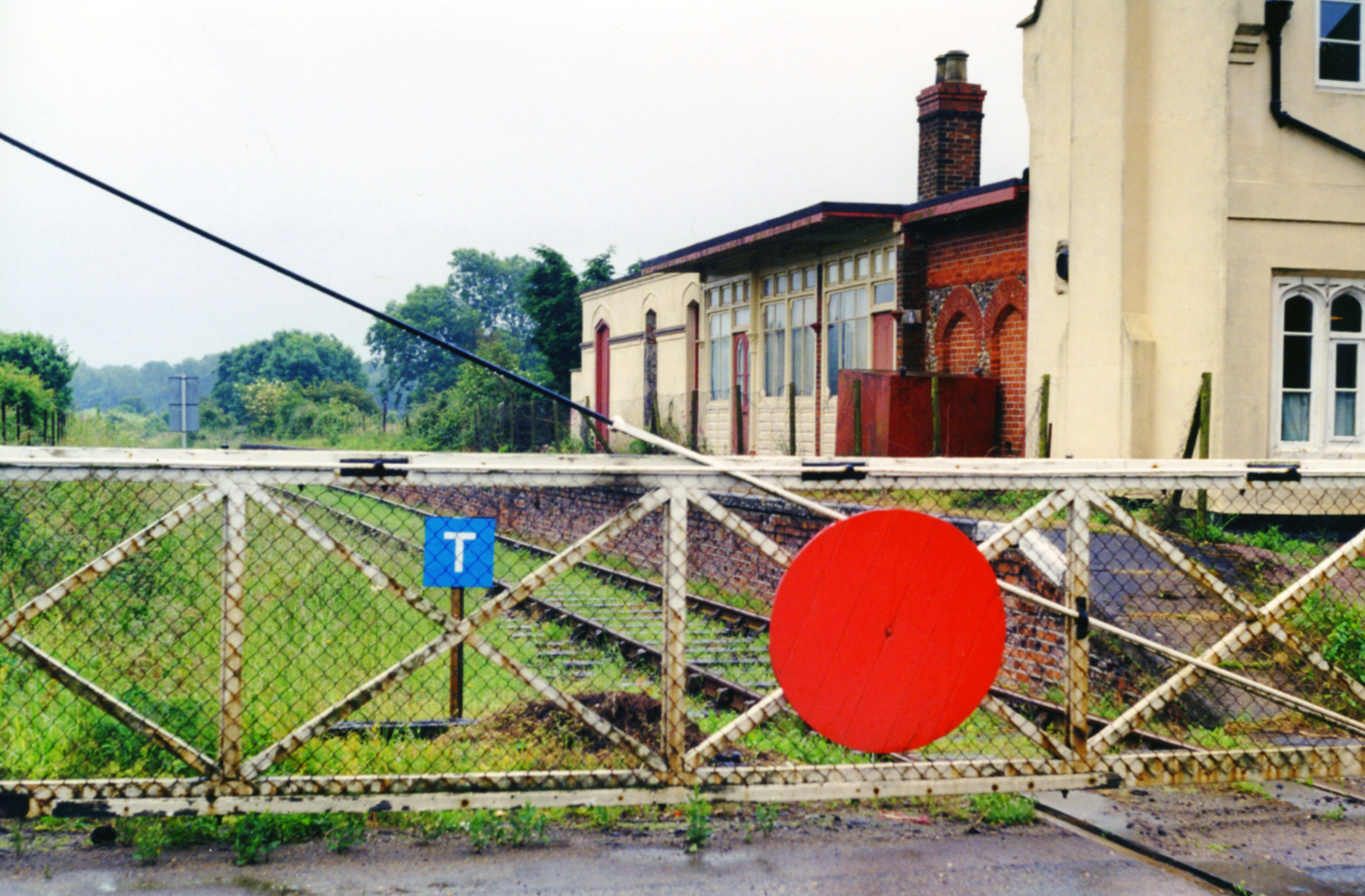
Kimberley Park station, 1998.

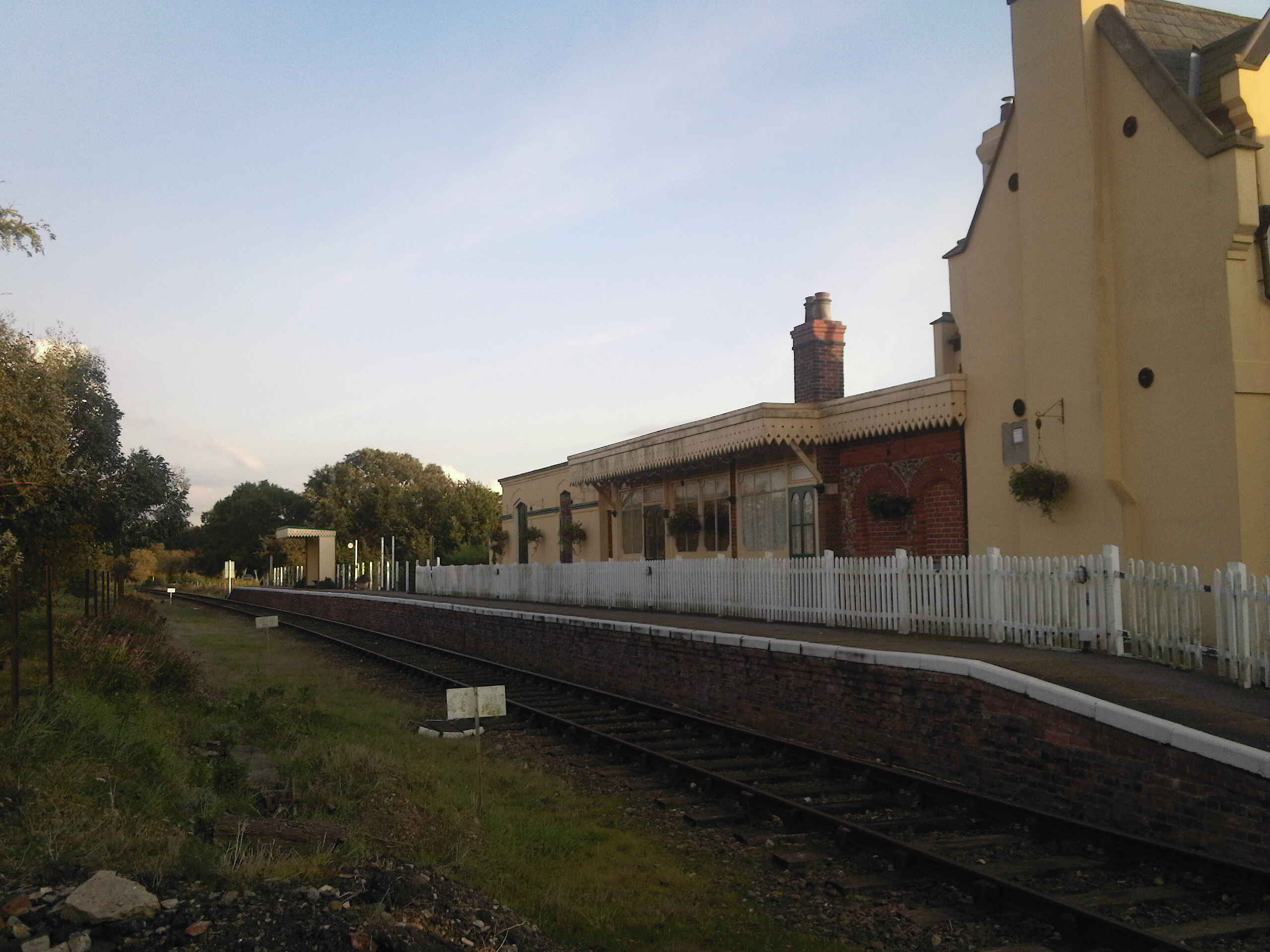
Kimberley Park station, 2008.

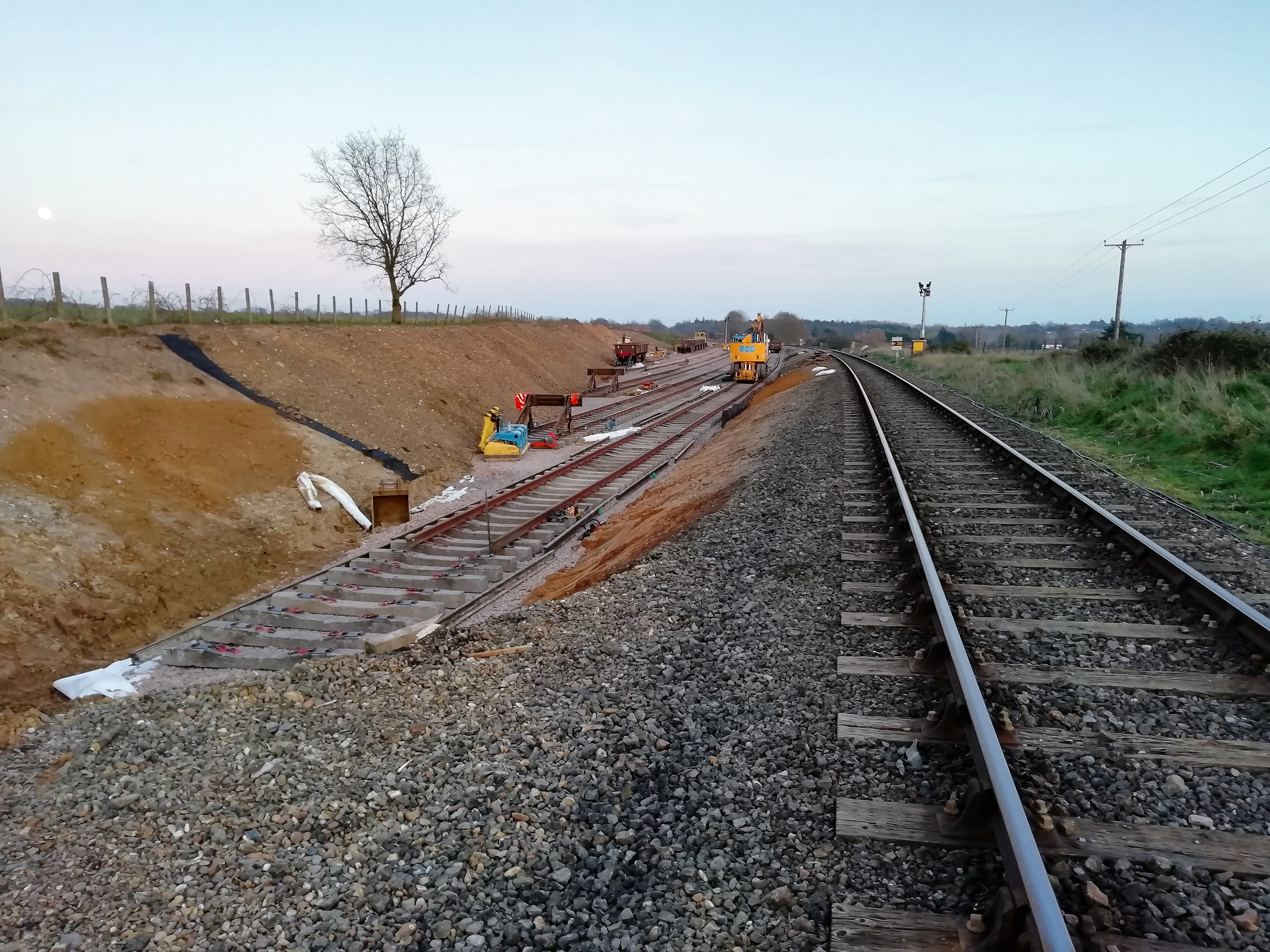
Kimberley's Ballast Pit Yard, 2019.

The Wymondham-Dereham branch line was built by the Norfolk Railway and the line and stations were opened on 15 February 1847.

The station was rebuilt by the Great Eastern Railway and provided with a second platform when the line was doubled in the early 1880s. A new up platform was constructed, and the existing buildings were given new glass-fronted passenger accommodation and platform canopies. In 1882 the station was considered a request stop.

Until 1923 the station was known as Kimberley, but this was changed to Kimberley Park during the Grouping to avoid confusion with Kimberley station in Nottinghamshire. The main buildings were on the "down" platform, with a smaller waiting room being provided on the "up" platform.

The goods yard was situated on the "down" side of the line, comprising a single siding linked by trailing connections to the up and down main lines. Kimberley was provided with loading docks and a cattle pen.

== Present day ==
There is no public car parking at this station. The station is served by heritage services operated by the Mid-Norfolk Railway on the line from Dereham to Wymondham Abbey.

A 5-road sidings were built east the line at the 4-mile post, north of the station, using a former quarry and a part of the former main line formation. This was used to store new Class 745 and Class 755 rolling stock for Abellio Greater Anglia until they entered service. Most were brought directly to Kimberley Park from Ripple Lane exchange sidings after being transported through the Channel Tunnel.

== Ballast Pit Yard ==
A 5-road secure yard has been created to the north of the station as part of a £3.25M agreement to provide siding capacity for approximately thirty Class 755 multiple units for Greater Anglia. A modification to the plan for the creation of this yard involved the removal of a section of the up formation of the line to slightly extend the storage capacity of one siding, replacing the original plan to relay the second line from Hardingham to Kimberley.

== Signal box ==
The original standard GER signal box was located at the southern end of the down platform, where the footings can still be clearly seen. The Mid-Norfolk Railway published an intention to replace this 'box, in an alternate location on the currently out-of-use up platform, with the cabin from Soham.

Preceding station	Heritage railways	Following station
Thuxton towards Dereham	Mid-Norfolk Railway	Wymondham Abbey Terminus
Historical railways
Hardingham; Line open, station closed	British Rail; Eastern Region; Wymondham to Wells via East Dereham	Wymondham; Line and station open. No scheduled passenger service.
Proposed service
Hardingham	Norfolk Orbital Railway; Mid-Norfolk Railway	Wymondham Abbey
