= Wymondham railway station =

Railway station in Norfolk, England

Coordinates: 52.56484°N 1.11765°E

Wymondham
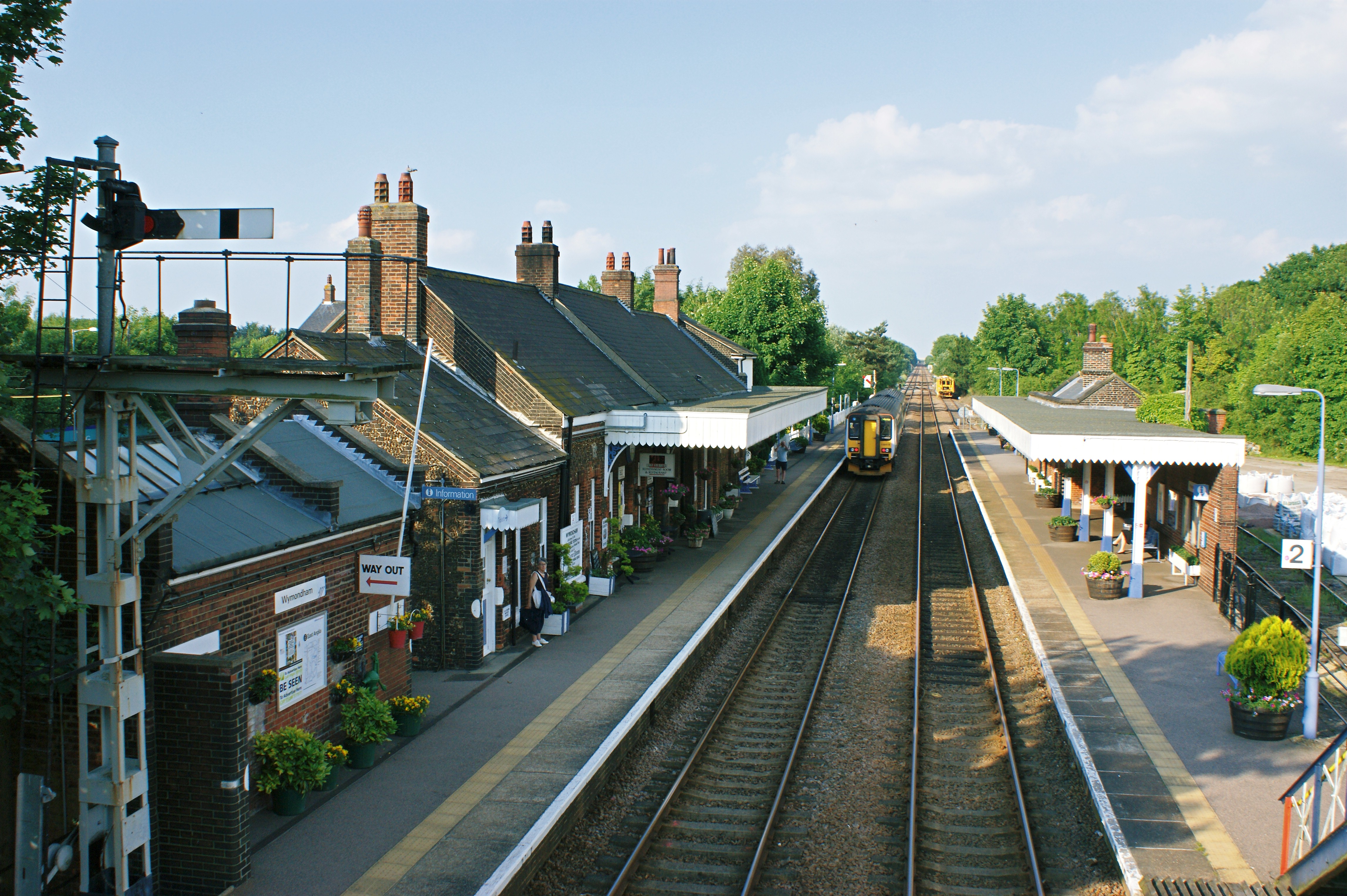

General information
- Location: Wymondham, South Norfolk; England
- Grid reference: TG114009
- Managed by: Greater Anglia
- Platforms: 2

Other information
- Station code: WMD
- Classification: DfT category F1

History
- Opened: 30 July 1845

Passengers
- 2020/21: ▼56,424
- 2021/22: ▲0.150 million
- 2022/23: ▲0.196 million
- 2023/24: ▼0.186 million
- 2024/25: ▲0.198 million
Location
Notes
- Passenger statistics from the Office of Rail and Road

Designations

Listed Building – Grade II
- Official name: Wymondham Railway Station (Main Building) and North Platform
- Type: Listed Building
- Criteria: Architectural; Historic; Group
- Designated: July 14, 1972
- Reference no.: 1208540

Wymondham railway station is a stop on the Breckland Line in the East of England, serving the market town of Wymondham, Norfolk. The line runs between Cambridge in the west and Norwich in the east. It is situated between Spooner Row and Norwich, 113 miles 72 chains (183.3 km) from London Liverpool Street via Ely.

The station is managed by Greater Anglia, which also operates most of the services calling at the station; some East Midlands Railway services also stop here.

Wymondham is also at a junction with the Mid-Norfolk Railway, a heritage route to Dereham; those services operate from a separate station, Wymondham Abbey, which is approximately one mile away. Wymondham was also once the junction of a branch line to Forncett, via Ashwellthorpe.

In 2017, the station's bistro was described in a BBC article.

== History ==
The Norwich and Brandon Railway Act 1844 (7 & 8 Vict. c. xv) authorising the Norwich and Brandon Railway (N&BR) received royal assent on 10 May 1844. Work started on the line in 1844 and the line and its stations were opened on 30 July 1845. Wymondham station opened with the line and was, when it opened, situated east of Spooner Row and west of Spinks Lane. The line ran from Ely to Trowse, in Norwich. The link into Norwich was delayed due to the need to build a bridge over the River Wensum that kept the river navigable.

One month before the N&BR opened the Norfolk Railway Act 1845 (8 & 9 Vict. c. xli) authorising the amalgamation of the Yarmouth and Norwich Railway with the N&BR came into effect and so Wymondham station became a Norfolk Railway asset.

In November 1845 Spinks Lane station was permanently closed as the NR determined that having two stations in the village was excessive. With the closure of Spinks Lane the next station east of Wymondham became Hethersett.

On 15 February 1847 Wymondham became a junction station with the opening of the Wymondham to Wells Branch to Dereham and Wells-next-the-Sea. The first station on the branch after Wymondham was Kimberley Park, then known simply as Kimberley.

The Great Eastern Railway Act 1862 (25 & 26 Vict. c. ccxxiii) was passed on 7 August 1862 to authorise the amalgamation of the Eastern Counties Railway, the Eastern Union Railway and others, which formed the Great Eastern Railway, which had taken place on 1 July 1862.

19 years after the GER was formed the GER promoted a bill to build a cut-off line from Forncett via Ashwellthorpe on the Great Eastern Main Line to the Norwich-Ely line at Wymondham. The line was authorised by the Great Eastern Railway Act 1876 (39 & 40 Vict. c. lxviii) and work started in 1880 and the line opened on 2 May 1881.

The difficult economic circumstances after World War I led the government to pass the Railways Act 1921 which led to the creation of the Big Four. The GER amalgamated with several other companies to create the London and North Eastern Railway (LNER). Wymondham became an LNER station on 1 January 1923. The line to Forncett closed in 1939.

On nationalisation in 1948 the station and its services were transferred to the Eastern Region of British Railways.

The Wells branch closed to passengers on 6 October 1969, with freight services continuing until 1989; the section of that line between Wymondham and Dereham forms the Mid-Norfolk Railway.

Upon privatisation the station and most of its services were transferred to Anglia Railways on 5 January 1997, with services towards the Midlands were transferred to Central Trains on 2 March 1997.

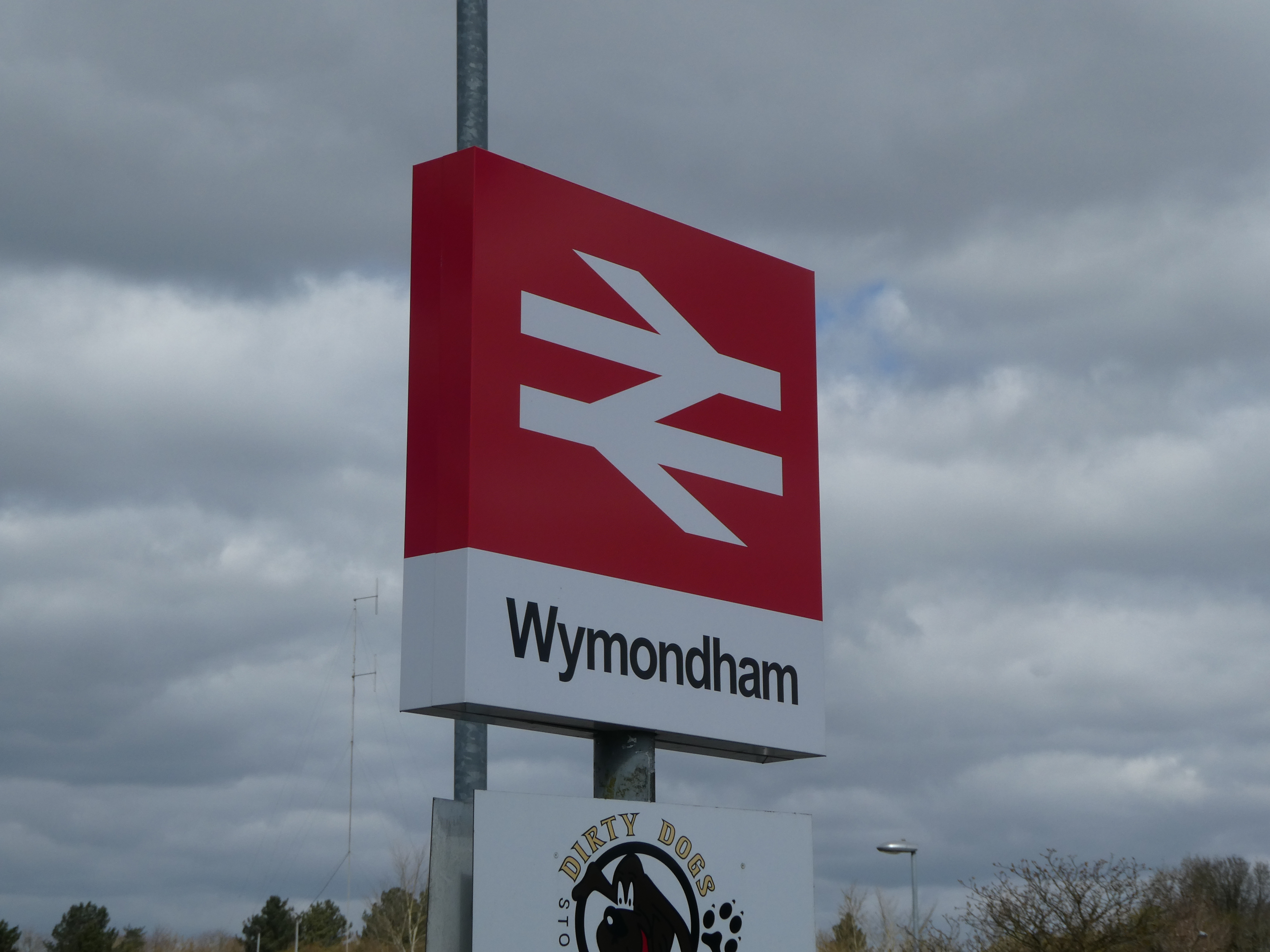
The station name sign, pictured in April 2021

On 1 April 2004 the station and its services were transferred to National Express East Anglia, then known as one. Three years later, on 11 November 2007, the Central Trains franchise was broken up and services between Liverpool and Norwich were transferred to East Midlands Trains. The station's ticket office reopened in 2005. On 5 February 2012 the station and its services were transferred to Abellio Greater Anglia. On 18 August 2019, all services operated by East Midlands Trains were transferred to East Midlands Railway, upon the expiry of EMT's franchise.

Until 2009 there was a telegraph pole route still in operation between Wymondham and Brandon. This was removed gradually during the early part of 2009 and was the last section remaining in England and one of the last remaining in the United Kingdom. In 2012 the local signal box was decommissioned (as indeed were all the boxes on the Breckland Line) and the semaphore signalling was replaced by lightweight LED signals controlled from Cambridge.

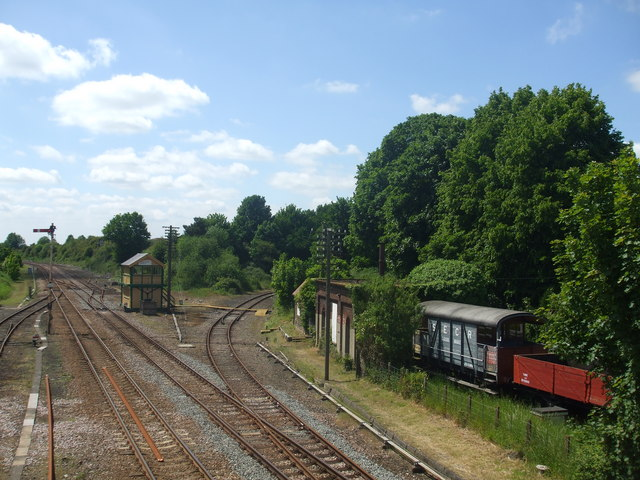
The signal box, Mid-Norfolk Railway line to the right, and old rolling stock. Pictured in May 2009

Wymondham is situated between Spooner Row and Norwich, 113 miles 72 chains (183.3 km) down-line from London Liverpool Street via Ely. The station is managed by Abellio Greater Anglia, which also operates most of the services calling at the station. Some East Midlands Railway services also stop at Wymondham.

=== Mid-Norfolk Railway ===
Wymondham is also the junction of the Mid-Norfolk Railway, a heritage railway route to Dereham, although those services operate from a separate station named Wymondham Abbey which is approximately one mile from Wymondham. Wymondham Junction is the name of a possible additional new station to be built closer to the mainline station.

== Services ==
Services at Wymondham are operated by Greater Anglia and East Midlands Railway.

The typical service is one train per hour in each direction between Norwich and Cambridge, operated by Greater Anglia. Most westbound services are extended beyond Cambridge to and from Stansted Airport.

The station is also served by a limited East Midlands Railway service of three trains per day in each direction between Norwich and Liverpool Lime Street via Nottingham. On Sundays, East Midlands Railway operate four trains per day towards Norwich only.

Preceding station	National Rail	Following station
Attleborough	Greater Anglia Breckland Line	Norwich
Spooner Row Limited Service	Greater Anglia Breckland Line	Norwich
Attleborough	East Midlands Railway: Norwich to Liverpool; Limited Service	Norwich
	Historical railways	
Kimberley Park Line and station closed	British Rail Eastern Region Wymondham to Wells Branch	Terminus
Eccles Road Line and station open	Norfolk Railway Norwich & Brandon Railway	Spinks Lane Line open, station closed
	Disused railways	
Terminus	London and North Eastern Railway Wymondham to Forncett via Ashwellthorpe	Ashwellthorpe

== Rolling stock ==
Until 2010 three items of rolling stock were displayed on a short section of isolated line laid close to the station, originally intended to house a camping coach. These were Drewry 0-4-0 diesel shunter VF D297 DC 2583 of 1956, disguised as a Class 04 tram locomotive, a British Railways tube wagon, and a SECR 25 ton brake van, formerly used as Stratford crane mess van. The wagons have since been relocated to Whitwell & Reepham railway station, with the locomotive moving to the Bressingham Steam Museum.

== Possible developments ==
The Mid-Norfolk Railway has proposed extending that line to an adjacent interchange station. The proposed Norfolk Orbital Railway would see services restored between Wymondham and the Norfolk coast, involving use of the track owned by the Mid-Norfolk Railway.
