= Yaxham railway station =

Railway station in Norfolk, England

Yaxham
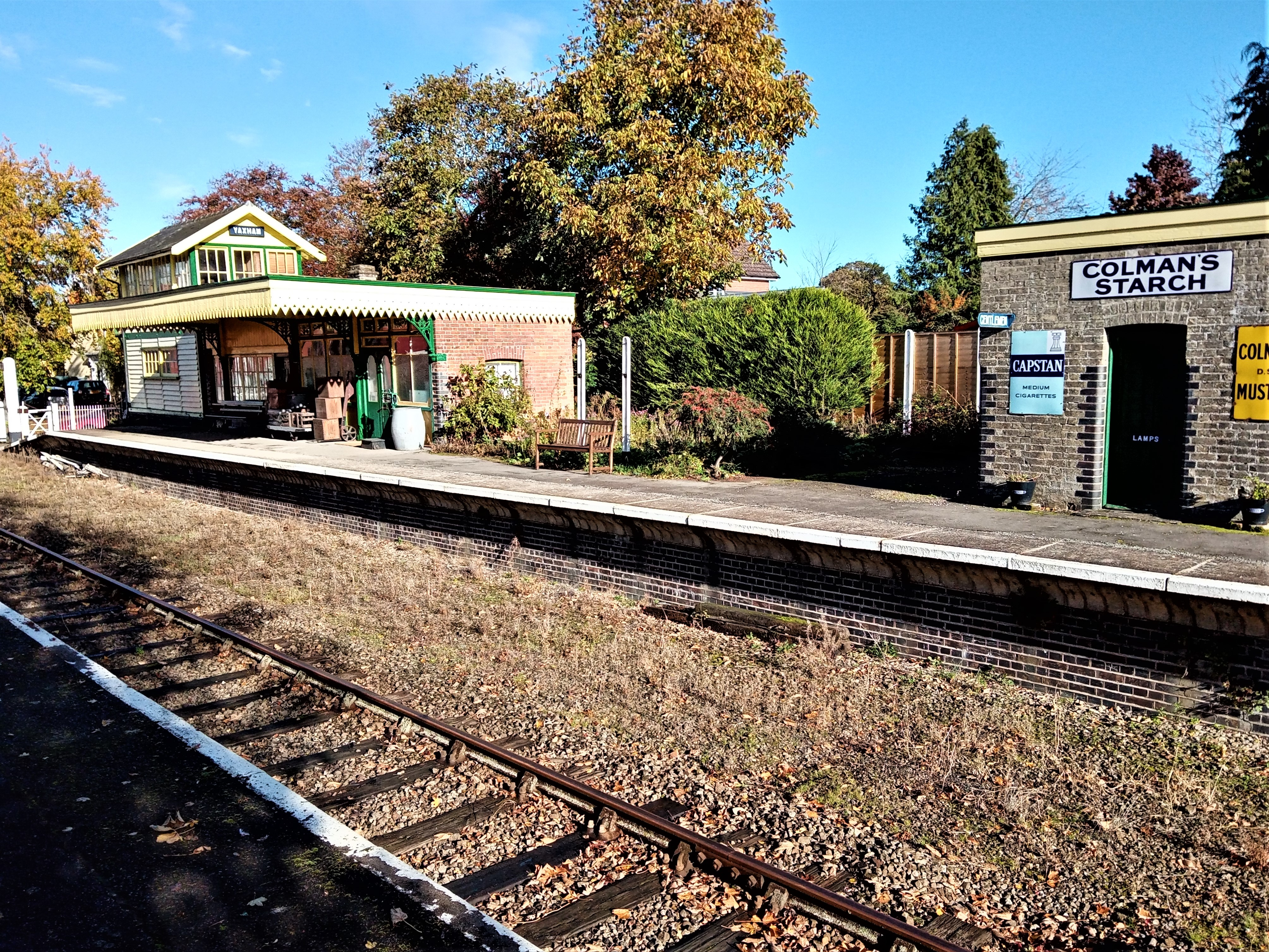
- Yaxham station, 2020

General information
- Location: Yaxham, Breckland; England
- Coordinates: 52.65163°N 0.95968°E
- Grid reference: TG002101
- System: Station on heritage railway
- Operator: Mid-Norfolk Railway
- Platforms: 2 (1 in use)

History
- Original company: Norfolk Railway
- Pre-grouping: Great Eastern Railway
- Post-grouping: London & North Eastern Railway; Eastern Region of British Railways

Key dates
- 15 February 1847: Opened
- 13 July 1964: Closed to freight
- 6 October 1969: Closed to passengers
- 26 July 1997: Reopened as part of MNR
Location

Yaxham is a railway station in the village of Yaxham in the English county of Norfolk. The station is served by heritage services operated by the Mid-Norfolk Railway and is the site of the Yaxham Light Railway.

The station is the only one on the line that retains its original signalbox (not owned by the MNR). The platform shelters on the up platform are still in situ, although those on the down platform used by the present service have been demolished. The original stationmaster's house survives as a private residence, as does the original railway hotel on the opposite side of the road to the station.

== History ==
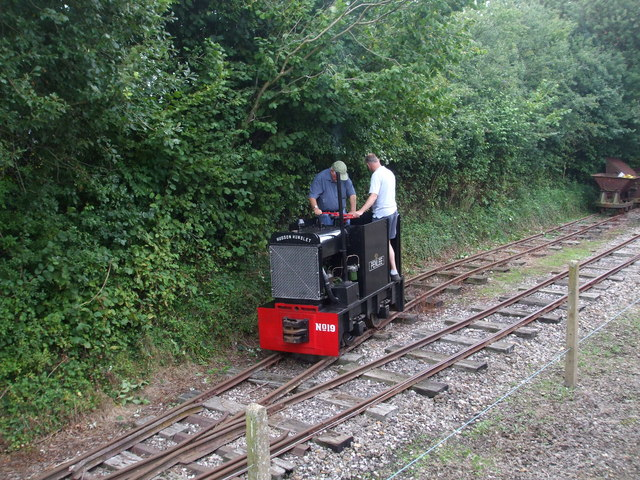
The Yaxham Light Railway

The station was opened by the Norfolk Railway on 15 February 1847 on the Wymondham to Dereham branch line. Yaxham was north of Thuxton and south of the terminus, Dereham. It was closed to freight on 13 July 1964, and to passengers on 6 October 1969.

The station's survival is mostly due to the late Mr David Charles Potter who took over the tenancy of the buildings, thereby saving them from demolition. Mr Potter opened the site's first narrow gauge line in the former goods yard in 1967. This was constructed for his Hunslet 0-4-0ST, "Cackler", and the disused tracks of this line can still be seen from passing trains on the Mid-Norfolk Railway. It was stated that these would be removed during 2013 to allow for the construction of a standard gauge siding in the yard for Norfolk Heritage Steam Railway Ltd who were restoring a steam locomotive at Yaxham, but in the event the locomotive moved to Bressingham in 2018.

In 1969 the loco was moved across the standard gauge line to the Yaxham Park Light Railway (YPLR), which ran for over half a mile in meadows beyond the station, eventually being replaced by today's Yaxham Light Railway. The station reopened on 23 December 1995.

== Facilities ==
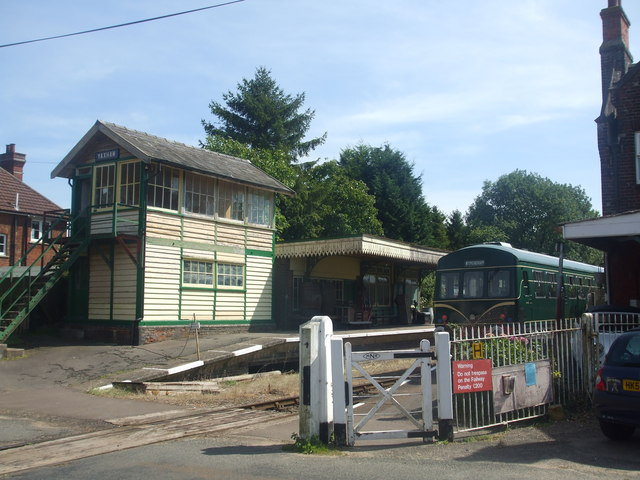
Yaxham station, 2009

Yaxham was a two-platform station. The main building, which included the Stationmaster's house was built by the Norfolk Railway. The Great Eastern Railway later added glass-fronted waiting rooms to the platforms.

The station was equipped with two goods yards, both on the down side of the formation. The main yard was to the south of the level crossing, equipped with a goods shed, coal wharf, cattle pen and end-loading dock, A smaller set of private sidings to the north of the level crossing served a granary.

Only the down platform remains in railway use, with its waiting room having been demolished. The brick-built goods shed survives, now isolated from the railway, being used by a company restoring steam locomotives and traction engines. The up line waiting room is used by an upholsterer.

== Signal box ==
Location	Original location	Built by	Notes	Photograph
Yaxham	-	Great Eastern Railway	The station was originally provided with a signal box to the north of the station. The signal box survives in private ownership, although missing its 26 lever McKenzie & Holland lever frame and is the only original signal box remaining on the route. The box is currently used by the Mid-Norfolk Railway as a crossing cabin.	

== Services ==
Preceding station	Heritage railways	Following station
Dereham Terminus	Mid-Norfolk Railway	Thuxton towards Wymondham Abbey
Historical railways
Dereham; Line and station open	British Rail; Eastern Region; Wymondham to Wells Branch	Thuxton; Line and station open
Proposed service
Dereham	Norfolk Orbital Railway; Mid-Norfolk Railway	Thuxton
