= Spinks Lane railway station =

Former railway station in England

Coordinates: 52.5754°N 1.144°E

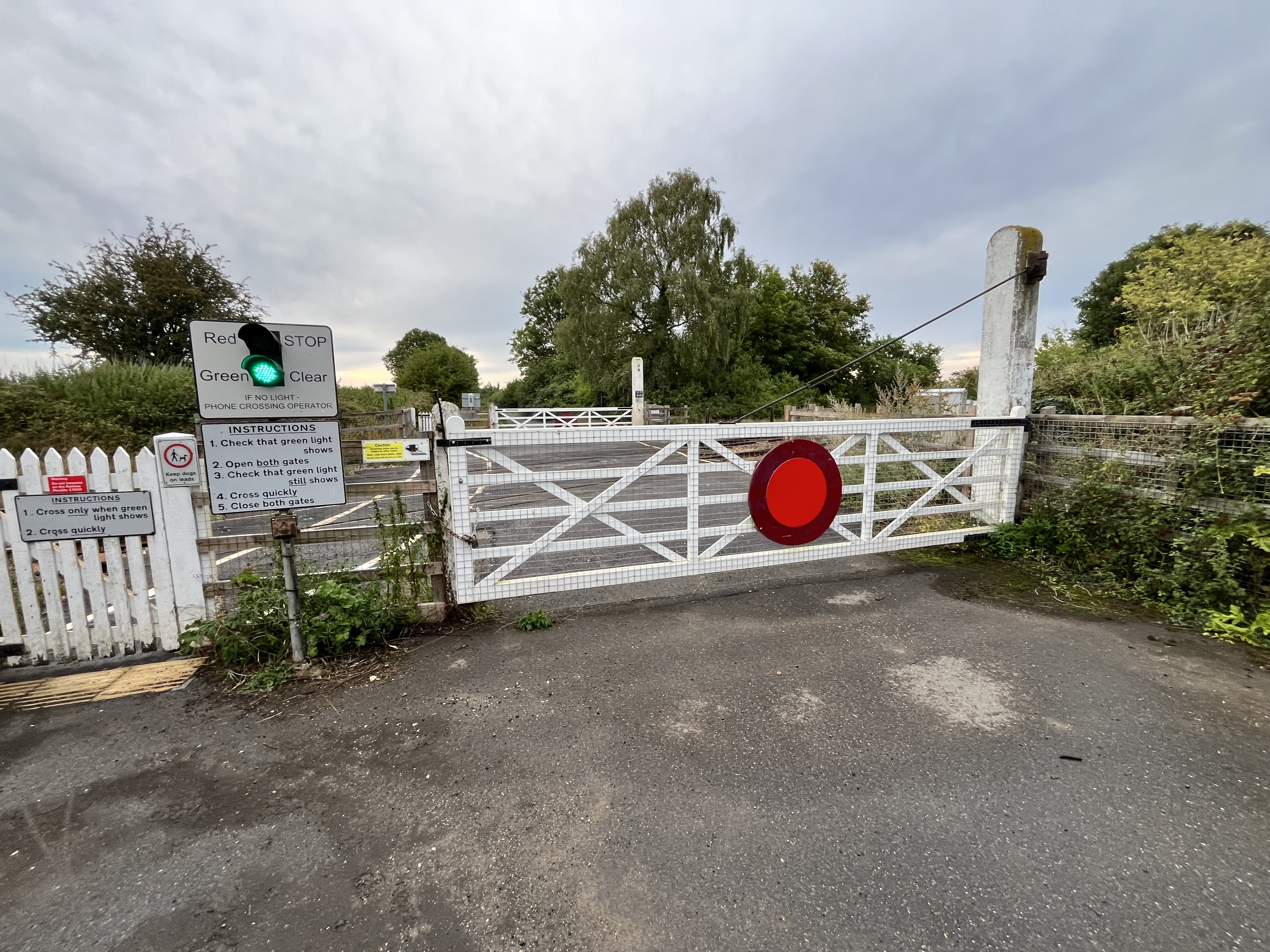
The site of the station today with no surviving evidence of the station.

Spinks Lane was a railway station on Spink's Lane on the eastern outskirts of Wymondham, Norfolk. It was opened very briefly in 1845 to trains on the line from Norwich.

The Norwich and Brandon Railway Act 1844 (7 & 8 Vict. c. xv) authorising the Norwich and Brandon Railway (N&BR) received royal assent on 10 May 1844. Work started on the line in 1844 and the line and its stations were opened on 30 July 1845. Spinks Lane station opened with the line and was situated east of Wymondham station and west of Hethersett. The line ran from Ely to Trowse. The link into Norwich was delayed due to the need to build a bridge over the River Wensum that kept the river navigable.

One month before the N&BR opened, the Norfolk Railway Act 1845 (8 & 9 Vict. c. xli) authorising the amalgamation of the Yarmouth and Norwich Railway with the N&BR came into effect and so Spinks Lane station became a Norfolk Railway asset.

However, two stations in the relatively small Wymondham was deemed to be excessive and Spinks Lane closed in November 1845 after only four months of operation.

The station building was still extant in 1983 but had been demolished by 1986.

Wymondham is the town's sole station today.

Former Services

Preceding station	Disused railways	Following station
Wymondham	Norfolk Railway	Hethersett
