= Hardingham railway station =

Railway station in Norfolk, England

Hardingham
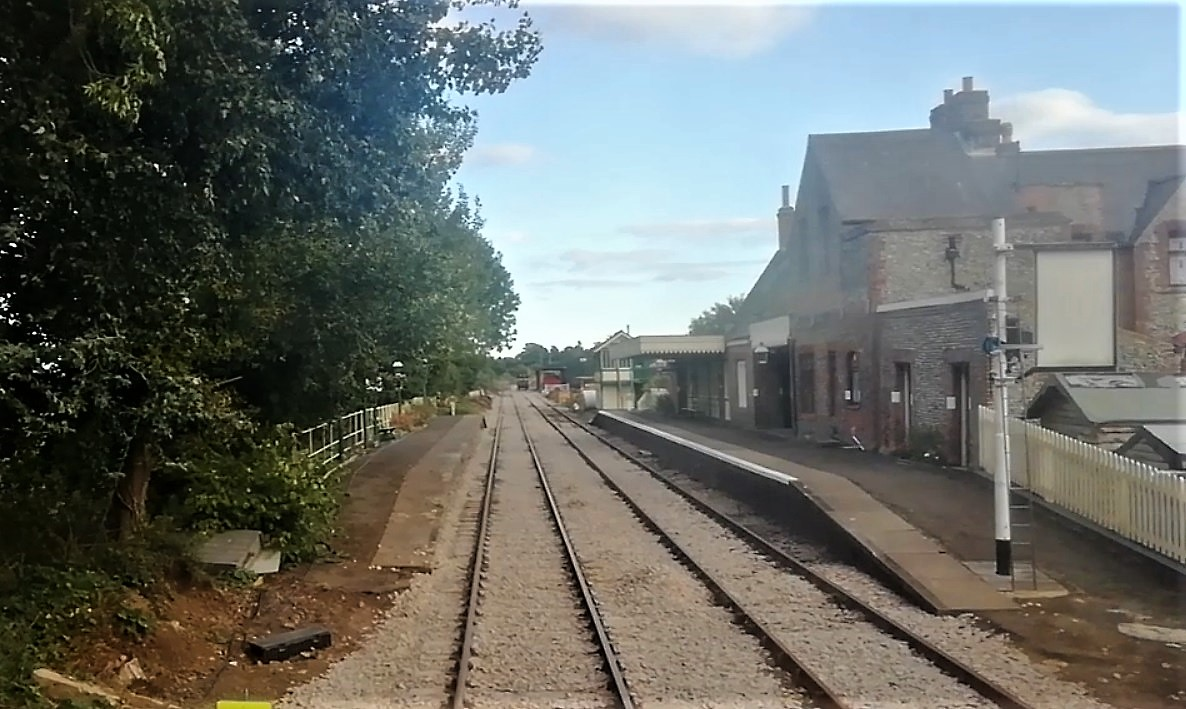

General information
- Location: Hardingham, Breckland, Norfolk; England
- Coordinates: 52.61041°N 1.02486°E
- Grid reference: TG049057
- System: Station on heritage railway
- Owner: London and North Eastern Railway; Eastern Region of British Railways
- Manager: Norfolk Railway; Great Eastern Railway
- Platforms: 2

Key dates
- 15 February 1847: Opened
- 18 April 1966: Closed to freight
- 6 October 1969: Closed to passengers
Location

Hardingham railway station is a railway station in the village of Hardingham in the English county of Norfolk. The station is periodically served by heritage services operated by the Mid-Norfolk Railway on the line from East Dereham to Wymondham.

The former yard is now used by an independent rolling stock company, Great Eastern Traction Ltd., specialising in trading in industrial locomotives. Other items of privately owned rolling stock have also been preserved in the former station yard.

== History ==
The Wymondham-Dereham branch line was built by the Norfolk Railway and the line and stations were opened on 15 February 1847.

The Tudoresque main station building was built on the down side of the line, and was of a similar style to the other stations on the line. The station included a two-storey station master's house and a single storey waiting room. The platform was protected by two canopies, one of which was possibly an original Norfolk Railway structure. The up platform buildings were more basic, comprising a simple waiting room. The GER signal cabin, with a 21 lever frame, was located at the north end of the up platform.

The goods yard was located on the down side, providing two sidings, each with a headshunt. A wagon turntable gave access to three short spurs. An additional siding was provided north of the station. Facilities included cattle pens, a loading dock, and a rail connected granary.

When the branch was singled in June 1968, Hardingham was retained as a passing loop until passenger services ended in October 1969.

== Signal box ==
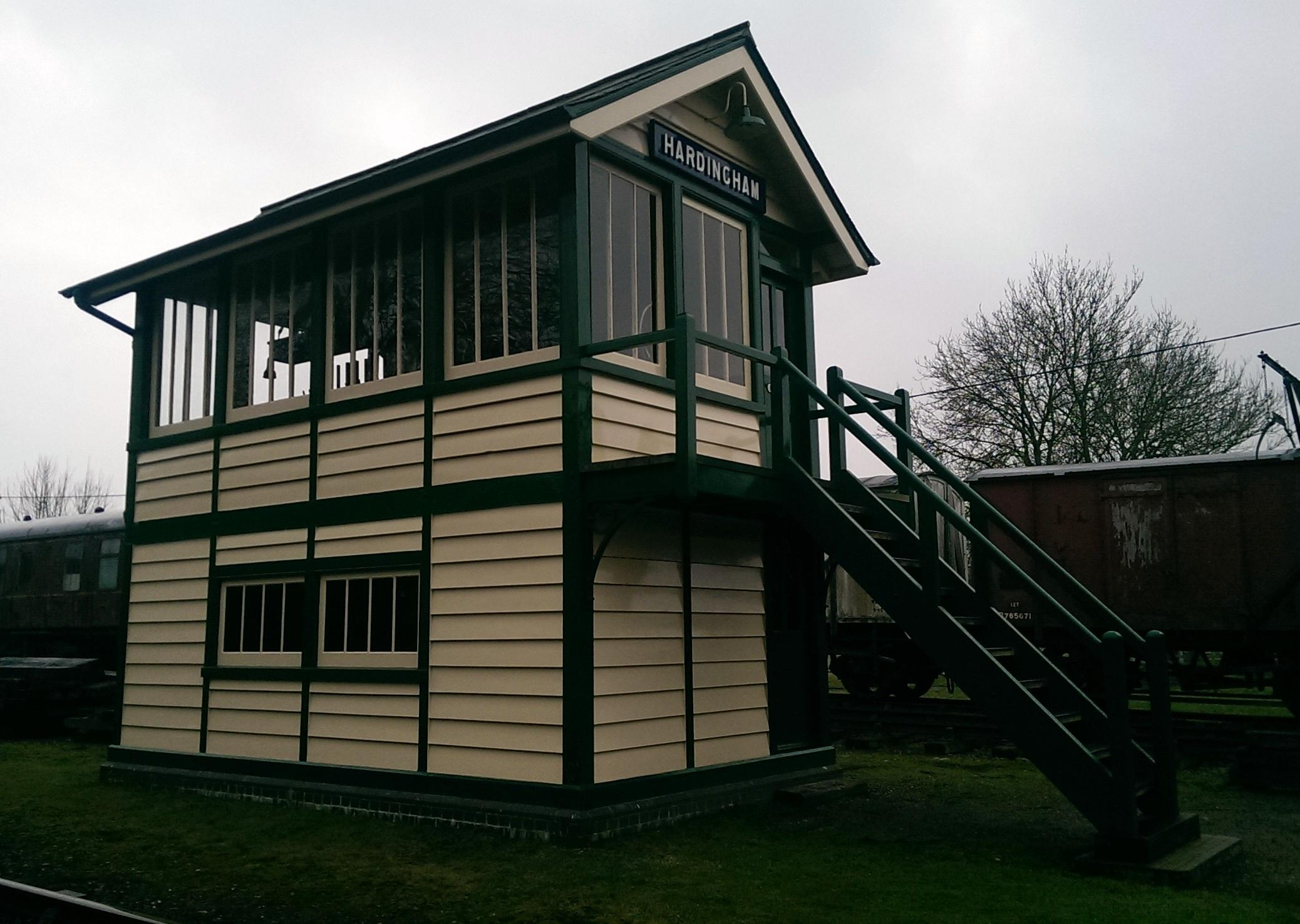
Hardingham signal box, 2015

The original signal box was located to the north of the station's up platform, but it was demolished after passenger closure with parts of it used to construct a number of sheds and shelters in the Stationmaster's garden. The non-operational replacement is located on a new site to the south of the down platform. The signal box is private property and does not constitute an operational structure on the railway. The eight year restoration of the box was recognised through a FirstGroup Craft Skills Award. The cabin is an original Great Eastern Railway structure, recovered from Snettisham, Norfolk and restored by the owner of the private station site.

== Engineering projects ==
=== Double track and storage sidings ===
A £3,000,000 project to relay the lifted up formation and restore the second platform at this station, in order to provide a storage siding for new Abellio Greater Anglia trains running between Hardingham and Kimberley, was conducted in 2018 and 2019. This involved the partial relaying of the lifted sections of the double line southwards towards Kimberley Park railway station, provision of a storage yard on the site of an original ballast quarry and erection of signalling - controlled from the signal box at Thuxton railway station. Track works were conducted by Sonic Rail Services.

== Rolling stock ==
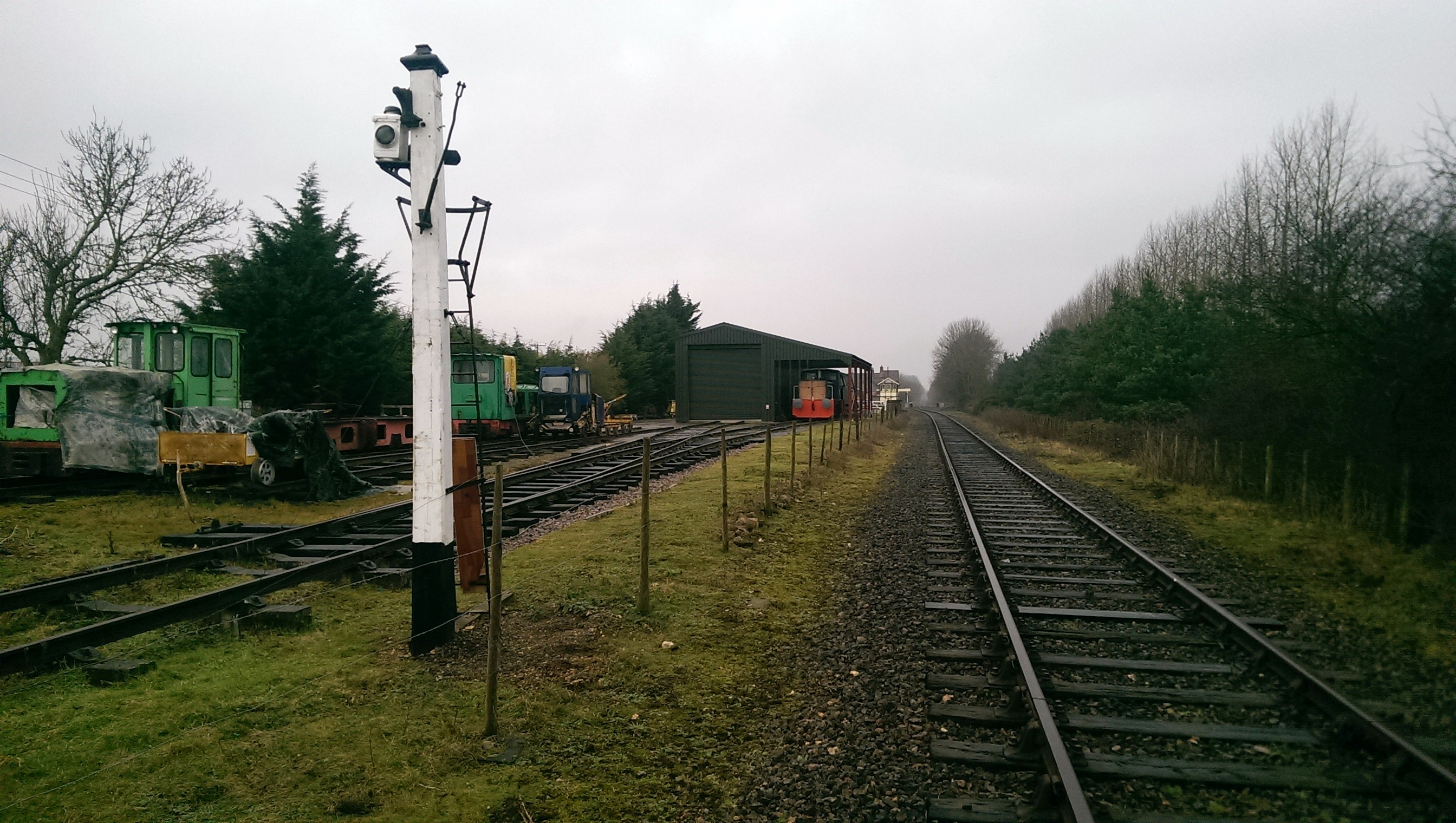
Hardingham yard, 2015

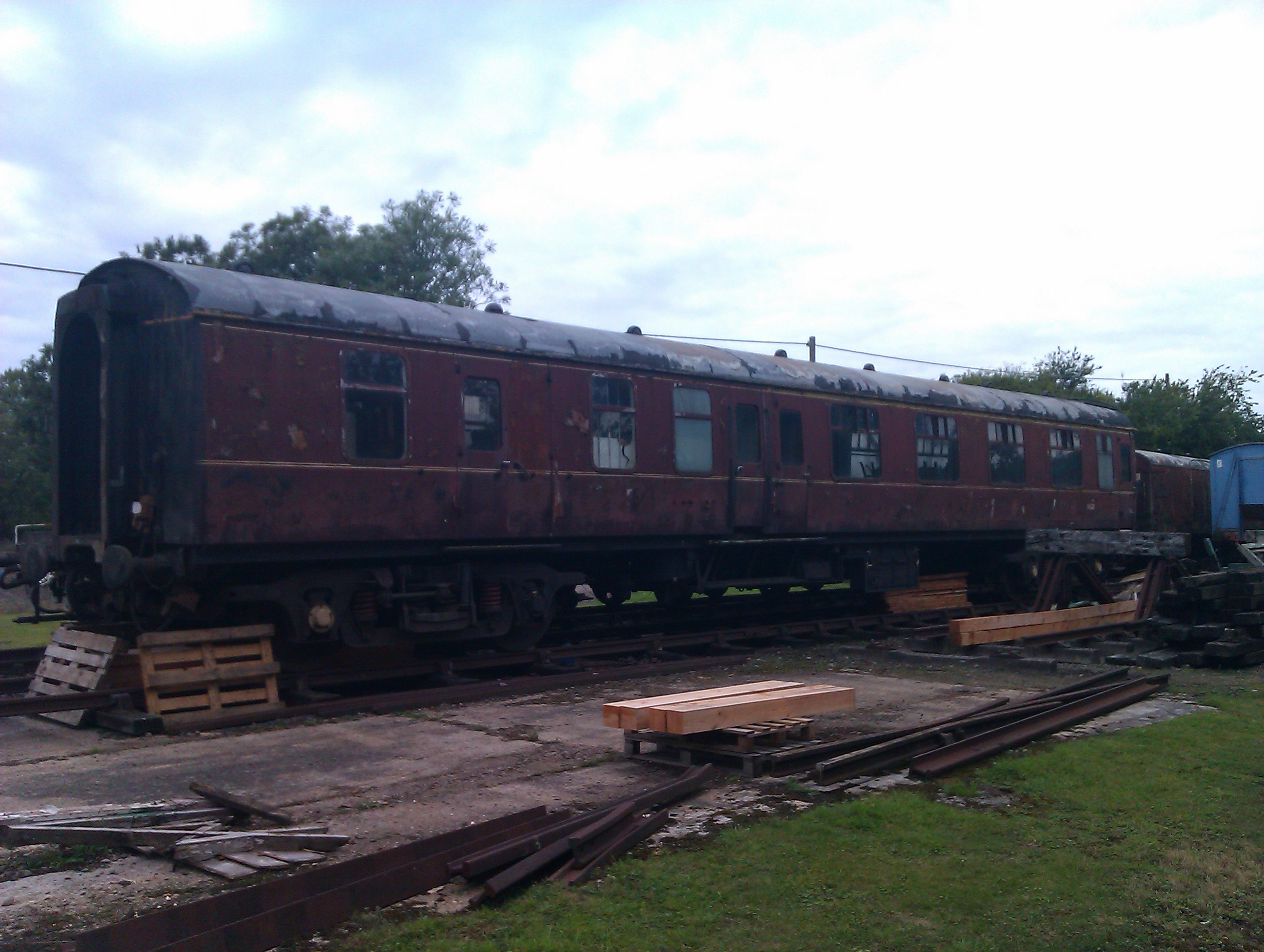
Mk1 coach in Hardingham yard, 2011

Diesel locomotives

- GET 2, Bagnall 0-4-0 diesel hydraulic 8368, formerly "Horsa" at the Nene Valley Railway, built 1962
- GET 8, Rolls-Royce 0-6-0 diesel 10272, formerly LT DL82 on the London Underground, built 1967
- GET 11, Brush Traction 0-6-0 Diesel Electric 804, built for the Tyne & Wear Metro and use in the Channel Tunnel, built 1978

Carriages

- BR 1984 Mk 1 Unclassified Restaurant Car, built 1960
- BR 14021 Mk 1 Brake Corridor First, built 1962 (to North Norfolk Railway, July 2022)
- BR 87616 Blue Spot Four wheel Fish Van, built 1959
- BR 889018 Four-wheel Continental Ferry Van, built 1961
- BR 87602 Blue Spot Four wheel Fish Van, built 1960

Preceding station	Historical railways	Following station
Thuxton; Line and station open	British Rail; Eastern Region; Wymondham to Wells via East Dereham	Kimberley Park; Line and station open
	Future services	
Thuxton	Norfolk Orbital Railway; Mid-Norfolk Railway	Kimberley Park
