= Spooner Row railway station =

Station in Norfolk, England

Spooner Row
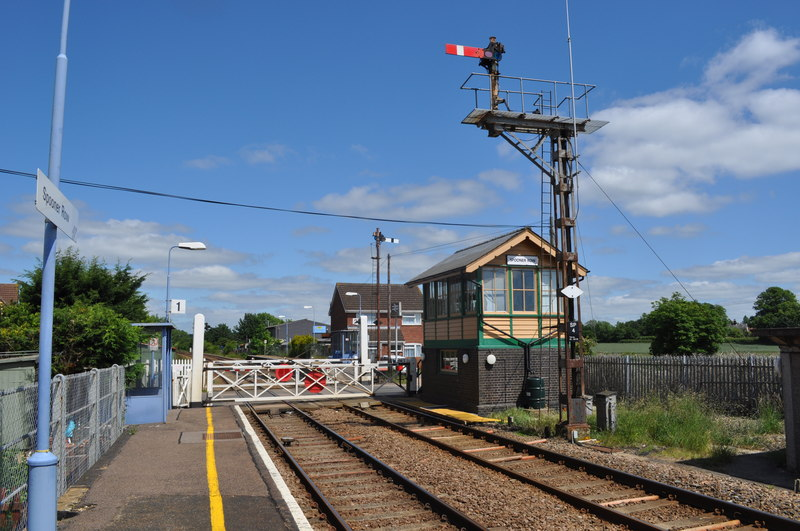
- View of the station in June 2010, before the closure of the signal box, and replacement of the wooden level crossing barriers.

General information
- Location: Spooner Row, South Norfolk; England
- Coordinates: 52.5351°N 1.0860°E
- Grid reference: TM094975
- Manager: Greater Anglia
- Platforms: 2

Other information
- Station code: SPN
- Classification: DfT category F2

Key dates
- 30 July 1845: Opened
- September 1847: Closed
- 1 December 1855: Reopened
- 13 July 1964: Closed to freight

Passengers
- 2021/22: ▲320
- 2022/23: ▲382
- 2023/24: ▲698
- 2024/25: ▼686
- 2025/26: ▲916
Location
Notes
- Passenger statistics from the Office of Rail and Road

Spooner Row railway station is on the Breckland line in the East of England, serving the small village of Spooner Row, Norfolk. The line runs between Cambridge in the west and Norwich in the east.

Spooner Row is situated between Attleborough and Wymondham, 111 miles 27 chains (179.2 km) from London Liverpool Street via Ely. The station is managed by Greater Anglia, which also operates all of the services calling at the station.

It is one of the least-used stations in Norfolk, with just 1,344 passenger entries/exits in 2018/19, according to Office of Rail and Road estimates, though this figure was a marked increase on just 264 passengers six years prior. On weekdays, there are two trains per day to Norwich and two to Cambridge. In 2020/21, there were 74 passengers, which increased to 320 in 2021/22.

== History ==
The Norwich and Brandon Railway Act 1844 (7 & 8 Vict. c. xv) authorising the Norwich and Brandon Railway (N&BR) received royal assent on 10 May 1844. The line was to link with an Eastern Counties Railway (ECR) project of a line from Newport in Essex to Brandon in Suffolk. Once complete, the line would enable trains to travel from Norwich to London. Work started on the line in 1844. The line and its stations were opened on 30 July 1845. Spooner Row station opened with the line and was, as now, situated east of Attleborough station and west of Wymondham station. The line ran from Ely to Trowse, in Norwich. The link into Norwich was delayed due to the need to build a bridge over the River Wensum that kept the river navigable. One month before the N&BR opened, the Norfolk Railway Act 1845 (8 & 9 Vict. c. xli) authorising the amalgamation of the Yarmouth and Norwich Railway with the N&BR came into effect and so Spooner Row station became a Norfolk Railway asset.

The NR closed Spooner Row station in September 1847. In 1848 the NR was absorbed by the Eastern Counties Railway. The ECR reopened Spooner Row station on 1 December 1855. The station closed for a second time on 1 August 1860. The Great Eastern Railway Act 1862 (25 & 26 Vict. c. ccxxiii) was passed on 7 August 1862 authorised the amalgamation the ECR and the Eastern Union Railway, which resulted in the formation of the Great Eastern Railway (GER). Subsequent to this, Spooner Row reopened for the third and final time on 1 March 1882.

The difficult economic circumstances that existed after World War I led the government to pass the Railways Act 1921 which led to the creation of the Big Four. The GER amalgamated with several other companies to create the London and North Eastern Railway (LNER). Spooner Row became an LNER station on 1 January 1923. On nationalisation in 1948 the station and its services came under the management of the Eastern Region of British Railways. The original station buildings were destroyed by fire in the 1970s, although the station features in the British Transport Films Collection DVD (Volume 4), filmed in 1959. Upon privatisation the station and its services were transferred to Central Trains on 2 March 1997. On 1 April 2004 the station and its services were transferred to National Express East Anglia, then known as one. On 5 February 2012 these were transferred to Abellio Greater Anglia.

The original wooden level crossing gates were operated manually from the station's signal box. However, in 2012 the signal box was closed and the crossing gates were renewed with automatic barriers and warning lights. The signal box is due to be relocated to Wymondham Abbey railway station on the heritage Mid-Norfolk Railway.

== Facilities ==
The station is unstaffed. The platforms are staggered on either side of the level crossing, with sheltered seating on both. On the westbound (Cambridge) platform there are unusually two help-points. The eastbound (Norwich) platform is considerably lower in height than is usual on the British railway network.

== Services ==
As of summer 2024, on weekdays there are two trains each morning to Norwich, also calling at Wymondham. There two trains each afternoon to Cambridge, also calling at Attleborough, Thetford, Brandon, Ely and Cambridge North.

On Saturdays, the station is served by one train in each direction, with the Cambridge service extended to Stansted Airport. There is no Sunday service.

Preceding station	National Rail	Following station
Attleborough	Greater Anglia Breckland Line Limited Service	Wymondham
