= Ashwellthorpe railway station =

Former railway station in Norfolk, England

Coordinates: 52.53431°N 1.18332°E

Ashwellthorpe
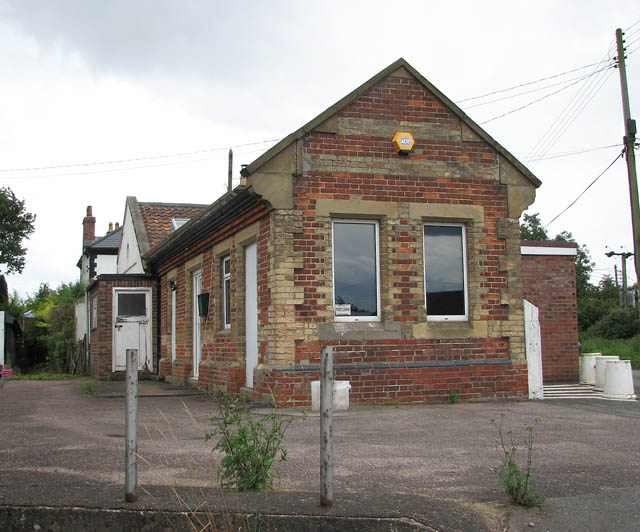

General information
- Location: Ashwellthorpe and Fundenhall, South Norfolk; England
- Grid reference: TM160977
- Platforms: 2

Other information
- Status: Disused

History
- Pre-grouping: Great Eastern Railway
- Post-grouping: London and North Eastern Railway; Eastern Region of British Railways

Key dates
- 2 May 1881: Opened
- 10 September 1939: Closed to passengers
- 4 August 1951: Closed to freight
Location

Ashwellthorpe was a railway station that existed in the village of Ashwellthorpe, Norfolk, on a cutoff line between Forncett and Wymondham. This entry covers the history of the line and the station.

The station and line were opened in 1881, with passenger services withdrawn in 1939 and the line closing in 1951. However, a siding remained at the Wymondham end until 1976.

== Description ==
Ashwellthorpe station was located 2 miles 76 chains (4.7 km) from Forncett station and consisted of two platforms with the main station building which incorporated a two-storey stationmaster's house being located on the down side. This was equipped with a booking office, toilets and a waiting room. A simple shelter was provided on the up platform and the signal box was located to the north of that. Two brick built cottages were also provided and located on the station approach road.

A single siding goods yard was provided.

== History ==
=== Great Eastern Railway (1881-1922) ===
As early as 1853 Peter Bruff surveyed a link between Wymondham and Forncett on the Norwich to Ipswich line for the Eastern Counties Railway but the plans were not developed.

During the 1870s railway companies backed by the Midland Railway and Great Northern Railway alerted the Great Eastern Railway to potential threats to its monopoly in the North Norfolk area. To address this a new line from Wymondham to Forncett was proposed to offer connections via a change at Forncett to the Norwich to Liverpool Street line. Construction started in April 1880 through an area of rolling farmland with a bridge over the River Tas. A year later in April 1881 with the line substantially complete, the contract for building Ashwellthorpe station was awarded to William Bell & Sons for £3,026.

The line opened on 2 May 1881 although improvements at Forncett railway station (a footbridge and locomotive turntable) were not ready in time. The line was built as double track throughout, was 6 miles 16 chains long, and was controlled by three signal boxes (Forncett Junction, Ashwellthorpe and Wymondham North Junction).

In 1882 the 1.50 pm departure from Wells arrived at Forncett at 3.08 pm in time to connect to the up express and arrive in Liverpool Street at 6.00 pm. In the opposite direction, a 5.50 pm departure from Liverpool Street would see an arrival of 9.15 pm.

The line was primarily used for passenger diversions and freight that did not need to be routed via Norwich. However following flooding at Flordon (north of Forncett) in 1912 main line passenger services were diverted via Wymondham (where they would have reversed0 between 26 August and 2 October.

After World War one through trains to Wells ceased and the 1922 showed six trains each way on the line operating Forncett to Wymondham only.

=== London & North Eastern Railway (1923-1948) ===
Following the passing of the Railways Act 1921 on 1 January 1923 the operation of the line and Ashwellthorpe station was taken over by the London and North Eastern Railway (LNER). Rationalisation at Forncett Junction followed with the abolition of the signal box and responsibility transferring to Forncett station signal box.

The July 1939 timetable showed six passenger trains each way along the line on a weekday with the first up and last down operating from/to Dereham. However, the outbreak of World War II saw the passenger service withdrawn on 10 September never to be restored. Goods traffic meanwhile continued with Ashwellthorpe being serviced by a daily freight and a small number of freight trains running over the line. Airfield construction (of RAF Hethel) saw additional construction traffic use the station in 1941–42.

=== British Railways (1948–1951) ===
Following nationalisation in 1948 the station became part of the Eastern Region of British Railways. The passenger service had not been restored after the war and by the July 1950 timetable change the only remaining traffic was the weekday "as required" freight service typically worked by a former GER 0-6-0T. The line was closed in August 1951 although a two-mile stub was retained at the north end to store redundant rolling stock.

In December 1954, the remains of the branch were used to stable the royal train overnight. Norwich based scrap firm A King and Sons took over the site in the 1960s and the site became the final resting place of many locomotives and carriages before closure in early 1976. Wymondham North Junction was removed on 3 August 1976 although the signal box had been closed at an earlier date.

== The site today ==
The station was located off the B1113 road, east of Ashwellthorpe village towards Toprow. The former station site and part of the railway alignment are now used as industrial estate. The former station site and part of the railway alignment are now used as an industrial estate. The former station building has been adapted for use as an office.

== See also ==
- List of closed railway stations in Norfolk
- List of closed railway stations in Britain

Preceding station	Disused railways	Following station
Wymondham	LNER; Wymondham to Forncett, via Ashwellthorpe	Forncett
