= Spooner Row =

Village in Norfolk, England

Coordinates: 52.53411°N 1.08892°E

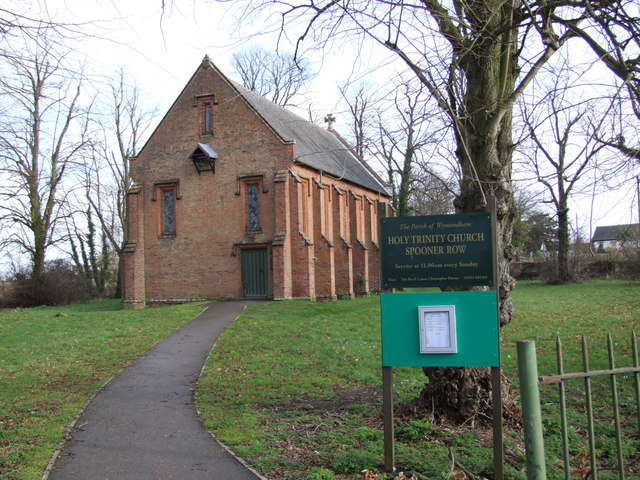
- Holy Trinity Church, Spooner Row

- Location within Norfolk
- OS grid reference: TM 096 974
- Civil parish: Spooner Row
- District: South Norfolk
- Shire county: Norfolk
- Region: East
- Country: England
- Sovereign state: United Kingdom
- Post town: Wymondham
- Postcode district: NR18
- Dialling code: 01953

Spooner Row is a small village and civil parish in the English county of Norfolk. It is situated some 3 mi (4.8 km) south-west of the town of Wymondham and 12 mi (19 km) south-west of the city of Norwich. The village was within the civil parish of Wymondham before separating on 1 April 2019.

Spooner Row railway station, in the village, is served by local services operated by Greater Anglia on the Breckland Line from Norwich to Cambridge. However, weekday services are limited to two morning trains to Norwich and two late afternoon trains to Cambridge. On Saturdays, there is only one train to Norwich and the westbound service is extended to Stansted Airport. There is no Sunday service. The station is a request stop.
