= Wymondham Abbey railway station =

Heritage railway station in Norfolk, England

Wymondham Abbey
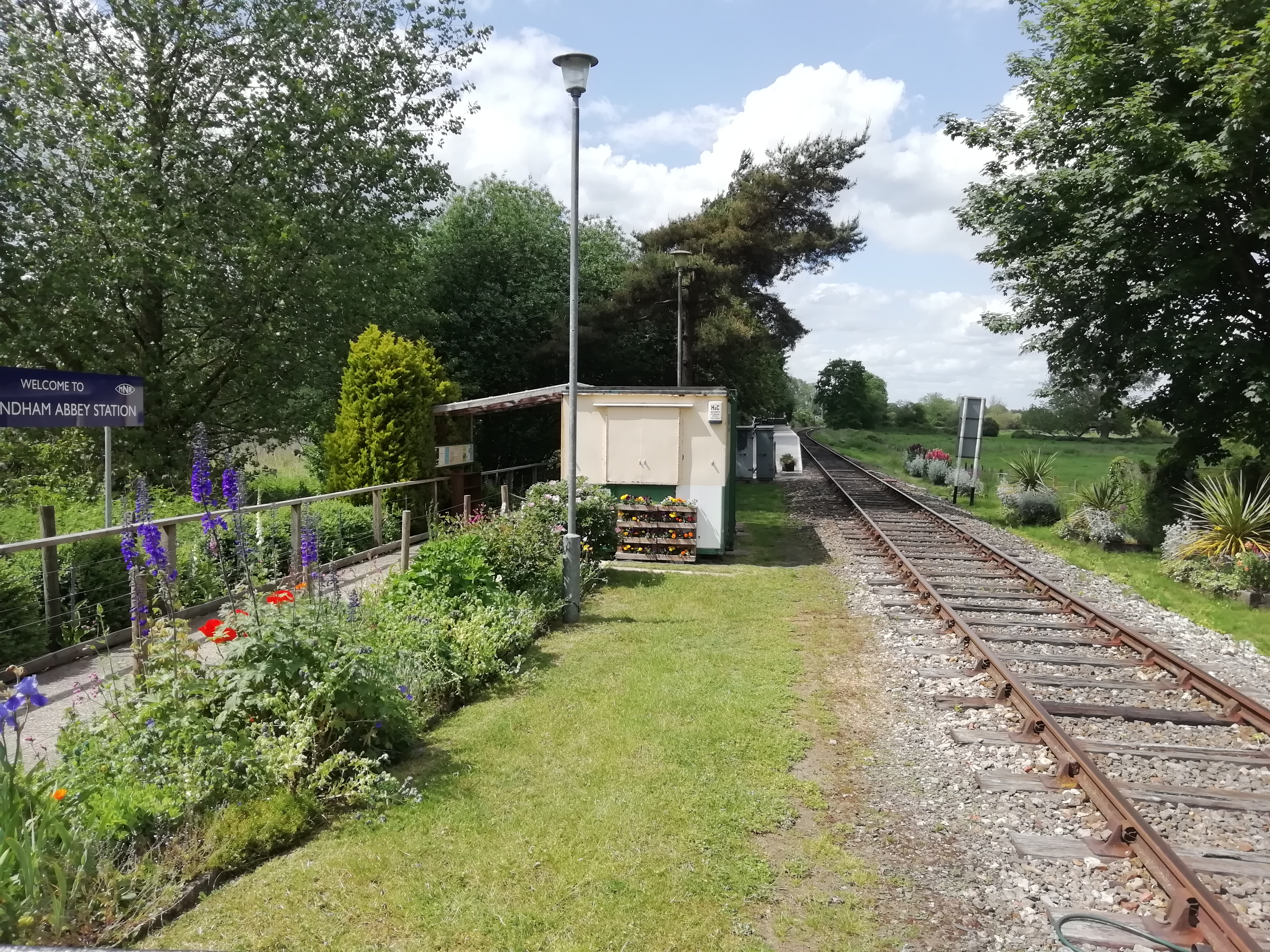
- Wymondham Abbey station in 2019

General information
- Location: Wymondham, South Norfolk; England
- Coordinates: 52.57°N 1.104°E
- Grid reference: TG104014
- System: Station on heritage railway
- Owner: Mid-Norfolk Railway
- Platforms: 1

Key dates
- 8 May 1999: opened
Location

Wymondham Abbey is a railway station in the town of Wymondham in the English county of Norfolk. The station is served by heritage services operated by the Mid-Norfolk Railway (MNR) between Wymondham and East Dereham.

== History ==
There was historically no station on the exact site now occupied by Wymondham Abbey, although it stands close to the site of the sidings for the Briton's Brush Works, which operated from 1890 to 1985. Access to the sidings was controlled by Church Lane signal box, the remains of which still being visible at the site.

A short-lived station was located on the far side of the level crossing to the current platform, with footings for it being discovered during ground works for a new signal box.

== Present day ==
The current Wymondham Abbey railway station, opened in 1999, is the current southern terminus of passenger services on the MNR, although the line continues beyond Wymondham Abbey to a junction with the Breckland Line at Wymondham railway station. The line between Wymondham Abbey and the Breckland Line is used for stock movements, freight and works trains, for the reversal of the majority of hauled passenger trains and, during special events, timetabled passenger services as far as the operational boundary with Network Rail.

There is minimal car parking at this station; visitors are therefore advised to use parking facilities in Wymondham town centre or the car park at Dereham.

== Signal box ==
The original Church Lane signal box footings survive, but are not located in a suitable location for current needs. A replacement box, using the signal box cabin from Spooner Row station, has been constructed beside the level crossing, on the northern end of the original station platform.

== Route ==
Preceding station	Heritage railways	Following station
Kimberley Park towards Dereham	Mid-Norfolk Railway	Terminus
Proposed extension
Kimberley Park towards Dereham	Mid-Norfolk Railway	Wymondham Junction Terminus
Proposed service
Kimberley Park	Norfolk Orbital Railway; Mid-Norfolk Railway	Wymondham
