= Forncett railway station =

Former railway station in South Norfolk, England

Coordinates: 52.4963°N 1.1990°E

Forncett
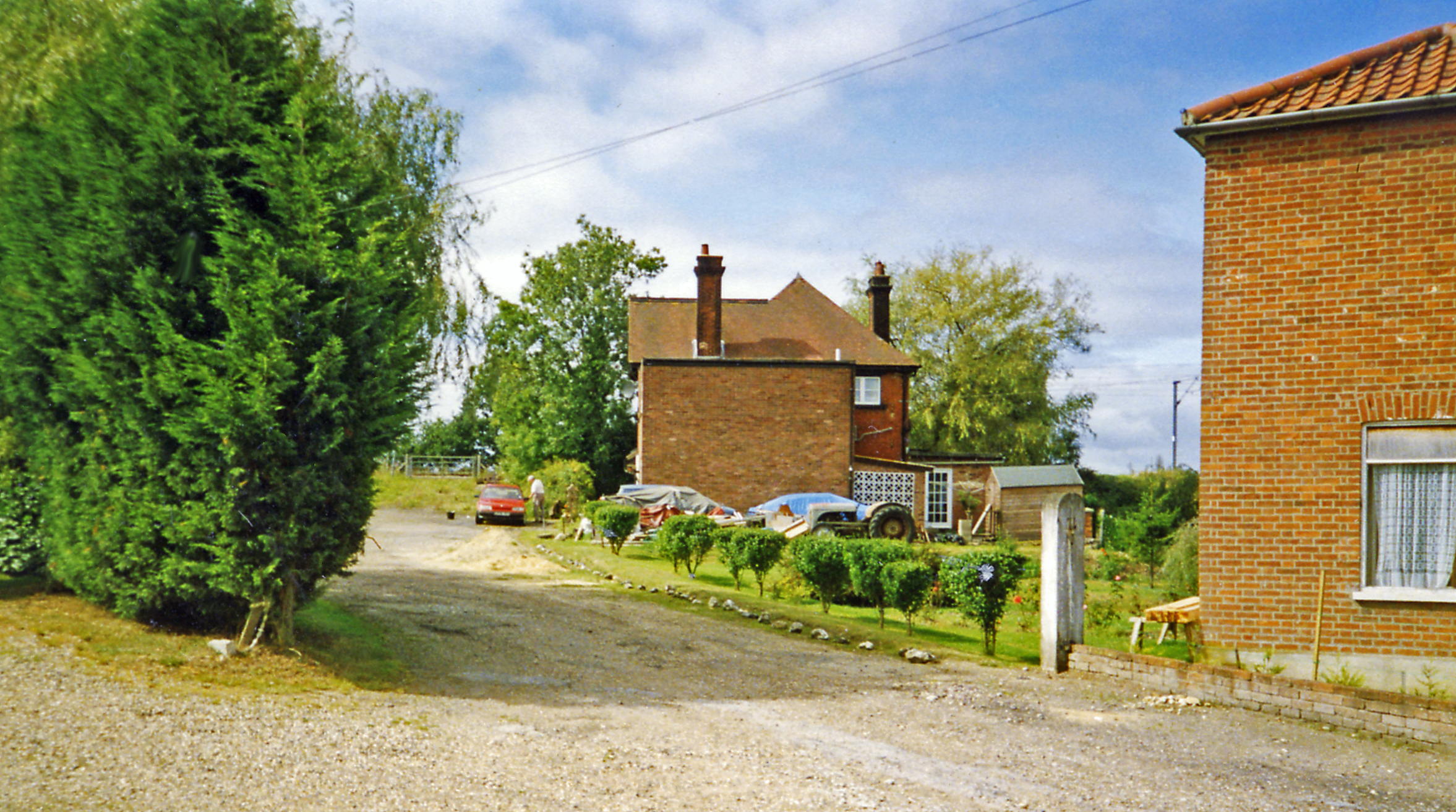
- Remains of the station in 1993

General information
- Location: Forncett, District of South Norfolk; England
- Grid reference: TM17259350
- Platforms: 2

Other information
- Status: Disused

History
- Pre-grouping: Eastern Union Railway; Great Eastern Railway
- Post-grouping: London and North Eastern Railway; Eastern Region of British Railways

Key dates
- 12 December 1849: Opened
- 28 December 1964: Closed to freight
- 7 November 1966: Closed to passengers
Location

Forncett railway station was a railway station in Forncett, South Norfolk located 104 miles (167 km) from London Liverpool Street. It was opened in 1849 when Norwich and Ipswich were connected by the Eastern Union Railway in 1849. Between 1881 and 1951 it was a junction for a short route to Wymondham and was closed as a result of the Beeching Axe with other smaller stations between Norwich and Ipswich.

== Description (post 1881) ==
The station consisted of two platforms with the up (to London) platform being 363 feet (111 m) and the down (from London) platform 452 feet (138 m). The station building was situated on the up side with a wooden waiting shelter located on the down. The two platforms were linked by a footbridge provided in 1882. A goods yard consisting of three sidings and a brick goods shed was located south of the station on the up side.

Long refuge sidings were provided north of the station with a 44-foot turntable being provided on the up side in 1881 in connection with the line to Wymondham.

The station signal box was located at the north end of the down platform. A short distance to the north a second signal box called Forncett Junction was located controlling access to and from the Wymondham line some 30 chains (600 m) to the north.

== History ==
=== Opening and early years (1849-1862) ===
Forncett station was opened on 7 November 1849 by the Eastern Union Railway although regular services did not commence until 12 December that year. The opening of the line meant that London Liverpool Street and Norwich (Victoria) were linked although the Eastern Counties Railway (ECR) operated the line as far as Colchester and the EUR between Colchester and Norwich. The ECR already operated the Norwich to London via Thetford and Cambridge route at this date.

The EUR was taken over by the Eastern Counties Railway in 1854. However, by the 1860s the railways in East Anglia were in financial trouble, and most were leased to the ECR. It wished to amalgamate formally but could not obtain government agreement for this until 1862, when the Great Eastern Railway (GER) was formed by the amalgamation.

=== Great Eastern Railway (1862-1922) ===
The Great Eastern Railway opened the Wymondham – Forncett line on 7 May 1881 and facilities such as the turntable (diameter 44 feet 9 inches) and footbridge were added at this time. The intention was to give the line from Wells-next-the-Sea a connection into Norwich to Liverpool Street trains at Forncett and vice versa. For example, in 1882 the 1.50 pm departure from Wells arrived at Forncett at 3.08 pm in time to connect to the up express and arrive in Liverpool Street at 6.00 pm.

In 1892 a locomotive inspection pit was added.

On 22 February 1908 a violent storm partially wrecked the down timber built platform.

Heavy flooding on 26 August 1912 saw the main line north of Forncett Junction closed with trains diverted via Wymondham. Damage to several bridges saw the diversions continue until 2 October.

Although there was no engine shed as such Forncett had, in 1917 two drivers and a fireman for local workings. No locomotive was allocated and it is likely these would have come from Norwich engine shed.

In the final year of GER operation, there were no through trains from Wells to Forncett although a branch service of six trains per day operated to Wymondham.

=== London & North Eastern Railway (1923-1948) ===
Following the passing of the Railways Act 1921 on 1 January 1923 the operation of Forncett station was taken over by the London and North Eastern Railway (LNER).

In 1925 the LNER closed Forncett Junction signal box transferring its signalling responsibilities to the station signal box.

Passenger services were withdrawn from the Forncett - Wymondham line on 11 September 1939 as a wartime economy measure. This line saw some additional traffic during the World War II but at one stage one of the running lines was being used as a siding for damaged rolling stock.

=== British Railways (1948-1966) ===
Following nationalisation in 1948 the station became part of the Eastern Region of British Railways. The passenger service towards Wymondham had not been restored after the war and by the July 1950 timetable change there was no traffic at all and the line was closed in August 1951.

Freight, which for many years during the 1950s consisted of a daily pick-up freight train between Norwich and Stowmarket, was finally withdrawn on 28 December 1964.

The last passenger trains called on 5 November 1966 when the Ipswich to Norwich stopping service was withdrawn.

=== Since closure ===
The line to Norwich remains in operational use and was electrified in May 1987.

The station was in the news in July 2012 when the body of a woman who had died after being hit by a train was found at the site.

Preceding station	Disused railways	Following station
Flordon; Line open, station closed	Great Eastern Railway; Great Eastern Main Line	Tivetshall; Line open, station closed
Ashwellthorpe; Line and station closed	Great Eastern Railway; Great Eastern Main Line	Tivetshall; Line open, station closed
