= Dereham railway station =

Heritage railway station in Norfolk, England

Dereham
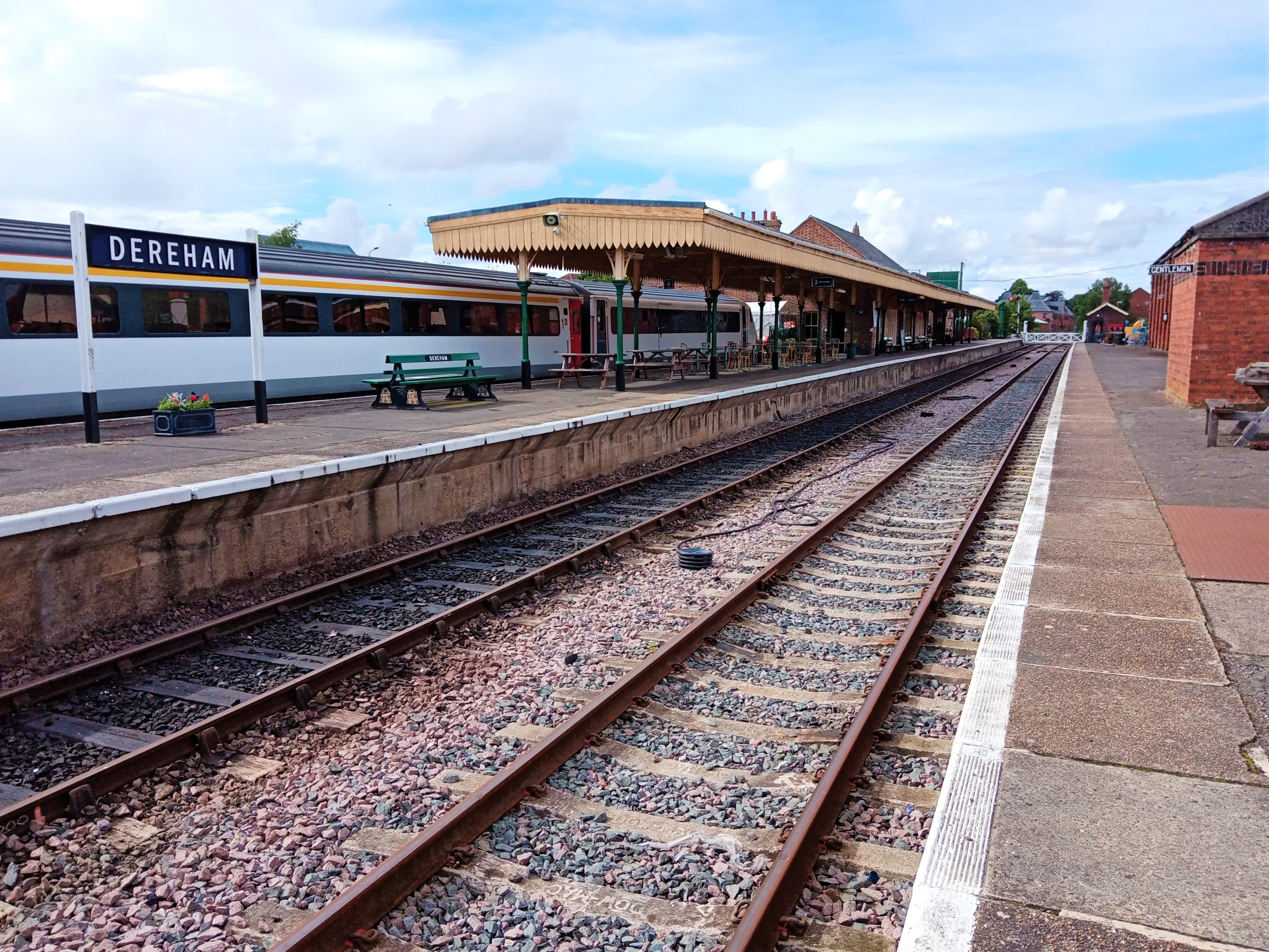
- Dereham station's main building and canopy

General information
- Location: Dereham, Breckland; England
- Coordinates: 52.6789°N 0.9474°E
- Grid reference: TF993130
- System: Station on heritage railway
- Operator: Mid-Norfolk Railway
- Platforms: 4 (3 in use)

Other information
- Station code: DERMUKF

History
- Original company: Norfolk Railway
- Pre-grouping: Great Eastern Railway
- Post-grouping: London & North Eastern Railway; Eastern Region of British Railways

Key dates
- 15 February 1847: Opened
- 6 October 1969: Closed to passengers
- 12 September 1984: Closed as a coal depot
- 26 July 1997: Reopened
Location

Dereham railway station is currently the northern terminus of the Mid-Norfolk Railway, a heritage line that operates services to Wymondham Abbey. It is located in the town of Dereham, in the English county of Norfolk.

== History ==
The Lynn and Dereham Railway and the Norfolk Railway both obtained Parliament's permission to build lines to Dereham in 1845, at the height of the so-called Railway Mania, when railways were being built across the whole country. The Norfolk Railway, building its line from Wymondham, reached Dereham first and opened its railway to passengers on 15 February 1847. The line from King's Lynn had to wait until 11 September 1848, when the Lynn & Dereham Railway built its own terminal station just before the junction with the Norfolk Railway. This station was closed in 1850, when trains were extended to the Norfolk Railway station.

The King's Lynn line was originally operated by the Lynn & Dereham Railway but, in 1848, the Eastern Counties Railway leased the Norfolk Railway the line was absorbed. In 1857, the line between Dereham and Wells opened. The entire line became part of the Great Eastern Railway in 1862.

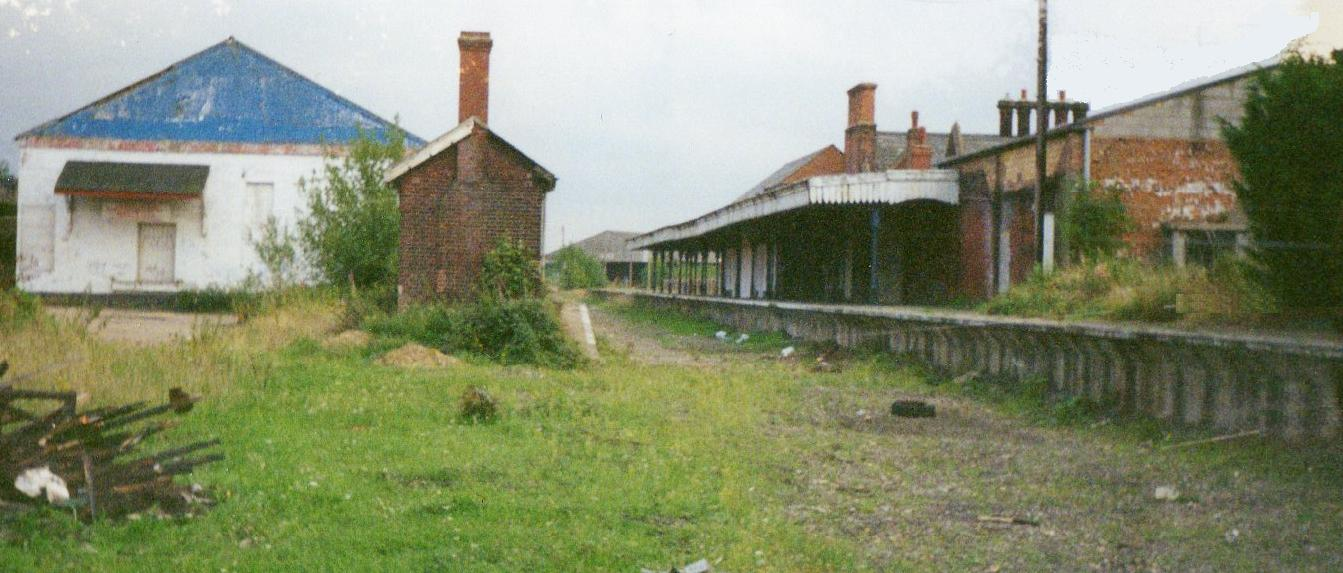
Derelict remains of Dereham station in 1990.

The station was built in stages, being expanded over several decades. It had four platforms, with platforms 2 and 3 being set back to back; platform 4 is a short bay and was originally dedicated for trains heading towards King's Lynn.

Beeching's report recommended the retention of the King's Lynn - Dereham - Norwich line for express trains and freight; however, the line from King's Lynn was closed in 1968, leaving a Dereham - Norwich service. After withdrawal of this remaining service in 1969, the station building was gutted and used as a showroom. Freight trains continued to pass through the station to North Elmham until 1989; passenger services from Dereham to Wells-next-the-Sea had closed under the Beeching Axe in 1964.

The building was later gutted in a serious fire. The exterior has since been restored and the interior replaced, with the building reopening to the public in December 2005.

=== Locomotive depot ===
By 1880, Dereham boasted a two road wooden locomotive shed and a 45-foot turntable; it was believed to have dated from the late 1860s and known to have replaced an earlier structure. The depot operated as an outstation of Norwich. In 1888, three locomotives were based at the depot. In 1926, the engine shed was rebuilt in brick.

Dereham depot was closed as a steam shed on 19 September 1955, when DMU stock was introduced to the line. The shed was used to stable DMU stock until 1 September 1968. The shed was later demolished and the site used for the construction of a rail-served fertilizer depot; this has since been demolished and the site is now the Dereham Leisure Centre.

A replacement depot, on part of the former goods yard, was developed using a £100,000 grant from the European Union Leader Fund's Wensum and Coast Local Area Group. In early 2020, the shed was used as an unloading point for MOD traffic.

== Present day ==
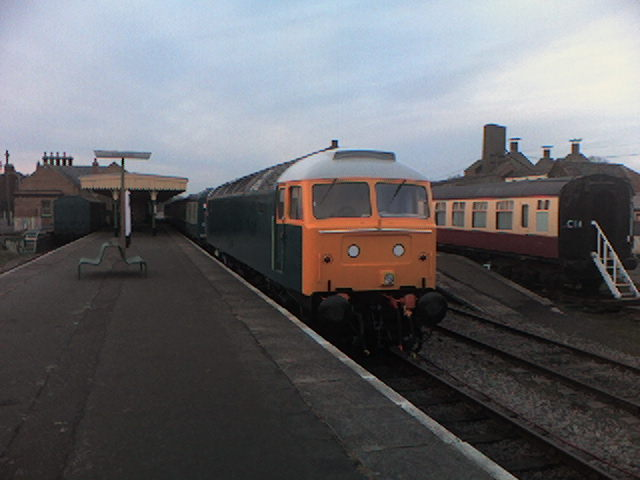
Hauled service at Dereham station

The station was reopened in 1997 by the Mid-Norfolk Railway Preservation Trust who since then have gradually reopened the line to Wymondham. Work is in progress in reopening the line northwards from Dereham towards County School and Fakenham. Although National Rail passenger services do not operate from the station this has been proposed for the future as part of the wider Norfolk Orbital Railway scheme, and the station presently serves periodically as a National Rail freight terminal and charter destination.

The goods shed is used for restoration and storage at the moment. The Great Eastern Railway stables are unique but derelict. It is hoped a grant can be obtained in the future for restoration of this building.

The footbridge formerly from Whittlesford station was delivered to Dereham in July 2010, where it was intended to serve as a replacement to the demolished original structure. In May 2013 a planning application was submitted to Breckland District Council for the construction of the footbridge to link platforms 1 and 2. The bridge has since been sold.

== Second station ==
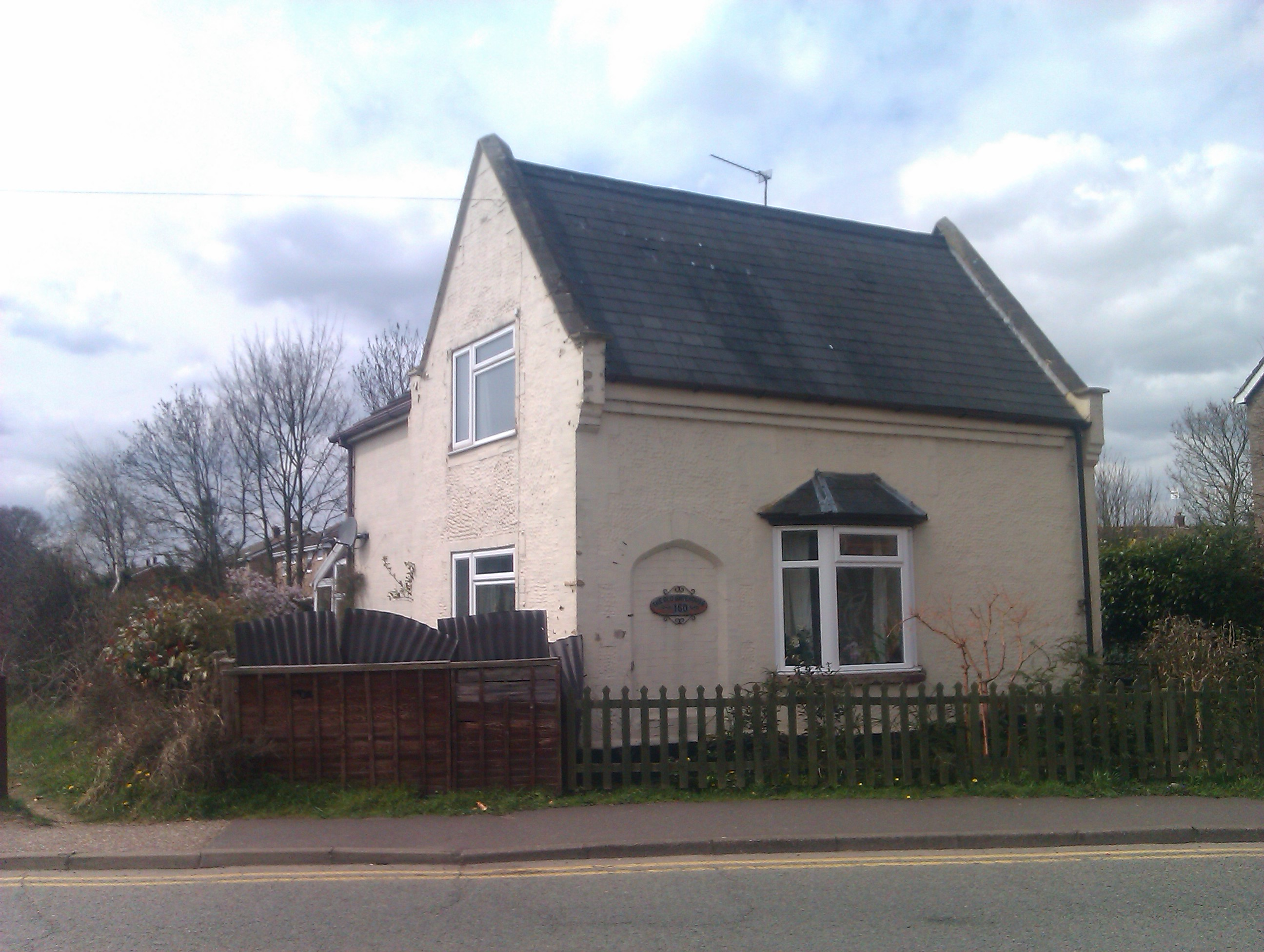
A contender for Dereham's second station

Early Ordnance Survey maps show a second railway station located in the South Green area of Dereham on the branch line to King's Lynn which opened on 11 September 1848. This line was originally provided with a number of stations that lasted less than a decade, and this second station does not appear in later documents and closed around 1850.

A crossing keeper's cottage, which survived the closure of the branch to become a private residence, matches the design of other minor stations along the route. The entrance to the booking hall and former platform door, now converted to be windows, can be seen and compared to contemporary station buildings. However, contrary evidence suggests that the station may have been provided at the level crossing closer to the station, where there were later sidings on a section of line with a tight radius curve.

== Signal boxes ==
Although the original four signal boxes at Dereham have been demolished, two of the boxes have been rebuilt since the preservation of the site. The original Dereham North box is preserved close to the village of Hindolveston.

Location	Original location	Built by	Notes	Photograph
Dereham North	Laundry Lane, Lowestoft	Norfolk and Suffolk Joint Railway	Crossing box for Norwich Road, Dereham. Construction commenced May 2007.	
Dereham Central	Stratford Southern, London	Great Eastern Railway	As Stratford Southern, this box was originally supported on legs, allowing a siding to pass underneath. It has been rebuilt in a more conventional manner. May serve as the main station box when completed.	

== Trains at Dereham ==
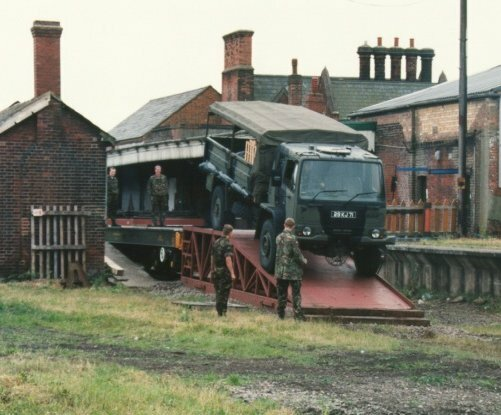
A British Army Leyland DAF T244 unloading at Dereham before restoration

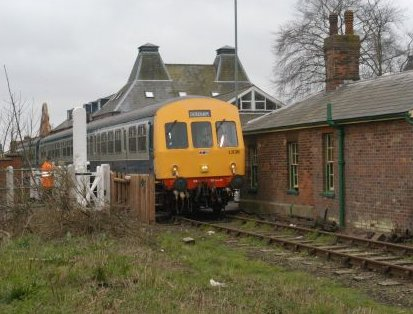
Class 101 DMU crossing Neatherd Road north of Dereham station

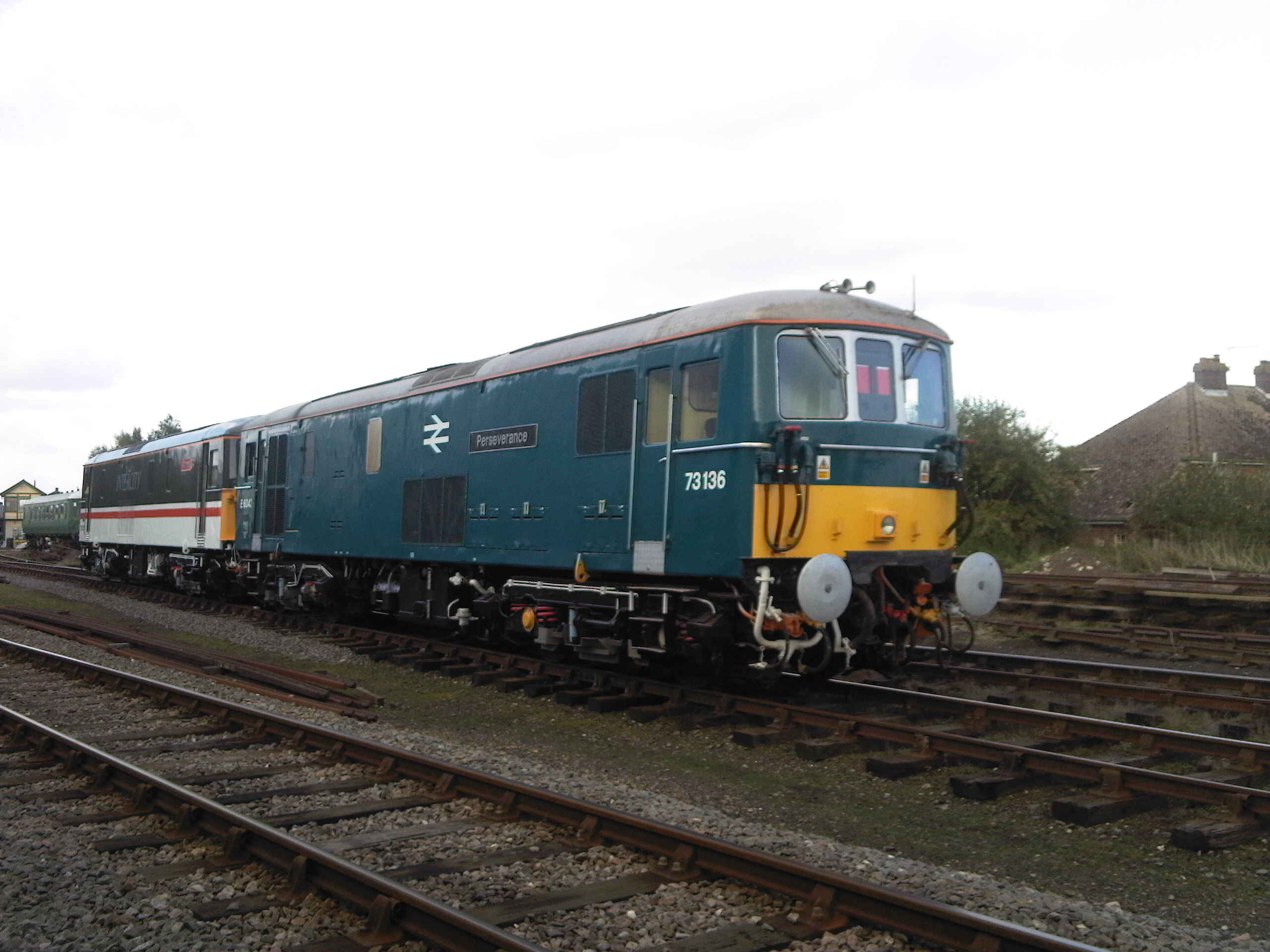
Class 73s in Dereham yard

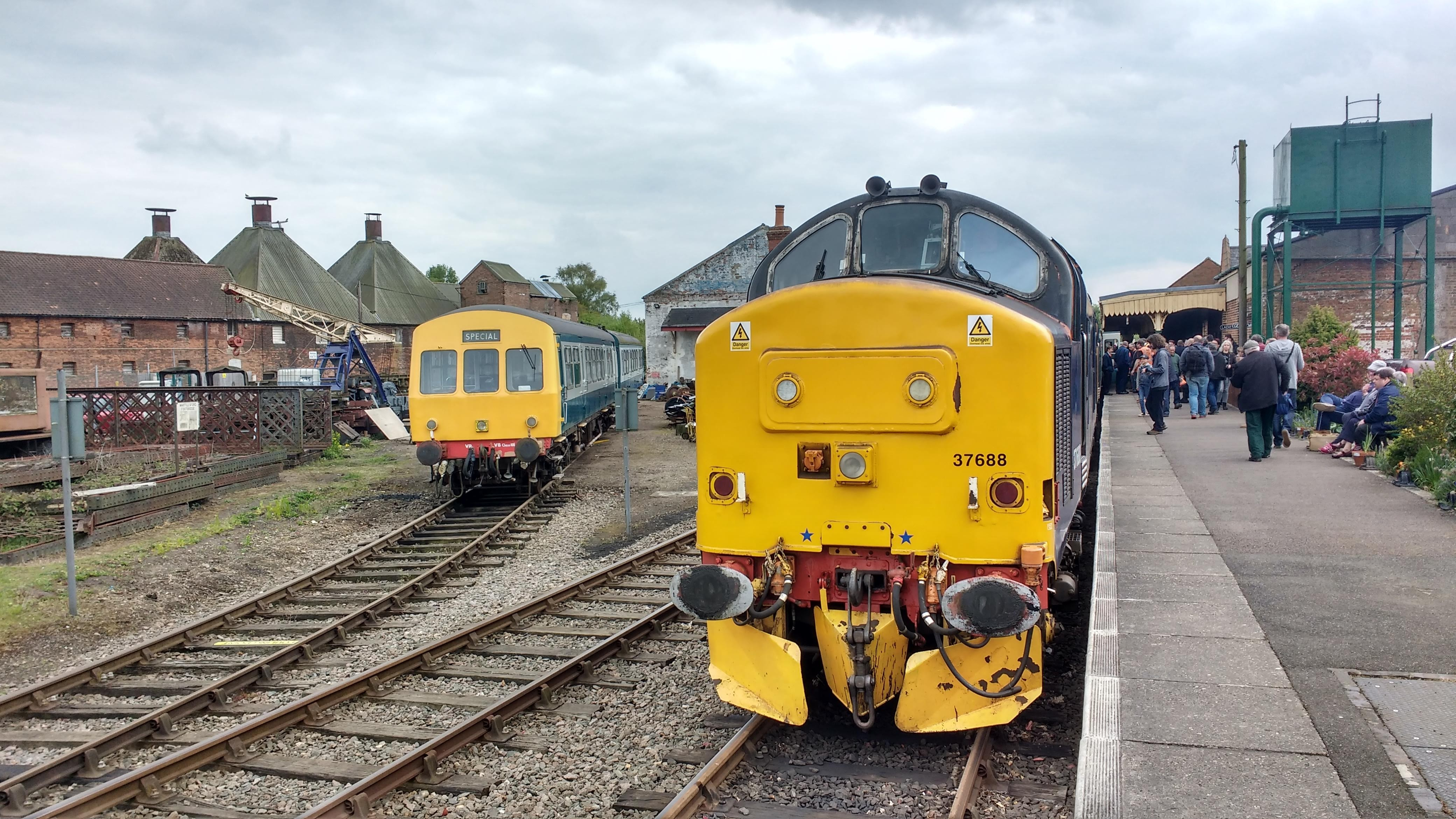
Classes 37 and 101

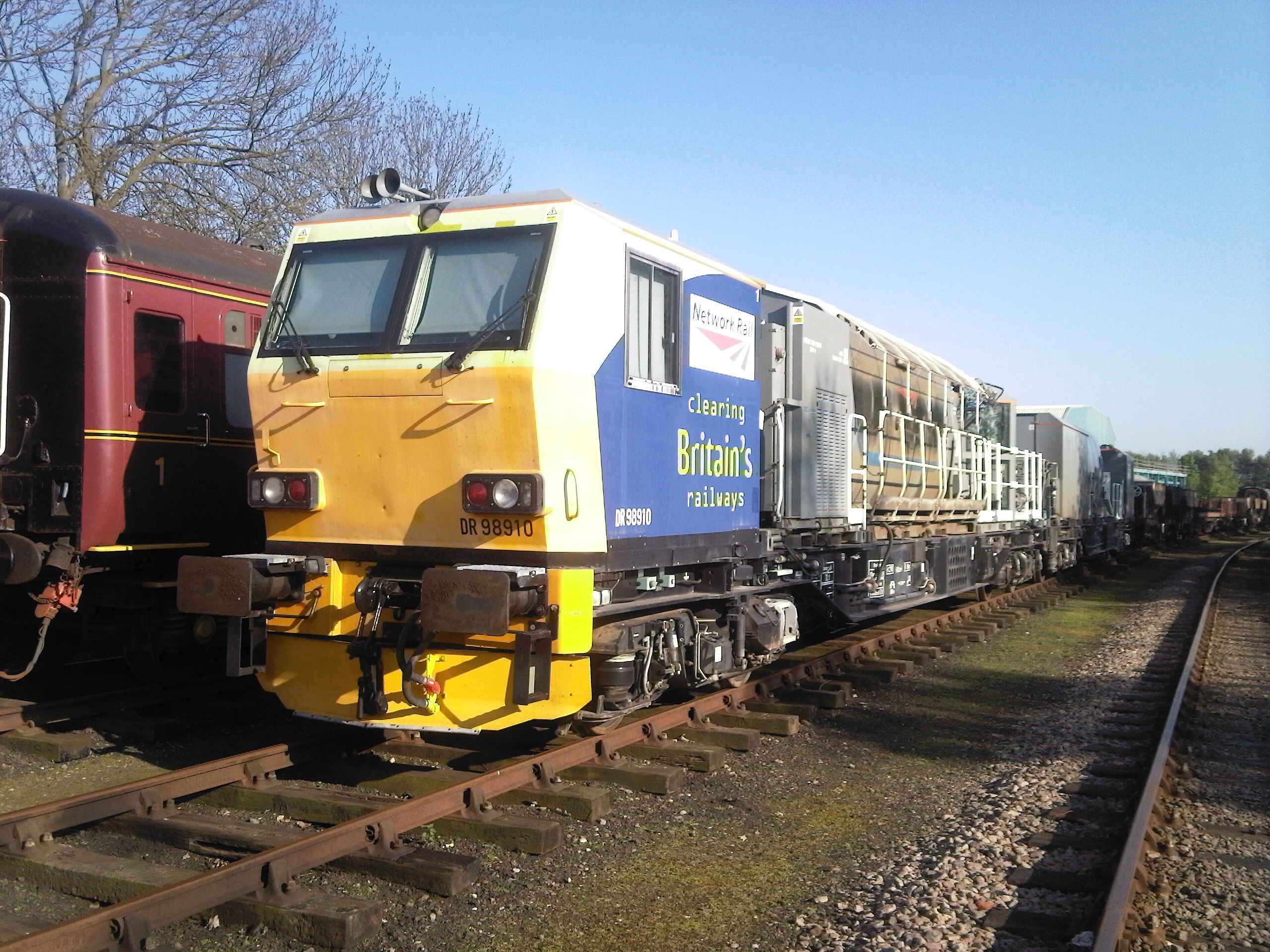
Main line equipment serviced at Dereham

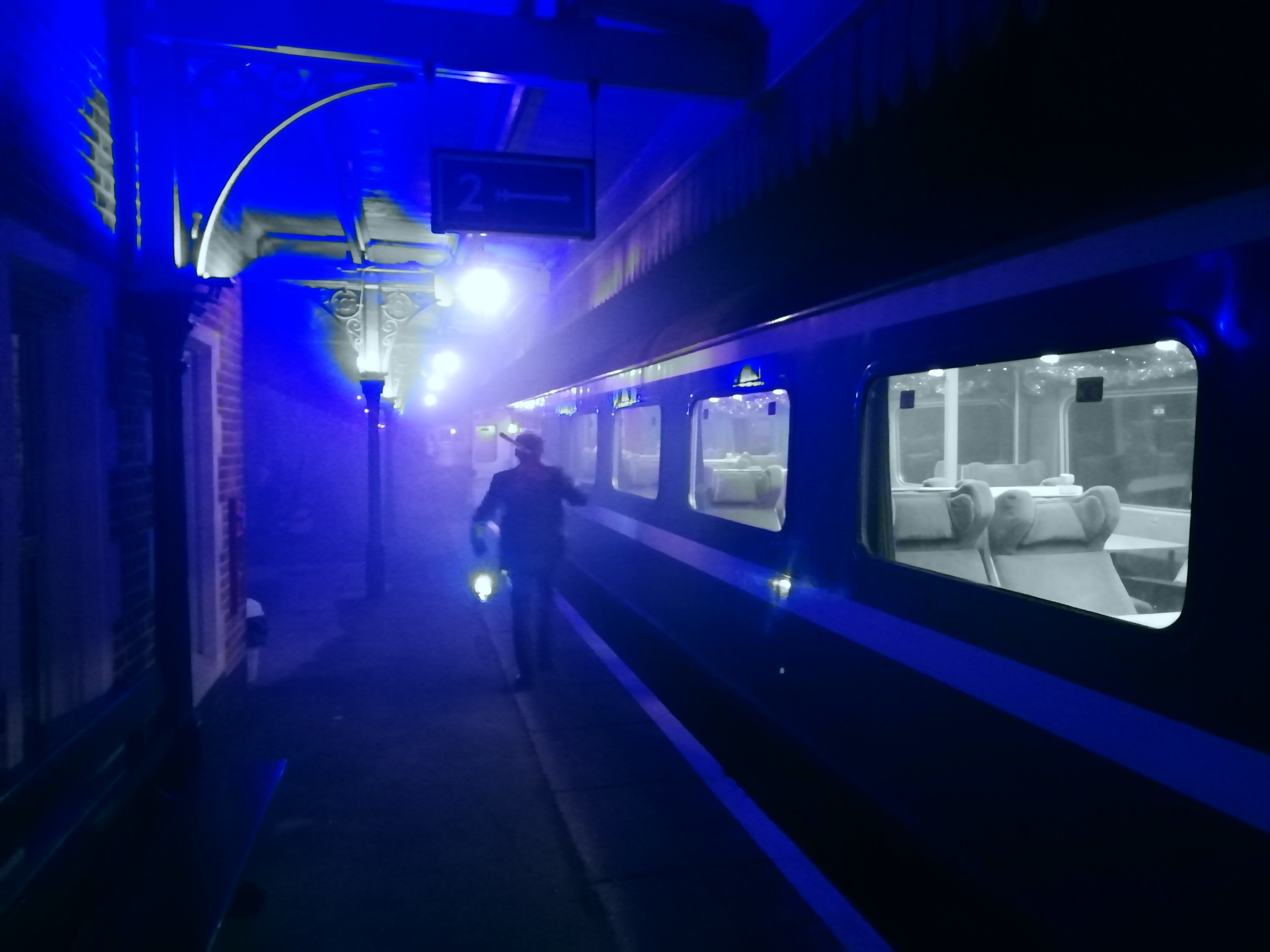
The Polar Express at Dereham

Preceding station	Heritage railways	Following station
Terminus	Mid-Norfolk Railway	Yaxham towards Wymondham Abbey
Proposed extension
North Elmham towards Ryburgh	Mid-Norfolk Railway	Yaxham towards Wymondham Abbey
Disused railways
North Elmham; Line open, station closed	British Rail; Eastern Region; Wymondham to Wells via East Dereham	Yaxham; Line and station open
Scarning; Line and station closed	British Rail; Eastern Region; Lynn and Dereham Railway	Terminus
Proposed service
North Elmham	Norfolk Orbital Railway; Mid-Norfolk Railway	Yaxham
