= Seven Hills Halt railway station =

Railway station in Ingham, United Kingdom

Coordinates: 52.3339°N 0.7257°E

Seven Hills Halt

General information
- Location: Ingham, West Suffolk; England
- Platforms: 1

Other information
- Status: Disused

History
- Original company: Great Eastern Railway
- Pre-grouping: Great Eastern Railway
- Post-grouping: London and North Eastern Railway

Key dates
- 20 December 1922: Station opened
- 8 June 1953: Station closed
Location

Seven Hills Halt railway station was a railway station in Suffolk, England on the branch line between Thetford and Bury St Edmunds. It was closed in 1953, along with the rest of the branch.

== History ==
The railway line between Bury St Edmunds and Thetford was proposed by the Bury St Edmunds and Thetford Railway (B&TR) and authorised on 5 July 1865; but the company had problems in raising the necessary money. After assistance was given by the Thetford and Watton Railway (T&WR), the plan was modified, and instead of running to the main station at Thetford, a curve was built so that T&WR trains from Swaffham could run directly to the Bury St Edmunds line without reversing at Thetford. The B&TR line between Bury St Edmunds and Thetford Bridge was opened on 1 March 1876. The B&TR was purchased by the Great Eastern Railway (GER) in 1878.

Trains on the B&TR were operated by the T&WR until 1879, when operation was taken over by the GER; after this, trains from Bury began to run to Thetford; the east to south curve at Thetford Bridge was not used after 1880. Thetford Bridge was then the last station before Thetford.

Former Services

Preceding station	Disused railways	Following station
Barnham	Great Eastern Railway; Thetford-Bury St Edmunds Line	Ingham
