= Holme Hale =

Village in Norfolk, England

Coordinates: 52.63019°N 0.78264°E

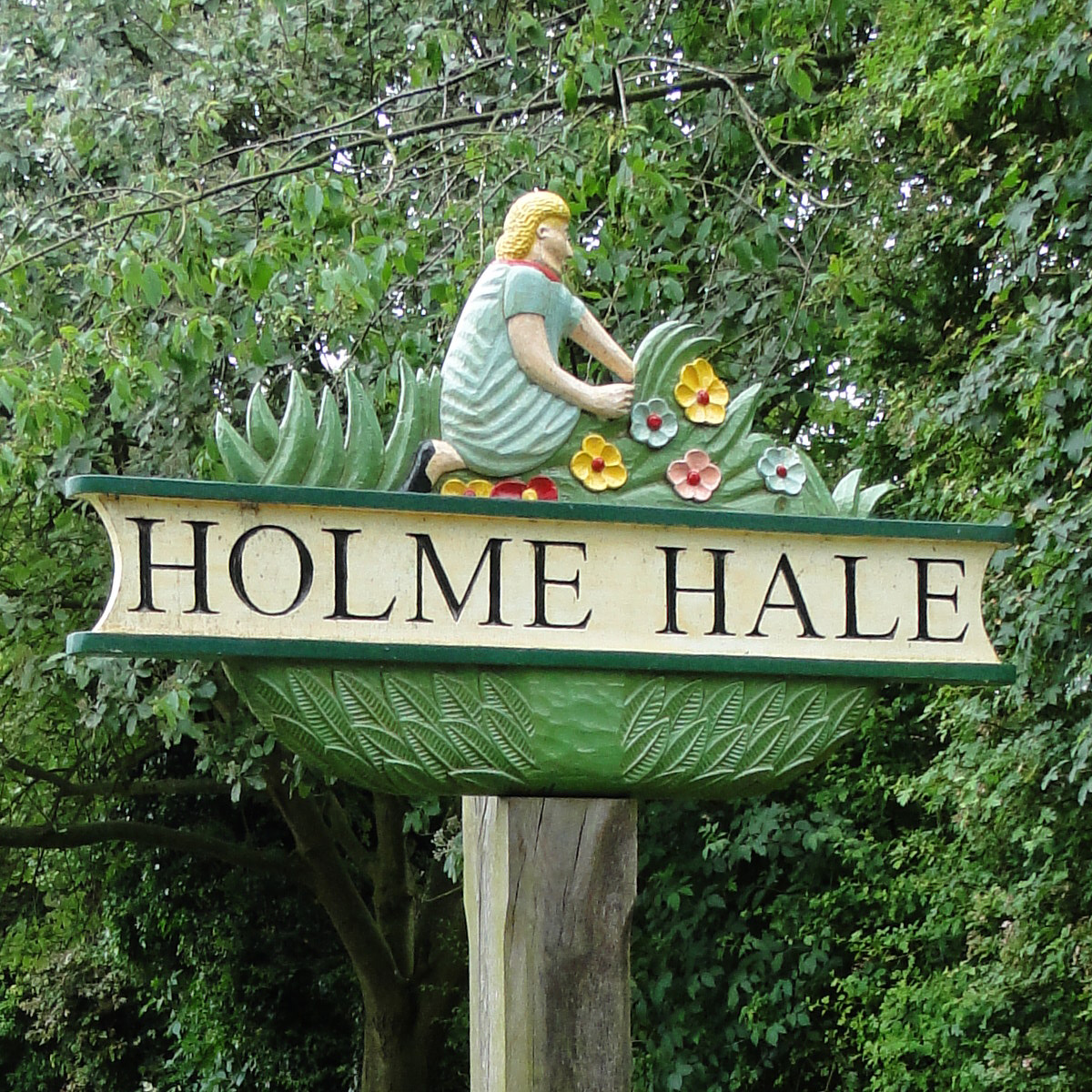
- Holme Hale Village Sign

- Location within Norfolk
- Area: 4.13 sq mi (10.7 km^{2})
- Population: 525 (2021 census)
  - Density: 127/sq mi (49/km^{2})
- OS grid reference: TF88420724
- District: Breckland
- Shire county: Norfolk
- Region: East
- Country: England
- Sovereign state: United Kingdom
- Post town: THETFORD
- Postcode district: IP25
- Dialling code: 01760
- UK Parliament: South West Norfolk

Holme Hale is a village and civil parish in the English county of Norfolk.

Holme Hale is located 5.5 miles (8.9 km) east of Swaffham and 21 miles (34 km) west of Norwich.

== Correct pronunciation ==
"Hoom Hale"

== History ==
Holme Hale's name is of Anglo-Saxon and Viking origin and derives from an amalgamation of the Old English and the Old Norse for the island and the nook of land.

In the Domesday Book, Holme Hale is listed as a settlement of 5 households in the hundred of South Greenhoe. In 1086, the village was divided between the East Anglian estates of King William I and Ralph de Tosny.

Bury's Hall was built in the parish in the Sixteenth Century and later expanded in later centuries. The building is the scene of a reported haunting of a priest who was murdered by Roundheads during the English Civil War.

From 1795, Stephen Watson's gibbet was located on common land between West Bradenham and Holme Hale. This remained hanging until at least October 1837, being the last gibbet to stand in Norfolk, and was at some point after this buried; it was discovered like this by H. Rider Haggard in 1899 and given to Norwich Castle Museum.

Holme Hale Railway Station opened in 1875 as a stop on the Watton and Swaffham Railway. The station closed in 1964 to both passengers and freight.

== Geography ==
According to the 2021 census, Holme Hale has a population of 525 people which shows an increase from the 494 people recorded in the 2011 census.

== St. Andrew's Church ==
Holme Hale's parish church is dedicated to Saint Andrew and dates from the Fourteenth Century. St. Andrew's is located on Church Road and has been Grade I listed since 1960. The church holds Sunday service twice a month and is part of the Necton Benefice.

St. Andrew's has had a bat problem in recent years but holds some interesting carved wooden pew ends. The church also holds a stained-glass window depicting the crucifixion designed by James Powell and Sons.

== Governance ==
Holme Hale is part of the electoral ward of Necton for local elections and is part of the district of Breckland.

The village's national constituency is South West Norfolk which has been represented by Labour's Terry Jermy MP since 2024.

== War Memorial ==
Holme Hale War Memorial is a wheelheaded cross in St. Andrew's Churchyard which lists the following names for the First World War:

| Rank | Name | Unit | Date of death | Burial/Commemoration |
|---|---|---|---|---|
| Sgt. | Arthur J. Smith | 2nd Bn., Australian Imperial Force | 19 May 1915 | Lone Pine Memorial |
| Sjt. | Charles Dixon | 35th Coy., Machine Gun Corps | 10 Dec. 1918 | Terlincthun Cemetery |
| St1C | Charles Sturman | HMS Zealandia (Battleship) | 1 Jun. 1918 | St. Andrew's Churchyard |
| Pte. | Robert F. Eagle | Army Veterinary Corps | 15 May 1917 | All Saints' Churchyard |
| Pte. | William A. J. Copsey | 85th (NS Highlanders) Bn., CEF | 30 Oct. 1917 | Menin Gate |
| Pte. | Albert Eagle | 5th Bn., Norfolk Regiment | 6 Nov. 1918 | Hadra War Cemetery |
| Pte. | Sidney E. Eagle | 5th Bn., Norfolk Regt. | 19 Apr. 1917 | Gaza War Cemetery |
| Pte. | Louis C. Heyhoe | 8th Bn., Norfolk Regt. | 26 Oct. 1917 | Dozinghem Cemetery |
| Pte. | Reginald R. Thurrell | Norfolk Yeomanry | 7 Sep. 1916 | Heilly Station Cemetery |
| Pte. | William Buxton | 1st Bn., Northamptonshire Regiment | 9 May 1915 | Le Touret Memorial |
| Pte. | George W. Thurrell | 7th Bn., Northamptonshire Regt. | 27 Aug. 1917 | Tyne Cot |

The following names were added after the Second World War:

| Rank | Name | Unit | Date of death | Burial/Commemoration |
|---|---|---|---|---|
| Sgt. | Leonard C. Fitt | No. 115 Squadron RAF (Wellingtons) | 11 Apr. 1943 | Le Thour Cemetery |
| Bdr. | Eric Hird | Royal Artillery | 12 Feb. 1944 | Nairobi War Cemetery |
