= Barnham station =

Barnham station can mean either

- Barnham railway station a railway station serving Barnham, West Sussex.
- Barnham railway station (Suffolk) a former railway station in Barnham, Suffolk.
