= Ingham railway station =

Former railway station in England

Coordinates: 52.3046°N 0.7227°E

Ingham

General information
- Location: Ingham, West Suffolk; England
- Platforms: 1

Other information
- Status: Disused

History
- Original company: Thetford and Watton Railway
- Pre-grouping: Great Eastern Railway
- Post-grouping: London and North Eastern Railway

Key dates
- 1 March 1876: Station opened
- 8 June 1953: Station closed
Location

Ingham railway station was a railway station in Ingham, Suffolk which was located was on the route between Thetford and Bury St Edmunds.

== History ==
The railway line between Bury St Edmunds and Thetford was proposed by the Bury St Edmunds and Thetford Railway (B&TR) and authorised on 5 July 1865; but the company had problems in raising the necessary money. After assistance was given by the Thetford and Watton Railway (T&WR, see Bury and Thetford (Swaffham Branch)), the plan was modified, and instead of running to the main station at Thetford, a curve was built so that T&WR trains from Swaffham could run directly to the Bury St Edmunds line without reversing at Thetford. The B&TR line between Bury St Edmunds and Thetford Bridge was opened on 1 March 1876. The B&TR was purchased by the Great Eastern Railway (GER) in 1878.

Trains on the B&TR were operated by the T&WR until 1879, when operation was taken over by the GER; after this, trains from Bury began to run to Thetford; the east to south curve at Thetford Bridge was not used after 1880. Thetford Bridge was then the last station before Thetford.

The station was closed to passenger traffic on 8 June 1953 although goods traffic lingered on for a few years before withdrawal on 24 June 1960. The station had a single platform with a ticket office and a small goods yard.

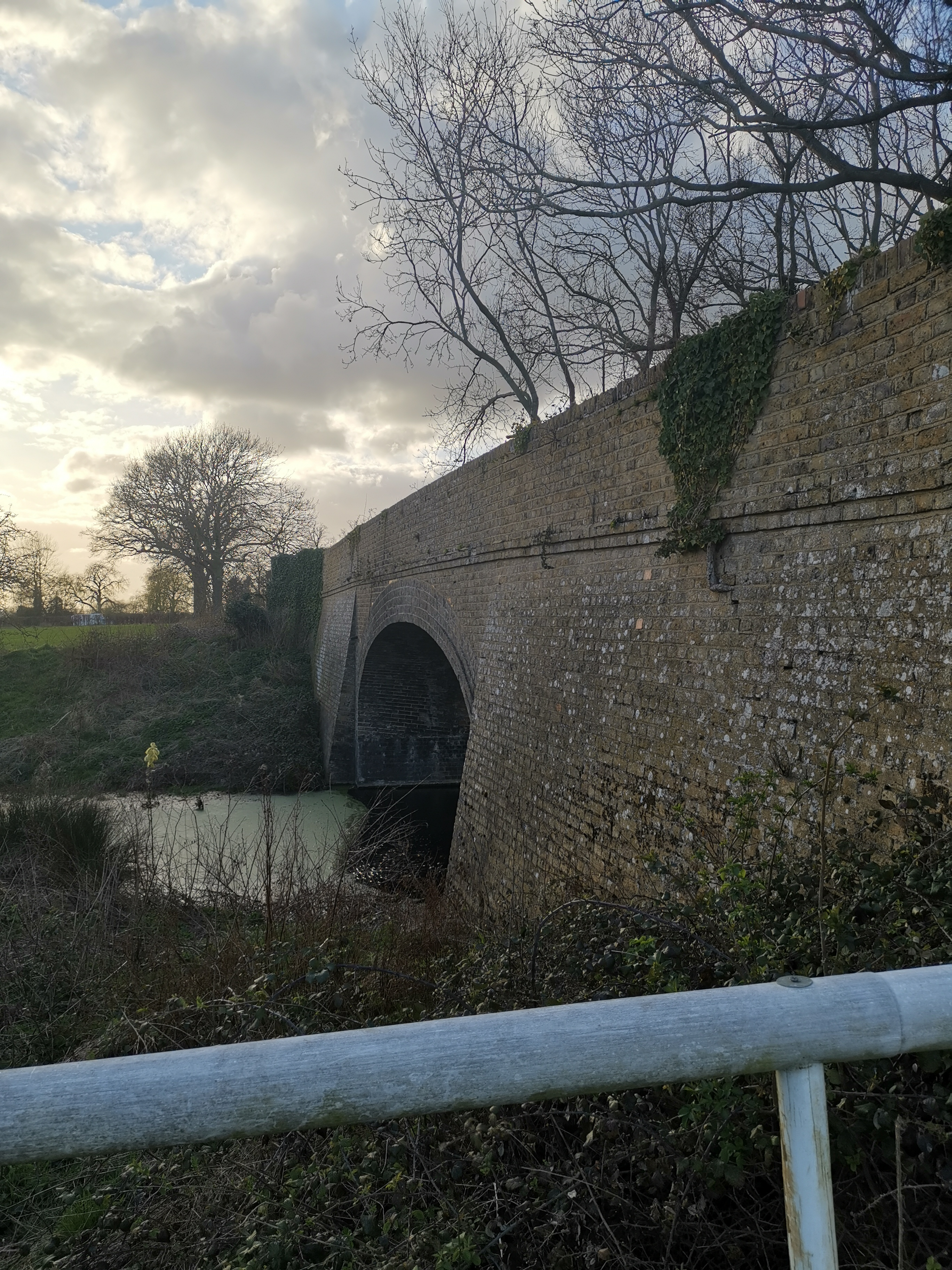
Railway bridge carrying footpath over the line the South of Ingham railway station

Preceding station	Disused railways	Following station
Seven Hills Halt	Great Eastern Railway; Thetford-Bury St Edmunds Line	Bury St Edmunds
