= Barnham railway station (Suffolk) =

Former railway station in Suffolk, England

Coordinates: 52.3795°N 0.7336°E

Barnham
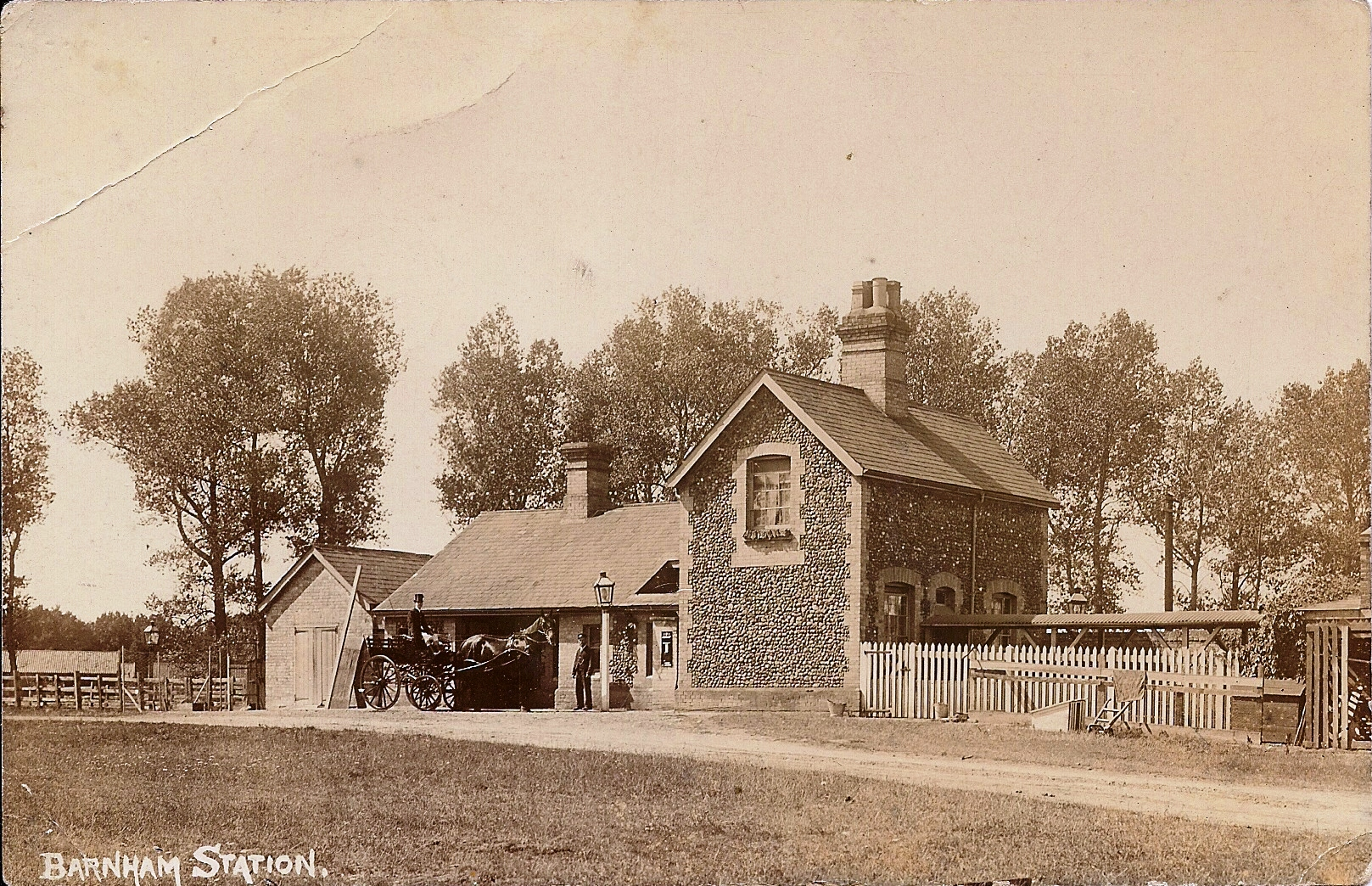

General information
- Location: Barnham, West Suffolk; England

Other information
- Status: Disused

History
- Original company: Thetford and Watton Railway
- Pre-grouping: Great Eastern Railway
- Post-grouping: London and North Eastern Railway

Key dates
- 1 March 1876: Station opened
- 8 June 1953: Station closed
Location

Barnham railway station is a former station in Barnham, Suffolk on a now closed line between Thetford and Bury St Edmunds. It was located close to the Norfolk border.

== History ==
The railway line between Bury St Edmunds and Thetford was proposed by the Bury St Edmunds and Thetford Railway (B&TR) and authorised on 5 July 1865; but the company had problems in raising the necessary money. After assistance was given by the Thetford and Watton Railway (T&WR), the plan was modified, and instead of running to the main station at Thetford, a curve was built so that T&WR trains from Swaffham could run directly to the Bury St Edmunds line without reversing at Thetford. The B&TR line between Bury St Edmunds and Thetford Bridge was opened on 1 March 1876. The B&TR was purchased by the Great Eastern Railway (GER) in 1878.

Trains on the B&TR were operated by the T&WR until 1879, when operation was taken over by the GER; after this, trains from Bury began to run to Thetford; the east to south curve at Thetford Bridge was not used after 1880. Thetford Bridge was then the last station before Thetford.

Former Services

| Preceding station | Disused railways | Following station |
|---|---|---|
| Thetford Bridge | Great Eastern Railway; Thetford-Bury St Edmunds Line | Seven Hills Halt |
