= Holme Hale railway station =

Former railway station in England

Coordinates: 52.6284°N 0.7729°E

Holme Hale
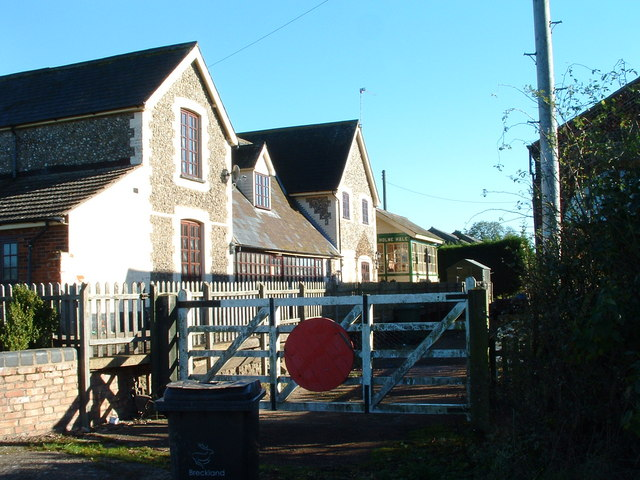
- Holme Hale railway station in 2006

General information
- Location: Holme Hale, Norfolk; England
- Platforms: 1

Other information
- Status: Disused

History
- Original company: Watton and Swaffham Railway
- Pre-grouping: Great Eastern Railway
- Post-grouping: London and North Eastern Railway

Key dates
- 15 November 1875: Opened
- 15 June 1964: Closed to passengers
- 28 December 1964: closed for freight
Route map
Location

Holme Hale railway station was located in Holme Hale, Norfolk, near Swaffham. It was on the Great Eastern Railway line between Swaffham and Thetford, and closed in 1964.

== History ==
In 1869, the Watton and Swaffham Railway proposed a route as an extension to the existing Thetford to Watton line. The route would run for 9.25 miles (14.89 km) from Swaffham to Watton, with intermediate stops in North Pickenham and Holme Hale. Construction of the line started in April 1873, with Holme Hale station being almost complete in September 1874. The line opened on 15 November 1875, with Holme Hale being the only intermediate station.

A twenty-lever signal box, consisting of fourteen working and six spare levers, was constructed between 1891 and 1892 in response to the Board of Trade requiring that the Watton and Swaffham Railway interlock all points and signals along the line. They did this using powers provided by the Regulation of Railways Act 1889, which allowed them to order passenger rail lines to do so.

== Services ==
On opening, the station had a service of four trains a day in each direction between Swaffham and Roudham Junction. After the construction of the Bury St Edmunds and Thetford Railway in 1876, these services were extended from Roudham Junction to Bury St Edmunds. This changed when the Great Eastern Railway took over in 1879, with services then terminating at Thetford instead of Bury St Edmunds. Just before its closure to passengers in 1964, five trains a day in each direction called at the station. The line north of Watton remained open for another year to serve freight traffic.

| Preceding station | Disused railways | Following station |
|---|---|---|
| Swaffham; Line and station closed | Great Eastern Railway; Bury and Thetford (Swaffham Branch) | Watton; Line and station closed |

== Bibliography ==
- Paye, Peter (2020). Branch Lines to Thetford. Gloucestershire: Lightmoor Press. ISBN 9781911038771.
- Adderson, Richard; Kenworthy, Graham (December 2016). Branch Lines around Swaffham. Midhurst: Middleton Press. ISBN 9781908174970.
- Regulation of Railways Act 1889 (PDF) – via Railways Archive.
