= Thetford Bridge railway station =

Former railway station in England

Thetford Bridge

General information
- Location: Thetford, Breckland; England
- Coordinates: 52.4113°N 0.7634°E
- Grid reference: TL880828
- Platforms: 2

Other information
- Status: Disused

History
- Original company: Thetford and Watton Railway
- Pre-grouping: Great Eastern Railway
- Post-grouping: London and North Eastern Railway

Key dates
- 15 November 1875: Station opened
- 8 June 1953: Station closed
Location

Thetford Bridge railway station served the eastern part of Thetford, Norfolk, England between 1875 and 1953.

== History ==
The railway line between Bury St Edmunds and Thetford was proposed by the Bury St Edmunds and Thetford Railway (B&TR) and authorised on 5 July 1865; but the company had problems in raising the necessary money. After assistance was given by the Thetford and Watton Railway (T&WR), the plan was modified, and instead of running to the main station at Thetford, a curve was built so that T&WR trains from Swaffham could run directly to the Bury St Edmunds line without reversing at Thetford. This curve was opened first, on 15 November 1875, along with Thetford Bridge station. The B&TR line between Bury St Edmunds and Thetford Bridge was opened on 1 March 1876. The B&TR was purchased by the Great Eastern Railway (GER) in 1878.

Trains on the B&TR were operated by the T&WR until 1879, when operation was taken over by the GER; after this, trains from Bury began to run to Thetford; the east to south curve at Thetford Bridge was not used after 1880. Thetford Bridge was then the last station before Thetford.

In September 1911 the station was used as a railhead by the British Army who were running a series of war games.

In January 1923 the station was taken over by the London and North Eastern Railway.

Following nationalisation in 1948 Thetford Bridge was operated by the Eastern Region of British Railways.

The station closed on 8 June 1953.

Preceding station	Disused railways	Following station
Thetford; Line closed, station open	Great Eastern Railway; Thetford to Bury St Edmunds line	Barnham; Line and station closed
