= Stenancistrocerus =

Scientific classification
- Kingdom: Animalia
- Phylum: Arthropoda
- Class: Insecta
- Order: Hymenoptera
- Family: Vespidae
- Subfamily: Eumeninae
- Genus: Stenancistrocerus; Saussure, 1856

Type species
- Stenancistrocerus atropos (Lepeletier, 1841)

Species
- Stenancistrocerus alluaudi (Dusmet, 1925); Stenancistrocerus atropos (Lepeletier, 1841); Stenancistrocerus biblicus (Giordani Soika, 1952); Stenancistrocerus excoriates (Morawitz, 1895); Stenancistrocerus hispanicus (Dusmet, 1903); Stenancistrocerus liliput Gusenleitner, 1993; Stenancistrocerus obstrictus (Moravitz, 1895); Stenancistrocerus punjabensis (Nurse, 1902); Stenancistrocerus transcaspicus (Kostylev, 1935)

Genus of wasps

Stenancistrocerus is a Palearctic genus of potter wasps.
