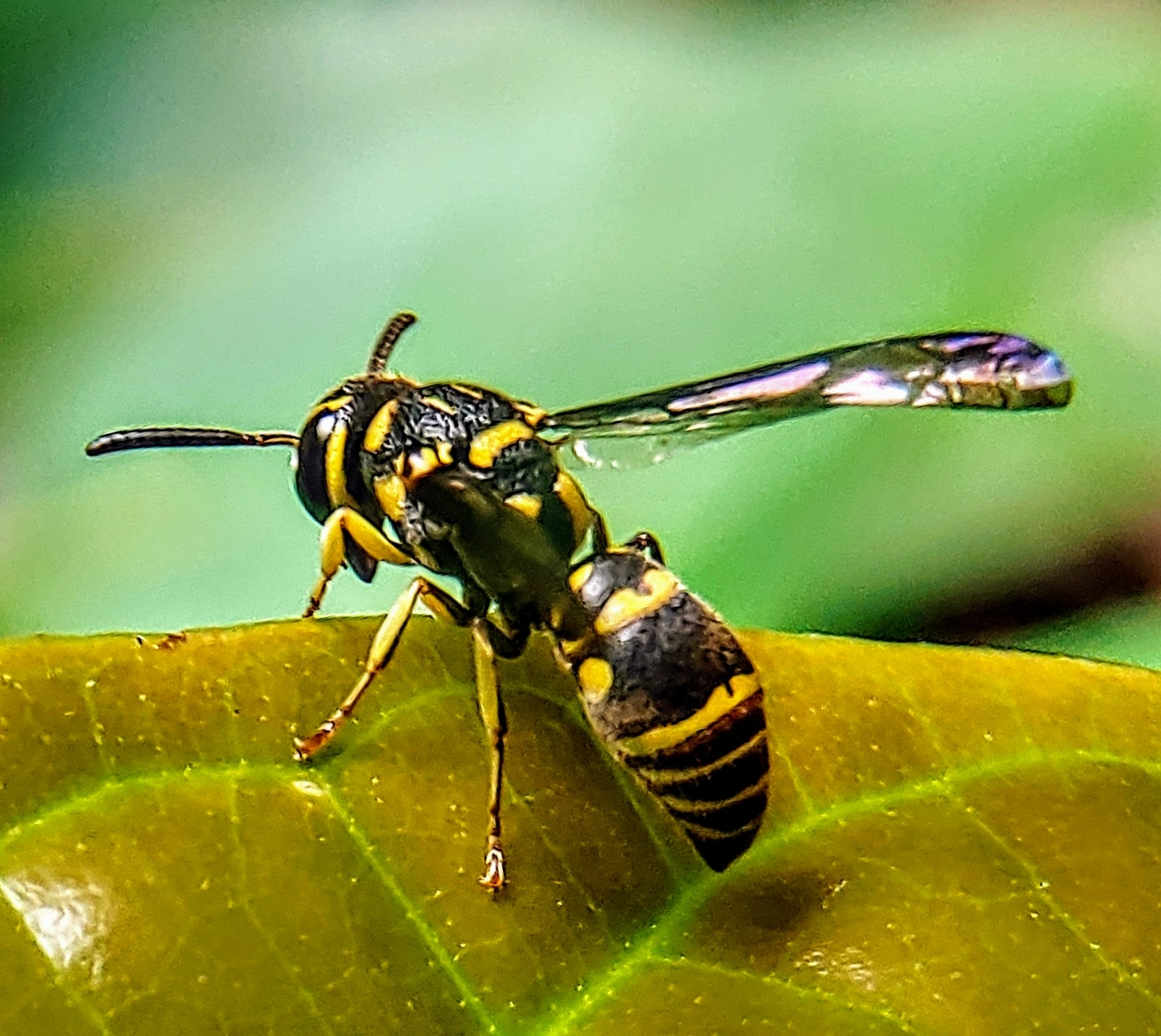
- S. guttulatus from Singapore

Scientific classification
- Domain: Eukaryota
- Kingdom: Animalia
- Phylum: Arthropoda
- Class: Insecta
- Order: Hymenoptera
- Family: Vespidae
- Subfamily: Eumeninae
- Genus: Stenodyneriellus; Giordani Soika,1962

Type species
- Stenodyneriellus turneriellus Giordani Soika, 1962

= Stenodyneriellus =

Genus of wasps

Stenodyneriellus is an Australasian and Indomalayan genus of potter wasps.

== Species ==
The following species are included within the genus Stenodyneriellus:

- Stenodyneriellus apicatimimus Giordani Soika, 1996
- Stenodyneriellus arnemlandicus (Borsato, 1994)
- Stenodyneriellus auricomus Gusenleitner, 2008
- Stenodyneriellus bannensis (Schulthess, 1934)
- Stenodyneriellus bicoloratus (Saussure, 1856)
- Stenodyneriellus birostratus Giordani Soika, 1994
- Stenodyneriellus boholensis (Schulthess, 1934)
- Stenodyneriellus brisbanensis Giordani Soika, 1961
- Stenodyneriellus carinicollis (Cameron, 1903)
- Stenodyneriellus carnarvonensis Giordani Soika, 1977
- Stenodyneriellus celebensis Giordani Soika, 1994
- Stenodyneriellus cilicioides Giordani Soika, 1994
- Stenodyneriellus cilicius Cameron, 1902
- Stenodyneriellus clypearis Giordani Soika, 1995
- Stenodyneriellus convexus Giordani Soika, 1995
- Stenodyneriellus darnleyensis Giordani Soika, 1977
- Stenodyneriellus duplostrigatus (von Schulthess, 1934)
- Stenodyneriellus facilis (Smith, 1861)
- Stenodyneriellus fistulosus (Saussure, 1867)
- Stenodyneriellus flaviventris Giordani Soika, 1995
- Stenodyneriellus flavobalteatus (Cameron, 1903)
- Stenodyneriellus flavoclypeatus Giordani Soika, 1994
- Stenodyneriellus guttulatus (Saussure, 1862)
- Stenodyneriellus heterospilus (Cameron, 1907)
- Stenodyneriellus hewittii (Cameron, 1907)
- Stenodyneriellus indicus Gusenleitner, 1997
- Stenodyneriellus insularis Smith, 1859
- Stenodyneriellus iriensis Giordani Soika, 1995
- Stenodyneriellus laevis Giordani Soika, 1995
- Stenodyneriellus lepidus Borsato, 1995
- Stenodyneriellus longithorax Giordani Soika, 1994
- Stenodyneriellus montanus Giordani Soika, 1995
- Stenodyneriellus multimaculatus Giordani Soika, 1993
- Stenodyneriellus multipictus (Smith, 1858)
- Stenodyneriellus nigriculus Giordani Soika, 1995
- Stenodyneriellus nitidissimus Giordani Soika, 1995
- Stenodyneriellus nitidus Giordani Soika, 1995
- Stenodyneriellus novempunctatus Giordani Soika, 1977
- Stenodyneriellus octolineatus Giordani Soika, 1995
- Stenodyneriellus perpunctatus Giordani Soika, 1994
- Stenodyneriellus plurinotatus Giordani Soika, 1995
- Stenodyneriellus praeclusus (Nurse, 1903)
- Stenodyneriellus pseudancistrocerus (Giordani Soika, 1961)
- Stenodyneriellus pseudoplanus Giordani Soika, 1995
- Stenodyneriellus punctatissimus Giordani Soika, 1977
- Stenodyneriellus punctulatus Giordani Soika, 1995
- Stenodyneriellus rubroclypeatus Giordani Soika, 1994
- Stenodyneriellus rufinodus Giordani Soika, 1995
- Stenodyneriellus rufoflavus Selis, 2016
- Stenodyneriellus sequestratus (Nurse, 1903)
- Stenodyneriellus soikai Borsato, 2003
- Stenodyneriellus spinosiusculus Giordani Soika, 1961
- Stenodyneriellus sublamellatus Giordani Soika, 1994
- Stenodyneriellus tegularis Giordani Soika, 1994
- Stenodyneriellus tricoloratus Gusenleitner, 1996
- Stenodyneriellus trimaculatus Giordani Soika, 1988
- Stenodyneriellus turneriellus Giordani Soika, 1961
- Stenodyneriellus wickwari (Meade-Waldo, 1911)
- Stenodyneriellus yanchepensis (Giordani Soika, 1961)
- Stenodyneriellus unipunctatus Giordani Soika, 1995
