= Stow Bedon railway station =

Former railway station in England

Coordinates: 52.5327°N 0.8596°E

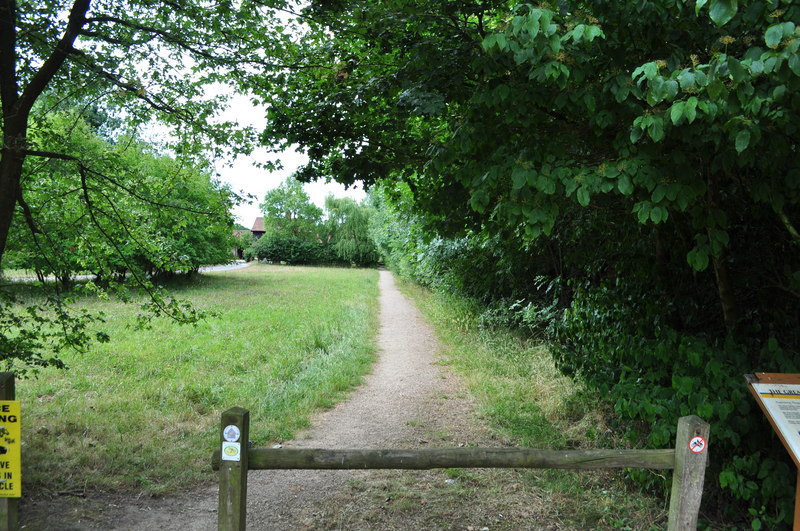
The site today

Stow Bedon railway station is a closed station in Stow Bedon, Norfolk. It was initially opened in 1869 by the Great Eastern Railway network and became London and North Eastern Railway in 1923. It became British Railways in 1948 who closed the station in 1964.

Preceding station	Disused railways	Following station
Watton; Line and station closed	Great Eastern Railway; Bury and Thetford (Swaffham Branch)	Wretham & Hockham; Line and station closed
