= Loch Neaton =

- Location within England
- Location: Norfolk, England
- Coordinates: 52°34′36″N 0°49′40″E
- Type: lake

Loch Neaton is a freshwater lake near Watton in Norfolk, England. It was created after earth was excavated in 1875 to create a mile long embankment for the extension to Swaffham of the Thetford to Watton railway station. Local businessmen saw the potential of creating a leisure park in the area, with a tennis court, bowling green and bandstand. The excavated area was filled with water to create a lake for swimming, boating and fishing.

In honor of the railway labourers that created the excavation, who were mainly Scottish, the lake was called a Loch.
