= Wretham and Hockham railway station =

Former railway station in England

Wretham and Hockham
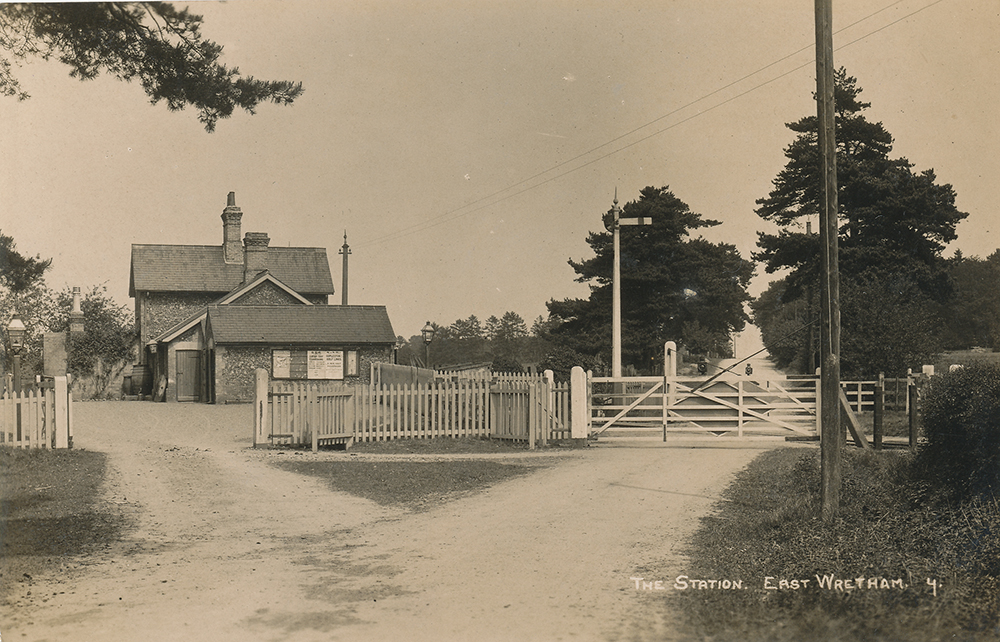
- An old postcard of the station

General information
- Location: Wretham, Hockham; England
- Grid reference: TL926908
- Platforms: 1

Other information
- Status: Disused

History
- Original company: Thetford and Watton Railway
- Pre-grouping: Great Eastern Railway
- Post-grouping: London & North Eastern Railway

Key dates
- 28 January 1869: Opened as 'Wretham'
- 1 November 1893: Renamed 'Wretham and Hockham'
- 15 June 1964: Closed
Location

Wretham and Hockham railway station was a station in Norfolk serving the villages of Wretham and Hockham. It was on the Crab and Winkle line between Swaffham and Thetford. The station was opened for goods traffic on 28 January 1869 and for passengers on 18 October 1869. It was taken over by Great Eastern Railway on 21 July 1879. It closed in 1964. The station is now a private residence.

Preceding station	Disused railways	Following station
Stow Bedon; Line and station closed	Great Eastern Railway; Bury and Thetford (Swaffham Branch)	Roudham Junction; Line and station closed
