= Barnham Heath =

UK Site of Special Scientific Interest

Coordinates: 52.384°N 0.764°E

- Site of Special Scientific Interest
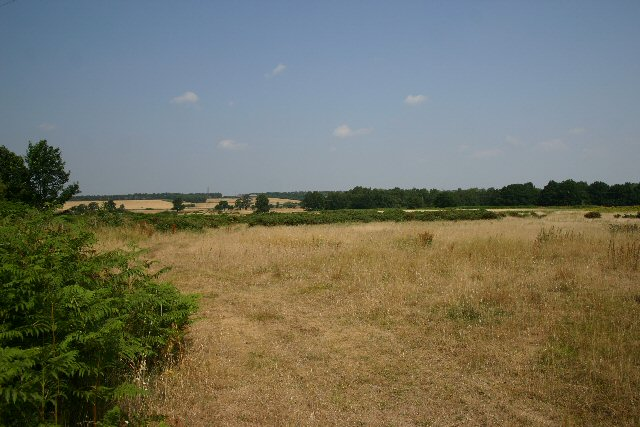
- Location of Barnham Heath.
- Area of search: Suffolk
- Grid reference: TL 882 798
- Interest: Biological
- Area: 78.6 hectares
- Notification date: 1985
- Location map: Magic Map

Barnham Heath is a 78.6-hectare (194-acre) biological Site of Special Scientific Interest near Barnham, a village south of Thetford in Suffolk. It is a Nature Conservation Review site, Grade 2, and part of the Breckland Special Protection Area under the European Union Directive on the Conservation of Wild Birds

This site has areas of acidic heathland with damp grassland in river valleys. Gravel workings and scrub have produced habitats valuable to birds such as nightingales and whitethroats. Birds found on open heathland include stone curlews, a protected species, and wheatears. Six species of lichen and eight of moss have been recorded.
