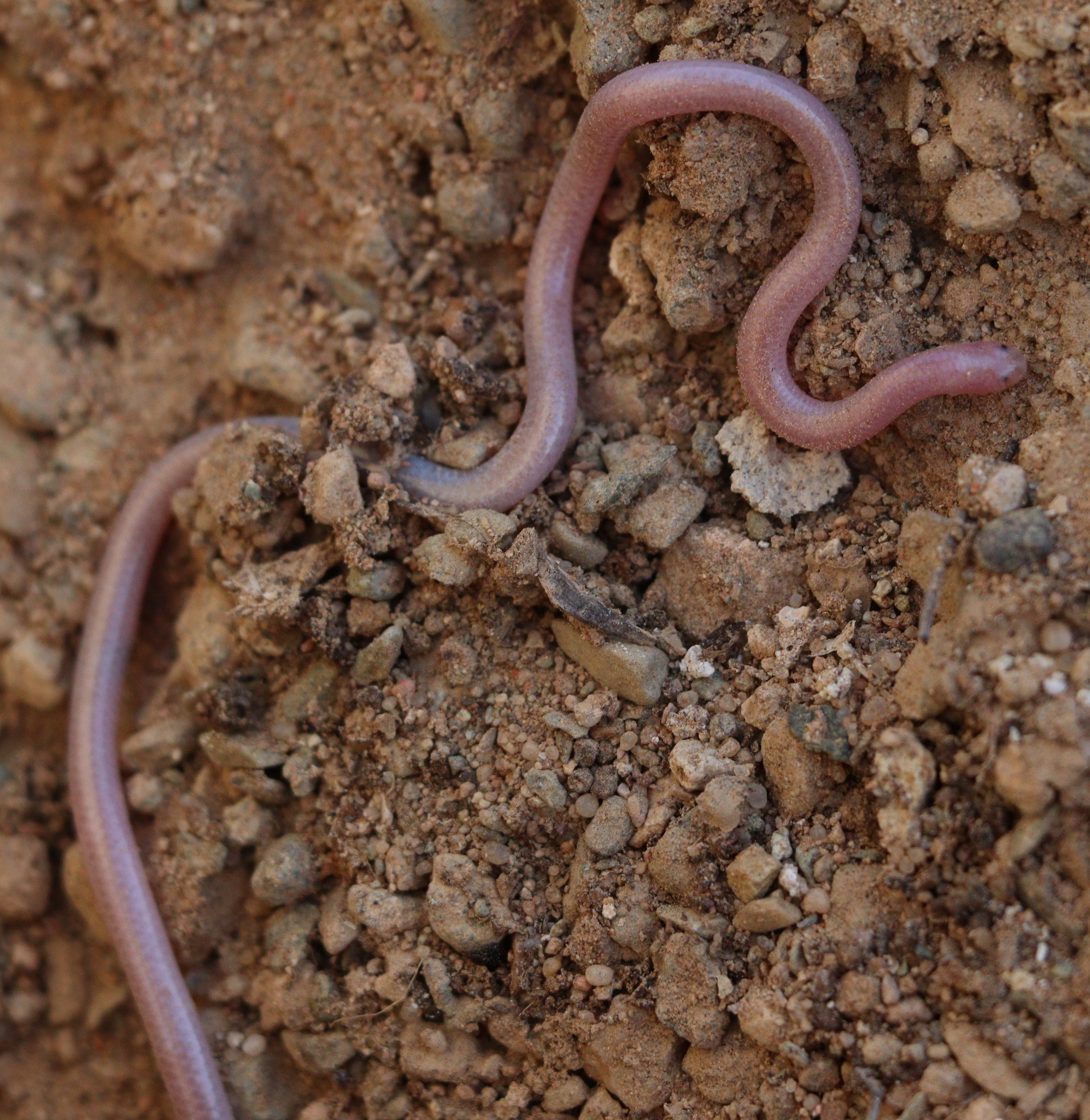

Conservation status
- Least Concern (IUCN 3.1)

Scientific classification
- Kingdom: Animalia
- Phylum: Chordata
- Class: Reptilia
- Order: Squamata
- Suborder: Serpentes
- Family: Leptotyphlopidae
- Genus: Myriopholis
- Species: M. nursii

Binomial name
- Myriopholis nursii (Anderson, 1896)

Synonyms
- Glauconia nursii Anderson, 1896; Leptotyphlops nursii — Parker, 1938; Leptotyphlops blanfordi nursi — Hahn, 1978; Leptotyphlops nursii — McDiarmid, Campbell & Touré, 1999; Myriopholis nursii — Adalsteinsson et al., 2009; Leptotyphlops nursii — Wallach et al., 2014

= Nurse's blind snake =

Species of snake

Nurse's blind snake (Myriopholis nursii) is a species of snake in the family Leptotyphlopidae. The species is native to easternmost Africa and westernmost Asia.

== Etymology ==
The specific name, nursii, is in honor of English entomologist Charles George Nurse.

== Geographic distribution ==
Myriopholis nursii is native to the southern Arabian Peninsula and the Horn of Africa.

== Habitat ==
The preferred natural habitat of Myriopholis nursii is savanna, at elevations of 80–2,000 m (260–6,560 ft), but it has also been found in agricultural areas such as alfalfa fields.

== Behavior ==
Myriopholis nursii is terrestrial and fossorial.

== Diet ==
Myriopholis nursii preys predominately upon ant larvae.

== Reproduction ==
Myriopholis nursii is oviparous.
