= Watton railway station (England) =

Former railway station in England

Coordinates: 52.5698°N 0.8351°E

Watton

General information
- Location: Watton, Norfolk; England
- Platforms: 2

Other information
- Status: Disused

History
- Original company: Thetford and Watton Railway
- Pre-grouping: Great Eastern Railway
- Post-grouping: London and North Eastern Railway

Key dates
- 18 Oct 1869: Opened as Watton
- 1 Jul 1923: Renamed; Watton (Norfolk)
- 15 Jun 1964: Closed for passengers
- 19 April 1965: closed for freight
Location

Watton railway station was located in Watton, Norfolk. It was on the Great Eastern Railway line between Swaffham and Thetford, and closed for passengers in 1964 and freight in 1965 as part of the Beeching Axe. After closure the station was demolished and the area redeveloped leaving no trace of the station or the railway.

Preceding station	Disused railways	Following station
Holme Hale; Line and station closed	Great Eastern Railway; Bury and Thetford (Swaffham Branch)	Stow Bedon; Line and station closed
