= Barnham, Suffolk =

Village in West Suffolk, England

Coordinates: 52.38°N 0.747°E

Barnham
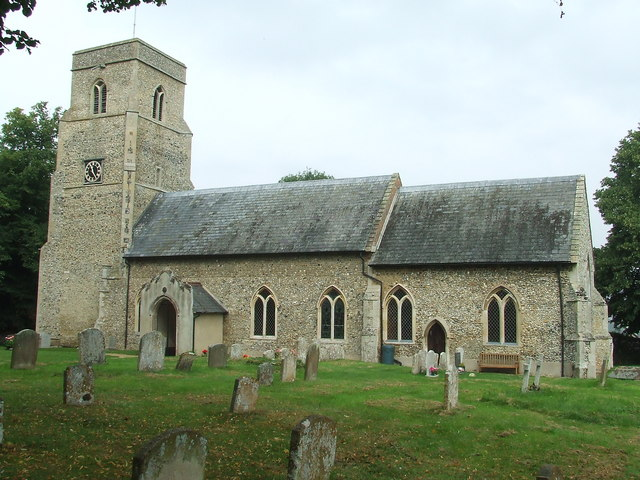
- The church of St Gregory, Barnham

- Location within Suffolk
- Interactive map of Barnham
- Population: 606 (2011 census)
- OS grid reference: TL869793
- District: West Suffolk
- Shire county: Suffolk
- Region: East
- Country: England
- Sovereign state: United Kingdom
- Post town: THETFORD
- Postcode district: IP24
- Dialling code: 01842
- Police: Suffolk
- Fire: Suffolk
- Ambulance: East of England
- UK Parliament: West Suffolk

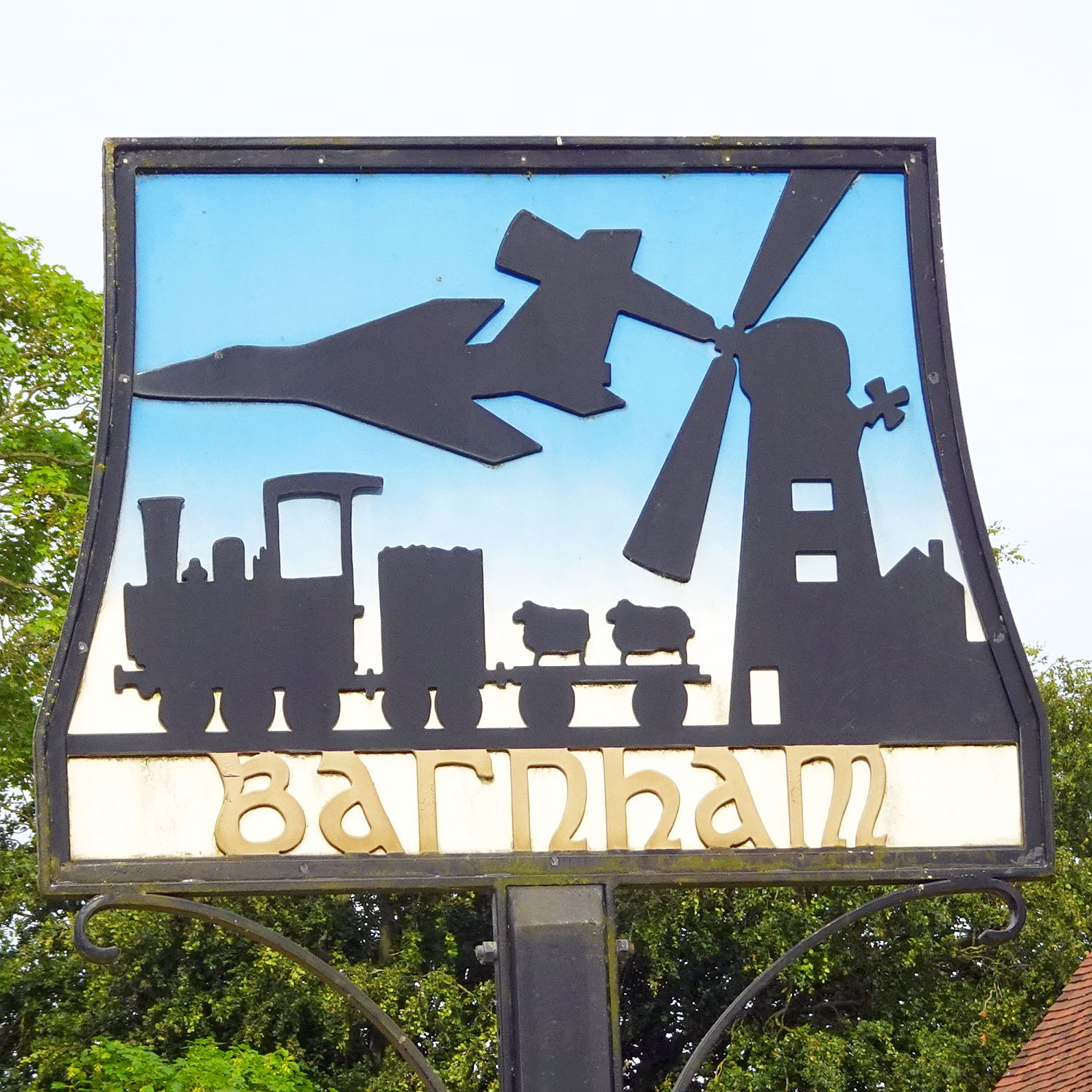
Barnham Village Sign

Barnham is a village and civil parish in the West Suffolk district of the English county of Suffolk about 3 miles (4.8 km) south of Thetford and 9 miles (14.5 km) north of Bury St Edmunds on the A134. The village gained national media attention when the government declared they were looking into housing asylum seekers in the former military base in the village. The village of Euston is 1 mile (1.6 km) to the east. According to the Swedish scholar Eilert Ekwall, the name of the village means "Beorn's homestead".

== Prehistory ==
Barnham is the location of the earliest known instance of fire created by humans. East Farm, Barnham, is an important archaeological site dating back to the Hoxnian Stage of the Lower Palaeolithic (about 400,000 years ago). Flint artefacts have also been found.

== History ==
The Domesday Book of 1086 records that Barnham housed 35 families, which meant it was a large village by the standards of the time. It was part of the holdings of Earl Hugh of Chester, having been held by Edward the Confessor in 1066. The parish church, dedicated to St Gregory, was heavily restored in the 19th century. The village used to be split into two parishes, divided between the liberties of St Edmund and of Thetford until 1639. Ruins of the other church, dedicated to St Martin, can still be seen.

From 1808 to 1814, Barnham had a station in the London to Great Yarmouth shutter telegraph chain, which connected the Admiralty in London to its naval ships in the port of Great Yarmouth. Barnham railway station on the Thetford to Bury St Edmunds line closed in 1960. Barnham Windmill was a three-storey tower mill built in the village in 1821. It has been converted into residential accommodation.

== RAF Barnham ==
RAF Barnham is located to the north of Barnham on Thetford Heath, along the A134 2 miles (3.2 km) south of Thetford. The station was opened in 1939 and used as a chemical weapons store during and after the Second World War. In the 1950s, a nuclear weapons store facility was built on part of the site to store the UK's free-fall nuclear bombs for the Blue Danube project. The site is known to have been operational as a nuclear store in September 1956, commanded from RAF Honington, 6 miles (9.7 km) to the south, but it is believed to have stopped in 1963, after the development of the Blue Steel missile programme. The nuclear facility was closed in 1966 and became an industrial site. However, it is a scheduled monument and several buildings on it have listed building status.

Barnham training area remains a training site for the RAF Regiment and the camp itself is used by Suffolk and Norfolk police as a training area The camp remains a satellite camp to RAF Honington.

== Proposed use as asylum accommodation ==
In June 2026, the Home Office announced that MoD Barnham was one of three former military sites being considered for use as asylum seeker accommodation, alongside MoD Bicester and MoD Linton-on-Ouse. The government stated that the three sites could together provide accommodation for approximately 3,750 asylum seekers, subject to feasibility assessments, planning permission and other necessary approvals. The proposal formed part of a government programme intended to reduce the use of hotels for asylum accommodation.

A Home Office factsheet stated that, if the proposal proceeded, the Barnham site would provide basic, largely self-contained accommodation for single adult male asylum applicants aged between 18 and 65. Occupation would be introduced in phases and the site would be managed by a specialist accommodation provider, with security personnel and closed-circuit television operating continuously. Residents would not be detained and would be permitted to leave the site. The Home Office stated that the proposed accommodation would operate for a minimum of ten years.

The Home Office subsequently submitted an Urgent Crown Development application to the Ministry of Housing, Communities and Local Government. It stated that submission of the application did not constitute a final decision and that the proposal remained subject to planning, feasibility work and other assessments.

The proposal was opposed by local authorities. Suffolk County Council stated that it had been informed that the site could accommodate approximately 1,250 men. On 1 July 2026, West Suffolk Council unanimously agreed a motion stating that RAF Barnham was unsuitable for the proposed use, citing its rural location, limited infrastructure and transport links, and the possible effect on local services and surrounding communities.

West Suffolk Council also raised potential environmental constraints associated with the site's relationship to the Breckland Special Protection Area and Special Area of Conservation, including habitat protections relating to the stone-curlew. The council argued that any development would require assessment under the Conservation of Habitats and Species Regulations 2017.

On 13 October 2026, the Home Office formally withdrew its original planning application, which sought to house up to 1,250 individuals. A replacement application was submitted on 14 October 2026 for 931 service users.

Conservative Party Leader and Opposition Leader Kemi Badenoch condemned the proposal, saying to Barnham residents that “the Conservative Party is on your side”.

== Independence referendum ==
On 24 October 2026, Barnham Parish Council hosted a meeting for the residents of Barnham where the Barnham Residents Association was formed. This was in response and opposition to government proposals to use the former MOD Barnham site for asylum seeker accommodation. The group was formed to coordinate community engagement, raise awareness of the proposals, undertake research, and prepare responses to government consultation documents. The residents moved to make their first order of business holding a referendum. Barnham Parish Council Chairman John Bauer said the vote would be on whether the village supports a petition for “crown dependency status” and described this as “a bit like Jersey, Guernsey, Isle of Man whereby we retain loyalty to the crown while still removing ourselves from the Home Office jurisdiction”.

The referendum, which carried no legal weight, took place on 21 November 2026, resulting in residents voting to leave. There were 400 to 500 residents eligble to vote, with 257 voting for independence, 16 against, and one spoilt ballot.

== Barnham Heath SSSI ==
Barnham Heath is a Site of Special Scientific Interest to the east of the village. Its 76.5 hectares (189 acres) consist of Breckland heath with a range of grassland and scrub habitats. It is an important bird habitat, including the protected stone curlew (B. oedicnemus). Land surrounding the village also forms part of the Breckland Farmland and Breckland Forest SSSIs as well as the Barnham Little Heath and Thetford Heaths SSSI.
