= Ingham, Suffolk =

Village in Suffolk, England

Coordinates: 52.3041°N 0.7199°E

Ingham
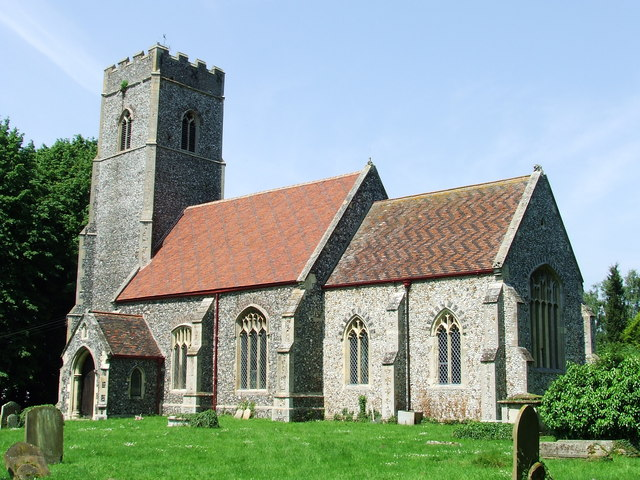
- St. Bartholomew Church

- Location within Suffolk
- Population: 451 (2011)
- OS grid reference: TL850700
- Civil parish: Ingham
- District: West Suffolk
- Shire county: Suffolk
- Region: East
- Country: England
- Sovereign state: United Kingdom
- Post town: BURY ST EDMUNDS
- Postcode district: IP31
- Dialling code: 01284
- Police: Suffolk
- Fire: Suffolk
- Ambulance: East of England
- UK Parliament: West Suffolk

Ingham is a village and civil parish in the West Suffolk district of Suffolk in eastern England, located about six miles north of Bury St Edmunds on the A143 to Thetford in Norfolk. The village boasts a single church, a post office and a pub.

Ingham is mentioned in the Domesday Book of 1086. Possible etymologies are "homestead or village of a man called Inga" or "home of the Inguiones" (an ancient Germanic tribe).

The Church is dedicated to St. Bartholomew and is Church of England. The post office provides some local library links. The village school was a one-room school serving the small class of all grades. It closed in the mid 1980s as a result of declining numbers, despite the expansion of the village with the new housing estate in the 1960s and 1970s. Locals are mainly employed in Bury St Edmunds or Thetford, commuting to work, though some work locally in agriculture or transport industries.

Situated on a slight rise north of Bury St Edmunds the village has a large green, formerly including school playing fields to the east of the main road reached by a lane between the Church and the Post Office. Beyond the green lies the abandoned railway cutting - the line and Ingham railway station closed in the 1950s, though Ingham is still served by buses.

Thetford Forest lies a few miles to the north west.
