= Nairobi War Cemetery =

Military cemetery in Kenya

- Commonwealth War Graves Commission
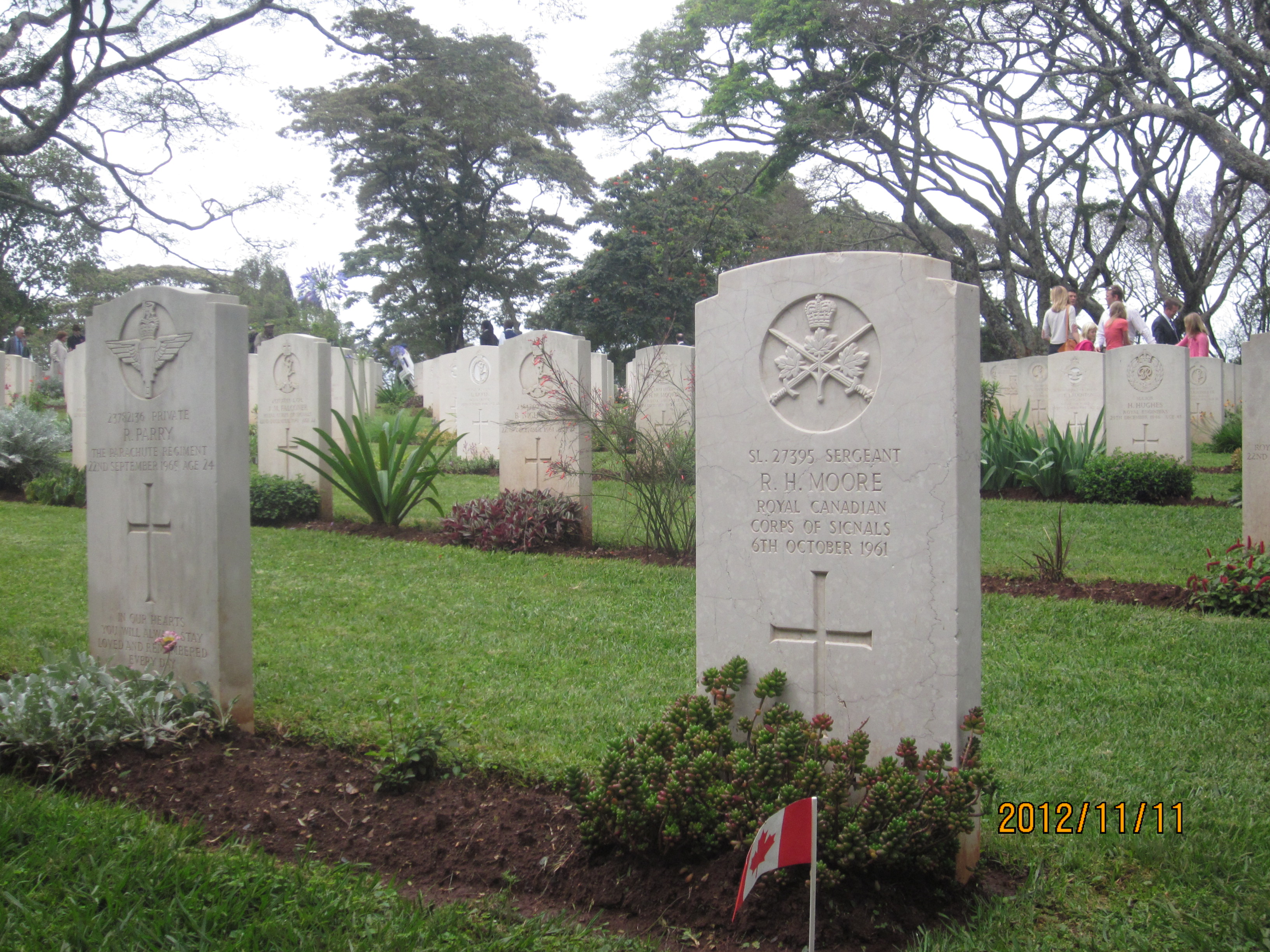
- The cemetery on Remembrance Day 2012
- Used for those deceased
- Established: 1941
- Location: 1°18′32.5″S 36°44′52.4″E near Nairobi, Kenya
- Designed by: G. Vey
- Total burials: 1942 (cemetery)
- Unknowns: 11

Burials by nation
- Allies of World War II: United Kingdom (Including Kenya, Nyasaland and Northern Rhodesia): 1808; South Africa: 131; Australia: 1; Canada: 1; New Zealand: 1; Other: 81 non-war burials

Burials by war
- World War II: 1942
- Statistics source: at cwgc.org

The Nairobi War Cemetery is a Commonwealth War Graves Commission burial ground for the dead of the Second World War located in Nairobi, Kenya.

== History and previous use ==
The cemetery was opened in 1941, and is the largest war cemetery in East Africa. It houses the graves of casualties from the East African campaign, some of which were transferred from civil cemeteries and temporary army burial grounds in other parts of Kenya.

Nairobi was the operational headquarters of the British Middle East Command during the East African campaign, and the base for the conquest of Jubaland and Italian Somaliland.

The cemetery was the location of two field hospitals, No. 87 which operated from June 1943 to December 1945, and No.150 British General Hospital, which operated for a period in 1943.

== Internments ==
Interned at the cemetery are members of the East African Military Labour Corps, the South African Air Force, the King's African Rifles, the Nigeria Regiment, the Northern Rhodesia Regiment, and the African Pioneer Corps.

The cemetery also houses the East African Memorial, commemorating the casualties from the advance into Italian Somaliland and Ethiopia who have no known resting place, as well as casualties from the 1942 Battle of Madagascar who have no known grave.

Also memorialized are those lost in the sinking of the troopship Khedive Ismail, which sank en route to Ceylon on 12 February 1944 carrying 996 members of the East African Artillery's 301st Field Regiment, 271 Royal Navy personnel, 19 WRNs, 53 nursing sisters and their matron and nine members of the First Aid Nursing Yeomanry.

The cemetery is open to the public, and is a popular site for photography.
