= Roudham Junction railway station =

Former railway station in England

Coordinates: 52.4525°N 0.8243°E

Roudham Junction railway station was a station in Norfolk, England. It was located in a remote area east of Thetford, where the Main Line between Norwich and Thetford joined the branch line from Swaffham. Today a few remnants of the former station can be glimpsed from the passing trains.

Six years after the GER was formed, work started on a branch line from the Ely to Norwich line towards Swaffham, leaving the main line at Roudham. The station opened, along with the rest of the line, on 18 October 1869.

With low passenger numbers serving a sparsely populated area, the GER withdrew main line stopping services at Roudham Junction in 1920. On 1 May 1932 the advertised passenger service provided by the branch line trains ceased, but an unadvertised service of trains continued to stop.

As part of the Beeching rationalisation plan, the station closed with the closure of the Swaffham line on 15 June 1964.

Preceding station	Historical railways	Following station
Thetford; Line and station open	Great Eastern Railway; Main Line	Harling Road; Line and station open
	Disused railways	
Thetford; Line and station open	Great Eastern Railway; Swaffham Branch	Wretham & Hockham; Line and station closed
