= Charles George Nurse =

English officer, naturalist, entomologist (1862–1933)

Charles George Nurse FES
- Born: 22 March 1862; Barnham, Suffolk
- Died: 5 November 1933 (aged 71); Tunbridge Wells, Kent
- Burial place: Rusthall New Cemetery
- Occupations: Military officer and entomologist
- Known for: Contributions to knowledge of the natural history of India, and presentations from his collections to the Natural History Museum, London

Charles George Nurse FES (22 March 1862 in Barnham, Suffolk – 5 November 1933 in Tunbridge Wells, Kent) was an English military officer, naturalist, ornithologist and entomologist. He was one of many British military officers who made significant contributions to knowledge of the natural history of India. Among his discoveries were a snake, a butterfly, an ant, and a neuropteran. About 50 species of moths that he collected were described by entomologists G. Hampson and Lord Walsingham. Entomologists P. Cameron and Col. C. T. Bingham described 200 species of Hymenoptera from his collections. Nurse also discovered the species of mosquito, Anopheles nursei, later shown to carry the malarial parasite that affected the army campaigns in Mesopotamia.

== Life and career ==
Charles George Nurse was born on 22 March 1862 in Barnham, Suffolk, the eldest son of Rev. George Thompson Nurse, of Barnham and Euston, and Martha Aspland Nurse (née Johnson). He went to school at King Edward VI School, Bury St Edmunds, before joining the Royal Military Academy. A linguist with a sound knowledge of Russian, Hindustani and several Oriental languages, he advanced rapidly in his chosen career.

- 22 January 1881 commissioned into the 89th Foot as a 2nd lieutenant and advanced to lieutenant in July the same year.
- 1881-1884 served with the regiment in India as an interpreter and station staff officer, Kolapore.
- 1884 served with the 2nd Battalion Royal Irish Fusiliers in the Sudan Expedition seeing action at the battles of El-Teb and Tamai. He served under Gerald Graham and received a medal with clasp and the Khedive's Bronze Star.
- 27 December 1884 seconded to the Indian Staff Corps.
- 10 March 1885 promoted to lieutenant while serving in the Bombay Staff Corps.
- 1890 served with the Zaila Field Force in Somalia and commanded the base at Zaila. His book A Journey in Somaliland was published by the Royal Geographical Society in 1891 and led to his being elected a fellow of the society.
- 22 January 1892 promoted to captain in the Indian Staff Corps. In 1893 he had a fall from his horse resulting in a crack in his skull.
- January 1901 promoted to major in the Indian Staff Corps.
- January 1907 promoted to lieutenant-colonel in the 113th Infantry.
- 23 January 1909 by then commander of the 33rd Punjabi Regiment and retired from the Indian Army.
- 12 May 1915 re-appointed from retirement and attached to the 3rd Battalion Bedfordshire Regiment in Flanders.

He lived at "Redcote", Rustwick, Rusthall Park after retirement and was a member of the Tunbridge Wells and Counties Clubs. He died of acute pneumonia on 5 November 1933 in Tunbridge Wells, Kent, and was buried at Rusthall New Cemetery.

== Natural history ==
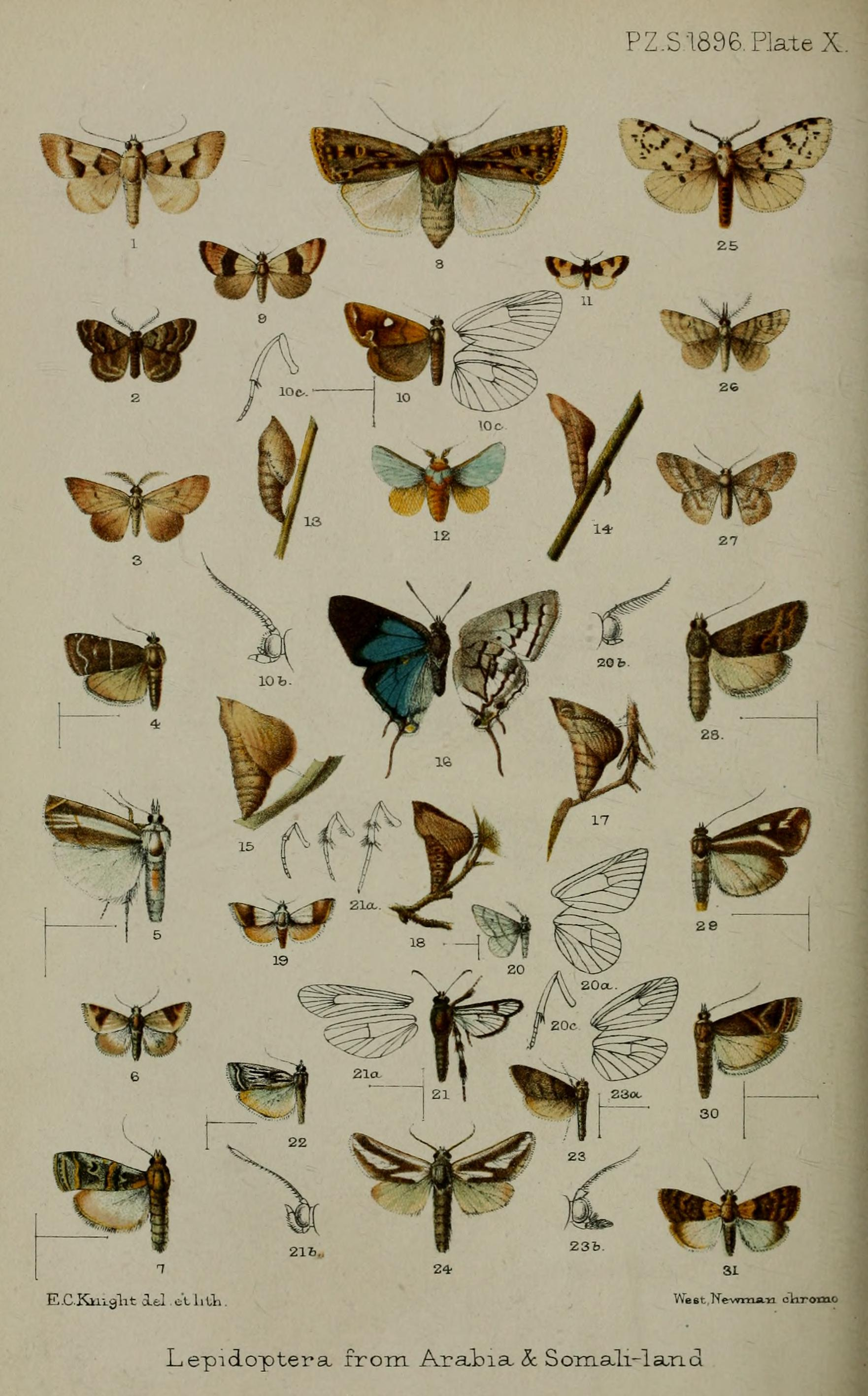
Lepidoptera collected by Nurse at Aden and in Somaliland

Nurse had a lifelong interest in birds and, as many naturalists did, collected butterflies and moths. His interest deepened after Lord Walsingham and George Hampson published "On Moths Collected at Aden and in Somaliland" in the Proceedings of the Zoological Society of London in 1896. This article was based on Nurse's specimens and species new to science were described. Nurse later widened his interest to other orders of insects, especially Hymenoptera. At this time, Indian Hymenoptera were neglected. Nurse described many new species and added greatly to knowledge of the group. Many Nurse Hymenoptera specimens were described by Charles Thomas Bingham, Peter Cameron, and Claude Morley in The Fauna of British India, Including Ceylon and Burma.

At Quetta, Nurse discovered the species of mosquito, Anopheles nursei, which was later shown to carry the malarial parasite.

== Collections ==
Most of Nurse's Lepidoptera collection from Aden, Baluchistan, and Somaliland was acquired by James John Joicey in 1919.

He presented his entire collection of over 10,000 Indian Hymenoptera specimens to the Natural History Museum, London, in 1920.

Nurse also bequeathed a collection of 3,000 Indian insects to the Natural History Museum.

By the will of the late Lieut.-Col. C. G. Nurse, the Trustees of the British Museum (Natural History) have received a bequest of 3,000 Indian insects mostly obtained at Quetta, Deesa and Jubbulpore, where Col. Nurse served with the Indian Army. Col. Nurse was one of the small band of naturalists among military officers who devoted their leisure to the study of entomology, and was an enthusiastic collector of Hymenoptera, forming a large and valuable collection which he presented to the Museum a few years ago. The present bequest comprises the remainder of his Indian insects and includes about 1,450 Diptera (two winged flies), 1,300 butterflies, 130 dragon-flies and some others; of these the most valuable are the Diptera. The collection is especially rich in species of the family Bombyliidae, most of which are parasitic in the larval state on bees or wasps. Col. Nurse discovered and described fourteen species of this family which were new to science, and types of these are in the collection, as well as specimens of a number of other flies which were not previously represented in the Museum. Some interesting butterflies and other insects from Aden are included. – Nature, 1934.

== Societies ==
Nurse was a member of the Bombay Natural History Society (Managing Committee). He was elected a fellow of the Entomological Society of London in 1895 and a special life fellow in 1932.

== Eponyms ==
A species of snake, Myriopholis nursii, was named in his honour, as were the following insects:

Elis nursei (Tiphiidae), Glypta nursei (Ichneumonidae), Melcha nursei (Ichneumonidae), Xylota nursei (Syrphidae), Chrysis nursei (Chrysididae).

== Works ==
Partial list illustrating the diversity of Nurse's natural history interests:

- Nurse, C. G. 1891. A Journey Through Part of Somali-Land, Between Zeila and Bulhar. Proceedings of the Royal Geographical Society and Monthly Record of Geography. 13 (11): 657–663
- Nurse, C. G. 1899. Food of the Indian Grey Shrike. Journal of the Bombay Natural History Society. XII (3): 572
- Nurse, C. G. 1899. Birds Flying Against Window-panes. Journal of the Bombay Natural History Society. XII (3): 572
- Nurse, C. G. 1901. Sport and Natural History in Northern Gujarat. Journal of the Bombay Natural History Society. XIII: 337–342
- Nurse, C. G. 1902. New Species of Indian Hymenoptera. Journal of the Asiatic Society of Bengal. 70 (2): 146–154
- Nurse, C. G. 1902. Sandgrouse in Northern Gujarat. Journal of the Bombay Natural History Society. XIV (2): 387–388
- Nurse, C. G. 1902. Occurrence of the Red-breasted Merganser (Merganser serrator) near Quetta. Journal of the Bombay Natural History Society. XIV (2): 400–401
- Nurse, C. G. 1902. Unusual abundance of Sandgrouse at Deesa. Journal of the Bombay Natural History Society. XIV (1): 172–173
- Nurse, C. G. 1902. Merops apiaster Breeding in Baluchistan. Journal of the Bombay Natural History Society. XIV (3): 627
- Nurse, C. G. 1903. The Enemies of Butterflies. Journal of the Bombay Natural History Society. XV (2): 349–350
- Nurse, C. G. 1903. On New Indian Aculeate Hymenoptera. Annals and Magazine of Natural History. Series 7. 11: 393–403, 511–526, 529–549
- Nurse, C. G. 1904. Occurrence of the Common Indian Bee-eater Merops viridis in Baluchistan. Journal of the Bombay Natural History Society. 15 (3): 530–531
- Nurse, C. G. 1904. New species of Indian Hymenoptera Apidae. Journal of the Bombay Natural History Society. 15 (4): 557–585
- Nurse, C. G. 1906. Food of Monopis rusticella. Entomologist 9:160
- Nurse, C. G. 1910. Notes regarding the breeding of Cheilosia grossa. Entomologist 43: 313–314
- Nurse, C. G. 1922. New and Little Known Indian Bombyliidae. Journal of the Bombay Natural History Society. 28: 630–641
- Nurse, C. G. 1922. New and Little Known Indian Bombyliidae. Part II. Journal of the Bombay Natural History Society. 28: 883–888
