= Bury St Edmunds and Thetford Railway =

UK railway company

Great Eastern and Bury Saint Edmund's and Thetford Railway Companies Act 1878
- Act of Parliament
- Parliament of the United Kingdom
- Long title: An Act to authorise a sale of the Bury and Thetford Railway to the Great Eastern Railway Company, and agreements between that Company and certain neighbouring Companies; and for other purposes.
- Citation: 41 & 42 Vict. c. clxxv

Dates
- Royal assent: 22 July 1878

Text of statute as originally enacted

The Bury St Edmunds and Thetford Railway (B&TR) built the Thetford to Bury St Edmunds line from Thetford to Bury St Edmunds with assistance from the Thetford and Watton Railway. The railway was authorised on 5 July 1873 and opened on 1 March 1876.

Services were operated by the Thetford and Watton Railway until it was taken over by the Great Eastern Railway on 22 July 1878 under the Great Eastern and Bury Saint Edmund's and Thetford Railway Companies Act 1878 (41 & 42 Vict. c. clxxv).

The line was 12.75 miles (21 km) long with the journey taking just under 30 minutes.

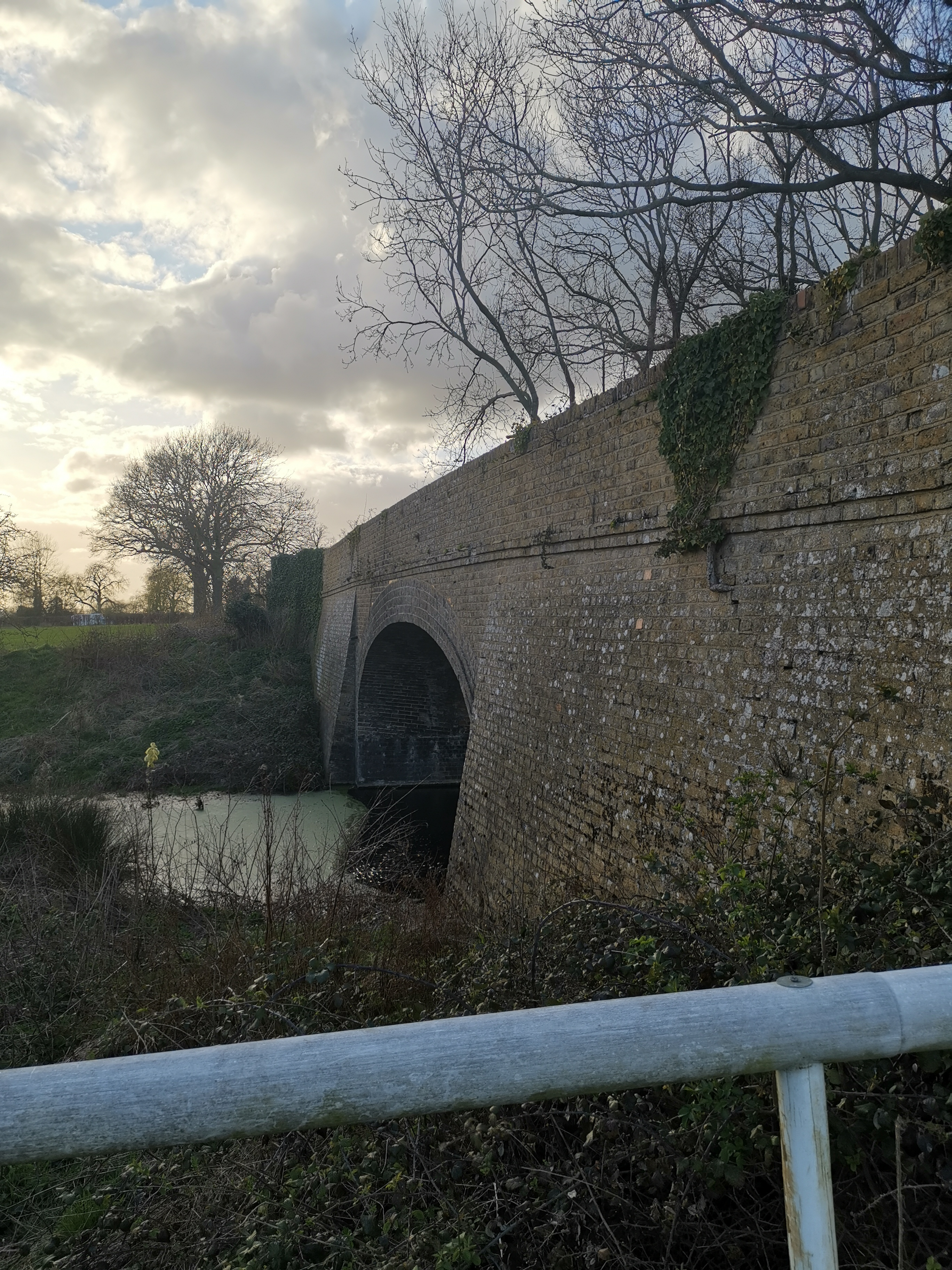
Railway bridge carrying footpath over the line the South of Ingham railway station

== See also ==
- Thetford to Bury St Edmunds line
