= Thetford to Bury St Edmunds line =

Railway line in United Kingdom

The Thetford to Bury St Edmunds line is a closed railway between Thetford in Norfolk and Bury St Edmunds in Suffolk, England. It was a single line railway of 12.75 miles (21 km).

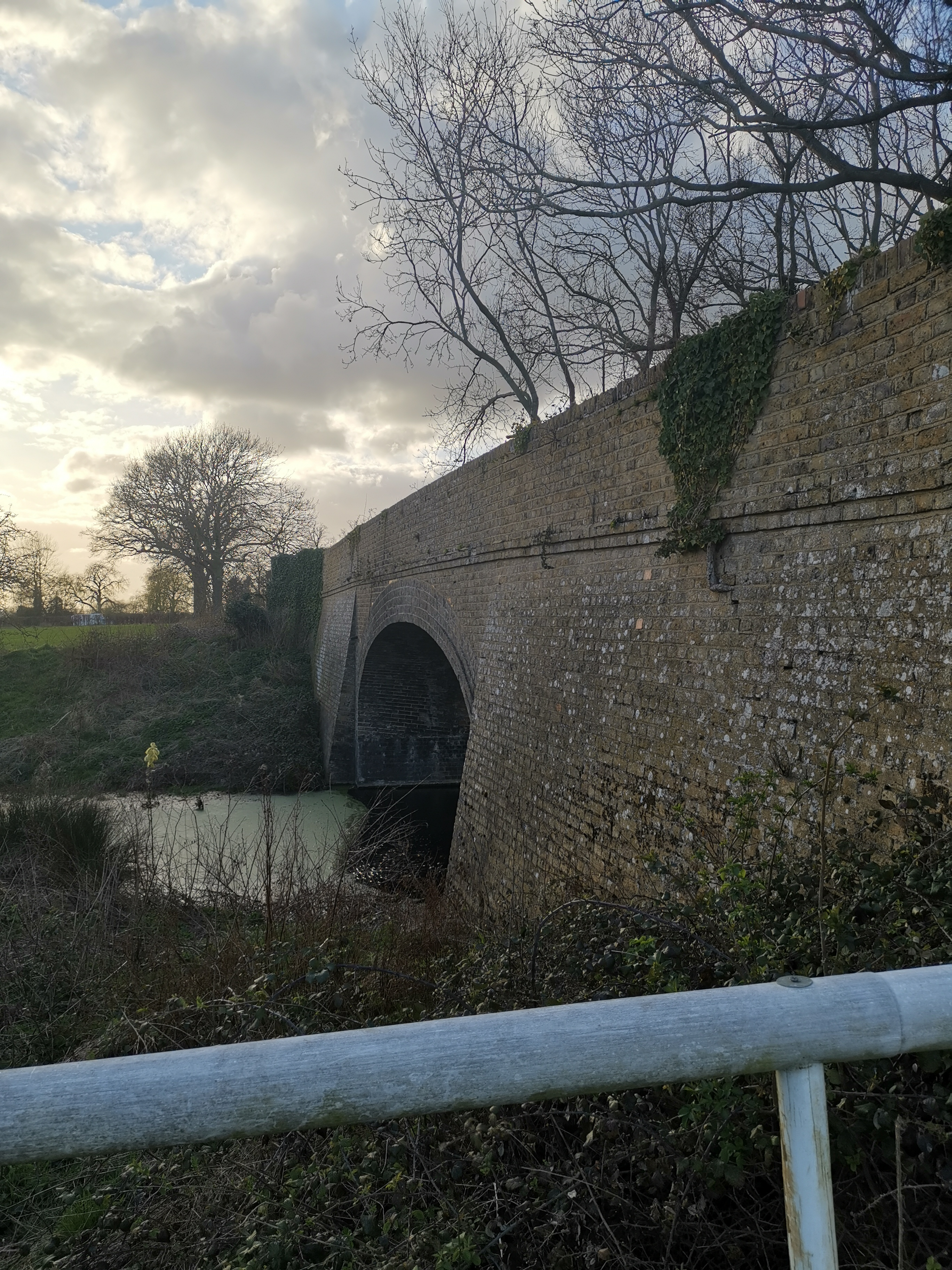
Railway bridge carrying footpath over the line the south of Ingham railway station in March 2020

== History ==
=== Early proposals and the Bury St Edmunds and Thetford Railway ===
Plans for a railway line between Thetford and Bury St Edmunds had existed since at least 1844, when proposals were made for the London and Norwich Direct Railway. These proposals aimed to connect London to Great Yarmouth via a line between Bury St Edmunds and Thetford. A bill was brought to parliament in 1845 but was ultimately not authorised. A further two bills including provisions for a line between Thetford and Bury St Edmunds were made in 1846 by different parties, but these were also unsuccessful.

Bury St. Edmunds and Thetford Railway Act 1865
- Act of Parliament
- Parliament of the United Kingdom
- Long title: An Act for authorizing the Construction of Railways from Bury St. Edmunds in the County of Suffolk to Thetford in the County of Norfolk; and for other Purposes.
- Citation: 28 & 29 Vict. c. cccxlviii

Dates
- Royal assent: 5 July 1865

By 1865, the Bury St Edmunds and Thetford Railway (BSE&TR) had come up with plans for a line, and proposed these in a bill to Parliament. It was initially opposed by the Great Eastern Railway (GER) on the grounds that there was a lack of necessity for the line. The bill passed as the Bury St. Edmunds and Thetford Railway Act 1865 (28 & 29 Vict. c. cccxlviii), and gave the BSE&TR five years to complete the route.

Bury St. Edmunds and Thetford Railway Act 1870
- Act of Parliament
- Parliament of the United Kingdom
- Long title: An Act to enable the Bury Saint Edmunds and Thetford Railway Company to make a Deviation in their authorised Railway; and for other purposes.
- Citation: 33 & 34 Vict. c. cxlvi

Dates
- Royal assent: 1 August 1870

Text of statute as originally enacted

The company ran into problems including financial difficulties and legal disputes with landowners, and proposed an amendment bill to parliament in 1870. It included deviations to the line, and a three-year extension to the deadline for the original route, and passed as the Bury St. Edmunds and Thetford Railway Act 1870 (33 & 34 Vict. c. cxlvi). The line was inspected and approved on 30 December 1875, after the implementation of some recommendations. Signalling and rolling stock issues delayed the start of services, with the line opening on 1 March 1876.

=== Great Eastern Railway operation ===
Initial services on the line relied on the GER for rolling stock, and the operation of the termini stations at Thetford and Bury St Edmunds. Income from the line was lower than expected, and the BSE&TR sold the line to the GER in 1878.

=== Closure ===
It closed to passengers on 8 June 1953 and goods traffic on 27 June 1960.

== Services ==
The line typically had four return passenger services and one freight working a day.

== Bibliography ==
- Paye, Peter (2020). Branch Lines to Thetford. Gloucestershire: Lightmoor Press. ISBN 9781911038771.
- Brodribb, John (2000). East Anglia (Branches & Byways). Oxford Publishing Company. ISBN 0860935493.
- R. S. Joby (1977). Forgotten Railways: East Anglia. Newton Abbot: David & Charles. ISBN 0715373129.
