= Bury and Thetford =

Thetford and Watton Railway Company
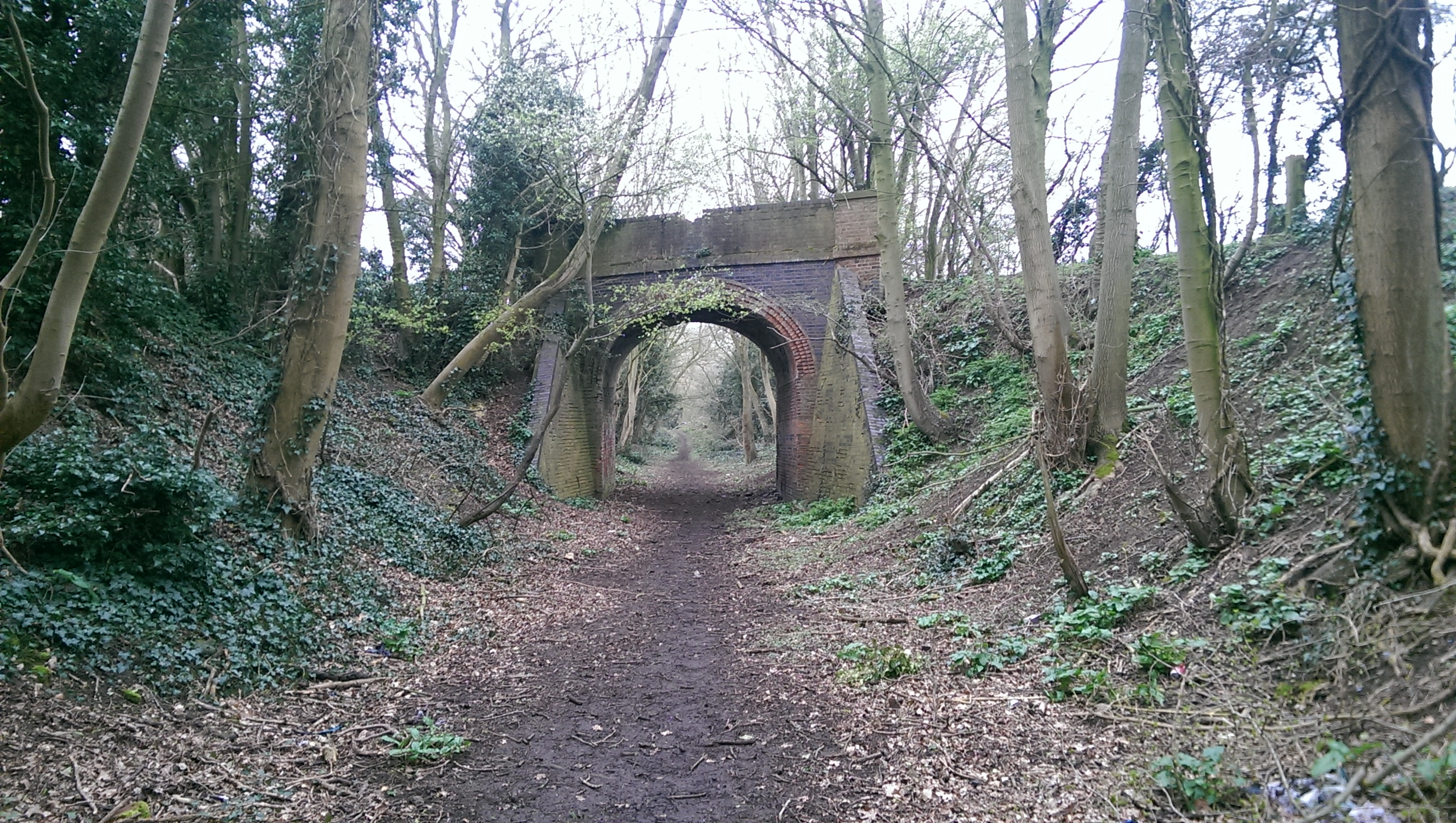
- Cutting near Swaffham

Overview
- Locale: England
- Dates of operation: 1869–1964 (passengers)
- Successor: Great Eastern Railway

Technical
- Track gauge: 1,435 mm (4 ft 8 1/2 in)
- Length: 18.75 miles (30.18 km)

The Bury and Thetford (Swaffham Branch), also known as the Crab and Winkle Line, was a railway line in England. The line ran from Thetford, via Watton to a junction with the Lynn and Dereham Railway at Swaffham.

Thetford and Watton Railway Act 1866
- Act of Parliament
- Parliament of the United Kingdom
- Long title: An Act for making a Railway from the Great Eastern Railway to Walton in the County of Norfolk, to be called "The Thetford and Watton Railway."
- Citation: 29 & 30 Vict. c. cxcviii

Dates
- Royal assent: 16 July 1866

Text of statute as originally enacted

Watton and Swaffham Railway Act 1869
- Act of Parliament
- Parliament of the United Kingdom
- Long title: An Act to incorporate a Company for extending the Thetford and Watton Railway to the Great Eastern Railway at Swaffham in Norfolk.
- Citation: 32 & 33 Vict. c. cxxi

Dates
- Royal assent: 12 July 1869

Text of statute as originally enacted

The first section, from Thetford to Watton, was authorised by the Thetford and Watton Railway Act 1866 (29 & 30 Vict. c. cxcviii), which gained royal assent on 16 July 1866. Freight services commenced in January 1869, with passenger services from 18 October 1869. Northward extension was authorised by the Watton and Swaffham Railway Act 1869 (32 & 33 Vict. c. cxxi). Nominally this established the Watton and Swaffham Railway as an independent venture to construct the continuation of the line, but effectively it was a subsidiary of the Thetford and Watton Railway Company. The extension to Swaffham proved to be technically challenging and cost £72,000, but was completed in 1875.

On 21 July 1879 the combined line was leased to the Great Eastern Railway for 999 years under the Great Eastern Railway (General Powers) Act 1897 (60 & 61 Vict. c. xcv), commencing 1 March 1880. It was vested into the GER in 1897, becoming part of the London and North Eastern Railway on 1 January 1923.

The line was closed to passengers on 15 June 1964, with a two-car diesel multiple unit (DMU) driven by driver David Grant of Dereham operating the final service. There were only 70 passengers on the final stage of the journey. Roudham Junction to Watton was closed completely at this time, and the remainder was closed to freight on 19 April 1965, after transporting the final sugar beet and coal traffic.

== Rolling stock ==
On opening, the railway was approached by Robert Fairlie, who wanted a line to test his "Fairlie Steam Carriage", but the railway company were not interested in this proposal. (Note: The Fairlie Steam Carriage was instead successfully tested in July 1869 at the Hatcham Iron Works.) Instead locomotives were obtained from Manning Wardle & Co. These were 0-6-0 tank locomotives with 3-foot driving wheels and 11-inch cylinders. The railway also secured a rebuilt 3 ft 6 in saddle tank. These locomotives were maintained at a shed at Watton.

Two more Manning Wardle tanks, and two Sharp, Stewart and Company 0-4-2 tender locomotives were added by September 1876. The railway was taken over by the Great Eastern Railway in 1880, with the locomotives joining the GER stock list. The Sharp locomotives being scrapped in 1891 and the tank engines in the late 1880s.

== List of stations ==
- Swaffham - line and station closed.
- Holme Hale - line and station closed.
- Watton - line and station closed.
- Stow Bedon - line and station closed.
- Wretham and Hockham - line and station closed.
- Roudham Junction railway station - line open, station closed.
- Thetford - line and station open.

== The route today ==
The line was lifted after closure. The route either side of Stow Bedon station has been removed, and the station site levelled. The section of line between Stow Bedon and Wretham was intended to be used for a new road, and Stow Bedon station was demolished as part of this plan. The road was not, however, constructed.

Watton station has also been demolished and the site redeveloped, although a level crossing gate survived on Church Road as late as 1983. The line from the junction with the Dereham line at Swaffham remains unobstructed, although with some bridges removed. Holme Hale station remains as a private residence, complete with signal box and signal post - although heavily extended.

=== Loch Neaton ===
One of the ballast quarries created during the construction of the railway through Watton was converted into a leisure park and bathing lake known as Loch Neaton. The area was named "Loch Neaton" in honour of the Scottish navvies who built the line, with Neaton being the local hamlet. The park remains today, bordered on one side by the abandoned railway embankment.
