= Weybourne =

Weybourne may refer to:

- Weybourne, Norfolk, England
  - Weybourne railway station
  - RAF Weybourne
  - Weybourne Windmill
- Weybourne, Surrey, England
- Weybourne Group, the family office of James Dyson
