= Muckleburgh Collection =

Military Museum in Norfolk, England

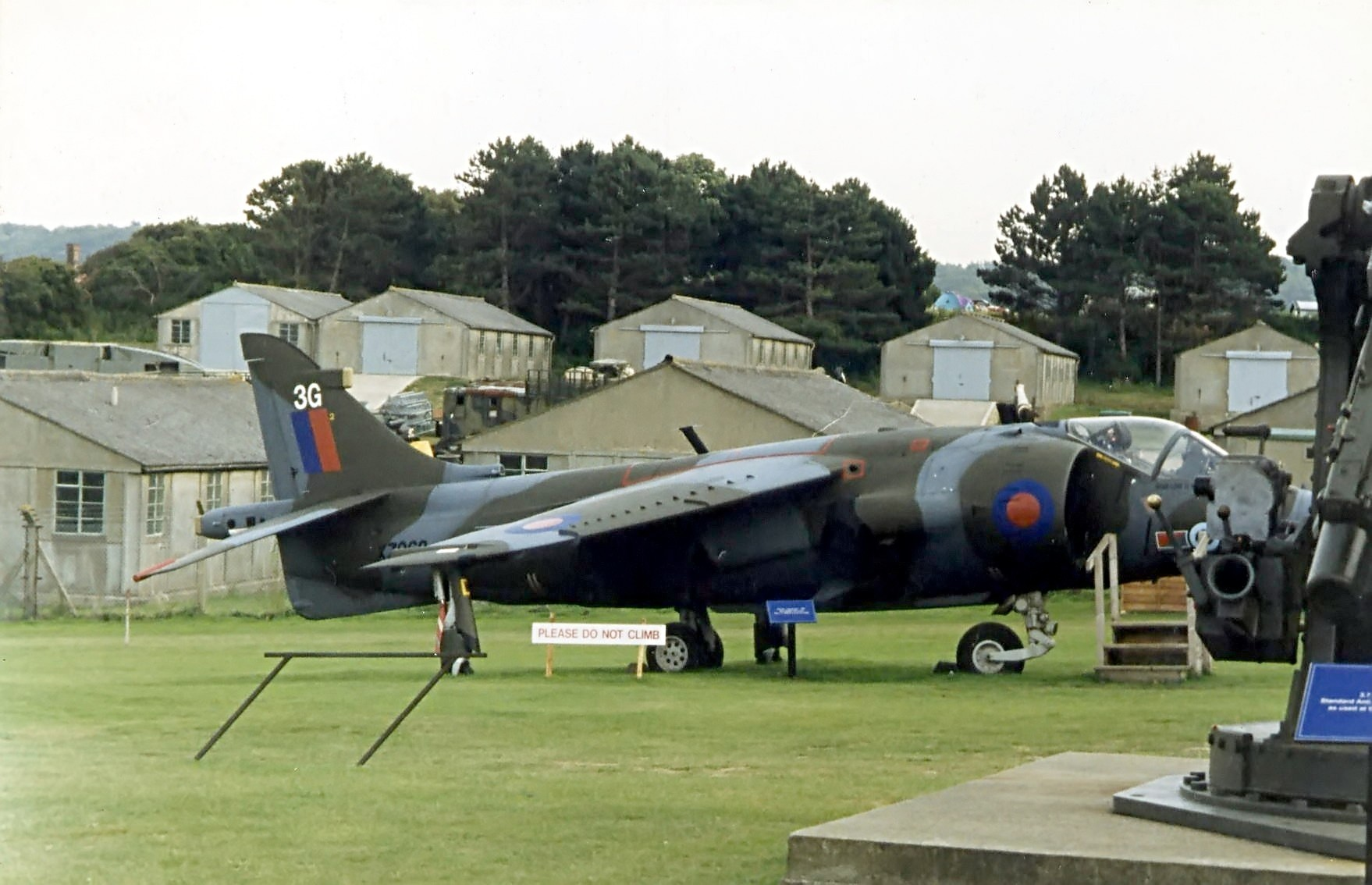
- Hawker Harrier GR.3 on display at the museum
- Established: 1988
- Location: On the A149 coast road near Weybourne, Norfolk, United Kingdom
- Coordinates: 52.944925°N 1.130662°E
- Type: Military Museum
- Website: Muckleburgh Collection

The Muckleburgh Collection is a military museum sited on a former military camp at Weybourne, on the North Norfolk coast, England. It was opened to the public in 1988 and is the largest privately owned military museum in the United Kingdom. The Muckleburgh Collection has been so named after Muckleburgh Hill at the foot of which it is situated.

== History ==
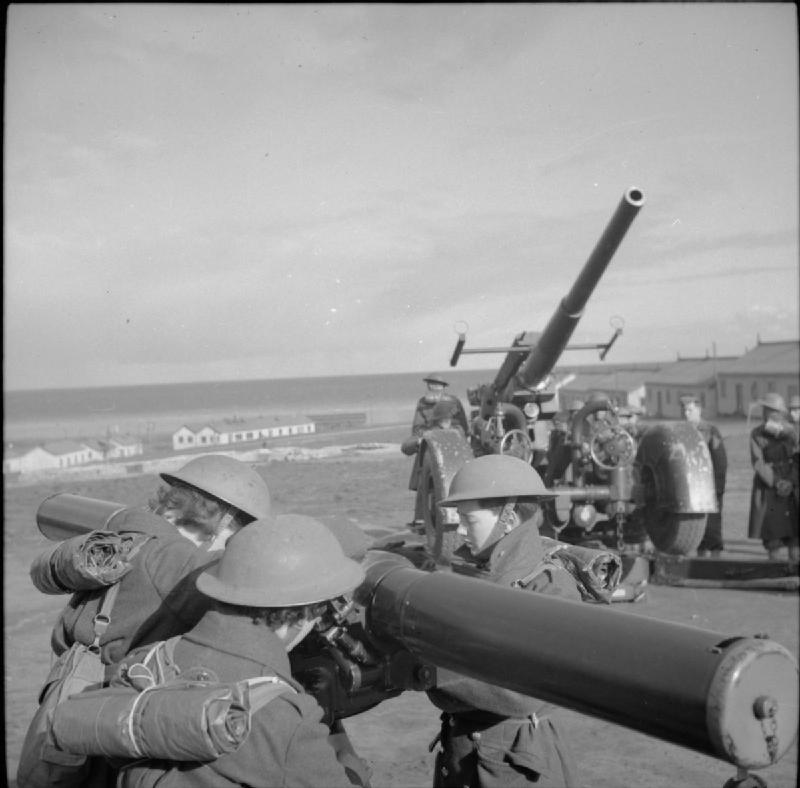
ATS women operate a rangefinder at the anti-aircraft training camp at Weybourne, 23 October 1941. A mobile 3.7-inch AA gun can be seen in the background.

The museum is located on the site of the Second World War and post-war Weybourne Anti Aircraft Training Camp. Weybourne Camp is north west of the coastal village of Weybourne. The site, originally called Carvel Farm, was first used in 1935 by the Anti–Aircraft Division of the Territorial Army as a summer training camp. In 1937 and as a result of the growing threat of war, it was decided to make the camp permanent and more fixed structures and defences were erected.

During the Second World War, the camp was surrounded by a perimeter anti-tank ditch and defended by a system of gun emplacements and barbed wire. The interior of the camp consisted of groups of Nissen huts, barracks and other military buildings. The cliff top to the north was covered by a line of heavy anti-aircraft guns and batteries, slit trenches and pillboxes. In 1941, the camp was visited by Winston Churchill, to view a demonstration of the Unrotated Projectile anti–aircraft weapon.

As the war progressed, defences at Weybourne Camp became more complex and were altered regularly and significantly and a grass airstrip was laid out, which remains in use.

After the war, the camp became known as the AA permanent Range and Radar Training Wing and gunnery training continued until 1958. The site still has a RAF radar receiving station and is the location of the University of East Anglia Weybourne Atmospheric Observatory and a Metrological Station.

== The museum ==
When Weybourne Camp closed, the site returned to private ownership and many buildings that were beyond repair were demolished.

The Muckleburgh Collection was founded by Squadron Leader Berry Savory and his son Michael Savory. At the time of the museum's opening in 1988, the principal display consisted of 30 vehicles and a small room describing the camp history. The museum has expanded to include over 150 artillery pieces, tanks and other vehicles, most of which are in working order.

The Muckleburgh Collection is home to the Suffolk and Norfolk Yeomanry collection, and numerous special displays. The vehicles, museum site, and its unspoilt 300 acres (1.2 km^{2}) has been used for television films, documentaries and dramas.

The museum offers rides in a military vehicle and hosts "tank driving" in a FV432. Among the 25 working tanks are a Panzer P-68, a Chieftain and a Stuart M5A1, a Soviet T-55 and a Canadian-built Sherman.

== Exhibits ==
=== Tracked ===
- A41 Centurion Mk5
- AMX-13
- Centurion ARRV
- Churchill Mk7
- Comet Mk 2
- FV101 Scorpion CVR(T)
- FV4201 Chieftain Mk5
- FV433 Abbot SPG (two)
- FV432 APC
- FV434 ARV
- FV438 Swingfire
- M24 Chaffee
- M47 Patton
- M16A2 White with Maxson quad 50 calibre MG
- M29 Weasel Cargo Carrier
- M4A1 Sherman 'Grizzly'
- M5A1 Stuart (Honey)
- MT-55 Bridgelayer
- Panzer PZ61
- Panzer PZ68
- Sexton 25Pdr SP
- T-34/85 MBT
- T-55 MBT
- Tracked Rapier SAM Launcher M74B
- Universal Carrier No2 Mk1
- ZSU-23-4 Shilka Anti-aircraft

=== Armoured ===
- BTR-40 APC
- Daimler Armoured Car Mk1
- Daimler Dingo Mk2 Scout Car
- Ferret Mk1/2 (two)
- FV1611 Humber Mk2 ('Pig')
- FV601 Alvis Saladin Mk2
- FV620 Alvis Stalwart Mk1 (two)
- Landsverk Unimog Scout Car
- M3A1 White Scout Car
- M8 Greyhound
- Alvis Saracen APC Mk1

=== Guns ===
- L118 light gun
- 105 mm L3A1 Pack Howitzer
- 12 Pdr Naval Gun Mk5
- L1 BAT
- QF 13 pounder Field Gun
- Argentine CITEFA 155 mm Field Gun M-77
- 155 mm gun M1 Long Tom
- QF 17-pounder anti-tank gun
- QF 18 Pounder field gun
- QF 2-pounder anti-tank gun (two)
- QF 25-pounder gun-howitzer & Limber
- QF 3.7-inch anti-aircraft gun
- QF 4.5-inch howitzer
- 40 mm Bofors L70 (two)
- 5.5-inch howitzer
- 57 mm AZP S-60 Anti-aircraft
- QF 6-pounder Anti-tank
- 7 Pdr Mark IV Armstrong Cannon
- 88 mm Flak 37
- FH70 155 Field Howitzer
- Flak 20 RH 202 (Rheinmetall)
- M1 155 mm Howitzer
- M56 105 mm Pack Howitzer
- Single 14.5 mm ZPU1
- Twin 14.5 mm ZPU2 (two)
- Quad 14.5 mm ZPU4
- 106 Recoilless Rifle

=== Support Vehicles ===
- 10 KVA Generator
- Orme-Evans No1 Mk1 Airborne Trailer
- Albion 10TonGS Workshop
- Austin 8 Staff Car
- Austin K5 GSA
- Austin K6 Breakdown Gantry
- Bedford QL 3 Ton
- Bedford Radio Van
- Brockhouse 20 ton Trailer
- Cranes 7.5 ton Trailer
- M416 jeep trailer
- M19 Gama Goat (three)
- M43 Dodge Ambulance
- Austin 12 Saloon Car
- Austin K2/Y Ambulance
- DKW Munga
- 90 cm Searchlight
- BSA M20 Motor Cycle
- Cable Trailer
- Chevrolet C8AT Portee
- Diamond T 981 Prime Mover
- Diamond T 967 Wrecker
- Ford GPA (Amphibian)
- Ford WOT 2
- Ford WOT 6
- M9 Rogers 45 Ton Trailer
- GMC CCKW 352 (Jimmy)
- Godiva Coventry Climax mobile Fire Pump
- Godiva Coventry Climax Fire Pump
- Leyland DAF GS
- Leyland Hippo Mk II
- Morris Commercial C8 FAT Mk3 (Quad)
- Praga 8 ton Mobile Crane
- SV/25 Scammell Pioneer
- Willys GPW jeep
- Russian ZIL-131 Water Tanker
- Fire Hose Reel Tender (two)

=== Missiles ===
- 9K11 Malyutka (AT-3 SAGGER)
- 9M113 Konkurs Wire-guided AT
- 9M37M Strela 10 SAM
- Bristol Bloodhound Mk2
- English Electric Thunderbird Mk2
- Replica Fieseler Fi 103 (V1 Doodlebug) with a section of the original Peenemünde launch ramp
- 9K35 Strela-10 SAM (SA-13 "Gopher")
- Javelin LML trainer
- Rapier Mk2 Launcher (& 15 test Missiles)

=== Radar ===
- Anti Aircraft Fire Control No3 MkVII
- Cymbeline mortar locating radar
- Green Archer mortar locating radar
- Local warning Anti aircraft No4 Mk7
- No11 Target Surveillance (Big Ears)
- No12 Height Finder (Noddy)
- Type 65 (two)
- Type 85
- Type 88 Target Surveillance

== Gallery ==
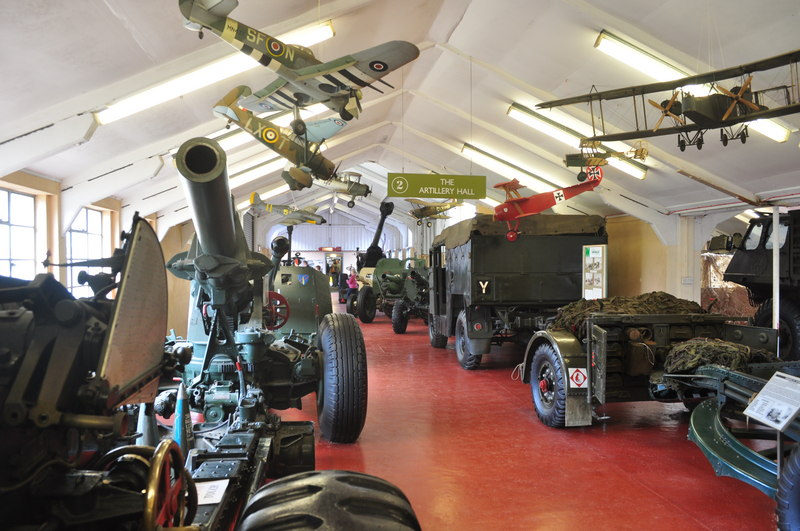
The Artillery Hall

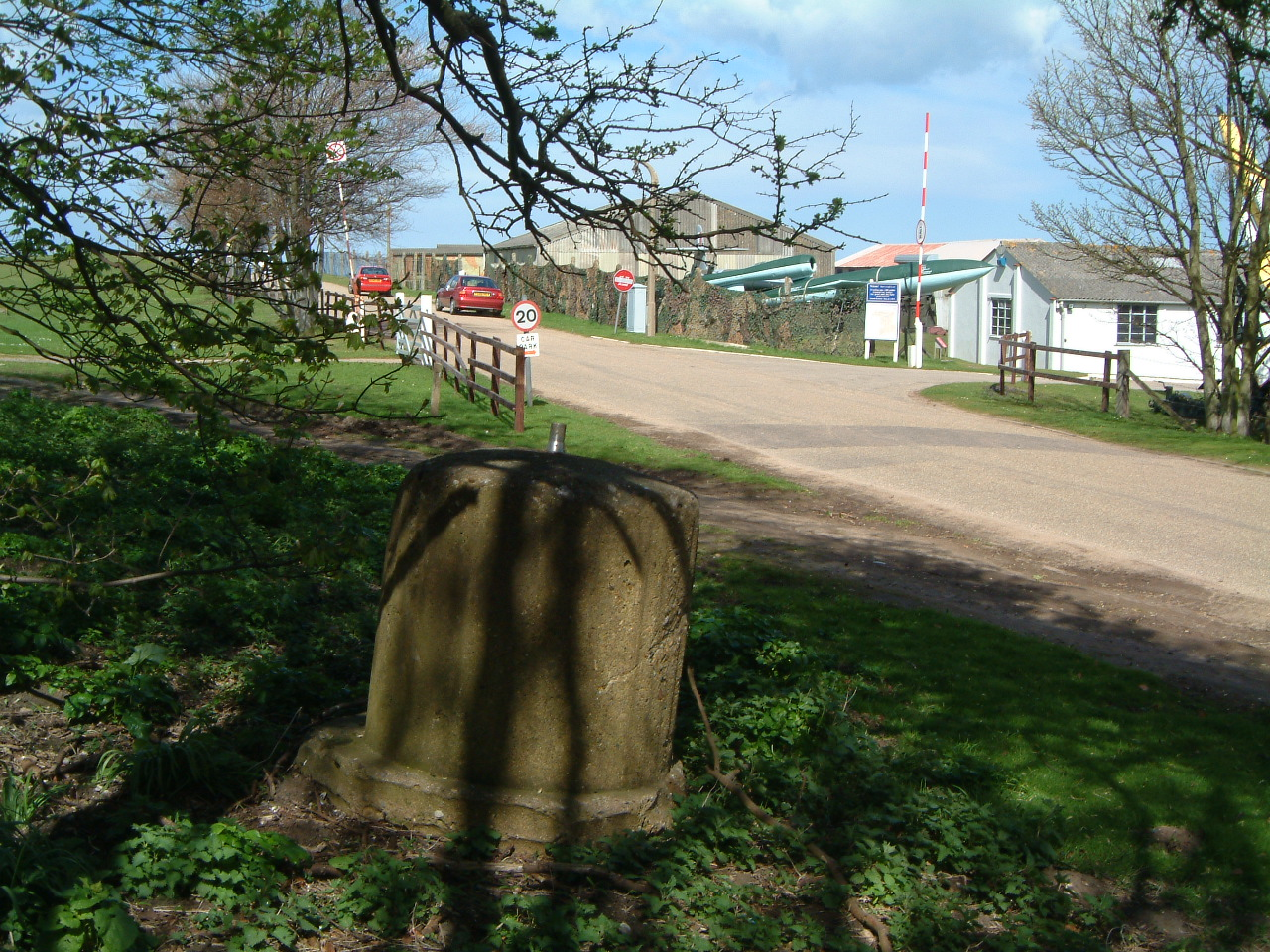
Entrance to Muckleburgh Collection

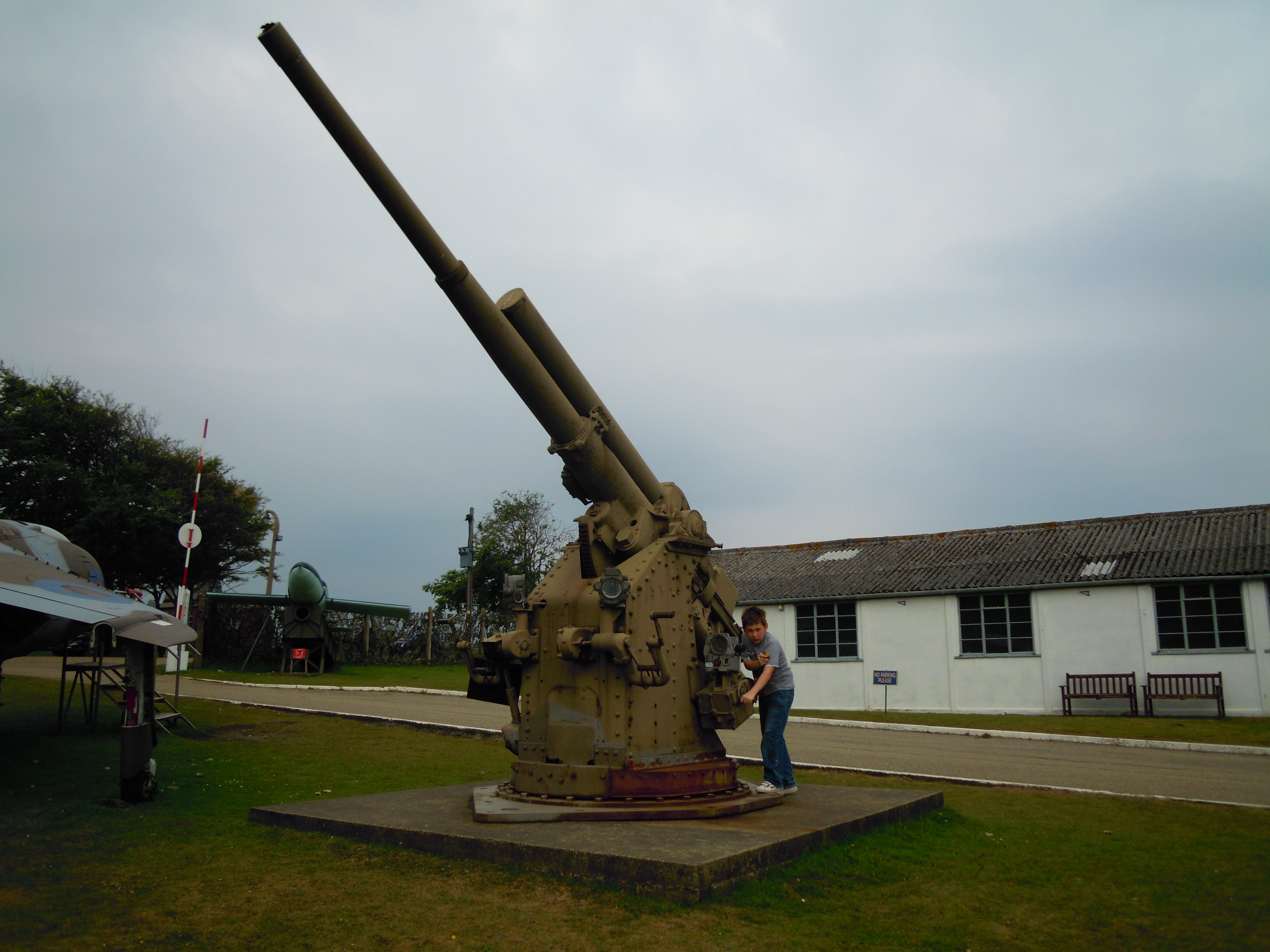
QF 3.7 Anti-Aircraft Gun

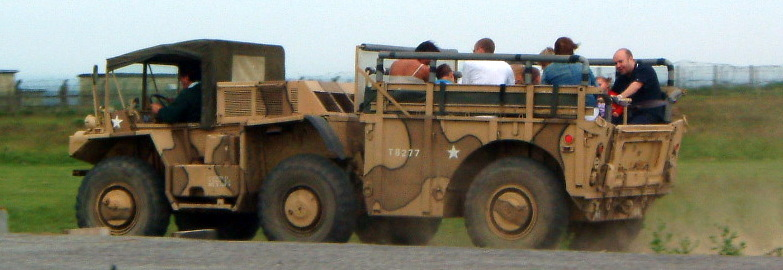
Gama Goat ride at Muckleburgh 2005

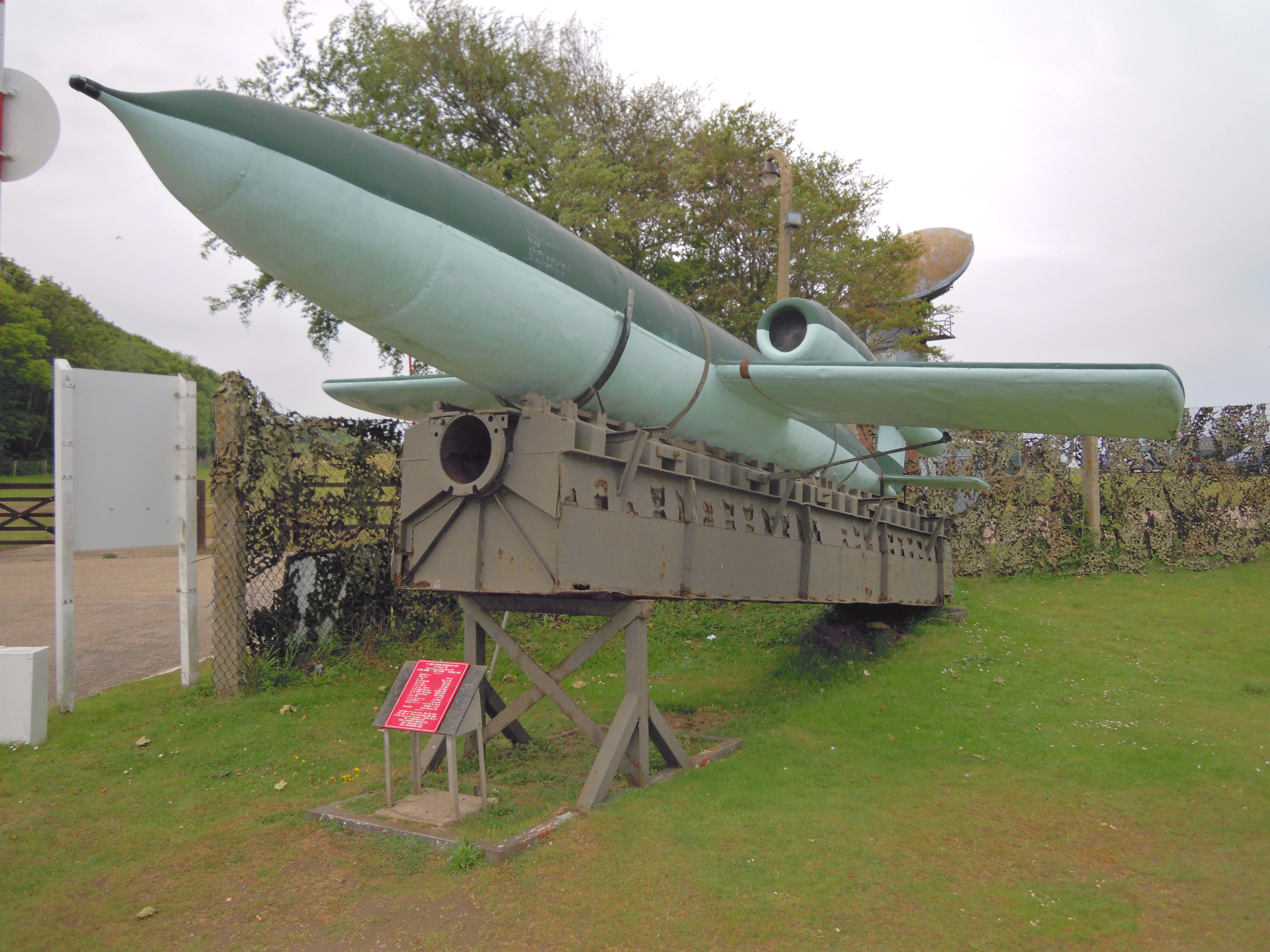
A replica V1 Flying Bomb, mounted on an original section of a launching ramp

== See also ==
- Michael Savory
- RAF Weybourne
