= Spring Beck =

Minor watercourse in Norfolk, England

Coordinates: 52°56′56.0″N 1°8′22.2″E

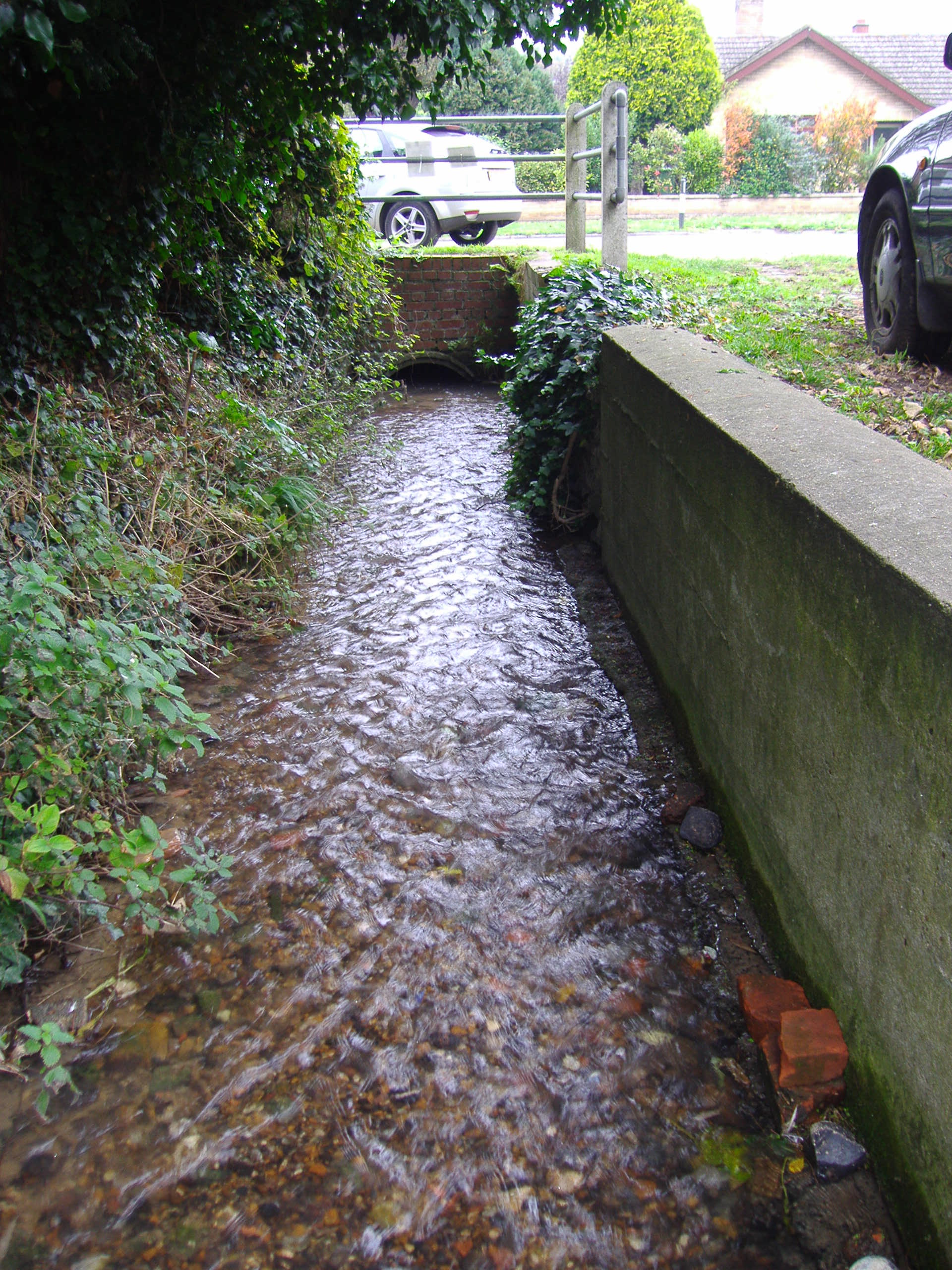
Spring Beck
Spring Beck at Weybourne
In Norfolk
Geography
Origin:	Hundred Acre Wood, Weybourne Pits
Grid reference:	TG 117 419
Mouth:	Into the Sea at Weybourne Hope
Grid reference:	TG 110 437
Length:	2.25 km long (1.4 miles)
Fall:	50 metres from source to tidal limit
Catchment Area:	Unknown
Tributaries:	None
Water Mills:	1 Weybourne Watermill

Spring Beck is a minor watercourse flowing near and through the village of Weybourne in the north of the county of Norfolk.

== Course of the beck ==
This short beck rises from a spring in a substantial hollow on the edge of Hundred Acre Wood in an area called Weybourne Pits, close to Weybourne railway station. From its source it flows under the track bed of the North Norfolk Railway and out across open farmland towards the village of Weybourne about 1-mile (1.6 km) away.

Spring Beck's original course flowed down Beach Road on the northern side of the village, and for a short way an upper overflow channel still does that. The beck's course was modified in the eighteenth century as part of the construction of a watermill and it was dammed to create a substantial mill pond.

The mill and mill pond can be found on Beach Road in Weybourne. Above the mill pond which is now very much silted up and overgrown with rushes, the beck runs round the side of the valley and crosses the A149 coast road near Weybourne Church, at a point some ten to fifteen feet above the lowest point on the road. It follows an artificial course from some way behind the village, through a site marked: "The Remains of the Priory" and then on to the mill pond.

Water no longer flows through the mill today: the flume is blocked with pre-formed concrete slabs. The spillway is similarly reinforced and conducts the flow round the boundary of the watermill to join the tailrace below. The beck then flows through a culvert under the road to meet the water coming down the road from the upper overflow channel, then out into the marshes behind the shingle bank, often flooding the car park at the end of Beach Road.

== Weybourne watermill ==
The watermill situated on Spring Beck is thought to have been built around 1729, at the same time as the miller's cottage, which has this date built into the wall. The buildings are constructed from beach flint and red brick and have a Norfolk pantiled roof; they are now a private residence. The watermill has not been in operation since the 1930s. The beck's course was diverted to supply the millpond and power the overshot waterwheel that operated the mill. The beck's natural course would have been down in the lower part of the gentle valley in which the village of Weybourne is located, probably alongside Beach Road. The diverted course takes a dogleg in the village and can be found to the west of the church and priory remains on higher ground. The millpond is now overgrown and silted up and the millrun has been blocked with concrete. The beck diverts around the old mill building today.

During the 19th century, this area of the coast had a reputation for smuggling. The watermill and much of the Weybourne area were owned by a man called William J. Bolding. It is reputed that he turned a blind eye to smuggled goods landed on the beaches bordering his property and was always duly rewarded with a couple of tubs left discreetly on the mill doorstep.

== See also ==
- Weybourne
- North Norfolk Railway

== Gallery ==
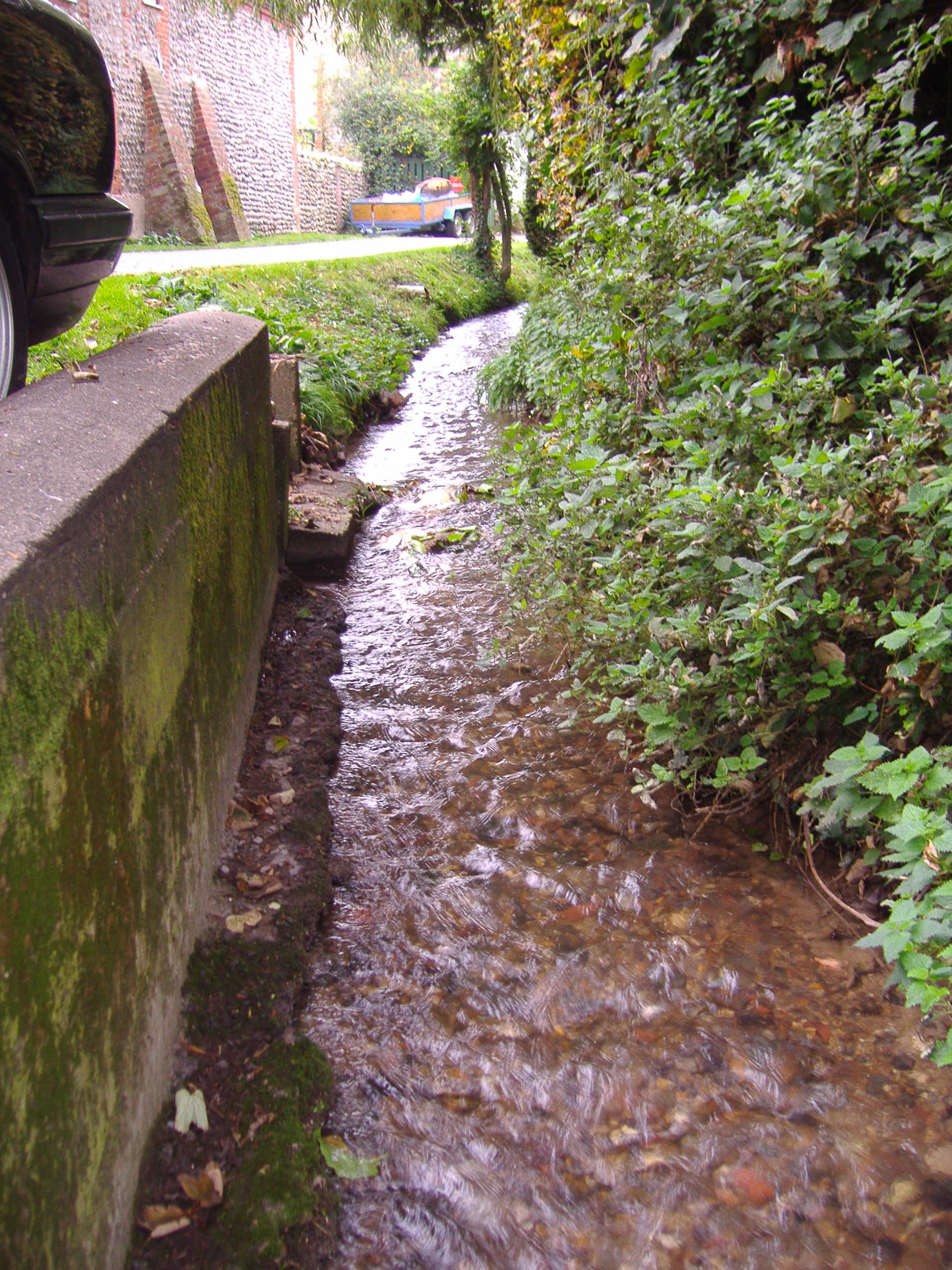
The Beck flows around Weybourne.

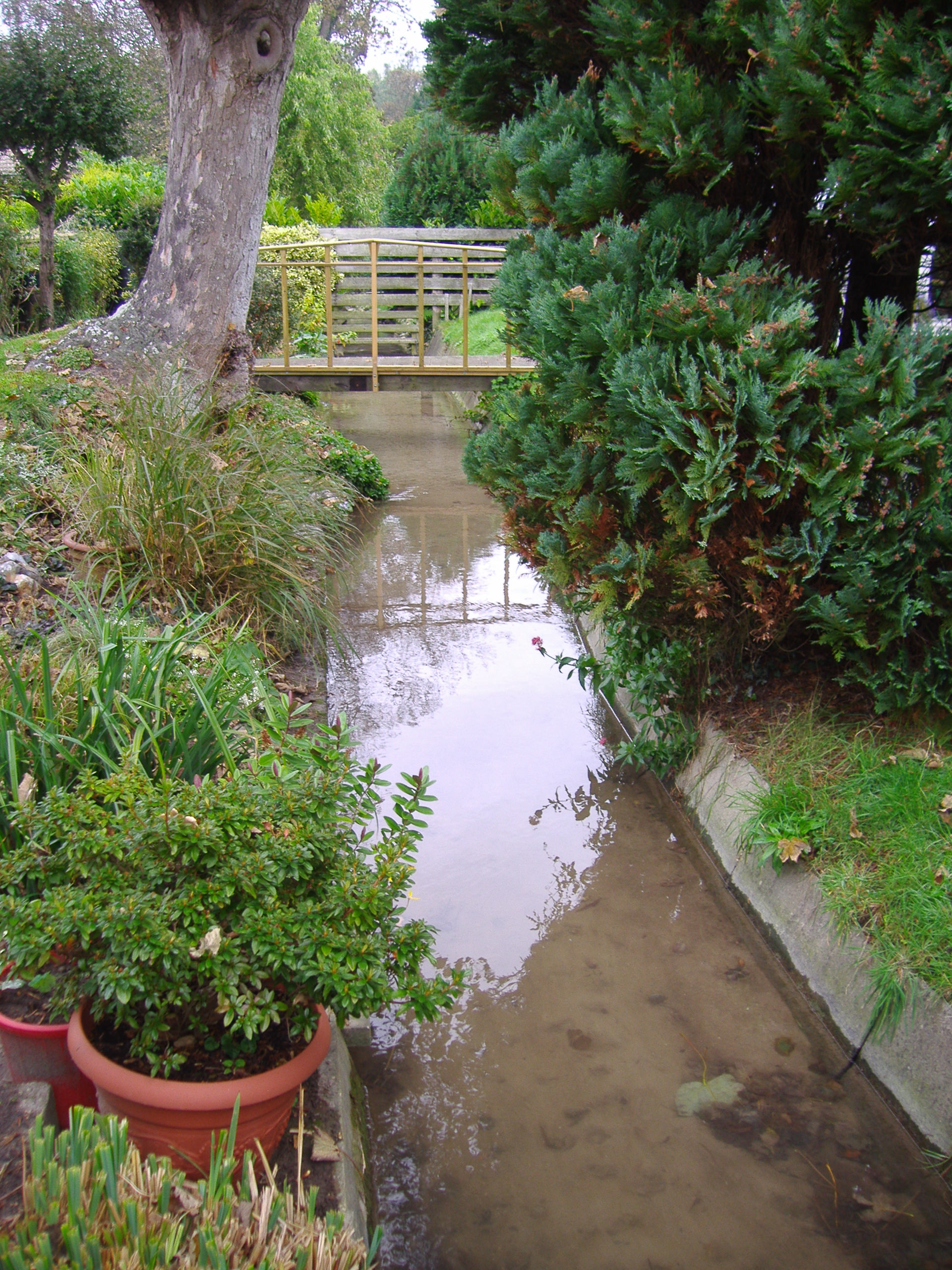
The Part of the beck which has been diverted some time in the past to fill the millpond for the Headwater for Weybourne Watermill.

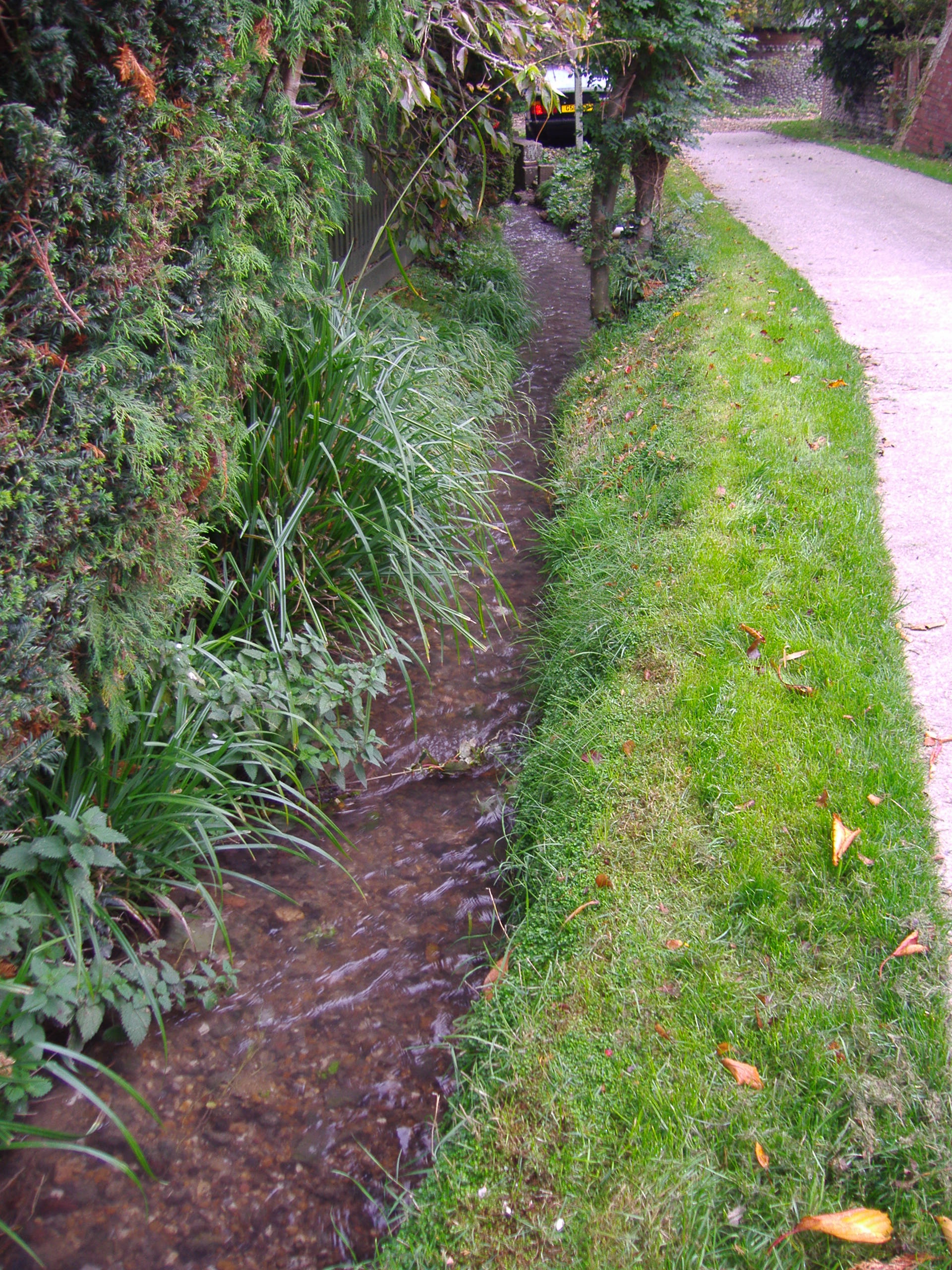
Spring Beck In the Village of Weybourne
