= Admiralty scaffolding =

Second World War anti-tank scaffolding

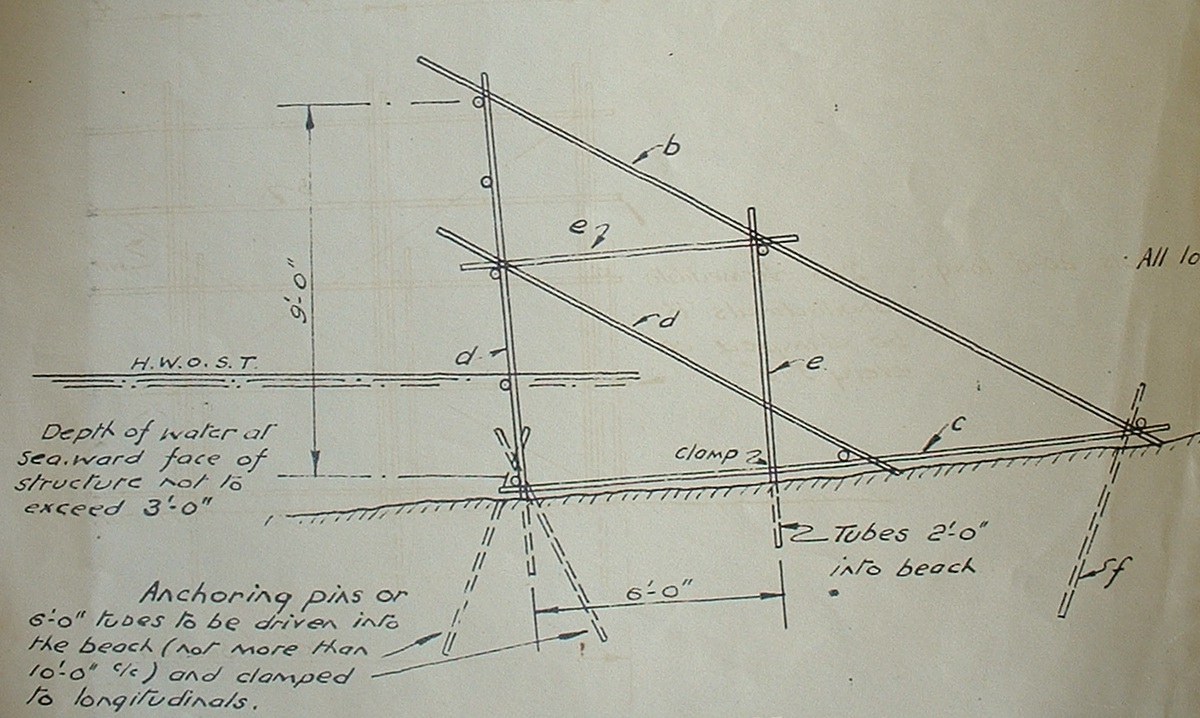
A drawing of Admiralty scaffolding from 1940

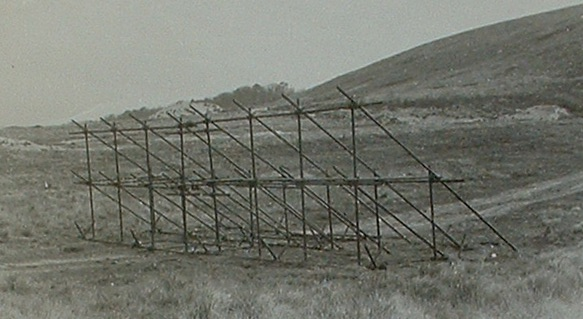
A section of Admiralty scaffolding prepared for testing

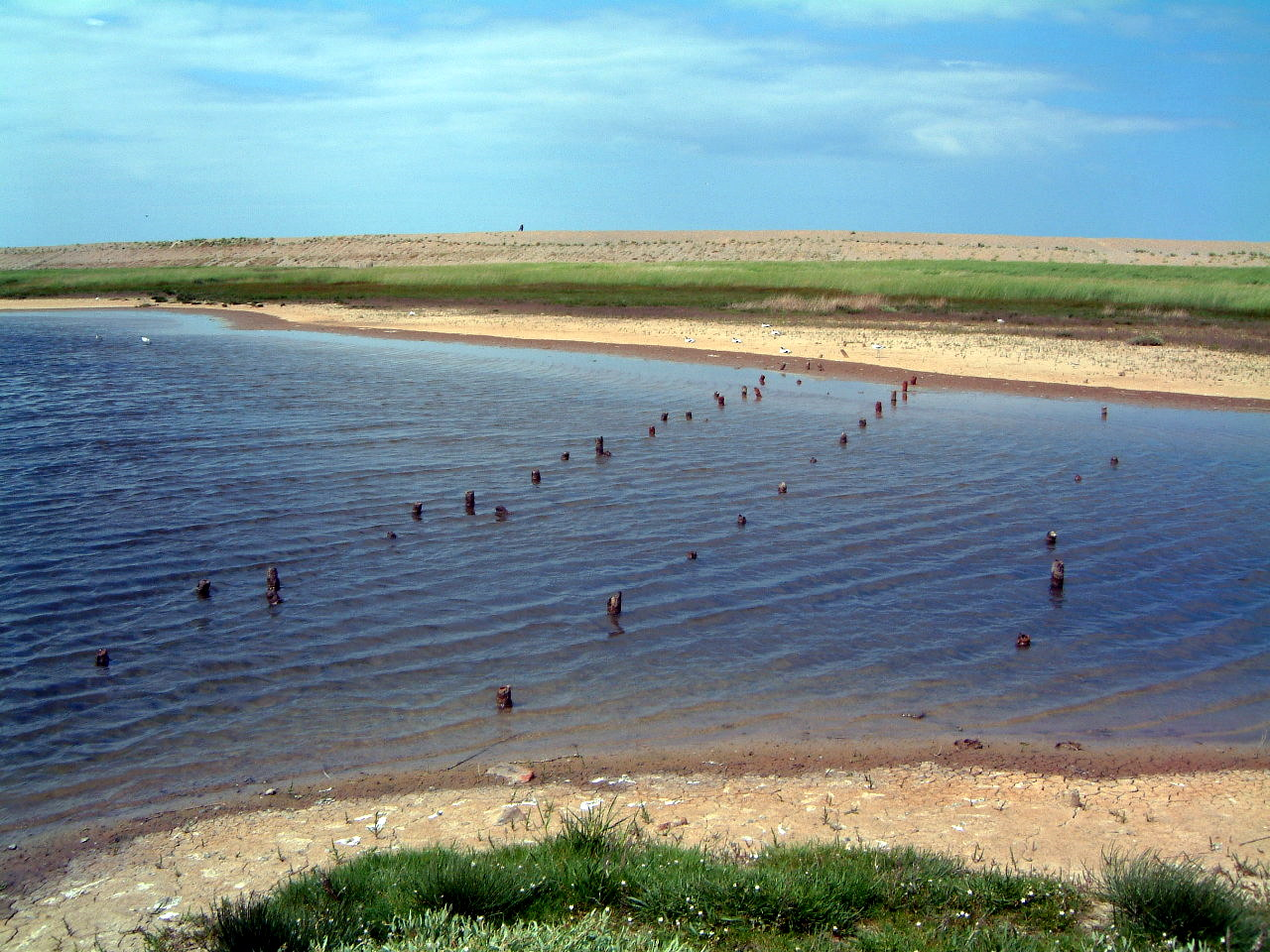
Extant remains at Salthouse, North Norfolk, England.

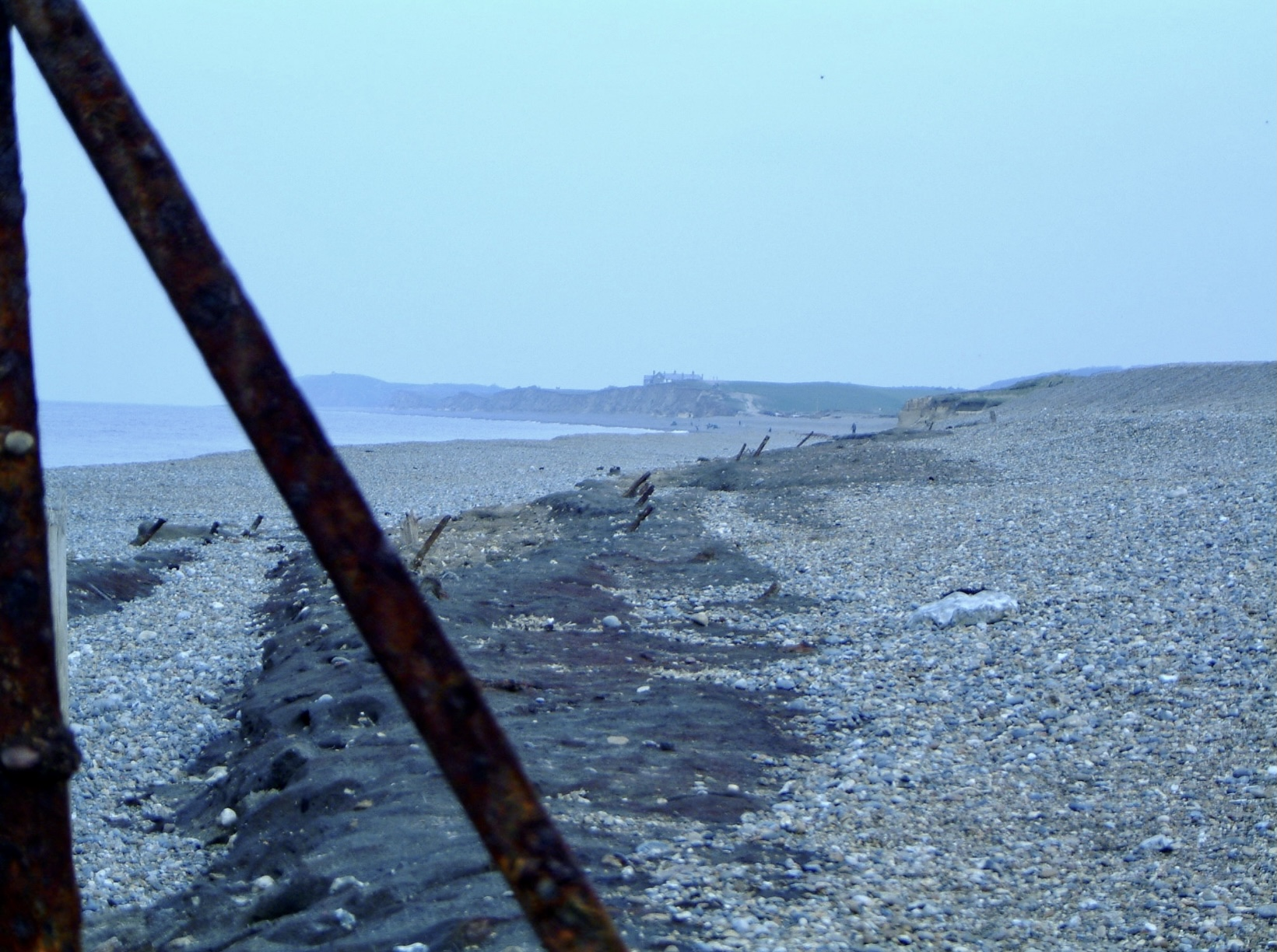
Exposed extant remains at Weybourne camp, North Norfolk, after the storm of October 2002

Admiralty scaffolding, also known as Obstacle Z.1, or sometimes simply as beach scaffolding or anti-tank scaffolding, was a British anti-tank and anti-boat obstacle design made of tubular steel. It was widely deployed on the beaches of southern England, eastern England and South West England during the British anti-invasion preparations of World War II, though scaffolding was also used, but more sparingly, inland.

== Design and use ==
Of a number of similar designs, obstacle Z.1 was by far the most common. This design comprised upright tubes 9 feet (2.7 m) high and 4 feet 10 inches (1.5 m) apart, connected by up to four horizontal tubes. Each upright was braced by a pair of diagonal tubes, at approximately 45°, to the rear. 20-foot (6 m) wide sections were assembled and carried to the sea to be placed in position at the half tide mark as an obstacle to boats.

However, trials found that a 250-ton barge at 5 1/2 knots (6.3 mph; 10.2 km/h) or an 80-ton trawler at 7 1/2 knots (8.6 mph; 13.9 km/h) would pass through the obstacle unimpeded, and a trawler easily pulled out one bay with an attached wire rope. Tests in October 1940 confirmed that tanks could only break through with difficulty. As a result, Z.1 was adopted as an anti-tank barrier for beaches thought suitable for landing tanks. As an anti-tank barrier, it was placed at or just above the high water point where it would be difficult for tanks to gain enough momentum to break through. In some places, two sets of scaffolding were set up: one in the water against boats, and one at high water against tanks.

The problem of securing the barriers on sand was overcome by Stewarts & Lloyds' development of the "sword picket"– This device was later known at the Admiralty as the "Wallace Sword".

Barriers ranging in length from a couple of hundred feet to three miles were constructed, consuming 50% of Britain's production of scaffolding steel at an estimated cost of £6,600 per mile (equivalent to £320,000 today). Despite this, many miles of Admiralty scaffolding were erected using more than 15,000 miles (24,000 km) of scaffolding tube.

After the war, the scaffolding obstructed swimmers, and was subsequently removed for scrap. Remaining traces are very rare, but occasionally revealed by storms.

== See also ==
- British anti-invasion preparations of World War II
- British hardened field defences of World War II
