= Great Yarmouth – North Denes Heliport =

Heliport in Norfolk, England

North Denes Heliport
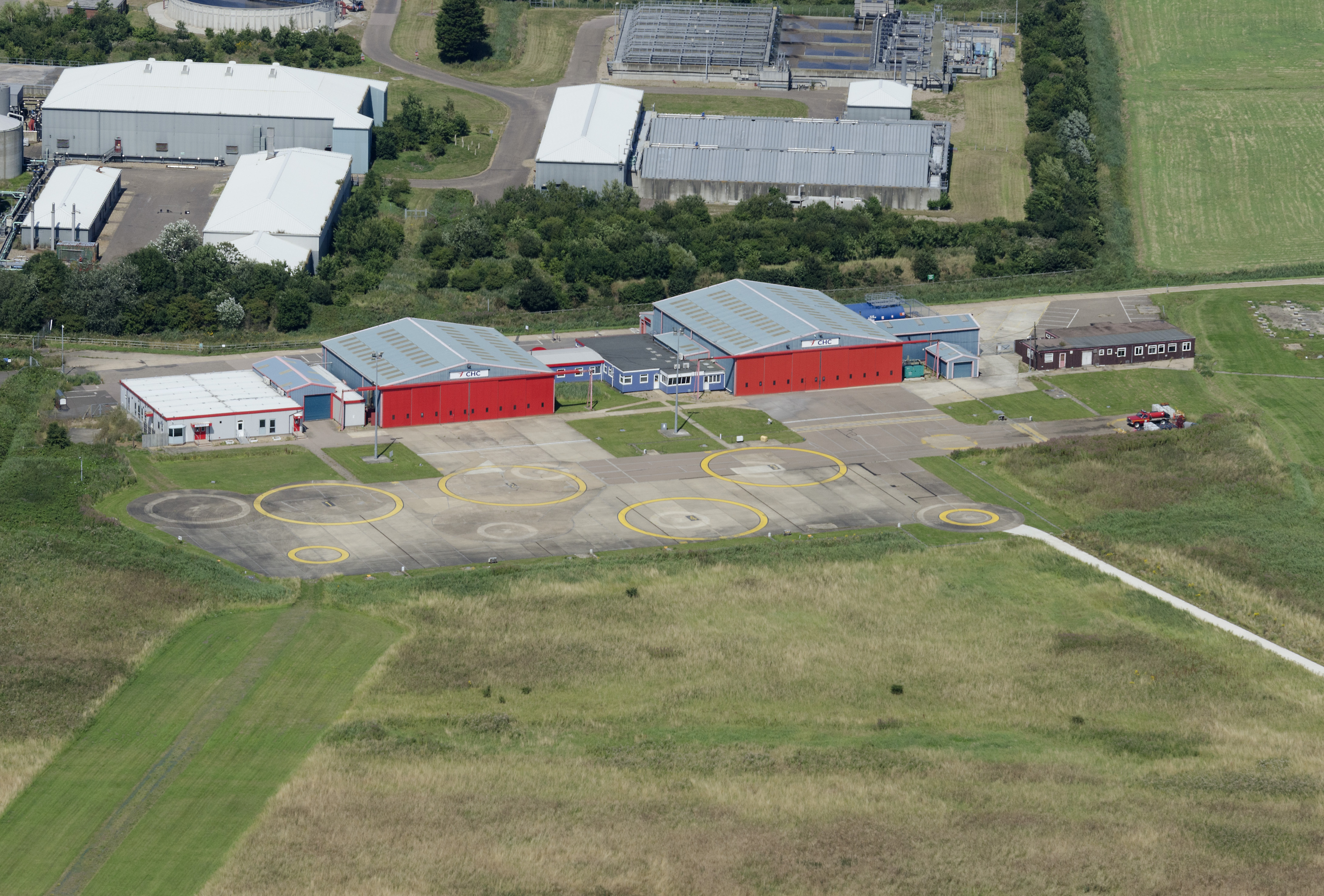
- IATA: none; ICAO: EGSD

Summary
- Airport type: Private
- Operator: CHC Helicopter
- Location: Great Yarmouth, Norfolk, England
- Elevation AMSL: 6 ft / 1.8288 m
- Coordinates: 52°38′11″N 001°43′23″E

Map
- Location in Norfolk

Runways
Direction	Length		Surface
Direction	m	ft	Surface
09/27	480	1,575	Grass
18/36	360	1,181	Grass

North Denes Heliport (ICAO: EGSD) is a heliport located in the northern suburbs of Great Yarmouth, just off the A149 next to Yarmouth Stadium in Norfolk, England. The heliport was formerly used as a base for services to the gas platforms in the southern North Sea. Fixed-wing aircraft were not permitted to use the heliport. The heliport was owned by CHC Helicopter, which operated several AgustaWestland AW139 helicopters.

== History ==
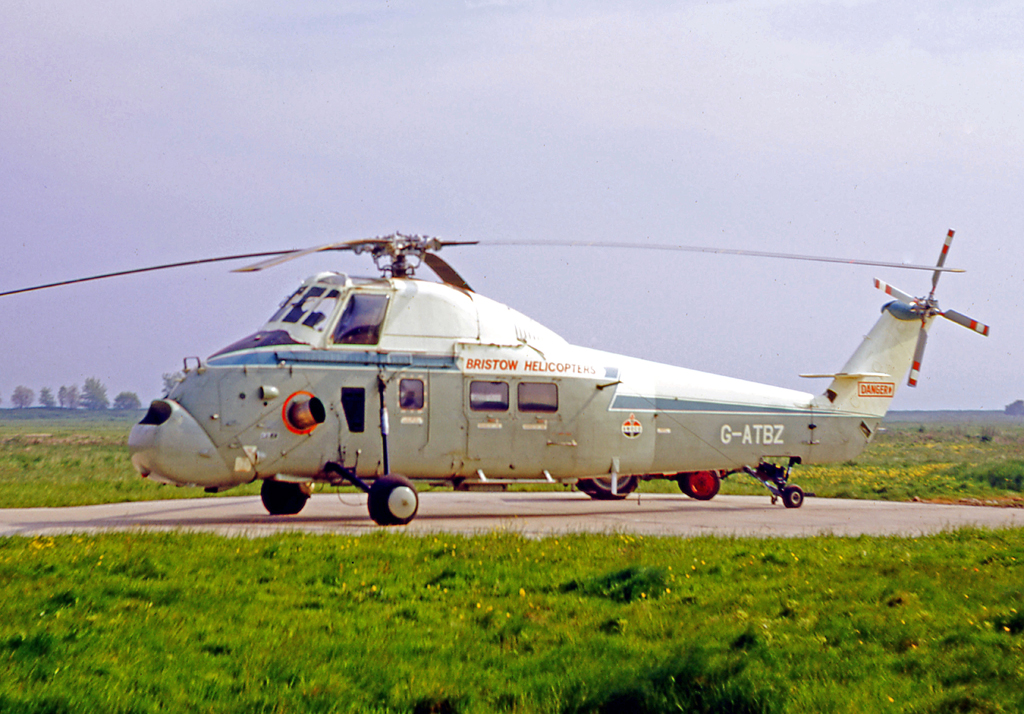
A Bristow Westland Wessex at North Denes in 1970

There had been private fixed-wing flying from North Denes since 1950, but helicopter flying began there on 22 April 1965, with the arrival of a Westland Whirlwind belonging to Bristow Helicopters, which had won the contract to fly personnel and equipment to Gulf Oil's drilling ship Glomar IV operating in the southern North Sea. The number of helicopters operating from there soon rose to six, with a staff of over 50. By the early 1970s Bristow was serving over 30 offshore installations, carrying more than 5,000 passengers a month. Bristow remained the main operator from North Denes, although Trinity House, British Airways, and the search-and-rescue helicopters from RAF Coltishall also flew from there. In 1990 Bristow celebrated 25 years at North Denes, having transported 181,377 passengers, 1,810 bags and 1,356 tons of freight that year. However, in 1997 Bristow began to operate flights from Norwich International Airport and Den Helder in the Netherlands, and in 1999 it relocated its operations entirely to Norwich. Bond Helicopters acquired some of Bristow's contracts, and became the main operator out of North Denes in 2000, before being acquired by CHC Scotia. In 2009, about 30,000 passengers passed through the heliport.

== Closure ==
CHC planned to close the heliport in 2011 with operations being moved to Norwich, but backed out of the plan to relocate, and instead invested more than £300,000 at North Denes. However, in early 2015, the heliport was deemed "uneconomical" and "un-viable" by CHC, and it announced the closure of the facility as a heliport.
