= Weybourne, Norfolk =

Village in Norfolk, England

Coordinates: 52.942°N 1.138°E

Weybourne
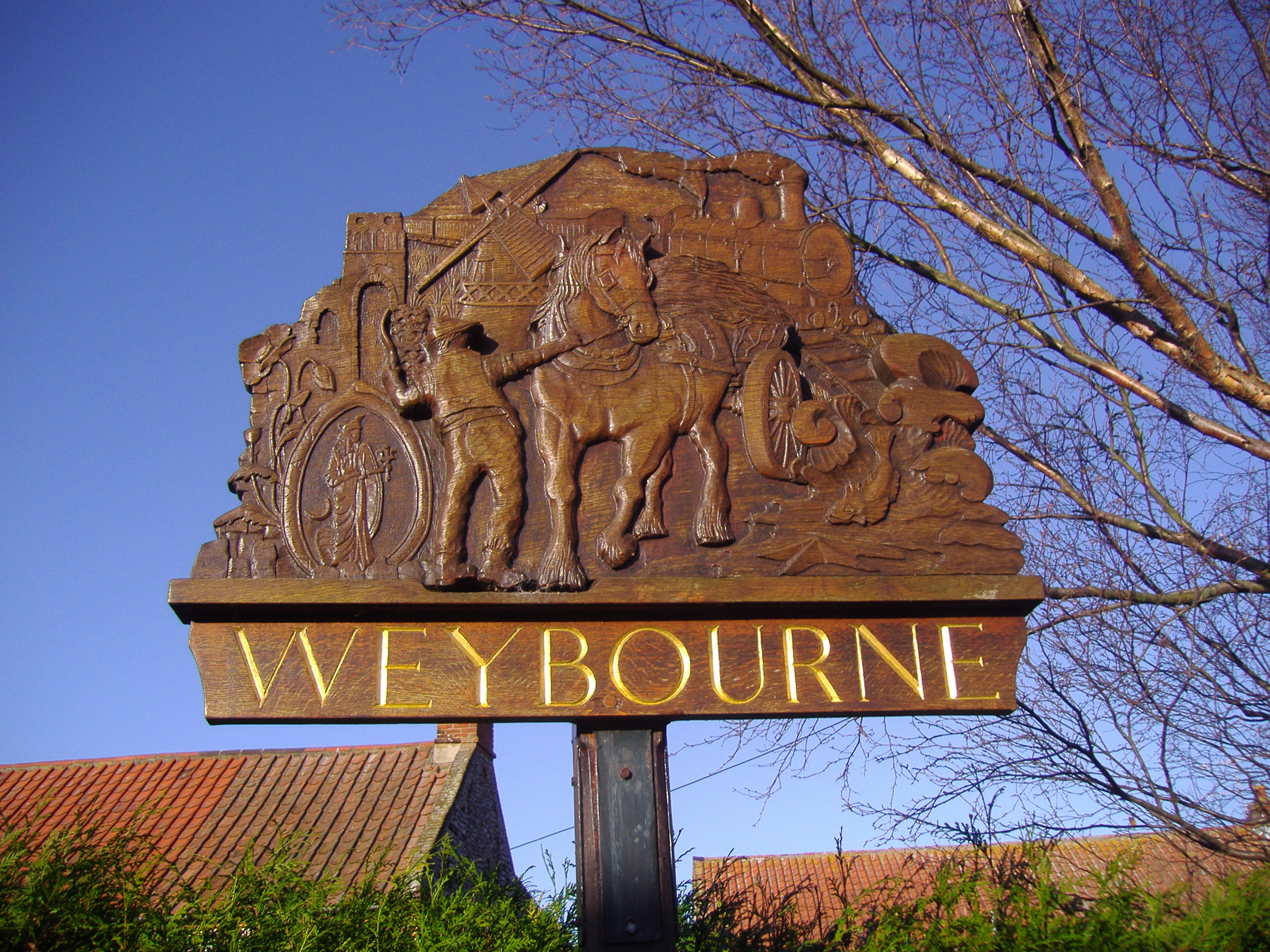
- The village sign

- Location within Norfolk
- Area: 6.91 km^{2} (2.67 sq mi)
- Population: 515 (2021 census)
  - Density: 75/km^{2} (190/sq mi)
- OS grid reference: TG1143
  - London: 131 miles (211 km)
- Civil parish: Weybourne
- District: North Norfolk
- Shire county: Norfolk
- Region: East
- Country: England
- Sovereign state: United Kingdom
- Post town: HOLT
- Postcode district: NR25
- Dialling code: 01263
- Police: Norfolk
- Fire: Norfolk
- Ambulance: East of England
- UK Parliament: North Norfolk

Weybourne is a village on the coast of the North Norfolk district, in Norfolk, England. The village is surrounded by arable fields, woodland and heathland. It lies 3 miles (5 km) west of Sheringham, within the Norfolk Coast National Landscape, and straddles the A149 coast road. The area is popular for its local countryside and coastline, particularly for walking, wildlife and bird-watching.

== Toponymy ==
The village's name origin is uncertain. The second element of the name refers to a stream or burn.. The specific may be a pre-English river-name, or perhaps, 'weir/mill-dam stream', although there is no evidence for the age of the mill pond here. It was suggested that "Weybourne meant 'felon stream'; a criminal (Note: The Old English word, now forgotten, was wearg.) might be executed there in the stream (or burn)".. Other suggestions, such as the Old English 'wearg', 'felon', 'wagu' and 'quagmire', are less likely. (Note: Search for 'Weybourne, Norfolk' in this website.)

In local dialect, Weybourne may be pronounced "Webburn" or "Webbun".

== History ==
=== Early history ===
Weybourne is mentioned in the Domesday Book of 1086, where it is called Wabrume. The remains of the Augustinian priory, founded around 1200 AD by Sir Ralph de Meyngaren (Mainwearing), stand on the site of a simpler Anglo-Saxon church. By 1494, one prior and three canons lived there: one canon complained that the priory was so poor it was unable to pay him his 20 shillings of annual pocket money. At a visitation in 1514, there was only one prior and one canon; this situation remained until King Henry VIII ordered the dissolution of the monasteries.

=== The coastline and smuggling ===
At Weybourne, the coast has an unusually steep shingle beach which was regarded as vulnerable to the threat of the Spanish Armada in 1588. The village was also a well-used location for smuggling items such as over-proof gin and pressed bales of tobacco. The coast between Sheringham and Weybourne was popular for landing goods because ships could anchor closer to the shore than anywhere else in the area. There was also a convenient gap in the cliffs through which goods could be easily transported.

Local folklore says that the miller would stop the Weybourne Windmill's sails in the form of a cross to warn the smugglers that the customs or coastguards were on to them; when the coast was clear he would set the sails going once more. On the beach, there was so little cover for the waiting land party that the men were reputed to bury themselves neck-deep in the shingle until the smuggling vessel appeared on the horizon. This story perhaps stretches credulity, but the fact that it is also told of Suffolk locations adds at least a little weight.

In the 1800s, William J. Bolding, the owner of Weybourne watermill and much of the local inland areas, reputedly turned a blind eye to goods landed on the beaches bordering his property, and was rewarded with contraband left discreetly on his doorstep. In February 1837, a Lieutenant George Howes and his men from Weybourne intercepted a large gang of armed smugglers at nearby Kelling. Many shots were exchanged and the coastguards recovered five horses with carts carrying 540 imperial gallons (2,500 L) of brandy and around 4,000 pounds (1,800 kg) of manufactured tobacco.

Volunteers manning the Rocket House saved the lives of many seafarers from the ships wrecked along the Weybourne coast:

- The crew of the coal ship Emily were not so lucky when it was lost; the master was the only survivor.
- In 1823, a brig from Naples, carrying a cargo of olive oil broke up, but six of her crew were saved. When the Norwegian barque Ida was wrecked, carrying pit-props to Cardiff, all the crew was rescued using a rocket line. The crew and some villagers salvaged some of the pit-props and it is said that many of these timbers survive in barns and cottages around Weybourne.
- In January 1915, the bodies of six sailors from the SS George Royle were washed up on Weybourne beach; there is a tombstone in the churchyard to their memory. The Rocket House is still extant, but is now a private residence.

Changes in government policy have led to the discontinuation of management of coastal erosion in North Norfolk.

=== Second World War ===
==== Defence ====
Weybourne has long been considered a possible site for invasion, one reason being the deep water offshore: "He who would all England win, should at Weybourne hope begin." During the Second World War, defences were constructed around Weybourne as a part of British anti-invasion preparations of the Second World War. The beaches were blocked by landmines and extensive scaffolding barriers; further inland there were pillboxes, barbed wire entanglements, a long anti-tank ditch and other defences.

==== Weybourne Camp ====
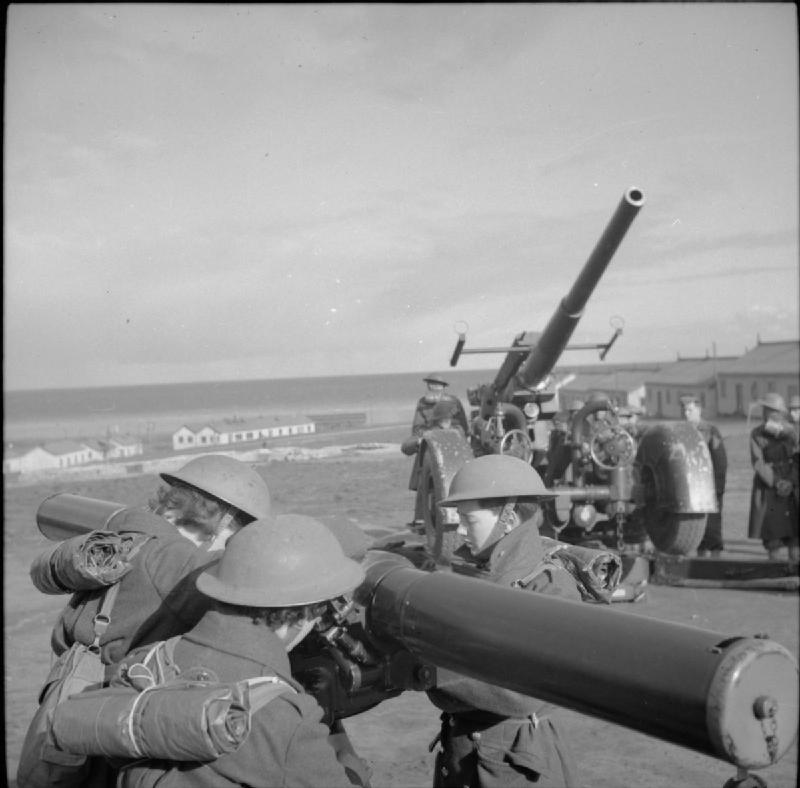
ATS women operate a rangefinder at the anti-aircraft training camp at Weybourne, 23 October 1941. A mobile 3.7-inch AA gun can be seen in the background.

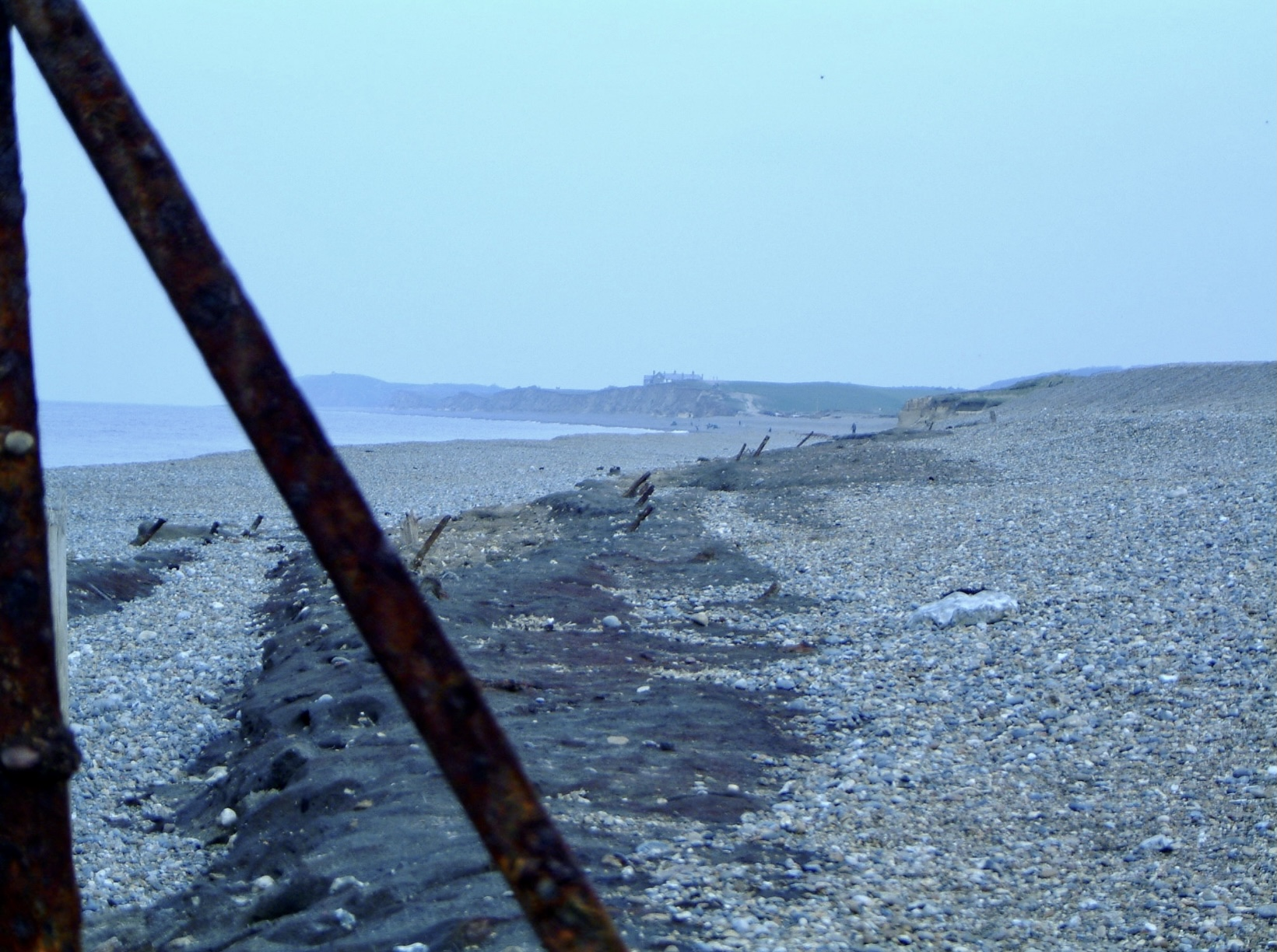
Exposed remnants of sea defences on the beach below Weybourne camp after storm of October 2002

Weybourne Camp was a highly secret site and was an Anti-Aircraft Artillery range. This, along with a complementary camp at Stiffkey, represented the main live-firing training ranges for Anti-Aircraft Command in the war. Here, the Norfolk coastline became a controlled zone by the British forces. This controlled zone extended 6 mi (10 km) deep into the North Sea around Norfolk. Weybourne Camp was a vital part of this zone.

It was visited by Winston Churchill twice in 1941. These visits took place after the Dunkirk evacuation when British defences were on high alert. During his first visit, a demonstration of projectile firing was carried out, but the result was most unsatisfactory. The prime minister gave the commandant just seven days to improve standards. On the second visit, each demonstration ended in failure until finally, a Queen Bee pilotless target aircraft was shot down and crashed close to the VIP enclosure. History has it that all the senior staff were replaced the following day.

== Mills ==
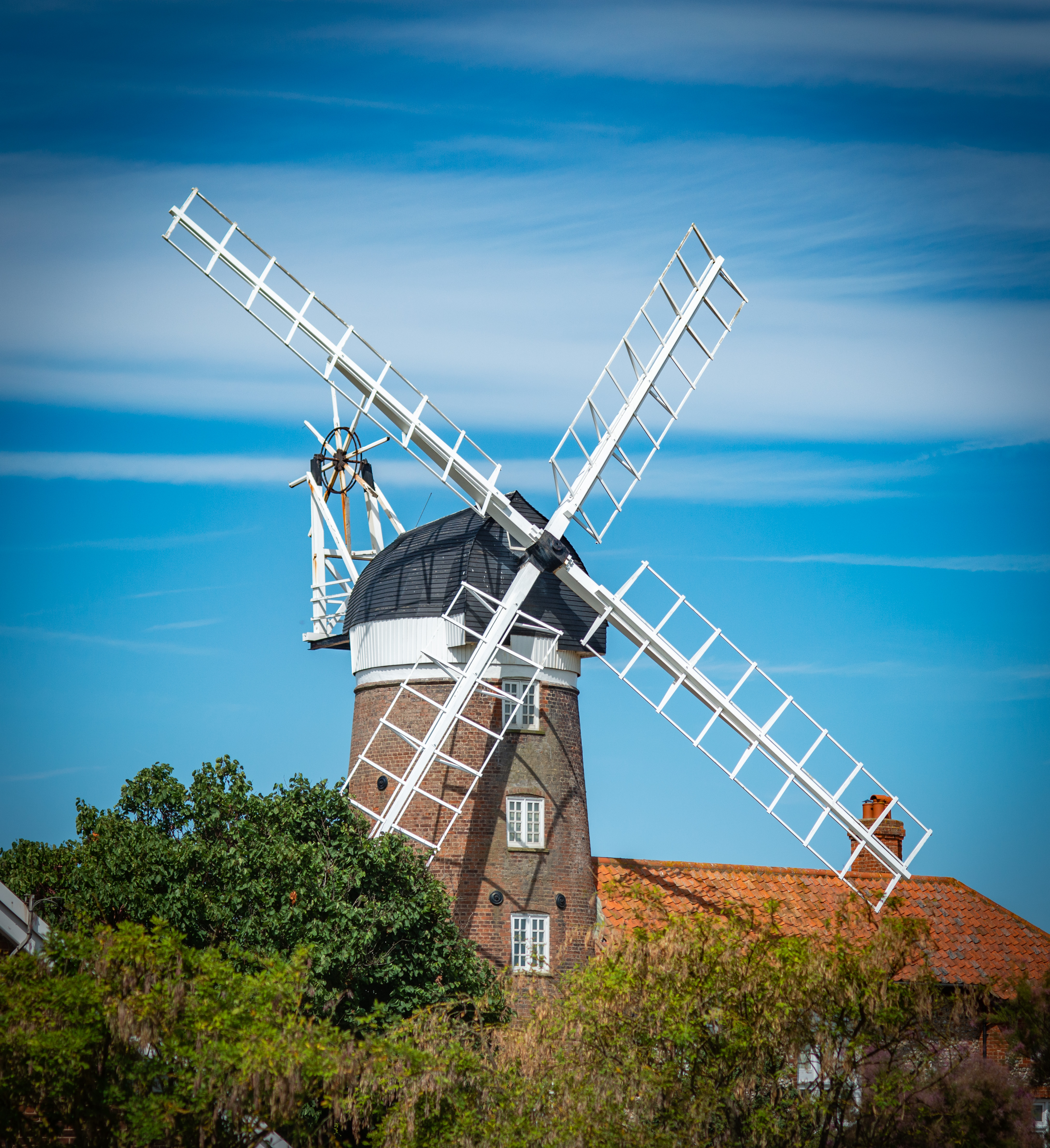
Weybourne Mill, from the beach

Weybourne Windmill is a fine example of a tower mill, built in 1850, that has been restored but not to working condition.

During the Second World War, suspicions arose in the village about the couple who lived at the mill; there were rumours that the residents were spying for the Germans. The man living in the mill was a Mr Dodds and his wife apparently had a strong foreign accent, which locals described as "like German or Austrian". One night, two local policemen were walking down the lane from the old coastguard cottages towards the mill, when they saw a light flashing from the top of the mill out towards sea. Apparently no action was taken – oddly, given the wartime conditions and the closeness to Weybourne Camp – but seemingly it bothered one of the policemen, who returned a couple of nights later and saw lights again. Some time later, Mrs Dodds left her bicycle unattended outside the tennis court; it fell over and a bag fell out of the basket. A local picked the bicycle up and then the bag; taking a look inside, he found a radio transmitter. He told the police and, a day or two later, the authorities arrived and took the couple away.

Weybourne also had a watermill, which was located on Beach Road.

== Amenities ==
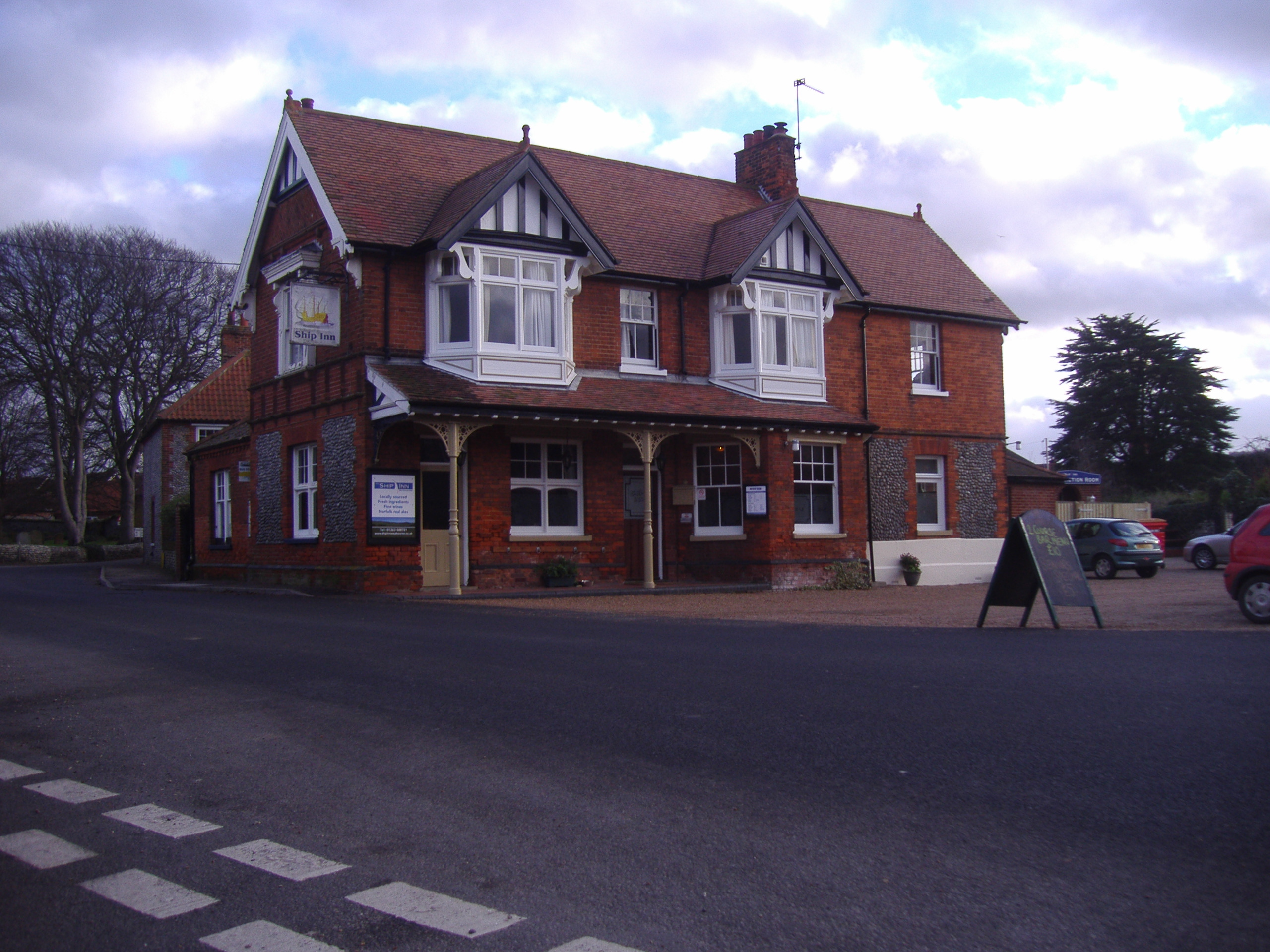
The Ship

The parish church of All Saints is Grade II*listed. The adjacent standing remains of the Augustinian Weybourne Priory are Grade I and the site is a Scheduled Monument.

There is a village shop, Weybourne Stores, and The Ship public house. The Maltings Hotel is located a few minutes' walk from the village centre, which provides accommodation.

== Transport ==
=== Railway ===
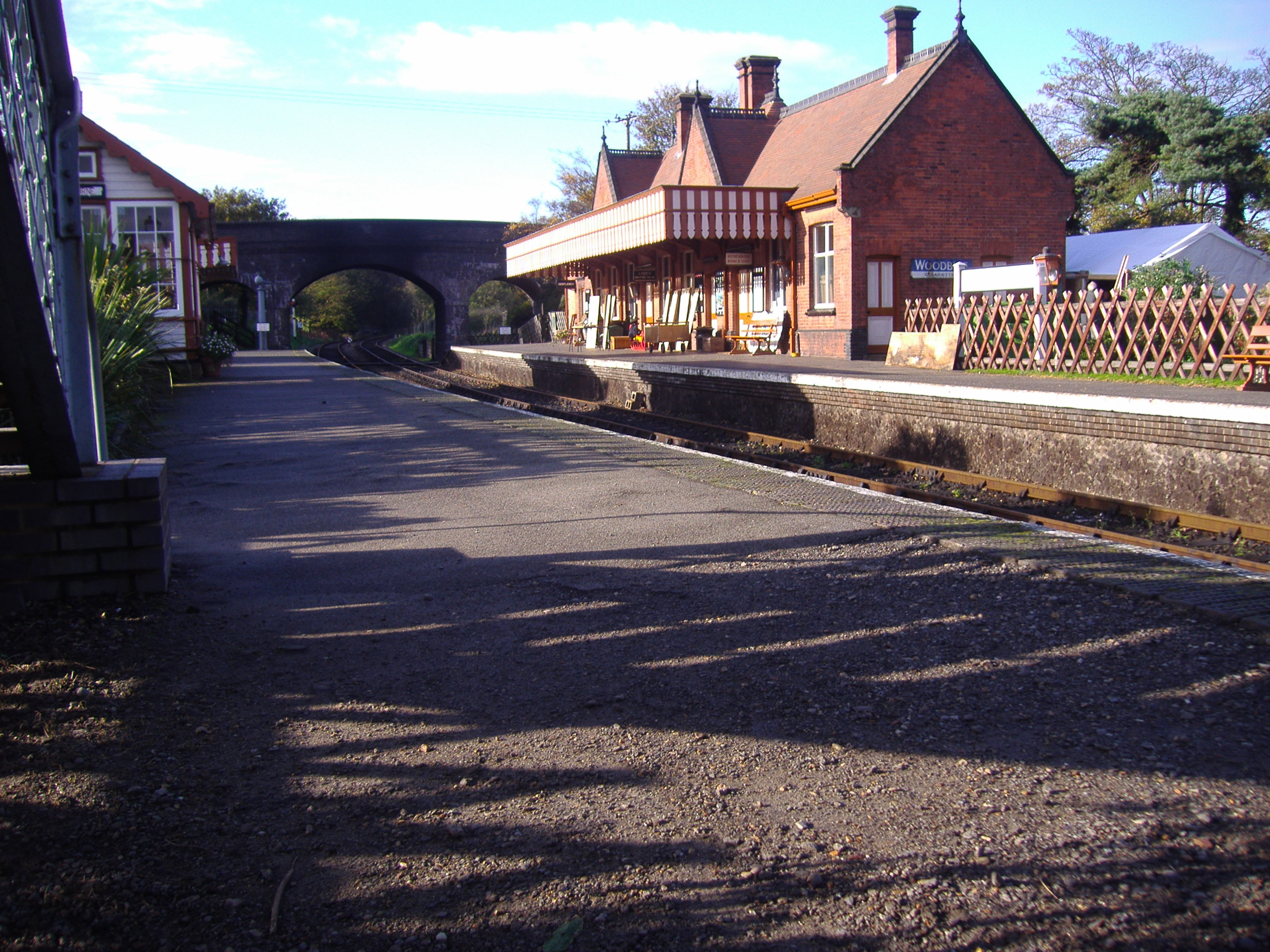
A view of the station building and the platforms

The North Norfolk Railway operates heritage services between Sheringham and Holt, via Weybourne; the route is also known as the Poppy Line. This well-preserved railway cuts through the countryside to the east of the village, which houses a locomotive shed with a carriage maintenance and restoration centre. The railway offers a 10 miles (16 km) round trip by steam train, or vintage diesel trains on some journeys, through an area of North Norfolk designated as being of outstanding natural beauty.

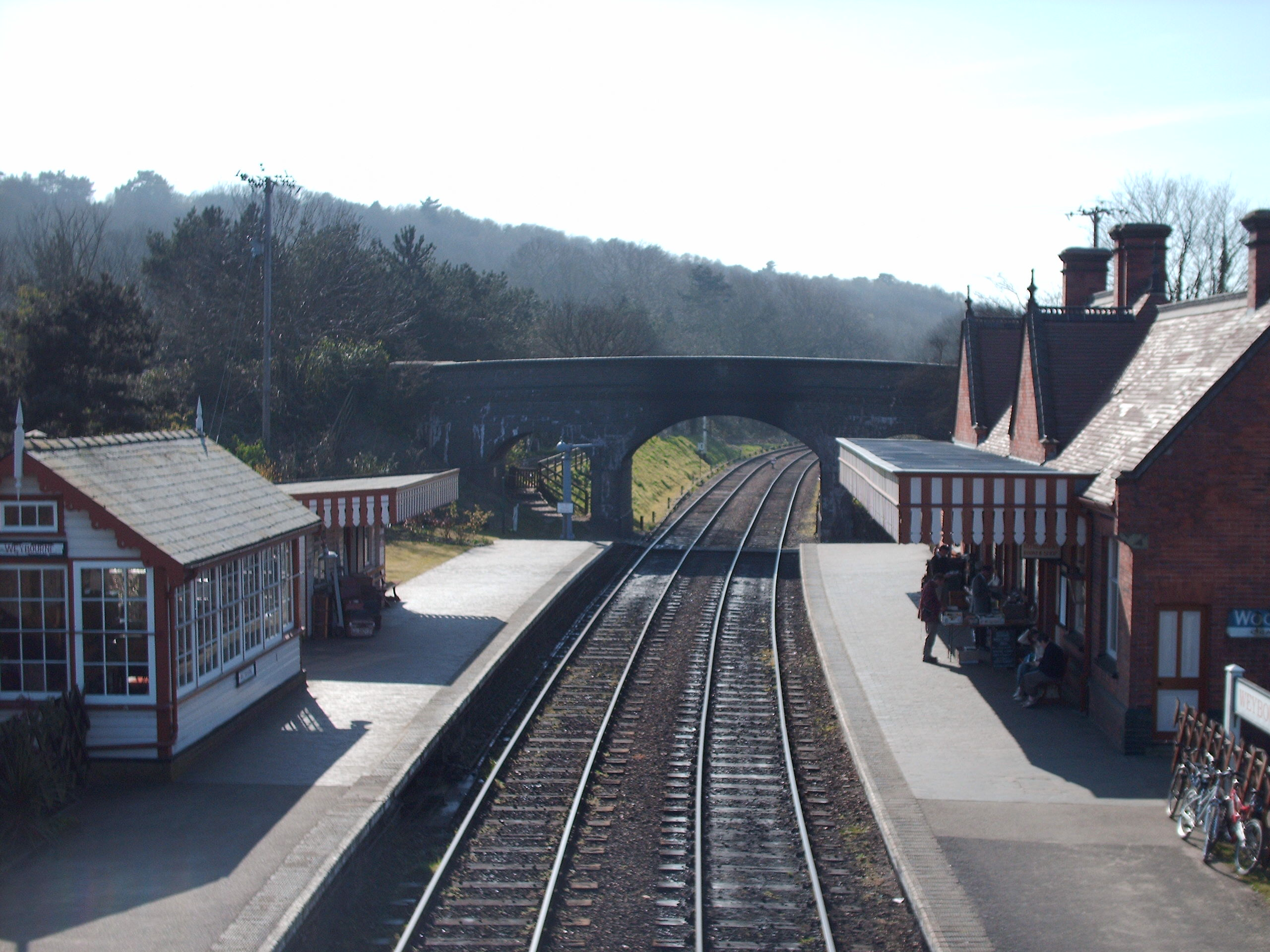
Looking westbound along the line towards Holt

Weybourne railway station lies about 1,000 yards (914 m) from the village centre; it is signposted from the coast road opposite the church. It was built in 1900; other structures of the appropriate era, such as the signal box, waiting room and footbridge have been imported from other locations. Upon closure of the line between Melton Constable and Sheringham in 1964, British Railways lifted the track and razed the station, apart from the main building. In May 1973, it was used as the location for the filming of the Dad's Army episode, "The Royal Train".

=== Buses ===
The village lies on the CH1 bus route, which connects Wells-next-the-Sea, Sheringham and Cromer, along the A149 coast road. Regular services are operated by Sanders Coaches.

=== Muckleburgh Collection ===
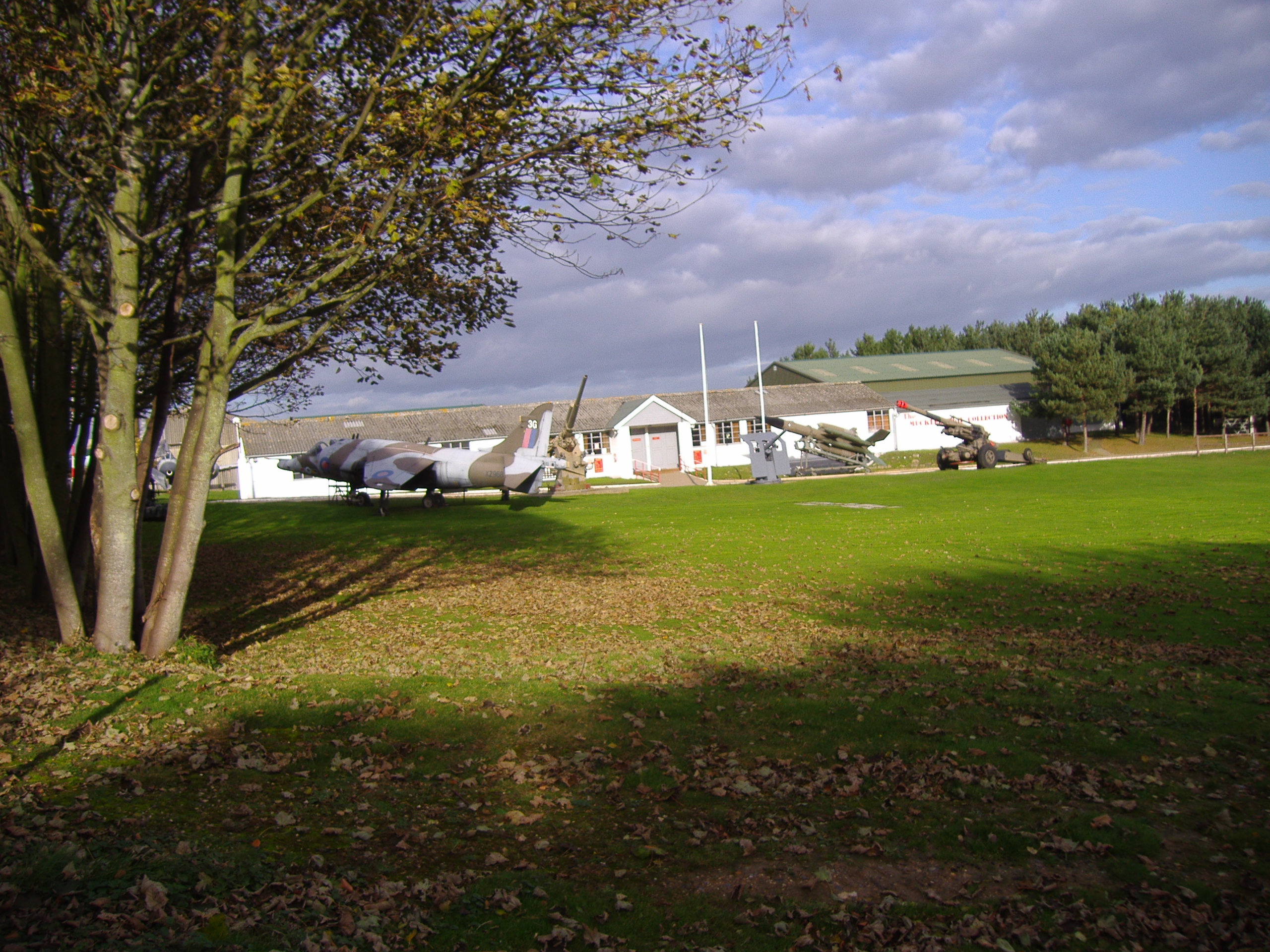
The Muckleburgh collection at Weybourne Camp

A popular attraction is the Muckleburgh Collection; it is the largest privately owned collection of tanks, armoured cars and other military vehicles used in wars across the globe.

== Notable residents ==
- Benjamin Pulleyne, vicar of Weybourne, 1845–1861, was also headmaster of Gresham's School
- Sir John Major, KG, CH, prime minister from 1990 to 1997, owns a house in the village.

== See also ==
- RAF Weybourne
- Spring Beck.
