= Weybourne Windmill =

Windmill in Weybourne, Norfolk, England

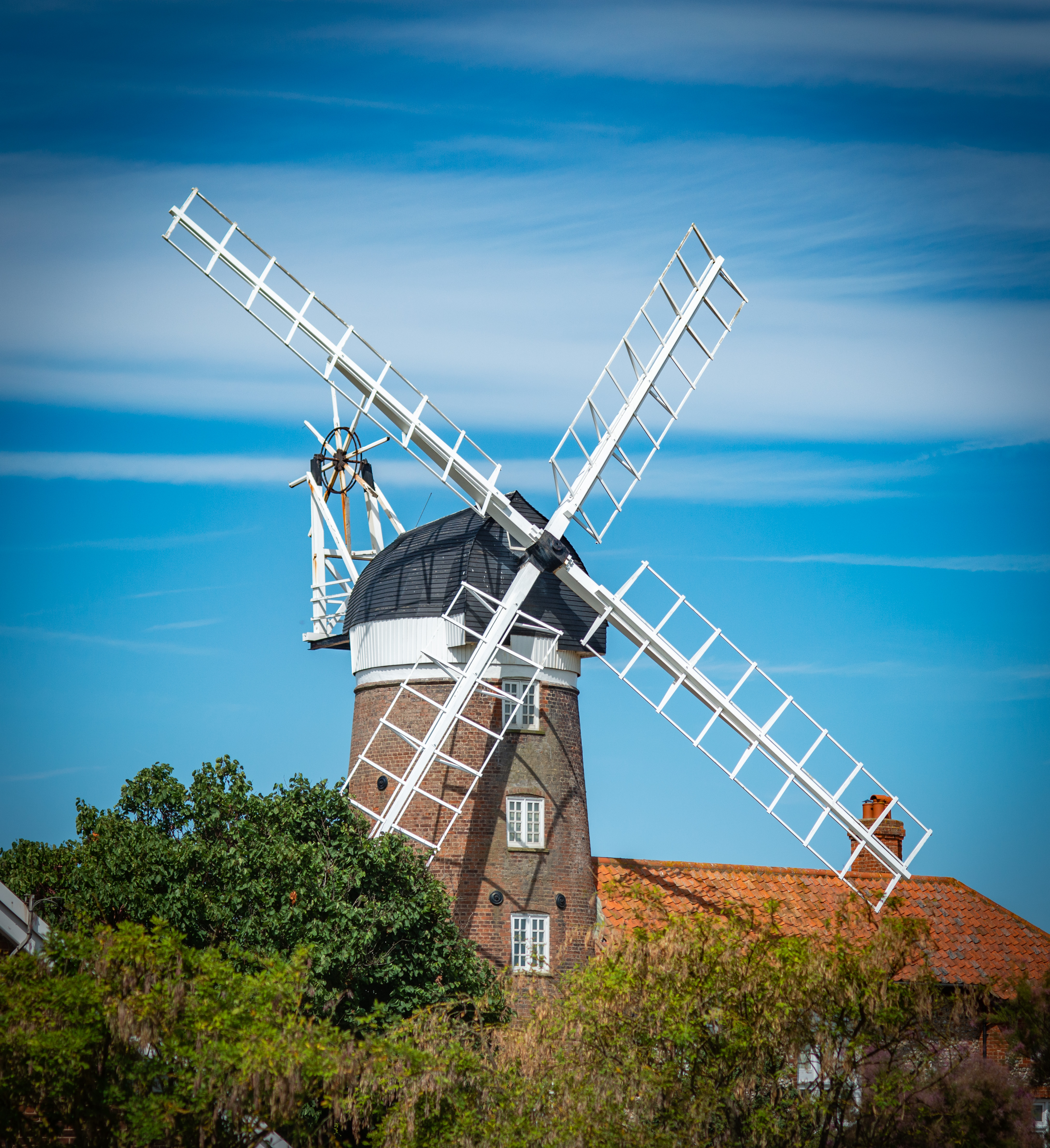
- Interactive map of Weybourne Windmill

Origin
- Mill location: Village of Weybourne
- Grid reference: TF76033267
- Coordinates: 52°56′37.3″N 1°08′50.0″E

Information
- Purpose: 1850

Weybourne Windmill is located on the eastern high ground above the village of Weybourne in the English county of Norfolk. It is on the northern side of the A149 coastal road that links King's Lynn to Great Yarmouth. The Windmill is 3 miles west of Sheringham and is within the Norfolk Coast AONB. The mill is a grade II listed building.

== Description ==
The Windmill was built in 1850 and consists of five storeys built from red brick. When it was in operation the sails, which are now fixed in an easterly direction, powered three pairs of overdriven millstones. The millstones were located on the second floor. The mill had four double shuttered sails. The cap is boat shaped and has an eight-bladed fan. It once also had a stage around its girth at the second floor which has long been removed.

== History ==
The windmill ceased production in 1916 and fell into disrepair. In 1925 some restoration work of sorts took place but as a result most of the machinery was removed except for the windshaft. By 1929 the windmill had passed into the hands of Sydney Broklesby and the mill had no sails, fantail or gallery.

=== 1967 onwards ===
In 1967 the windmill was purchased by A Mr Body and in 1968 a new cap made and installed by William Bird & Son, Contractors Ltd. of North Walsham. In 1969 the skeleton sails seen to this day were installed by Thompson & Son. There was no brakewheel and so sails were fixed accordingly to face to the East. In 1970, a grant was given by the Norfolk Windmills Trust to restore the paintwork of the windmill and in 1973 a further grant was given by the Trust for further renovation and maintenance work. In 1982 the windmill was once again up for sale and was sold for £125,000.
