= A149 road =

Road in Norfolk, linking Kings Lynn and Great Yarmouth

A149

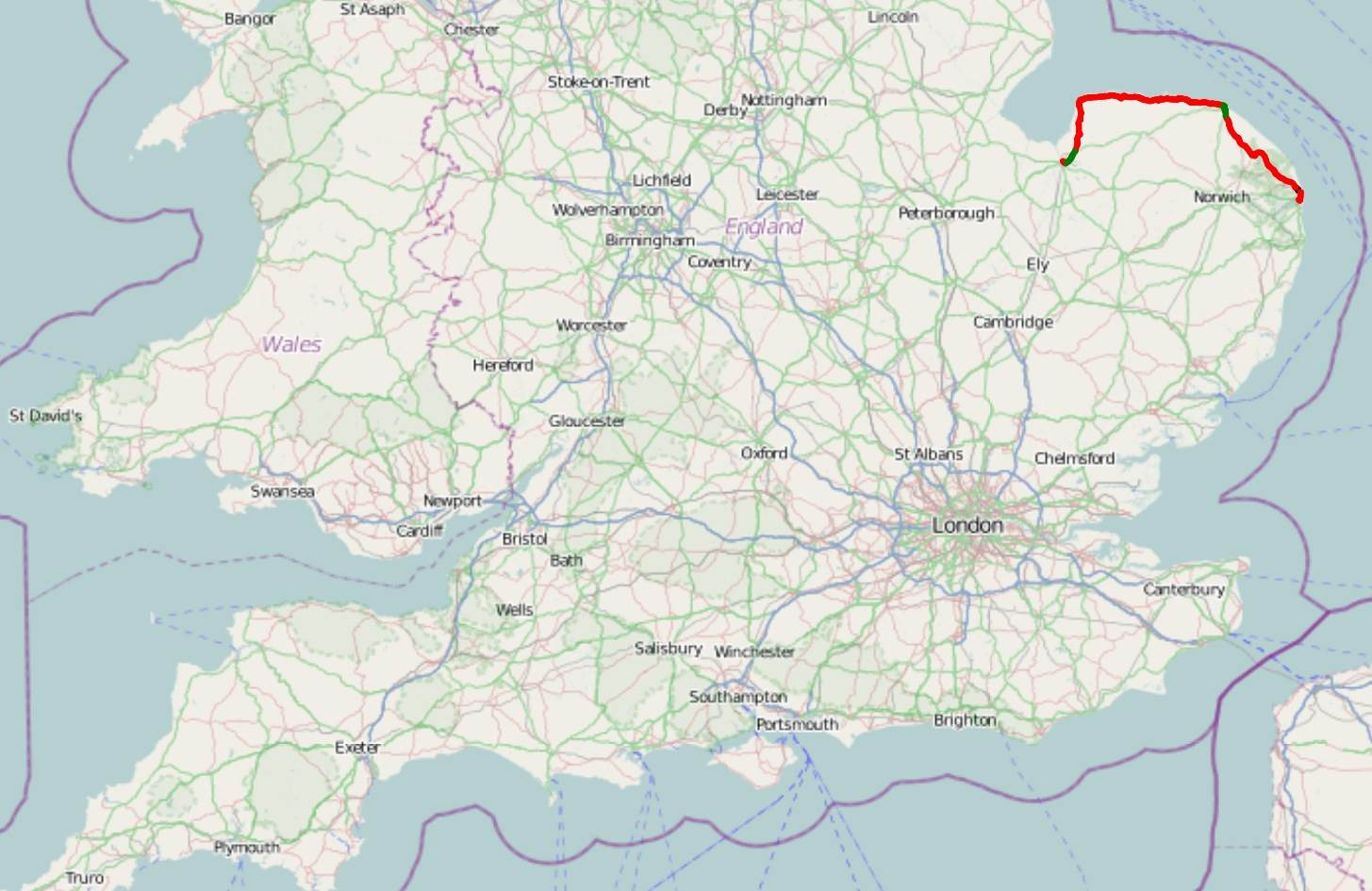
- Click map to enlarge

Route information
- Length: 85.2 mi (137.1 km)

Major junctions
- West end: King's Lynn
- A10; A47 A148 A140 A1151 A1062 A1064
- East end: Great Yarmouth

Location
- Country: United Kingdom
- Primary destinations: King's Lynn, Hunstanton, Wells next the Sea, Sheringham, Cromer, North Walsham, Caister-on-Sea and Great Yarmouth

Road network
- Roads in the United Kingdom; Motorways; A and B road zones

The A149 is commonly known as "The Coast Road" to local residents and tourists, as this road runs along the North Norfolk coast from King's Lynn to Great Yarmouth, via coastal villages.

== Route ==
=== King's Lynn to Hunstanton ===
The road begins in King's Lynn on a roundabout with the A148 London Road and Nar Ouse Way and begins southbound out of King's Lynn. It runs over a railway bridge then past a Tesco Supermarket. It then reaches a major junction with the A47 and the A10 at a roundabout. It becomes a primary route heading north on Queen Elizabeth Way. This serves as an eastern bypass for King's Lynn. The road reaches a roundabout with the A1076 and the B1145 towards Gayton. The road continues as a primary route until Grimston Road Roundabout where the road becomes a secondary route. If you were to travel west along the A148, you would reach the centre of King's Lynn. Travelling east along the A148 would get you to Fakenham and Holt before reaching Cromer. When going from Kings Lynn to Cromer, it is advisable to use the A148 to provide a faster straighter route.

Continuing north along the A149 will take you towards the North Norfolk Coast and is usually signposted for Heacham or Hunstanton. The road passes the historic Castle Rising castle and past Sandringham House and estate, shortly followed by Dersingham. Snettisham is about 3 miles along the road. Snettisham has an RSPB Wildlife Reserve that throughout the year is a habitat for birds, often migrating from the north over the North Sea. The RSPB have compiled a list of "star species", that include the avocet.

The road continues onto Heacham and has a roadside petrol station, owned by BP. There is also a newly built lidl here and they are situated almost next to each other. The road passes a junction with a road to Bircham, and a road into the centre of the town, with links to the beach. This road, as it has done since pre-Georgian era, has been a connection for Heacham, Snettisham, Sandringham. The A149 in Heacham is now a bypass. There have been some record of this road being a Roman Road.

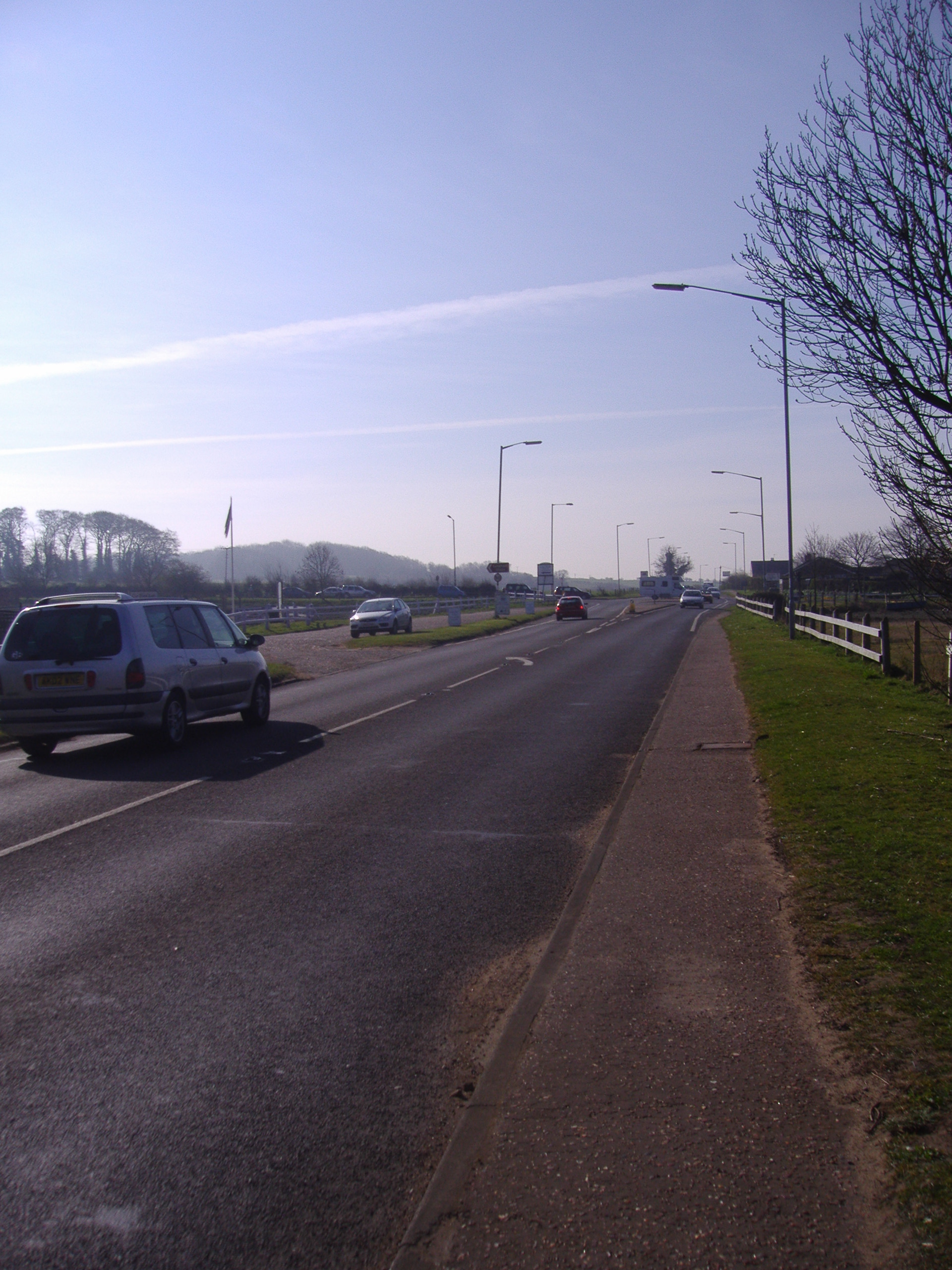
The road at Heacham looking back towards the so-called Lavendar Junction

The road continues to Hunstanton past Norfolk Lavender. Hunstanton is a seaside resort with a beach which is popular for Fossil hunting in and around the cliffs. Also, the town is quite large with many local shops, including Britain's Largest Joke Shop and a Tesco Supermarket.

=== Hunstanton to Brancaster ===
After Hunstanton is Old Hunstanton. The road continues around the coast, following the same sand covered beach as the one in Heacham. From Hunstanton to Brancaster is 13 miles long. The road narrows slightly, it is still a single carriageway road. The road this time does not bypass the villages, but goes through them, providing access to the village. The villages here often contain independent restaurants, shops and grocery stores. Pubs are a common feature here too. The village following Old Hunstanton is Holme-Next-The-Sea, a coastal village situated on marshes and Creakes where boats are often sailed. Beyond the marsh is a large sand dune, known as "Holme Dunes". Part of this is protected by the NWT (Norfolk Wildlife Trust) as a protection for species that nest here. Being situated next to the North Sea, many birds come and migrate for the summer or winter here. At Holme Dunes, there have been sightings of the wryneck and even the extremely rare Ruppell's warbler. Also protected are natterjack toads, edible crabs and waders. Holme is also the end of Peddars Way and is the junction with the Norfolk Coast Path. Following this ancient Roman Road southbound will bring you to Thetford passing through the Brecklands. Peddars Way may have run to Branodunum, a Roman fort along this road. Following Holme's Main Road is the village of Thornham. The name of the road here is High Street, as it is the main road through the village. Separating Holme and Thornham are the marshes. There is a small staithe here, as there is throughout the north-west Norfolk area. Thornham village has access to the staithe via Staithe Road, which connects to the A149. Crabs nest in the muddy banks in the creeks, and when there is High Tide, the marsh often floods and the banks of these rivers overflow. The village and road is protected by farmland either side. The village of Thornham is approximately 1 mile long and hosts an independent delicatessen and cafe along with a pick your own fruit farm cum orchard. About 2 miles on is Titchwell. There is an RSPB reserve here that has been featured in the BBCs Springwatch. The Norfolk Coastal path runs through this village further towards the beach, and has been transformed into an embankment as coastal defence. This continues through North Norfolk to beyond Cromer. This acts as protection to the rising tides, and flooding. On the beach, prehistoric forests can be seen at low tide, and archaeological digs have found mesolithic flint submerged. In Titchwell Marsh and on the beach, medieval pottery has also been found. Sightings at Titchwell Marsh have been marsh harriers and bitterns Like in Snettisham, a list of "star species" has been compiled.

Not far along the A149 is the village of Brancaster, a Roman town with the name Branodunum, meaning "Fortress of Bran". This was a place of Roman importance, and may have been where footpath, Peddars Way led. Now, the village marshes are owned by the National Trust and are kept as conservation areas. There is a long beach, and access to Titchwell beach is restricted due to a large creek. The sand beach is one that again, spans the length of the coast. Tides are strong and there is a memorial to the death of Jake Parker, 5, who drowned near the village. Brancaster currently hosts a pub, church and hotel.

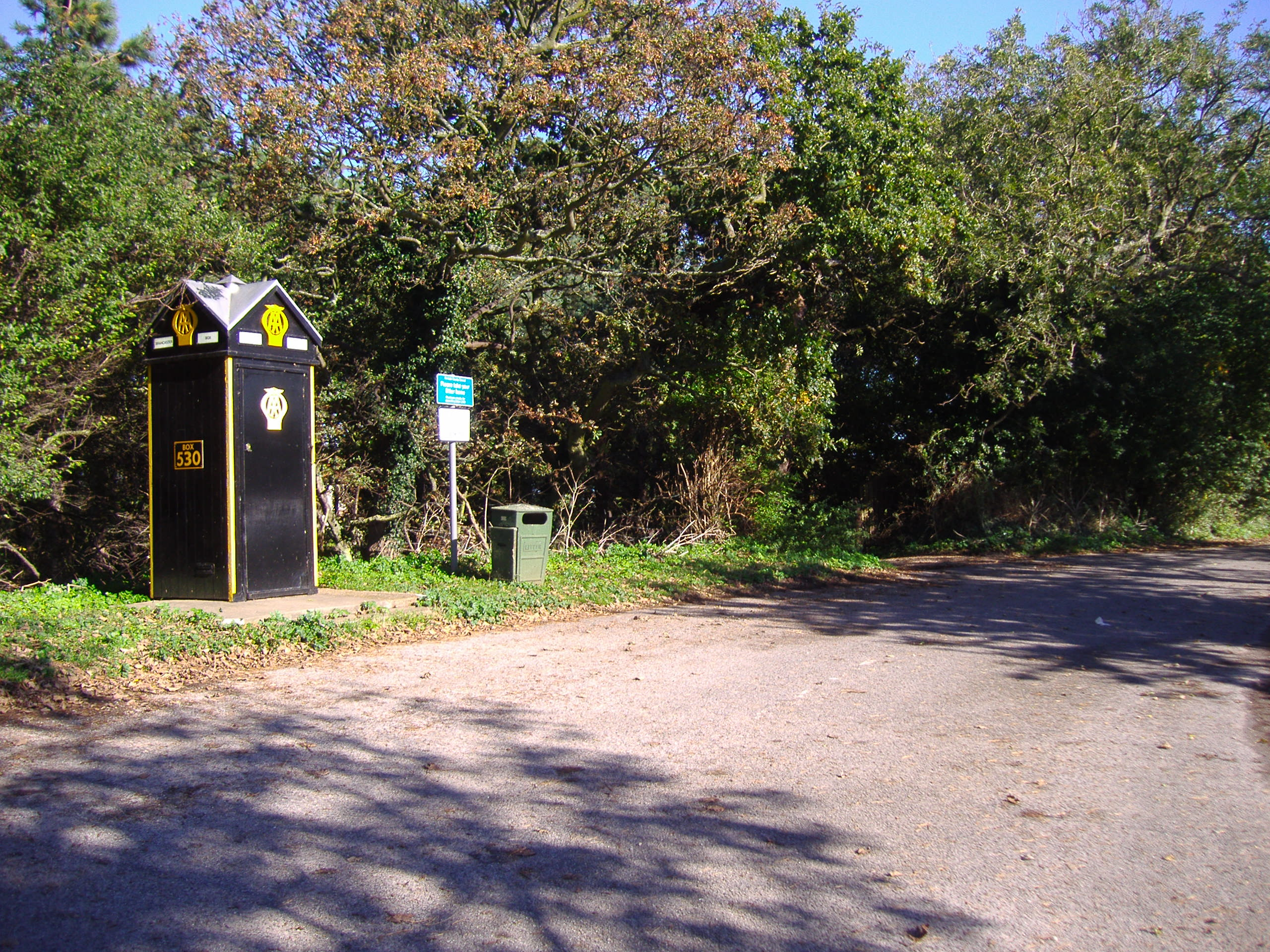
The Listed AA Box at Brancaster

=== Brancaster to Wells (The Burnhams and Holkham) ===
The road continues following the coast. The road widens slightly between Brancaster and Deepdale. The road runs around a mile inland from the Norfolk Coast Path at this point. The marshes continue, as do the little Staithes. The next village after Brancaster, is Brancaster Staithe. This is a larger staithe, and runs to the west of Scolt Head Island. Sailing is often enjoyed here. In Brancaster Staithe, there are small shops and stalls connected to houses. There is also a small church. Access to the beach beyond the staithe can be restricted due to there being no road direct to the beach, though access can be made by walking along Brancaster Beach. Burnham Deepdale follows Brancaster Staithe if travelling eastbound. Deepdale is the next Petrol Station after Heacham for 12 miles. The Murco petrol station has shops next to it. These include the "Deepdale Cafe", Fat Face and a Tourist Information Centre. North of this road are the Salt Marshes and Mow Creek, the creek that connects Brancaster Staithe to this village. Sailing is also available here. At the west end of Deepdale is a minor road leading to the B1155 in Burnham Market, a town made up of 3 of the older Burnhams: Ulph, Sutton and Westgate. The road narrows and heads southbound for about a mile as the road bypasses Burnham Norton. The B1355 southbound brings you to Fakenham via Burnham Market and provides lorry access to Cromer as the road beyond here is inaccessible to lorries. Following the Salt Marshes and Saithes, the road heads north again and bears east as it enters Burnham Overy Staithe, passing the River Burn, of which the Burnhams are named. The road narrows and has a width restriction of 2 meters. The road then comes out passing a green and village; Burnham Overy Staithe. This village is a popular sailing village with a boathouse shop and pub. It is said that Lord Nelson learned to sail here, hence the name of the pub, "The Hero", situated on the A149 itself. There is a walk to the beach along the Norfolk Coast Path, that is about a mile long. Also, a ferry is available to Scolt Head Island.

Continuing on the A149, the road runs south of salt marshes, but no Staithe. The land to the north is owned by Viscount Coke as part of the Holkham Estate, situated on the next village. If HGV access is required to King's Lynn, the B1155 to Burnham Market will take you there. The road passes more Salt Marshes to the north, and pine forests to the south. A wall separates the estate from the road. Holkham estate was purchased by Sir Edward Coke in 1909, and Holkham Hall was completed in 1764. The A149 has a further crossroads, allowing access to the house southbound, and access to the beach northbound. The beach is owned by Holkham Estates Limited. Holkham has museums, shops, cafes and a pub as a result of the manor. The village is small. Following the road around, you arrive in Wells-Next-The-Sea, a town in North Norfolk. The road is built on a small raised bed to prevent flooding as it runs through marshes. This marsh is flat and runs from the dunes in Holkham to the woodland on the estate the other side of Wells. The A149 does not enter Wells, but the B1105 does. It is often signposted as the A149 in the centre of the town. Wells has many shops and is popular for fish and chips. Wells has a harbour and gillying is an activity undertaken commonly. The A149 bypasses Wells on its south side. There is a T junction, eastbound continues on the A149, signposted "Stiffkey" and the right of way is southbound becomes the B1105 and northbound becomes the A149.

=== Wells next the Sea to Cromer ===
Just out of Wells, the road passes on the right, the Wells and Walsingham Light Railway. From here the road runs south of Stiffkey salt marshes. This stretch of the road runs parallel with the "Peddars Way" section of the North Norfolk Coastal Path, which is about 1/4 mile (0.40 km) north and runs along the fringe of the marshes. In Stiffkey, the road narrows to a single lane causing approaching traffic to give way. Beyond the village the road crosses the River Stiffkey. The next village on the road is Morston (38 miles (61 km) from the start), The road skirts around the south of the village.

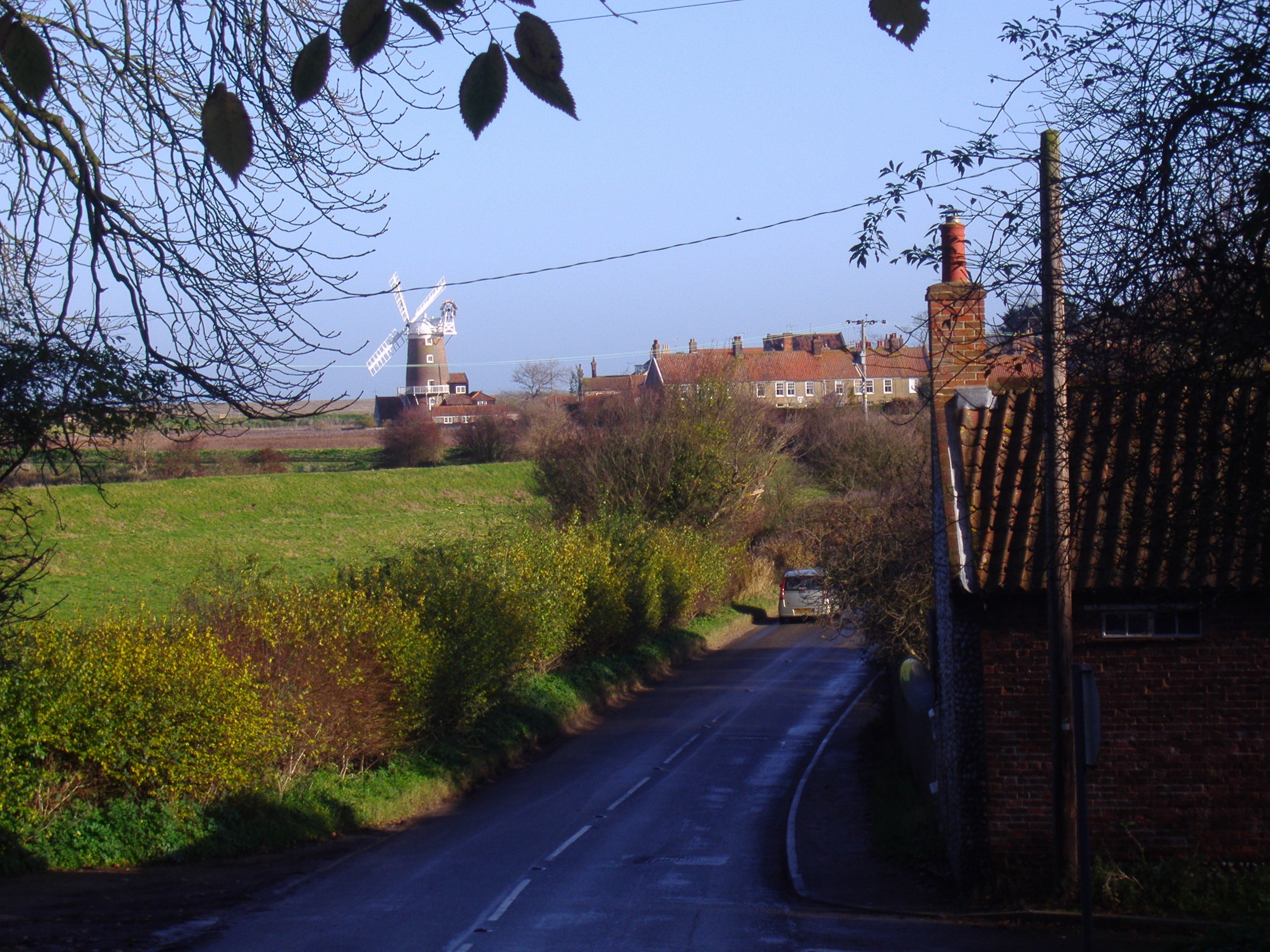
Cley Windmill from the A149

After Blakeney, the road descends into the Glaven Valley, and into view comes the landmark of Cley next the Sea Windmill. Again the road becomes a bottle neck in the summer months as it pass through the village of Cley next the Sea. The next stretch of the road between Cley and Sheringham is a very scenic part of the A149. After negotiating the narrow streets of Cley the road runs along the coast south of Cley and Salthouse salt marshes, the sea is hidden by a long bank of shingle that runs along the shoreline here. The marshes are a Nature Reserve and all along this stretch of the road there are lay-bys and car parks which are used as viewing points.

The road now rises away from the marshes and twists and turns into the next village of Kelling. The road now passes through the gentle and heaths of Kelling Heath and Weybourne. Just before entering the village of Weybourne, the road passes Weybourne Camp on the left. The road now passes through the village of Weybourne (45.5 miles (73.2 km)) and up a hill past the village Windmill.

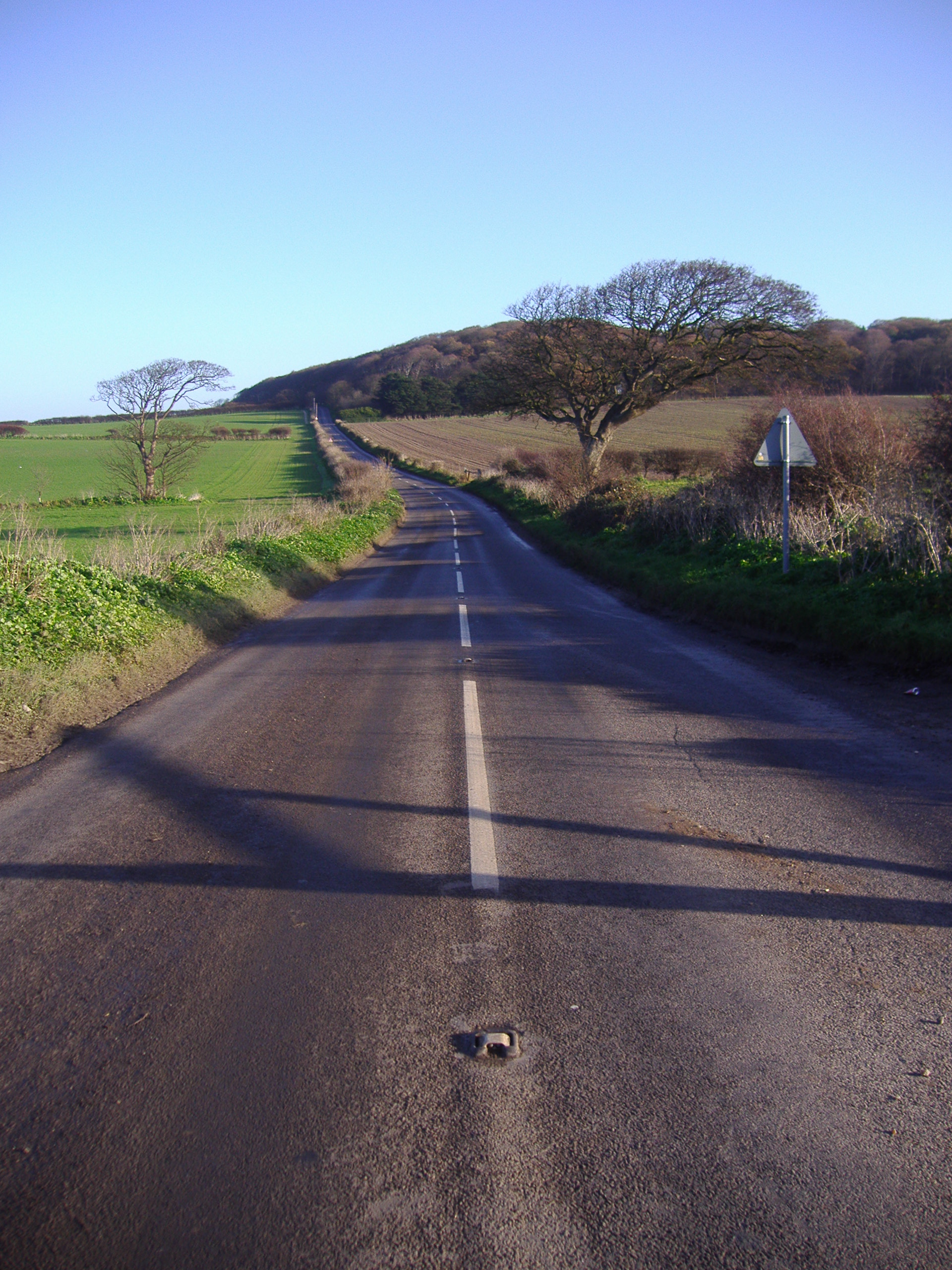
The road near Sheringham Park and the National Trust

As the road stretches off to Sheringham it passes under a railway bridge carrying the North Norfolk Railway. The road now passes through a stretch of land that is owned by The National Trust. As then runs right alongside the A149, squeezed between the road and the Sheringham Golf Club which is set on the cliffs in an Area of Outstanding Natural Beauty. The mini roundabout at Sheringham it is 48.2 miles (77.6 km) from the start of the A149 at King's Lynn.

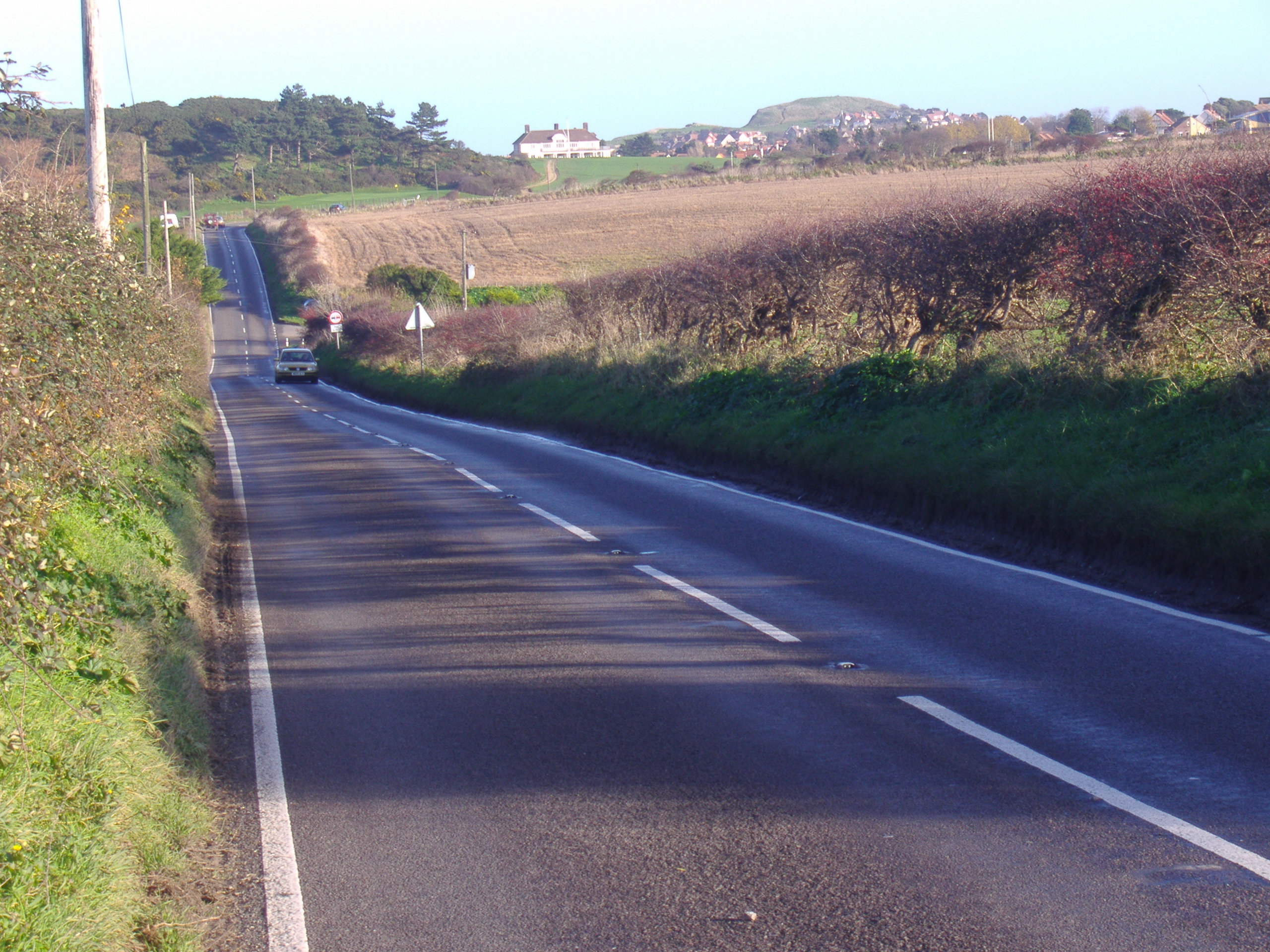
The A149 east into Sheringham

Sheringham is a seaside resort. The route now passes the terminus for the North Norfolk Railway on the left. The A149 runs south of the heart of the town, passing the prominent hill on the left known locally as "Beeston Bump". The road now also has a railway line running parallel on the seaward side. At 49 miles (79 km) the road reaches the village of Beeston Regis followed by West Runton. The last village before Cromer is East Runton were the landscape of the coast is peppered with static caravans or mobile homes. The A149 now reaches the fading Victorian splendour of Cromer (52.3 miles (84.2 km)). The road drops down into the town, with a splendid view of the town's pier, where it dog-legs through the town's one way system. This part of the road becomes congested in the summer months and long queues form in the one-way system. Cromer marks the end of the roads route along the coast, as it turns south-east to cut across Norfolk towards its end at Great Yarmouth.

=== Cromer to Stalham ===
The road climbs a hill southwards, out of Cromer, past Cromer Academy towards the next village of Northrepps and past the turning on the right of the A140 which is the main road to Norwich. Passing through well ordered arable farmland the road then reaches a cross roads, with the B1436 just before the village of Thorpe Market. The B1436 links the Cromer-Holt road to Mundesley on the coast. Out of the village the road runs along the boundary of Gunton Park, with some 800 acres (3.2 km^{2}) of deer park, on the right. Further on is the village of Antingham before reaching North Walsham, (61 miles (98 km) from King's Lynn). At North Walsham there is a junction controlled with traffic lights. Here the road turn right and takes a new route around the western side of the Town, past the Bacton Gas terminal's link to the rail network. The old route would have taken you through the busy town centre. This new route runs part of the way along what was the disused track bed of the Midland and Great Northern Joint Railway (M&GN) railway between Stalham and North Walsham. Heading towards the Norfolk Broads (part of the Norfolk and Suffolk Broads Authority, the road passes the villages of Worstead and Dilham and then passes through Smallburgh were the road clips The Broads. Just past Smallburgh the road turns left at a T junction. The road to the right is the A1151, from Wroxham and Norwich, which terminates at this junction. The road now takes a large north easterly arch around Barton Broad, crossing the River Ant at Wayford Bridge. The road now curves back towards Stalham passing several boat hire yards. Stalham is 69 miles (111 km) from the start of the A149, and from here the road cuts across the flatlands of Norfolk skirting the Broads as it goes.

=== Stalham, across the broads to Great Yarmouth ===
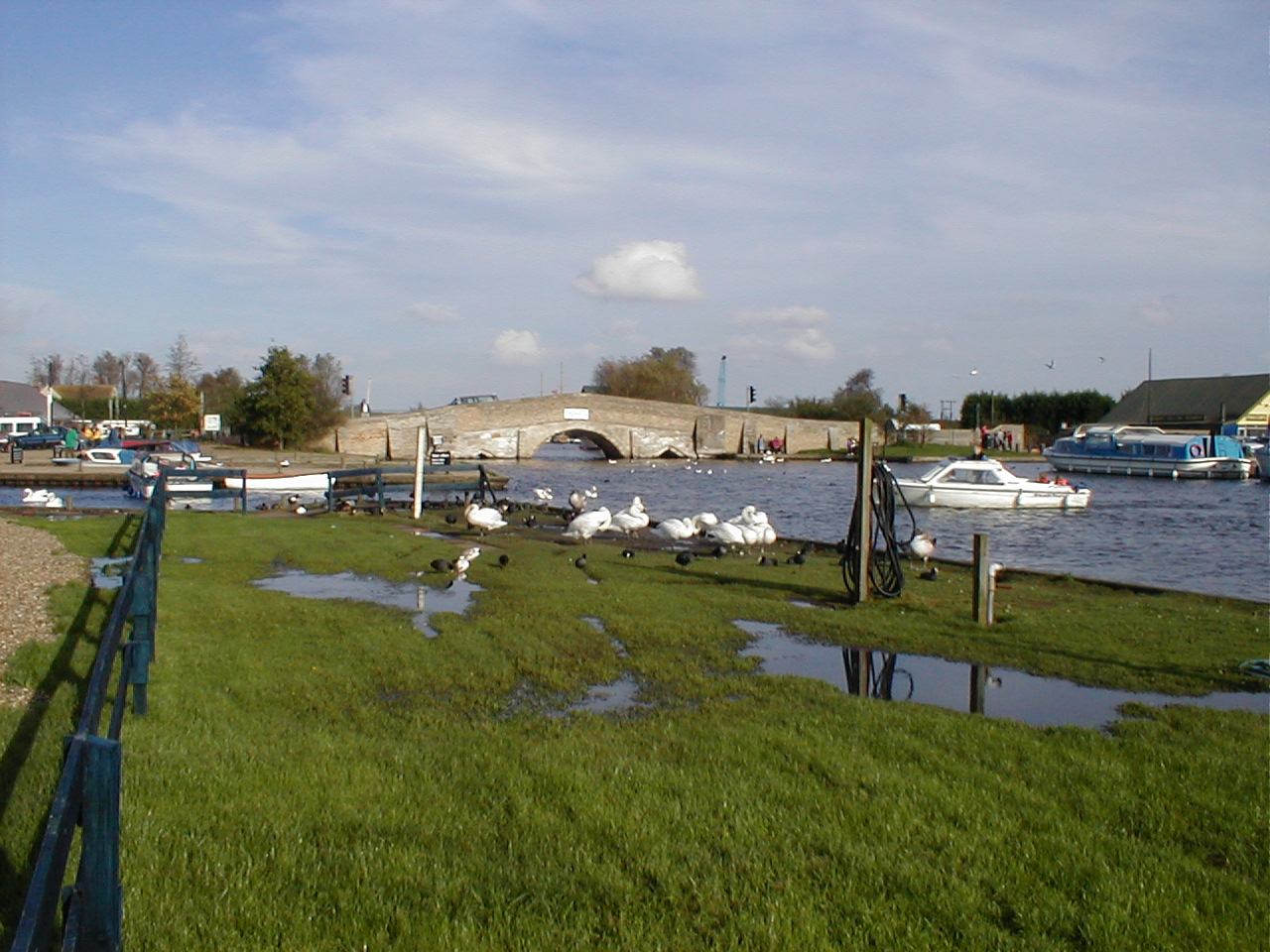
Potter Heigham Bridge next to the modern bridge of the A149

Long straights characterise this 5-mile (8.0 km) stretch from Stalham to Potter Heigham. The straights pass through the villages of Sutton and Catfield. This part of the A149 has a bad reputation for fatalities and care should be taken at all the junctions that dissect this 5-mile (8.0 km) stretch. Most of this section is not the original route of the road. The original road runs parallel on the right, the new route effectively by-passing out the villages, and at Potter Heigham Bridge (74 miles (119 km)) the two roads converge. After Potter Heigham the next village is Repps with Bastwick followed by Rollesby (77 miles (124 km)). At Rollesby the road crosses Ormesby Broad were there is parking if you wish to visit this Broad. Past the large water works on the left and the road now passes through Ormesby St. Michael and then Ormesby St. Margaret. Before coming to another roundabout junction. This is the terminus of the A1064 which has come across the Broads from Acle a distance of 7.2 miles (11.6 km) in all. Looking straight across the roundabout is the site of Caister Castle. The A149 is now a Dual Carriageway and, at another junction, bypasses Caister-on-Sea. After the bypass, the road narrows back to a Single Carriageway as it enters Great Yarmouth. The road now heads south, past Yarmouth Stadium greyhound racing track and stadium, and the Heliport at North Denes Airfield, on the right. At the next set of traffic lights is Jellicoe Road, leading to Great Yarmouth Horse Racecourse. The road follows the east bank of the River Bure. At the large roundabout the A149 comes to an end, and joins the A47 road at the northern side of the Breydon Bridge, close to Great Yarmouth railway station. The total distance from Hardwick flyover to this roundabout in Great Yarmouth is 85.237 miles (137.176 km) (Goggle Pedometer).

== Tourist destinations en route ==
- King's Lynn
- Castle Rising
- Sandringham House
- Snettisham Farm Park
- RSPB reserve Snettisham
- Norfolk Lavender Heacham
- Hunstanton (Leisure Park and Beach – Sea Life Centre, Swimming Pool and Amusements'
- RSPB reserve Titchwell
- Brancaster (Beach and Education Centre by National Trust) – Branodunum Site of Roman Fort
- Burnham Deepdale Camping and Staithe
- Burnham Overy Staithe Beach and Scolt Head Island Nature Reserve
- Holkham Hall and Beach
- Wells-next-the-Sea Holiday Park and Town
- Stiffkey Marshes
- Morston and Blakeney Seal Trips and Staithe
- Cley Windmill and Beach
- Muckleburgh Collection Tank museum Weybourne
- Weybourne Windmill
- Sheringham Town and Leisure Park – Also the North Norfolk Railway to Holt
- Hillside Animal Sanctuary West Runton
- Cromer Town, Beach and Cromer Pier, also the Bittern Line with National Rail Services to Norwich
- Norfolk Broads
- Great Yarmouth Stadium greyhound racing track and stadium
- Great Yarmouth Horse Racecourse
- Great Yarmouth Town and Amusements'
