= RAF Weybourne =

Second World War anti-aircraft establishment in Norfolk, England

RAF Weybourne
- Norwich, Norfolk in England
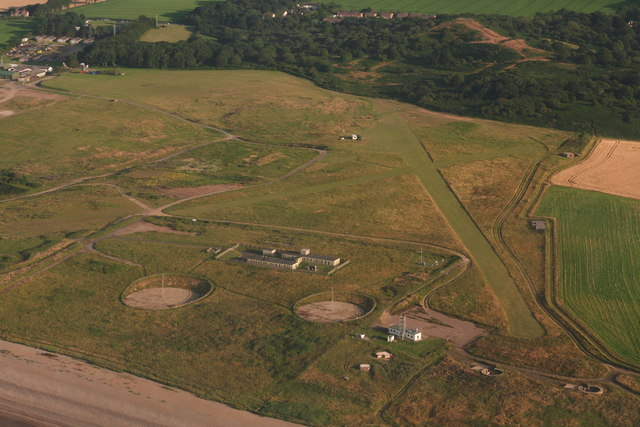
- Weybourne airfield in 2012

Site information
- Owner: Air Ministry
- Operator: Royal Air Force

Location
- Shown within Norfolk
- Coordinates: 52.9505°N 1.1215°E

Site history
- Built: 1939
- In use: 1939-1942

Airfield information
Runways
| Direction | Length and surface |
|---|---|
| 00/00 | Grass |
| 00/00 | Grass |

RAF Weybourne was a Second World War anti-aircraft establishment. 'X' Flt, No 1 Anti-Aircraft Co-operation Unit were based at the station between 16 May and 14 September 1939, with 'T' Flt, No 1 Anti-Aircraft Co-operation Unit there between 25 February and 29 April 1942. No 6 Anti-Aircraft Co-operation Unit were based there between 7 December 1942 and 30 November 1943.

Associated with the anti-aircraft gunnery, the station operated the de Havilland DH-82B Queen Bee target drone aircraft, a radio-controlled target tug version of the Tiger Moth II.

== Postwar ==
Although the published closure date known for this airfield relates to the World War II airfield, the Army maintained an Anti Aircraft training camp across from RAF Weybourne using Bofors 40 mm guns linked to AA4 mk7 gun-laying radar. When that closed in 1958 the radars were transferred to the RAF. A very small permanent detachment was maintained there using the obsolete radar into the 1980s for cross-tell training, decoy work and to extend low level coverage. In the late 1980s, after the obsolete radars were removed, trials were carried out to confirm the site's suitability for deployment of the new mobile radars that were coming into service.

A Marconi Type 91 'Martello' radar was moved from RAF Trimingham to Weybourne in September 1996, operated by 432 Signals Unit acting as a Ready Platform (along with RAF Hopton and Trimingham) for the IUKADGE Series II (United Kingdom Air Defence Ground Environment) Radar System controlled from the R3 underground control centre at RAF Neatishead.

In October 1997 the Type 91 at RAF Weybourne was dismantled; replaced when the Type 93 at RAF Trimingham became operational.

== See also ==
- List of former Royal Air Force stations
- List of Royal Air Force aircraft squadrons
