= Stogdon =

Stogdon is a surname. Notable people with the surname include:

- Edgar Stogdon (1870–1951), English academic, cleric, and athlete
- Jean Stogdon (1928–2014), British social worker and campaigner
- John Stogdon (1876–1944), English cricketer
