= Kelling =

Village in Norfolk, England

Coordinates: 52.94°N 1.11°E

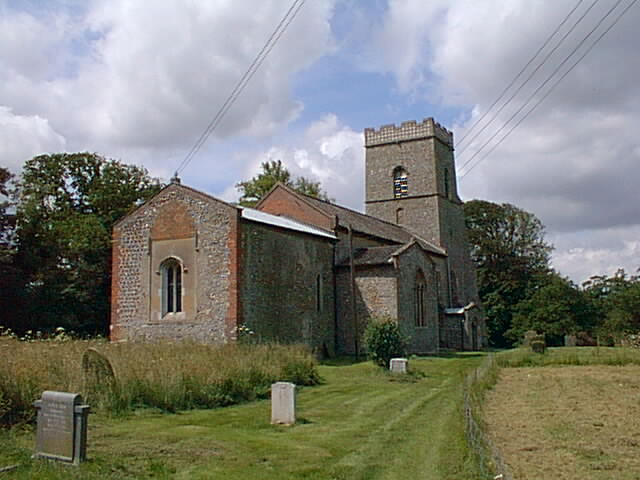
- St Mary’s Church

- Location within Norfolk
- Area: 3.09 sq mi (8.0 km^{2})
- Population: 173 (2021 census)
  - Density: 56/sq mi (22/km^{2})
- OS grid reference: TG094429
  - London: 130 miles (210 km)
- Civil parish: Kelling
- District: North Norfolk
- Shire county: Norfolk
- Region: East
- Country: England
- Sovereign state: United Kingdom
- Post town: HOLT
- Postcode district: NR25
- Dialling code: 01263
- Police: Norfolk
- Fire: Norfolk
- Ambulance: East of England
- UK Parliament: North Norfolk

Kelling (also known as Low Kelling or Lower Kelling) is a village and a civil parish in the county of Norfolk, England.

Kelling is located 10.1 miles (16.3 km) west of Cromer and 26 miles (42 km) north of Norwich, along the A149 and within the Norfolk Coast AONB.

== History ==
Kelling's name is of Anglo-Saxon origin and derives from the Old English for 'Cylla's people'.

In the Domesday Book, Kelling is listed as a settlement of 81 households in the hundred of Holt. In 1086, the village was part of the East Anglian estates of Hugh d'Avranches, Roger, son of Rainard and Ralph, son of Hagni.

Between 1903 and 1905, Home Place was built as the residence of the Reverend Percy R. Lloyd by Edward Schroeder Prior in the Arts and Crafts Style.

Kelling Hall was built in 1913 by Sir Edward Maufe in the Arts and Crafts style for Henri Deterding KBE, one of the founders of the Royal Dutch Shell.

During the Second World War, numerous static defences were built in the parish to defend against a possible German invasion.

== Geography ==
According to the 2021 census, Kelling has a population of 173 people, a decrease from the 177 people recorded in the 2011 census.

Kelling Heath is a Site of Special Scientific Interest.

The A149, between King's Lynn and Great Yarmouth, passes through the village.

== St Mary's Church ==
Kelling's Church of England parish church is dedicated to St Mary and dates from the medieval period. St Mary's is located on 'The Street' and has been Grade II listed since 1960. The church is open twice a month for Sunday service.

St Mary's holds a font dating from the Fifteenth Century and has stained-glass windows from the same period depicting various female saints. There is also a stained-glass window from the 1930s designed by Harry Mileham which depicts Saint Francis of Assisi and the royal arms from the reign of King George III which may be earlier.

== Amenities ==
The village has a reading room, which is now a book shop, gallery and tea room. There is a small Victorian school house built in 1876 and opened October 1877, still in use as a primary school today on the coastal side of the A149 just opposite the reading room.

== Governance ==
Kelling is part of the electoral ward of Coastal for local elections and is part of the district of North Norfolk.

The village's national constituency is North Norfolk, which has been represented by the Liberal Democrat Steff Aquarone since 2024.

== War Memorial ==
Kelling War Memorial is a memorial cross located at the junction of the A149 and 'The Street' which lists the following names for the First World War:

Rank	Name	Unit	Date of death	Burial/Commemoration
Sjt.	William E. Dix	9th Bn., Norfolk Regiment	25 May 1916	Lijssenthoek Military Cemetery
Sjt.	John C. Read	9th Bn., Norfolk Regt.	18 Oct. 1916	Bancourt British Cemetery
Sgt.	George F. Duffield CdG	3rd Bn., Worcestershire Regt.	14 Aug. 1918	Pernes British Cemetery
Cpl.	Robert J. Dewing	4th Bn., Norfolk Regiment	19 Apr. 1917	Jerusalem Memorial
Dvr.	William Woodhouse	367th Bty., Royal Field Artillery	28 Apr. 1915	Menin Gate
Pnr.	Benjamin Risborough	254th Coy., Royal Engineers	2 Aug. 1917	Brandhoek New Cemetery
Pte.	John W. Wright	2/4th Bn., Loyal Regiment	26 Oct. 1917	Tyne Cot
Pte.	James E. Crane DCM	2nd Bn., Norfolk Regiment	31 Oct. 1916	North Gate War Cemetery
Pte.	Arthur Moy	9th Bn., North Staffords Regt.	12 Oct. 1917	Outtersteene Cemetery

The following names were added after the Second World War:

Rank	Name	Unit	Date of death	Burial/Commemoration
Maj.	Charles C. Swainson MC	2nd Bn., Royal Norfolk Regiment	13 Jul. 1944	Kohima War Cemetery
Capt.	John R. Levitt	113 Regt., Royal Artillery	8 Dec. 1944	Forlì War Cemetery
FLt.	Harry L. Furnell	No. 24 Squadron RAF (Dakota)	17 Apr. 1945	Epsom Cemetery

== Gallery ==
The street circa 1911

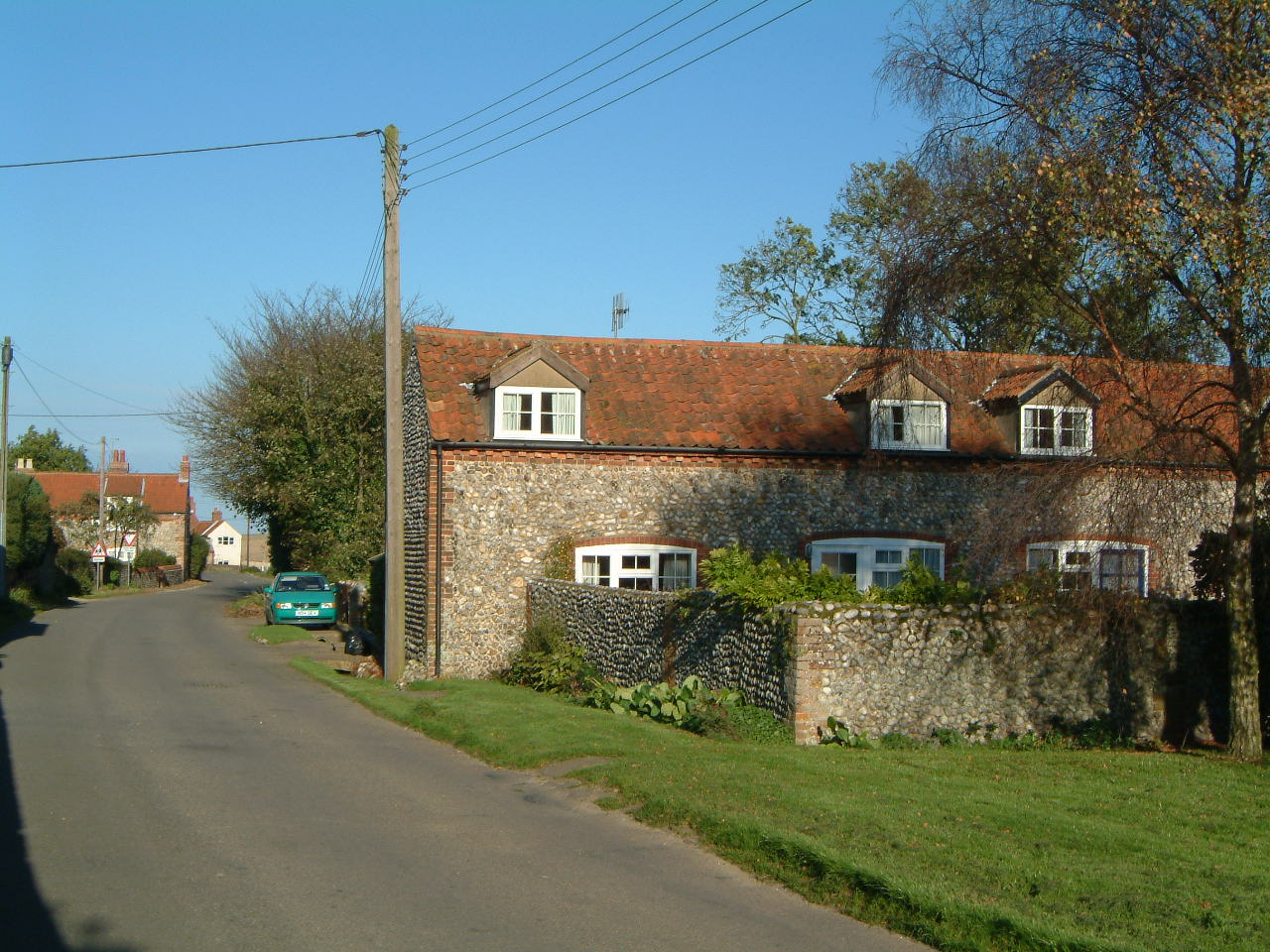
The Street

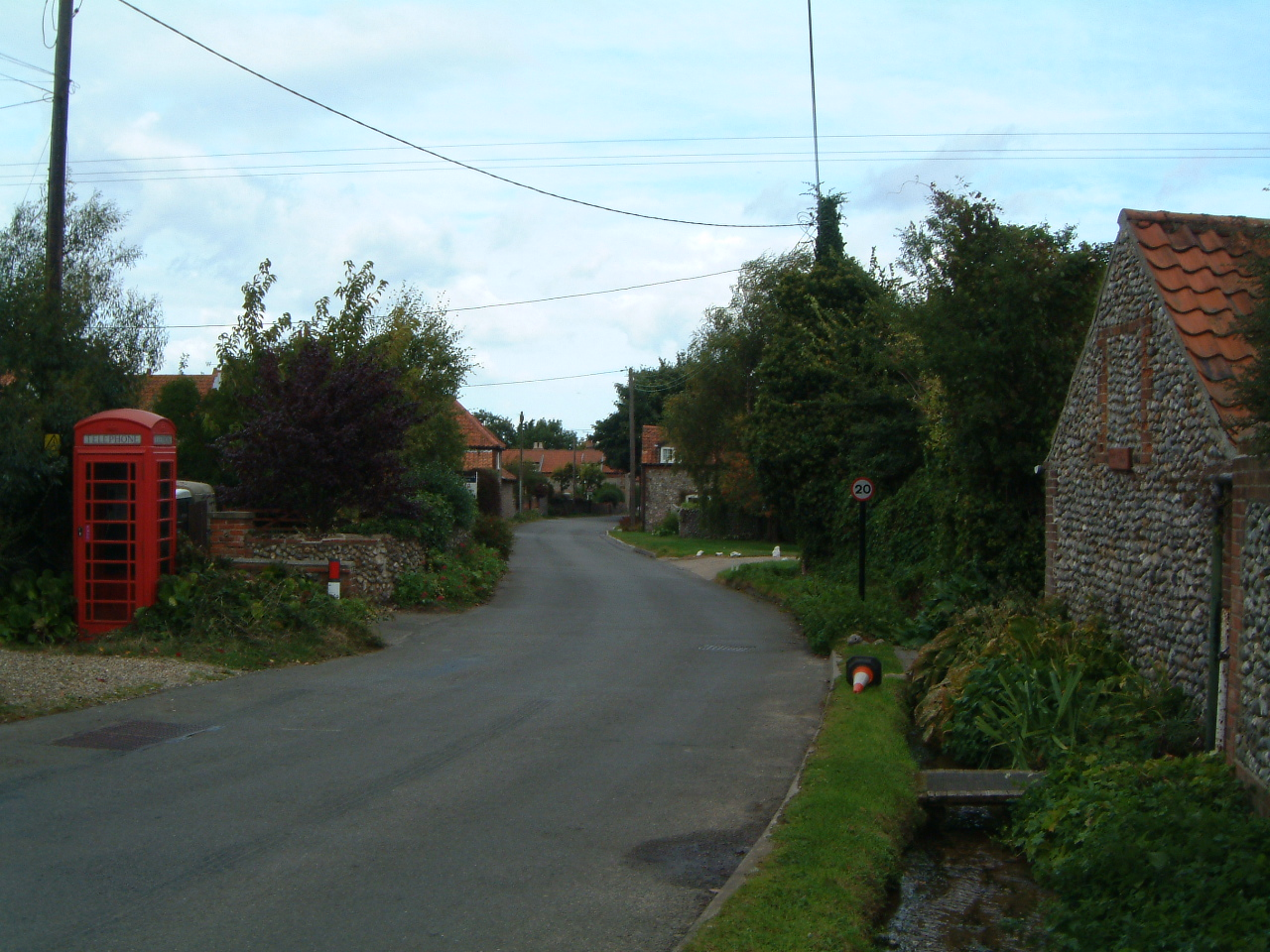
The Street

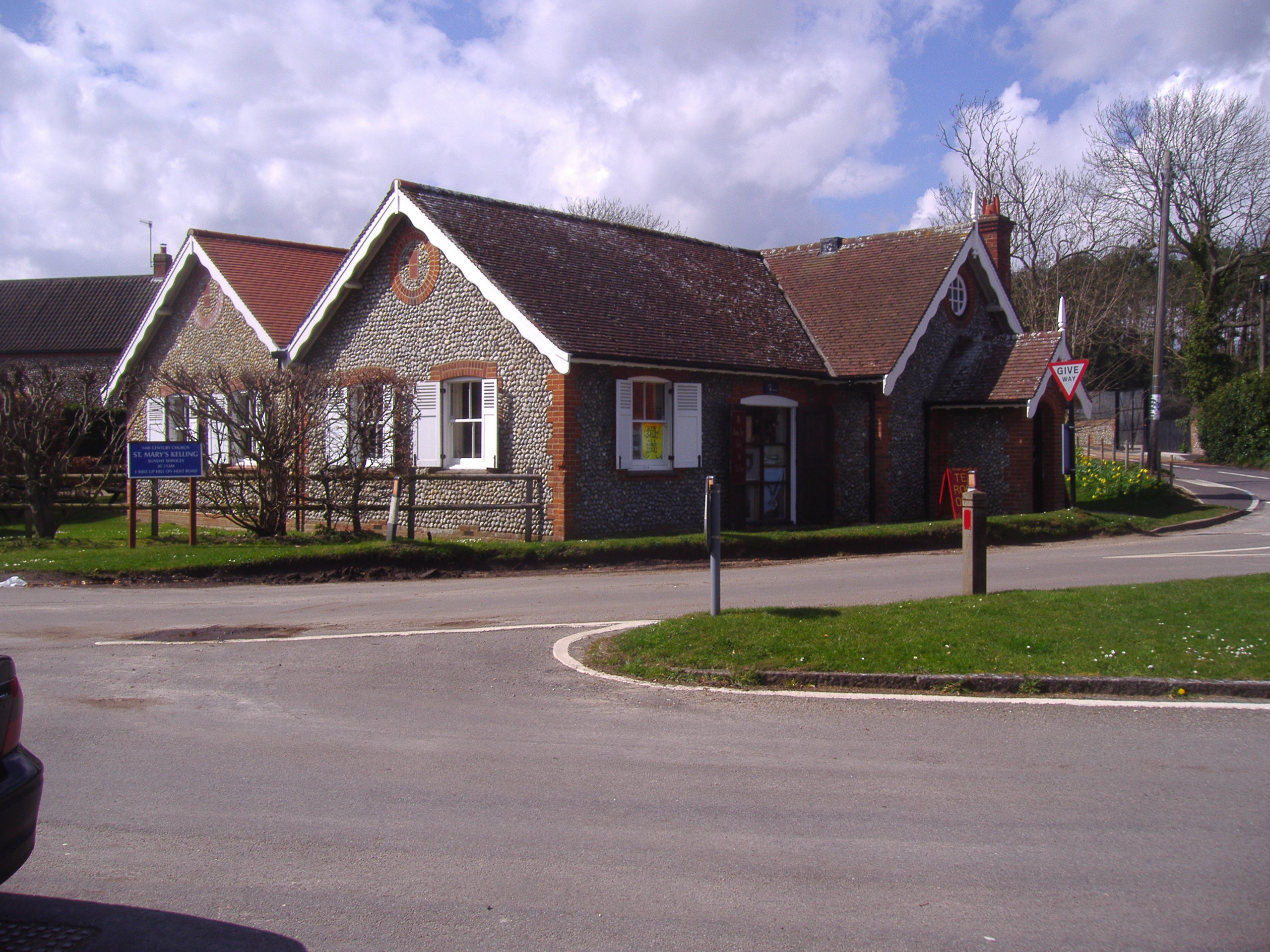
The Old Reading Room

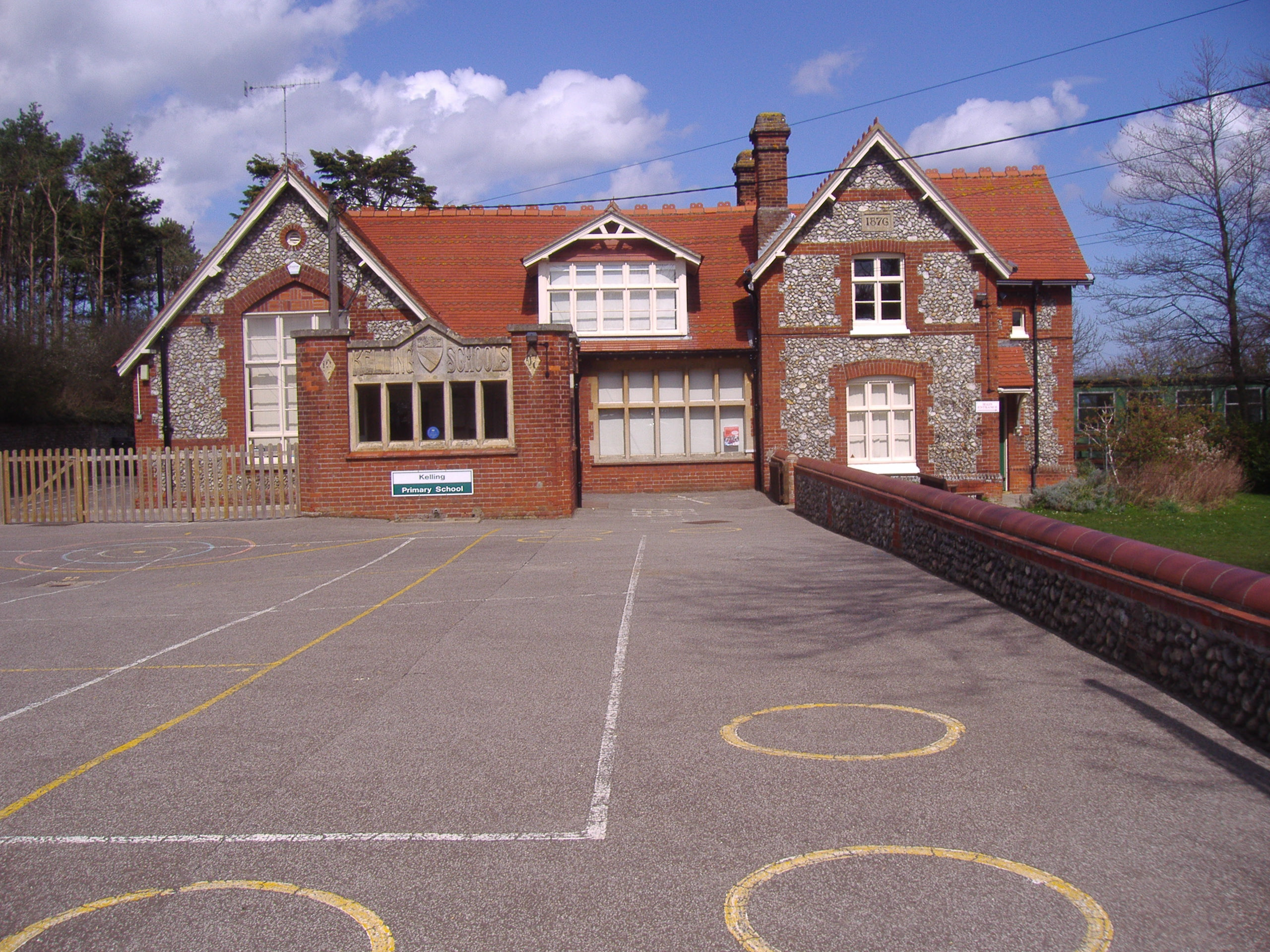
Kelling Village School

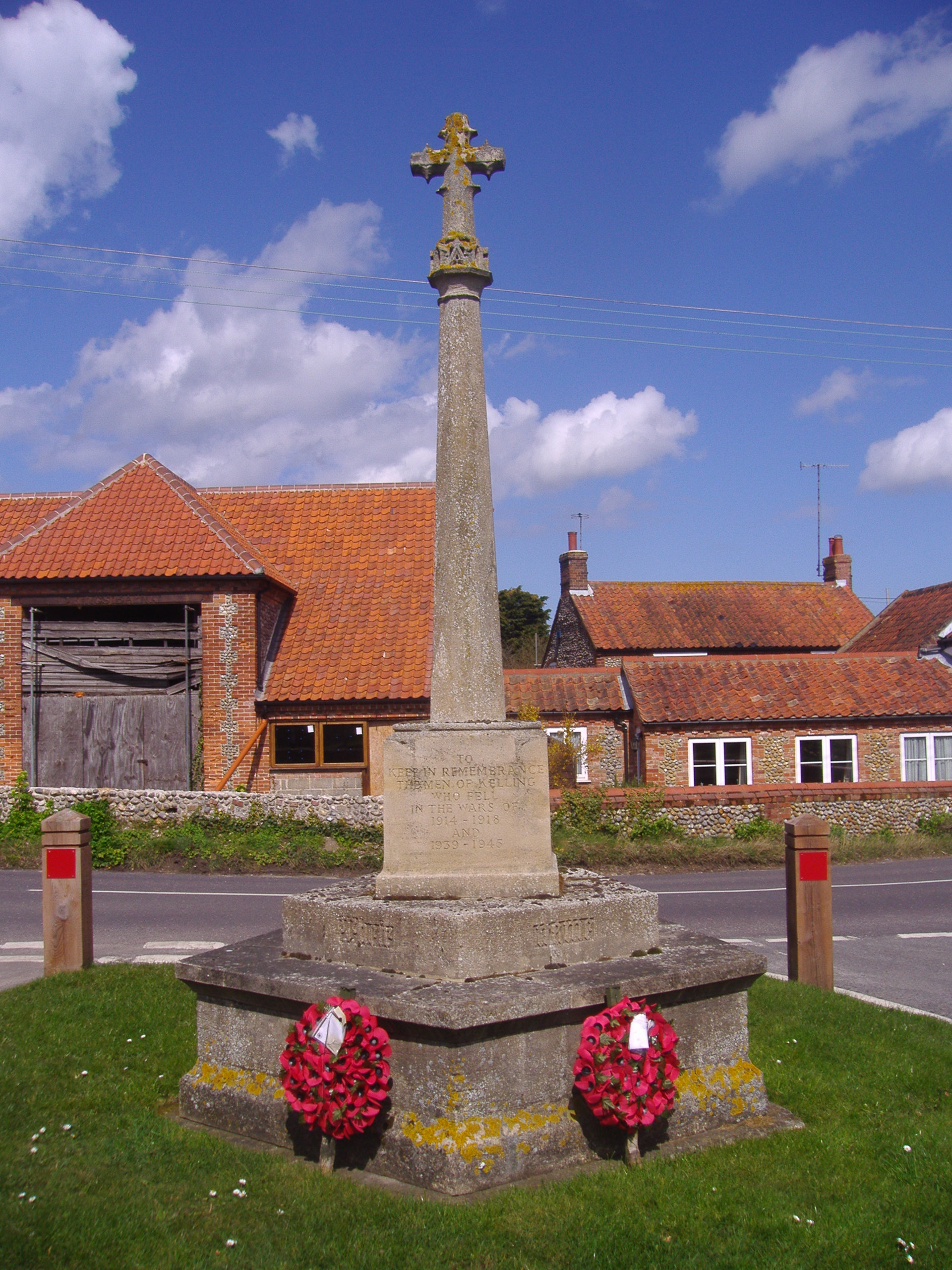
Kelling War Memorial

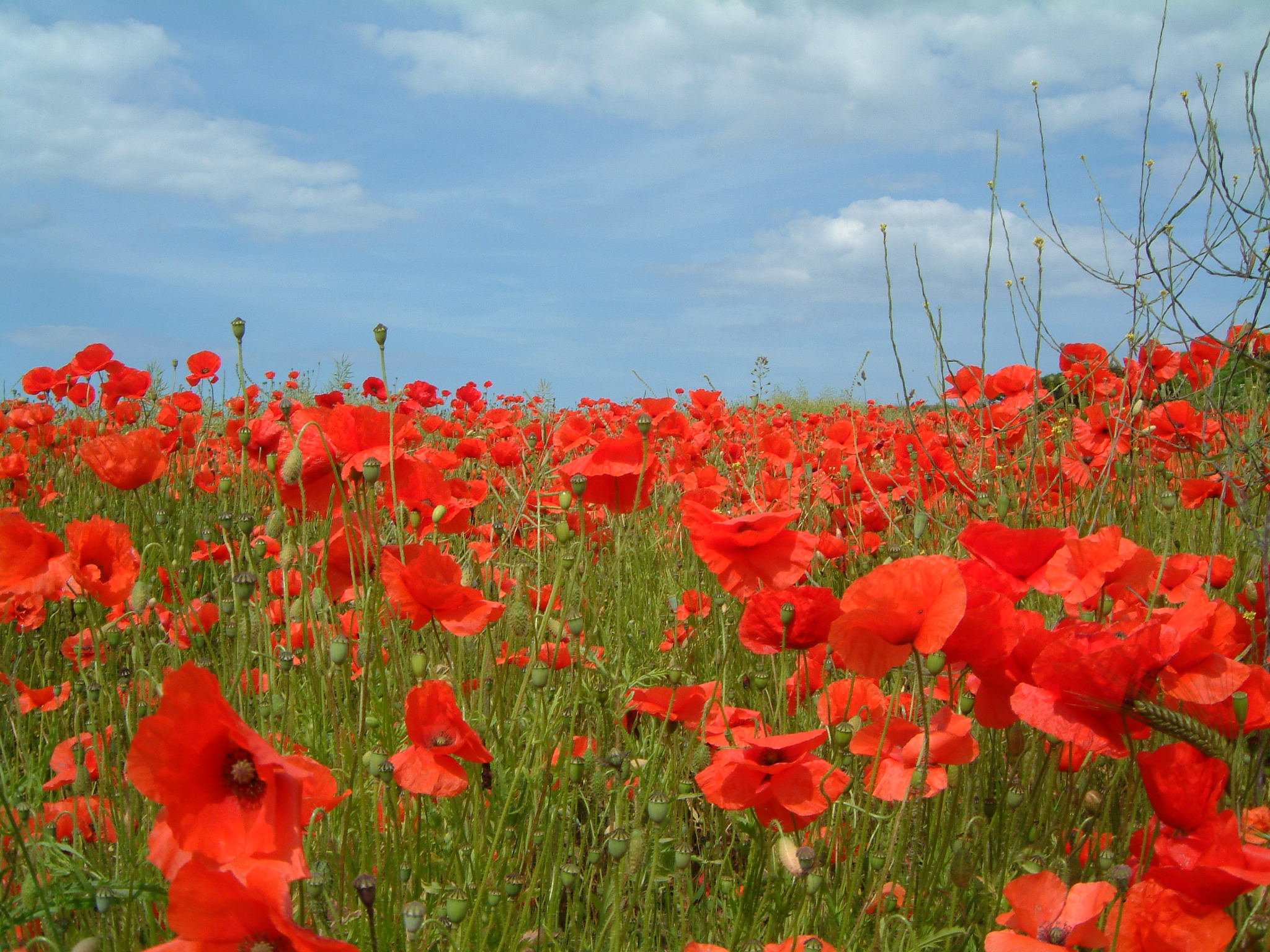
Poppies in field near Kelling June 2002

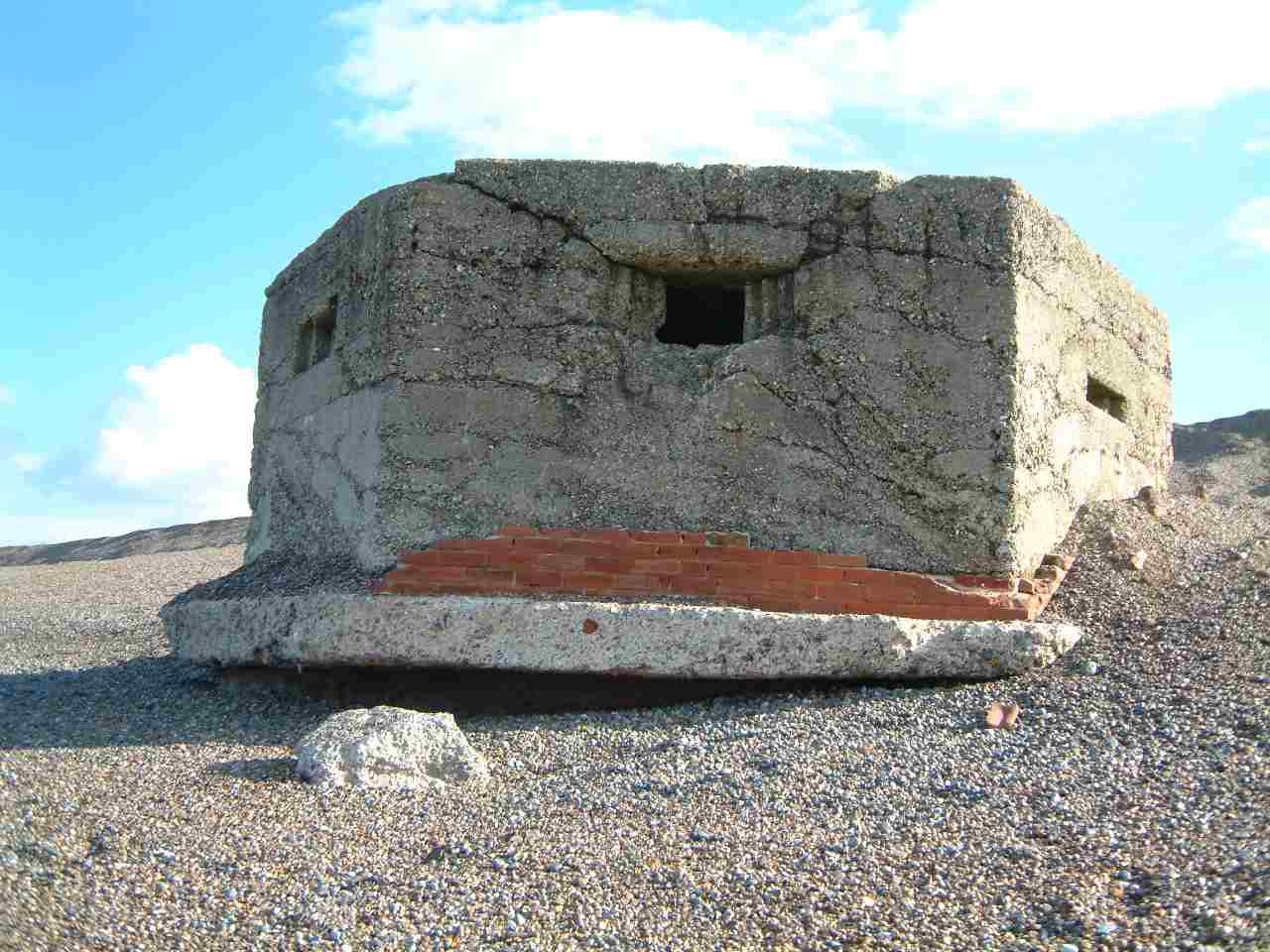
World War II Type 22 Pillbox on the shingle beach at Kelling

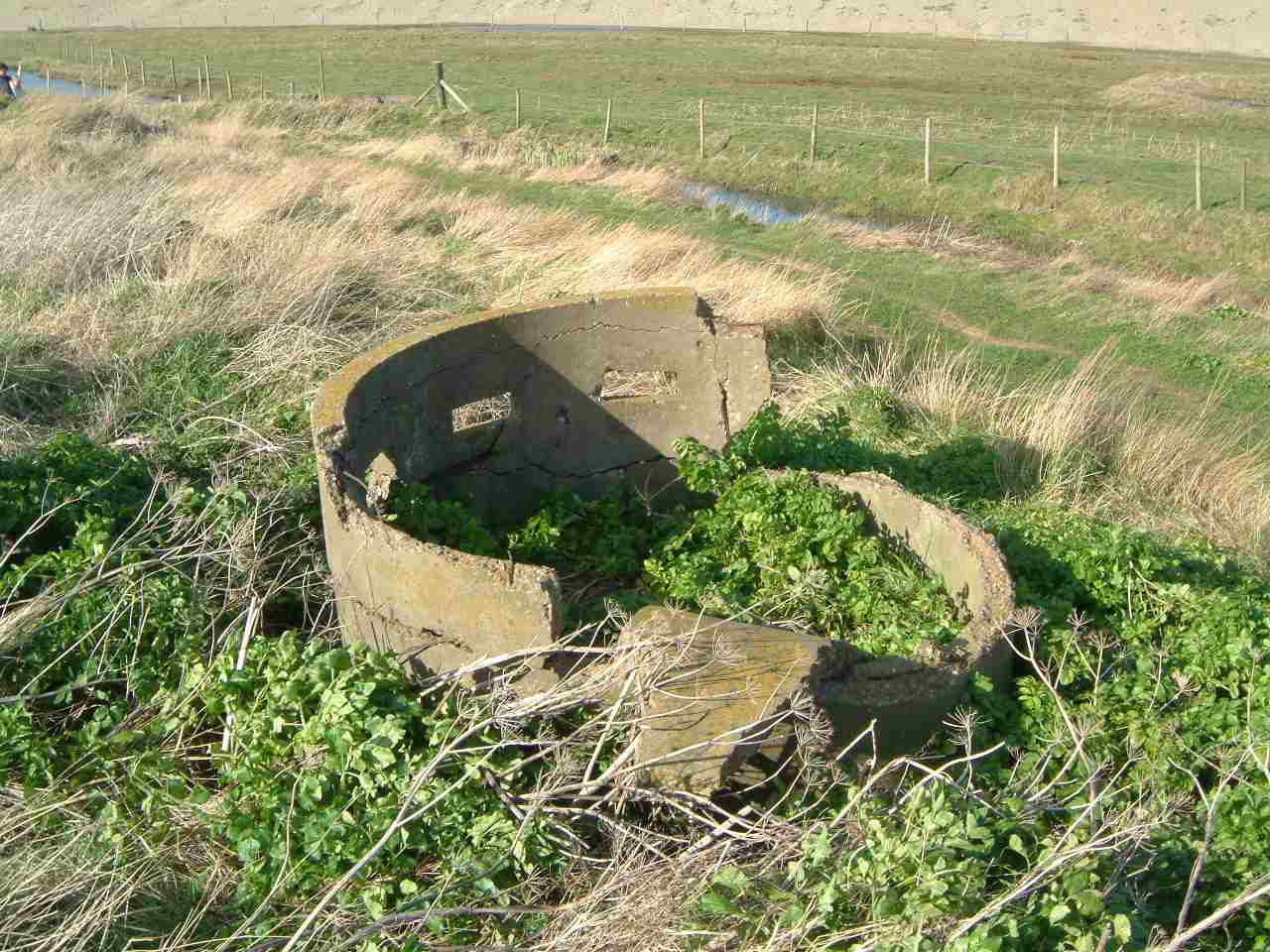
World War II Norcon pillbox on Kelling Hard

== See also ==
- Kelling Hall
- Home Place, Kelling
- Kelling Heath

=== Neighbouring villages ===
- Weybourne
- Salthouse
- High Kelling
- Cley next the Sea
- Wiveton
