= Butterfly plan =

Type of architectural plan

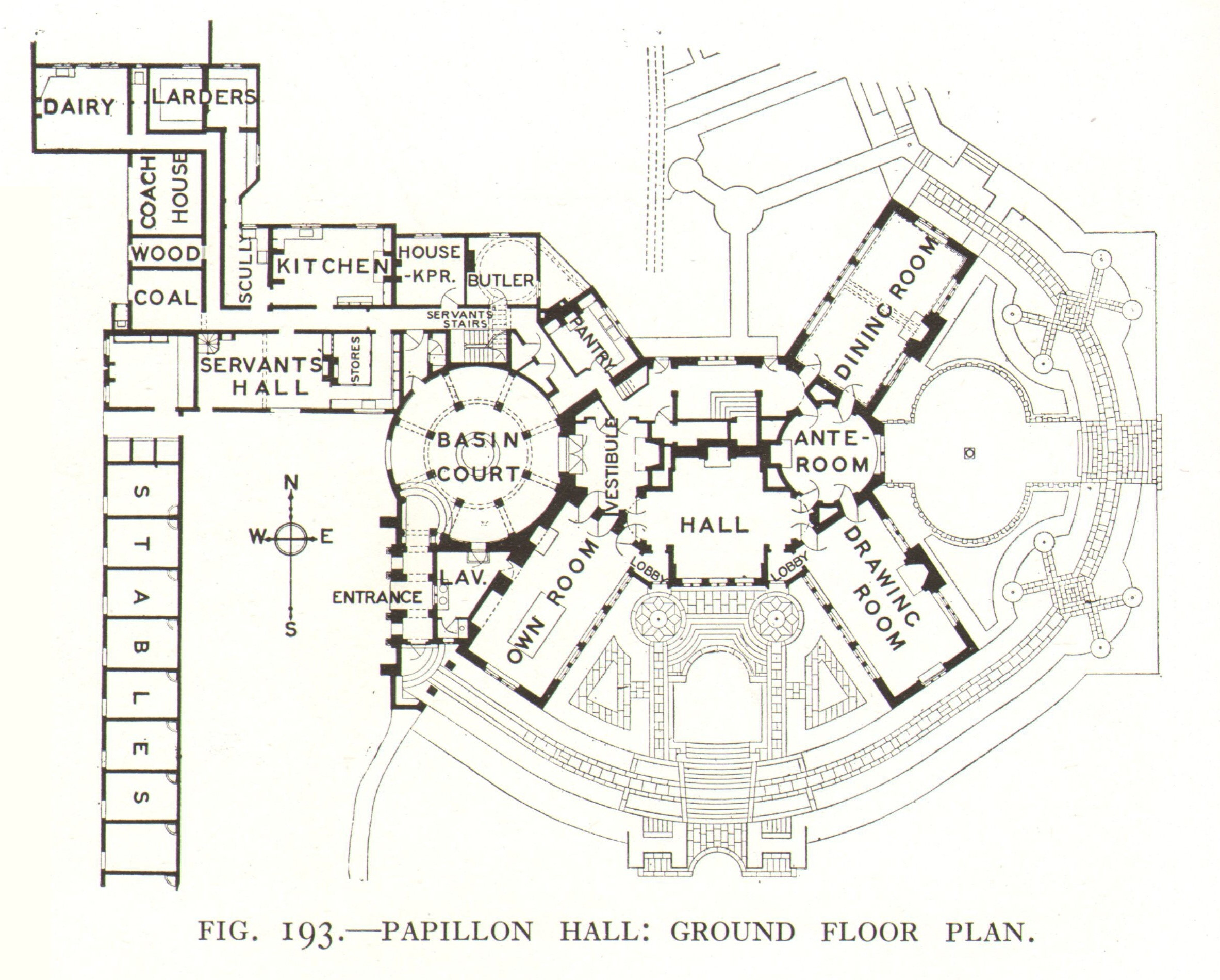
Plan of Papillon Hall, Leicestershire

A Butterfly plan, also known as a Double Suntrap plan, is a type of architectural plan in which two or more wings of a house are constructed at an angle to the core, usually at approximately 45 degrees to the wall of the core building. It was used primarily in late Victorian architecture and during the early Arts and Crafts movement.

== History ==
Westwood House, Worcestershire, was a 17-century precursor. After the original, rectangular house was begun c. 1612, four diagonal wings were added at some time later in the same century.

Victorian interest in the plan originated in the 1891 remodelling of Chesters, Northumberland, by Norman Shaw. To the original, square house of 1771 he added five wings; three of these were diagonal, creating suntrap flanks for the south and west fronts.

The principle of the butterfly plan was also re-adapted within an overall rectangular overall form, as for instance in Kallio Library in Helsinki, Finland, by architect Karl Hård af Segerstad, completed in 1902.

Notable Arts and Crafts examples:

- The Barn, Exmouth, Devon, by Edward Schroeder Prior (1897)
- Happisburgh Manor, Happisburgh, Norfolk, by Detmar Blow to a concept by Ernest Gimson (1900)
- Papillon Hall, Lubenham, Leicestershire,. David Papillon (1581-1659) a French Huguenot and Military architect built it in 1620. In about 1903 it was redesigned by Edwin Lutyens and demolished in 1950
- Home Place, Kelling, Norfolk, by Edward Schroeder Prior (1903–4)
- Kelling Hall, Kelling, Norfolk, by Edward Maufe (1913)
- Yaffle Hill, Broadstone, Dorset, by Edward Maufe (1930)

== Gallery ==
Westwood House

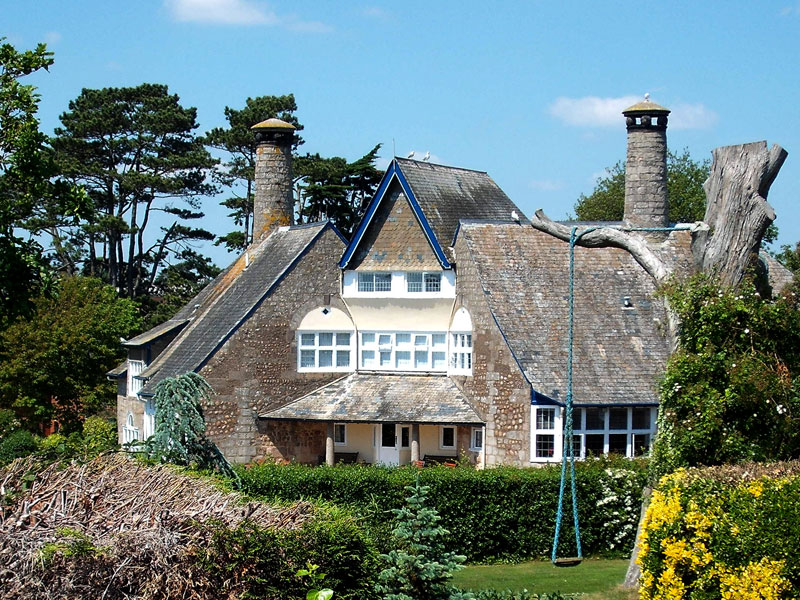
The Barn

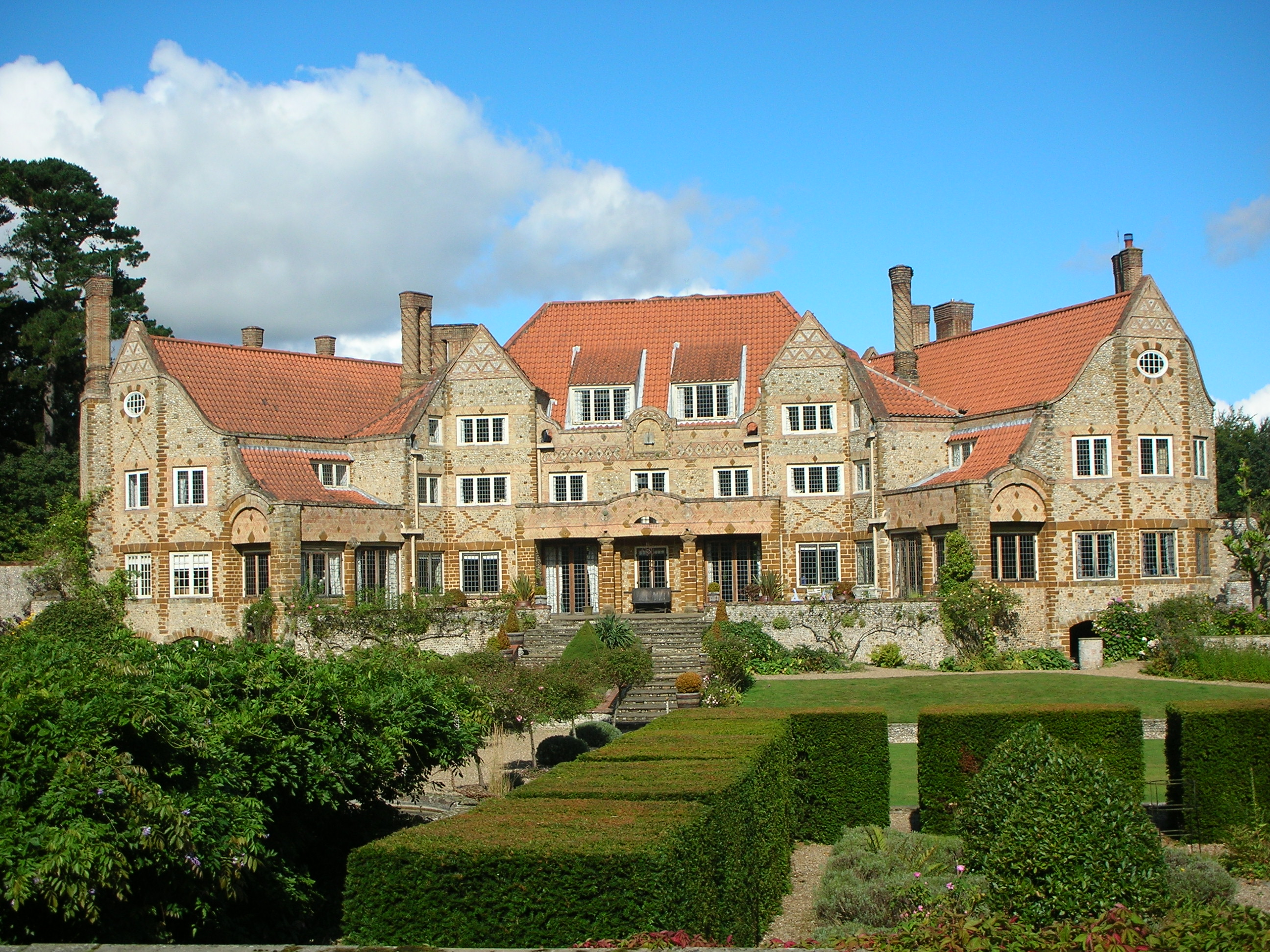
Home Place

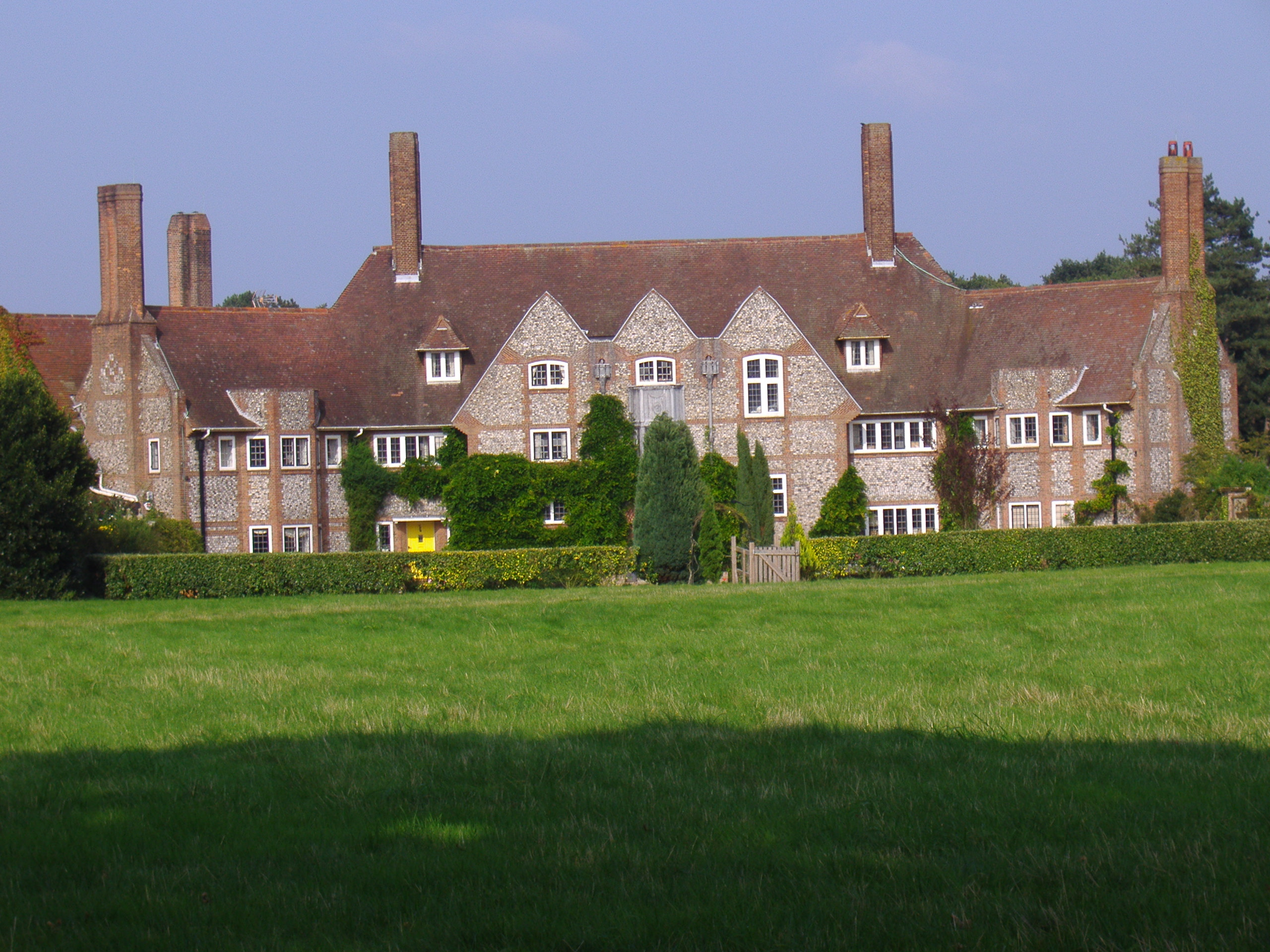
Kelling Hall

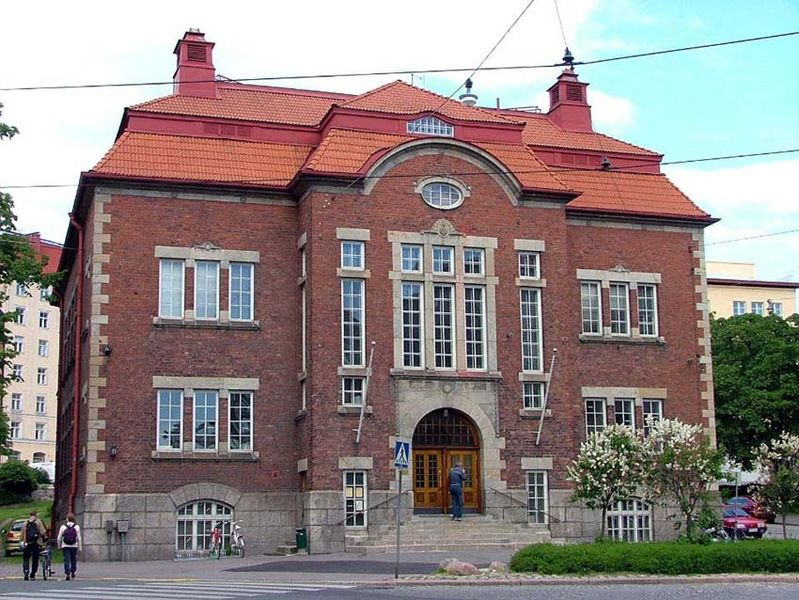
Kallio Library, Helsinki
