= High Kelling =

Village in Norfolk, England

Coordinates: 52.91465°N 1.12867°E

- Location within Norfolk
- Area: 0.57 sq mi (1.5 km^{2})
- Population: 491 (2021 census)
  - Density: 861/sq mi (332/km^{2})
- OS grid reference: TG105391
- Civil parish: High Kelling
- District: North Norfolk
- Shire county: Norfolk
- Region: East
- Country: England
- Sovereign state: United Kingdom
- Post town: HOLT
- Postcode district: NR25
- Dialling code: 01263
- Police: Norfolk
- Fire: Norfolk
- Ambulance: East of England
- UK Parliament: North Norfolk

High Kelling is a village and civil parish in the English county of Norfolk.

High Kelling is 1.7 miles (2.7 km) east of Holt and 7.8 miles (12.6 km) west of Cromer, along the A148 road.

== History ==
High Kelling's name is of Anglo-Saxon origin and derives from the Old English for the higher part of Cylla's people.

In 1957, the remains of a Roman building were discovered in Kelling which were excavated by students at Gresham's School. Furthermore, several hoards of Roman coins have been discovered by metal detectorists.

In the Domesday Book, Kelling is listed as a settlement of 81 households in the hundred of Holt. In 1086, the village was part of the East Anglian estates of Hugh d'Avranches, Roger, son of Rainard and Ralph, son of Hagni.

Between 1903 and 1905, Home Place was built as the residence of the Reverend Percy R. Lloyd by Edward Schroeder Prior in the Arts and Crafts Style.

During the First World War, several practice trenches were dug on Kelling Heath for the purposes of troop training. During the Second World War, the heath was used for training exercises by the United States Army Air Forces.

The heritage railway of the North Norfolk Railway known as the "Poppy Line" runs from near-by Sheringham via Weybourne to Holt.

== Geography ==
According to the 2021 census, High Kelling has a population of 491 people which shows a decrease from the 536 people recorded in the 2011 census.

Kelling Heath is a Site of Special Scientific Interest.

The A148, between Cromer and King's Lynn, passes through the village.

== All Saints' Church ==
All Saints' Church was previously the chapel for a tuberculosis sanatorium that stood in the village and became the parish church in the 1950s.

== Amenities ==
High Kelling has its own post office and shop located on the Cromer Road (A148). In Selbrigg Road there is a nursery which sells locally grown plants and shrubs. Kelling Hospital is situated on a site of 8.5 hectares and provides a range of services and care. The site is also used on a regular basis as a destination for mobile diagnostic service such as breast cancer screening. The hospital is also the site of the Holt Medical Practice.

== Governance ==
High Kelling is part of the electoral ward of Holt for local elections and is part of the district of North Norfolk.

The village's national constituency is North Norfolk, which has been represented by the Liberal Democrat Steff Aquarone MP since 2024.

== See also ==
- Kelling also known as Lower Kelling and as Low Kelling
- Kelling Heath
- Home Place, Kelling
