= Frederic Meyrick-Jones =

English cricketer, clergyman, and school teacher

Frederick Meyrick-Jones
Personal information
- Full name: Frederick Meyrick Meyrick-Jones
- Born: 14 January 1867; Blackheath, Kent
- Died: 25 October 1950 (aged 83); Shaftesbury, Dorset
- Batting: Right-handed
- Bowling: Right-arm slow
- Role: Wicket-keeper

Domestic team information
- Years: Team
- 1886–1890: Hampshire
- 1887–1888: Cambridge University
- 1893–1896: Kent
- 1909: Norfolk
- FC debut: 12 May 1887 Cambridge University v CI Thornton's XI
- Last FC: 6 July 1896 Kent v Sussex

Career statistics
Competition	First-class
Matches	18
Runs scored	512
Batting average	18.96
100s/50s	0/2
Top score	67
Balls bowled	146
Wickets	2
Bowling average	43.50
5 wickets in innings	0
10 wickets in match	0
Best bowling	1/3
Catches/stumpings	9/2
- Source: CricInfo, 9 December 2018

The Reverend Frederick Meyrick Meyrick-Jones (14 January 1867 – 25 October 1950), born Frederic Meyrick Jones, was an English clergyman, school teacher and cricketer who played in 18 first-class cricket matches between 1887 and 1896 as a wicket-keeper.

== Early life ==
Meyrick-Jones was born at Blackheath in what was then part of Kent in 1867, the son of the Reverend George Meyrick-Jones. He was educated at Marlborough College where he played cricket for the school team as a "hard-hitting batsman" before going up to Trinity College, Cambridge. He played occasionally for the Gentlemen of Hampshire team and for Hampshire County Cricket Club between 1886 and 1890 at a time whilst the county was not considered first-class, and made his first-class debut for Cambridge University in 1887. He played against the touring Australians in 1888 and won a Blue the same year. As well as cricket, Meyrick-Jones played racquets at school and university, winning the Challenge Cup in 1888.

== Professional and sporting life ==
After graduating, Meyrick-Jones was ordained and became a curate and a preparatory school master at Elstree School where he was also curate until 1896 when he moved to St Agnes Church in Bristol, changing his surname from Jones to Meyrick-Jones in 1893. He played occasional first-class matches for Kent County Cricket Club during this period, making a total of six appearances for the county between 1893 and 1896.

In 1899 he became the manager of the Rugby School Mission, a religious mission in the deprived neighbourhood of Notting Dale in North Kensington, West London, aimed at improving conditions for the population of the area. He served there until 1905, promoting rugby union in the area, afterwards moving to Holt in Norfolk where he ran a private school teaching boys classed as "difficult", based from 1909 to 1915 at Voewood just outside the town. He made a single appearance for Norfolk County Cricket Club in the Minor Counties Championship in 1909.

As well as cricket, Meyrick-Jones played racquets, competing in the first Racquets Championships at Queen's Club, and was an accomplished billiards player.

== Family and later life ==
Meyrick-Jones married Olive White in 1908, with whom he had one son. He is notable for restoring Woodlands Manor at Mere in Wiltshire from 1922, an early attempt to restore a medieval manor house. The house had been in his family since the 18th century and is now a Grade I listed building. He died at Shaftesbury in Dorset in 1950 aged 83. His Wisden obituary noted that he had been "an antiquarian of some note".

== Bibliography ==
- Carlaw, Derek (2020). Kent County Cricketers, A to Z: Part One (1806–1914) (PDF). Cardiff: ACS.
