= Elstree School =

Preparatory school in Berkshire, England

- Elstree School building from side

Location
- Woolhampton; Reading, Berkshire, RG7 5TD; England
- 51.40383°N 1.17213°W

Information
- Type: Independent
- Motto: Clarior Ex Obscuro (Brighter, out of the darkness)
- Religious affiliation: Christian
- Established: 1848; 178 years ago
- Local authority: West Berkshire
- Department for Education URN: 110140 Tables
- Head teacher: Sid Inglis
- Gender: Co-educational
- Age: 3 to 13
- Houses: North, South, East and West
- Colours: Blue, red, green and yellow (respectively)
- Website: www.elstreeschool.org.uk

Listed Building – Grade II*
- Official name: Elstree School, Woolhampton House
- Designated: 9 September 1969
- Reference no.: 1117267

Elstree School is an English preparatory school for children aged 3–13 at Woolhampton House in Woolhampton, near Newbury, in the English county of Berkshire. The school is co-educational.

== History ==
=== 1848–1938 in Elstree, Hertfordshire ===
The school was founded in 1848 in Elstree, Hertfordshire, at Hill House on Elstree Hill, an 18th-century Grade II* listed building. Today, the building is a Bupa care centre.

=== Since 1938 in Woolhampton, Berkshire ===
In 1938 or 1939 at the start of the Second World War (sources differ), staff and 70 boys moved to Woolhampton House in Berkshire which, at the war's end, became Elstree's permanent home, owned and run by the Sanderson family until 1961 when Elstree School was incorporated. Ian Sanderson remained headmaster until 1969 when Terrence McMullen became headmaster.

== The building ==
Elstree School House engraving before 1893

Woolhampton House is a 17th-century Grade II* listed building.

== Notable former pupils ==
- Sir Alexander Robert Badcock (1844–1907), army officer
- James Blunt (b. 1974), singer-songwriter
- Edwin Bramall, Baron Bramall (1923–2019), field marshal
- John R. Buckmaster (1915–1983), actor
- Sandy Wilson (1924–2014), songwriter-lyricist
- Christopher Bonham-Carter (1907–1975), naval officer
- Felix Cassel (1869–1953), lawyer
- Charles Montagu Doughty (1843–1926), poet, writer and traveller
- Rookes Evelyn Bell Crompton (1845–1940), engineer
- Sebastian Faulks (b. 1953), novelist
- Walter George Headlam (1866–1908), classical scholar and poet
- J. Bruce Ismay (1862–1937), managing director of the White Star Line and survivor of the RMS Titanic
- Sir Philip Bennet Joubert de la Ferté (1887–1965), Royal Air Force Commander
- Archibald Campbell [Archie] MacLaren (1871–1944), cricketer
- George Monbiot (b. 1963), environmental activist and writer
- Richard Tice (b. 1964), politician
- John Whitehead (1860–1899), ornithologist and explorer
- George Ratcliffe Woodward (1848–1934), Anglican priest

== Notable teachers ==
- William Bather (1861–1939), first-class cricketer, was assistant master at the school 1884–1894
- Danyl Johnson, singer on series 9 of The X-Factor, dance teacher
- Frederic Meyrick-Jones (1867–1950), taught at the school from 1894 to 1896
- Edgar Stogdon (1870–1951), athlete and cricketer, was headmaster from 1900 to 1903

== Sports ==
During the autumn term, soccer is the main sport, along with hockey and tennis. During the Lent term, rugby takes over from soccer, and hockey and cross country running continue. During the summer term, cricket is the main school sport, with swimming, athletics and tennis also popular throughout the term. The school's sports day is the focus of a pupil's summer term.

== See also ==
- Grade II* listed buildings in Berkshire

== Bibliography ==
- Hugo Vickers, Elstree 175: Celebrating 175 years of Elstree School (London: Unicorn, 6 July 2023) ISBN 978-1911397380
- I. C. M. Sanderson, A History of Elstree School and Three Generations of the Sanderson Family, Publ. Elstree School, 1978 (privately published)
- John Eddison, A History of Elstree School, 1979 (mentioned in: Frances Wilson, How to Survive the Titanic Or the Sinking of J. Bruce Ismay, Chapter 3, Note 10)
