= Kelling Hall =

Grade ll building in Kelling, Norfolk, England

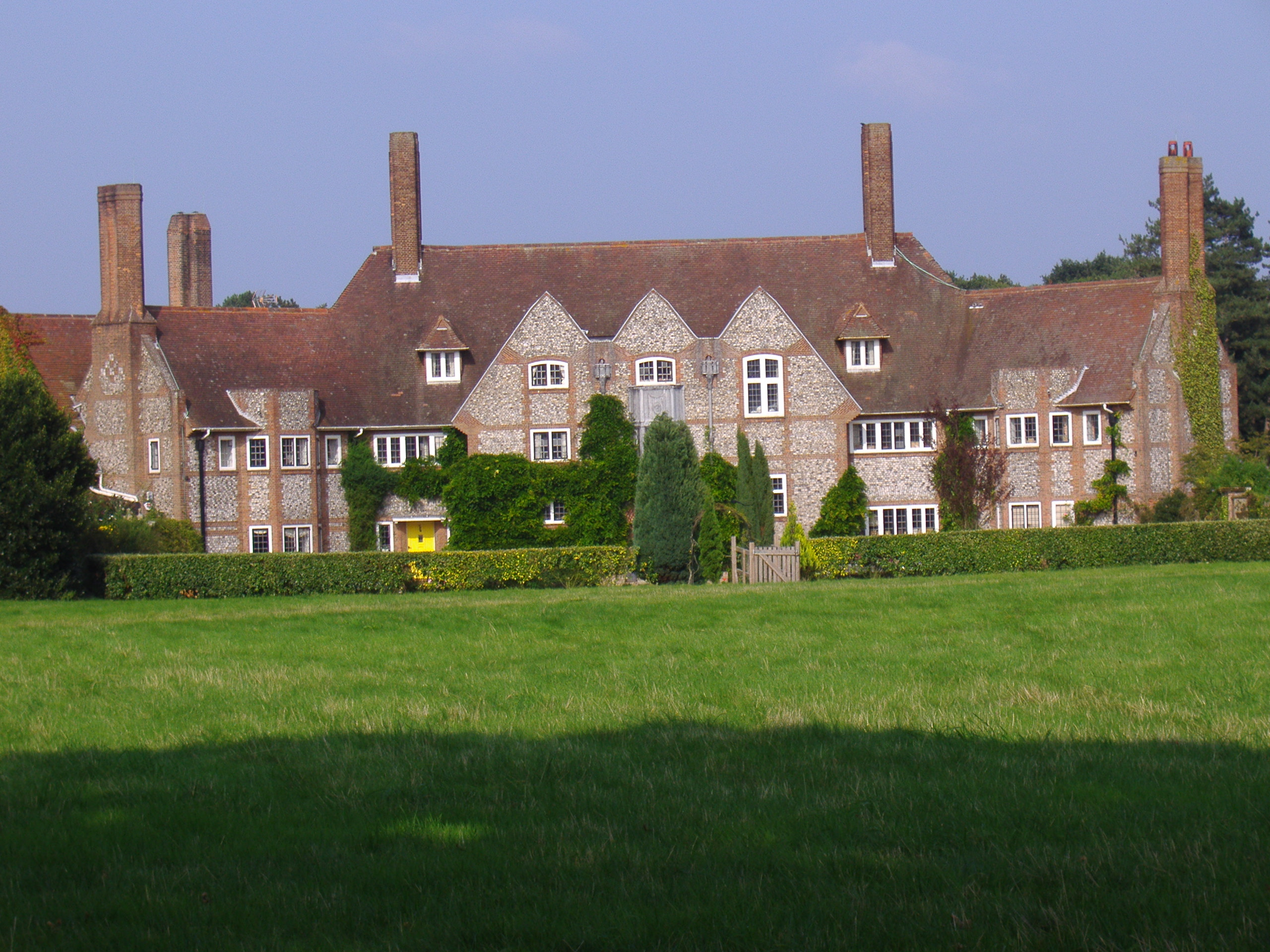
- Kelling Hall. South-west elevation
- Interactive map of the Kelling Hall area

General information
- Architectural style: Arts and Craft style
- Location: Kelling, England
- Coordinates: 52.9324°N 1.1093°E
- Completed: 1913

Technical details
- Structural system: Norfolk Red Brick, Flintwork with tiled roof

Design and construction
- Architect: Sir Edward Maufe

Kelling Hall is a Grade II* listed building situated in the civil parish of Kelling in the English county of Norfolk. It is 0.7 miles from the parish of Holt and overlooks the North Norfolk coastline at a height of 171 feet above sea level. The grounds consist of 1,600 acres and originally came with seven cottages, 11 holiday properties and 10 homes in the village of Holt. It was built in 1913 for Henri Deterding, who was one of the founders of the Royal Dutch Petroleum Company. It is noted as being the first design by the architect Sir Edward Maufe who designed it in the Arts and Craft style with a butterfly plan. The hall has a shooting lodge, tennis courts and an outdoor swimming pool. It has five main reception rooms and thirteen bedrooms. The hall was privately owned by James Deterding, the grandson of Henri, until September 2008 when it was sold for £25,000,000 to the recycling tycoon Gary Widdowson, who now resides there with his family. The seven cottages, 11 holiday properties and 10 homes in Holt that originally came with Kelling Hall, now belong to Kelling Estates, who operate a luxury holiday business. It was once the home of film star Richard Greene, best known as Robin Hood in the 1950s TV series.
