= The Barn, Exmouth =

Hotel in Devon, England

Coordinates: 50.6114°N 3.3947°W

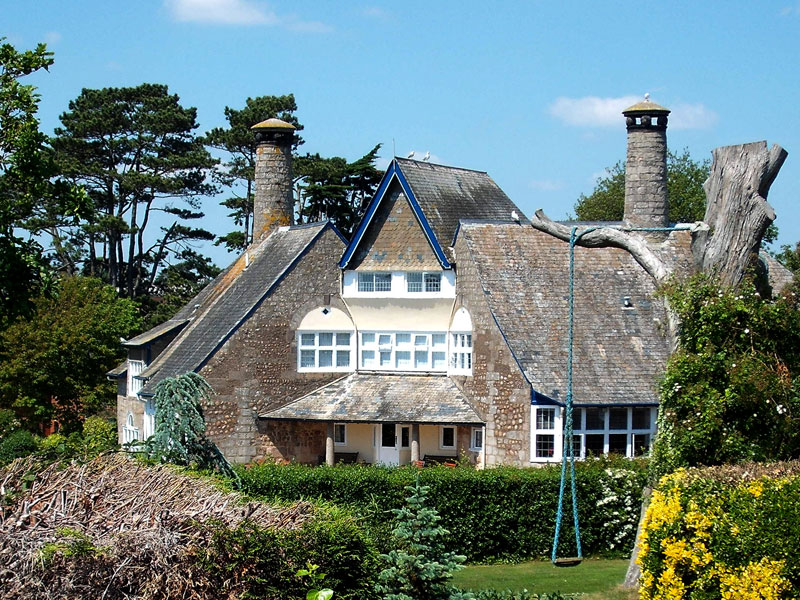
The Barn, Exmouth

The Barn, in Exmouth, Devon, England, is a seaside house, now a hotel, dating from 1896 and designed in Arts and Crafts style by the architect Edward Schroeder Prior. It is a Grade II* listed building.

Prior's most influential and perhaps extraordinary building, the house demonstrates all of Prior's concerns at the time. It was reported in Hermann Muthesius’s The English House of 1904–05 and gained considerable fame. Indeed, Muthesius adapted the plan for his Freudenberg House in Berlin of 1907–08 and the house influenced architects such as Thilo Schroder, Otto Bartning and Bruno Taut.

Based on what became known as a butterfly plan, the design was similar to that of a cottage model exhibited to considerable acclaim by Prior at the Royal Academy in 1895. It is possible that Prior got the commission as a result of the model being seen by the client, Major Henry Wetherall. However Wetherall was an Old Harrovian and had known the Priors all his life.

The Barn has two wings radiating from a central six-sided, double-height hall. The house is orientated to the south. The garden side is broken to capture the sun between the two wings. The east wing contains the dining room which faces the garden, kitchen and service quarters. The west wing contains the drawing room, study and staircase. A gallery over the hall connects the bedrooms in the east and west wing on the first floor. A central stair leads from the first floor to the attic rooms, that were additions to the scheme depicted in the model. The attic rooms were originally nurseries. Other alterations to the model scheme included a basement darkroom and a lift, and floor level changes to accommodate the site's topography.

The house is designed to be orientated to the sun and views. Its butterfly plan enabled Prior to make the best use of the site and to integrate the house and garden. The wings embrace the entrance courtyard at the front, and at the back open up the house into the garden through a roughed verandah. Prior designed the house and the garden as a whole scheme. Prior described the aims of this planning and aesthetic:

"Its enclosing walls, 9ft high and thatched for coping, will give shade; its angles provide arbours and shelter from every wind, so that hour by hour, and day after day, there can always be ease and delight in it and never monotony as the seasons come and go and cloud and sunshine alternate."

The walls were curved to echo the original thatch. The columns of the verandah echo the smooth, curved chimneys.

The two wings radiating from the six-sided hall embody a ten-faced, symmetrical plan. The symmetry is part reinforced and part broken by the handling of voids. The north entrance porch and the arches over the bedroom windows in the south facade reinforce the symmetry, whereas the south west porch, the bays and the windows provide asymmetry. The asymmetric disposition of the functions of the rooms is reflected in the positioning of the windows.

Horizontality is emphasised by the linearity of the casement windows and the verandah, verticality by the central gable and tall, slender chimney stacks.

By 1897 Prior had developed his theory of texture. Prior tried to find a way beyond historical style and vernacular logic. The wall surfaces are highly textured, incorporating the philosophy Prior expounded in his paper. The cavity walls are of brick, with a locally quarried red sandstone outer leaf. Pebbles from the beach and river are embedded in the mass concrete, adding pattern and texture to the walls. The stone is roughly dressed, uncoursed and varied by the inclusion of large boulders. The building was originally thatched. The large chimney stacks were lined with terracotta flues and cased in sandstone with spark arresters. The upper floors were constructed of concrete reinforced with nine inch logs at two and a half foot centres. This was partly done as fireproofing.

Little information is available on the building procedure adopted for The Barn. It is not known whether Prior used a traditional contract system, or the clerk of works and day labour approach he operated at Home Place, Kelling and the Burton Bradstock Church restoration scheme. Prior produced plans and sections for the house, but no elevations are known. He may have used a model to guide the building process. Certainly some aspects of the building were decided upon as building progressed, particularly the texturing and use of materials on the facades.

The Barn suffered a serious fire in October 1905. The internal design was unfortunately lost; the internal balcony and concrete floors (with timber reinforcement) no longer exist. The house was restored by the Bristol firm of Jacob Williams with a slate roof and gables. The wings of the front entrance were also altered in a sympathetic fashion, squaring up the walls and enlarging them.

The Barn is now a hotel. It remains largely intact, as do its gardens. The interiors have suffered a little from modernisation.
