= John Stogdon =

English cricketer

John Hubert Stogdon (25 April 1876 – 17 December 1944) was an English first-class cricketer active 1896–1909 who played for Middlesex, Marylebone Cricket Club (MCC) and Cambridge University. He was born in Harrow; died in Pinner. He was educated at Harrow School for whom he played cricket.

His elder brother, Edgar, played in two first-class matches for Cambridge University in 1893.
