= Home Place, Kelling =

House in Kelling, Norfolk, England

Coordinates: 52.9150°N 1.1196°E

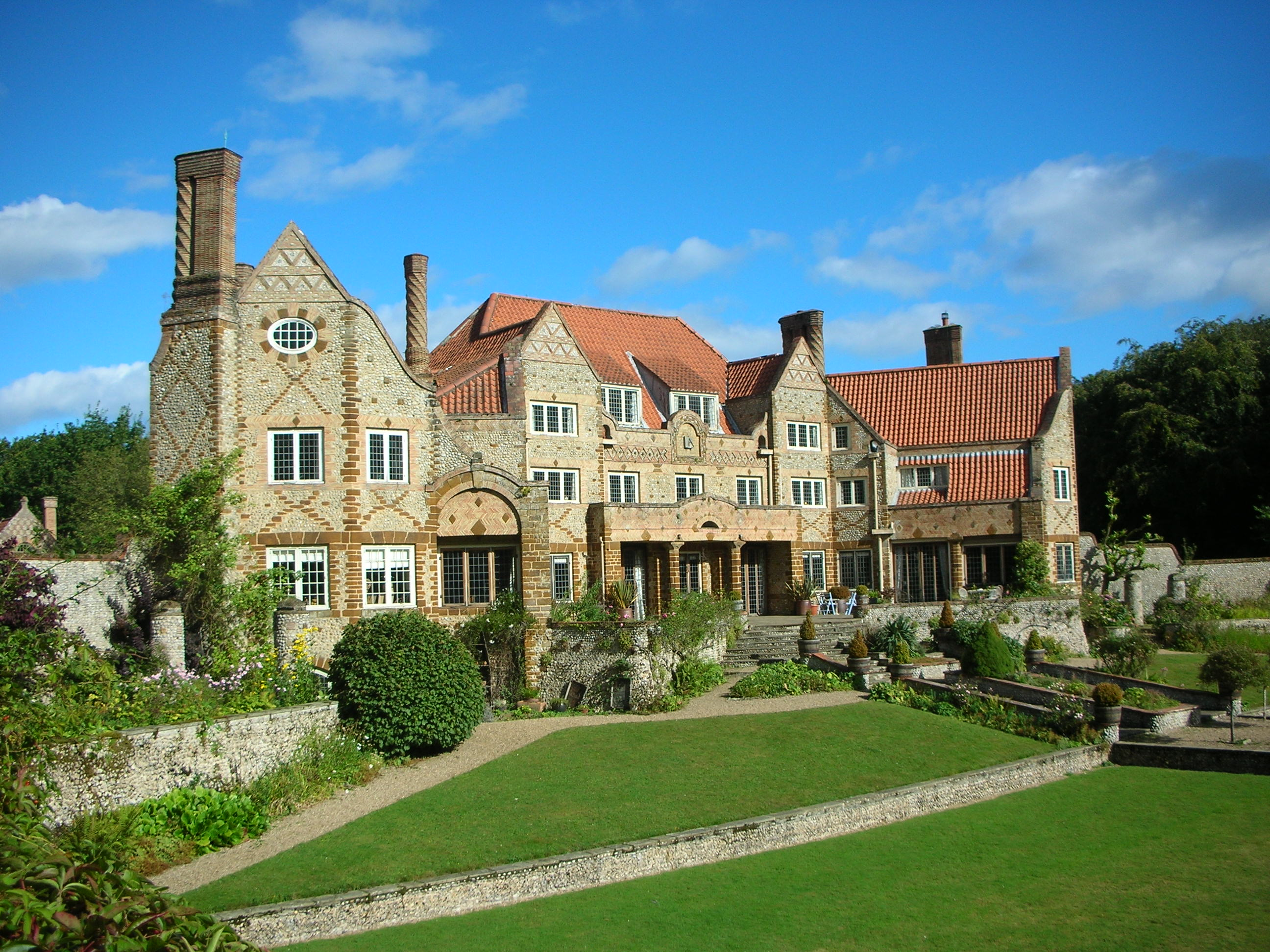
Voewood in 2012

Home Place, also called Voewood, is an Arts and Crafts style house in High Kelling, near Holt, Norfolk, England, designed (1903–5) by Edward Schroeder Prior. It is a Grade II* listed building. The gardens, also designed by Prior, are Grade II* listed in the National Register of Historic Parks and Gardens.

Home Place is perhaps one of the greatest achievements of house design of the Arts and Crafts movement. More than almost any other building of the period the house fulfils the ideals for architecture developed by John Ruskin and William Morris. The design of Home Place saw Prior return to and extend further the aspects of design that had preoccupied him in The Barn, Exmouth. In the designing and building of Home Place many of his philosophical ideas found physical expression.

Its design and construction were characterised by the use of radical planning and forms, innovative technologies, such as the use of reinforced concrete, extensive external decoration, a distinct building philosophy involving craftsmanship and the use of quality local materials and the integration of the building and its interiors with the garden and its surroundings.

== History ==
=== Construction ===
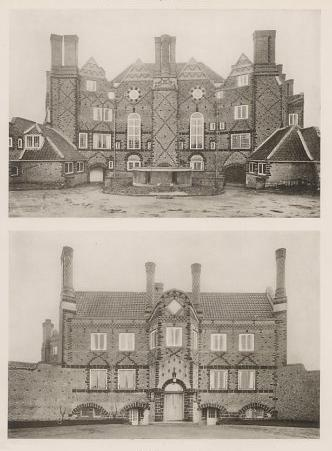
Kelling Place in 1914

Home Place, High Kelling was originally named Voewood, subsequently Kelling Place and Thornfield Hall. It was built for the Reverend Percy Robert Lloyd (1868–1937). Lloyd was the tenth son of the publisher and paper manufacturer Edward Lloyd (1815–1890). He was born in Water House, Walthamstow, which had been the childhood home of William Morris, and educated at Eastbourne College. In 1887 he went up to Pembroke College, Oxford. Both at Eastbourne and Oxford he was a noted athlete, although he suffered periodically from unknown health problems. After taking his degree in 1891 he went to Ely Theological College and was ordained three years later, taking a curacy at St Andrew's Church, Lincoln. He stayed here for six years, during which time he married Dorothea Mallam (1874–1907). She was the eldest child of James Thomas Mallam (1850–1915) of Oxford, a family which had connections with the Pre-Raphaelites. With the help of his wife he translated and arranged in English a Tibetan novel by Albert Arthur Yongden, "Lama Yongden", entitled Mipam. He also co-authored a work on the Habsburgs and Italy. In around 1900 he left Lincoln to undertake work with the Diocese of Norwich. It is at around this point that he presumably commissioned E.S. Prior. The money used to pay for the house - £60,000 - most probably derived from a stake in the family business, now run by his elder brother Frank.

Work began in 1903, with the construction of various outbuildings, including thatched semi-detached gardeners' cottages and a complex of gardens. Initially experiments with construction techniques using materials derived from the site were carried out, for example in the construction of the walls of vegetable garden. The main house was not begun until 1904, when the sunken flower garden, 1-acre (4,000 m^{2}) and 6 ft (1.8 m) deep, was excavated to provide aggregates for the construction of the house itself. Pebbles were used for facing the walls, gravel for concrete and sand for general building purposes. Surface earth was used for the terraces. The excess ballast produced was sold to local authorities. Local carstone was employed, quarried near Sandringham, as were tiles made of local Norfolk clay, though some materials had to be got from Cambridgeshire when supplies ran out. Oak was also obtained locally. The house is constructed of mass concrete made of local lime and the materials derived from the site. The flint facing is tied to the external walls with carstone and fixed to the core with bricks. The lace coursings of tile-bricks binds and reinforces the structure. Galletting with flints was widely used. The floors are of concrete reinforced with iron chains. The roof is covered in local pantiles.

The patterning and modelling of the wall surfaces and the colours and texturing of the building are pronounced. The exterior surfaces are highly decorated. The patterning makes reference to the local tradition of diaper and zigzag patterns in the brickwork of cottages and farm buildings. Tiles were extensively employed, forming the surrounds of the first floor windows, as lintels in herringbone patterns and as decorative bands and patterns. Tiles and narrow courses of brick were used in twisted neo-Tudor chimney stacks. Prior did not employ a general contractor in the building. Electrical services were executed under contract, but the main construction work was supervised and labour and materials purchased by Prior's site clerk, Randall Wells (1877–1942) and Mr Blower, a local bricklayer. Prior believed that contract systems would result in "only the most mechanical expressions of design" being brought to fruition. Randall Wells had been discovered by William Lethaby in 1902 and had acted as his resident clerk of works at All Saints' Church, Brockhampton, Herefordshire. Randall Wells had received a practical training in joinery, founding as well as architecture. He ran his own practice as well as working for other architects.

Unfortunately a new isolation hospital was constructed next door shortly after completion of Home Place. It is believed that Mrs Lloyd, concerned about the possibility of contracting TB from her neighbours in the sanatorium, decided that she could not remain in residence. As a result, the house was rented out shortly after completion. Mrs Lloyd herself died in 1907, and is buried in Cuddesdon in Oxfordshire. It was then used as by the Rev. Frederic Meyrick-Jones as the site for a "crammer" school before being sold to Leicester City Council in 1929. Percy Lloyd lived a nomadic lifestyle after the sale of Home Place. His 'retirement', to the extent that he ever worked, was spent in Italy and the Riviera. He died in 1937 at 2, The Grand Palais, Monte Carlo. He was survived by a son and a daughter.

=== Layout and style ===
The house is based on a butterfly plan. The three storey central portion of the house is flanked by splayed two-storey wings. The plan enabled Prior to maximise views out and to give the best orientation to a range of rooms. He could also relate the external spaces to the internal areas. The area contained within the splay faced the gardens, with the northern of the wings acting as the entrance, with a two-storey porch and daylight basement. This wing also contained the library and billiard room at ground floor level. The wing opposite contained the kitchen and service accommodation together with the dining room. The fruit and vegetable garden lay adjacent. The entrance, through oak doors, leads into a six-sided hall up a straight flight of Hoptonwood stone stairs into an octagonal lobby. The main staircase lies to the left filing the triangular space generated by the butterfly plan. It has a massive oak frame and twisted oak balusters. A corridor with an open oak beam roofs leads from the lobby to the east wing on the garden side. The door to the left immediately before the stairwell leads to the original billiard room. This is essentially an octagonal room with a fireplace to the east. A door at the eastern end provides access to the great hall to the left of the fireplace. To the right of the lobby, a door leads into the library. This is again octagonal, with a fireplace to the north west corner. The room is extensively glazed with fenestration to all walls except that to the hall. The cloister lies to the south wall. It retains its built-in seats facing on to the terraced garden. The cloister served to control natural lighting to the library. The cloister space has now been incorporated into the library by glazing the original open arches with metal framed doors and windows. The original external glazed doors that lead from the library to the cloister have now been removed.

Between the two wings, the three storey body of the house is of two bays flanking a large fireplace. A large double storey hall is placed centrally besides the inglenook fireplace. The inglenook has two small windows and it tiled as is the fire surround. The corridor is separated from the hall space by four oak beams that support the minstrels gallery, that also acts as the corridor connecting the wings on the second floor level. Full height French windows opened from the corridor onto the garden terrace. There was a central window with a built-in timber under-cupboard that was expressed externally, giving the impression from outside that there was a central doorway. A sun lounge has been added covering the original terrace and the original French windows removed. The sun lounge is a typical 1960s structure on a stone faced plinth with a flat roof.

The southern wing contains the dining room and service and servants facilities including a back staircase and original a servants sitting room. This has been incorporated into the kitchen at some point. The corridor from the hall extends past the back staircase, entered from a lobby via a door from the corridor, to the dining room. The room has a fireplace to the south wall with a Hopton stone mantel with a tiled surround and a three faceted bowed façade overlooking the garden, with a light to each façade. French windows originally led into the covered cloister, which was subsequently glazed and incorporated into the room. The steel rod reinforced concrete ceiling beams are exposed in the ceiling. The wings are on two stories with attic space above, illuminated by windows in the gable ends. They contain the principal bedrooms. On the second floor the central block contains the two staircases at either end and their respective landings. The corridor connecting the two wings is slung over part of the double height great hall along the west side, acting as a minstrels gallery. The third floor of the central block contains further bedrooms in the roof space, lit by large dormer windows.

Electrical services were provided at the time of building and included lights, bells, telephones and hot water. Whilst some drawings for such fittings exist for some of Prior's buildings there is only photographic evidence for the furniture and fittings at Home Place. He almost certainly designed further fitted furniture, in, for example, the kitchen and bedrooms of which there is no accurate record. Photographs taken just after completion reveal that a simple approach was taken to the treatments of the interior, with the extensive use of white distemper and untreated or oiled and blackened oak and waxed timber floors, very much in the idiom of the medievalism of Webb's Red House, designed for Morris.

The Great Hall has the character of a late medieval timber-framed building. The timbers supporting the gallery are plain and untreated, whilst the roof timbers and supports appear oiled and blackened, a technique Prior used elsewhere. The floor treatment in the hall was polished wood with Persian runners. Furniture included chairs by Morris and Co., ranging from country chairs to heavy medieval styles, but also Regency period chairs and vernacular craft designs. A series of framed Burne-Jones prints line the gallery and tapestries the other walls. Other furniture includes a dresser similar to those by Morris & Co.

The corridor to the west wall has a heavily beamed and ribbed oak roof, again originally blackened and polished. The doors originally located at either end of the corridor were purpose designed in untreated oak as part of a glazed and top lit oak screen dividing the hall portion of the corridor from the remainder of the passage. They were half glazed with small panels similar to those of the main fenestration. Scratch plates were designed by Prior in brass, probably with the "tree of life" pattern he used in other buildings. The inglenook included built settles within the nooks with full height leather backs.

The French windows to the garden terrace were full height and oak framed, with small glazing panels. Heavy plain curtains were hung on what appear to be plain tubular rails, probably of brass. The stair hall shows a similar approach to finishes and furnishings. The stair itself is of oak with high quality joinery as in all Prior's buildings. The twisted oak balustrade echos the form of the twisting chimneys outside. Oak panelling was used in the billiard room and included Prior's usual use of built in facilities. Ceiling treatments were generally simple, in white distemper. Lighting fittings were typical of the Arts and Craft Movement with a range of ceiling and wall lighting fittings, generally with luminaires suspended by chains with glass shades.

=== Gardens ===
The gardens were of great renown and highly regarded. Home Place was perhaps Prior's greatest garden design. Garden making was a preoccupation of his middle period. Terraces extend from the wings of the house and end in steps leading down to the garden level. The garden is also reached from the terrace by a double flight of steps leading to two stone paths, separated by a water feature in the form of a stepped stone tank containing water-lilies, iris and forget-me-not. The central feature of the garden is a large basin. Pergolas with masonry walls lead east and west.

The garden at Home Place was admired by Gertrude Jekyll and Sir Lawrence Weaver, who described and illustrated it in their book Gardens for Small Country Houses; "The stepped scheme at Home Place, Holt, designed by Professor E.S. Prior will be a counsel of perfection to most people".

During its long career as an institution and hotel several major alterations have been carried out to the house. Externally the most notable alteration has been the addition of a bow fronted garden room to the terrace cloister of the garden from the main block and the in-filling of the garden cloister. This appears to have been carried out in the 1930s. The cloister has been in-filled with steel framed windows and doors of typical design of the period. Many of the original casement windows have also been replaced with steel frame windows.

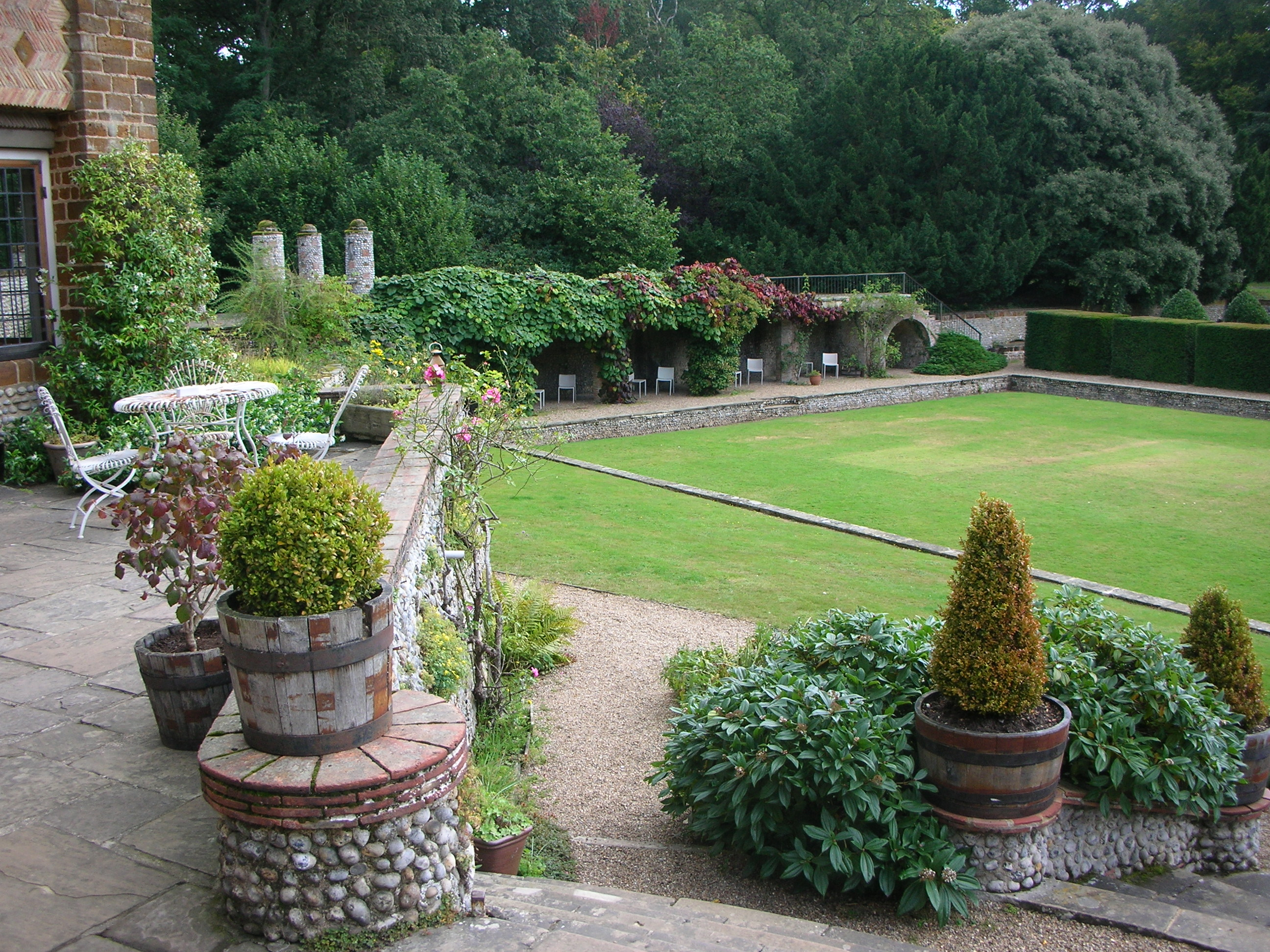

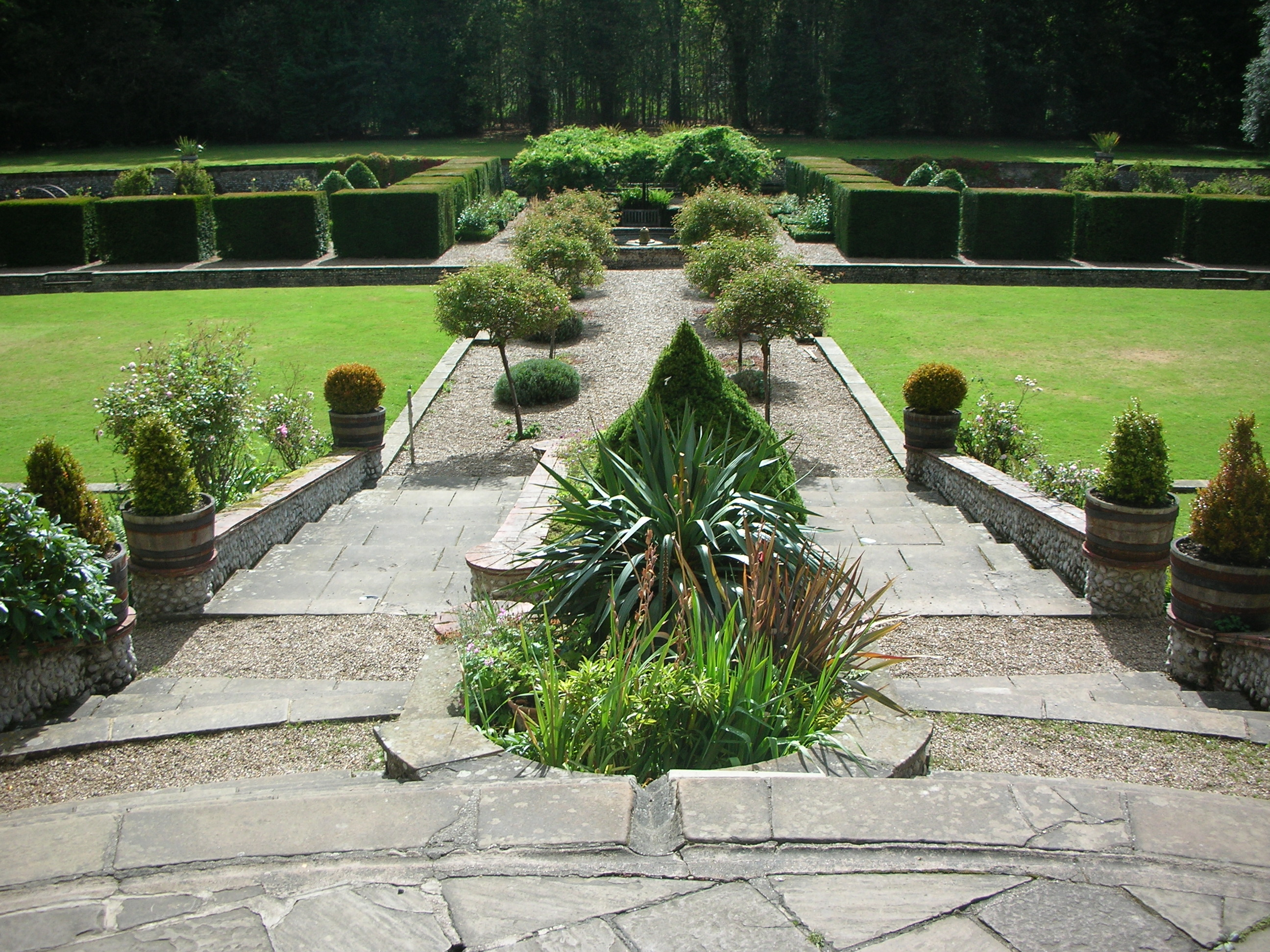

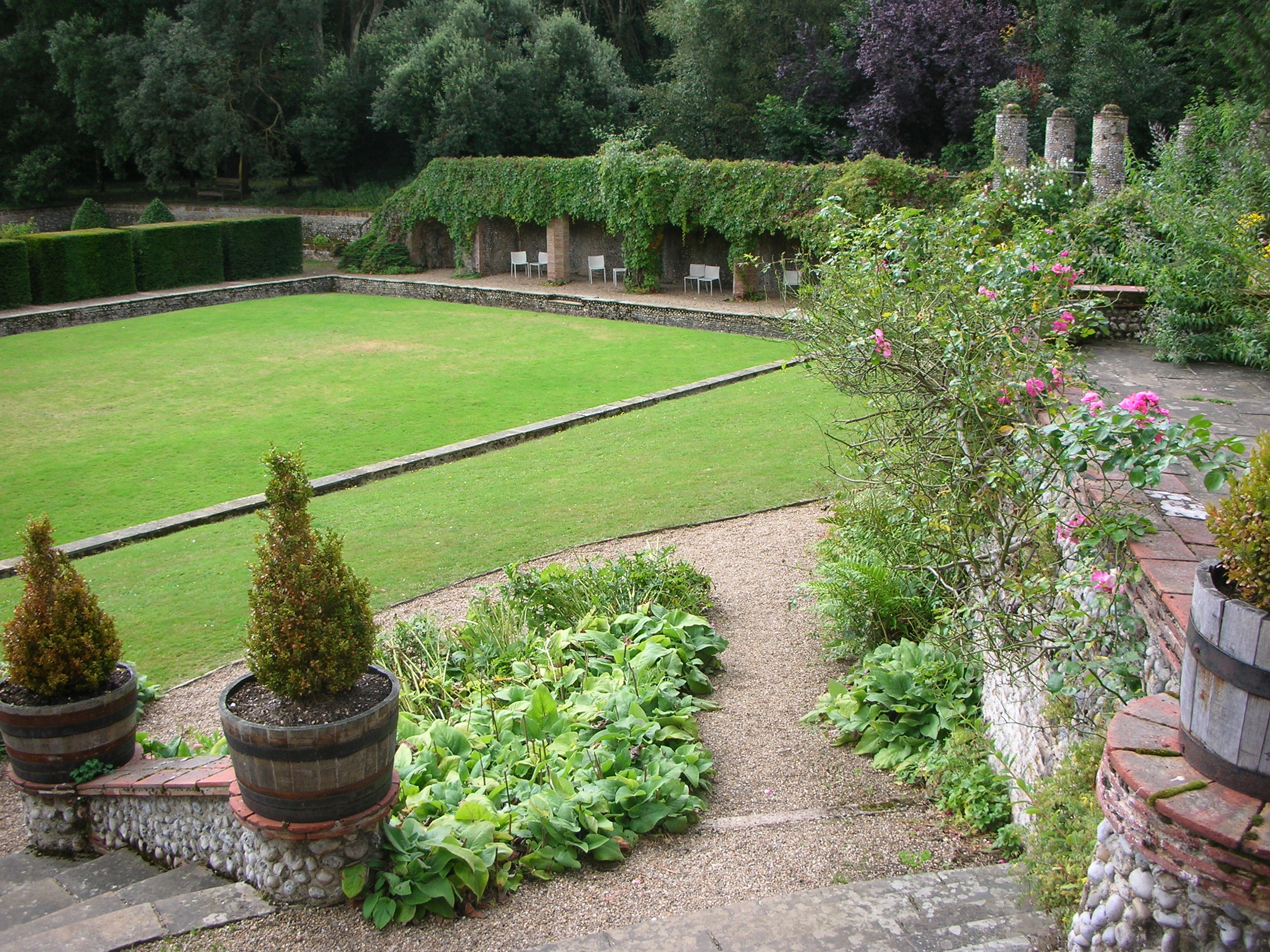

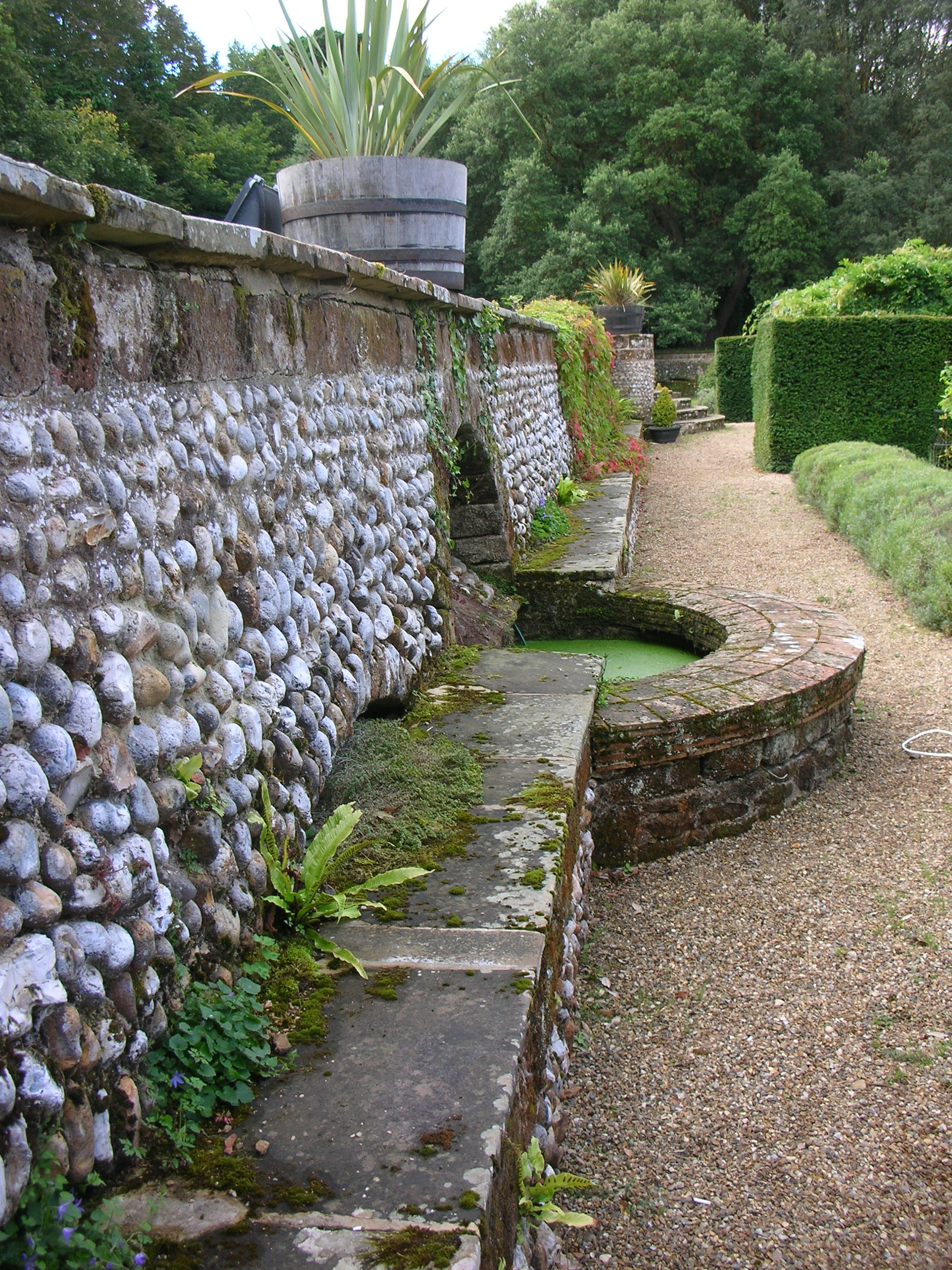

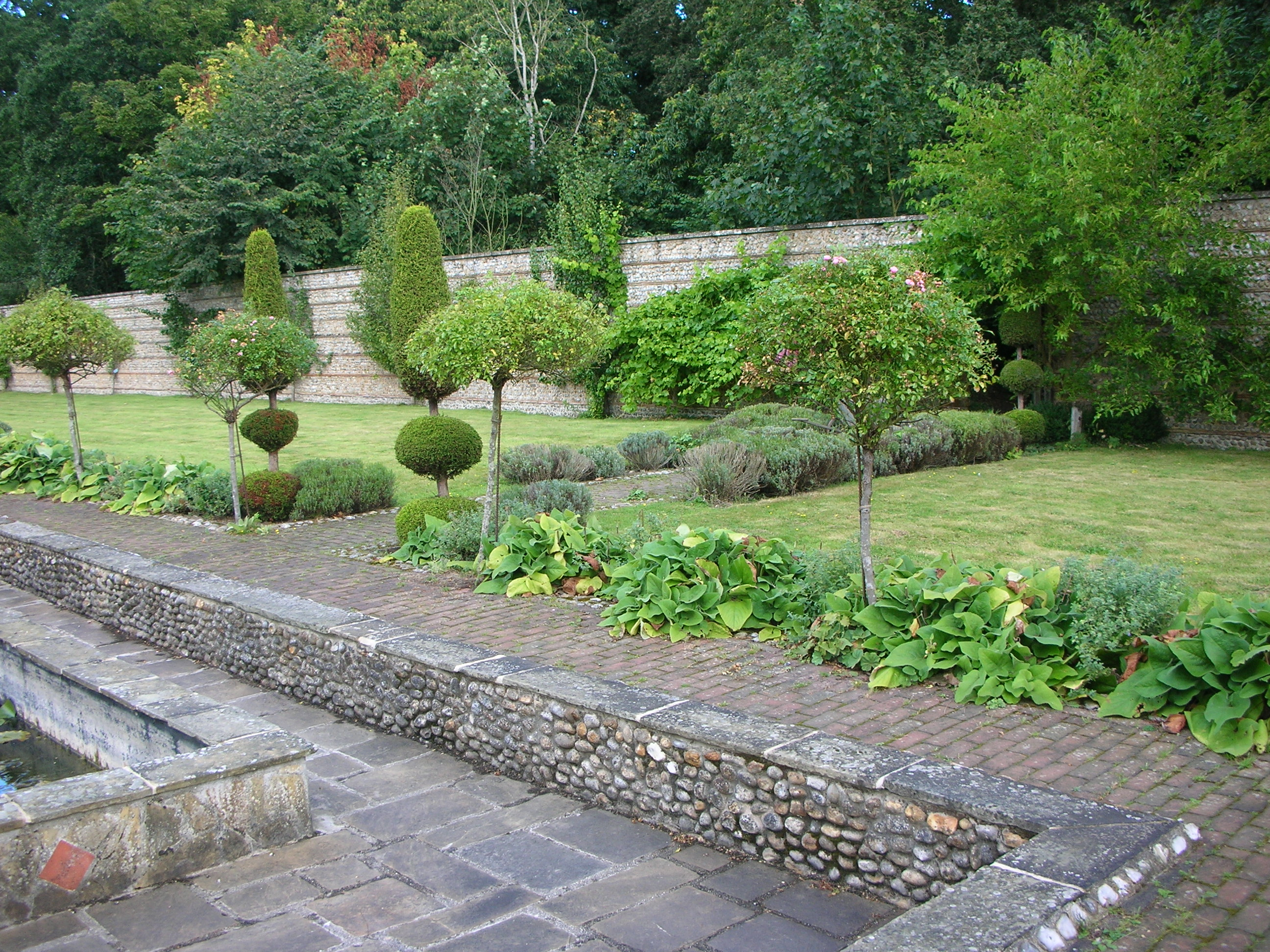

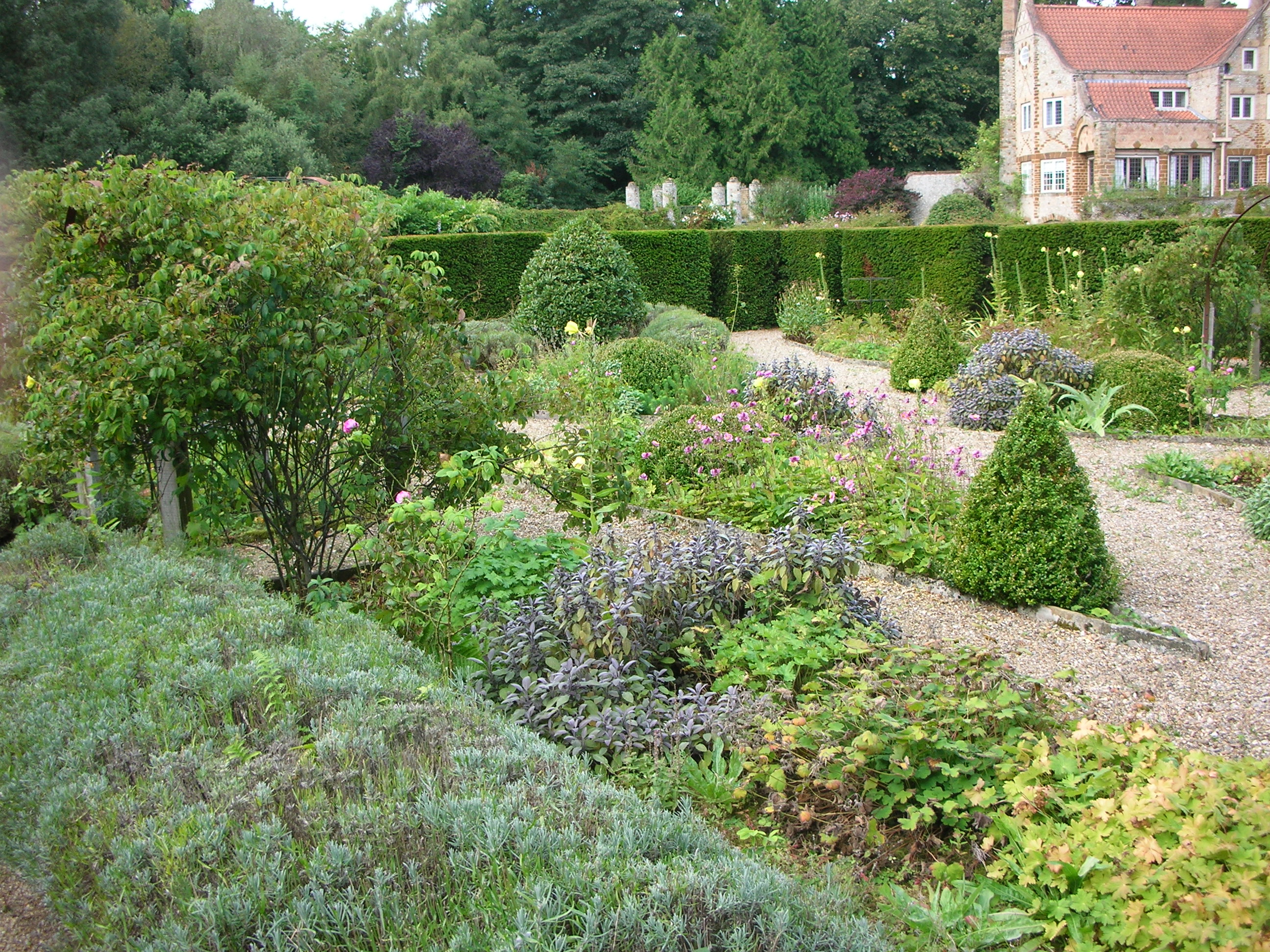

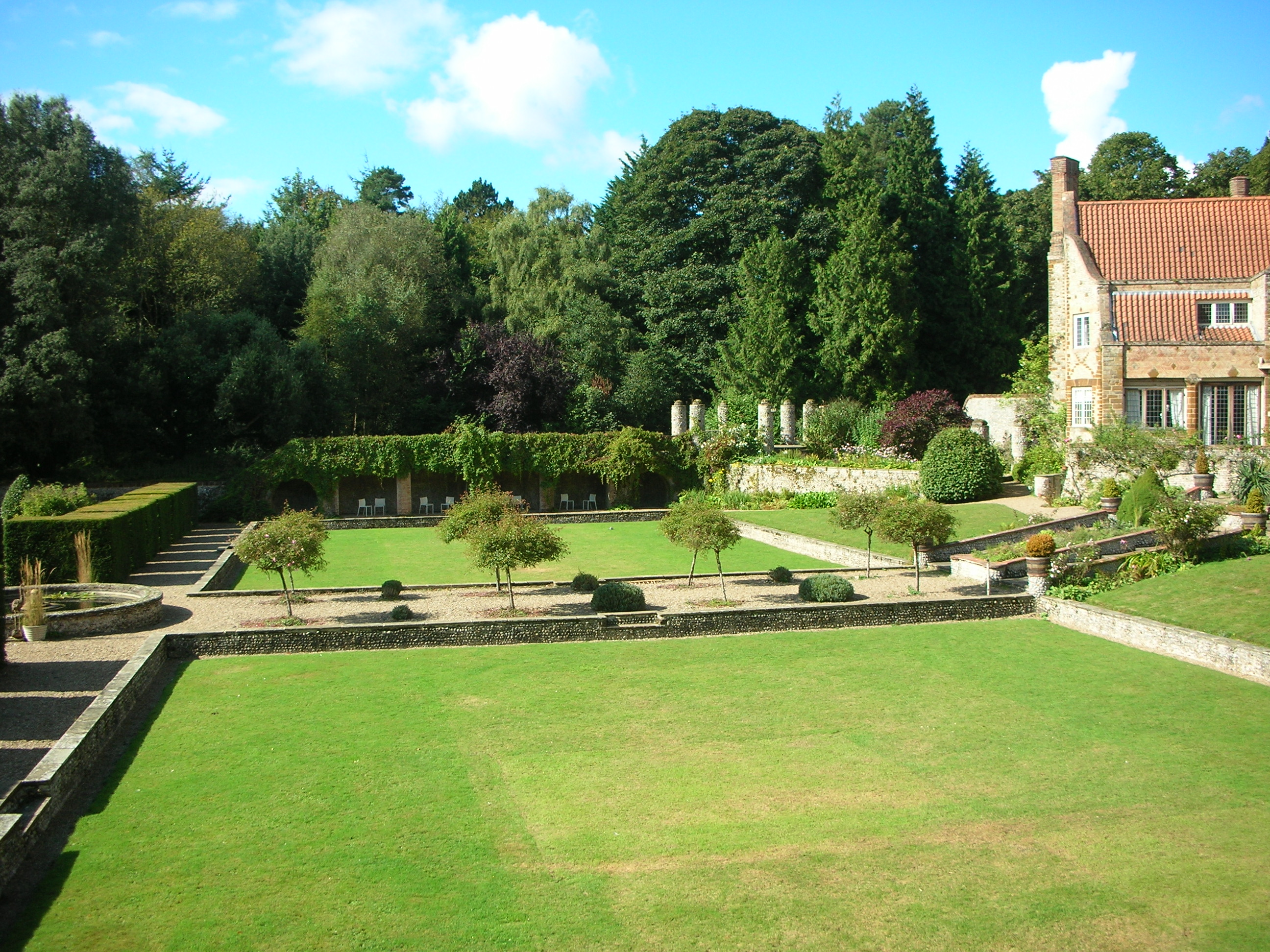

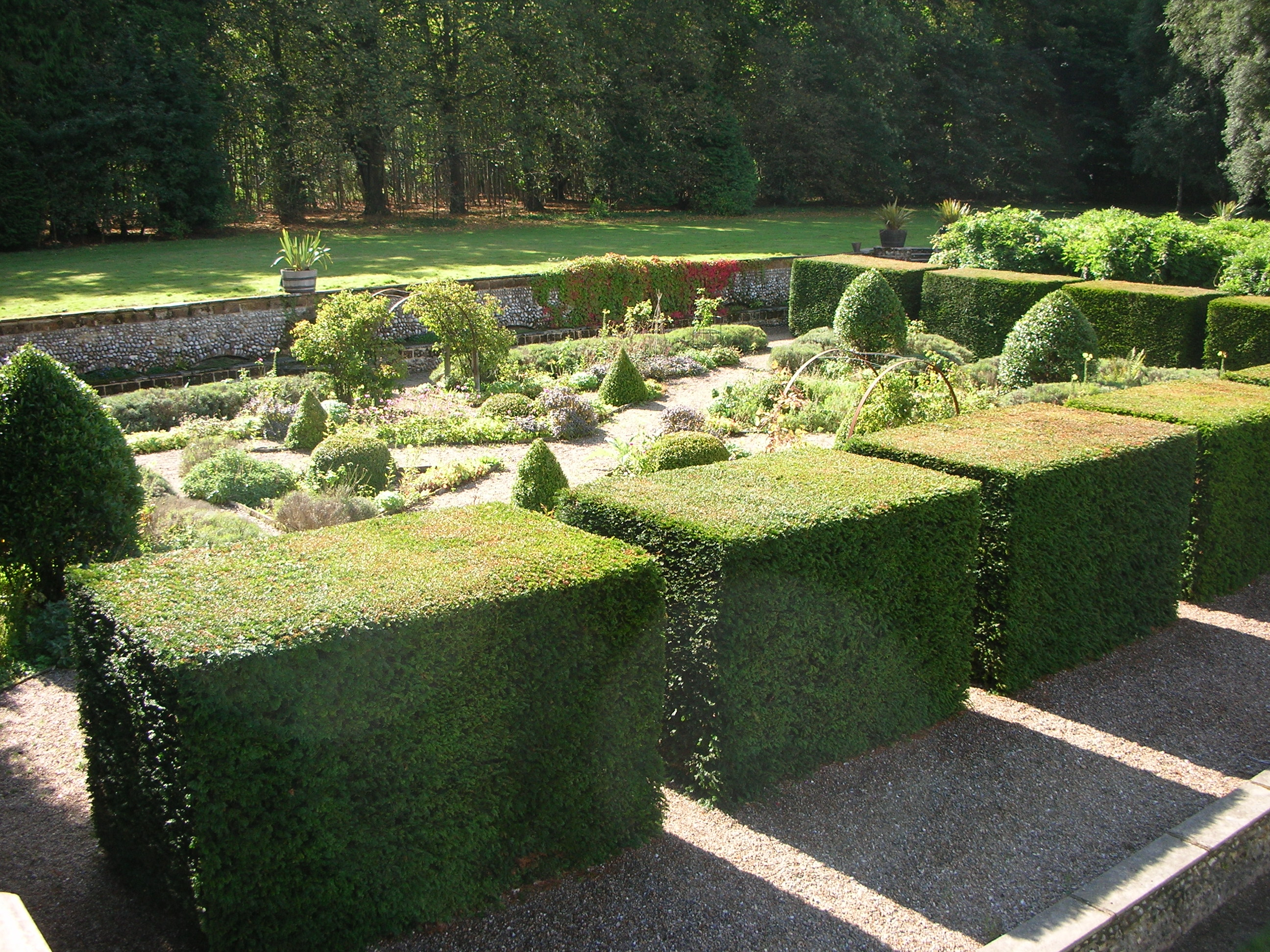

=== Present day ===
The house has undergone a programme of sympathetic restoration and is currently owned by the London bookseller Simon Finch. It is available for wedding receptions, retreats, a location for filming and photography as well as corporate events. Finch has hosted the Voewood Festival a number of times; this is a literary festival for the most part but Glen Matlock and Adam Ant have both performed at it. The rock band Gene Loves Jezebel recorded the album The Thornfield Sessions (2003) there.
