= Edgar Stogdon =

English academic, clergyman, and athlete

Personal information
- Full name: Edgar Stogdon
- Born: 30 July 1870; Harrow, Middlesex, England
- Died: 30 June 1951 (aged 80); Northwood, Middlesex, England
- Batting: Right-handed

Domestic team information
- Years: Team
- 1893: Cambridge University

Career statistics
| Competition | First-class |
|---|---|
| Matches | 2 |
| Runs scored | 19 |
| Batting average | 4.75 |
| 100s/50s | –/– |
| Top score | 12 |
| Catches/stumpings | 1/– |
- Source: Cricinfo, 26 January 2023

Edgar Stogdon (30 July 1870 – 30 June 1951) was an English academic, clergyman, athlete and a cricketer who played in two first-class cricket matches for Cambridge University in 1893. He was born in Harrow, Middlesex and died at Northwood, also in Middlesex.

The eldest son of a schoolmaster at Harrow School, Stogdon was himself educated at Harrow and at Clare College, Cambridge. As a cricketer, he was played as a right-handed lower-order batsman in his two first-class matches for Cambridge University, scoring 7 and 12 in the first game, but failing to score in two innings in the second, after which he was dropped from the team. As an athlete, he won a Blue in both 1892 and 1893 for running the mile.

Stogdon graduated from Cambridge University with a Bachelor of Arts degree in 1892 (though he played cricket for the university the following year) and this converted to a Master of Arts in 1896. He was ordained as a Church of England deacon in 1895 and as a priest in 1896. He was initially a schoolmaster, teaching at Uppingham School from 1895, then serving three years as headmaster of Elstree School from 1900 before returning to Harrow for five years in 1903. From 1908, he went into the church, serving as vicar of Holy Trinity Church, South Kensington's Harrow mission to 1914, then as vicar of Aldenham to 1923, and finally as vicar and rural dean of Harrow to his retirement in 1944.

Stogdon's younger brother John was a more successful cricketer, playing 44 first-class matches for Cambridge University and Middlesex between 1896 and 1909.
