= Edward Schroeder Prior =

British architect

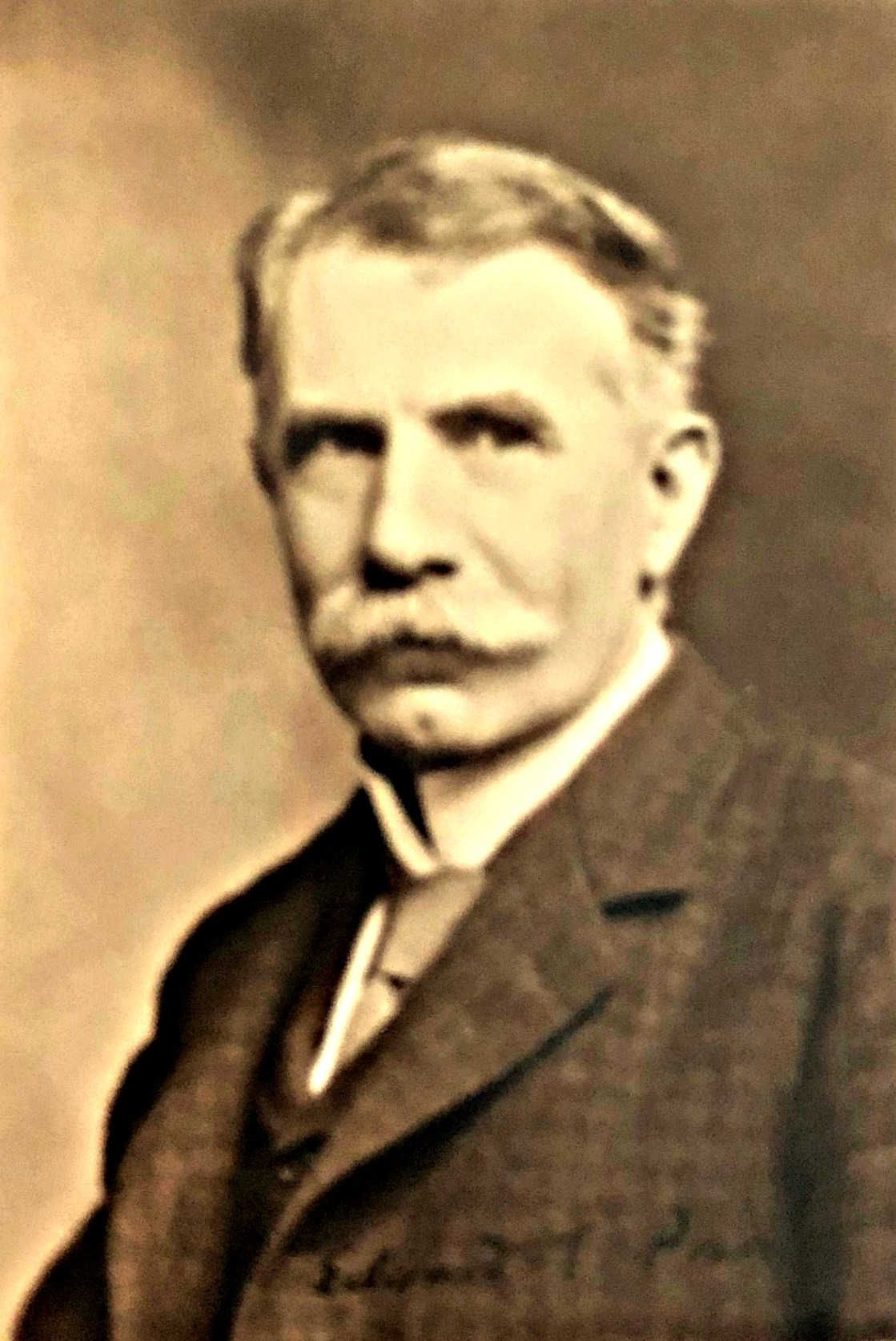
- Prior in 1910
- Born: 4 January 1852; Greenwich, England
- Died: 19 August 1932 (aged 80); Chichester, England
- Education: Cambridge University
- Known for: Architecture, Prior's Early English glass
- Notable work: The Barn, Exmouth; Home Place, Kelling
- Movement: Arts and Crafts Movement

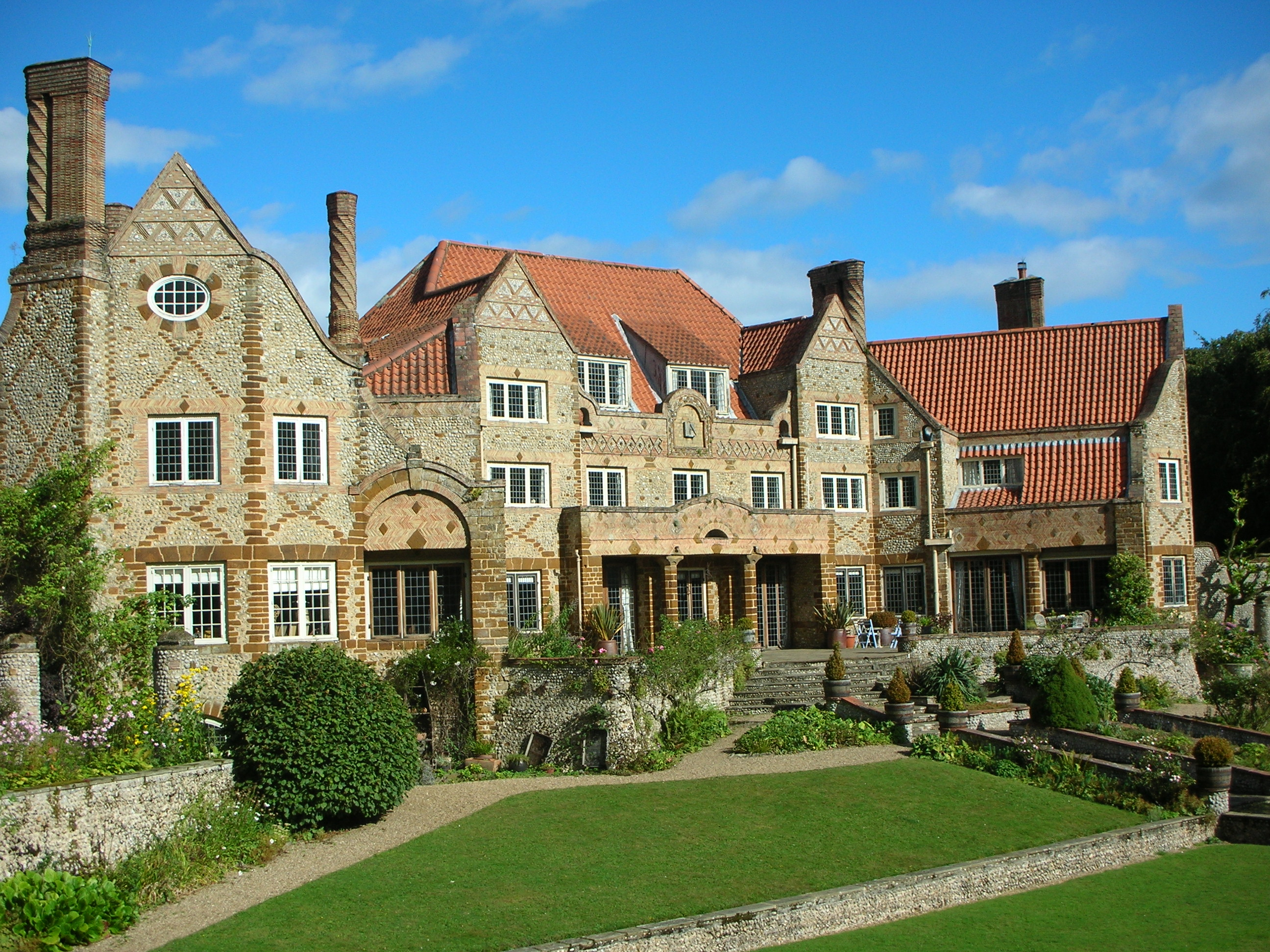
Home Place, Kelling

Edward Schroeder Prior RA (1852–1932) was a British architect, instrumental in establishing the Arts and Crafts movement. He was one of the foremost theorists of the second generation of the movement, writing extensively on architecture, art, craftsmanship and the building process and subsequently influencing the training of many architects.

He was a major contributor to the development of the Art Workers Guild and other organisations that lay at the heart of the movement's attempts to bring art, craftsmanship and architecture closer together. His scholarly work, particularly A History of Gothic Art in England (1900), achieved international acclaim. He became one of the leading architectural educationalists of his generation. As Slade Professor of Fine Art at Cambridge University he established the School of Architectural Studies.

Initially his buildings show the influence of his mentor Norman Shaw and Philip Webb, but Prior experimented with materials, massing and volume from the start of his independent practice. He developed a style that was intensely individual and a practical philosophy of construction that was perhaps nearer to Ruskin's ideal of the "builder designer" than that of any other arts and crafts architect.

The buildings of his maturity, such as The Barn, Exmouth, and Home Place, Kelling are amongst the most original of the period. In St Andrew's Church, Roker, he produced his masterpiece, a church that is now recognised as one of the best of the early 20th century.

== Biography ==
=== Family ===
Edward Schroeder Prior was born in Greenwich on 4 January 1852, his parents' fourth son, one of eleven children. His father John Venn Prior, who was a barrister in the Chancery division, died at the age of 43 as a result of a fall from a horse. Edward was aged 10 at the time. His mother, Hebe Catherine Prior, moved the family from their house in Croom's Hill, Greenwich to Harrow, where Edward's eldest brother John Templer was at school and where local resident families paid reduced fees for day boys. Here, next door to the house of Matthew Arnold, she started a school for children whose parents were in India, and Edward was one of its first pupils.

=== Harrow School ===
In 1863 at the unusually young age of 11, Edward entered Harrow School. Here his interest in natural history, art, architecture and science was fostered, particularly by F. W. Farrar, H. M. Butler and B. F. Westcott, his housemaster and private tutor. (Prior remained a committed naturalist throughout his life. His collections of Lepidoptera remain largely intact, held by the Museum of St Albans.) Prior remained connected to Harrow School and was later to design two buildings for the school.

=== Cambridge University ===
In 1869 Prior won the Sayer Scholarship "for the promotion of classical learning and taste" to Gonville and Caius College, Cambridge to read the Classical Tripos. He augmented the Sayer Scholarship by also gaining a college scholarship. He matriculated in 1870, graduating B.A. in 1874, M.A. in 1877.

In the same year B. F. Westcott was appointed Regius Professor of Divinity. Prior continued to gain from his instruction in architectural drawing at Cambridge. Other influences were Matthew Digby Wyatt and Sidney Colvin, the first and second Slade Professors of Fine Art. Wyatt's lecture programme for 1871 included engraving, woodcutting, stained glass and mosaic. Prior's interest in the applied arts was probably strongly encouraged by Wyatt. Colvin, a friend of Edward Burne-Jones and Dante Gabriel Rossetti, was elected Slade Professor in January 1873.

At Cambridge, Prior was also exposed to the work of William Morris. For example, G. F. Bodley employed Morris & Co. to decorate All Saints Church in 1864–1866 and to design the glass for others of his Cambridge buildings.

Prior was a noted athlete at Cambridge. He was a blue in long jump and high jump and won the British Amateur High Jump in 1872.

=== Norman Shaw's pupil ===
In the autumn of 1874 Prior was articled to Norman Shaw at 30 Argyll Street. Shaw had made his name through country houses such as Cragside, Northumberland. His pupils were articled for three years, learning to measure buildings and to draw plans and elevations for contracts. At the time the practice was still small, with just three rooms shared with William Eden Nesfield. Shaw had a limited number of assistants and pupils, including Ernest Newton (1856–1922), who had joined Shaw in 1873 but who left to set up on his own in 1879, Richard Creed (1846–1914) and William West Neve (1852–1942), who was also soon to set up in practice on his own behalf. The St George's Art Society grew out of the discussions held amongst Shaw's circle at Newton's Hart Street offices. In the late 1870s and early 1880s Shaw's prestige rose with "spectacular perspectives" exhibited at Royal Academy exhibitions. As Chief Draftsman, Newton was probably the major influence on the drawing style, but Prior may have made a contribution.

By 1877, however, Shaw's health was deteriorating. Prior was appointed Clerk of Works for St Margaret's Church, Ilkley, administering the work from November 1877 to August 1879. He was responsible for the contract drawings and possibly for the design of the roof reinforcement and some of the detailing and furniture, such as the font. Prior was eager to gain practical experience of construction, and the craftsmen at Ilkley made a deep impression on him:

He [Prior] went (to Ilkley) and then found that the idea of wonderful construction was all an imposture: there was no science of construction, but there was an experience of construction to be gained by the man who worked with his hands and not the man who made the drawing.

=== Practice and private life ===
Prior only stayed a few more months with Shaw on his return from Ilkley. In 1880 he began his own practice at 17, Southampton Road, near Shaw and others of his former employees; Reginald Blomfield leased an office on the second floor. Prior occupied the building until 1885 and again in 1889–94 and 1901.

His early commissions were primarily located in areas where he had connections, in Harrow and around Bridport in Dorset, where his father had lived and his mother's relatives, the Templers, were prominent inhabitants, and in Cambridge where he had been at university. The opening of the Metropolitan Railway to Harrow in 1880 and his connections with Harrow in particular encouraged Prior to work in the Harrow area.

His work in Dorset was to lead to his marriage. Whilst designing Pier Terrace at West Bay, Prior met Louisa Maunsell, the daughter of the vicar of nearby Symondsbury. They were married in Symondsbury Church on 11 August 1885, Mervyn Macartney being the best man.

The Priors lived in 6 Bloomsbury Square from 1885 to 1889. Here his daughters Laura and Christobel were born. Prior leased Bridgefoot, Iver, Bucks, as a country residence in 1889, but on the birth of his second daughter it was leased to the architect G. F. Bodley.

In 1894 Prior moved to 10 Melina Place, St John's Wood, next door to Voysey, resulting in the development of a long term friendship and exchange of ideas between the two men, to the extent that Voysey is recorded as having painted the roofs of Prior's seminal Model for a Dorsetshire Cottage.

Prior moved to Sussex in 1907 initially living in an early 18th-century house at 7 East Pallant, Chichester. In 1908 he bought an 18th-century house in Mount Lane with an adjacent warehouse which he converted to provide a studio. He continued the London practice at 1 Hare Court, Temple until the middle of the First World War. On his appointment as Slade Professor at Cambridge Prior also bought a house, Fairview in Shaftesbury Road, Cambridge.

After the First World War Prior unsuccessfully tried to restart his practice with H. C. Hughes. He started a commission for a house outside Cambridge but got into a dispute with the client over the materials for the boundary hedge. Hughes took over the job as his own. Prior's scheme for the ciborium at Norwich Cathedral was dropped, a deep disappointment for him.

In the post war years he only undertook the design of war memorials at Maiden Newton in Dorset and for Cambridge University R.U.F.C.

=== The Arts and Craft Guilds ===
Prior played a crucial role in the establishment of the Guilds that were the intellectual focus of the Arts and Crafts Movement. The St George's Art Society, 1883–1886, was founded by a group of architects who had seen service in the Shaw's offices, Ernest Newton, Mervyn Macartney, Reginald Barratt, Edwin Hardy, William Lethaby and Prior, to discuss Art and Architecture. It initially met in Newton's chambers by St George's Church, Bloomsbury. Prior was on the committee. Monthly meetings were held and papers read, Prior speaking on "Terracotta" and "Tombs". Trips were arranged to see buildings.

At the October 1883 meeting it was decided that it would be preferable to found a new organisation that would bring together "craftsmen in Architecture, Painting, Sculpture and the kindred Arts." The proposals stemmed from the members' alarm at the lack of relationship between architects and artists and their dissatisfaction with the Institute of British Architects and the Royal Academy. Prior wrote in November 1883,

Painters, Sculptors, and Architects are in danger of settling permanently into three distinct professions, oblivious of one another's aims. A Society is wanted to restore their former union with one another with a programme of cohesion such as the Royal Academy hardly now suggests, and which the Institute of British Architects has deliberately rejected.

After various consultations invitations were sent out to 24 artists including members of The Fifteen, founded by the designer and writer Lewis Day and the illustrator and designer Walter Crane and others, such as J. D. Sedding, Ernest George and Basil Champneys. Various names for the group were proposed and Prior's suggestion of the "Art Workers Guild" was accepted at the meeting of 11 March 1884. Prior also wrote the Guild's first prospectus.

The Guild was highly influential on the architecture of the Arts and Crafts Movement, but Prior remained only a minor player for some time, until he was elected to the governing committee in 1889. However the contact with other members of the Society certainly encouraged Prior to rationalise and develop his theories. He was also able to call on the skills of a wide range of craft practitioners from the Guild for the design and construction of furniture for many of his buildings. Prior became Master in 1906.

Prior was also active in various other organisations of the time, including the Arts and Crafts Exhibition Society of 1886, set up to combat the exclusiveness of the Royal Academy, and the National Association for the Advancement of Art and its Application to Industry of 1888, at which he gave his inspired lecture on "Texture as a Quality of Art and a Condition for Architecture" that set out the rationale behind his most significant buildings. His involvement with the Clergy and Artists' Association of 1896, set up to improve the links between patron and producer, led directly to commissions for example for the lych gate at Methley Church.

=== Scholarship ===
During the late 1890s Prior's practice received few commissions. The study of Gothic art and architecture became one of Prior's major concerns the period. In 1900 he published A History of Gothic Art in England, which as rapidly recognised as a standard text. This was followed by The Cathedral Builders in England in 1905, An Account of English Medieval Figure-Sculpture in 1912, which provided an exhaustive account of figurative sculpture from the 7th –to the 16th Century for the first time.

A History of Gothic Art in England made Prior's scholastic reputation and contributed to his appointment as Slade Professor of Fine Art at Cambridge University in 1905.

=== Stained glass ===
In 1889 he developed Prior's glass, also known as Prior's Early English glass, a slab glass which is similar to the "luminosity and varied colouring of early medieval glass."

It was made by blowing glass into a rectilinear box and then cutting off the sides. This yielded flat panes of uneven thickness, often streaked with colour. Whereas the prevailing style of glass relied on meticulous draughtsmanship and line control to create rich backgrounds of flat surface decoration such as gothic mouldings or foliage, the new glass could be used to create backgrounds with a more abstract pattern, as in the St Pancras roll of honour, or combined with lead alone to create bold and dramatic effects such as the wings of the four archangels at St Andrew's, Chippenham.

== Education ==
Prior first became involved in architectural education during the debate over the professionalisation of architectural practice in the 1890s. The protest against examination and registration was launched by the Art Workers Guild, whose members believed, quite correctly, that RIBA wished to establish itself as the sole arbiter of the profession culminating in the publication of a collection of essays Architecture: A Profession or an Art in 1892, to which Prior contributed a chapter criticising the common use of "hirelings" to do the architect's work. In the same year Prior resigned from the RIBA, amongst others.

As a result of the controversy members of the Guild became very interested in architectural education. The Architectural Association established a School of Handicraft and Design to extend its training scheme. It had been criticised for being too geared to the RIBA's examination system. Prior was one of the architect-visitors who drew up projects and gave the "crits".

He became increasingly interested in education, giving lectures at various conferences, to the RIBA and schools of design. Moves were instigated to establish a School of Architecture at Cambridge in 1907. The syndicate seeking the establishment of the school included Prior's old headmaster Dr H.M. Butler, who was by then Dean of Trinity College, Charles Waldstein, Slade Professor of Fine Art and William Ridgeway the Disney Professor of Archaeology. The establishment of examinations were approved in 1908. Waldstein favoured Prior as his successor. Prior was elected Slade Professor on 20 February 1912 with the role of developing the new School of Architecture. In 1915 the tenure of the Professorship was extended to life.

Prior established the syllabus for the School, oversaw the establishment of the Department and instigated a research programme. The latter included experimental studies into the performance of limes and cements.

== Works ==
The lych gate (1890) at Kelsale parish church

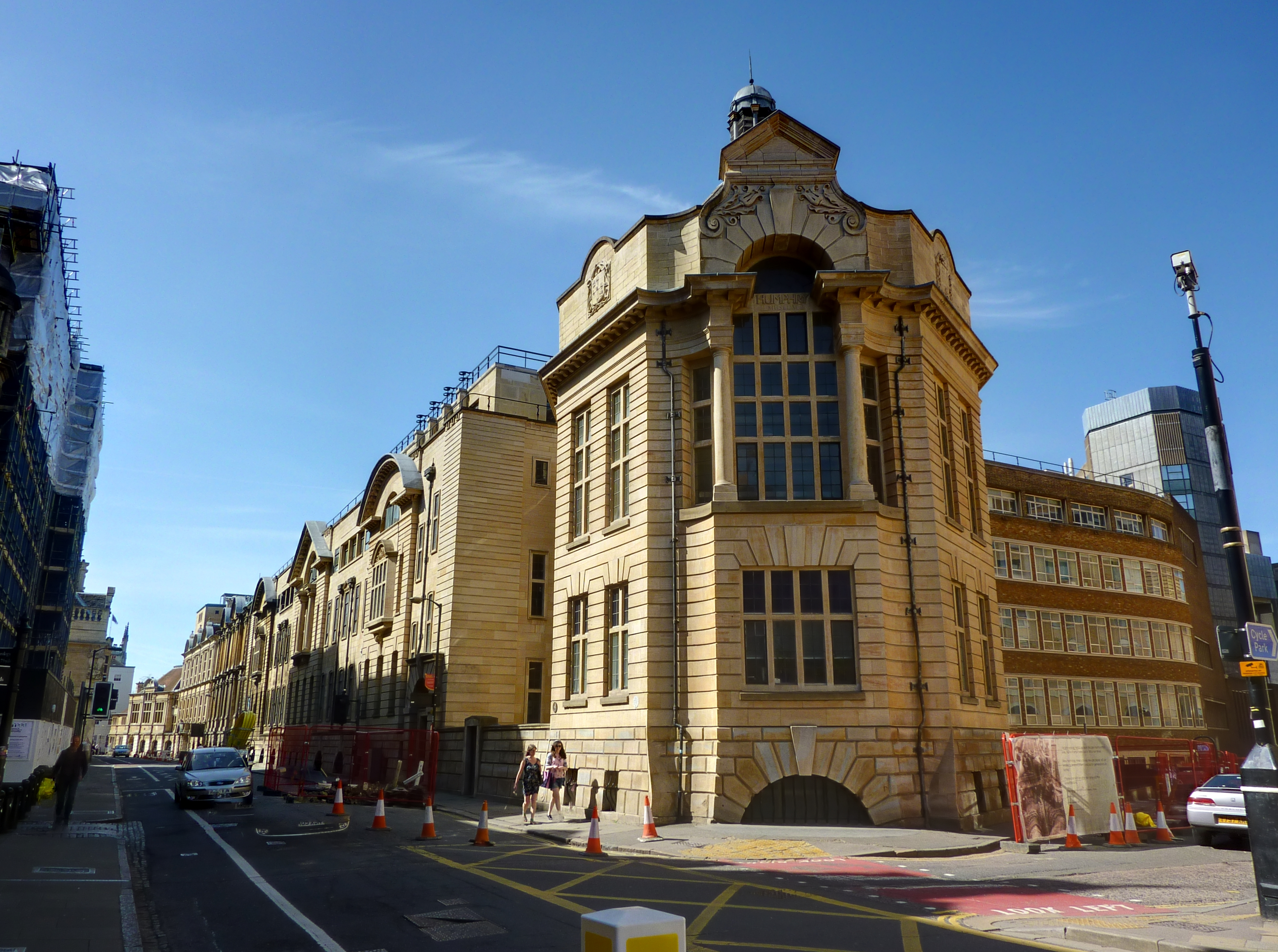
Cambridge Medical School

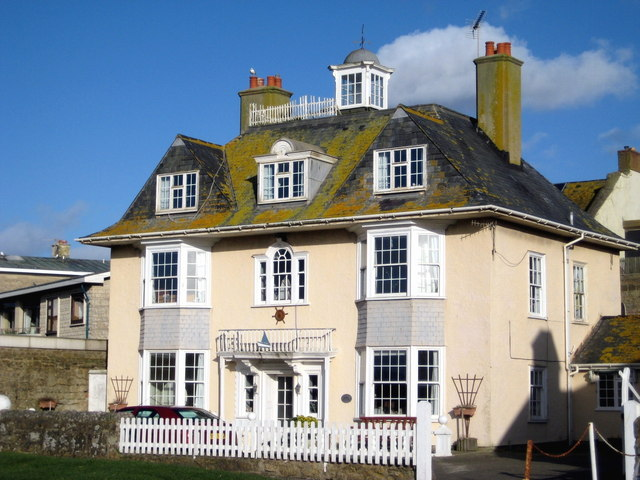
The Moorings, West Bay, Bridport

=== Early buildings 1880–1894 ===
Date	Building	Location
1880	Carr Manor	Meanwood, Leeds
1880–1881	Highgrove House	Eastcote
1881–1882 & 1889–1891	St Mary and St Peter	Kelsale, Suffolk
1883–1884	The Red House	Middlesex
1883–1884	St Mary's Mission Hall, West Street	Harrow
1883–1884	Manor Lodge	Harrow
1884–1885	Quay Terrace, West Bay	West Bay, Dorset
1884–1889	Holy Trinity Church, Bothenhampton	Bridport
1885–1887	Henry Martyn Hall	Cambridge
1885–1889	Church of St Michael the Archangel	Framlingham, Suffolk
1885	Elmside	Grange Road, Cambridge
1886–1887	Woolaston Road houses	Cambridge
1887	Middle Terrace	Harrow
1887–1889	Harrow School Laundry, Superintendent's House and Worker's Dining Hall	Middlesex
1888	Herschel Lodge, Herschel Road	Cambridge
1889	Billiard Room, Mount Park Road	Harrow
1890	Harrow School Music Room	Middlesex
1891–1892 & 1895–1896	Pembroke College Mission	Walworth, London
1891	Kelsale Village Club	Suffolk
1893	Downe Hall	Bridport
1899–1901	Prior Hall	Walworth

=== Later works ===
Date	Building	Location
c. 1894	Club, Promenade and Baths at West Bay	Dorset
1895	Model of a Butterfly Cottage	
1896–1897	The Barn	Exmouth, Devon
1895–1897	St Mary's Church, Burton Bradstock	Dorset
1897–1900	All Saints' Vicarage	Westbrook, Kent
1899	Cambridge Medical School	University of Cambridge
1901–1904	Winchester College Music School	Hampshire
1903–1905	Home Place, Kelling	near Holt, Norfolk
1905–1907	St Andrew's Church, Roker	Sunderland
1907–1909	St Mary & All Saints	Whalley, Lancashire
	Combelands, Pulborough	Sussex
	The Small House, Lavant	Sussex
1909	Dysart House	Cambridge
1910	The Oaks, Goudhurst	Kent
1911	Windacres, Warren Road, Guildford	Surrey
1911–1914	Greystones & Greystone Lodge, Highcliffe	Dorset
1911–1914	Mount Joy, Highcliffe (Demolished but photograph available)	Dorset
1913–1916	Church of St Osmund	Parkstone

== Final years ==
Prior remained as Slade Professor until his death from cancer on 19 August 1932. He spent his final year writing letters about architectural education. He was buried in an unmarked grave at St Mary's Church, Apuldram. Few of his friends remained, Lethaby, Newton, and Horsley were all dead, and none of his former architectural colleagues attended his funeral.

His obituary in the Architect and Building News perhaps best summed him up:

And he could be something of a grizzly old bear at times, for he was pertinacious and his opinion once formed was hardly to be changed. To hear an argument – and we have heard several – between Prior and Leonard Stokes was an education. Yet it was a kindly bear withal, that would emerge, honours divided, from a wordy warfare with a joyous twinkle in its eye; and for any small personal attention or service, it could be immensely grateful and appreciative.

== Prior's writings ==
- Architecture; a Profession or an Art, Jackson, T.G. and Shaw, N
- Cathedral Builders in England, Prior, E.S., 1905
- An Account of Medieval Figure-Sculpture in England, Prior, E.S. and Gardner, Arthur, 1912
- A History of Gothic Art, Prior, E.S., Geo Bell & Sons, London, 1900
- The Origins of the Guild; Lecture to the Guild, 1895, in Masse, H.J.L.J., The Art Workers Guild 1884–1934, Oxford, 1935 p 11.
- Church Building as it is and as it Might Be, The Architectural Review, Vol. IV 1898
- The Architectural Review, Prior, E.S., The Decoration of St Paul's, 1899, vol. 6, p. 43
- The New Cathedral for Liverpool, The Architectural Review, Oct 1901, vol. 10.

== Bibliography ==
- Cook, Martin Godfrey, Edward Prior: Arts and Crafts Architect, 2015
- Davidson, T.R., Modern Homes, 1909
- Davidson, T.R. (ed), The Arts Connected with Building, 1909
- Fellows, R., Edwardian Style and Technology, Lund Humphries, 1995
- Franklin, J, Edwardian Butterfly House, 1975 pp 220–225
- Grillet, C, Edward Prior, in Edwardian Architecture and Its Origins, ed Service A., The Architectural Press Ltd, 1975, pp. 143–151
- Hoare, G, and Pyne, G. Prior's Barn and Gimson's Coxen, 1978.
- Muthesius, Hermann, Das Englishe Haus, vol. II, 1904
- Naylor, G, The Arts and Crafts Movement, 1971
- Saint, A., Richard Norman Shaw, pp165–171
- Service, A., Edwardian Architecture and Its Origins, The Architectural Press Ltd, 1977
- Sparke, P. et al., Design Source Book, Macdonald Orbis, 1986.
- Valinsky, David, An Architect Speaks: The Writings and Buildings of E. S. Prior, 2014
- Walker, Lynne, E.S. Prior 1852–1932, PhD thesis, Birkbeck College, London University, 1978
- Weaver, Lawrence, Small Country Houses Their Repair and Enlargement, 1914
- Weaver, Lawrence, The Small Country Houses of Today, 1919

=== Periodicals ===
The Architect

- 24 May 1889, vol. 42, p. 299
- 19 July 1889, vol. 42, p. 35, Manor Lodge Harrow
- 2 May 1890, vol. 43, p. 277, Carr Manor, Meanwood Leeds
- 5 September 1890, vol. 44, p. 141
- 3 October 1890, vol. 44, p. 205
- 30 January 1891, vol. 45, p. 71

Architectural Review

- 1897, vol. 2, pp. 246 & 253
- 1898, vol. 4, pp. 106–108, 154–158
- 1898, vol. 5, pp. 132–134
- 1899, vol. 6, pp. 42–44
- 1900, vol. 7, p. 202
- 1900, vol. 10, p. 79
- 1901, vol. 9, p. 256
- 1901, vol. 10, p. 145
- Feb 1906, vol. 19, pp. 70–82
- Jan 1924, vol. 55, pp. 30–1
- 1952, vol 112, pp. 302–308

British Architect

- 4 September 1885, vol. 24, p. 106
- 17 May 1895, vol. 43, pp. 348–9
- 21 December 1900, vol. 54, p. 452
- 5 May 1899, vol. 51, p. 307

The Builder

- Vol XCIII, 23 November 1907, Randall Wells, p563

Building

- 14 June 1884, vol. 46, pp. 866–7
- 25 October 1890, vol. 59, p. 328
- 5 December 1896, vol. 71, p. 470
- 12 October 1907, vol. 93, p. 386

Builders Journal

- 4 June 1895, vol. 1, p. 259

Building News

- 21 July 1882, vol. 43, p. 81
- 8 December 1882, vol. 43, p. 700, High Grove Harrow

Northern Architect

- Vol XVII, 1979, pp. 19–24, Walkew, A., The Church of St Andrew Roker.

The Studio

- 1901, vol 21, part I, pp. 28–36, part II, pp. 86–90, 93–5, part III, pp. 176, 180–86 189–90
