= South Lynn railway station =

Former railway station in Norfolk, England

Coordinates: 52.7357°N 0.3934°E

South Lynn
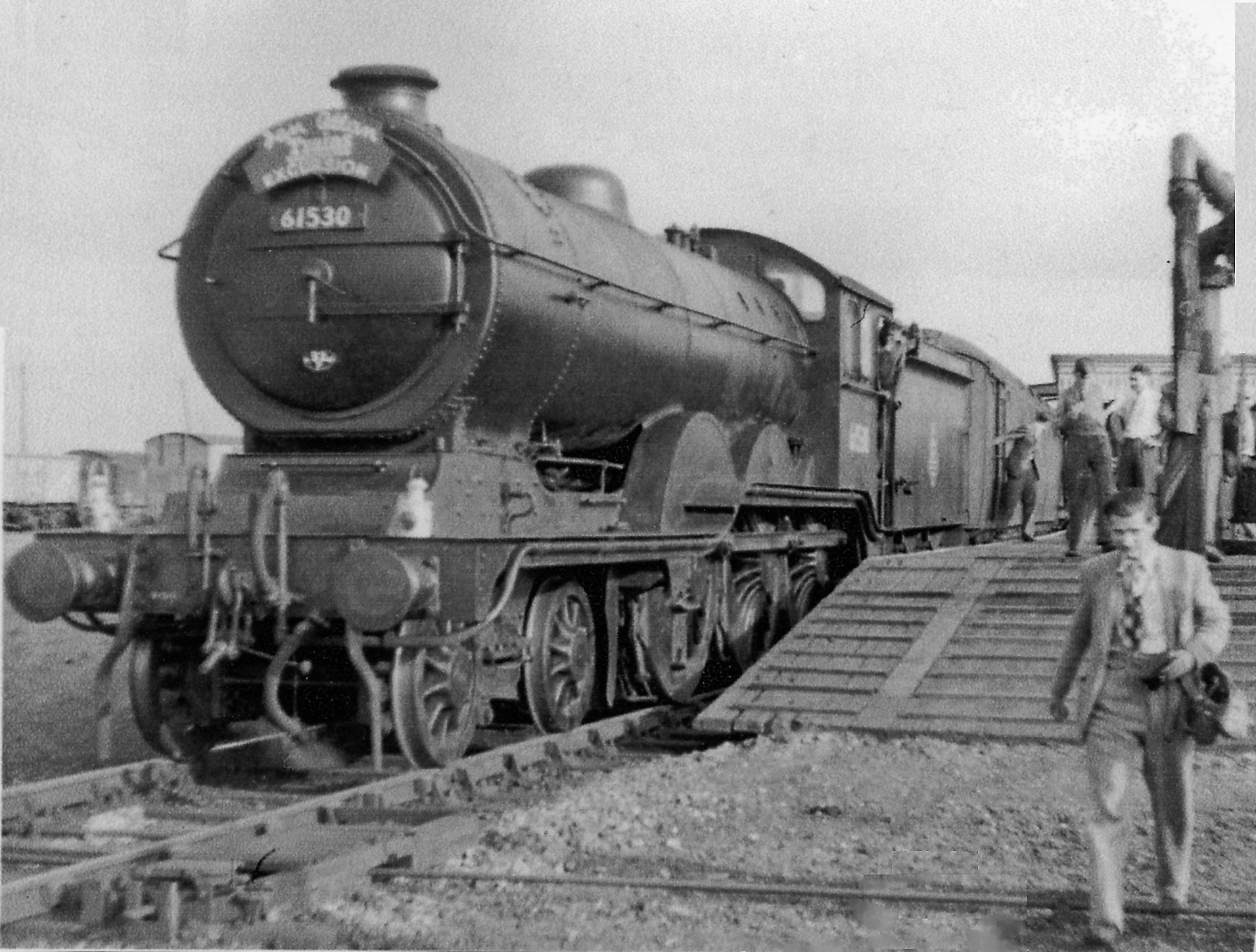
- LNER Class B12/3 No. 61530 at South Lynn in 1954.

General information
- Location: South Lynn; King's Lynn and West Norfolk; England
- Grid reference: TF617180
- Platforms: 2

Other information
- Status: Disused

History
- Original company: Eastern & Midlands Railway
- Pre-grouping: Midland and Great Northern Joint Railway
- Post-grouping: Midland and Great Northern Joint Railway; Eastern Region of British Railways

Key dates
- 1 January 1886: Opened
- 2 March 1959: Closed to passengers
- 2 May 1966: Closed as a coal depot
Location

South Lynn railway station was a railway station serving the areas of South Lynn and West Lynn in King's Lynn in Norfolk, England. The station was on the Midland and Great Northern Joint Railway.

== History ==
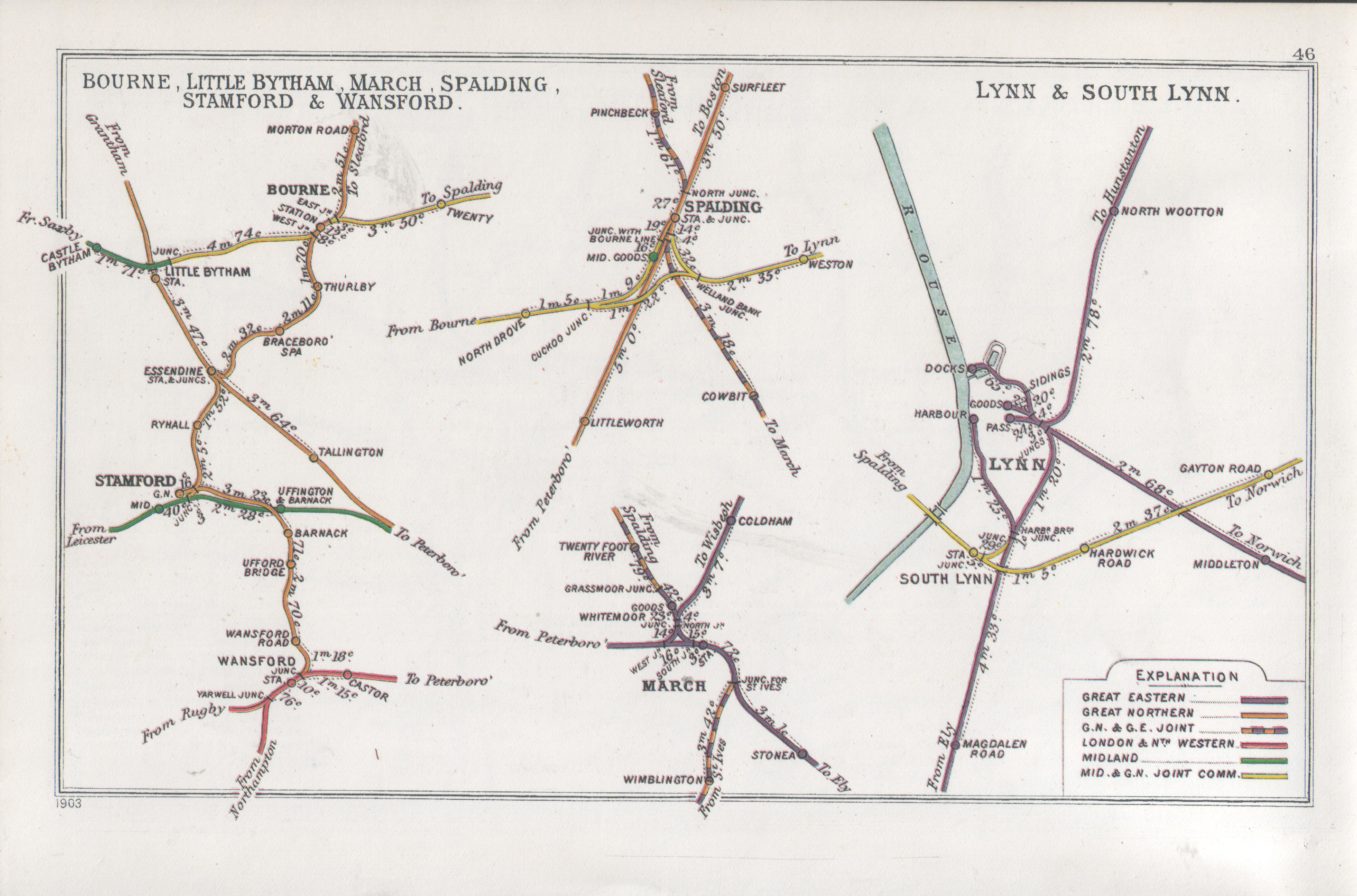
A 1903 Railway Clearing House map of railways in the vicinity of South Lynn (right)

The Lynn & Sutton Bridge Railway was authorised on 6 August 1861, to build a line between those points. It was opened between King's Lynn and Sutton Bridge in November 1864; passenger trains began on 1 March 1866. The first station after King's Lynn was West Lynn, which was located at the western end of the bridge over the Great Ouse; that station was closed on 1 July 1886. The station at South Lynn was opened on 1 January 1886 along with other improvements in the area.

South Lynn station was closed to passengers on 2 March 1959. It was located at the southern end of King's Lynn, and saw far less traffic than King's Lynn railway station.

== Routes ==
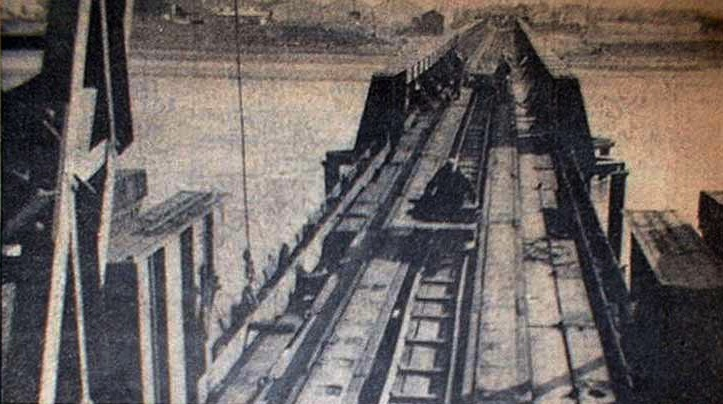
The former railway bridge over the River Great Ouse in 1888. The current A47 road bridge replaced the railway bridge post-closure.

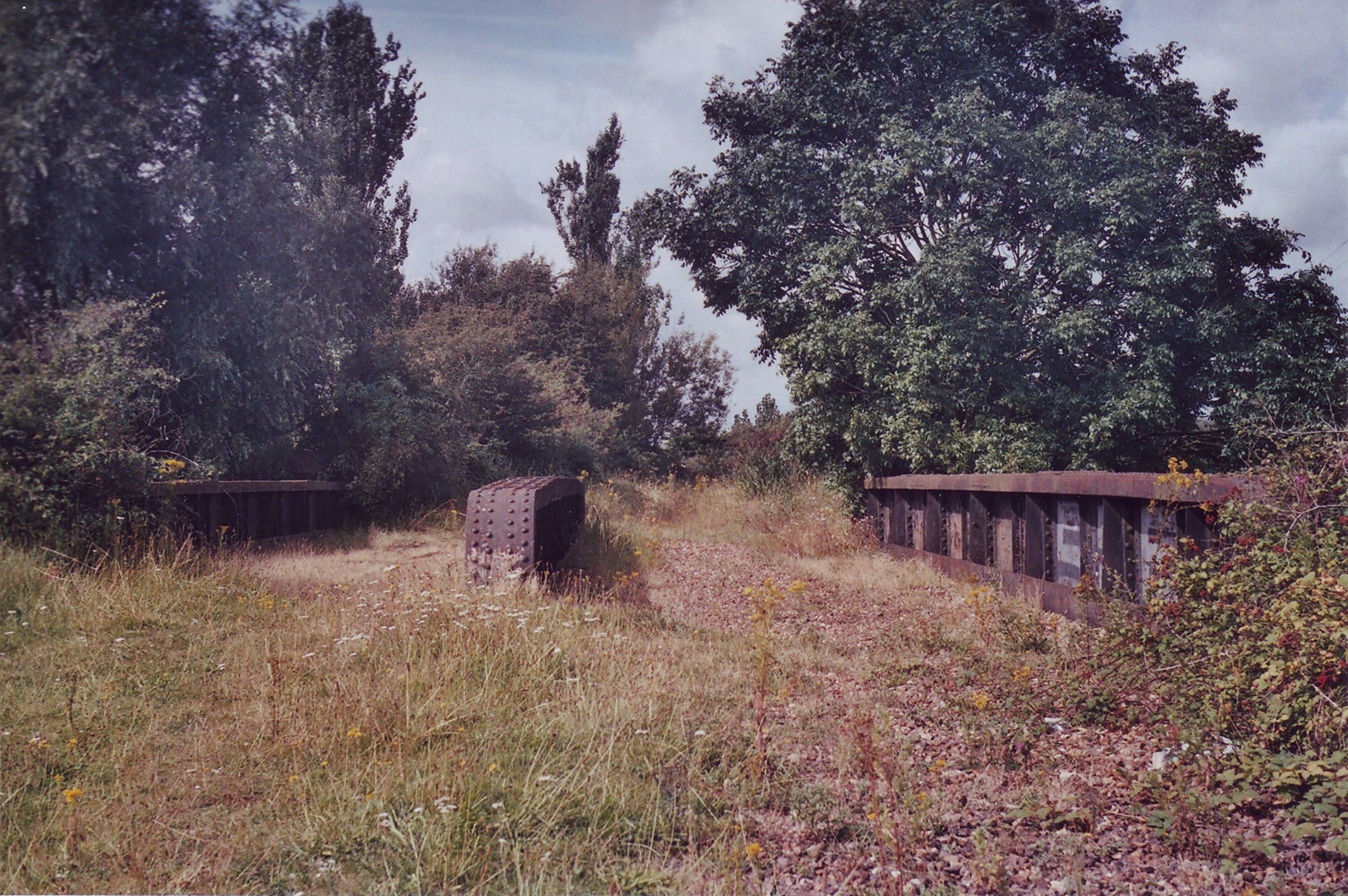
A disused railway bridge over the River Nar at South Lynn, pictured in 2006, abandoned and overgrown.

Preceding station	Disused railways	Following station
Clenchwarton; Line and station closed	Midland and Great Northern	Gayton Road; Line and station closed
Terminus	Midland and Great Northern	King's Lynn; Line closed, station open

== See also ==
- King's Lynn railway station
- List of closed railway stations in Norfolk
- Railways in Norfolk
