= West Lynn railway station =

Disused railway station in West Lynn, Norfolk

West Lynn

General information
- Location: West Lynn, Norfolk; England
- Coordinates: 52.739°N 0.3801°E
- Grid reference: TF607183

Other information
- Status: Disused

History
- Original company: Lynn and Sutton Bridge Railway
- Pre-grouping: Lynn and Sutton Bridge Railway

Key dates
- 1 March 1866: Opened
- 1 July 1886: Closed
Location

West Lynn railway station served the area of West Lynn, Norfolk, England, from 1866 to 1886 on the Lynn and Sutton Bridge Railway.

== History ==
The station was opened on 1 March 1866 by the Lynn and Sutton Bridge Railway. It closed on 1 July 1886.

Preceding station	Disused railways	Following station
Clenchwarton; Line and station closed	Lynn and Sutton Bridge Railway	Terminus
