= South Lynn =

Area of King's Lynn

Coordinates: 52.739220°N 0.395703°E

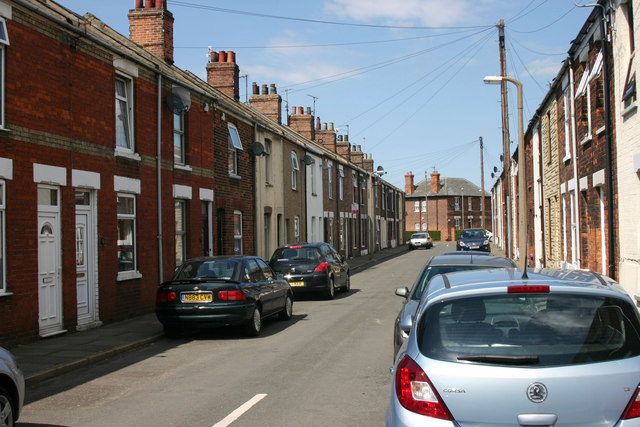

- Location within Norfolk
- Population: (2007)
  - London: 100 miles (161 km)
- District: King's Lynn and West Norfolk
- Shire county: Norfolk
- Region: East
- Country: England
- Sovereign state: United Kingdom
- Post town: KING'S LYNN
- Postcode district: PE30-PE34
- Dialling code: 01553
- Police: Norfolk
- Fire: Norfolk
- Ambulance: East of England
- UK Parliament: North West Norfolk
- Website: www.west-norfolk.gov.uk

South Lynn is an area of King's Lynn, in the King's Lynn and West Norfolk district, in the county of Norfolk, England. It is located directly south of the town, near the A47 and A418 roads.

== History ==
South Lynn was historically known as "Old South Lynn" and had a manor that was owned before 1066 by King Harold. When travellers visited the area, to access Bishop's Lynn, they would have to gain access via Friar Street and All Saints Church. Traffic inbound to the area would have to use the south gate at South Lynn. Due to it lacking a community, a market, or any major important centre, South Lynn was merged into King's Lynn in 1555 and since then, has formed a major part of the southern part of the town. The area is a parish of King's Lynn and is directly southeast of West Lynn which is separated from the area by the Great River Ouse and the area is also separated from King's Lynn to the north by a small part of the River Nar. The civil parish was abolished on 1 April 1935 to form Kings Lynn. In 1931 the parish had a population of 7610.

== Landmarks ==
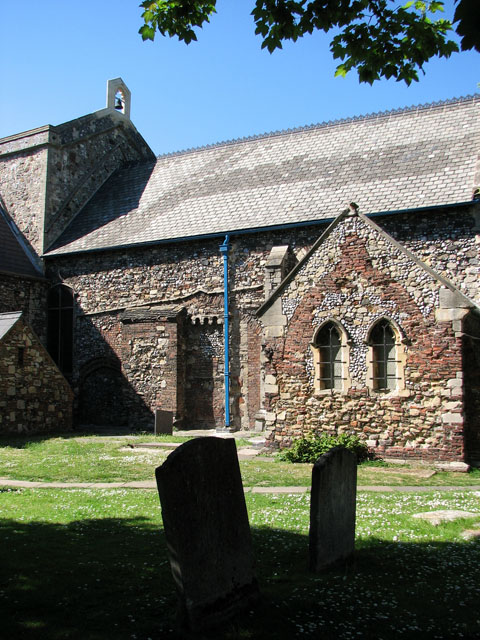
All Saints Church, South Lynn

All Saints Church is the main church of the area as well as nearby King's Lynn Minster in the main town centre. It is the oldest church in King's Lynn, dating from the 11th century, but was rebuilt in the 14th and 15th centuries; the tower collapsed in 1763. It is grade II* listed.

== Transport ==
The area is served by bus routes 46, 47 and X46, which provide services to King's Lynn, Downham Market and Wisbech; the routes are operated by Lynx or Go To Town (West Norfolk Community Transport Project).

South Lynn's nearest railway stations are King's Lynn and Watlington; both stations are on the Fen line, providing regular services to Ely, Cambridge and London King's Cross.

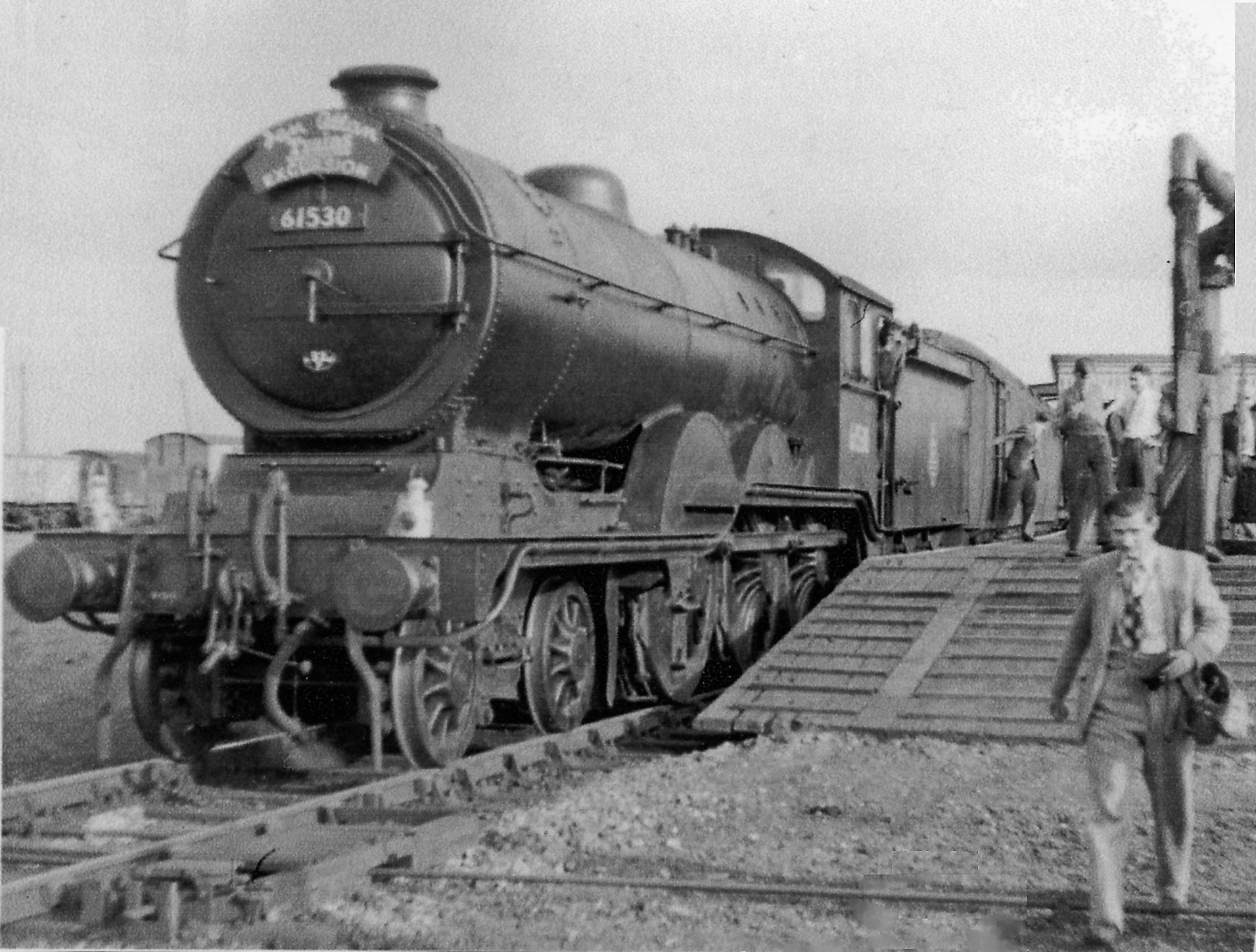
The former South Lynn railway station with a railtour service

The area was served by South Lynn railway station, which was on the Midland & Great Northern Joint Railway from Saxby to Yarmouth Beach, Norwich City and Cromer. There was a short spur to connect the line to the nearby King's Lynn railway station. The station opened in 1886 and closed in 1959.
