= Cromer line =

Railway branch line in Norfolk, England

The Cromer line was a railway branch in Norfolk, England that connected the railway junction of Melton Constable with Cromer on the sea.

== Opening ==
It was first opened in 1887, as part of the rapidly expanding Midland and Great Northern Joint Railway.

== Closure ==
It closed to passengers in April 1964, and to goods trains later that year.

Following closure of the line between Melton Constable and Sheringham, the station buildings at Holt were demolished and part of the trackbed subsequently reused to construct part of the A148 Holt bypass. In 1965, a company known as Central Norfolk Enterprises (which changed its name to the North Norfolk Railway (NNR)) had attempted to purchase the trackbed, but were rebuffed by Norfolk County Council who wished to proceed with the road scheme. The NNR did manage to restore the line between Sheringham and Weybourne.

== The route today ==
Part of the route now forms part of the preserved North Norfolk Railway.

== Potential Future use ==
The proposed Norfolk Orbital Railway could see Holt with a regular railway service again. It would link together Sheringham and Wymondham using the existing lines of the NNR and the Mid Norfolk Railway and laying some fresh connecting track on old track-beds.

The project is facilitated by the fact that reinstatement through Holt remains technically possible as the A148 bypass was built so as to leave sufficient width to enable a single-track railway line to be constructed alongside it. The scheme therefore proposes a new route running from the NNR's Holt station, crossing the A148 on the level before running alongside the road to the site of the original Holt station where a very basic station would be provided. From there it would continue in a cutting running beneath Station Road and Norwich Road before rejoining the line's original alignment to reach Melton Constable.
