= Hillington railway station =

Former railway station in Norfolk, England

Coordinates: 52°47′57″N 0°33′7″E

Hillington
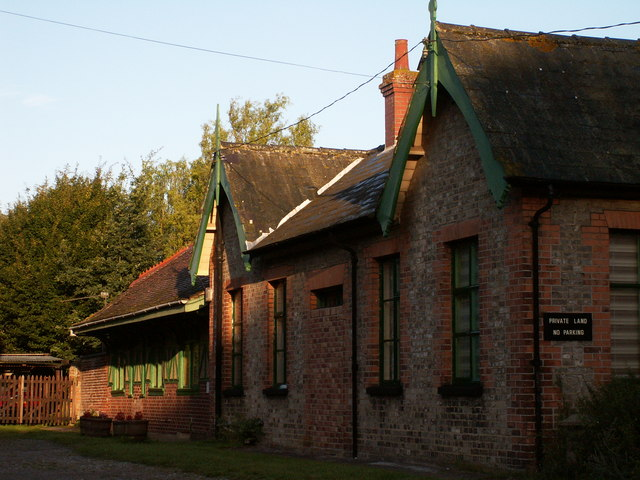
- Hillington Station in 2005

General information
- Location: Hillington, King's Lynn and West Norfolk, Norfolk; England
- Grid reference: TF720253
- Platforms: 2

Other information
- Status: Disused

History
- Pre-grouping: Lynn and Fakenham Railway; Midland and Great Northern Joint Railway
- Post-grouping: Midland and Great Northern Joint Railway; Eastern Region of British Railways

Key dates
- 16 August 1879: Opened
- 2 March 1959: Closed to passengers
- 19 April 1965: Closed to freight
Location

Hillington railway station was a station in Hillington, Norfolk on the now closed Midland and Great Northern Joint Railway line between South Lynn and Melton Constable. It closed in 1959 along with the rest of the line.

Preceding station	Disused railways	Following station
Grimston Road	Midland and Great Northern	Massingham
