= Clenchwarton =

Village in Norfolk, England

Coordinates: 52°45′19″N 0°21′15″E

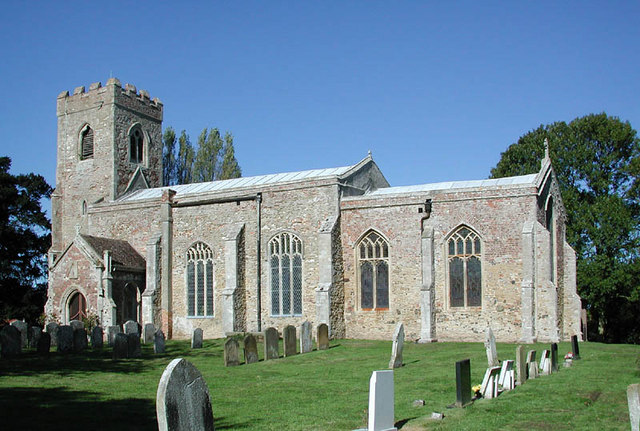
- St. Margaret's Church

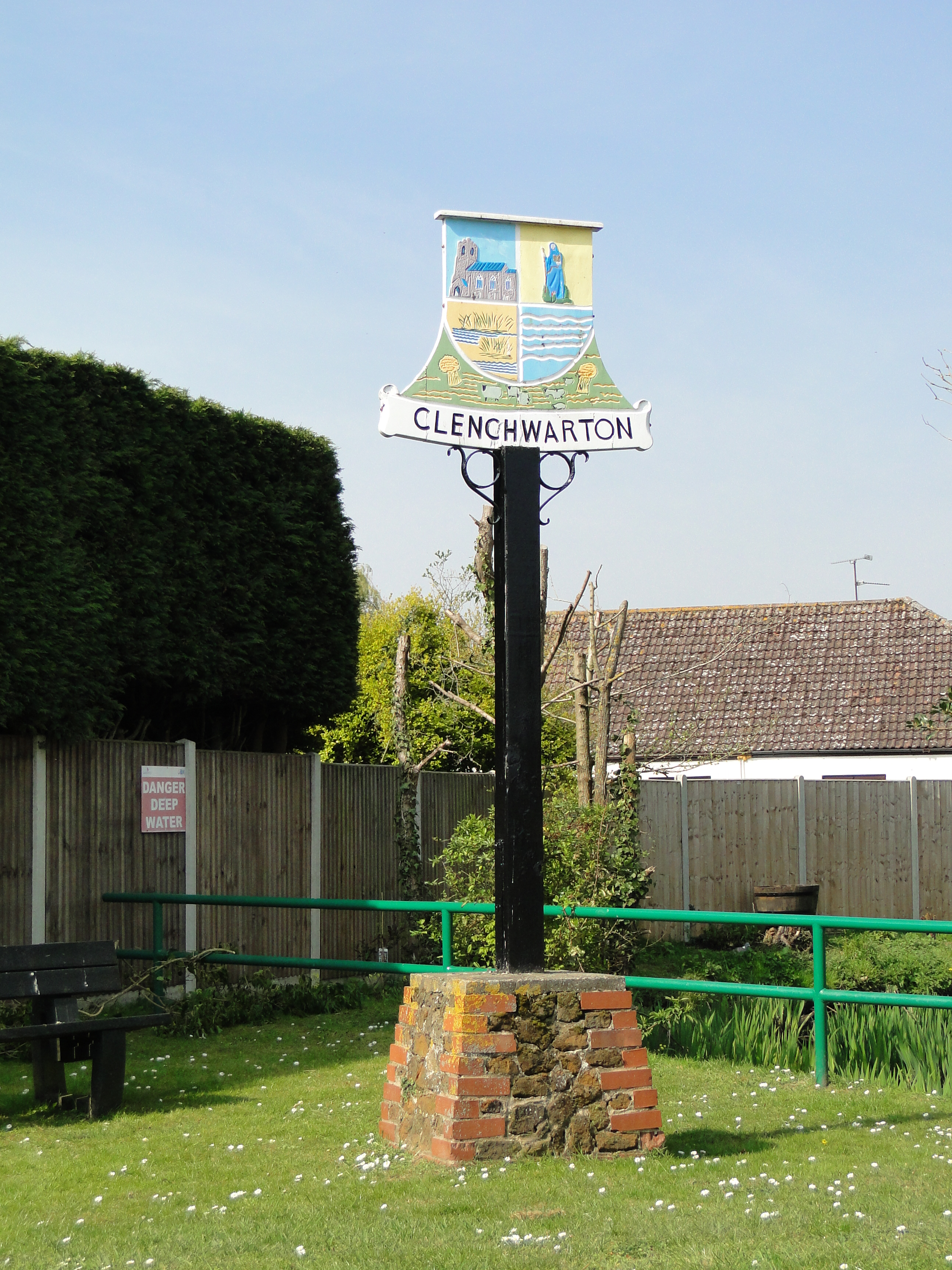
- Clenchwarton Village Sign

- Location within Norfolk
- Area: 4.86 sq mi (12.6 km^{2})
- Population: 2,223 (2021)
  - Density: 457/sq mi (176/km^{2})
- OS grid reference: TF588201
  - London: 88 miles (142 km) SW
- District: King's Lynn and West Norfolk
- Shire county: Norfolk
- Region: East
- Country: England
- Sovereign state: United Kingdom
- Post town: KING'S LYNN
- Postcode district: PE34
- Dialling code: 01553
- Police: Norfolk
- Fire: Norfolk
- Ambulance: East of England
- UK Parliament: North West Norfolk

Clenchwarton is a village, civil parish and electoral ward in the English county of Norfolk.

Clenchwarton is located 2.7 miles (4.3 km) west of King's Lynn, separated by the River Great Ouse, and 41 miles (66 km) west of Norwich.

== History ==
Clenchwarton's name is of Anglo-Saxon origin and derives from the Old English for a hill dweller's farmstead or settlement.

In the Domesday Book of 1086, Clenchwarton is recorded as an abandoned village with no recorded population in the hundred of Freebridge. The village was part of the estates of William d'Ecouis. The abandonment of the village was likely the result of the Norman reprisals in retaliation for the Ely Rebellion of 1070, led by Hereward the Wake.

The village was also surveyed by the Victorian traveller, John Marius, in the 1870s. He wrote the following about the village in the Imperial Gazetteer: "church is old but good. There are a N.Methodist chapel, and a national school."

During the Second World War, anti-tank defences were built in Clenchwarton to defend against a possible German invasion of East Anglia.

== Geography ==
According to the 2021 census, the population of Clenchwarton is 2,223 people which shows an increase from the 2,171 people listed in the 2011 census.

The parish is bordered to the east by the River Great Ouse and to the south by the A17, between Newark-on-Trent and King's Lynn.

== St. Margaret's Church ==
Clenchwarton's parish church is dedicated to Saint Margaret of Scotland and is located on Church Road. The church dates back to the Fourteenth Century and has been Grade II listed since 1951.

The church boasts stained-glass windows installed by Hardman & Co. with one from the 1920s depicting Mary Elizabeth Townsend as well as other windows designed by Charles Gibbs. There is also a memorial to Pte. Clifford J. Gosling of the 1st Bn., Royal Norfolk Regiment who was killed in a forest fire during Operation Lucky Alphonse during the Cyprus Emergency in the late 1950s. Gosling is buried in Wayne's Keep Military Cemetery, Nicosia.

St Margaret's Churchyard holds a listed headstone dedicated to Christopher Hudson which dates to 1709, and the remains of a medieval cross.

Clenchwarton is also home to a Methodist Church which still hosts regular services.

== Amenities ==
Most local children attend the local Clenchwarton Community Primary School which is part of the West Norfolk Academies Trust. The school was rated 'Good' by Ofsted in 2017.

The local convenience store can be located on Main Road, just opposite the Primary School. The shop also has a Post Office inside.

The village is home to Clenchwarton Football Club which hosts several youth and adult teams. The first XI compete in the North-West Norfolk Saturday League.

The village is also home to a lawn bowls team.

== Transport ==
Clenchwarton Railway Station opened in 1866 as part of the Lynn and Sutton Bridge Railway and was eventually closed in 1959.

Public transport through the village is now provided by bus route 505 between King's Lynn and Spalding. It is part of the Lincolnshire Interconnect network and currently operated by Stagecoach in Lincolnshire.

== Governance ==
Clenchwarton is an electoral ward for local elections and is part of the district of King's Lynn and West Norfolk.

The village's national constituency is North West Norfolk which has been represented by the Conservative's James Wild MP since 2019.

== War Memorial ==
Clenchwarton's main war memorial is a marble plaque located inside St. Margaret's Church with a further memorial to the fallen on the Peace Cottages on Church Road. The memorial lists the following names for the First World War:

Rank	Name	Unit	Date of death	Burial
LCpl.	Arthur W. Benton	9th Bn., Duke of Wellington's Regt.	31 Oct. 1918	Awoingt Cemetery
LCpl.	Charles A. Maycraft	1st Bn., Norfolk Regiment	5 Sep. 1916	Dive Copse Cemetery
Dvr.	Herbert E. Chamberlain	Army Service Corps	4 May 1915	Menin Gate
Dvr.	Alfred H. Collison	83rd Bde., Royal Horse Artillery	7 Oct. 1917	Vlamertinge Cemetery
Gnr.	William E. Killingsworth	177th Bde., Royal Field Artillery	6 Jul. 1917	Brandhoek Cemetery
Pte.	Henry W. Peake	6th Bn., Border Regiment	29 Sep. 1916	Contay British Cemetery
Pte.	Samuel G. Vincent	6th Bn., The Buffs	10 Apr. 1917	Duisans Cemetery
Pte.	Alfred Beaumont	2nd Bn., Essex Regiment	12 Apr. 1917	Athies Cemetery
Pte.	Ralph Coates	1st (City) Bn., London Regiment	24 Aug. 1918	Summit Trench Cem.
Pte.	Alfred Cyril Meek	2/6th Bn., Manchester Regiment	1 May 1918	Cologne Southern Cem.
Pte.	George E. Maycraft	1/5th Bn., Norfolk Regiment	19 Apr. 1917	Gaza War Cemetery
Pte.	Walter Sydney Meek	7th Bn., Norfolk Regt.	28 Oct. 1915	Haisnes Cemetery
Pte.	Sydney E. Killingsworth	2nd Bn., Northamptonshire Regt.	27 May 1918	Soissons Memorial
Pte.	William H. Haynes	11th Bn., Suffolk Regiment	9 Apr. 1918	Le Grand Beaumart Cem.
Sig.	Joseph Howard	7th Bn., Norfolk Regiment	28 Mar. 1918	Doullens Cemetery
Spr.	Harry Coates	287th Coy., Royal Engineers	10 Jan. 1919	Mikra British Cemetery
St.	Harry Coy	HMS Vanguard	9 Jul. 1917	Chatham Naval Memorial

And, the following for the Second World War:

Rank	Name	Unit	Date of death	Burial
Sgt.	Russell E. Fuller	No. 77 Squadron RAF	24 Aug. 1943	Berlin War Cemetery
LAC	Ernest G. Usher	Royal Air Force Volunteer Reserve	16 May 1946	St. Margaret's Churchyard
Gnr.	Ernest F. W. Wake	2 Regt., Royal Horse Artillery	3 Jul. 1942	Alamein Memorial
Pte.	Arthur G. Gompertz	Royal Army Service Corps	17 Jun. 1940	Dolus-d'Oléron Cemetery
Pte.	Cecil V. Hare	30th Bn., Royal Norfolk Regiment	25 Sep. 1942	St. Margaret's Churchyard
