= Tydd railway station =

Former railway station in Lincolnshire, England

Coordinates: 52.7401°N 0.1682°E

Tydd

General information
- Location: Tydd Gote, Lincolnshire; England
- Platforms: 2

Other information
- Status: Disused

History
- Original company: Peterborough, Wisbeach and Sutton Railway
- Pre-grouping: Midland and Great Northern Joint Railway
- Post-grouping: Midland and Great Northern Joint Railway

Key dates
- 1 August 1866: Opened
- 2 March 1959: Closed
Location

Tydd railway station was a station, opened by the Peterborough, Wisbeach and Sutton Railway on 1 August 1866, in Lincolnshire serving the villages of Tydd St Mary, Tydd Gote and Tydd St Giles, Cambridgeshire on the Midland and Great Northern Joint Railway route between Sutton Bridge and Wisbech. It closed on 2 March 1959.

Preceding station	Disused railways	Following station
Ferry	Midland and Great Northern; Peterborough Line	Sutton Bridge
