= North Drove railway station =

Former railway station in Lincolnshire, England

North Drove
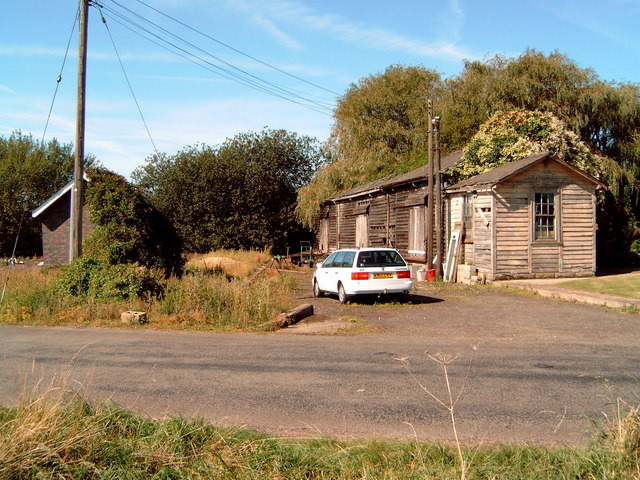
- Goods shed and weighbridge office at North Drove Station

General information
- Location: Pode Hole, South Holland, Lincolnshire; England
- Coordinates: 52.77556°N 0.20806°W
- Grid reference: TF208212
- Platforms: 1

Other information
- Status: Disused

History
- Original company: Spalding and Bourn Railway
- Pre-grouping: Midland and Great Northern Joint Railway
- Post-grouping: Midland and Great Northern Joint Railway

Key dates
- 1 August 1866: Opened
- 9 October 1880: Closed
- 1 February 1881: Opened
- 15 September 1958: Closed for passengers
- 30 March 1964: closed for freight
Location

North Drove railway station was a station serving Pode Hole in Lincolnshire, England. It was on the route of the Spalding and Bourn Railway (opened 1866), later part of the Midland and Great Northern Joint Railway.

== History ==
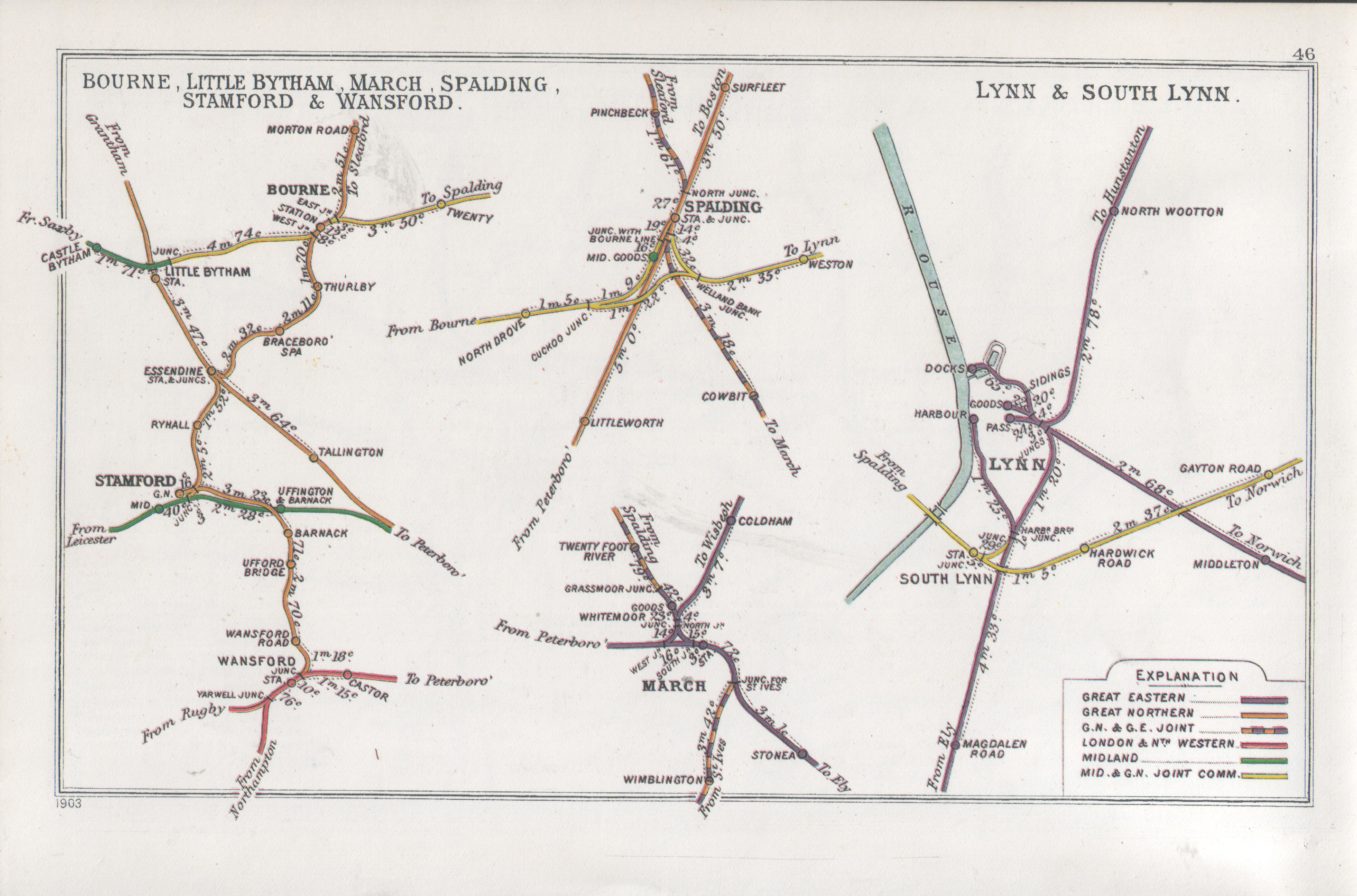
A 1903 Railway Clearing House map of railways in the vicinity of North Drove (upper centre)

The station and line opened on 1 August 1866, closed temporarily between 9 October 1880 and 1 February 1881, and closed permanently on 15 September 1958, although the line remained open for goods until 1964. The three intermediate stations between Spalding and Bourne had unusual names, because there were few nearby settlements; the local meaning of "Drove" is a road flanked by ditches or streams.

Former Services

Preceding station	Disused railways	Following station
Counter Drain Line and station closed	Midland and Great Northern Joint Railway	Spalding Line closed, station open
Counter Drain Line and station closed	Midland and Great Northern Joint Railway	Weston Line and station closed
