= Long Sutton railway station =

Former railway station in Lincolnshire, England

Coordinates: 52.7848°N 0.1160°E

Long Sutton

General information
- Location: England
- Grid reference: TF426229
- Platforms: 1

Other information
- Status: Disused

History
- Original company: Norwich and Spalding Railway
- Pre-grouping: Midland and Great Northern Joint Railway
- Post-grouping: Midland and Great Northern Joint Railway; Eastern Region of British Railways

Key dates
- 1 July 1862: Opened
- 2 March 1959: Closed to passengers
- 5 April 1965: closed for freight
Location

Long Sutton railway station was a station in Long Sutton, Lincolnshire, England. It was part of the Midland and Great Northern Joint Railway which closed in 1959.

Preceding station	Disused railways	Following station
Gedney; Line and station closed	Midland and Great Northern	Sutton Bridge; Line and station closed
