= Ferry railway station =

Former railway station in Cambridgeshire, England

Ferry
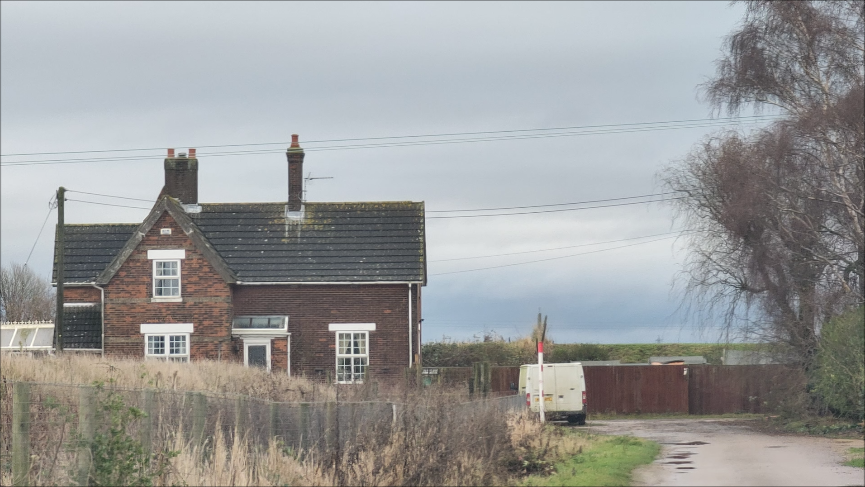
- Ferry station in 2022

General information
- Location: Newton-in-the-Isle, Fenland; England
- Coordinates: 52.7046°N 0.1555°E
- Grid reference: TF456141

Other information
- Status: Disused

History
- Original company: Peterborough, Wisbeach and Sutton Railway
- Pre-grouping: Midland and Great Northern Joint Railway
- Post-grouping: Midland and Great Northern Joint Railway

Key dates
- 1 August 1866: Opened
- 2 March 1959: Closed
Location

Ferry railway station was a railway station in Newton-in-the-Isle, Cambridgeshire. It was on the Midland and Great Northern Joint Railway between Sutton Bridge and Wisbech. Its location was fairly rural, and a large amount of its traffic would have been farm goods. The line it stood on closed in 1959.

Former Services

Preceding station	Disused railways	Following station
Wisbech North	Midland and Great Northern; Peterborough Line	Tydd
