= Counter Drain railway station =

Former railway station in Lincolnshire, England

Counter Drain
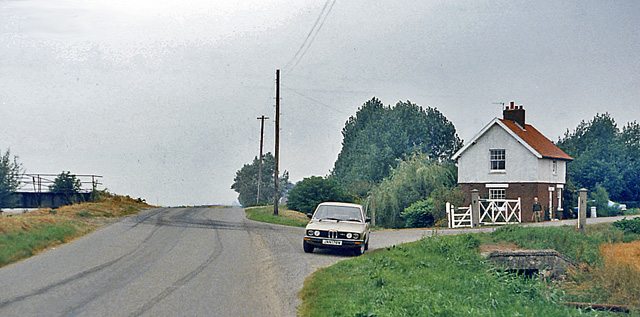
- Site of former station

General information
- Location: Tongue End, South Holland, Lincolnshire; England
- Coordinates: 52.77250°N 0.25500°W
- Grid reference: TF179208
- Platforms: 1

Other information
- Status: Disused

History
- Original company: Spalding and Bourn Railway
- Pre-grouping: Midland and Great Northern Joint Railway
- Post-grouping: Midland and Great Northern Joint Railway

Key dates
- 1 August 1866: Opened
- 9 October 1880: Closed
- 1 February 1881: Opened
- 2 March 1959: Closed for passengers
- 30 March 1964: closed for freight
Location

Counter Drain railway station was a remote station in Lincolnshire serving the village of Tongue End. It was on the route of the Spalding and Bourn Railway (opened 1866), later part of the Midland and Great Northern Joint Railway which ran across East Anglia to the Norfolk Coast. The station opened with the line on 1 August 1866, closed temporarily between 9 October 1880 and 1 February 1881, and closed permanently on 2 March 1959, although the line remained open for goods until 1964. The three intermediate stations between Spalding and Bourne had unusual names, because there were few nearby settlements; "Counter Drain" was the name of a drainage ditch close to the station.

| Preceding station | Disused railways | Following station |
|---|---|---|
| Twenty Line and station closed | Midland and Great Northern Joint Railway | North Drove Line and station closed |
