= Terrington railway station =

Former railway station in Norfolk, England

Coordinates: 52.7466°N 0.2962°E

Terrington

General information
- Location: Terrington St Clement, King's Lynn and West Norfolk; England
- Grid reference: TF551190
- Platforms: 2

Other information
- Status: Disused

History
- Pre-grouping: Lynn & Sutton Bridge Railway; Midland and Great Northern Joint Railway
- Post-grouping: Midland and Great Northern Joint Railway; Eastern Region of British Railways

Key dates
- 1 March 1866: Opened
- 2 March 1959: Closed
Location

Terrington railway station is a former station in Terrington St Clement, Norfolk. It opened in 1866 and was closed in 1959. It was on the Midland and Great Northern Joint Railway between the Midlands and Melton Constable.

Former Services

| Preceding station | Disused railways | Following station |
|---|---|---|
| Walpole | Midland and Great Northern | Clenchwarton |
