= Fleet railway station (Lincolnshire) =

Former railway station in Lincolnshire, England

Coordinates: 52.7982°N 0.0631°E

Fleet
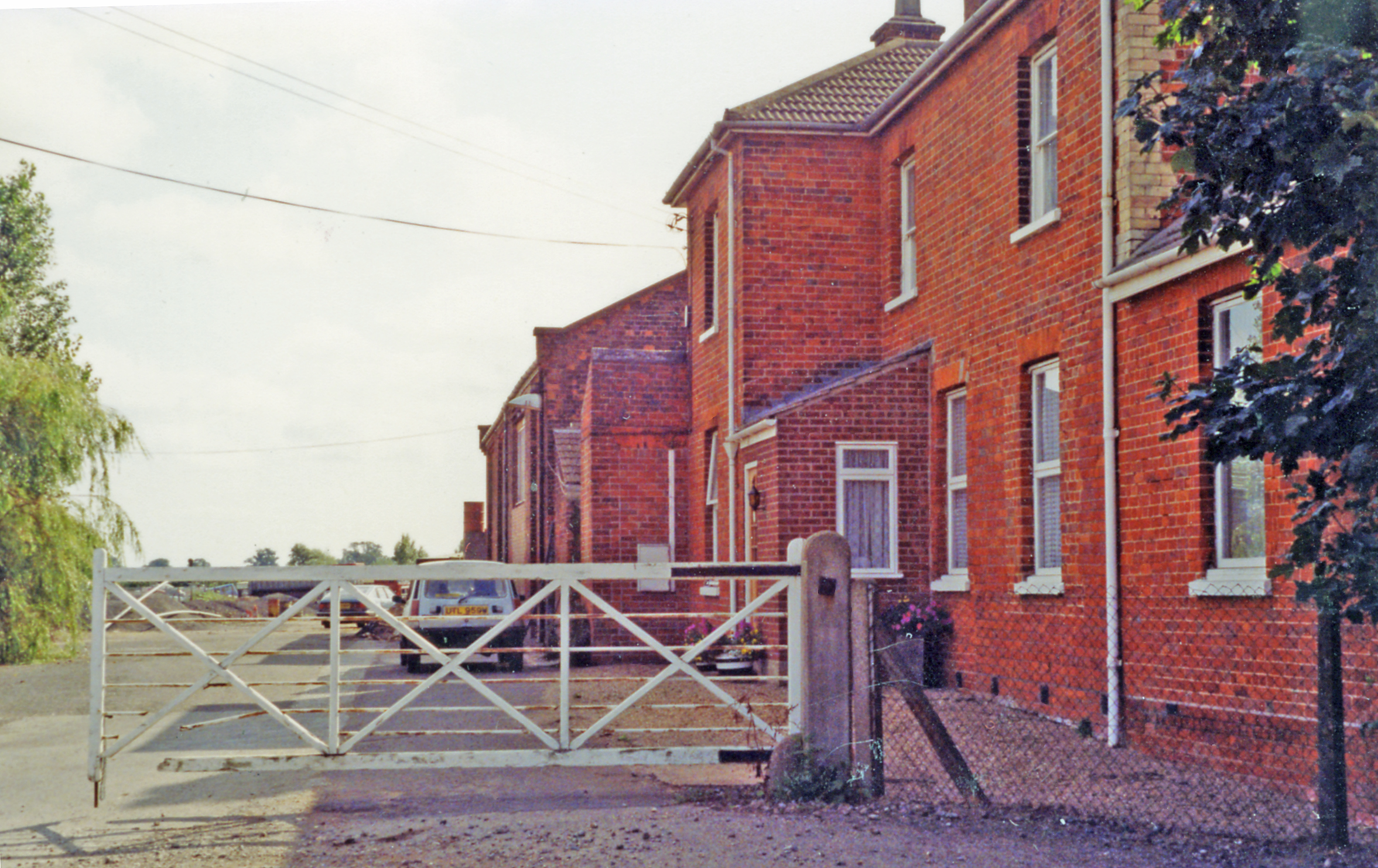
- The station building in 1998

General information
- Location: England

Other information
- Status: Disused

History
- Pre-grouping: Midland and Great Northern Joint Railway
- Post-grouping: Midland and Great Northern Joint Railway

Key dates
- November 1862: Opened
- 2 March 1959: Closed for passengers
- 3 February 1964: closed for goods
Location

Fleet railway station was a station in Fleet, Lincolnshire. It opened in 1862 and closed to passengers in 1959, with the goods yard closing on 3 February 1964.

Preceding station	Disused railways	Following station
Holbeach; Line and station closed	Midland and Great Northern	Gedney; Line and station closed
