= Gedney railway station =

Former railway station in Lincolnshire, England

Coordinates: 52.7933°N 0.0925°E

Gedney

General information
- Location: England
- Grid reference: TF410238
- Platforms: 2

Other information
- Status: Disused

History
- Original company: Norwich and Spalding Railway
- Pre-grouping: Midland and Great Northern Joint Railway
- Post-grouping: Midland and Great Northern Joint Railway

Key dates
- 1 July 1862: Opened
- 2 March 1959: Closed for passengers
- 3 February 1964: closed for freight
Location

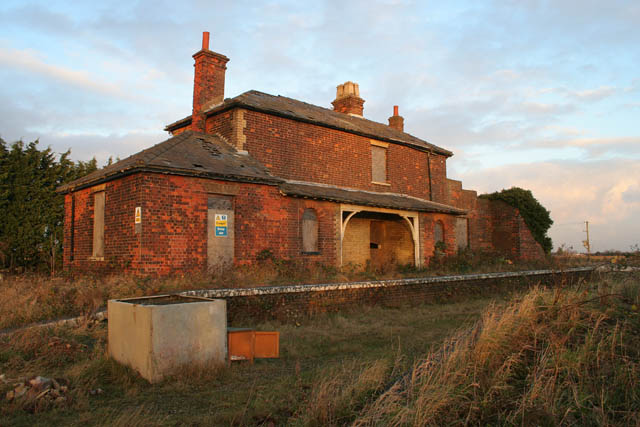
Station building

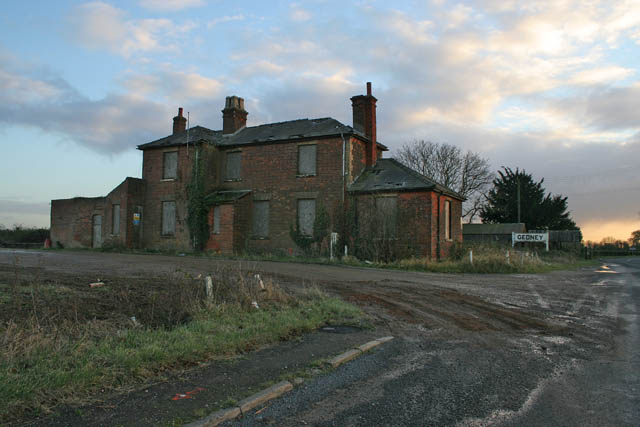
Station building

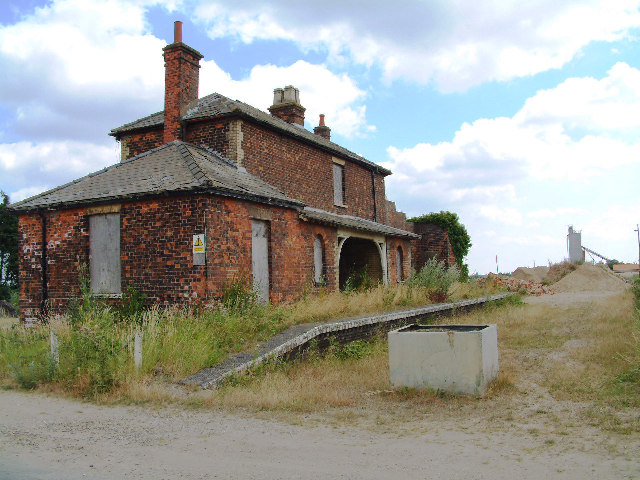
Trackbed

Gedney railway station was a station in Gedney, Lincolnshire. It was a station on the Midland and Great Northern Joint Railway network. It opened on 1 July 1862, and closed on 2 March 1959. The station building survives, and has been renovated as a residential dwelling.

Preceding station	Disused railways	Following station
Fleet; Line and station closed	Midland and Great Northern	Long Sutton; Line and station closed
