= King's Lynn Rural District =

Local government area in the UK, from 1894 to 1935

Coordinates: 52.75°N 0.37°E

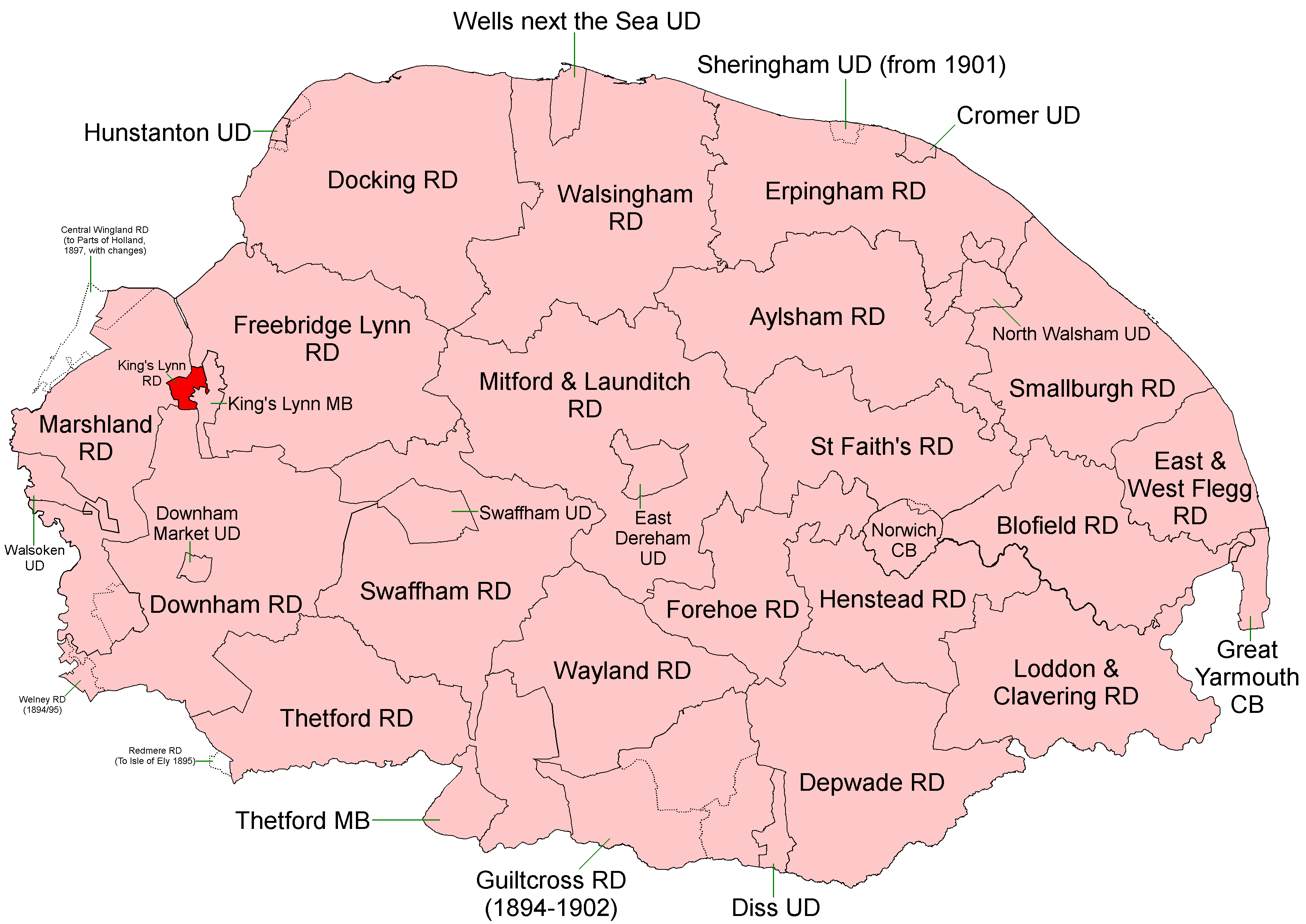
Boundaries in 1894.

King's Lynn Rural District was a rural district in Norfolk from 1894 to 1935. It was situated on the west bank of the River Great Ouse, opposite the town of King's Lynn, and comprised the then single civil parish of West Lynn.

The district was split in 1935 with the urban part becoming part of the borough of King's Lynn, and the rest becoming part of Marshland Rural District. Today the area covered by the old rural district is within the district of King's Lynn and West Norfolk.
