= Clenchwarton railway station =

Former railway station in Norfolk, England

Coordinates: 52.74666°N 0.32746°E

Clenchwarton

General information
- Location: Clenchwarton, King's Lynn and West Norfolk; England
- Grid reference: TF572191
- Platforms: 2

Other information
- Status: Disused

History
- Pre-grouping: Lynn & Sutton Bridge Railway; Midland and Great Northern Joint Railway
- Post-grouping: Midland and Great Northern Joint Railway; Eastern Region of British Railways

Key dates
- 1 March 1866: Opened
- 2 March 1959: Closed
Location

Clenchwarton Railway Station is a former train station in Clenchwarton, Norfolk. It was part of the Midland and Great Northern Joint Railway line from the Midlands to Great Yarmouth.

Former Services

Preceding station	Disused railways	Following station
Terrington	Midland and Great Northern	South Lynn
