= Sutton Bridge railway station =

Former railway station in Lincolnshire, England

Coordinates: 52.7667°N 0.1918°E

Sutton Bridge
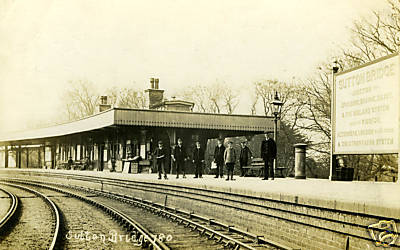

General information
- Location: Sutton Bridge, South Holland, Lincolnshire; England
- Grid reference: TF481210
- Platforms: 2

Other information
- Status: Disused

History
- Original company: Lynn & Sutton Bridge Railway
- Pre-grouping: Midland and Great Northern Joint Railway
- Post-grouping: Midland and Great Northern Joint Railway; Eastern Region of British Railways

Key dates
- 1 March 1866: Opened
- 2 March 1959: Closed to passengers
- 5 April 1965: Closed to freight
Location

Sutton Bridge railway station was a station in Sutton Bridge, south Lincolnshire, England, which opened in the 19th century. It became part of the Midland and Great Northern Joint Railway network, and served as a junction where the line from Great Yarmouth split into two sections one heading for Wisbech and Peterborough and the other for Spalding. The station closed with the line in 1959.

Former Services

Preceding station	Disused railways	Following station
Long Sutton	Midland and Great Northern; Spalding Branch	Walpole
Tydd	Midland and Great Northern; Wisbech Branch	Walpole
