= West Lynn, Norfolk =

Coordinates: 52.75626°N 0.38726°E

West Lynn
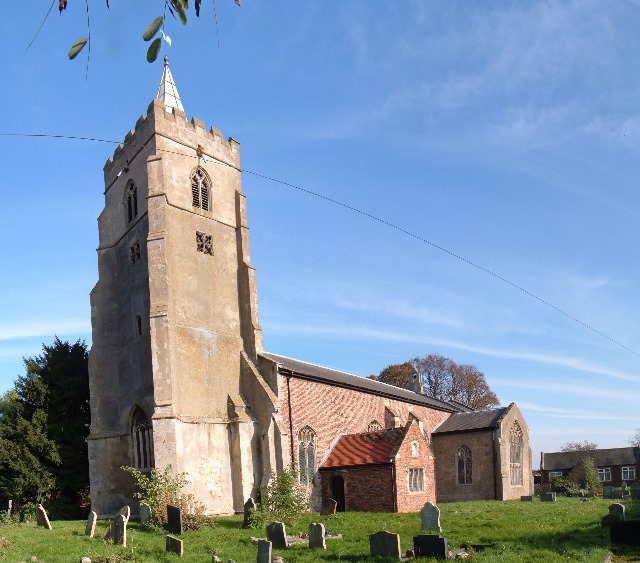
- St Peter's Church

- Location within Norfolk
- District: King's Lynn and West Norfolk
- Shire county: Norfolk
- Region: East
- Country: England
- Sovereign state: United Kingdom
- Post town: KING'S LYNN
- Postcode district: PE34
- Dialling code: 01553
- UK Parliament: North West Norfolk

West Lynn is a suburb of King's Lynn in Norfolk, England, situated on the west bank of the River Great Ouse. It is linked to the main part of the town, on the east bank, either by a passenger ferry or via a more circuitous 4 kilometres (2 mi) road journey.

West Lynn was an ancient parish, and until 1935 it was outside the borough boundaries of King's Lynn. From 1894 it was the sole parish in King's Lynn Rural District. In 1931 the parish had a population of 931. The parish was abolished on 1 April 1935. The more built-up part, including the old West Lynn village, became part of the borough of King's Lynn. The rest of the former parish was transferred to Clenchwarton in Marshland Rural District. It is in the South and West Lynn Ward of King's Lynn and West Norfolk Council.

West Lynn has a primary school and a range of basic services.

West Lynn Primary School received a "good" rating from Ofsted in 2019.

== Ferry ==
The King's Lynn Ferry has linked West Lynn to the main part of King's Lynn since 1285. The ferry is operated by West Lynn Ferry Ltd. and runs Monday to Saturday. It carried 85,000 passengers in 2011. The service is subsidised by West Norfolk Council and was previously subsidised by Norfolk County Council. The ferry service was suspended in early 2025 due to safety concerns regarding the landing infrastructure. Following the completion of restoration works, the service has since resumed.

== Notable people ==
- Phil Easton, radio broadcaster, born in West Lynn
