= Midland and Great Northern Joint Railway =

Former railway network in England

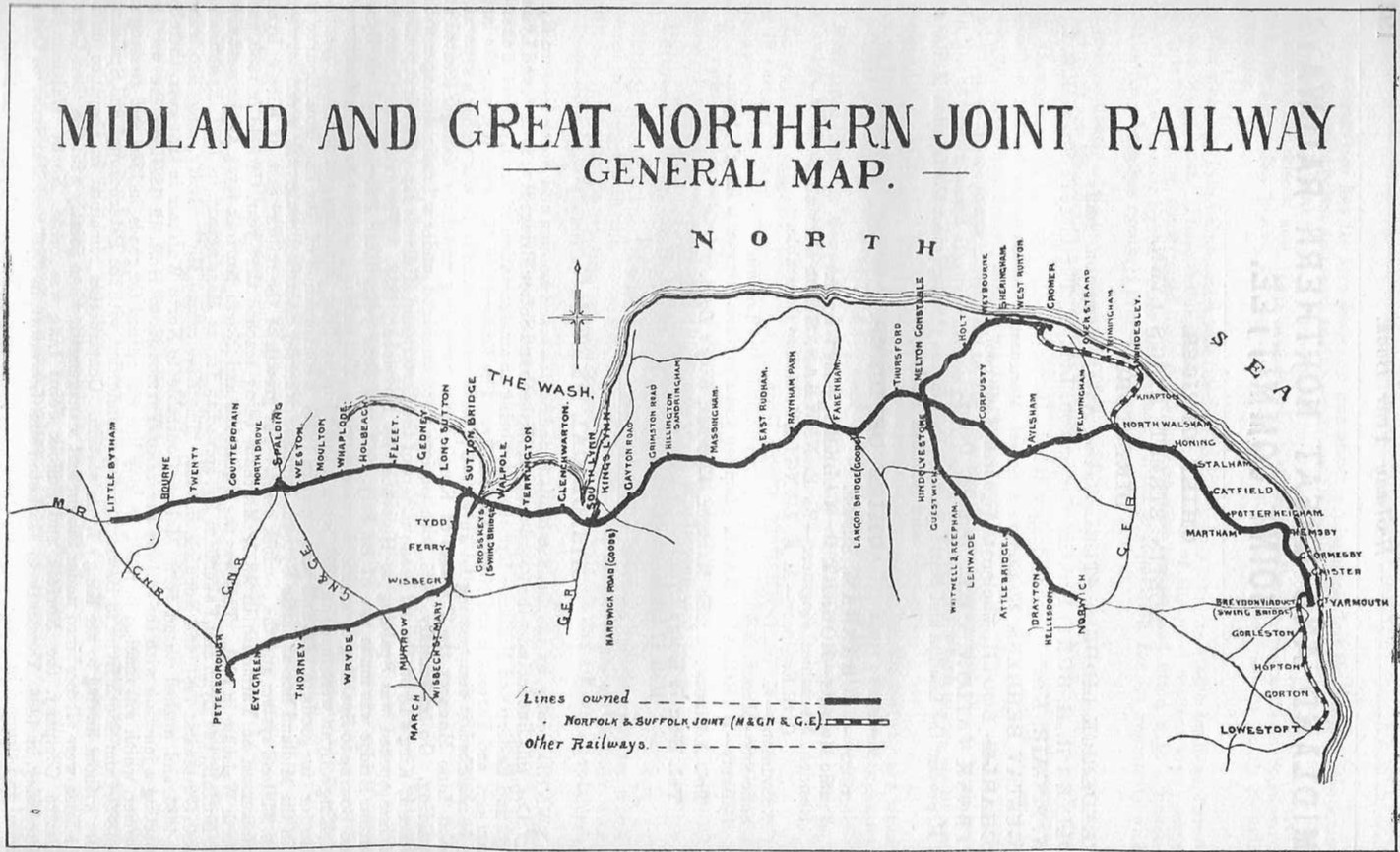
- 1926 map of M&GNJR

Overview
- Status: Defunct
- Locale: East of England

Service
- Type: Regional rail

History
- Opened: 1858-1893
- 1893: Midland and Great Northern Joint Railway is incorporated
- 1948: The railway is nationalised under British Rail
- Closed: 1959-1965 (vast majority)
- Reopened: 1975-2010 (5.25 miles (8.45 km) by North Norfolk Railway)

Technical
- Line length: 183 miles 20 chains (294.9 km) (1925)
- Track length: 261 miles 4 chains (420.1 km) (1925)
- Num of tracks: Majority single track. 74 miles 25 chains (119.6 km) double track.
- Track gauge: 4 ft 8 1/2 in (1,435 mm)

The Midland and Great Northern Joint Railway (M&GNJR) was a railway network in England, in the area connecting southern Lincolnshire, the Isle of Ely and north Norfolk. It developed from several local independent concerns and was incorporated in 1893. It was jointly owned by the Midland Railway and the Great Northern Railway, and those companies had long sponsored and operated the predecessor companies.

The area directly served was agricultural and sparsely populated, but seaside holidays had developed and the M&GNJR ran many long-distance express trains to and from the territory of the parent companies, as well as summer local trains for holidaymakers. It had the longest mileage of any joint railway in the United Kingdom.

In the grouping of 1923, the two joint owners of the M&GNJR were absorbed into two separate companies (the Midland into the London, Midland and Scottish Railway and the Great Northern into the London and North Eastern Railway). The M&GNJR maintained a distinct identity which only formally ended with nationalisation in 1948. After 1945 the profitability of the network declined steeply, worsened by the seasonality of the business. It was duplicated by other lines and the decision was taken to close it. Most of the network closed in 1959, although some limited sections continued in use. Only a short section near Sheringham is in commercial use today, but the North Norfolk Railway is active as a heritage line.

== First railways ==
The area eventually served by the Midland and Great Northern Joint Railway, taken as south Lincolnshire and north Norfolk, was late to be supplied with railway connections due to being sparsely populated fenland. The Great Northern Railway (GNR), running north through Huntingdon, Peterborough and on to Grantham, so forming the western edge of the area, was not authorised until 1846 and not opened until 1848 between Peterborough and Lincoln. The Eastern Counties Railway (ECR), authorised in 1836, aspired to reach Norwich and Yarmouth, but ran out of money and stopped short.

In frustration local people obtained authority for the Yarmouth and Norwich Railway in the Yarmouth and Norwich Railway Act 1842 (5 & 6 Vict. c. lxxxii). Running via Reedham it opened to the public on 1 May 1844. In 1845 railway mania was underway, and a myriad of railway schemes was put before Parliament. Many of these foundered there, or were authorised but failed to generate investors' commitment.

By 1850 the ECR had recovered from its financial difficulties of 1836 and had connected practically every town of importance in East Anglia into its system. For some years the ECR had successfully resisted the promotion of independent railways in its area but this could not continue indefinitely, and some local lines began to obtain authorisation.

The East Anglian Railway Company was an amalgamation of three earlier companies, the Lynn and Dereham Railway, the Lynn and Ely Railway and the Ely and Huntingdon Railway. The company became bankrupt early in 1851 and the GNR, operating the East Coast Main Line at Peterborough, leased the line. Using running powers between its line at Peterborough and March over the ECR, it intended to connect to King's Lynn via the Wisbech line of the East Anglian Railway. However the powers acquired from Parliament did not include a short section between the two companies' stations at Wisbech, and the scheme foundered. The GNR sold the line on to the ECR in 1852.

The financial performance of the ECR declined over the years and in 1862 it was absorbed into the new Great Eastern Railway (GER).

== Constituents of the M&GNJR ==
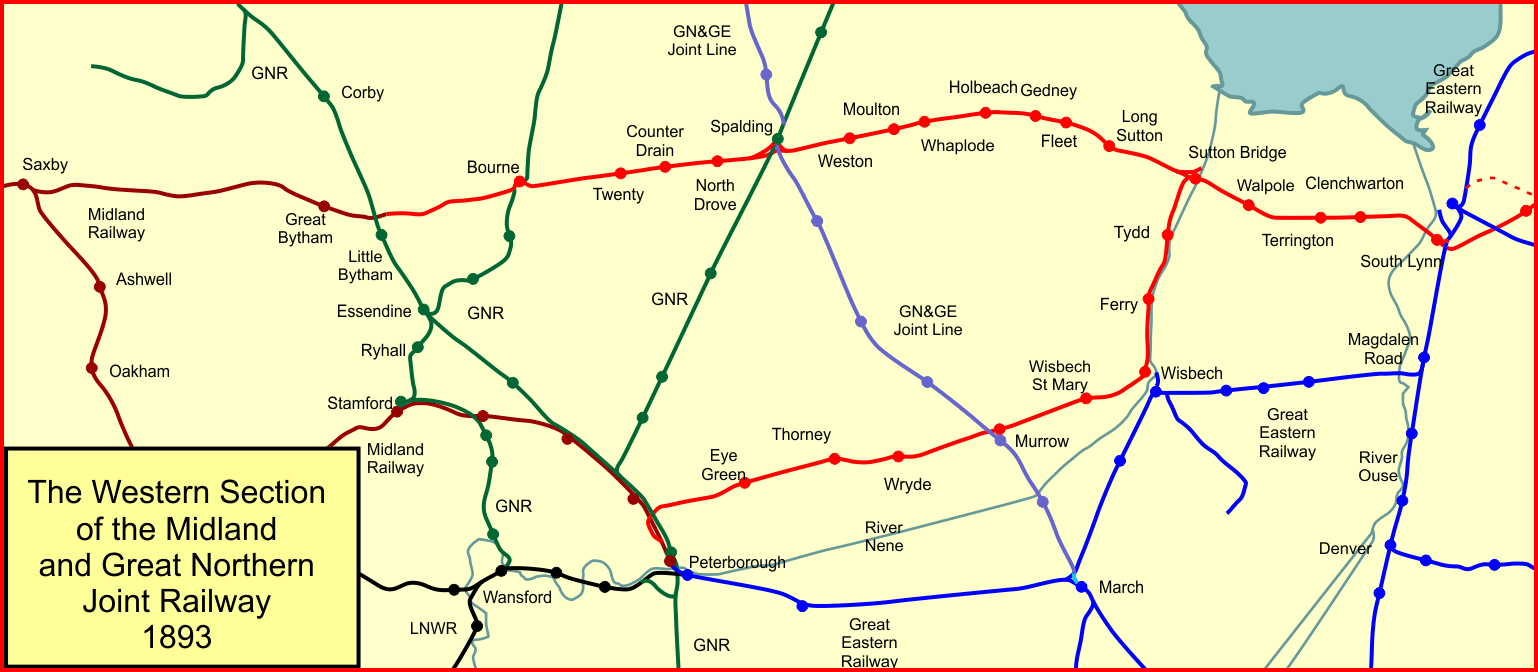
The western section of the later M&GNJR

The ultimate formation of the M&GNJR resulted from the fusion of numerous local schemes, though they did not at first aspire to form a connected railway.

=== Norwich and Spalding Railway ===
Norwich and Spalding Railway Act 1853
- Act of Parliament
- Parliament of the United Kingdom
- Long title: An Act for making a Railway from Spalding to Sutton Bridge and Wisbeach.
- Citation: 16 & 17 Vict. c. cxxiv

Dates
- Royal assent: 4 August 1853

Text of statute as originally enacted

On 4 August 1853 the Norwich and Spalding Railway obtained its an act of Parliament, the Norwich and Spalding Railway Act 1853 (16 & 17 Vict. c. cxxiv), for a line from Spalding to Sutton Bridge, and from there to Wisbech. Notwithstanding the company's title, reaching Norwich was an (unfulfilled) aspiration for later rather than an immediate intention. The act stipulated that the other parts of the proposed Norwich and Spalding system could not be opened unless genuine progress was being made with the Wisbech connection.

In fact at this time the money market was particularly difficult, partly because of the Crimean War, and the company was unable to attract enough investment. It only managed to build from Spalding to Holbeach, 7 1/2 miles (12 km), opening to Holbeach for goods on 9 August 1858 and for passengers on 15 November 1858. The Wisbech stipulation appears to have been overlooked for the time being.

The line connected with the Great Northern Railway (GNR) at Spalding and the GNR agreed to work the line for three years. There were four trains daily except Sundays, with one extra on Tuesdays.

Norwich and Spalding Railway Act 1859
- Act of Parliament
- Parliament of the United Kingdom
- Long title: An Act to enable the Norwich and Spalding Railway Company to extend their Railway from Holbeach to Sutton Bridge in Lincolnshire.
- Citation: 22 & 23 Vict. c. cxviii

Dates
- Royal assent: 13 August 1859

Norwich and Spalding Railway Act 1867
- Act of Parliament
- Parliament of the United Kingdom
- Long title: An Act to cancel Two Bonds entered into by the Norwich and Spalding Railway Company; and for other Purposes relating to the Company.
- Citation: 30 & 31 Vict. c. xxxi

Dates
- Royal assent: 31 May 1867

Text of statute as originally enacted

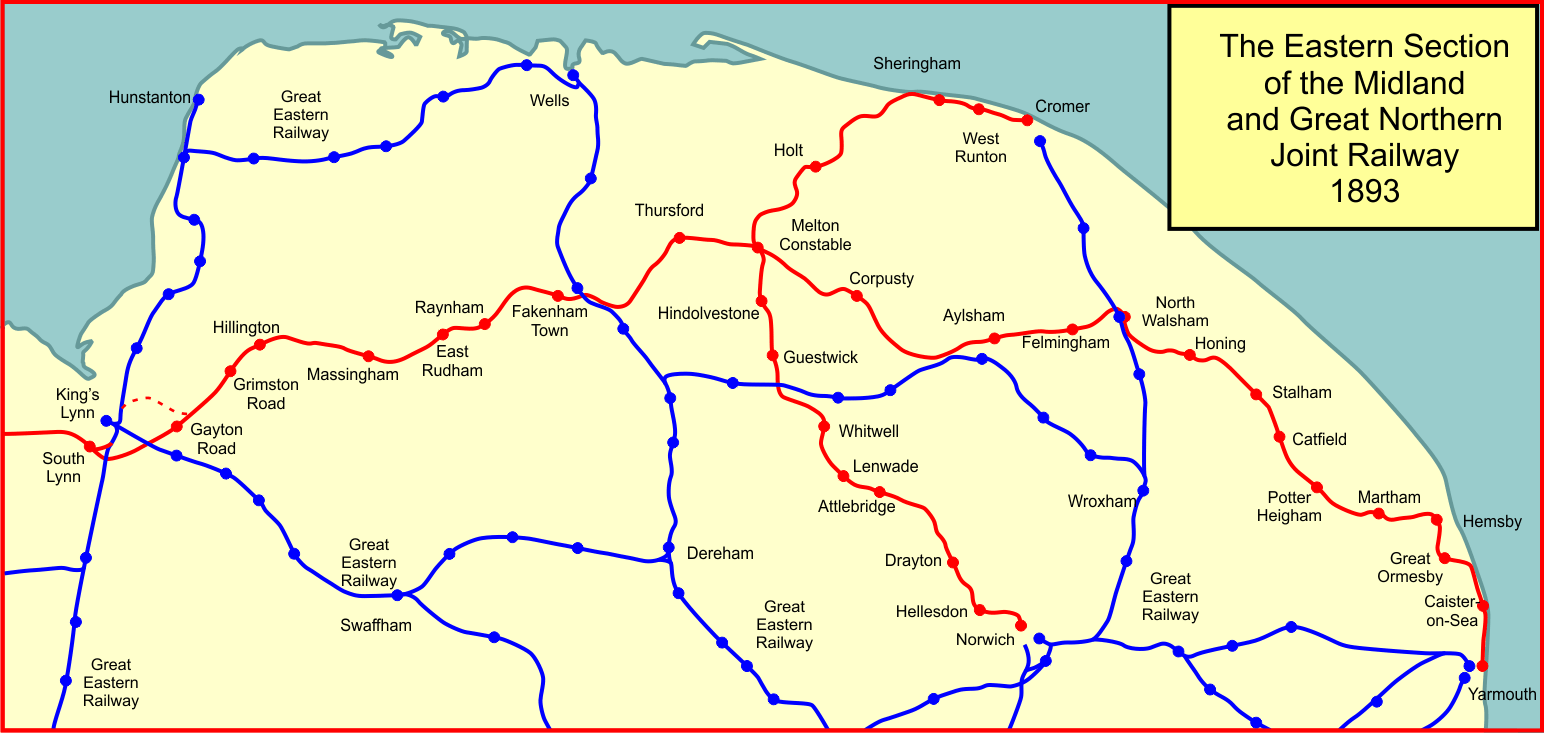
The eastern section of the later M&GNJR

The company obtained a further authorising act of Parliament, the Norwich and Spalding Railway Act 1859 (22 & 23 Vict. c. cxviii) to extend from Holbeach to Sutton Bridge, as the earlier powers had expired. Wisbech was omitted this time, but the act stipulated that no dividend might be declared unless the company proceeded with the promotion of the Wisbech line in Parliament. This was attempted in 1860 but rejected in Parliament, and again in 1862 and 1863. The GNR agreed to extend the working arrangement to ten years from 1 November 1861 for 50% of receipts and to carry out some permanent way improvements on the original section. The Sutton Bridge station was on the site of the later goods station, west of the River Nene. The extension to Holbeach was completed and opened on 1 July 1862.

=== Peterborough, Wisbeach and Sutton Railway ===
Peterborough, Wisbeach, and Sutton Railway Act 1863
- Act of Parliament
- Parliament of the United Kingdom
- Long title: An Act for making a Railway from Peterborough to Thorney, Wisbeach, and Sutton; and for other Purposes.
- Citation: 26 & 27 Vict. c. ccxxii

Dates
- Royal assent: 28 July 1863

Text of statute as originally enacted

The line connecting Wisbech (Note: The spelling was Wisbeach until 1877.) to Sutton Bridge was considered important because Sutton Bridge was an important inland port further downstream on the River Nene than Wisbech port. Wisbech would have been reached by a southward branch of the Norwich and Spalding Railway, but now an alternative means of making the connection was brought forward. On 28 July 1863 the Peterborough, Wisbeach, and Sutton Railway Act 1863 (26 & 27 Vict. c. ccxxii) authorising the Peterborough, Wisbeach and Sutton Railway (PW&SR) was passed. Capital was to be £180,000.

In 1871 Richard Young a local shipowner (and later director of the Great Eastern Railway) was chairman of the company.

The Eastern Counties Railway had just been transformed into the Great Eastern Railway (GER), and powers were to be sought by the PW&SR to connect to the GER line at Wisbech. The Norwich and Spalding Railway was given running powers between Sutton Bridge and Wisbech. It was the Midland Railway (MR), not the GNR, that secured the contract for operating the new railway for 50% of receipts.

==== Extending to Wisbech ====
Peterborough, Wisbeach, and Sutton Railway Act 1864
- Act of Parliament
- Parliament of the United Kingdom
- Long title: An Act for authorizing the Peterborough, Wisbeach, and Sutton Railway Company to extend their Line of Railway; and for other Purposes.
- Citation: 27 & 28 Vict. c. ccxl

Dates
- Royal assent: 25 July 1864

Text of statute as originally enacted

Peterborough, Wisbeach, and Sutton Railway Act 1865
- Act of Parliament
- Parliament of the United Kingdom
- Long title: An Act for authorizing the Peterborough, Wisbeach, and Sutton Railway Company to extend their Railway to Crowland; and for other Purposes.
- Citation: 28 & 29 Vict. c. cccxl

Dates
- Royal assent: 5 July 1865

Peterborough, Wisbeach, and Sutton Railway (Capital) Act 1866
- Act of Parliament
- Parliament of the United Kingdom
- Long title: An Act for authorizing the Peterborough, Wisbeach, and Sutton Railway Company to regulate their existing Share Capital.
- Citation: 29 & 30 Vict. c. cclxvii

Dates
- Royal assent: 23 July 1866

Text of statute as originally enacted

The Peterborough, Wisbeach and Sutton Railway now got authorisation in the Peterborough, Wisbeach, and Sutton Railway Act 1864 (27 & 28 Vict. c. ccxl) to make a connecting line at Wisbech to the GER line, and to the harbour. The connection to the GER was in fact not made. On 1 August 1866 its main line opened for traffic. At Peterborough it started from the Midland Railway lines, on the west side of the GNR main line, and crossed both the Midland and GNR track by a bridge. The line was 27 miles (43 km) in length, to a junction at Sutton Bridge. The Midland Railway worked the trains, working to and from the GER station at Peterborough and calling at the GNR station en route.

=== Lynn and Sutton Bridge Railway ===
Lynn and Sutton Bridge Railway Act 1861
- Act of Parliament
- Parliament of the United Kingdom
- Long title: An Act to authorize the Construction of a Railway from the East Anglian Railways at Lynn to the Norwich and Spalding Railway at Sutton Bridge, and for other Purposes.
- Citation: 24 & 25 Vict. c. ccxlv

Dates
- Royal assent: 6 August 1861
Other legislation
Amended by	Lynn and Sutton Bridge Railway Act 1863

Lynn and Sutton Bridge Railway Act 1863
- Act of Parliament
- Parliament of the United Kingdom
- Long title: An Act to amend "The Lynn and Sutton Bridge Railway Act, 1861."
- Citation: 26 & 27 Vict. c. cxciii

Dates
- Royal assent: 21 July 1863
Other legislation
Amends	Lynn and Sutton Bridge Railway Act 1861

Text of statute as originally enacted

The next section of the future M&GNJR to be built was the Lynn and Sutton Bridge Railway, which was authorised by the Lynn and Sutton Bridge Railway Act 1861 (24 & 25 Vict. c. ccxlv) on 6 August 1861 with capital of £100,000. It was to connect with the Eastern Counties Railway (soon to be GER) at South Lynn, near the major port of King's Lynn. The authorisation obliged the company to construct a new rail and road bridge at Sutton Bridge, but this was modified by the Lynn and Sutton Bridge Railway Act 1863 (26 & 27 Vict. c. cxciii) which permitted the railway to purchase the existing road swing bridge, built in 1850, and adapt it for railway use as well. The line was opened for goods traffic throughout in November 1864 from a junction some distance south of King's Lynn station. Passenger trains provided by the GNR began on 1 March 1866.

=== Spalding and Bourn Railway ===
Spalding and Bourn Railway Act 1862
- Act of Parliament
- Parliament of the United Kingdom
- Long title: An Act for making a Railway, to be called "The Spalding and Bourn Railway," and for other Purposes.
- Citation: 25 & 26 Vict. c. cxcix

Dates
- Royal assent: 29 July 1862

On 29 July 1862 the Spalding and Bourn Railway (Note: The contemporary spelling; it was altered (in railway terminology) to Bourne in 1894.) was authorised by the Spalding and Bourn Railway Act 1862 (25 & 26 Vict. c. cxcix), also with capital of £100,000. This line was to make an end-on junction at Bourne with an offshoot of the GNR, the Bourn and Essendine Railway. The line was opened on 1 August 1866. It ran through practically unpopulated terrain. The GNR worked the line.

== Rivalry between the GNR and the GER ==
The Great Eastern Railway (GER) was formed on 7 August 1862, from the Eastern Counties Railway and other concerns. The GER made it clear, not least by bitter parliamentary struggles, to get authorisation for its own line or for running powers to get to Doncaster. Considerable quantities of coal were being brought south from the South Yorkshire Coalfield by the GNR, and the GER sought to take a share of the traffic. Fearing that this might happen, suddenly giving the GER a monopoly of the coal traffic to East Anglia, the GNR started to sponsor friendly railways in the area itself.

== Midland and Eastern Railway ==
Lynn and Sutton, Spalding and Bourn, and Norwich and Spalding Railways Act 1866
- Act of Parliament
- Parliament of the United Kingdom
- Long title: An Act to amalgamate the Lynn and Sutton Bridge and the Spalding and Bourn Railway Companies, and for a Lease of the Norwich and Spalding Railway to the amalgamated Company; and for other Purposes.
- Citation: 29 & 30 Vict. c. cclxv

Dates
- Royal assent: 23 July 1866

Text of statute as originally enacted

Midland and Eastern and Norwich and Spalding Railways Act 1867
- Act of Parliament
- Parliament of the United Kingdom
- Long title: An Act to confirm certain Agreements between the Midland Railway Company and the Great Northern Railway Company on the one hand, and the Midland and Eastern, the Norwich and Spalding, and the Stamford and Essendine Railway Companies on the other hand; and for other Purposes connected with the Undertakings of those Companies.
- Citation: 30 & 31 Vict. c. clxxxv

Dates
- Royal assent: 12 August 1867

Text of statute as originally enacted

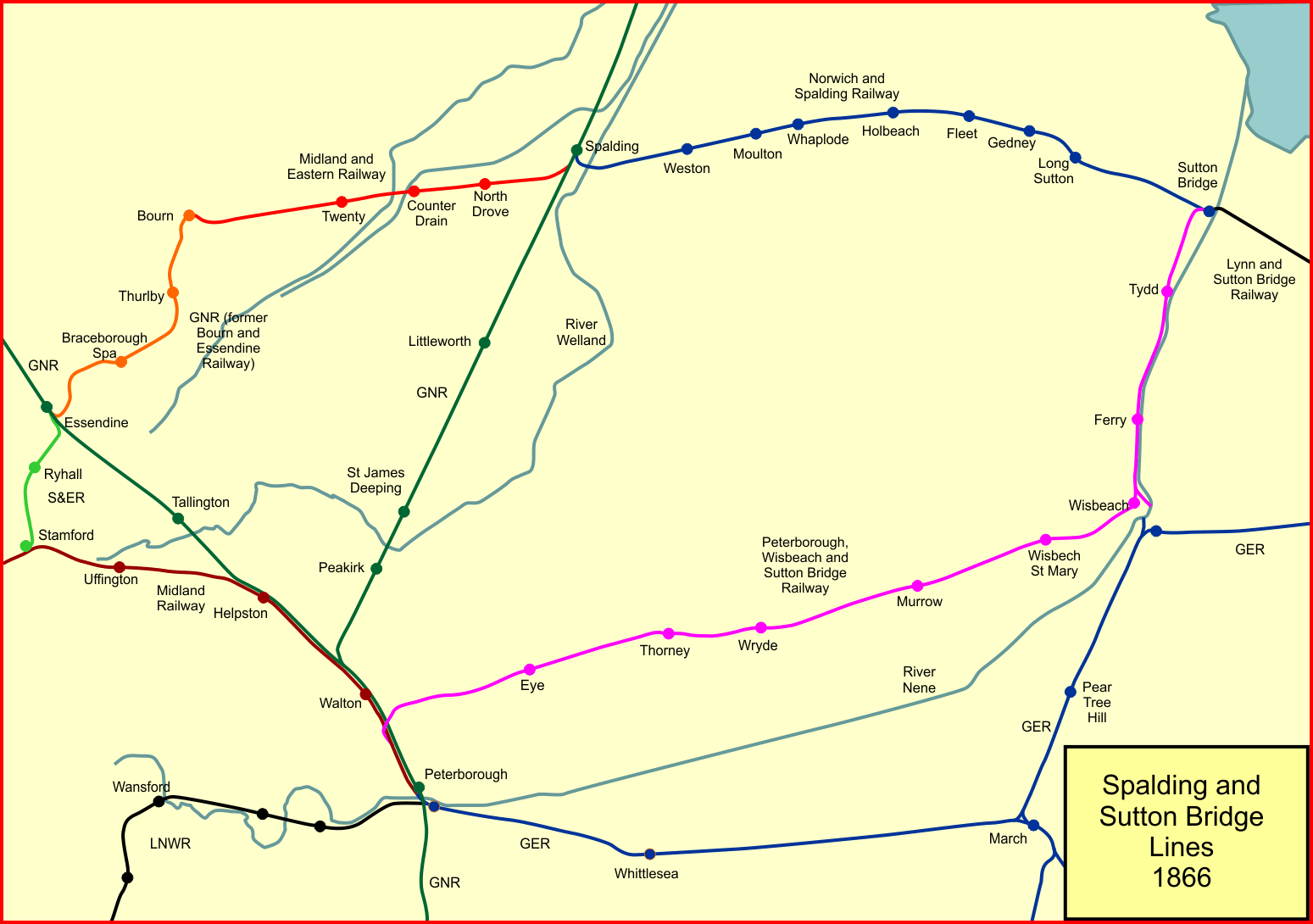
Spalding and Sutton Bridge railways in 1866

The Lynn and Sutton Bridge Railway and the Spalding and Bourn Railway amalgamated to form the Midland and Eastern Railway in 1866; the intention was to push westward to Saxby and join the Midland Railway there. This plan was opposed by the Great Northern Railway and the compromise was that the scheme was dropped, but that the Midland Railway was given running powers from over two GNR-sponsored lines: from Bourne to Essendine, and (by reversing there) from Essendine to Stamford; this was not a direct or fast route. The arrangement was agreed, and ratified by the Lynn and Sutton, Spalding and Bourn, and Norwich and Spalding Railways Act 1866 (29 & 30 Vict. c. cclxv) of 23 July 1866. The Midland and Eastern Railway was operated by the GNR and the Midland jointly, authorised by the Midland and Eastern and Norwich and Spalding Railways Act 1867 (30 & 31 Vict. c. clxxxv).

Midland and Eastern and Norwich and Spalding Railway Companies Amalgamation Act 1877
- Act of Parliament
- Parliament of the United Kingdom
- Long title: An Act for the Amalgamation of the Midland and Eastern and Norwich and Spalding Railway Companies; and for other purposes.
- Citation: 40 & 41 Vict. c. lxxxix

Dates
- Royal assent: 12 July 1877

Text of statute as originally enacted

The Midland and Eastern Railway leased the Norwich and Spalding line, but the N&SR remained nominally independent until the Midland and Eastern and Norwich and Spalding Railway Companies Amalgamation Act 1877 (40 & 41 Vict. c. lxxxix) took effect on 1 July 1877. It needed to go to Parliament to plead that it had, in good faith, tried to make a Sutton to Wisbech line, but had been prevented; and that the line had in fact been pre-empted by the PW&SR; this was accepted and the N&SR was released from the prohibition on declaring a dividend. The Midland and Eastern Railway now effectively controlled the whole of the western section of the future M&GNJR, except for the Peterborough to Sutton Bridge line, which was still controlled by the Midland Railway.

The Midland and Eastern was jointly owned by the GNR and the Midland Railway, but it operated more or less independently. The joint committee did not meet between 1867 and 1880; trains of the two owning companies ran their own trains on the lines. In this period the network was referred to as the Bourne and Lynn Joint Railway.

== GN and GE Joint Line ==
For several years the Great Eastern Railway had been trying to get access to northern districts, and had been frustrated by the Great Northern Railway's opposition. Nevertheless, the GER repeatedly presented bills for such lines, and the GNR calculated that it was only a matter of time until it was successful. This policy came to fruition in April 1878 during parliamentary hearings on a GER bill, and negotiations were set in place to establish what became the Great Northern and Great Eastern Joint Line, forming a through route from Doncaster to March via Lincoln.

The GNR and the Midland Railway had hitherto dominated the southward flow of Nottinghamshire and South Yorkshire coal, and saw that the dominance was vulnerable. This led the GNR and the Midland to look favourably at further development of the Bourne and Lynn Joint Railway (Midland and Eastern Railway).

== Sutton Bridge Dock failure ==
Sanction was obtained by an independent shipping company in the Sutton Bridge Dock Act 1875 (38 & 39 Vict. c. ccvii) to develop Sutton Dock. Wisbech had traditionally been used as an inland port, but a Sutton Bridge Dock, connected to the railway network, could be advantageous, saving part of the difficult navigation up the River Nene. The GNR subscribed £20,000, calculating that this could be an export point for coal. The dock opened on 14 May 1881, and a short branch railway had been constructed to serve it. The day after the opening it was observed that the lock gates were not watertight, and in fact a general failure of the wall of the dock took place. Ships that had entered the dock were got away, but repairs to the dock were said to be impracticable, and the dock was not used again; the GNR had by then expended £55,000 on an unusable dock system.

== In the east ==
=== Great Yarmouth and Stalham Light Railway ===
Great Yarmouth and Stalham (Light) Railway Act 1876
- Act of Parliament
- Parliament of the United Kingdom
- Long title: An Act for making a Railway from Great Yarmouth, in the County of Norfolk, to Stalham, in the same county; and for other purposes.
- Citation: 39 & 40 Vict. c. lxxxii

Dates
- Royal assent: 27 June 1876

Text of statute as originally enacted

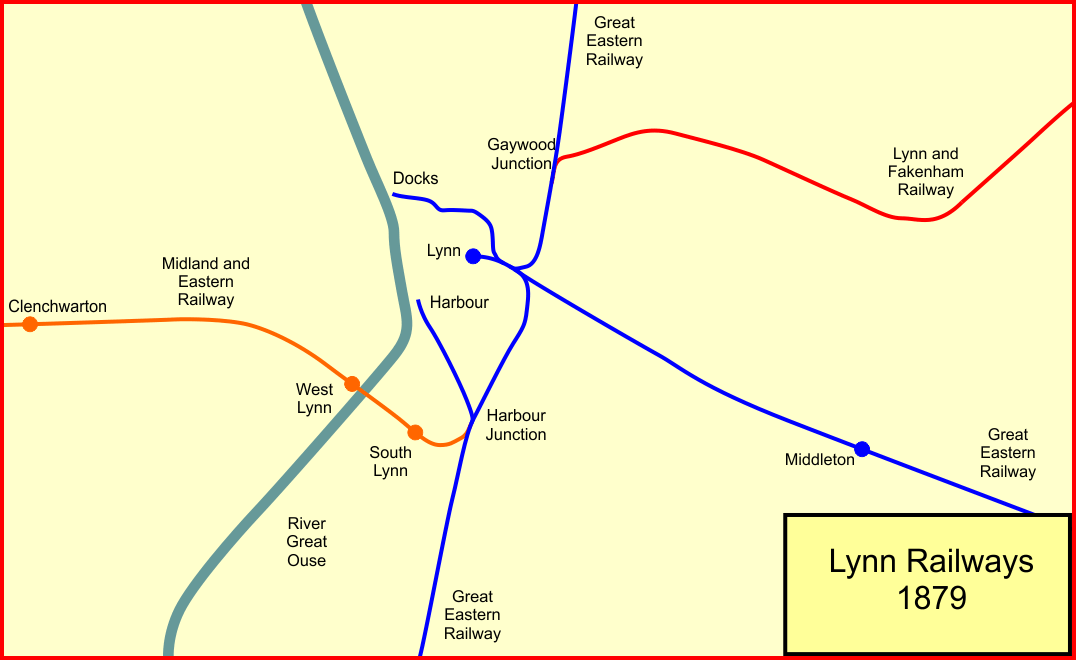
Railways around King's Lynn in 1879

Further east, it was not until 1876 that the first railway section of the future M&GNJR was approved by the Great Yarmouth and Stalham (Light) Railway Act 1876 (39 & 40 Vict. c. lxxxii): the Great Yarmouth and Stalham Light Railway (Note: This was before the era of the Light Railways Act 1896 (59 & 60 Vict. c. 48), which obviated the securing of an act of Parliament in some circumstances.) was authorised on 27 June 1876; (Note: Clark gives exhaustive details of enactment dates. Wrottesley gives 26 July 1876.) capital was £98,000. The line would run northwest for 16 miles (26 km); the Great Yarmouth terminal, later to be known as Yarmouth Beach, was well situated for holidaymakers, but at this stage there was no connection to other railways. The first section, to Ormesby, was opened on 7 August 1877.

Yarmouth and North Norfolk (Light) Railway Act 1879
- Act of Parliament
- Parliament of the United Kingdom
- Long title: An Act to confer further powers upon the Yarmouth and North Norfolk (Light) Railway Company.
- Citation: 42 & 43 Vict. c. lxxv

Dates
- Royal assent: 3 July 1879

Text of statute as originally enacted

From Ormesby to Hemsby opened on 16 May 1878, but there was a legal argument about a level crossing at Hemsby, and the next section to Martham opened from a temporary station north of the level crossing, on 15 July 1878. A temporary station south of the crossing was used from October. The legal position was resolved by the Yarmouth and North Norfolk (Light) Railway Act 1879 (42 & 43 Vict. c. lxxv) in July 1879 and the permanent Hemsby station opened, and the two temporary stations closed.

Yarmouth and North Norfolk (Light) Railway Act 1878
- Act of Parliament
- Parliament of the United Kingdom
- Long title: An Act to enable the Great Yarmouth and Stalham (Light) Railway Company to construct a new Railway and other works; and for other purposes.
- Citation: 41 & 42 Vict. c. xl

Dates
- Royal assent: 27 May 1878

Text of statute as originally enacted

Meanwhile, on 27 May 1878 the company got powers in the Yarmouth and North Norfolk (Light) Railway Act 1878 (41 & 42 Vict. c. xl) to extend to North Walsham, and to change its name to the Yarmouth and North Norfolk Light Railway, with additional capital of £60,000. Its status as a light railway was designed to prevent the Great Eastern Railway from acquiring running powers over the line. Successive openings took place: to Catfield on 17 January 1880 and on to Stalham on 3 July 1880.

=== Lynn and Fakenham Railway ===
Lynn and Fakenham Railway Act 1876
- Act of Parliament
- Parliament of the United Kingdom
- Long title: An Act to authorize the construction of Railways between King's Lynn and Fakenham in the County of Norfolk and for other Purposes connected with the said Undertaking.
- Citation: 39 & 40 Vict. c. cxlvi

Dates
- Royal assent: 13 July 1876

Text of statute as originally enacted

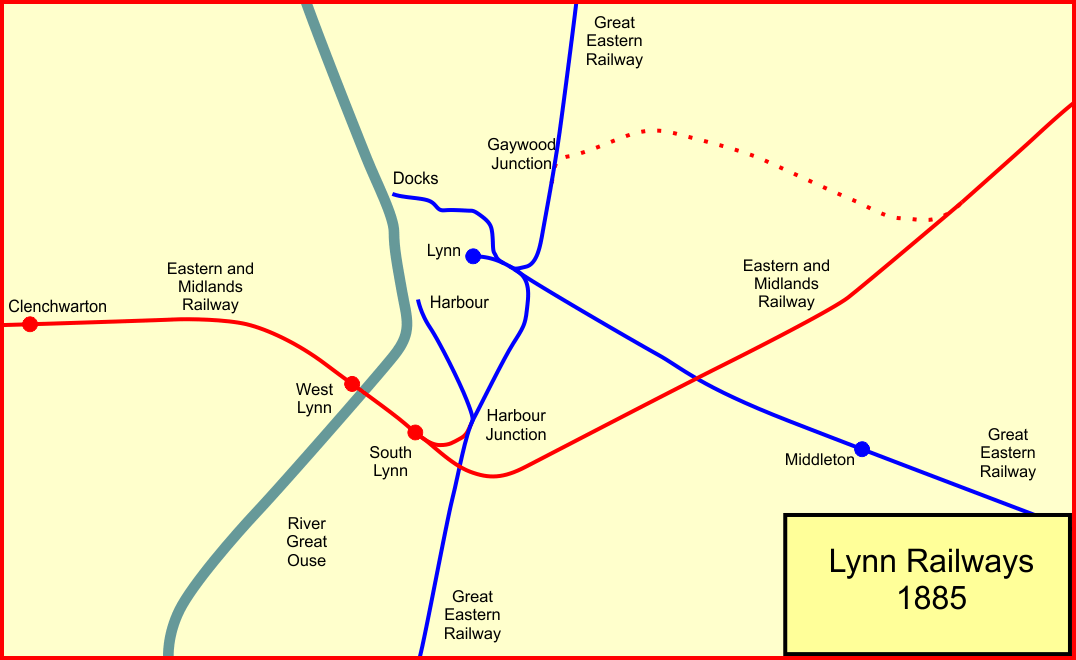
Railways around King's Lynn in 1885

On 13 July 1876 the Lynn and Fakenham Railway (L&FR) was authorised by an act of Parliament, the Lynn and Fakenham Railway Act 1876 (39 & 40 Vict. c. cxlvi), in the face of bitter opposition by GER interests. With capital of £150,000 it was to run from GER-influenced connections near King's Lynn to near Fakenham. Surprisingly, the GER made no attempt to take control of this line, in fact making obstructions to the construction process. It was opened to Massingham on 16 August 1879, extending to Fakenham on 16 August 1880.

Lynn and Fakenham Railway (Extensions) Act 1880
- Act of Parliament
- Parliament of the United Kingdom
- Long title: An Act to enable the Lynn and Fakenham Railway Company to extend their Railway to Norwich and Blakeney; and for other purposes.
- Citation: 43 & 44 Vict. c. clxv

Dates
- Royal assent: 12 August 1880

Text of statute as originally enacted

On 12 August 1880 the Lynn and Fakenham got approval in the Lynn and Fakenham Railway (Extensions) Act 1880 (43 & 44 Vict. c. clxv) to extend to Norwich, creating a much sought-after independent line to the city. The line was to pass through Melton Constable, and from that place there was to be a branch to Blakeney Harbour. On 11 August 1881 the Lynn and Fakenham and the Yarmouth and North Norfolk companies together managed at last to get powers to build from Melton Constable to North Walsham, which would connect their systems. In the same act the Lynn and Fakenham got powers to build from Kelling to Cromer (not actually built), and the Yarmouth and North Norfolk was converted from a light railway to a full system, avoiding the speed and weight restrictions imposed by light railway status. The L&FR opened from Fakenham to Guestwick on 19 January 1882, and from there to Lenwade on 1 July 1882. The final section to Norwich was opened on 2 December 1882. The Norwich station was named Norwich City from the outset. Melton to North Walsham was opened on 5 April 1883.

=== Yarmouth Union Railway ===
Yarmouth Union Railway Act 1880
- Act of Parliament
- Parliament of the United Kingdom
- Long title: An Act to incorporate a Company for the construction of the Yarmouth Union Railway; and for other purposes.
- Citation: 43 & 44 Vict. c. cxcv

Dates
- Royal assent: 26 August 1880

Text of statute as originally enacted

The Yarmouth Union Railway (YUR) was a short line, 1 mile 2 chains (1.65 km) long, was authorised by the Yarmouth Union Railway Act 1880 (43 & 44 Vict. c. cxcv) on 26 August 1880, to extend from the Yarmouth and North Norfolk station at Yarmouth Beach to the quay, where it became effectively a tramway, joining the GE tramway there (but not facilitating any through running between the two systems.) The capital was £20,000. The YUR itself was slow to start work, but with the assistance of the Yarmouth and North Norfolk the work was pushed forward and completed on 15 May 1882.

== Amalgamation: the Eastern and Midlands Railway ==
Eastern and Midlands Railway (Amalgamation) Act 1882
- Act of Parliament
- Parliament of the United Kingdom
- Long title: An Act to amalgamate the Lynn and Fakenham the Yarmouth and North Norfolk (Light) the Yarmouth Union the Midland and Eastern and the Peterborough Wisbeach and Sutton Railway Companies.
- Citation: 45 & 46 Vict. c. ccxxvii

Dates
- Royal assent: 18 August 1882

Text of statute as originally enacted

Now the many railway companies that were independent of the Great Eastern Railway saw that amalgamation with one another was desirable. On 18 August 1882 the Eastern and Midlands Railway (Amalgamation) Act 1882 (45 & 46 Vict. c. ccxxvii) was passed, which arranged that on the first day of 1883 the Eastern and Midlands Railway (Note: Midlands as opposed to Midland appears to be correct. Wrottesley uses Midlands consistently, as does Casserley on page 16, and Burgess in several places, and Carter on page 453. Awdry uses Midlands, page 125. Hopwood uses it However Rhodes uses Midland on page 12. Clark uses both in quick succession, quoting titles of acts: Midlands on page 21; both spellings on page 22; Midland on page 23.) was created by amalgamating the Lynn and Fakenham Railway, the Yarmouth and North Norfolk, and the Yarmouth Union Railway. Shares generally were transferred to E&MR stock, but some preference shareholders retained their rights. By the same act of Parliament a second stage arranged that the E&MR took over the Midland and Eastern Railway on 1 July 1883. The MR and GNR working arrangements were to continue on those affected routes, and the E&MR could only run trains on those section with the consent of those larger railways.

The whole line from Bourne to Great Yarmouth was now under the control of the Eastern and Midlands Railway. The train service at this stage was "lavish", with six trains daily on the South Lynn to Melton Constable section and seven from Melton to Norwich City, with numerous short workings. On Sundays it was made possible to spend the day in Great Yarmouth, by running several trains throughout or connecting in to those trains.

== Further openings ==
The section from Melton Constable to Holt was opened on 1 October 1884.

King's Lynn was an important regional centre and port on the Ouse, and the E&MR access to it was inconvenient, involving (from the east) reversal at the GER station for through trains, and reliance on that company's grudging acquiescence. Thoughts had long harboured the intention of creating an independent through route and on 2 November 1885 the Lynn Loop was opened for goods traffic; passenger service followed on 1 January 1886. The line ran south of Lynn, connecting from South Lynn goods station to Bawsey. The former connection from Gaywood Road Junction, north of King's Lynn, to Bawsey was closed. The railways had referred to the main station in King's Lynn simply as "Lynn" but from this time "Lynn Town" was used instead.

After a suspension of work, the Holt to Cromer section of line was completed by direct labour, and opened on 16 June 1887. A through London King's Cross to Cromer express started running in August 1887, and although the construction had been expensive, the boost to revenue from the new line was considerable. A second train was put on the following year, in the down direction consisting of coaches slipped at Peterborough from a GNR Manchester train. The time from King's Cross to Cromer via Peterborough was typically 4 1/2 hours, but the GER did London Liverpool Street to Cromer via Norwich in 3 1/2 hours.

At this time the decision was taken not to go ahead with the Blakeney Harbour branch from Kelling.

Eastern and Midlands Railway (Further Powers) Act 1888
- Act of Parliament
- Parliament of the United Kingdom
- Long title: An Act to enable the Eastern and Midlands Railway Company to abandon certain authorised railways and works to make a new railway and works and for other purposes.
- Citation: 51 & 52 Vict. c. lxvi

Dates
- Royal assent: 28 June 1888

Text of statute as originally enacted

On 20 June 1888 a new branch line from North Walsham to Mundesley, a small seaside resort was authorised by the Eastern and Midlands Railway (Further Powers) Act 1888 (51 & 52 Vict. c. lxvi).

== Relationships with the Midland and the GNR ==
For some years there had been continuing friction between the E&MR (and its predecessors) and the Midland Railway over the routing for goods traffic. The E&MR contended that the Midland was obliged to route its traffic to Norwich over the E&MR and not the GER, notwithstanding the inferior travel times. The Midland repeatedly protested at tribunals that no such obligation existed. Now at last a sudden rapprochement took place. A bill was to be submitted to the 1888 session of Parliament to build a connecting line from the Midland Railway near Ashwell (in the vicinity of Oakham) and Bourne. The E&MR was to build this with Midland financial help, and the following year the Midland would take over the entire western section. Traffic from the eastern section would be directed via the Midland.

At a stroke this would have cut the GNR out of much of the traffic, even though it had constantly been friendly and supportive of the E&MR when the Midland had treated it shabbily. This was "extraordinary conduct" by the E&MR. R. A. Read was a director, friendly to the Midland but prone to "rash and elaborate schemes", and Wrottesley attributes these schemes to him.

Eastern and Midlands Railway (Extension) Act 1888
- Act of Parliament
- Parliament of the United Kingdom
- Long title: An Act to enable the Eastern and Midlands Railway Company to make new Railways in the counties of Lincoln and Rutland and for other purposes.
- Citation: 51 & 52 Vict. c. lxv

Dates
- Royal assent: 28 June 1888

Text of statute as originally enacted

Nevertheless, the new line was sanctioned by the Eastern and Midlands Railway (Extension) Act 1888 (51 & 52 Vict. c. lxv) on 28 June 1888, although a junction to the GNR at Little Bytham was inserted to mollify the GNR.

In the months following the passage of the act, wiser counsels prevailed, and the E&MR, Midland and GNR boards negotiated a more congenial arrangement. The Midland and GNR would become joint owners of the western section; the eastern section would be unaffected for the time being. The route of the Bourne connecting line to the Midland would be varied, to meet the Midland at Saxby; the connection to the GNR main line at Little Bytham would be retained; and the connecting line west of that point would be Midland property, not E&MR. Ordinary shareholders in the E&MR would get £47 for every £100 worth. (Note: Wrottesley does not make it clear whether these are face value or market prices.) A joint committee met at King's Cross on 5 March 1889; it was a Midland and Great Northern Joint Committee, but at this stage no such designation was applied to the railway itself.

=== Eastern and Midlands Railway in chancery ===
At the moment when the future seemed satisfactory, the E&MR was plunged into crisis. For some years it had been paying only modest dividends, and profitability had not always been adequate to support outgoings. W. Jones had been hiring carriages to the company and for some time had not been paid. On 27 June 1889 he obtained judgment in his favour, but the company had no money to comply. At the time there was a system established since 1867 intended to keep a railway in operation for the convenience of the public in this situation: in effect to trade out of bankruptcy.

The "rash" R. A. Read was appointed receiver, and at a shareholders' meeting in November 1889 it was stated that the company had liabilities of over £108,000 on working costs as well as £71,645 on unpaid debenture interest and guaranteed share dividends. At a further meeting on 2 May 1890 the debenture holders accused Read of being to blame for getting the line into this situation, and demanded his removal, as well as a declaration that their debenture payments should rank equally with the railway operating costs, contrary to normal practice when a line was in receivership. Appeals were eventually dismissed and despite the legal and financial difficulties the railway kept running. It was not until 16 August 1892 that a scheme of financial arrangement was finalised.

=== Improvements despite the crisis ===
While this was continuing, some capital improvements took place, largely funded by the Midland Railway. Signalling was modernised, some additional crossing places were established as well as some short lengths of double track, and the Bourne to Saxby line continued to be built. On 25 July 1890 an avoiding line at Spalding was authorised, enabling through running past the south of the town. It opened for goods traffic on 5 June 1893, and on the same day the Saxby to Bourne section opened, also for goods only. On 28 June 1892 the Sutton Bridge was authorised to be renewed. It opened on 18 July 1897; it was a swing bridge, and carried road and rail traffic. There were tolls on the road part of the bridge, but these were given up in 1902.

The words Midland and Great Northern Joint Railway appeared in public timetables for the first time in 1890.

== The M&GNJR is formed ==
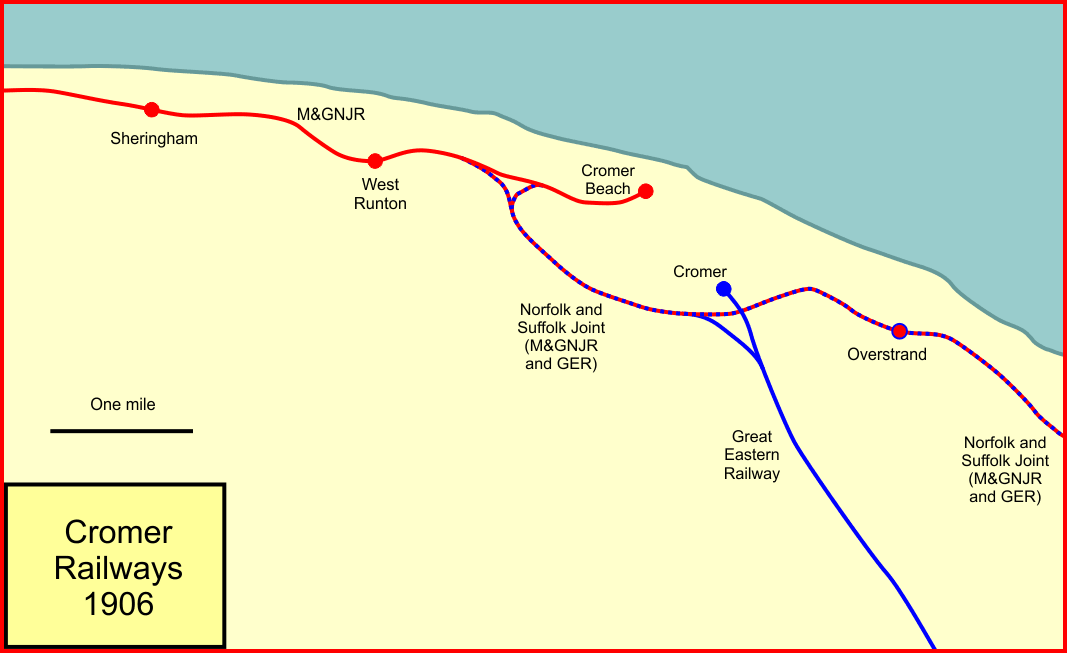
Railways around Cromer in 1906

The 1889 arrangement whereby the Midland and GNR jointly took over E&MR lines applied only to the western section. Now in 1891 the two larger companies indicated that they wished to acquire the eastern section too. This was agreed in October 1892, and a bill was submitted to the 1893 session of Parliament. The consideration was £1,200,000 of Midland and GNR 3% rent stock, although there were complicated provisions for preference and debenture shareholders. Both eastern and western sections transferred to the M&GNJR.

Midland and Great Northern Railways (Eastern and Midland Railway) Act 1893
- Act of Parliament
- Parliament of the United Kingdom
- Long title: An Act for vesting in the Midland and Great Northern Railway Companies the undertaking and powers of the Eastern and Midlands Railway Company and for other purposes.
- Citation: 56 & 57 Vict. c. lvii

Dates
- Royal assent: 9 June 1893

Text of statute as originally enacted

With only minor interference from the GER, the new arrangement passed as the Midland and Great Northern Railways (Eastern and Midland Railway) Act 1893 (56 & 57 Vict. c. lvii) on 9 June 1893: the Midland and Great Northern Joint Railway would become an incorporated entity (rather than just a committee delegated by the two principals). A total of 113 miles (182 km) of railway was involved, so that the M&GNJR network was the longest joint railway in the United Kingdom, by mileage.

== Further projects ==
=== Saxby and the Spalding avoiding line opened to passengers ===
On 1 May 1894 the Bourne to Saxby line was opened to passengers, with additional platforms at Saxby. The formation was made for a southward connecting curve there, but track was never laid on it. The boundary with the Joint Line was at Little Bytham as planned, and the formation of the connection to the GNR was also made, and here too track was never laid on it. The Spalding avoiding line was opened to passenger traffic on the same day, 1 May 1894.

=== Mundesley to Cromer ===
The Midland Railway Act 1896 (59 & 60 Vict. c. clxxxiii) of 7 August 1896 authorised the M&GNJR to build on from Mundesley (not yet open) to Cromer, passing south of the town and curving back to approach it from the west.

=== The Norfolk and Suffolk Joint Railway ===
Both the GER and the M&GNJR wanted to build a direct coastal line between Great Yarmouth and Lowestoft; the coastal area and Lowestoft itself were developing and offered the M&GNJR much potential. At the same time the GER wished to develop its access to Mundesley. Notwithstanding the friction between the two companies, a sensible accommodation was finalised on 18 March 1897 by which the GER bill for the Yarmouth to Lowestoft line and a Mundesley to Happisburgh line would not be opposed by the M&GNJR. The M&GNJR would simply build a connecting curve from its line swinging round the north and west of Yarmouth and connecting in to the new GER line, and have running powers to Lowestoft. A Norfolk and Suffolk Joint Railway company would be created, and would control the Yarmouth to Lowestoft line (from Gorleston), the North Walsham to Mundesley line, Mundesley to Cromer, and Mundesley to Happisburgh.

The Midland and Great Northern Joint Railway Bill for the curve at Yarmouth passed in Parliament on 6 August 1897, becoming the Midland and Great Northern Railways Joint Committee Act 1897 (60 & 61 Vict. c. clxxxii) and the establishment of the Norfolk and Suffolk Joint Railway (N&SJR) was enacted by the Great Eastern Railway and Midland and Great Northern Railways Joint Committee Act 1898 (61 & 62 Vict. c. cxx) on 25 July 1898. The Lowestoft line opened on 13 July 1903.

=== Opening to Mundesley ===
The Mundesley branch opened for goods traffic on 20 June 1898, and to passengers on 1 July 1898. As a joint line (from Antingham Road Junction) it had passenger trains of both companies: nine GER and seven M&GNJR daily. Goods services alternated month by month.

== From 1900 ==
In the first years of the 20th century the M&GNJR was doing well financially. Long-distance expresses were run to the area from northern English cities as well as from London. Restaurant cars were put on, as well as workers' trains, for example bringing fish-processing women from northern Scotland for seasonal work. Fish had become an important traffic since the N&SJR connection to Lowestoft had been established.

Although some short sections of double track had been introduced, the majority of the network was single line, and this brought challenges to timekeeping at busy times. The Midland and GNR were operating trains on the line as of right, and the GER had acquired running powers over several sections and to some terminal stations. Conversely the M&GNJR needed the cooperation of the GER for some penetrating workings, at a time when competition with the GER was still intense.

In May 1906 the committee approved introduction of the Whitaker tablet exchange apparatus. On single-track sections, head-on collision due to signalman error was prevented by a token system: drivers of trains entering a single line section must be in possession of a physical token, a "tablet" specific to that section, and one only could only be released from control equipment in the one or other of the two signalboxes controlling entry to the section. When the train had passed through the section the tablet was placed in the apparatus at that end of the section, and only now another might be released either there or at the other end of the section. When non-stopping trains passed the tablet had to be passed from the signalman to the fireman of the train, and this could not be done at speed without injury. Whitaker devised a mechanical apparatus to be placed at the lineside and on locomotives to enable the exchange at a higher speed.

During World War I many of the best long-distance express passenger trains were suspended; the M&GNJR took on considerable additional goods traffic during hostilities, and many of the workforce left for the armed forces. The company maintained an armoured train, constructed by the London and North Western Railway at Crewe, continuously in steam from early in 1915 in case of enemy invasion.

After 1918, government control of the railways continued, and much traffic in demobilised servicemen tested the capacity of the network. There was a general railway strike in the latter months of 1919, and a coal strike in 1921, both of which caused considerable damage to the M&GNJR. The national general strike took place in 1926.

== Grouping of the railways ==
Wartime control of the railways ended on 15 August 1921, and the government passed the Railways Act 1921, which had the effect of transferring most of the railways of Great Britain into one of four new large companies, in a process referred to as the "grouping". The Midland Railway was transferred to the new London, Midland and Scottish Railway (LMS), and the Great Northern Railway (as well as the Great Eastern Railway) were transferred to the new London and North Eastern Railway (LNER). The M&GNJR remained unchanged, now jointly owned by the LMS and LNER. The rivalry with the GER was naturally at an end. The change took place formally on 1 January 1923.

The long-distance express trains were reinstated progressively, and the LNER particularly emphasised London King's Cross to Cromer traffic. Holidays at the seaside increased in popularity very considerably after the war, and as well as trains to and from the area, local services for holidaymakers staying in the area were enhanced in the season.

However road competition, both for goods and passengers, began to take a serious toll as roads were improved. at the same time a general depression in the agricultural sector harmed M&GNJR income.

=== Incorporation into the LNER ===
The Midland and Great Northern Joint Railway had retained its identity at the grouping of the railways in 1923. In the mid-1930s there was good cooperation between the LMS and the LNER and in 1935 it was agreed that the LNER should manage the operational aspects of the M&GNJR system, though maintaining its independent identity. This took effect from 1 October 1936. The system consisted of 183 route miles (295 km), of which 40% was double track.

== World War II and after ==
In 1939 World War II started, and once again most long-distance expresses were suspended; staff were called up or volunteered in the services. However the focus of defence, evacuation of children, and later the D-day landings was the south coast, not the east. The war ended in 1945. The railways were run down during the war and the government passed the Transport Act 1947, so that the railways became nationalised at the beginning of 1948, forming British Railways (BR).

The long distance and holiday trains began to be restored, and holiday camp facilities became popular, and were served by the line.

=== Local closures ===
The very low usage of some parts of the M&GNJR system under BR could not be ignored, and some local closures started:

- On 6 April 1953 the Cromer Beach to Mundesley section (of the former Norfolk and Suffolk Joint Railway) was closed.
- On 21 September 1953 the Yarmouth Beach to Gorleston North section (of the Norfolk and Suffolk Joint railway) closed.
- The ex-GER station Cromer High was closed on 20 September 1954, services being concentrated on the M&GNJR station, Cromer Beach, which was extended and improved for the purpose.
- Eye Green, Thorney and Wryde stations closed to passengers in 1957 and North Drove closed to passengers in 1958.

=== Diesel trains ===
Diesel multiple unit vehicles were introduced on the M&GNJR from 18 September 1955, gradually taking over the entire passenger service except the long-distance trains which remained locomotive-hauled.

== Total closure ==
In May 1958 a report was finalised by British Railways. It concluded that the entirety of the M&GNJR was loss-making, and was largely duplicated by routes of the former GER. Complete closure of passenger services was proposed. Widespread closure of goods services too was contemplated, with only the Spalding to Sutton Bridge, Peterborough to Wisbech, South Lynn to Gayton Road, and Melton Constable to Norwich City being kept. Only the Melton to Cromer branch was to be unaffected by the proposals. The scale of the closure aroused considerable opposition, mainly focussed on the reduction in amenity to communities, although there was also widespread apathy, reflected in poor turnouts at public meetings.

After deliberation the Transport Users Consultative Committee issued its decision in November 1958, that the majority of the proposed closures should proceed. Retained sections were Spalding to Bourne for goods, Spalding to Sutton Bridge for goods. A new spur would be built at Murrow connecting the M&GNJR line with the GN&GE joint line; the Peterborough to Wisbech line would be disconnected at the Peterborough end, and served via the Murrow curve from Whitemoor, at March. Wisbech too would be retained and served from Whitemoor via Murrow. Further east the Melton Constable to Norwich line would remain open for goods trains, as would the South Lynn to Rudham line. Passenger trains would continue to operate between Melton Constable and Cromer, and between North Walsham and Mundesley. Yarmouth Vauxhall (the former GER station) would be extended to handle the additional seasonal passenger traffic.

The closures took place after the last trains on Saturday 28 February 1959. There was much greater public attention to the running of the last passenger trains than there had been to attending the public meetings, but the closure was decisive.

Notwithstanding the dire warnings of protesters, a substitute bus service operating from Melton Mowbray to Spalding following closely the route of the railway was almost completely lacking in patronage, and was soon given up.

The Melton Constable to Sheringham line had retained its passenger services for the time being; however that too closed to passengers after 4 April 1964. North Walsham to Mundesley closed on 5 October 1964.

The Spalding to Sutton Bridge goods connection closed after Friday 2 April 1965.

== Topography ==
=== Saxby to Sutton Bridge via Spalding ===
- Saxby; Midland Railway station;
- Little Bytham Junction; boundary point between Midland Railway and M&GNJR;
- Bourn; opened 16 May 1860; renamed Bourne between 1872 and 1893; closed 2 March 1959; convergence of line from Essendine; divergence of line to Spalding;
- Twenty; opened September 1866; closed 2 March 1959;
- Counter Drain; opened September 1866; closed 2 March 1959;
- North Drove; opened September 1866; closed 15 September 1958;
- Cuckoo Junction; divergence of avoiding line to Welland Junction;
- Spalding; Great Northern Railway station; opened 17 October 1848; M&GNJR route reverses here; divergence northward of GNR and GN&GE Joint lines;.
- Welland Bank Junction; convergence of avoiding line from Cuckoo Junction;
- Weston; opened 1 December 1858; closed 2 March 1959;
- Moulton; opened 15 November 1858; closed 2 March 1959;
- Whaplode; opened 1 December 1858; closed 2 March 1959;
- Holbeach; opened 15 November 1858; closed 2 March 1959;
- Fleet; opened 1 November 1862; closed 2 March 1959;
- Gedney; opened 1 July 1862; closed 2 March 1959;
- Long Sutton; opened 1 July 1862; closed 2 March 1959;
- Dock Junction; divergence of line to Docks;
- Sutton Bridge Junction; convergence of line from Peterborough;
- Sutton Bridge; first station Norwich and Spalding terminus opened 1 July 1862; Lynn and Sutton station opened 1 March 1866; closed 2 March 1959.

=== Peterborough to Sutton Bridge via Wisbech ===
- Peterborough; opened August 1850; originally Peterborough North; still open
- Peterborough Wisbech Junction; divergence from Midland Railway route;
- Dogsthorpe Brick Works;
- Eye; opened 1 August 1866; renamed Eye Green 1875; closed 2 December 1957;
- Thorney; opened 1 August 1866; closed 2 December 1957;
- Wryde; opened 1 August 1866; closed 2 December 1957;
- Murrow; opened 1 August 1866; renamed Murrow East 1948; closed 2 March 1959;
- Wisbech St Mary; opened 1 August 1866; closed 2 March 1959;
- Wisbeach; opened 1 August 1866; renamed Wisbech 1877; renamed Wisbech North 1948; closed 2 March 1959;
- Ferry; opened 1 August 1866; closed 2 March 1959;
- Tydd; opened 1 August 1866; closed 2 March 1959.
- Sutton Bridge Junction; above.

=== Sutton Bridge to Norwich via Melton Constable ===
- Sutton Bridge;
- Cross Keys; east end of swing bridge;
- Walpole; opened 1 March 1866; closed 2 March 1959;
- Terrington; opened 1 March 1866; closed 2 March 1959;
- Clenchwarton; opened 1 March 1866; closed 2 March 1959;
- West Lynn; opened 1 March 1866 closed 1886:
- South Lynn; opened 1 January 1886; closed 2 March 1959;
- South Lynn Junction; divergence of line to King's Lynn;
- Gayton Road; opened 1 July 1887; closed 2 March 1959;
- Grimston Road; opened 16 August 1879; closed 2 March 1959;
- Hillington; opened 16 August 1879; closed 2 March 1959;
- Massingham; opened 16 August 1879; closed 2 March 1959;
- Rudham; opened 16 August 1880; renamed East Rudham 1 March 1882; closed 2 March 1959;
- Raynham Park; opened 16 August 1880; closed 2 March 1959;
- Fakenham Town; opened 16 August 1880; renamed Fakenham West 27 September 1948; closed 2 March 1959;
- Thursford; opened 19 January 1882; closed 2 March 1959;
- Melton Constable; opened 19 January 1882; closed 6 April 1964; convergence of line from Cromer; divergence of line to Yarmouth;
- Hindolvestone; opened 19 January 1882; closed 2 March 1959;
- Guestwick; opened 19 January 1882; closed 2 March 1959;
- Whitwell & Reepham; opened 1 July 1882; closed 2 March 1959;
- Lenwade; opened 1 July 1882; closed 2 March 1959;
- Attlebridge; opened 2 December 1882; closed 2 March 1959;
- Costessey & Drayton; opened 2 December 1882; renamed Drayton 1 February 1883; closed 2 March 1959;
- Hellesdon; opened 2 December 1882; closed 15 September 1952;
- Norwich City; opened 2 December 1882; closed 2 March 1959.

=== Melton Constable to Cromer ===
- Melton Constable; above;
- Holt; opened 1 October 1884; closed 6 April 1964;
- Weybourne; opened 1 July 1901; closed 6 April 1964;
- Sherringham; opened 16 June 1887; renamed Sheringham 1897; M&GNJR station closed in 1967 when new resited station opened, now part of the Bittern Line
- West Runton; opened September 1887; still open as part of the Bittern Line;
- Runton West Junction; divergence of line to North Walsham;
- Runton East Junction; convergence of line from North Walsham and later the Bittern Line from Norwich (via ex-GER route);
- Cromer Beach; opened 16 June 1887; expanded and renamed Cromer 1969; still open as part of the Bittern Line.

=== Melton Constable to Great Yarmouth ===
- Melton Constable; above;
- Corpusty and Saxthorpe; opened 5 April 1883; closed 2 March 1959;
- Bluestone; opened 5 April 1883; closed 1 March 1916;
- Aylsham Town; opened 5 April 1883; simply Aylsham 1902 – 1910; Aylsham North from 1948; closed 2 March 1959;
- Felmingham; opened 5 April 1883; closed 2 March 1959;
- North Walsham; opened 13 June 1881; renamed North Walsham Town 27 September 1948; closed 2 March 1959;
- Honing; opened August 1882; closed 2 March 1959;
- Stalham; opened 3 July 1880; closed 2 March 1959;
- Sutton Staithe Halt; opened 17 July 1933; closed 8 July 1935;
- Catfield; opened 17 January 1880; closed 2 March 1959;
- Potter Heigham; opened 17 January 1880; closed 2 March 1959;
- Potter Heigham Bridge Halt; opened 17 July 1933; closed September 1939; reopened June 1948; closed 27 September 1958;
- Martham; opened 15 July 1878; closed 2 March 1959;
- Hemsby; opened 16 May 1878; closed 2 March 1959; a temporary station to north opened 15 July 1878; temporary station to south opened October 1878; temporary stations closed July 1879;
- Little Ormesby Halt; opened 17 July 1933; closed 8 July 1935
- Ormesby; opened 7 August 1877; renamed Great Ormesby 21 January 1884; closed 2 March 1959;
- Scratby Halt; opened 17 July 1933; closed September 1939; reopened June 1948; closed 2 March 1959;
- California Halt; summer service only; opened 17 July 1933; closed September 1939; reopened June 1948; closed 28 September 1958;
- Caister Camp Halt; summer service only; opened 17 July 1933; closed September 1939; reopened June 1948; closed 28 September 1958;
- Caister; opened 7 August 1877; renamed Caister-on-Sea 1 January 1893; closed 2 March 1959;
- Newtown Halt; opened 17 July 1933; closed September 1939; reopened June 1948; closed 2 March 1959;
- Yarmouth; opened 7 August 1877; renamed Yarmouth Beach 1883; closed 2 March 1959.

== Key people ==
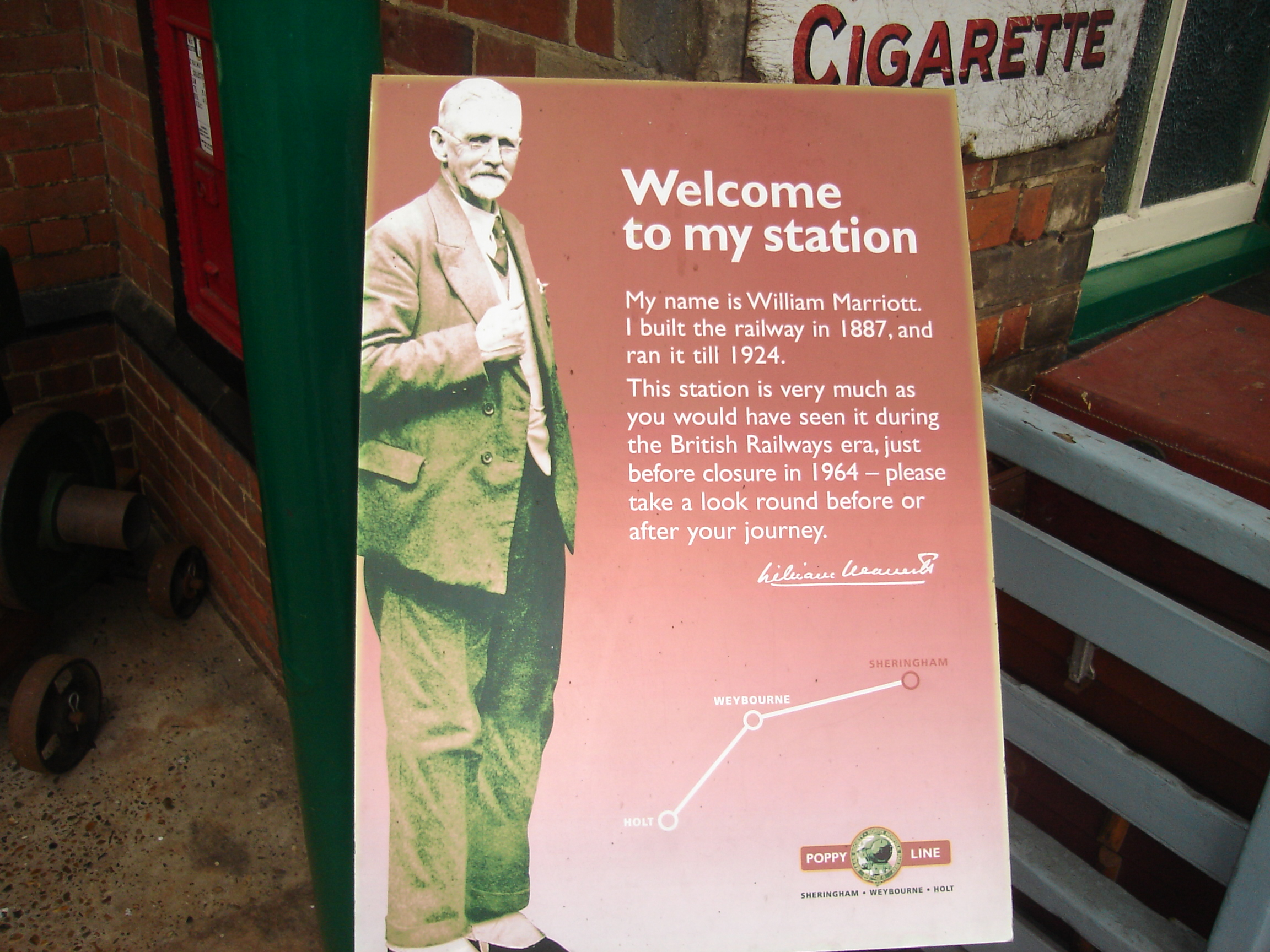
William Marriott

For over 40 years William Marriott served the M&GNJR and its predecessors, joining the staff of the original contractors, Wilkinson and Jarvis in 1881, serving as Engineer from 1883, Locomotive Superintendent from 1884 and finally becoming Traffic Manager as well in 1919, before retiring in 1924. He is commemorated in the name of the Marriott's Way footpath, much of which follows the trackbed of the M&GNJR Norwich line, and in the work of the North Norfolk Railway

== Murrow flat crossing ==
At Murrow the M&GNJR crossed the GN&GE joint Line on the level, one of few such crossings in the UK, and the only one where two joint lines crossed.

== Locomotives ==
Because of the relatively early closure date, most workings throughout the life of the M&GNJR were operated by steam power. A small number of diesel multiple unit services were run in the final years, alongside the very occasional incursions of early diesel locomotives.

The M&GNJR mainly used designs from the MR and GNR, but included in its stock some of the older E&M engines, often much rebuilt. The famous Beyer-Peacock engines survived in this way from the early 1880s to the mid-1930s. The best contemporary designs were acquired by the Joint in the 1893 – 1901 period, but as there were no more modern engines forthcoming, the light 0-6-0s and 4-4-0s provided much of the motive power on the line until 1936. From then on the LNER tried various designs on the line, not necessarily bigger or even more recent than the Joint's own engines, but as the M&GNJR's engines were scrapped, newer engines such as the K2 2-6-0s and B12 4-6-0s became common. The ex-GER D16 "Claud Hamilton" 4-4-0s provided the locomotive backbone of this later period.

From the 1950s, Ivatt 4MTs became the dominant motive power on the system, which achieved a higher degree of standardisation than any other part of British Railways—more than 50 of these "mucky ducks" were allocated here. But there were other types still in use, and among them the line saw Ivatt 2MTs and occasional Standard 4MT and LNER B1 and B17 types.

British Railways' Eastern Region was an early adopter of diesel motive power and the M&GNJR lines were used by Brush Type 2 locomotives and several early DMU types including Class 101 and Class 105s. A fleet of the latter was commissioned in the mid-1950s to take over all the long-distance locomotive-hauled passenger services, but the line's closure in 1959 saw them re-allocated (especially to the Great Northern suburban commuter workings out of King's Cross, for which they were particularly unsuitable). One M&GNJR boiler from a Hudswell Clarke 4-4-0T survives, it is hoped this will be rebuilt as a static exhibit.

=== Badge and livery ===
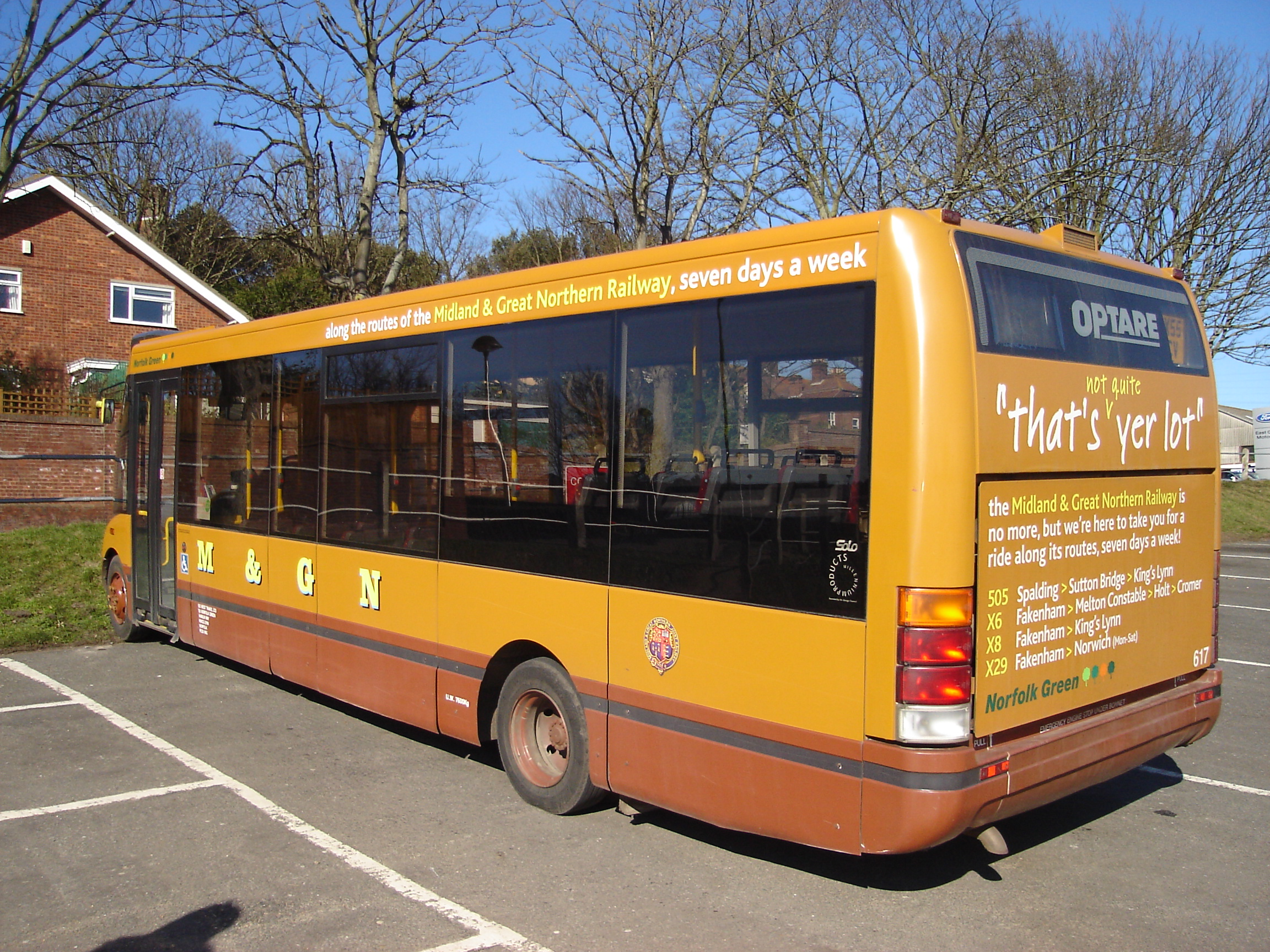
Norfolk Green bus painted in the M&GNJR livery

The M&GNJR device consists of images derived from the coats of arms of the four principal cities and towns it served: (clockwise from top left) Peterborough, Norwich, Great Yarmouth and King's Lynn.

For much of the company's life the locomotives were painted a light golden brown, often referred to by paintshop staff as "autumn leaf" or "golden ochre". From 1922 the goods engines were painted dark brown, followed by the rest of the locomotives in 1929. The LNER painted the survivors black. Most of the carriages were ex-GNR and were varnished teak, but some of the older stock and rebuilds were painted and grained to look like teak. Wagon stock was generally brown oxide, the same colour as the GNR used, until 1917 when general stock under the common user agreement began to be painted grey. The number of M&GNJR wagons declined during the 1920s, and were eventually bought by the parent companies in 1928, leaving only service stock, which was painted red oxide. Under British Railways' control, carriages were often carmine and cream, then maroon.

== Cultural impact and heritage ==
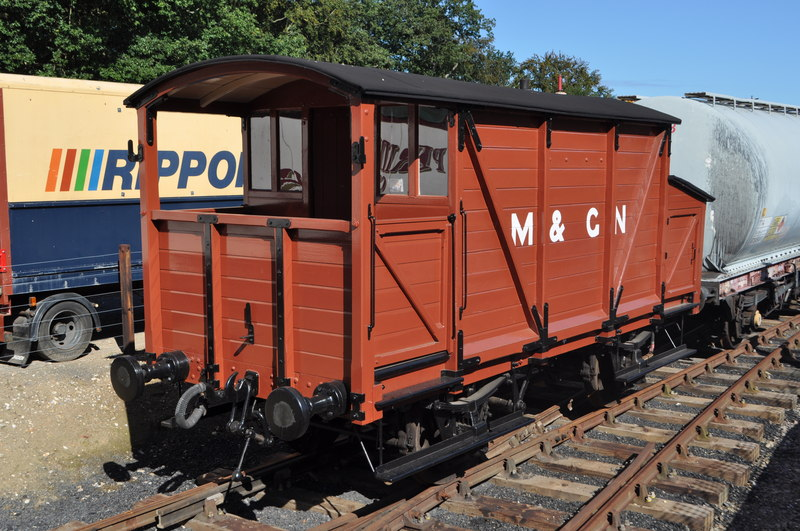
Preserved brake van No. 12 restored and in operation on the NNR.

The M&GNJR was frequently referred to as the "Muddle and Go Nowhere", a fairly self-evident title for a route that served a mostly rural region, but after closure this phrase was commonly replaced with "Missed and Greatly Needed".

The M&GNJR's memory is kept alive by two heritage railway operations and railway museums. Whilst only the short section between Cromer Beach and Sheringham remains open to regular services, the section of branch line between Sheringham and Holt is operated as the North Norfolk Railway. The station at Whitwell also operates as a heritage centre, with ambitions to restore a section of the M&GNJR main line. There is also a group dedicated to the study of the line: the M&GN Circle.

M&GNJR signal boxes survive at numerous locations, with Cromer Beach box being open to the public. The box from Honing also survives at the Barton House Railway near Wroxham.

The turntable from Bourne engine shed has also survived. This turntable was built in Ipswich in 1933 and installed at Bourne. When the shed closed along with the line in 1959 it was transferred to Peterborough East railway station. After that shed closed the turntable was rebuilt at Wansford station on the Nene Valley railway

Very little rolling stock from the line has been preserved. The North Norfolk Railway have rescued a brake van. Another M&GNJR brake van survives, No. 23 which was built in 1899, was rescued from Melton Constable in 2000. Two M&GNJR coaches survive, both at Eccles on Sea. No locomotives survived, with the last complete locomotive being scrapped at the Longmoor Military Railway in 1953. However, the Boiler of an M&GN Class C survives after being discovered at a Sawmill in the 1980s.

The "golden ochre" livery has been carried by two industrial locomotives on the North Norfolk Railway, and was later worn by a bus operated by Norfolk Green on routes formerly served by the company.
