= Holt railway station =

Former railway station in Norfolk, England

Holt
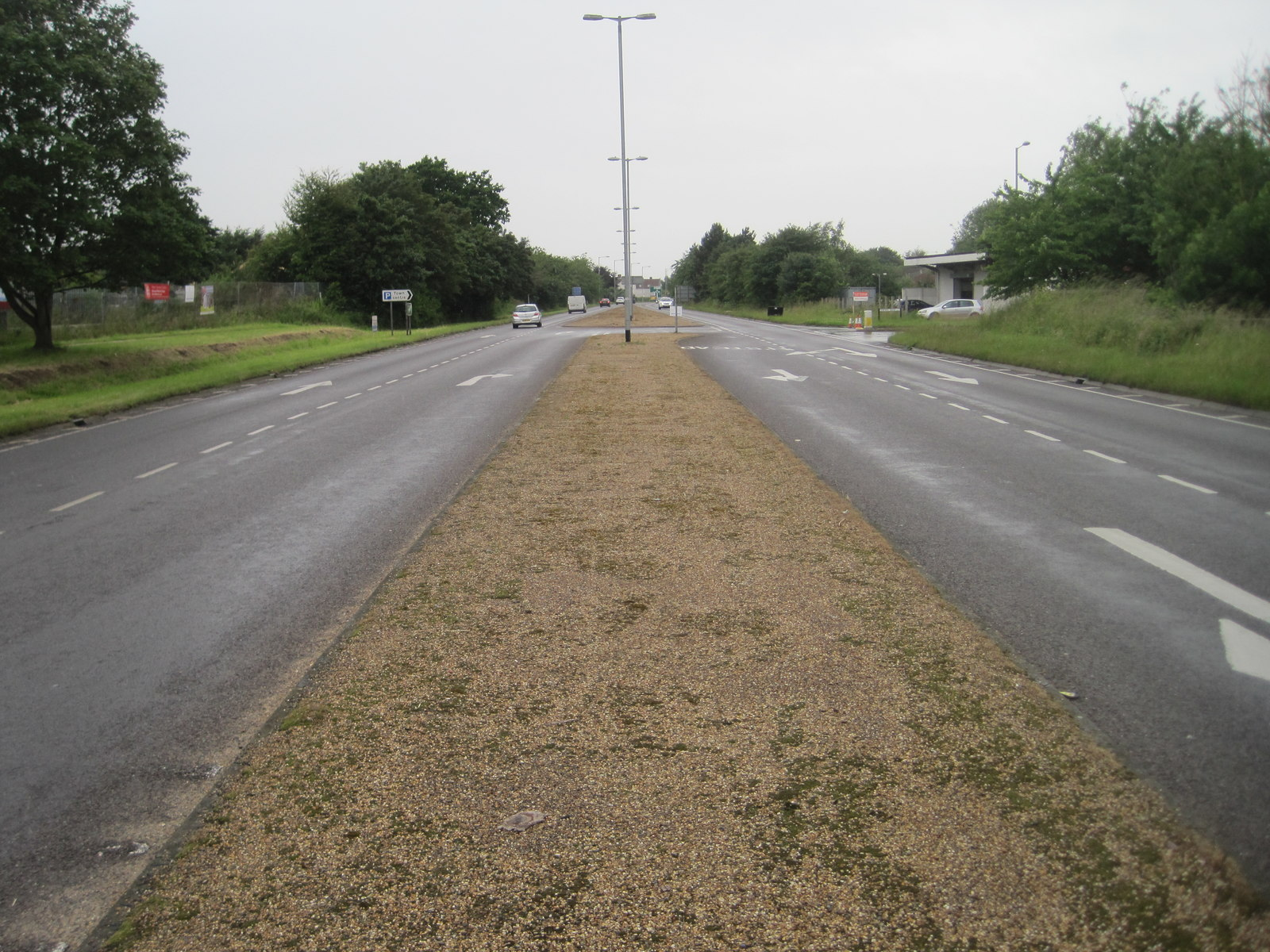
- Site of Holt's original railway station

General information
- Location: Holt, North Norfolk; England
- Coordinates: 52.904195°N 1.094488°E
- Grid reference: TG082385
- Platforms: 2

Other information
- Status: Disused

History
- Pre-grouping: Eastern & Midlands Railway; Midland and Great Northern Joint Railway
- Post-grouping: Midland and Great Northern Joint Railway; Eastern Region of British Railways

Key dates
- 1 October 1884: Opened
- 6 April 1964: Closed to passengers
- 28 December 1964: Closed to freight
Location

Holt railway station served the town of Holt in Norfolk, England. It was part of the Midland and Great Northern Joint Railway network, which spread over much of East Anglia, providing connections to Cromer, Norwich and Yarmouth. The station was closed in 1964 and the site is now occupied by a main road. There are proposals to rebuild the line through the town, as part of an orbital railway scheme, and possibly a new station to serve the town.

== History ==
=== Construction ===
In 1880 and 1881, the Lynn & Fakenham Railway obtained successive Acts of Parliament authorising the construction of a line north from its Melton Constable station as far as Kelling Heath where it would fork: one branch heading to the north-west to reach the fishing port of Blakeney, whilst the second would proceed to the north-east to reach the coastal village of Sheringham and then Cromer. A new company – the Eastern & Midlands Railway – was formed to build the line. Construction began in April 1883 and later that year the rails had reached Holt, five miles from Melton Constable, but work on the station and yard did not begin until much later. Holt was to remain the line's northern terminus and only station until 1887 when it finally reached Cromer. The line to Blakeney was never built due to doubts over its viability.

=== Station building ===
The original 1884 building consisted of little more than a sleeper platform and basic wooden buildings. Upon the completion of the line to Cromer, more durable buildings – most likely designed by William Marriott – were built; these included a brick-built main station building of typical Midland and Great Northern (M&GN) design, with a central block and two projecting gabled cross wings – the central portion being set back slightly to form a loggia for passengers on the down platform. A wooden waiting shelter was erected on the up platform with a saw-tooth canopy. The original wooden station building later became a 'reading room' at Melton Constable station. Holt station was destroyed by fire in 1926 and a concrete replacement was built.

=== Decline and closure ===
When most of the former M&GN railway lines were closed in 1959, the branch through Holt remained open until 1964.

Following closure of the line between Melton Constable and Sheringham, the station buildings at Holt were demolished and part of the trackbed was subsequently reused to construct part of the A148 Holt bypass. In 1965 a company known as Central Norfolk Enterprises (which changed its name to the North Norfolk Railway (NNR)) attempted to purchase the trackbed, but was rebuffed by Norfolk County Council which wished to proceed with the road scheme. The NNR did manage to restore the line between Sheringham and Weybourne and, in 1987, opened a replacement Holt station on the edge of the town. The NNR also salvaged Holt's original signal box which was relocated to Weybourne.

== Present and future ==
The proposed Norfolk Orbital Railway could provide Holt with a regular railway service again. It would link Sheringham and Wymondham together, using the existing lines of the North Norfolk Railway (NNR) and the Mid Norfolk Railway, laying some new connecting track onto old track-beds.

The project is facilitated by the fact that reinstatement through Holt remains technically possible, as the A148 bypass was built to leave sufficient width alongside it to enable a single-track railway line to be constructed. The scheme therefore proposes a new route running from the NNR's Holt station, crossing the A148 on the level before running alongside the road to the site of the original Holt station, where a very basic station would be provided. From there, it would continue in a cutting, running beneath Station Road and Norwich Road, before rejoining the line's original alignment to reach Melton Constable.

== See also ==
- List of closed railway stations in Norfolk
- Holt railway station (North Norfolk Railway)
- Blakeney

== Bibliography ==
- Jenkins, Stanley C. (1991). The Melton Constable to Cromer Branch. Headington, Oxford: The Oakwood Press. ISBN 0-85361-419-9.

Preceding station	Disused railways	Following station
Weybourne; Line closed, station open	Midland and Great Northern; Cromer Branch	Melton Constable; Line and station closed
	Future services	
Weybourne; Line closed, station open	Norfolk Orbital Railway	Melton Constable; Line and station closed
