= Melton Constable Railway Works =

Railway maintenance facility in Norfolk, England

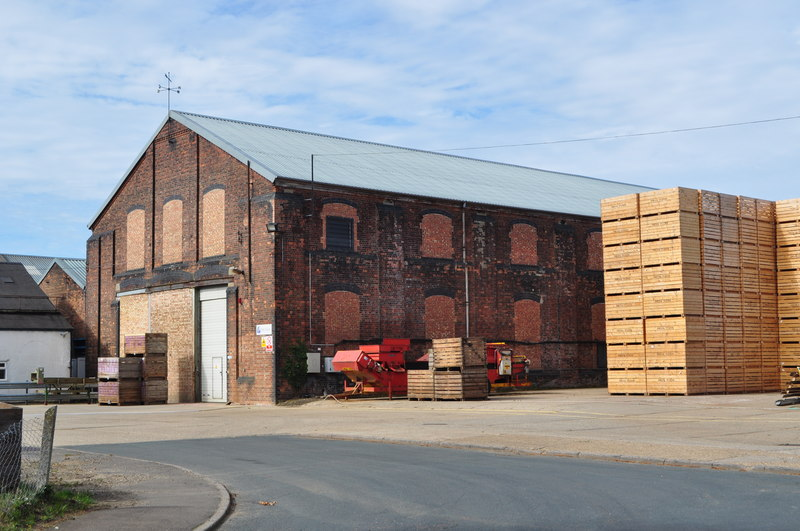
Recent view of the erecting shop

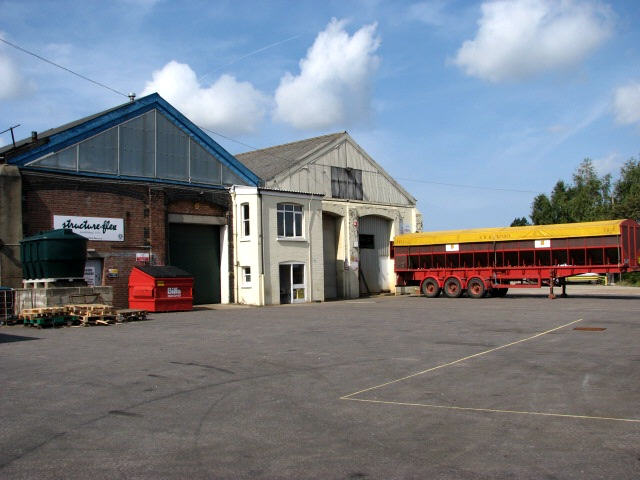
Recent view of the longshops

Melton Constable railway works was a railway maintenance and production facility on the Midland and Great Northern Railway. The buildings and operations in the village of Melton Constable from 1883 to 1964 were vital to the village economy and indeed it is known that the village itself was created to house the employees who worked there. The works are known by many as the 'Crewe of North Norfolk' as Crewe was similar to Melton Constable, although on a much larger scale. Since the loss of the works and rail links the village has never recovered to pre World War I levels.

== History ==
=== Opening ===
The first rail presence at the site was in January 1882 when the Lynn & Fakenham Railway began services to King's Lynn. Later in the year, the line to North Walsham was opened (linking King's Lynn with Great Yarmouth). William Marriott noted in his reminiscences that he had given up on the thought of going to America because he was offered a permanent post and salary to stay with the contractors Messrs Wilkinson & Jarvis. William first visited the works when the foundations had been laid. He also noted the framework for the houses in Melton Street were up. In December 1882 the Norwich line was opened. The growth of this new network was rapid. The buildings are known to have opened in 1883. As a result, the works grew to employ over 1000 people and the village population grew from 118 in 1881 to 1,157 in 1911. The smaller railway companies combined to form the Eastern and Midlands railway in 1883. Later the line to Cromer Beach opened in 1887. The result was that Melton Constable, a small village that began as a parish with 19 houses, became a junction of four new railways lines connecting Norfolk, Lincolnshire and Cambridgeshire. The facilities grew to cover 14 acres (57,000 m^{2}) that were once farmland. The site included an erecting shop along with this two long 'workshops'. There was an iron foundry, gasworks for the village, drawing offices and accommodation. The site was also served by a small miniature railway like the one at Horwich and Crewe.

=== The Midland and Great Northern Joint Railway ===
The formation of the M&GN was in 1893. There was also a wooden engine shed and turntable next to Melton Constable railway station. Activities carried out included maintenance of rolling stock and locomotives, however 19 locomotives were constructed there and many wagons were too. The Midland Railway and the Great Northern Railway were the shareholders in the joint railway. The GNR looked after the track and buildings, while the MR sorted locomotives and rolling stock. This resulted in maintenance of the 'hand me downs' as main activity. This old rolling stock would have had repairs and renovations in the Melton shops. The concrete production is the most famous export from Melton Constable. Many concrete items of railway furniture and even station buildings were made at the concrete division there.

Another role was the cutting up of old locomotives. Often the old types of engine were gas axed near the foundry.

The plant and stores were used and attacked in both world wars.

=== LNER ownership ===
In 1923-4 the M&GN was passed over to the London and North Eastern Railway and the London, Midland and Scottish Railway (LMS). The LNER had taken over the GNR and the LMS the Midland part. At one time, the LMS was the biggest commercial operation in the Empire and second largest employer in Britain. Operation was as before with the M&GN remaining much like the M&GN had always run since 1924. However, in 1936 the LNER wholly took ownership of the M&GN system, and closed the works as the LNER had major works at Doncaster and Stratford which contained more modern machines and skills, so the amount of work the plant did was vastly decreased. Employees were relocated to Stratford and Doncaster. The village never recovered from the economic disaster, as the works was the major employer. However, the works did not close completely and visually change little, with simple repairs still being conducted there.

=== British Railways ===
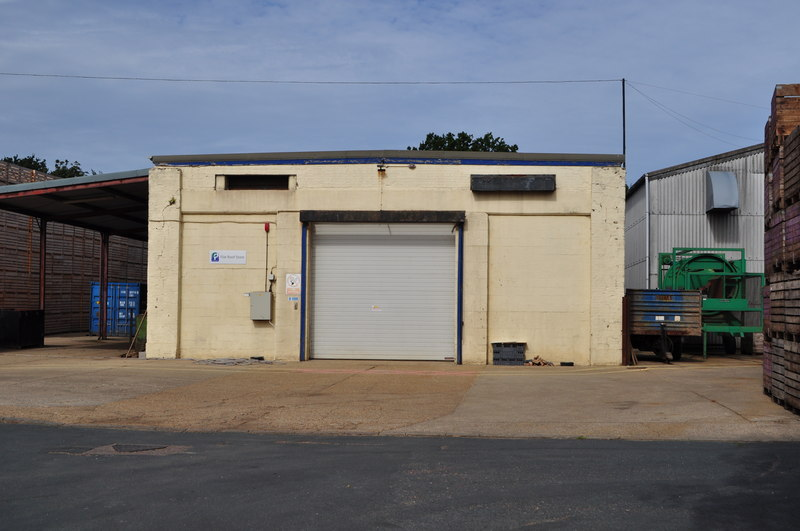
The 1951 engine shed

The main work for the rest of its life was wagon sheet production. This carried on right up into ownership by British Railways. This ownership take over was on 1 January 1948. At first, BR was kind to the works. A new engine shed was built in 1951 on the site of the wooden one. This building could hold 12 engines. Like any other railway motive power depot or works site, Melton Constable used stationary boilers to raise steam needed for machinery. It was noted that old J15 locomotives were used for this duty. In the late 1950s most of the former M&GN was closed and lifted, the line from Sheringham to Melton Constable surviving until the Beeching Axe of 1964. This is when the works closed completely to railway work. The station was demolished in the 1970s along with the turntable. The main buildings were converted to an industrial estate.

- Picture of the Yard in the late 1950s
- Picture of the Engine shed in the late 1950s

== The World Wars ==
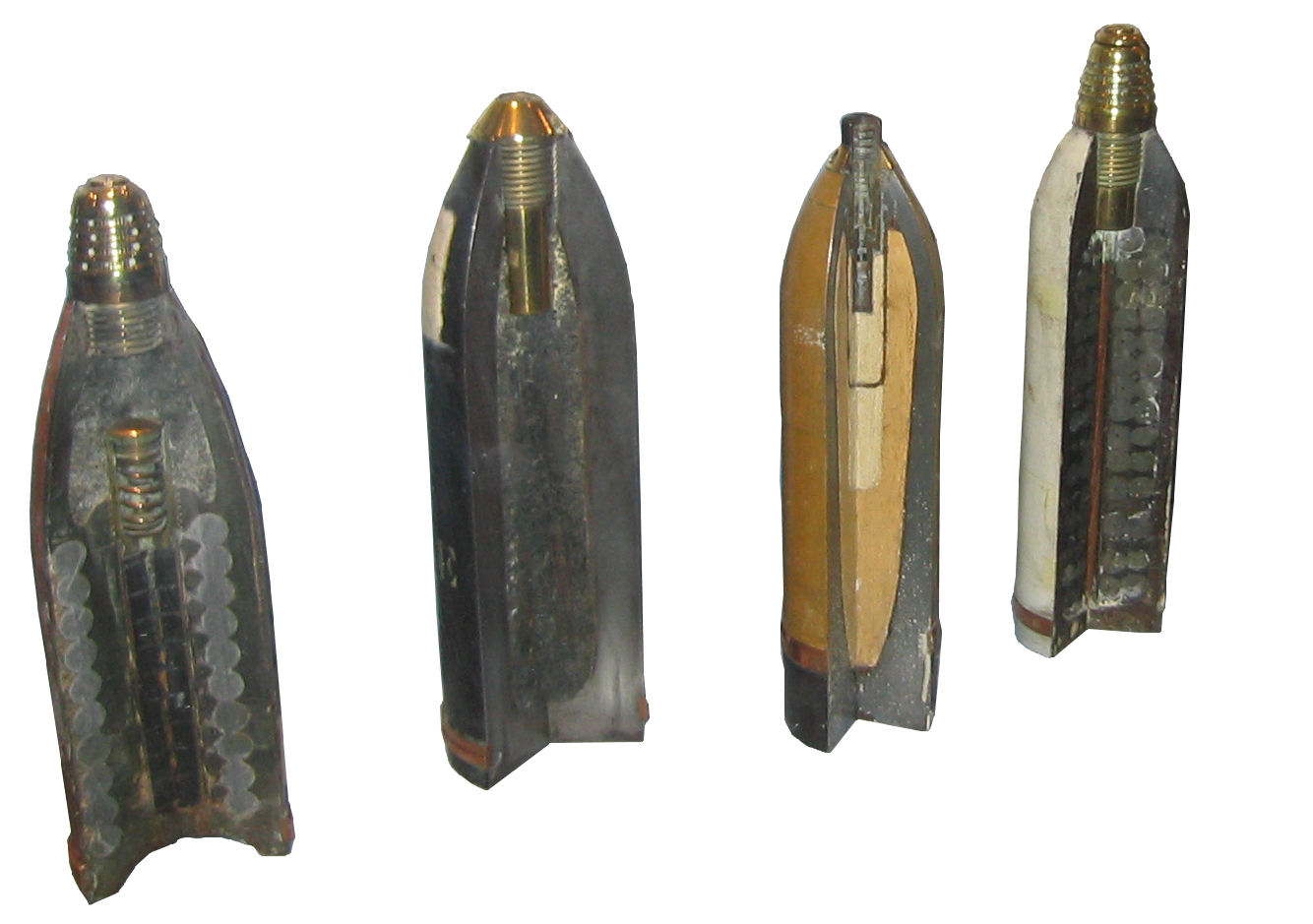
Some sectioned shells from the First World War

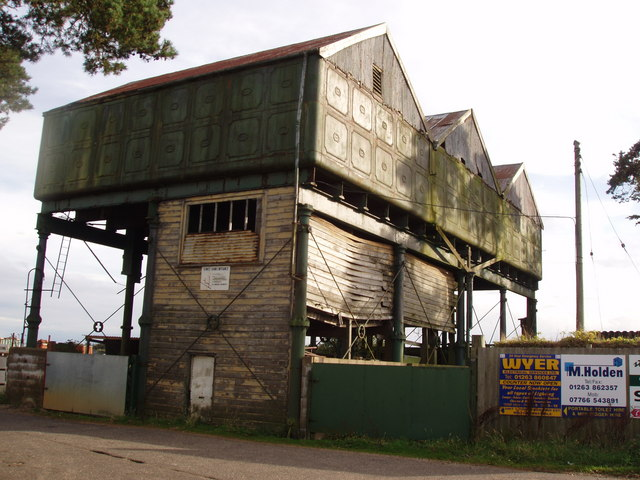
The water tower that is war damaged

In 1914 World War I was declared and along with other railway works Melton was required to contribute to the war effort. There was increased maintenance due to extra use of the track and rolling stock, also the shops where put into shell production (30000 HE9 of shell noses and thousands of base rectification plates). William Marriott (Chief Engineer and manager of the M&GN) noted that troop traffic was heavy and in some instances over 20 trains went through Melton Constable in one day. As the railway was in M&GN ownership it was agreed that Melton would do the maintenance for the parent companies while their workshops did more war work. This was because of the better machines, skills and capacity.

Marriott noted repairing 70 Midland Railway locomotives and building 14 rail wagons, 30 ballast wagons, 30 goods vehicles on top of repairing 500 ordinary wagons for the GNR. Other work included producing light railway turnouts. The war also meant Melton Constable becoming a German target. The production often went well into the night, resulting in them being well lit. Vast sums were spent on roof blinds to protect from Zeppelin raids. The water tower at the back of the site has repair work from damage caused from bombs that hit the area. There would often be raids three nights running as in 1915 East Anglia was hit badly. Damage was done in Sheringham and Great Yarmouth.

The war also affected Marriott himself; he lost his youngest son (of 3) along with some M&GN drivers.

The Second World War was from 1939 to 1945, so most of the importance has dropped. There probably would have been an increase in wagon sheet production. It is thought that there is also damage again on the water tower at the back of the site.

== Locomotive repair and production ==
19 locomotives were built at Melton Constable; nine were 0-6-0Ts, three were 4-4-2Ts. Some were William Marriott's design. The biggest work was locomotive repair. Overhauls, reboilering and modifications were carried out in the erecting shop on site, components being made at the iron works and machine shops. None of the locomotives built there survive into preservation although an M&GN C class (Belpaire firebox) boiler survives.

== Concrete production ==
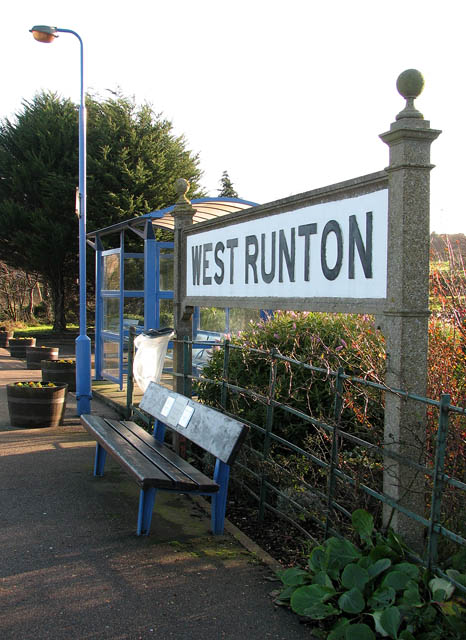
West Runton station Running in board

William Marriott was at Melton Constable from the start. He is known as the 'Father of the M&GN'. Concrete was probably his biggest lasting legacy to the modern world. Melton manufactured ferro-concrete fence posts, then from 1915, signal posts. During World War I, Marriott was asked by the Government to develop building blocks for postwar housing (as there has been bombing). Although concrete had been used before on the railways, William mass-produced it and made everything out of concrete. There were many patents produced relating to developments in concrete sleepers, chairs and signal posts. When the original Holt station burnt down, Melton concrete works produced a new concrete station. Today there are still many examples of the concrete products, including the lamp posts at Sheringham station on the North Norfolk Railway and the station sign at West Runton railway station. Cromer signal box base is made of Melton concrete. After 1916, the M&GN used the concrete blocks for box construction, however only Cromer Beach was built to this design. Gedney railway station sign is a Melton product. The only surviving M&GN signal in original position is Melton concrete (outside the village of Sheringham). Also all the concrete products today have some ancestry in the works.

== Influencing today ==
=== The site now ===
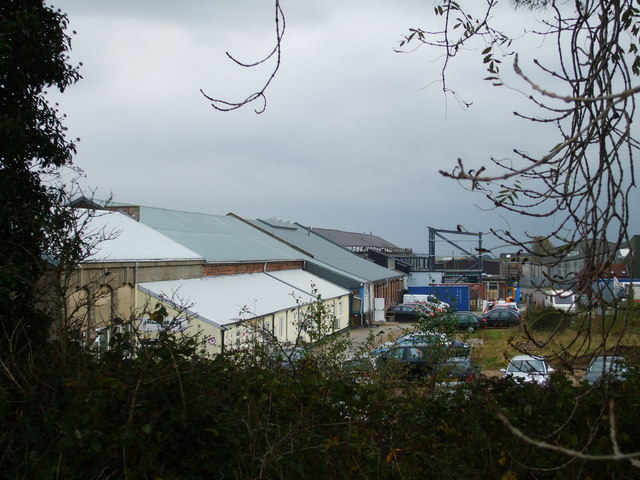
The works from the back

After closure, the station was demolished and the turntable taken out and built on. The site today is Melton Constable industrial estate. The old works buildings (the longshops, erecting shop and engine shed) are used for potato storage. The yard near the water tower is used for storage. To the south of the buildings, the site of the South Junction is now industrial buildings. The gasworks have been demolished. The 1951 engine shed survives in use. The goods shed, although not connected to the works, survives. Many of the buildings have been re-roofed with modern roofs of metal and not tiles. Also, the chimneys have been demolished, one next to the engine shed as recently as the 1990s.

=== Listing and protection ===
The water tower is in the process of being listed for protection. The roof has been replaced to increase its life. The village of Melton Constable has been placed under a protection order to prevent any unnecessary change and preserve the railway village. Land next to the works site has been bought by the village for village use. A Melton Constable concrete works product that is Cromer Beach signal box (the base blocks) is now grade II listed and a working museum.

=== Rolling stock ===
It is not known if any rolling stock products survive but there are some items that could have been serviced there. M&GN 129 (restored) and M&GN 3 (under restoration) could have visited the works when they were in use. Also two M&GN brake vans, number 23 (private site) and number 12 (under restoration). It is known that number 12 was part of the Melton Constable breakdown train. There are many Midland Railway and GNR coaches left that could have been serviced there during the War.

=== Employees ===
Today there are few employees of the works themselves, however in 2000 the Midland and Great Northern Joint Railway Society produced an oral record of former employees. There are still many people in the village and surrounding villages who remember the railway pre Beeching and pre BR cuts. Plus it is hard to find anyone who does not have a relative who used to work on the M&GN or knows someone who did. William Marriott also has living relatives today.

=== 50th Anniversary celebrations ===
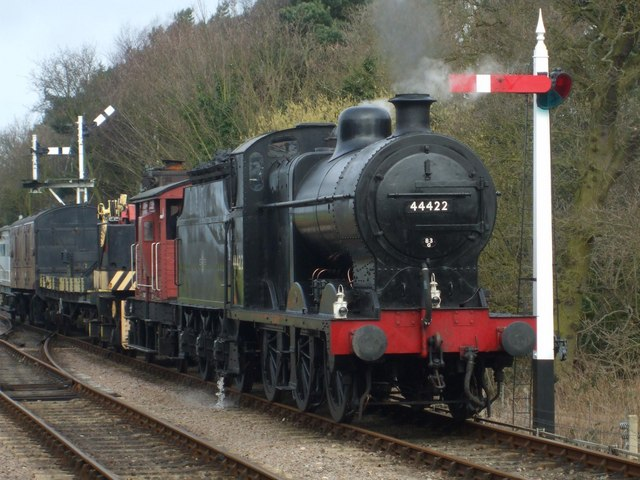
Preserved 44422 on a freight train on the North Norfolk Railway

As part of the Anniversary closure of most of the M&GN on 28 February 1959, the North Norfolk Railway brought Midland Railway 4F 44422 to the works on the back of a low loader for one hour. The free event on 12 February 2009 attracted over 100 people and much media attention as 44222 travelled though the station when it was based at Leicester from 1935 to 1940. 4F locomotives were once common on the M&GN.

== See also ==
- Derby Litchurch Lane Works
- Crewe Works
- Doncaster Works
- Midland Railway
- Rolling stock
- Great Northern Railway
- Stratford Works
- List of railway companies involved in the 1923 grouping
- Horwich Works
- William Marriott
