= Weybourne railway station =

Heritage railway station in Norfolk, England

Weybourne
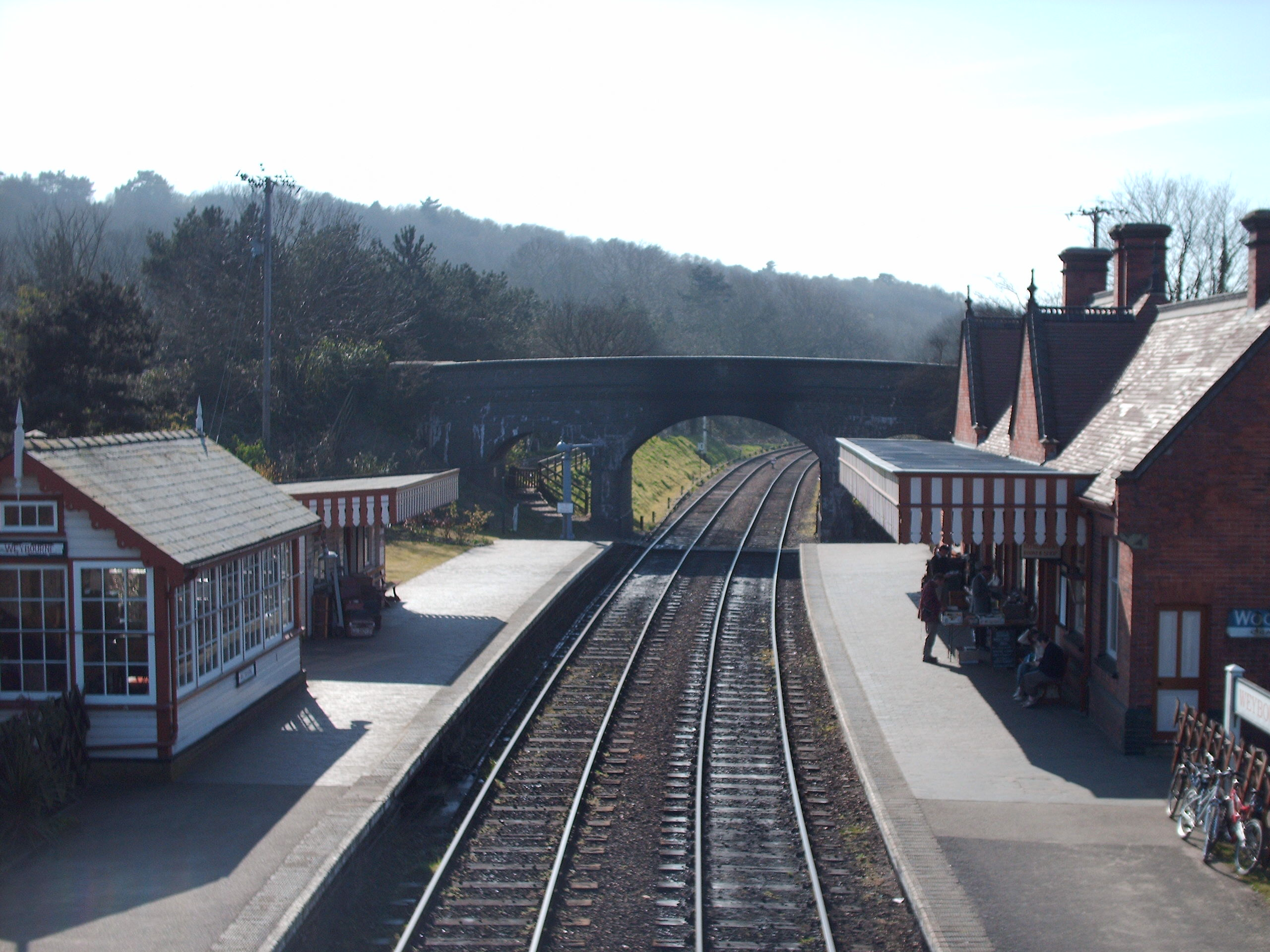
- Weybourne railway station

General information
- Location: Weybourne, North Norfolk; England
- Coordinates: 52.9328°N 1.1499°E
- Grid reference: TG117419
- System: Station on heritage railway
- Operator: North Norfolk Railway plc
- Platforms: 2

History
- Original company: Midland and Great Northern Joint Railway
- Pre-grouping: Midland and Great Northern Joint Railway
- Post-grouping: Midland and Great Northern Joint Railway; Eastern Region of British Railways

Key dates
- 1 July 1901: Opened
- 6 April 1964: Closed
- 13 July 1975: Reopened as a heritage station
Location

Weybourne railway station is an intermediate station on the preserved North Norfolk Railway in Weybourne, Norfolk, England. It was formerly part of the Midland and Great Northern Joint Railway route between Melton Constable and Cromer. Regarded as an iconic Edwardian masterpiece, the station is open whenever trains are in operation and holds various themed events throughout the year.

== History ==
When the Eastern and Midlands Railway extended the line from Holt to Cromer Beach in 1887, there was no station at Weybourne. It wasn’t until the Poppyland tourist boom of the late 1890s that the Midlands & Great Northern Railway (M&GN) decided that they would attempt to develop Weybourne as a holiday resort.

The station was built in 1900 to serve the imposing Weybourne Springs Hotel (now demolished) which was also built around this time; it opened to passengers on 1 July 1901. Weybourne station was built by local craftsmen in a grand late Victorian style and it was arguably one of the grandest stations on the M&GN. The line was closed by British Railways in April 1964. It was reopened as part of the heritage North Norfolk Railway in July 1975.

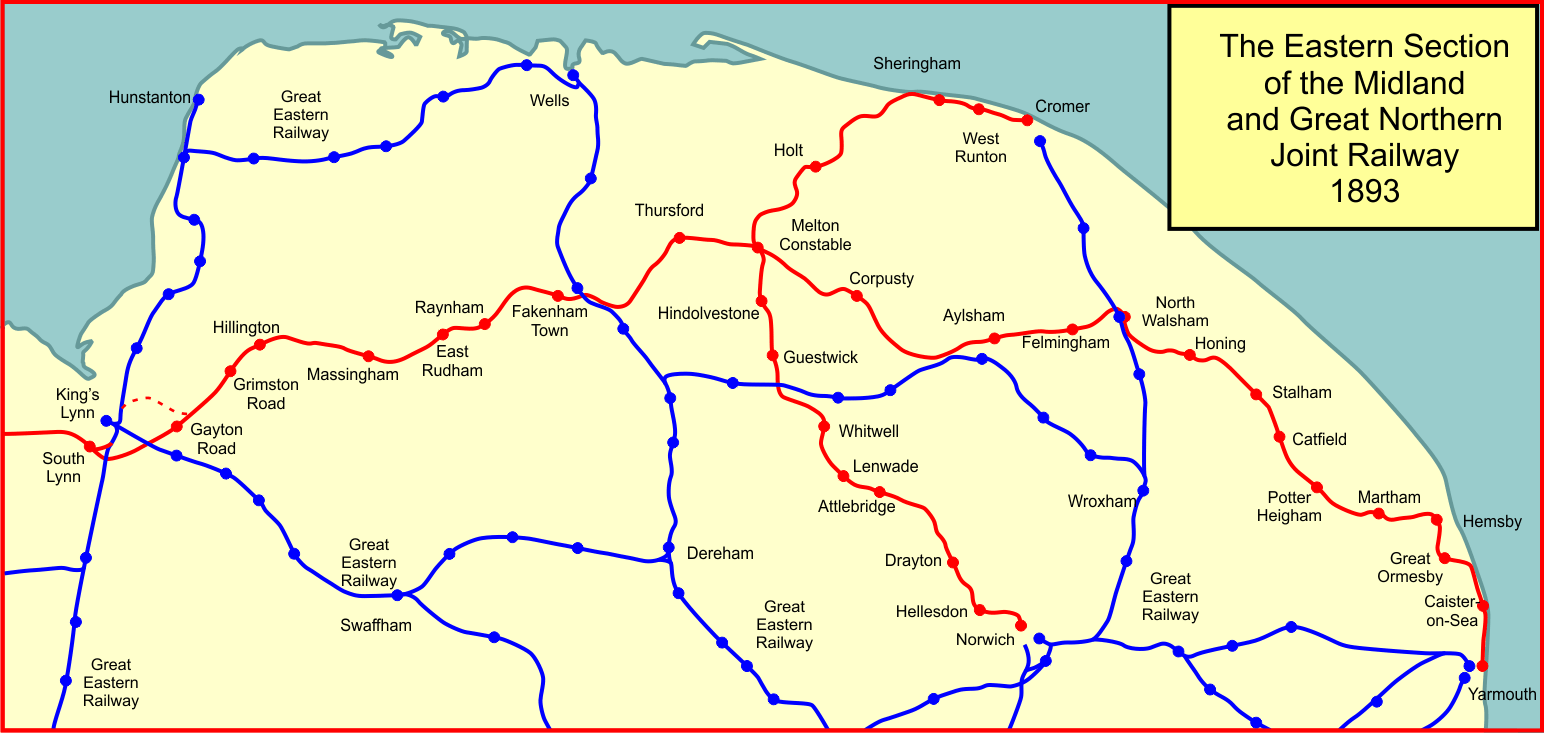
The eastern section of the later M&GNJR

In September 2025 this station and Sheringham station were two of seven railway-associated buildings which were grade II listed in the week of the bicentenary of the Stockton and Darlington Railway. English Heritage recognises it for its architectural and historic interest, describing it as "one of the most substantially complete E&MR stations that displays an impressive architectural quality over and above the functional designs that were adopted for many rural stations nationally during the completion of the rail network", and noting in particular that it has "remarkably complete elevations" and its "internal spaces survive remarkably well".

== Location and facilities ==
The station is located on Station Road, over a mile south-south-east from the centre of Weybourne and is closer to Weybourne Heath.

Weybourne’s former parcel’s office houses a small souvenir shop and buffet which is usually open from 9:30–16:30. A railway bookshop in the old stationmaster’s office sells new and second-hand books between 9:30-15:30 on most days. An accessible toilet and baby changing facilities are in the former lamp room at the Holt end of the building.

== Service ==
The heritage railway is open on most days between April and October, with some additional events over the winter period such as the Santa Specials. The timetable varies throughout the year, with eight services in each direction on the green summer off-peak and up to twelve in the maroon summer peak.

| Preceding station | Heritage railways | Following station |
|---|---|---|
| Kelling Heath Park towards Holt | North Norfolk Railway | Sheringham Terminus |
Disused railways
| Holt; Line and station closed | Midland and Great Northern; Cromer Branch | Sheringham; Line and station open |
Future services
| Holt; Line and station closed | Norfolk Orbital Railway; North Norfolk Railway | Sheringham; Line and station open |

== Media appearances ==
Weybourne railway station (as well as the NNR itself) has been used for filming and on-screen TV appearances, including:

- Walmington-on-Sea railway station in the Dad's Army episode "The Royal Train"
- Thruxton in "A Warning to the Curious" in the BBC's 1972 A Ghost Story for Christmas offering
- Crimpton-on-Sea railway station in the BBC TV sitcom Hi-de-Hi!
- Clayfield railway station in the opening episode of Backs to the Land
- The 1985 adaptation of The Moving Finger.
