= Stalham railway station =

Former railway station in Norfolk, England

Coordinates: 52.7723°N 1.5107°E

Stalham

General information
- Location: Stalham, North Norfolk; England
- Grid reference: TG369251
- Platforms: 2

Other information
- Status: Disused

History
- Pre-grouping: Yarmouth & North Norfolk Railway; Midland and Great Northern Joint Railway
- Post-grouping: Midland and Great Northern Joint Railway; Eastern Region of British Railways

Key dates
- 3 July 1880: Opened
- 2 March 1959: Closed
Location

Stalham railway station was a railway station that served the market town of Stalham in Norfolk, England. It was on the line between Melton Constable and Great Yarmouth. It is now closed, having been shut in 1959 when the line was closed. The station lay derelict and unused for many years after closure. However the station buildings were dismantled and rebuilt at the new Holt station on the North Norfolk Railway.

Former Services

Preceding station	Disused railways	Following station
Honing	Midland and Great Northern; Yarmouth Line	Sutton Staithe Halt
