= Holt railway station (North Norfolk Railway) =

Heritage railway station in Norfolk, England

Holt
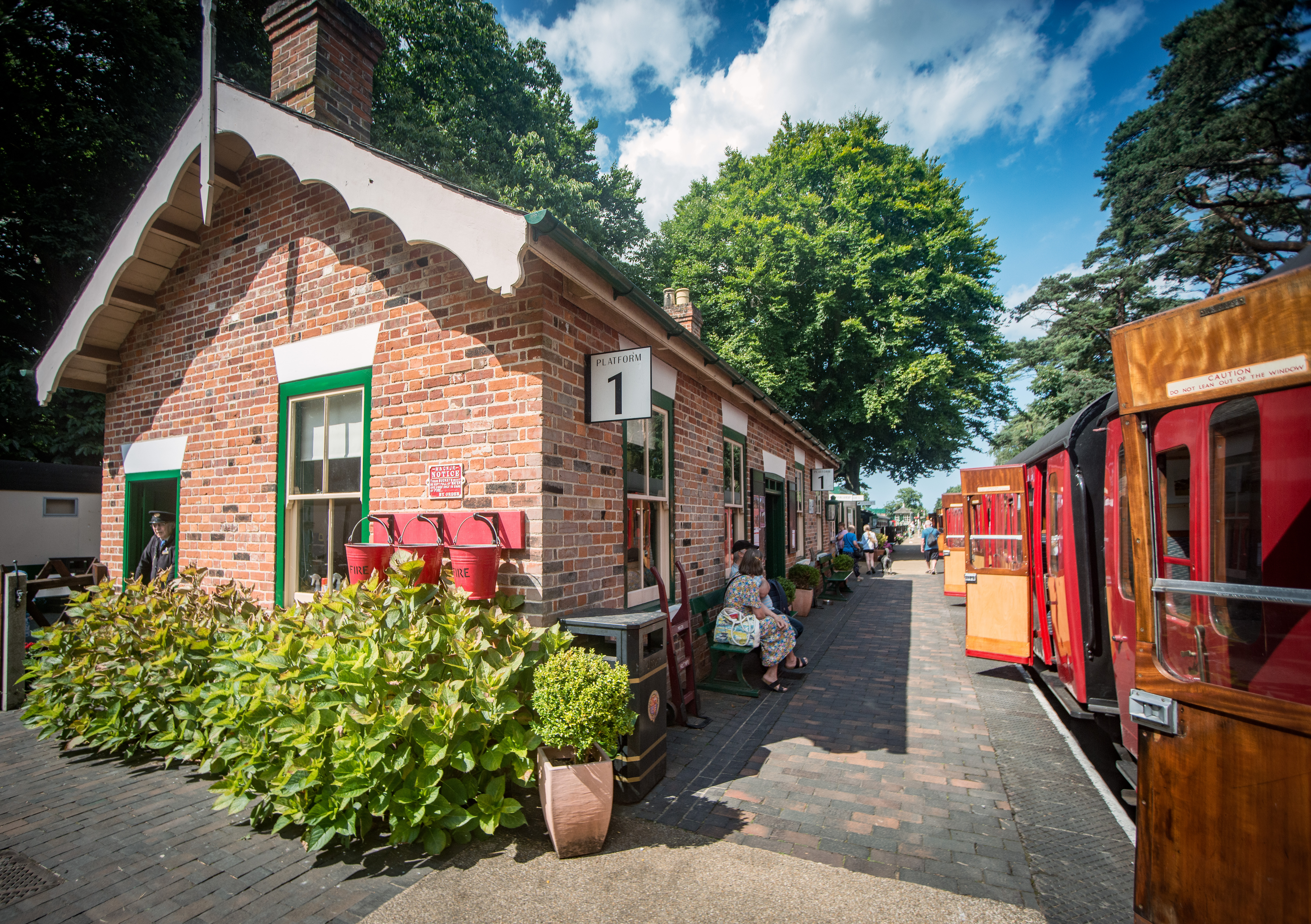
- Holt railway station

General information
- Location: High Kelling, North Norfolk, Norfolk, England
- Coordinates: 52.9145°N 1.1133°E
- Grid reference: TG094395
- System: Station on heritage railway
- Owner: North Norfolk Railway
- Platforms: 2

Key dates
- 1987: Opened
Location

Holt railway station, opened in 1987, is the western terminus of the North Norfolk Railway. It is a new-build station, sited half a mile south of the proposed, but never built, Blakeney branch junction. The station building once belonged to Stalham railway station, but was moved and reconstructed on site. The current station is located just under a mile away from the site of the original Holt railway station, which was closed in 1964 by British Railways.

== Location ==
The station is around a mile from Holt town centre; it also has a large car park.

== William Marriott Museum ==
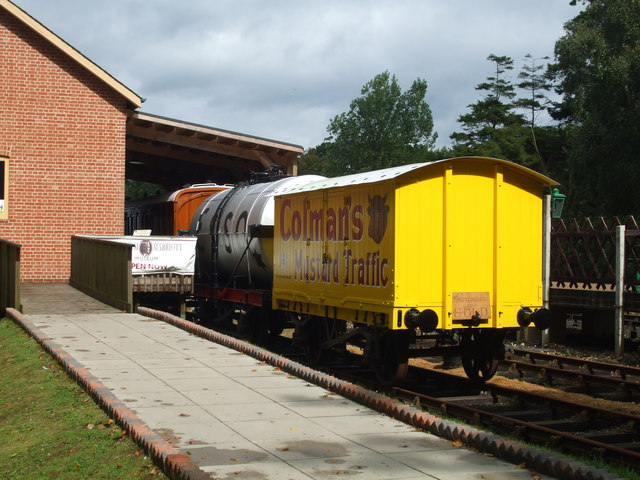
The museum with stock with the replica M&GN goods shed (based on Thursford railway station)

The William Marriott Museum is located in the goods shed at the station. Operated by the Midland and Great Northern Joint Railway Society, the museum features railroad artefacts and memorabilia, as well as historic buildings, locomotives, rolling stock and a historic signalling system. The museum is open on days when the North Norfolk Railway is operating.

== Miniature railway ==
For around 16 years, the Holt station included a miniature railway operated by the North Norfolk Model Railway Club. In 2019, the miniature line was forced to close due to plans to redevelop the part of the site that they occupied. In 2020, it was announced that the miniature line would be rebuilt at County School on the neighbouring Mid-Norfolk Railway.

== Service ==
The heritage railway is open on most days between April and October, with some additional events over the winter period such as the Santa Specials. The timetable varies throughout the year, with eight services in each direction on the green summer off-peak and up to twelve in the maroon summer peak.

| Preceding station | Heritage railways | Following station |
|---|---|---|
| Terminus | North Norfolk Railway | Kelling Heath Park towards Sheringham |
Disused railways
| Holt; Line and station closed | Midland and Great Northern; Cromer Branch | Weybourne; Line and station open |
