= Kelling Heath Park railway station =

Heritage railway station on Kelling Heath, North Norfolk

Kelling Heath Park
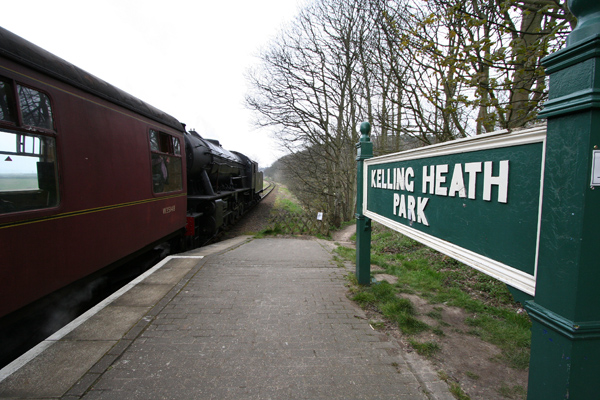

General information
- Location: Kelling Heath, North Norfolk, Norfolk; England
- Coordinates: 52.932174°N 1.137592°E
- Grid reference: TG109417
- System: Station on heritage railway
- Owner: North Norfolk Railway
- Platforms: 1

Key dates
- 28 August 1983: Opened as Kelling Camp Halt
- 1989: Resited ¼ mile west and renamed
Location

Kelling Heath Park is a small halt on the North Norfolk Railway (NNR), used mostly by hikers using Kelling Heath. It was opened after the line was preserved.

The station was opened in 1983 as part of the NNR's extension to Kelling; a very short half coach-length halt was constructed principally to serve the nearby caravan park. Upon the completion of the extension to Holt in 1989, Kelling Camp Halt was demolished and a new longer platform was constructed ¼ of a mile further up the hill to the west; the station was also renamed "Kelling Heath Park". In March 1998, a new down distant signal was brought into use at the eastern end of Kelling Cutting.

Preceding station	Heritage railways	Following station
Holt Terminus	North Norfolk Railway	Weybourne towards Sheringham
