= Fakenham West railway station =

Former railway station in Norfolk, England

Coordinates: 52.8268°N 0.8437°E

Fakenham West
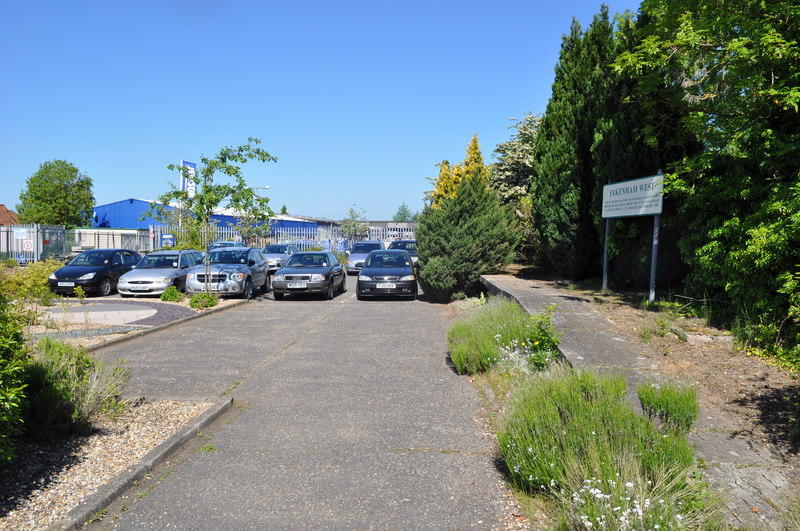

General information
- Location: Fakenham, North Norfolk; England
- Grid reference: TF916292
- Platforms: 2

Other information
- Status: Disused

History
- Original company: Lynn and Fakenham Railway
- Pre-grouping: Midland and Great Northern Joint Railway
- Post-grouping: Midland and Great Northern Joint Railway; Eastern Region of British Railways

Key dates
- 16 August 1880: Opened as Fakenham Town
- by 1910: Renamed Fakenham
- 27 September 1948: Renamed Fakenham West
- 2 March 1959: Closed
Location

Fakenham West railway station was a station in Norfolk. It was built as part of the Midland and Great Northern Joint Railway main line that ran from Saxby and Peterborough North to Yarmouth Beach, with branches to Norwich City and Cromer.

The station was opened by the Lynn and Fakenham Railway on 16 August 1880, when it was originally named Fakenham Town, and was renamed Fakenham by 1910. Following railway nationalisation, it was renamed again to become Fakenham West by British Railways on 27 September 1948. The station was closed on 2 March 1959.

Part of a platform from the station survives outside the car park of the Jewson builder's merchant, and the trackbed south of the platform is visible as a roadway.

Fakenham was also served by another railway station, Fakenham East railway station, on the Wymondham to Wells Branch of the Great Eastern Railway. This line was unconnected to the Midland and Great Northern line through Fakenham West, which it passed over on a bridge about one mile east of Fakenham West, quarter a mile southeast of Fakenham East. Currently there are no railway links to Fakenham; however, the Norfolk Orbital Railway proposes to build a new station close to the site of Fakenham East in the future.

Preceding station	Disused railways	Following station
Raynham Park; Line and station closed	Midland and Great Northern	Thursford; Line and station closed
	Proposed Heritage railways	
	Future services	
Thursford	Norfolk Orbital Railway	Ryburgh

== See also ==
- List of closed railway stations in Norfolk
