= North Norfolk Railway =

Heritage railway in Norfolk, England

Coordinates: 52.9345°N 1.1545°E

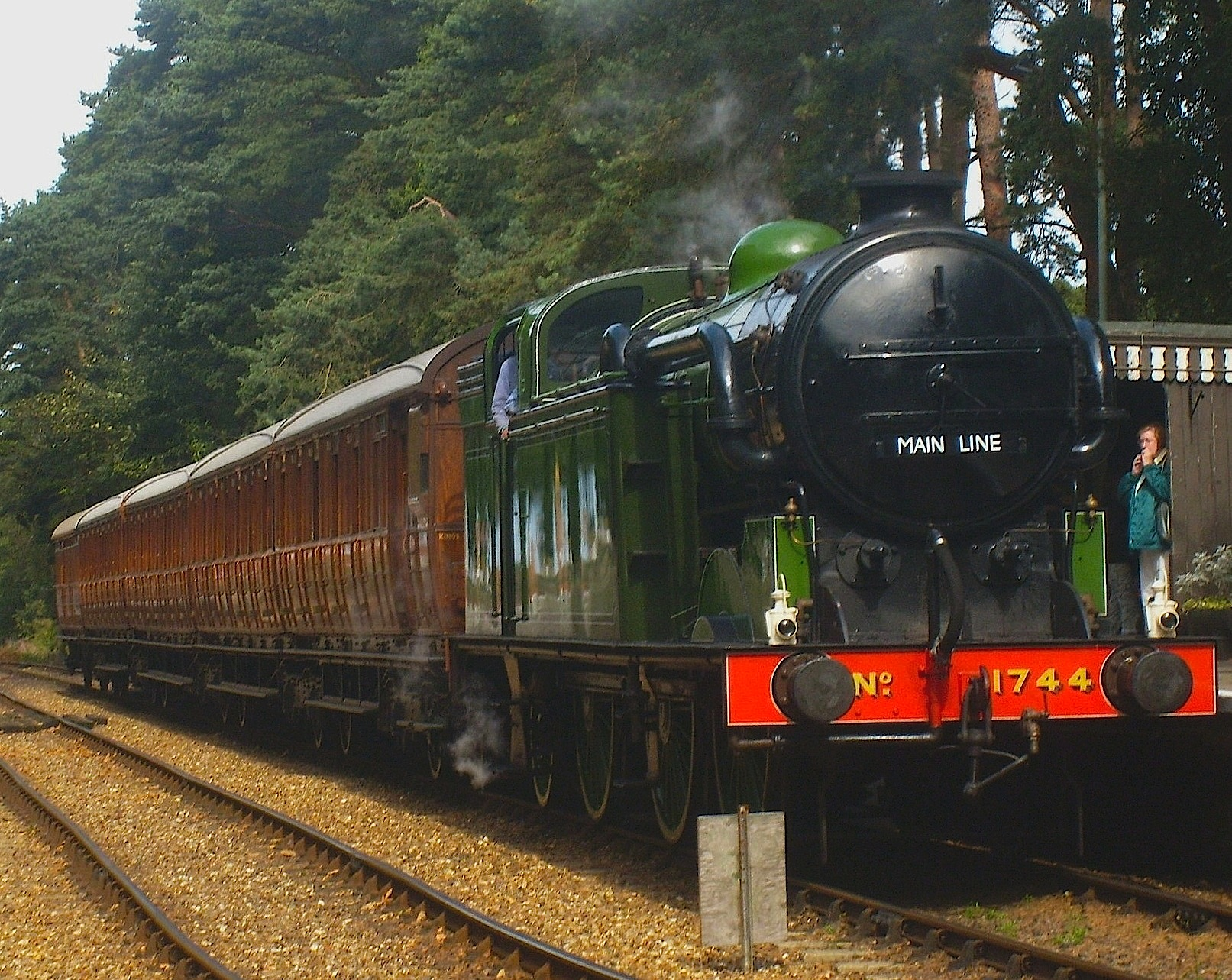
- GNR 0-6-2T Class N2 No. 1744 and the Quad Art Set No. 74 at Holt
- Locale: North Norfolk
- Terminus: Sheringham and Holt
- Connections: National Rail (at Sheringham)

Commercial operations
- Name: Midland & Great Northern Joint Railway
- Built by: William Marriott
- Original gauge: 4 ft 8 1/2 in (1,435 mm) standard gauge

Preserved operations
- Operated by: North Norfolk Railway
- Stations: 4
- Length: 5.25 miles (8.45 km)
- Preserved gauge: 4 ft 8 1/2 in (1,435 mm) standard gauge

Commercial history
- Opened: 1887
- Closed: 1964

Preservation history
- 1975: Reopened to Weybourne
- 1968: NNR begins restoration work on the line
- 1974: NNR granted Light Railway Order
- 1975: NNR re-opens to the public, (and Sheringham to Weybourne service officially begins)
- 1983: Kelling Heath Halt opens; NNR extended at the same time
- 1989: NNR extended to High Kelling near Holt
- 2010: NNR reconnects to the national rail network (towards Cromer)
- Headquarters: Sheringham

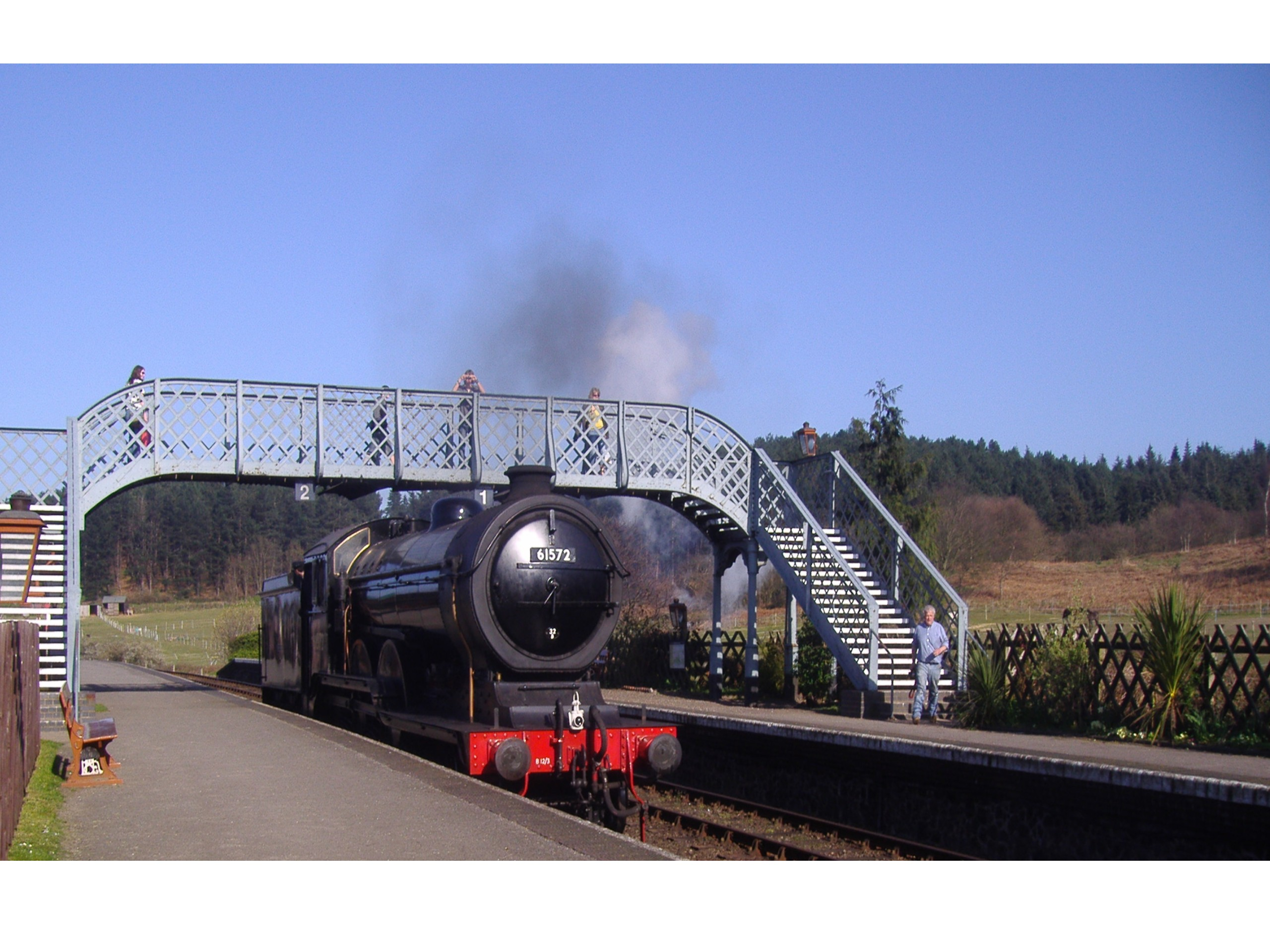
LNER 4-6-0 Class B12 no. 61572 at Weybourne station

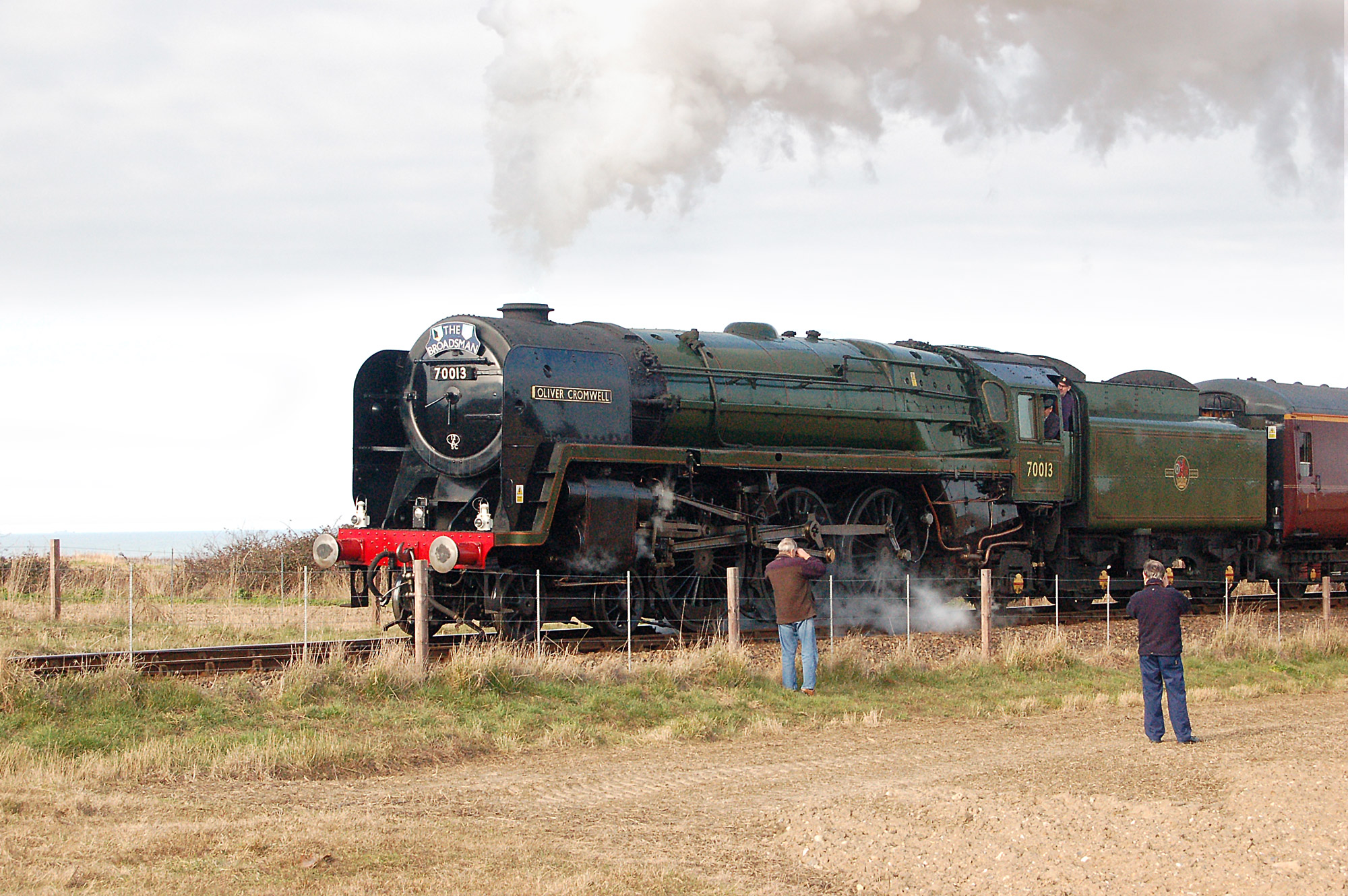
Visiting 7MT 70013 Oliver Cromwell approaching Weybourne.

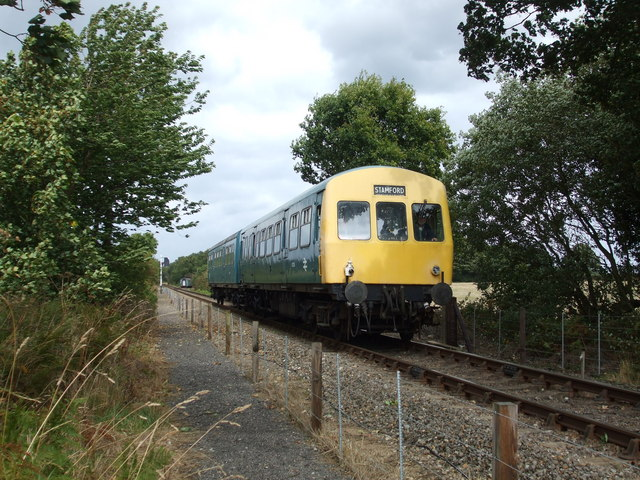
Class 101 DMU approaching Holt.

The North Norfolk Railway (NNR) – also known as the "Poppy Line" – is a 5 1/4-mile (8.4 km) heritage steam railway in Norfolk, England, running between the towns of Sheringham and Holt. The North Norfolk Railway is owned and operated as a public limited company, originally called Central Norfolk Enterprises Limited. The railway is listed as exempt from the UK Railways (Interoperability) Regulations 2000.

== History ==
=== Route history ===
The line once formed part of the Midland and Great Northern Joint Railway's Melton Constable to Cromer Beach branch line. The first section, from Melton to Holt, was opened on 1 October 1884. After a suspension of work, the Holt to Cromer section of line was completed by direct labour and opened on 16 June 1887. A through Kings Cross to Cromer express started running in August 1887 and, although the construction had been expensive, the boost to revenue from the new line was considerable. A second train was put on the following year, in the down direction, consisting of coaches slipped at Peterborough from a GNR Manchester train. The time from Kings Cross to Cromer was typically 4 1/2 hours, but the GER achieved Liverpool Street to Cromer in 3 1/2 hours.

The Lynn & Fakenham Railway had proposed a branch from this line, at Kelling, to Blakeney, via Cley and Wiveton. The decision was taken not to go ahead with this line, but land for the proposed junction at Kelling had already been secured. Ballast sidings for the company developed in the Kelling area to service the needs of the company. In 1903, a station was added at Weybourne, having previously been refused.

Under the Railways Act 1921, the line, along with the rest of the M&GN, was jointly managed by the LMS and LNER, retaining its own directors and staff. This continued until 1935, when the parent companies agreed that local administration should be undertaken by the LNER. The line became part of the Eastern Region of British Railways under the Transport Act 1947.

In 1954, British Railways announced the closure of the former Great Eastern Railway terminus at Cromer High, with all traffic being routed into the M&GN station at Cromer Beach. The majority of the M&GN system was closed to passengers on 28 February 1959, although the line between Melton Constable and Cromer retained a good level of passenger service - becoming an extension of the former GER line from Norwich.

The Beeching Report of April 1963 called for the end of passenger services between Melton Constable and Sheringham; this was approved by the government on 6 April 1964.

=== Preservation history ===
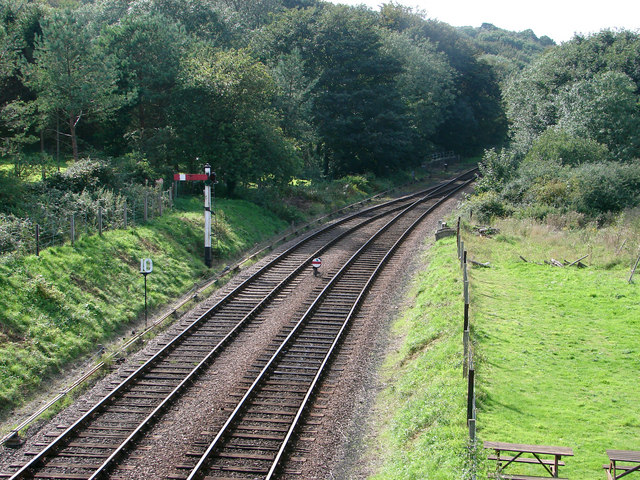
Looking towards Holt from Weybourne

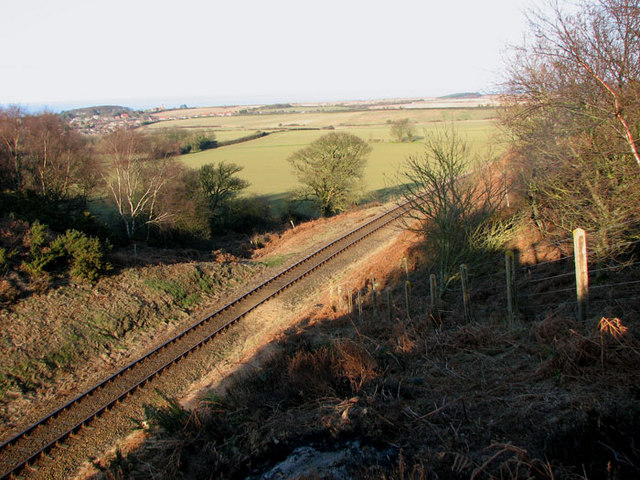
The railway through Kelling Heath

The Midland & Great Northern Joint Railways Preservation Society formed in April 1959, initially hoping to save the 22-mile long North Walsham Town to Yarmouth Beach section; later, the North Walsham to Aylsham North and Themelthorpe to Melton Constable sections. After these plans proved impossible, attention turned to the 3 miles (4.8 km) section of line between Sheringham and Weybourne. In 1963, the Society formed North Norfolk Railways Limited, initially required to be titled the Central Norfolk Enterprises due to not owning any railway, to preserve and operate the line.

Sheringham station was still being used by British Rail services and, by the time the purchase had been completed, track lifting had taken place at Weybourne and some way towards Sheringham. Work on rebuilding the line started in 1965 and Sheringham station was leased by the society following closure in 1967 with two steam locomotives, two diesel railbuses and the LNER Quad-Art set being delivered on 4 June 1967.

Initially, trains were only operated for members. Operations over the line were later authorised through a light railway order; the first was the British Railways Board (Sheringham and Weybourne) Light Railway Order 1973 (SI 1973/998), under control of British Rail, and independently following the British Railways Board (Sheringham and Weybourne) Light Railway (Transfer) Order 1976 (SI 1976/702). The North Norfolk (Extension and Amendment) Light Railway Order 1987 (SI 1987/950) was issued relating to the extension of the NNR to a new station site at Holt – using a parcel of land originally purchased as the junction for the never-built Blakeney branch.

At Sheringham, the line has now been reconnected to the town's main station on the National Rail network, via an occasional-use level crossing; crossings by charter trains and visiting rolling stock are anticipated not to exceed 12 times a year. The North Norfolk Railway also operate a number of dining trains over the entire surviving section of the M&GN, between Holt and Cromer, during summer months. Services began in 2016, working in partnership with the North Yorkshire Moors Railway, who were already a licensed operator on Network Rail. The Tourist information Centre and public toilets, that sat on the footprint of part of the trackbed between the station and the network rail link, were demolished and rebuilt in the style of the station, releasing the trackbed alignment for this development.

=== Closure threat ===
In 2001, it was announced that the railway was in danger of closure; this was due to the landlords of Sheringham station reportedly wanting to sell the site for redevelopment and the railway's lease on the site expiring in June of that year. The railway was able to raise £290,000 to purchase the site, with offered funding including an interest-free, 5-year private loan of £150,000.

== Present day ==
There are two stations between Sheringham and Holt: Weybourne, which is about 1 mile (1.6 km) away from the village, and Kelling Heath Park.

The NNR operates both steam- and diesel-hauled services; it organises a programme of seasonal special events including steam galas, diesel galas, Santa and Norfolk Lights expresses.

The main restoration sheds, including the former locomotive shed from Norwich City, are at Weybourne. They have room to accommodate four standard length British Railways Mark 1 coaches and six large steam or diesel locomotives. New carriage storage sheds have been built near Holt with £308,000 Heritage Lottery funding. These have the capacity to store the equivalent of 18 Mark 1 coaches.

A museum has been built at Holt to display artifacts from the Midland and Great Northern Joint Railway. The station building at Holt was originally built at Stalham in 1883; it was moved, brick by brick, in 2002 and was re-erected in its current location. This project was awarded second place in the 2006 railway buildings competition by the Heritage Railway Association of the UK. The signal box at the station is over 100 years old and was restored on-site. The full signalling system at Holt, with 14 signals as well as the box, was commissioned in 2009 – winning the HRA signalling award for that year. The box was formerly at Upper Portland Sidings in the East Midlands. The Holt site also includes a reconstructed carriage house, which was completed in late 2009; it is a relocated example of the houses made with old railway carriages in the war years and a weighbridge recovered from Cambridge.

The railway is operated mainly by volunteers.

=== Awards ===
- 2009 - NRHA: The National Rail Heritage Awards Volunteers Award, for Holt signal box
- 2009 - NHRA: The Invensis Rail Signalling Award: Structure, Holt signal box
- 2016 - Hoseasons Tourism Awards: Best 'large attraction' in Norfolk and Suffolk
- 2016 - Heritage Railway Association: Annual Award (Large Groups), for extending steam services of the main line between two major coastal resorts and extending the boundaries of railway preservation
- 2018 - Heritage Railway Association: Coiley Locomotive Engineering Award, Runner-up, for 90775 major overhaul.
- 2022 - Queens Award for Voluntary Service in recognition of their outstanding voluntary work in the community.

=== Television, film and theatre use ===
- In May 1973, the railway was the scene of filming for the episode "The Royal Train" of the popular TV programme Dad's Army.
- In 1983, the railway, and the then-unrestored Quad-Art set were used as locations in the filming of the adaption of Coot Club, part of the BBC series Swallows and Amazons Forever!.
- In 1994, the railway provided a location for the BBC's Love on a Branch Line.
- Other productions that have used the line include The Lost Prince, All The King's Men, Sherlock Holmes and Reel History of Britain.

== Route details ==
Starting from Sheringham station, the lines follows the coast westwards, soon passing over the Automatic Open Crossing at Sweetbriar Lane, where the private road leading to Sheringham Golf Club crosses the line. The line climbs a 1 in 97 gradient, with the golf course, and Skelding Hill, on the seaward side of trains, while the A149 can be seen on the landward side of trains, roughly paralleling the tracks with Upper Sheringham visible in the distance. During WW2, Skelding Hill was the location for an emergency coastal battery, complete with an underground headquarters bunker.

The train then begins a 1 in 100 descent, passing under a farm occupation bridge and passing through a cutting on the edge of Deadman's Hill, reputedly the burial place for plague victims from Weybourne village. After crossing over the A149 on Bridge 303 the train begins to climb a 1 in 80 gradient, and turns slightly inland. The village of Weybourne can be seen on the seaward side of the line.

The train next arrives at Weybourne, where the large locomotive and carriage works can be seen on the seaward side of the running line. The signal box was recovered from Holt, as the original was accidentally demolished by British Railways contractors after the line had been purchased by the North Norfolk Railway.

Leaving Weybourne, the train continues to climb a 1 in 80 gradient, passing the wooded site of the former Weybourne Springs Hotel that the station was built to serve. Kelling Heath Park is soon reached. This is a single coach platform, built during the restoration of the line, and sits on the gradient, so most locomotive-hauled trains only stop here when running in the down direction (towards Sheringham).

After passing through a deep cutting, the gradient eases and the train passes over a level crossing on Kelling Heath, turning further inland as it heads towards Holt. After passing under a road bridge, a modern carriage shed is passed on the inland side of the line. This area had once featured a number of ballast sidings used by the M&GN.

The train now approaches the Holt station, with a signal box and reconstructed goods shed visible on the "seaward" side of the train. The line terminates here, but it is possible to see where the line originally continued towards Melton Constable.

== The future ==
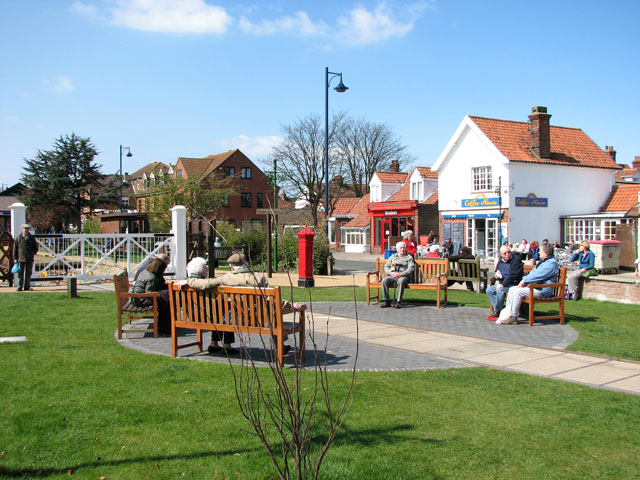
Sheringham - the new level crossing.

With the level crossing at Sheringham reinstated, one of the next projects is to rebuild the demolished buildings on platform 2 at Sheringham station; the stanchions for the project are at Weybourne. This is seen as a medium to long-term project, but a start may be made soon on erecting the stanchions. The project has already seen a footbridge replaced.

Holt station is also being developed, with projects including erecting a footbridge.

== Rolling stock ==
There are a variety of preserved steam and diesel locomotives, diesel multiple units, passenger coaches and goods wagons. Most of these are typical of the London and North Eastern Railway (LNER) branch lines in Norfolk. Some are owned by the railway itself, but most are owned by various individuals or voluntary groups. The line is also regularly visited by locomotives based elsewhere; some locomotives come for a day on a railtour, others for a few days or weeks to take part in a special gala, but a few stay for many months and form part of the stock working scheduled trains.

== Accidents ==
- On 30 October 1984, a volunteer died after falling from bridge 303 during the rebuilding of the structure, which crosses the Coast Road.
- On 19 September 2015, London & North Eastern Railway Class B12 4-6-0 No. 8572, running light engine, collided with the buffers at the Holt terminus of the line. The buffers were partially demolished, and the fire service attended. The fireman was slightly injured and was checked over in hospital.
- On 17 November 2018, Great Eastern Railway Class Y14 0-6-0 locomotive 564 was in collision with a car on the level crossing accessing Sheringham golf course, while travelling at about 10 mph. The car was badly damaged, but nobody was hurt and the train and rail infrastructure was not damaged. This automatic open level crossing, controlled by lights which were working properly at the time, is the only one in regular use on the railway. The car driver was later fined for his involvement.

== Funding and associated bodies ==
The railway relies on a variety of sources to fund its operation. Funding sources have included:

A £419,000 carriage store (Bridge Road Carriage Sheds) was constructed close to Holt with the help of a 2006 grant of £308,000 from the Heritage Lottery Fund. A path from Holt station was included, but stops just before the sheds, with no public access to the site being possible.

In April 2013, the line was awarded £99,500 from the National Lottery Heritage Fund (NLHF) to further its restoration and education programmes, specifically to show the impact railways had on the development of the London suburbs.

In 2016, the line was celebrating the completion of a new Tourist Information Centre at Sheringham and a new boiler shop at Weybourne, which were made possible by a £498,000 award from the government's Coastal Community Fund. North Norfolk District Council also awarded £154,000 towards the work.

In April 2020, the Midland and Great Northern Joint Railway Society, backers of the North Norfolk Railway, purchased Hunslet 0-6-0ST locomotive No. 1982, "Ring Haw" and a crane from the company in order to release funds for the line and ensure that the vehicles remained on the North Norfolk Railway.

In July 2020, the line was given a grant of £46,500 towards reinstating train services from the NLHF Emergency appeal.

In October 2020, the line was awarded £360,000 from the Culture Recovery Fund (from the Heritage and the Heritage Stimulus Fund), funded by the government and administered by Historic England and the NLHF.

== See also ==
- Bressingham Steam and Gardens
- Bure Valley Railway
- Mid-Norfolk Railway
- Wells and Walsingham Light Railway
- Whitwell & Reepham railway station
- Yaxham Light Railway
- Barton House Railway
