= Sheringham railway station (North Norfolk Railway) =

Heritage railway station in Norfolk, England

Sheringham
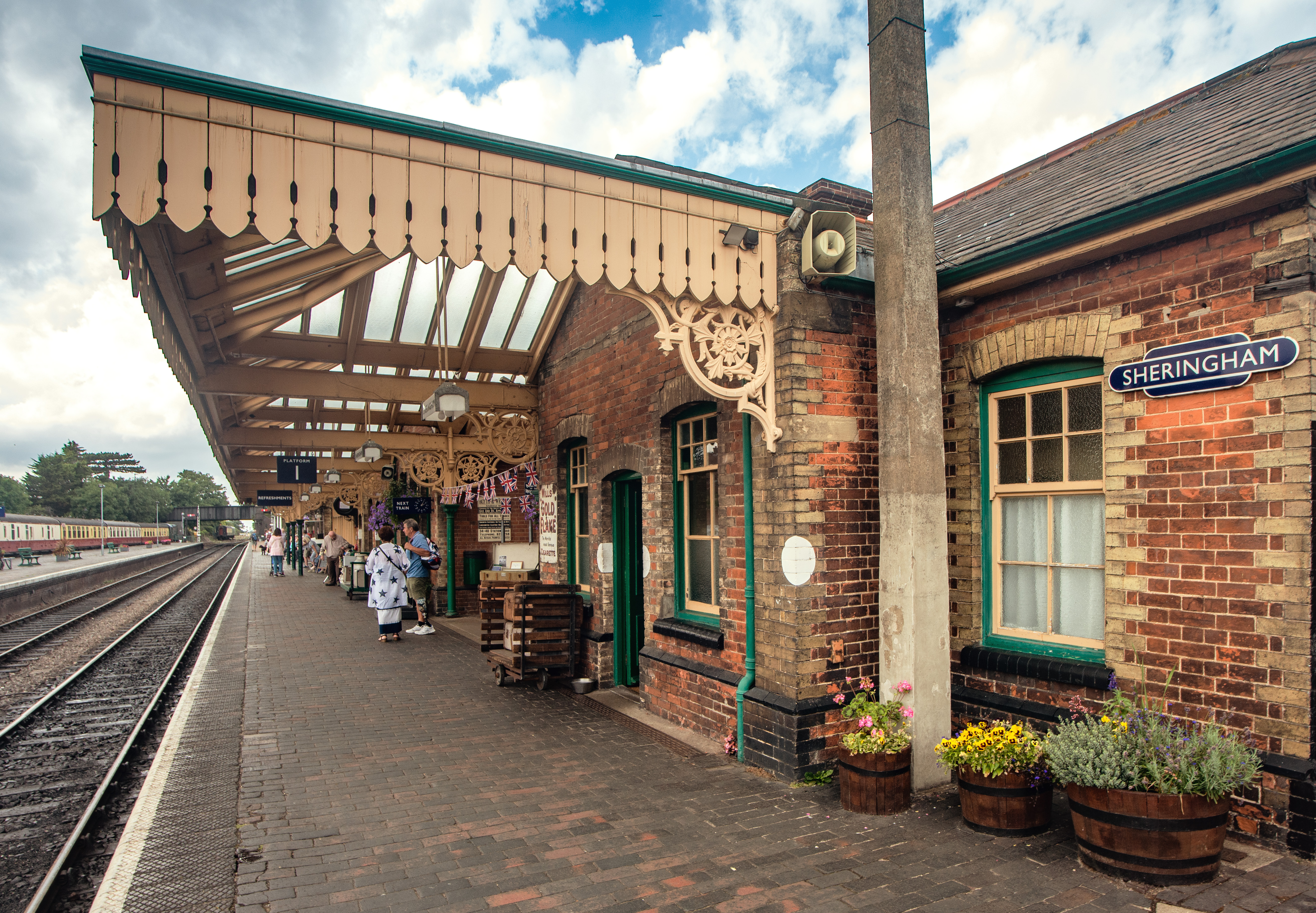
- Station platform

General information
- Location: Sheringham, North Norfolk, England
- Coordinates: 52.9418°N 1.208°E
- Grid reference: TG156430
- System: Station on heritage railway
- Owner: Midland and Great Northern Joint Railway, Eastern Region of British Railways, North Norfolk Railway
- Manager: Eastern & Midlands Railway, Midland and Great Northern Joint Railway
- Platforms: 3

Key dates
- 16 June 1887: Opened as Sherringham
- 1897: Renamed Sheringham
- 2 January 1967: Closed upon opening of new BR station
- 13 July 1975: Reopened as heritage station
Location

Sheringham is a heritage railway station in Sheringham, Norfolk, England. It was once part of the Midland and Great Northern Joint Railway network between 1887 and 1967, when a new station was opened by British Rail c.200 metres (220 yd) eastwards. Since July 1975, it has served as the eastern terminus of the North Norfolk Railway. In March 2010, the link to the Network Rail system was reinstated.

== History ==
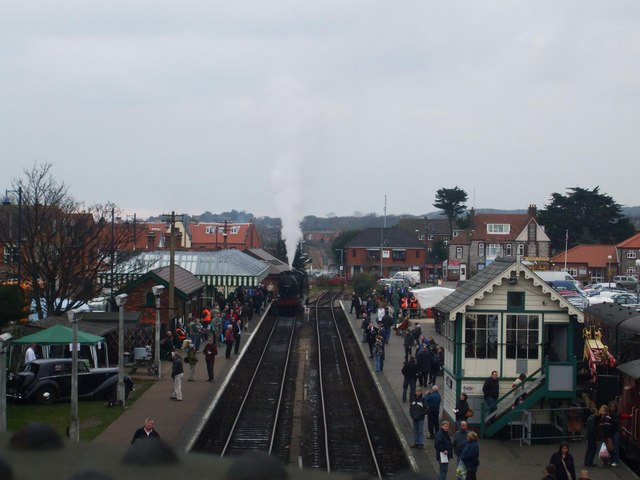
The view from the 1905 road bridge

The station was first opened on 16 June 1887 by the Eastern and Midlands Railway as part of the Cromer Branch linking the Norfolk Coast to the junction at Melton Constable railway station. In 1893 this was merged into the Midland and Great Northern Joint Railway network. On 6 April 1964 in the wake of the Beeching Report, the line to Melton Constable was closed to passengers. Withdrawal of goods services from that line, as well as from Sheringham itself, followed on 28 December 1964. Sheringham station remained open for passengers until 2 January 1967, when it was closed upon the opening of a new station for passengers on the opposite side of Station Road, enabling the level crossing to be closed.

On 13 July 1975, the station was reopened as part of the North Norfolk Railway, which runs along the old Cromer Branch route as far as Holt. Another Sheringham railway station exists on the National Rail network, just across the road from the NNR station.

In September 2025, this station and Weybourne were two of seven railway-associated buildings which were grade II listed in the week of the bicentenary of the Stockton and Darlington Railway. English Heritage recognises it for its architectural and historic interest, describing it as "one of the most substantially complete E&MR stations that displays an impressive architectural quality over and above the functional designs that were adopted for many rural stations nationally during the completion of the rail network." In particular, it noted its "remarkably complete" elevations and interiors.

== Reconnection to the National Rail network ==
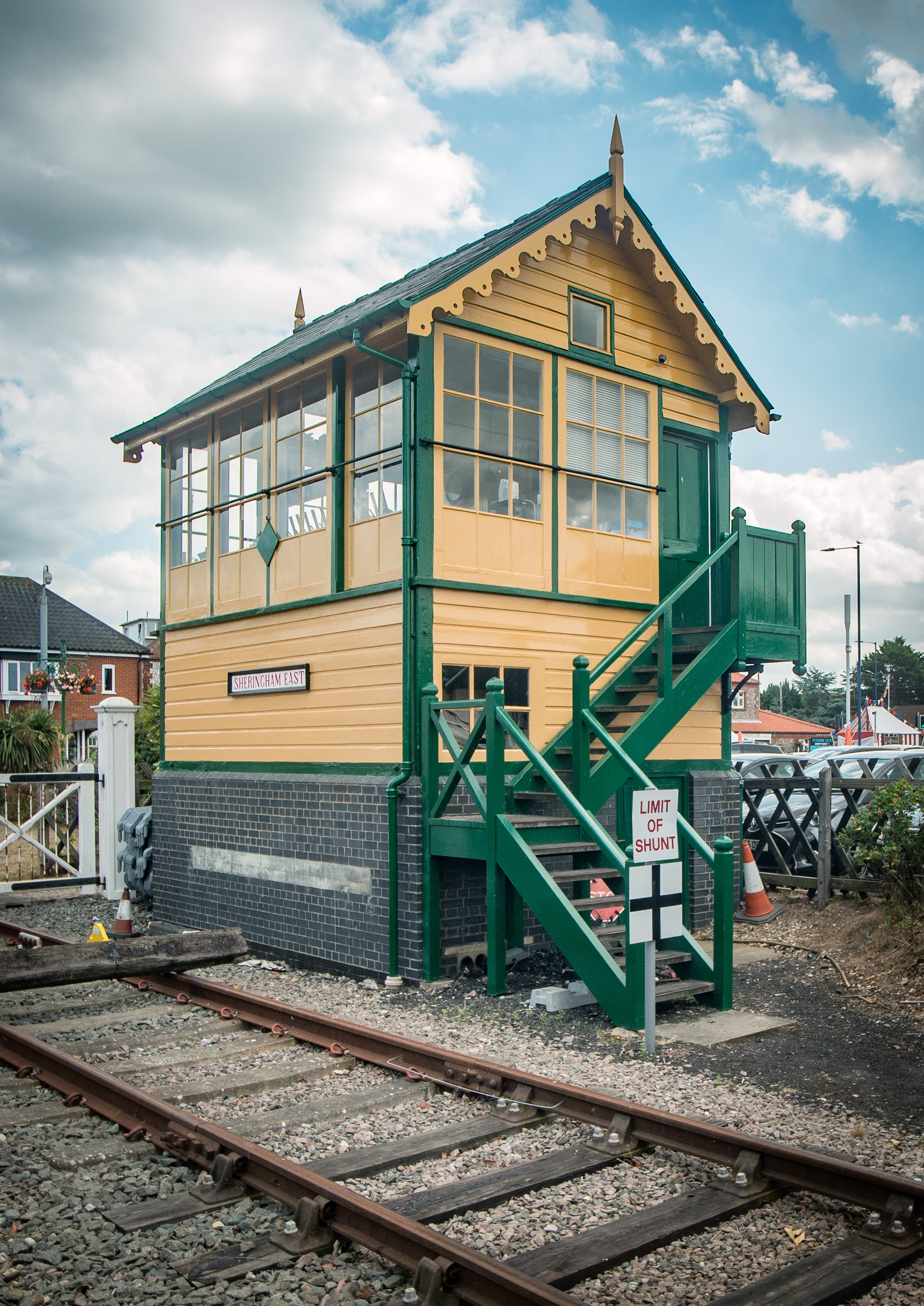
Sheringham signal box

Between 2007 and 2010, work was undertaken to reinstate the original level crossing across the road to allow trains from Norwich to run onto the North Norfolk Railway heritage line tracks. On 17 December 2007, BBC Look East reported that Network Rail supported the level crossing plans to allow occasional use for trains to cross between tracks. On 16 December 2008, it was announced by the North Norfolk Railway that work was going to start on the new level crossing in January 2009. These plans were later delayed until 2010, due to various problems including lack of funding, electricity cables needing to be moved and the county's highways department concerns with the implications of road closure to create the crossing.

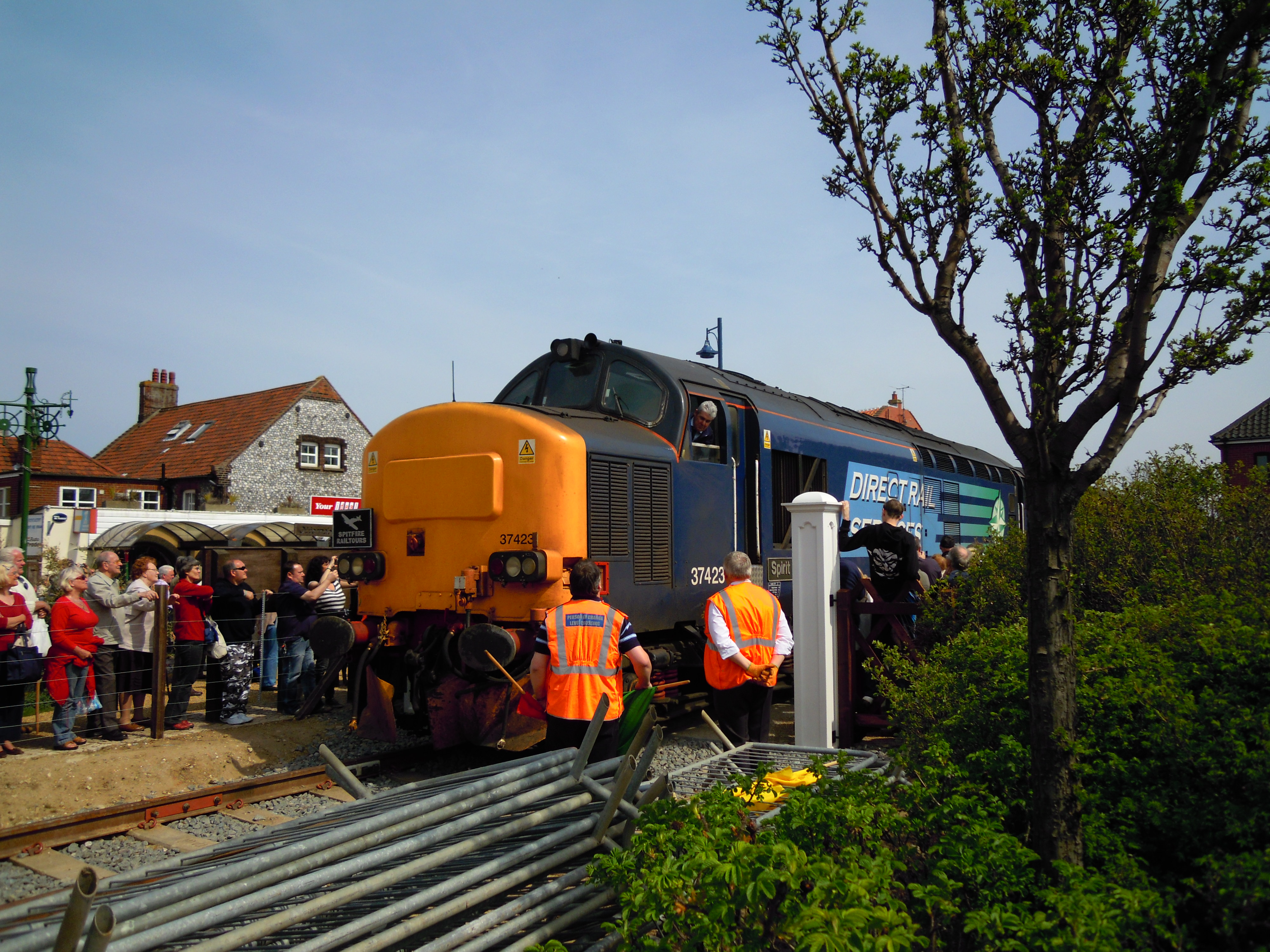
The second train to use the new level crossing, Saturday 24 April 2010

Work began on 8 January 2010, with the moving of the NNR headshunt to slew into line with the Network Rail section. The link was reinstated on 11 March 2010, when the first passenger carrying train over the new crossing was steam locomotive '‘Oliver Cromwell’' hauling a train from London Liverpool Street. Occasional uses by charter trains and visiting rolling stock are anticipated to not exceed 12 times a year.

== Services ==
The heritage railway is open on most days between April and October, with some additional events over the winter period such as the Santa Specials. The timetable varies throughout the year, with eight services in each direction on the green summer off-peak and up to twelve in the maroon summer peak.

Preceding station	Heritage railways	Following station
Weybourne towards Holt	North Norfolk Railway	Terminus
Disused railways
Weybourne; Line and station open	Midland and Great Northern; Cromer Branch	West Runton; Line closed, station open
Future services
Weybourne; Line and station open	Norfolk Orbital Railway; North Norfolk Railway	Terminus
National Rail
Interchange with Sheringham on the Bittern Line
