= Eastern and Midlands Railway =

Railway in Norfolk, England

Overview
- Locale: East of England

Service
- Depot(s): Melton Constable Railway Works

History
- Opened: 1883; 143 years ago
- Closed: 1893; 133 years ago, became part of the Midland and Great Northern Joint Railway

Technical
- Track gauge: 4 ft 8 1/2 in (1,435 mm)

Eastern and Midlands Railway (Amalgamation) Act 1882
- Act of Parliament
- Parliament of the United Kingdom
- Long title: An Act to amalgamate the Lynn and Fakenham the Yarmouth and North Norfolk (Light) the Yarmouth Union the Midland and Eastern and the Peterborough Wisbeach and Sutton Railway Companies.
- Citation: 45 & 46 Vict. c. ccxxvii

Dates
- Royal assent: 18 August 1882

Text of statute as originally enacted

Eastern and Midlands Railway Act 1883
- Act of Parliament
- Parliament of the United Kingdom
- Long title: An Act to authorise the Eastern and Midlands Railway Company to construct new Works and for other purposes.
- Citation: 46 & 47 Vict. c. cxcix

Dates
- Royal assent: 20 August 1883

Text of statute as originally enacted

The Eastern and Midlands Railway was formed by the amalgamation under the Eastern and Midlands Railway (Amalgamation) Act 1882 (45 & 46 Vict. c. ccxxvii) of several small railways in the Isle of Ely, Cambridgeshire, Lincolnshire and Norfolk, England, including the Yarmouth and North Norfolk Railway, the Lynn and Fakenham Railway and the Yarmouth Union Railway. Many of these lines were built by contractors Wilkinson and Jarvis. In 1893 the Eastern and Midlands Railway became part of the Midland and Great Northern Joint Railway.

== Constituents ==
The constituents of the Eastern and Midlands Railway were:

- Peterborough, Wisbeach and Sutton Railway, opened 1866
- Midland and Eastern Railway (incorporating the Lynn and Sutton Bridge Railway, the Norwich and Spalding Railway, and the Spalding and Bourn Railway)
- Lynn and Fakenham Railway
- Yarmouth and North Norfolk Light Railway (incorporating the Great Yarmouth and Stalham Light Railway)
- Yarmouth Union Railway

Spelling variations

The spellings of some place names have changed since the 19th century (e.g. Wisbeach/Wisbech and Bourn/Bourne).

== Routes ==
Westbound from Kings Lynn

- Sutton Bridge - Wisbech North - Peterborough
- Sutton Bridge - Spalding - Bourne

Eastbound from Kings Lynn

- Fakenham West - Melton Constable - Norwich City
- Fakenham West - Melton Constable - Yarmouth Beach

== Locomotives ==
In 1884, William Marriott became the locomotive superintendent at the company's Melton Constable Railway Works. The railway's stock included:

- Two Fox, Walker 0-6-0ST locomotives (works numbers 338 and 339) which had been built for the Great Yarmouth and Stalham Light Railway in 1877.
- Seven 4-4-0T locomotives built by Hudswell Clarke for the Lynn and Fakenham Railway between 1878 and 1881.
- Fifteen Beyer Peacock 4-4-0 locomotives built 1882-1888
  - Four built for the Lynn & Fakenham Railway
  - Eleven built for the Eastern and Midlands Railway
- Eight Sharp Stewart 0-6-0T (Later 0-6-0T+T and 0-6-0) locomotives (ex-Cornwall Minerals Railway)

Three Black, Hawthorn 0-6-0ST locomotives named 'Ida', 'Holt' (number 6) & 'Aylsham' built for the GY&SLR.

== To the M&GN ==
The Eastern and Midlands Railway became a part of the Midland and Great Northern Joint Railway in 1893.
