= Thursford railway station =

Former railway station in Norfolk, England

Coordinates: 52.8624°N 0.9623°E

Thursford

General information
- Location: Thursford, North Norfolk, Norfolk; England
- Grid reference: TF994335
- Platforms: 2

Other information
- Status: Disused

History
- Pre-grouping: Lynn and Fakenham Railway; Midland and Great Northern Joint Railway
- Post-grouping: Midland and Great Northern Joint Railway; Eastern Region of British Railways

Key dates
- 19 January 1882: Opened
- 2 March 1959: Closed
Location

Thursford railway station was a station in Norfolk, England on the Midland and Great Northern Joint Railway line between Melton Constable and South Lynn. It was closed in 1959 along with the rest of the line. It served the settlement of Thursford, where Station Road remains as a reminder. The station was demolished after closure and the site is now occupied by a road the B1354.

Preceding station	Disused railways	Following station
Fakenham West; Line and station closed	Midland and Great Northern	Melton Constable; Line and station closed
	Future services	
Melton Constable; Line and station closed	Norfolk Orbital Railway	Fakenham; Line and station closed

== See also ==
- List of closed railway stations in Norfolk
