= Kelling Heath =

UK Site of Special Scientific Interest

Coordinates: 52.932°N 1.125°E

- Site of Special Scientific Interest
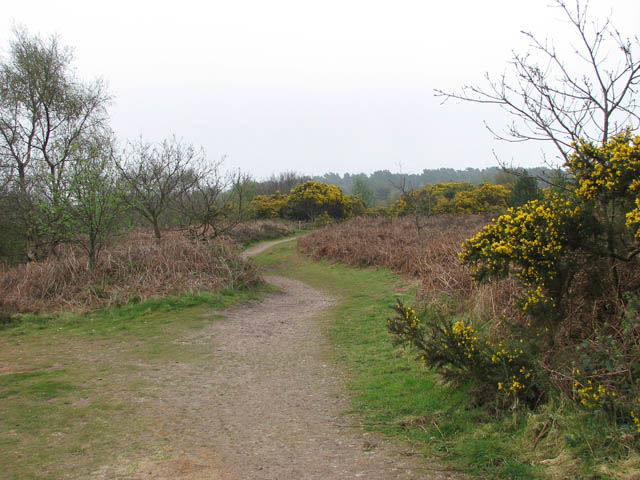
- Location of Kelling Heath.
- Area of search: Norfolk
- Grid reference: TG 101 418
- Interest: Biological
- Area: 89.4 hectares (221 acres)
- Notification date: 1986
- Location map: Magic Map

Kelling Heath is an 89.4-hectare (221-acre) biological Site of Special Scientific Interest between Holt and Weybourne in Norfolk, England. It is in the Norfolk Coast Area of Outstanding Natural Beauty.

== Geology ==
Kelling Heath lies on the Cromer Ridge, a glacial moraine formed by retreating glaciers at the end of the last Ice age. Together with nearby Salthouse Heath, it is one of two distinct outwash plains dating from different halt stages of the same glaciation. Kelling Heath provides perhaps the best example of a glacial outwash plain in England. Both sites have steep ice-contact slopes and are dissected by deep dry valleys, and are geomorphological sites of national importance.

== Natural history ==
The heath is described by Natural England as 'a fine example of oceanic heathland'. The vegetation is typical of dry, acid heath and is dominated by heather, bell heather, western gorse, gorse and bracken, with areas of mixed woodland. A wide variety of heathland birds nest on the site, including nightjar, whitethroat and tree pipit. The dry conditions are favourable to reptiles such as common lizard and adder.

The heath is bisected by the North Norfolk Railway, which has a Kelling Heath Halt. There is a Holiday Park adjoining the heath.
