= Melton Constable railway station =

Former railway station in Norfolk, England

Coordinates: 52.856309°N 1.032424°E

Melton Constable
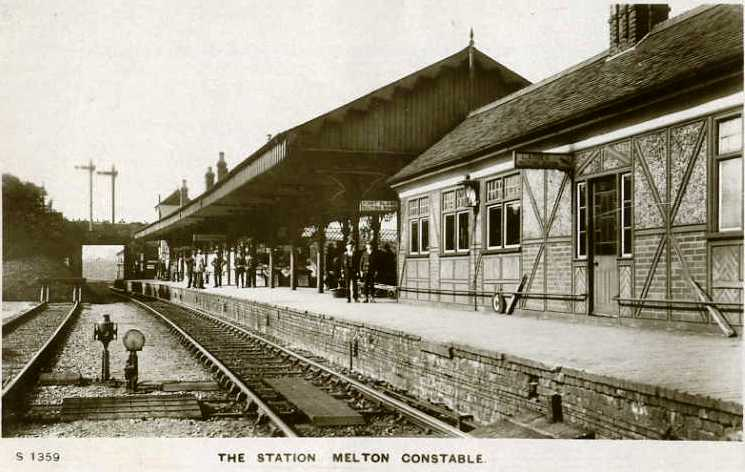

General information
- Location: Melton Constable, North Norfolk; England
- Grid reference: TG042330
- Platforms: 2

Other information
- Status: Disused

History
- Original company: Lynn and Fakenham Railway
- Pre-grouping: Midland and Great Northern Joint Railway
- Post-grouping: Midland and Great Northern Joint Railway; Eastern Region of British Railways

Key dates
- 19 January 1882: Opened
- December 1936: Closure of Melton works
- 6 April 1964: Closed to passengers
- 28 December 1964: Closed to freight
Location

Melton Constable was a railway station on the Midland and Great Northern Railway which served the North Norfolk village of Melton Constable from 1882 to 1964. Notwithstanding its rural location, the station became an important railway centre with lines converging from all directions providing connections to key East Anglian towns such as King's Lynn, Norwich, Cromer, Fakenham, Yarmouth and Lowestoft. Although long since demolished, there is a possibility that the station may yet be resurrected as part of the proposed Norfolk Orbital Railway.

== History ==
=== Opening and early years ===
The Lynn and Fakenham Railway (Extensions) Act 1880 (43 & 44 Vict. c. clxv) authorised the construction of a railway from Fakenham to Norwich via Melton Constable, followed by a second line east from Melton to North Walsham. The scheme had been born of a desire amongst North Norfolk landowners, including notably the 5th Marquis Townsend of Raynham Hall. It was intended by the original promoters to be a 'Farmer's Line'. The project was taken over by Wilkinson & Jarvis, civil engineers contractors who turned the branch line idea into a 'through' railway from Yarmouth and Norwich to King's Lynn. It provided a shorter route from North Norfolk to King's Lynn than that provided by the Great Eastern Railway. The Lynn and Fakenham Railway began services from King's Lynn railway station to Fakenham on 6 August 1880. The extension to Norwich was opened to traffic in December 1882. The connection to North Walsham was completed on 5 April 1883 thereby enabling through-running to Great Yarmouth over a line constructed by the Yarmouth & North Norfolk Light Railway, some three months after the Lynn & Fakenham Railway, the Yarmouth & North Norfolk and other small companies had merged to form the Eastern and Midlands Railway.

Both the Lynn and Fakenham and the Yarmouth and North Norfolk lines were built by Messrs Wilkinson & Jarvis of London who had raised the necessary funds through a mixture of bonds, debentures and mortgages, hoping that their speculative investment would pay off when a larger railway company would purchase the line. One of their employees was William Marriott who became engineer to the Eastern and Midlands Railway in 1883; he would later play a key role in the development of Melton Constable where he lived for some years. He kept his position when the Eastern and Midlands Railway was taken over in 1893 by the Midland & Great Northern Joint Railway (M&GN).

=== Growth of Melton Constable ===
From a population of 118 in 1881, Melton Constable grew rapidly with the arrival of the railway to reach a figure of 1,157 in 1911. The construction of a railway junction and establishment of a railway works transformed a small parish of 19 houses into what became known as the "Crewe of North Norfolk". Due to its central location on the M&GN, Melton Constable became, after King's Lynn, one of the two main centres from which the M&GN was controlled; it was the line's engineering nerve centre from where an extensive 14-acre (57,000 m^{2}) locomotive works operated over 180 miles (290 km) of track, building and repairing locomotives and catering for the civil engineering needs of the line. All M&GN traffic from and to the west had to pass through Melton Constable where trains were divided or made-up before proceeding west, where goods trains were shunted and assembled.

To attract and retain workers to such an isolated location, the railway company engaged a contractor to construct housing in the nearby parish of Burgh Parva. The first street to be built in 1882 was Melton Street followed by Astley Terrace where poor-quality houses costing £150 each were built; later houses in Colville Road and Briston Road are of better quality and date from the M&GN's takeover of the line and the availability of more funds. Architecturally, the red-brick and slate-roofed terraced housing had more in common with an East Midlands industrial town, with narrow streets and small front gardens which gave the area a particular character. The M&GN's gasworks at the bottom of Melton Street lit the establishment, with the coal needed for the plant being supplied by rail via a siding connection from the station's goods yard headshunt. Other amenities included a school, recreational facilities, gasworks and a sewerage station.

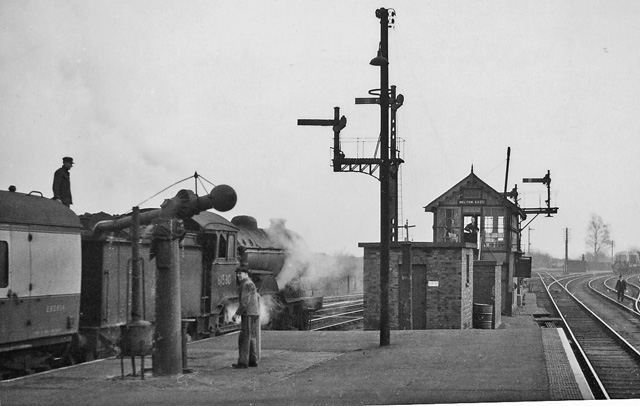
Melton Constable in 1958

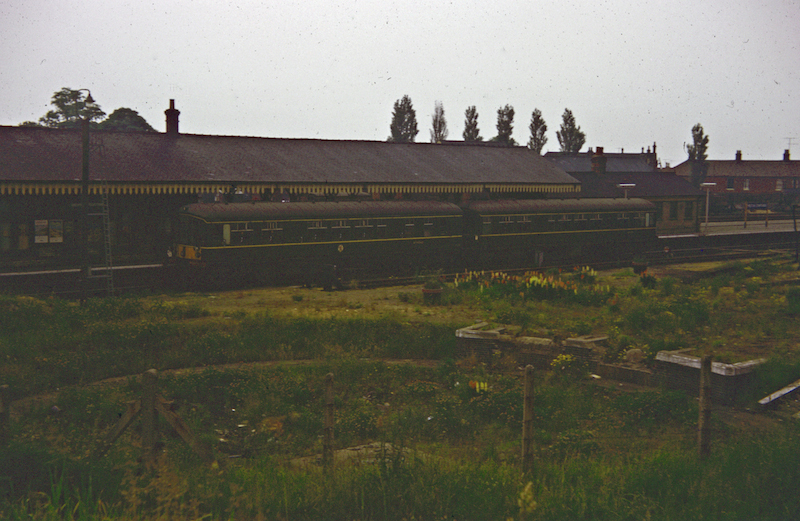
Melton Constable in July 1963

=== Station buildings ===
The station buildings were located close to the great hall at Melton Constable Hall made famous by its use in the film The Go Between. The land on which the station was built on had been donated by Lord Hastings who was in return provided with a specially-appointed waiting room with an adjoining short platform. Other than this private platform, the station was equipped with a single 800 feet (240 m) island platform with through tracks on either side.

Access to the platform was via a covered staircase which descended from an adjacent road overbridge to reach a long, single-storey station building containing the booking office and refreshment room. At the eastern end of the platform, there was a single-storey brick public waiting room and toilet block, which was subsequently rebuilt with an outer casing of concrete blocks. The main station building was constructed using yellow brickwork, with the exterior woodwork painted in a two-tone green and cream colour when the London and North Eastern Railway took over operation of the M&GN. The platform was largely covered by a long canopy supported by metal spandrels bearing the initials "CNR", a reference to the failed Central Norfolk Railway scheme. A trap door on the platform surface led to the station cellars.

The station and junctions were controlled by two signal boxes at each end of the station and known as "Melton East" and "Melton West" boxes. They controlled typical M&GN somersault signals mounted on square posts, which were in some cases moulded from concrete.

=== Locomotive Works ===
The works were situated to the south of the main station buildings and opened in 1883. It was principally a locomotive repair establishment, with the stock accessing the works via a headshunt connection beside the Melton to Norwich line. William Marriott and his workforce carried out several major rebuilding operations at the works, including the reboilering of the M&GN's 4-4-0 and 0-6-0 engines, progressively enlarging them. Up to 12 engines could be housed in the works' three-road engine shed which was situated between the passenger station and the works. Part of the works was dedicated to the large scale production of concrete mouldings which were innovatively used by Marriott in the construction of signals and building blocks. The works closed in 1936 resulting in a significant reduction of activity at Melton Constable.

=== Decline and closure ===
Operation of the M&GN was taken over by the London and North Eastern Railway on 1 October 1936 which transferred all locomotive operations to its Stratford works as part of a move to rationalise functions of the Joint system. Melton Constable Works ceased to repair locomotives after this date, but the facilities continued to be used for wagon repairs and the scrapping of redundant rolling stock. Further rationalisation in 1945 left Melton Constable as a wagon sheet works, whilst declining traffic served to highlight the duplication of facilities between the M&GN and other Great Eastern lines. Most of the M&GN closed on 28 February 1959, leaving Melton Constable as the terminus of a branch from Sheringham until 4 April 1964 when it was closed to passengers.

== Present and future ==
Melton Constable is today a rather smaller village with around 500 inhabitants. The station was demolished in 1971, to be replaced by a telephone exchange. Two of the ornamental spandrels that held up the station roof are incorporated into the bus shelter on the B1354 Briston Road. The land of the old railway works is now an industrial estate and the sidings an artisan bakery, but a number of the old buildings have been retained. A water tower still exists above the factory area and still bears the traces of repaired shrapnel holes sustained during a Second World War air raid.

The Norfolk Orbital Railway has long-term plans to restore the line to Melton Constable.

== Bibliography ==
- Adderson, R.; Kenworthy, G. (2007). Branch Lines around Cromer. Midhurst, West Sussex: Middleton Press. ISBN 978-1-901706-26-0.
- Adderson, R.; Kenworthy, G. (2007). Melton Constable to Yarmouth Beach. Midhurst, West Sussex: Middleton Press. ISBN 978-1-906008-03-1.
- Butt, R.V.J. (1995). The Directory of Railway Stations. Sparkford, Somerset: Patrick Stephens Ltd. ISBN 1-85260-508-1.
- Clark, M.J. (1990). Midland & Great Northern Joint Railway; Railway World Special. Shepperton, Walton-on-Thames: Ian Allan Ltd. ISBN 0-7110-1900-2.
- Clinker, C.R. (October 1978). Clinker's Register of Closed Passenger Stations and Goods Depots in England, Scotland and Wales 1830-1977. Bristol: Avon-AngliA Publications & Services. ISBN 0-905466-19-5.
- Jenkins, Stanley C. (1991). The Melton Constable to Cromer Branch. Headington, Oxford: The Oakwood Press. ISBN 0-85361-419-9.
- Joby, R.S. (1985). Forgotten Railways: Vol. 7 East Anglia. Newton Abbott, Devon: David & Charles. ISBN 0-946537-25-9.
- Oppitz, Leslie (1999). Lost Railways of East Anglia (Lost Railways). Newbury, Berkshire: Countryside Books. ISBN 1-85306-595-1.

Preceding station	Disused railways	Following station
Hindolvestone; Line and station closed	Midland and Great Northern; Norwich Branch	Holt; Line and station closed
Thursford; Line and station closed	Midland and Great Northern; Yarmouth Line	Corpusty and Saxthorpe; Line and station closed
Holt; Line and station closed	Midland and Great Northern; Cromer Branch	Terminus
	Future services	
Holt; Line and station closed	Norfolk Orbital Railway	Thursford; Line and station closed
