= William Marriott (engineer) =

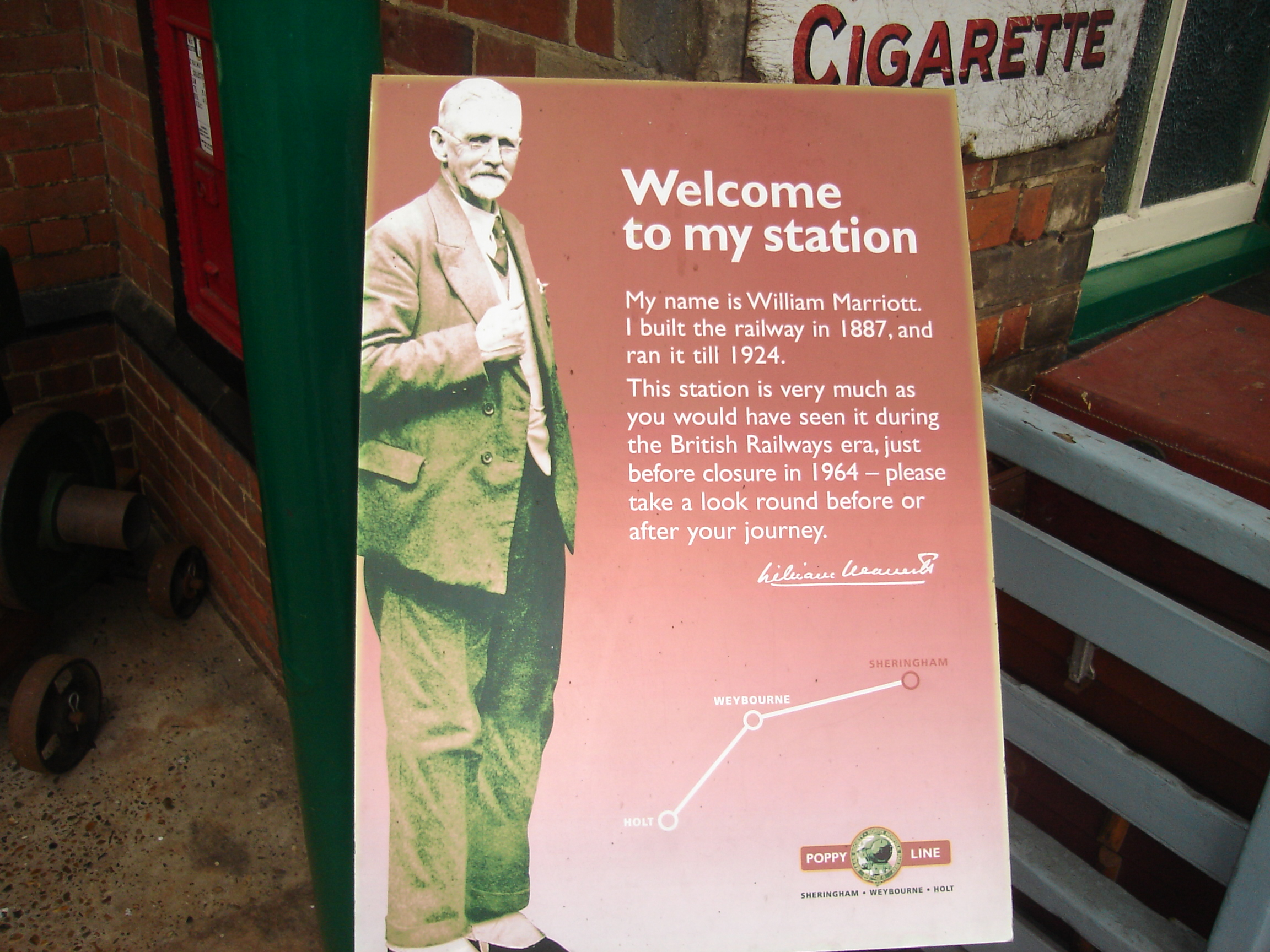
Poster of William Marriott at Sheringham railway station

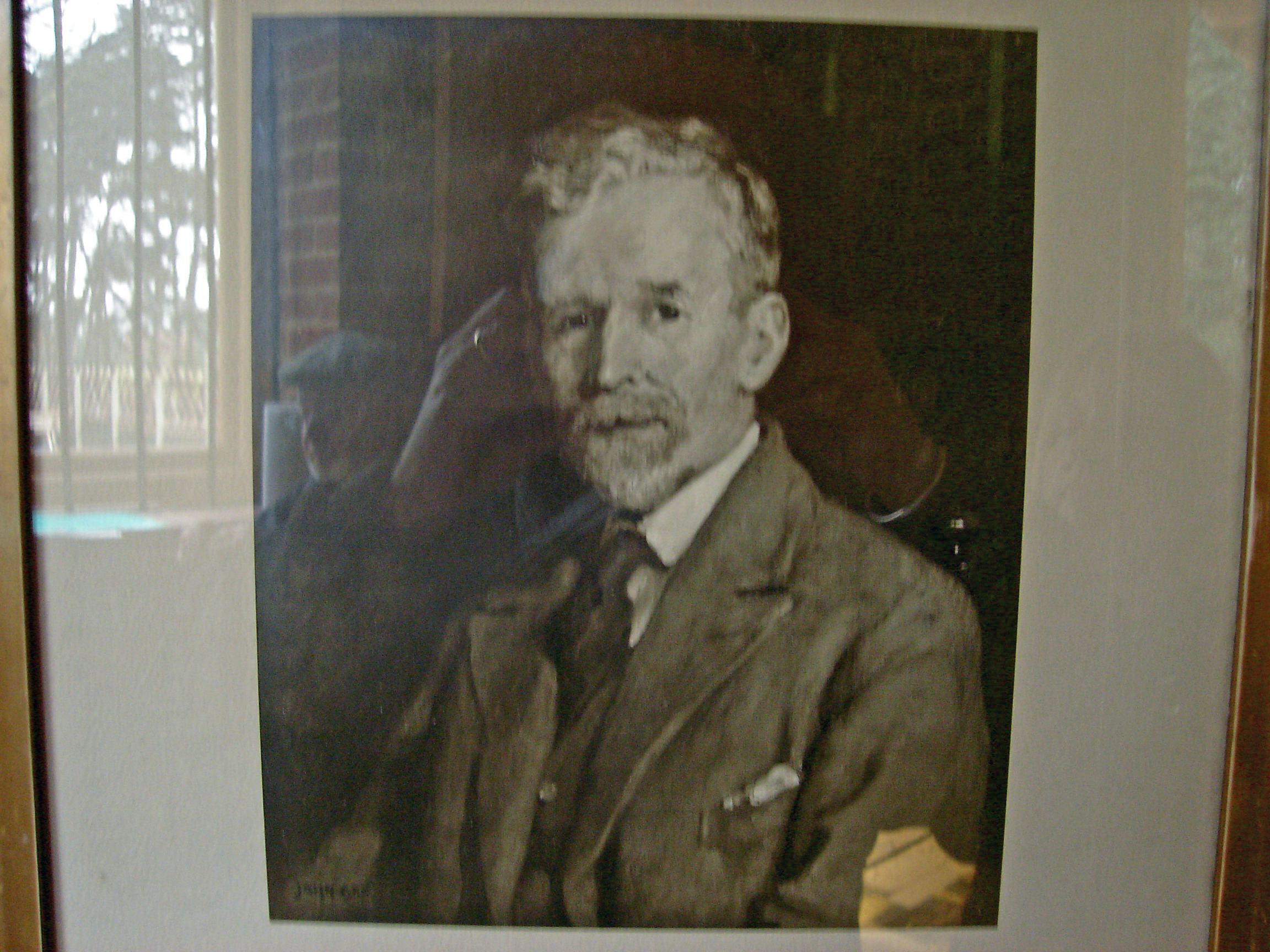
Portrait of Marriott on public display at the William Marriott Museum

William Marriott (1857 – 17 November 1943) was the engineer, locomotive superintendent and traffic manager of the Midland & Great Northern Joint Railway (M&GN)

Marriott was born at Basel, Switzerland where his father was a professor of English at the University of Basel. He was orphaned in 1868 and was brought to live in Bideford, receiving an education in England and on the continent. He served an apprenticeship with Ransomes & Rapier Ltd in Ipswich from 1875 to 1879 and as a draughtsman in 1880. He left Ransomes in 1881 to become an assistant engineer with Wilkinson & Jarvis Ltd completing a six-week unpaid trial period on the Yarmouth & North Norfolk Railway at Yarmouth. He was offered a permanent post which he accepted, and in 1883 he became the civil engineer and in 1884 the locomotive superintendent of the Eastern & Midlands Railway. This company was the amalgamation of all the Wilkinson & Jarvis lines in Norfolk, including both the Yarmouth & North Norfolk Railway and the Lynn & Fakenham Railway. At the time he was possibly the youngest engineer of a public railway since the 1850s. When the Midland Railway and the Great Northern Railway jointly purchased the Eastern & Midlands Railway in 1893, from which time it was known as the Midland & Great Northern Joint Railway, he was expecting to become traffic manager as well, but was passed over in favour of an outside appointment. After many years service, improving the line and developing the use of reinforced concrete, he was finally appointed as the railway's traffic manager in 1919, in which post he remained until his retirement on 31 December 1924. He died in Sheringham on 17 November 1943.

== North Norfolk Railway ==
A section of the M&GN railway formerly run by Marriott has been preserved by volunteers as the North Norfolk Railway, popularly known as the Poppy Line. This organisation also runs the William Marriott Museum which is located at Holt station. The museum houses railway artifacts relating to Marriott and the M&GN railway.

== Legacy ==
Marriott's Way, a long distance footpath that follows the route of two former (M&GN) lines in Norfolk, takes its name from him.

Thorpe Marriott, a residential development at Taverham, bears his name.
