= Melton Constable =

Village in Norfolk, England

Coordinates: 52°51′23″N 1°02′16″E

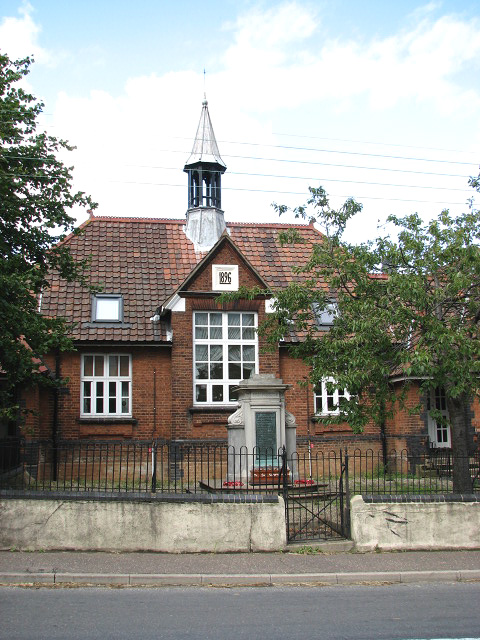
- The war memorial and the former elementary school

- Location within Norfolk
- Area: 6.96 km^{2} (2.69 sq mi)
- Population: 618 (2011)
  - Density: 89/km^{2} (230/sq mi)
- OS grid reference: TG042331
- Civil parish: Melton Constable
- District: North Norfolk
- Shire county: Norfolk
- Region: East
- Country: England
- Sovereign state: United Kingdom
- Post town: MELTON CONSTABLE
- Postcode district: NR24
- Dialling code: 01263
- Police: Norfolk
- Fire: Norfolk
- Ambulance: East of England
- UK Parliament: North Norfolk

Melton Constable is a village and civil parish in the North Norfolk district of the county of Norfolk, England. It covers an area of 6.96 km^{2} (2.69 sq mi) and had a population of 518 in 225 households at the 2001 census. The population had increased to 618 at the 2011 Census. For the purposes of local government, it falls within the district of North Norfolk. The village sits on fairly high ground south-west of Holt.

== History ==
The place-name Melton Constable is first attested in the Domesday Book of 1086, where it appears as Maeltuna. This may mean either 'middle town' or 'mill town'. There is a reference to 'Constabularius de Melton' in 1197, as the land was held by the constable of the bishop of Norwich.

== Melton Constable Hall ==
Melton Constable Hall is regarded as the finest specimen of the Christopher Wren style of house.

== St Peter Church ==
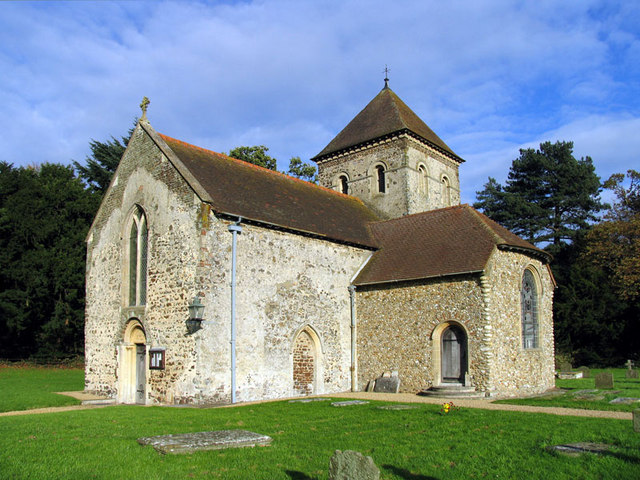
St Peter's Church

St Peter's, Melton Constable, the Church of England parish church, is located within Melton Constable park; it is a Grade I listed building. The church contains many monuments to the Astley family, who formerly resided at Melton Constable Hall.

== 1981 Tornado ==
The village was struck by an F0/T1 tornado on 23 November 1981, as part of the record-breaking nationwide tornado outbreak on that day.

== River Bure ==
The River Bure has its source in the parish, just south of the village, roughly half-way between the village and the parish church.

== Railway ==
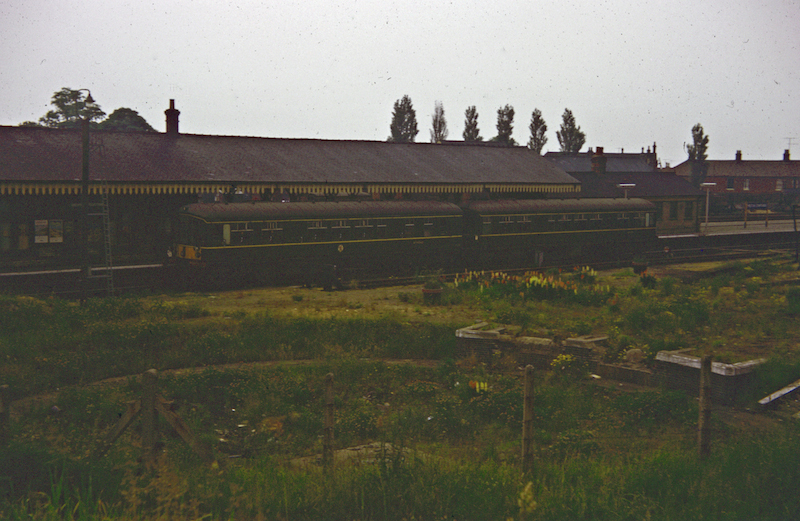
Melton Constable station in July 1963, being served by a diesel multiple unit

Melton Constable reached its heyday about 1911; in the census of that year, it had a population of 1,157. It was a new town built in 1880s at the junction of four railway lines, which came from Cromer, North Walsham, King's Lynn and Norwich and linked Norfolk to the Midlands. Melton Constable railway station, with a platform 800 feet (240 m) long, was constructed with a specially-appointed waiting room for Lord Hastings, the local squire. The Midland & Great Northern Joint Railway (M&GNJR)'s main workshops and factory were also situated in the village, helping to give it the character of a rural industrialised village (rather similar to Woodford Halse in Northamptonshire). The workshops were often called the Crewe Works of North Norfolk. When in M&GNJR hands, the works built 19 steam locomotives.

Under LNER ownership, the works was gradually degraded until 1934 when it closed completely. Between 1959 and 1964, British Railways chose to close the lines, withdrawing both passenger and goods services from Melton Constable, which resulted in the slow decline of the village; it now lies stranded in the middle of a vast agricultural area which uses other forms of transport. In 1971, the station was demolished and the works were converted into an industrial estate; several railway buildings are extant and have found other uses.

The railways may eventually return to Melton Constable in future, as part of the Norfolk Orbital Railway's plans to restore former railway lines.

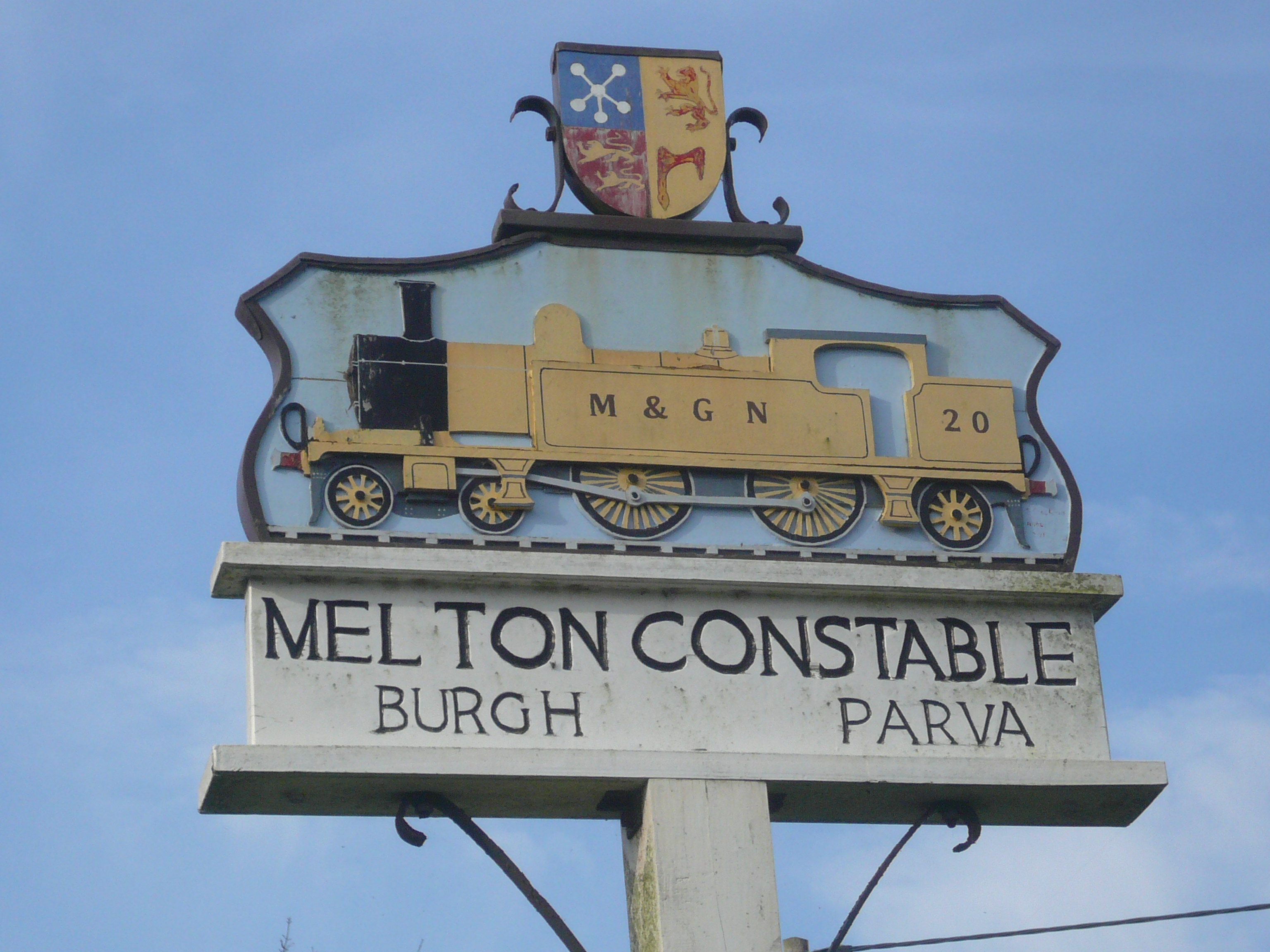
Melton Constable village sign

== Burgh Parva ==
The parish of Melton Constable includes the deserted former parish of Burgh Parva, notable for its ruined church and tin tabernacle replacement.
