= Norfolk Orbital Railway =

Proposed rail project in Norfolk, England

The Holt, Melton Constable and Fakenham Railway Company (Norfolk Orbital Railway)
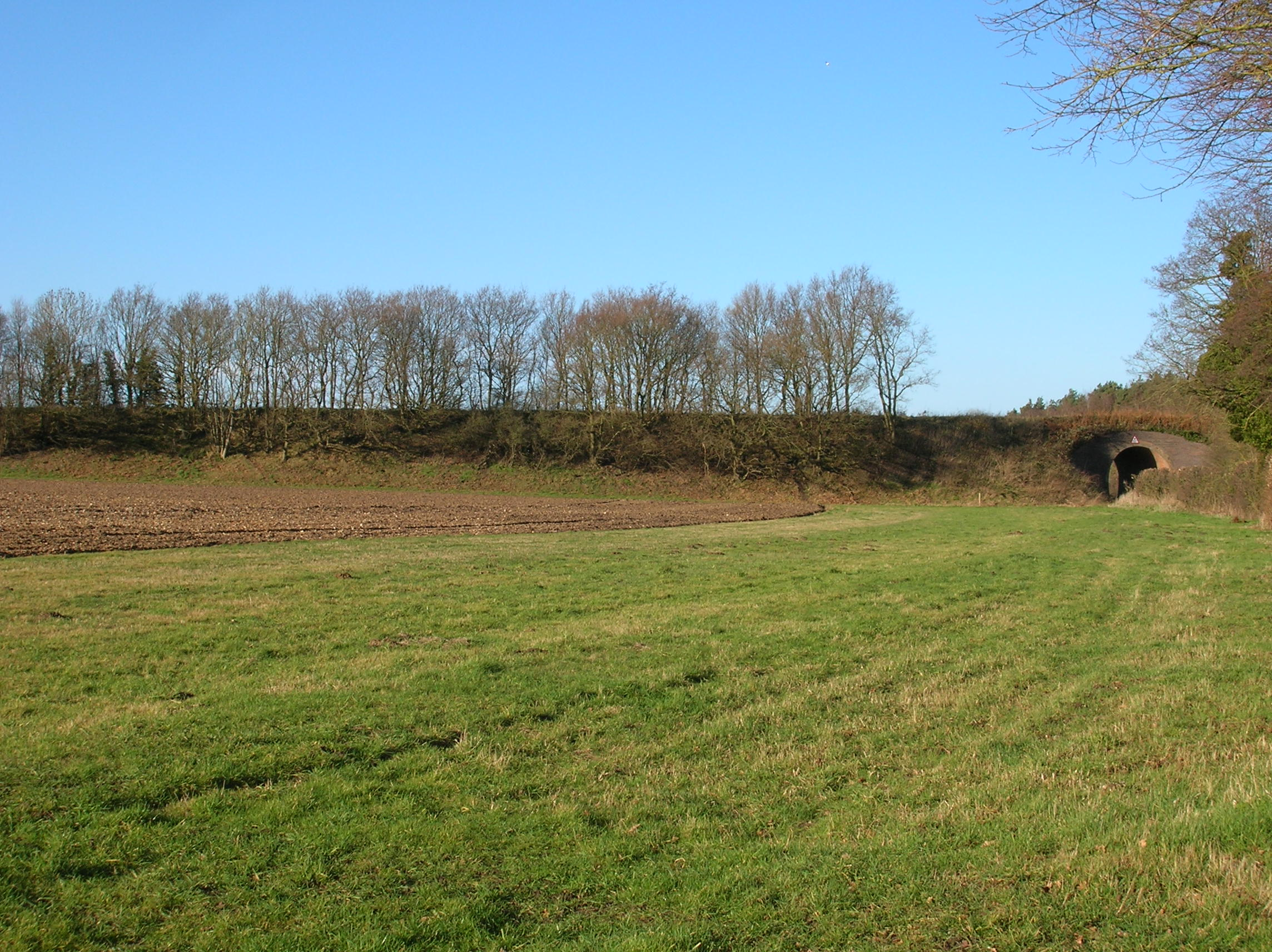
- Part of the proposed route, near Stody.

Overview
- Status: Proposed
- Locale: East of England
- Website: http://www.norfolk-orbital-railway.co.uk/

Service
- Type: Regional rail

Technical
- Track length: 0 miles (0.00 km)
- Track gauge: 4 ft 8 1/2 in (1,435 mm)

The Norfolk Orbital Railway – as the Holt, Melton Constable and Fakenham Railway Company – is a proposed rail project in Norfolk, England, which is planning to bring a new rail connection to North and Mid Norfolk.

The proposed line would link stations at Sheringham and Wymondham on the national rail network by using tracks of the two standard gauge heritage railways in the county, and restoring the former Midland and Great Northern Joint Railway line between Holt and Fakenham, creating a circular route that could be used by passenger services.

The heritage lines affected are Mid-Norfolk Railway and the North Norfolk Railway, with the route including stations on both of these lines as well as on part of National Rail network and on a disused section between County School and Holt. These are both entirely separate enterprises.

== History ==
The line from Fakenham to Melton Constable was built by the Lynn and Fakenham Railway, later the Midland and Great Northern Joint Railway's main line from Peterborough to Great Yarmouth. The line from Melton Constable to Holt was part of the M&GN branch line to Cromer. The section between County School and Fakenham was part of the Norfolk Railway, later the Great Eastern Railway Wymondham to Wells Branch.

The M&GN main line closed to passengers in February 1959. The branch line remained open, operated as part of the line from Norwich Thorpe, when it was cut back to Sheringham in 1964. The passenger service on the GER line from Fakenham ended in 1964, with the line finally closing in the 1980s.

== Route ==
The route is proposed to run from Sheringham to Dereham via Holt and Fakenham.

In January 2019, Campaign for Better Transport released a report listing the line as Priority 2 for reopening, with Priority 2 being described as "feasible projects which require further development or changed circumstances (for example, housing development proposals) to assist them in being taken forward". The route south from Fakenham, forming part of this scheme, is protected by North Norfolk District Council from any development that would be prejudicial to the restoration of a railway line

== Developments ==
=== The Midland & Great Northern section ===
==== The Holt link ====
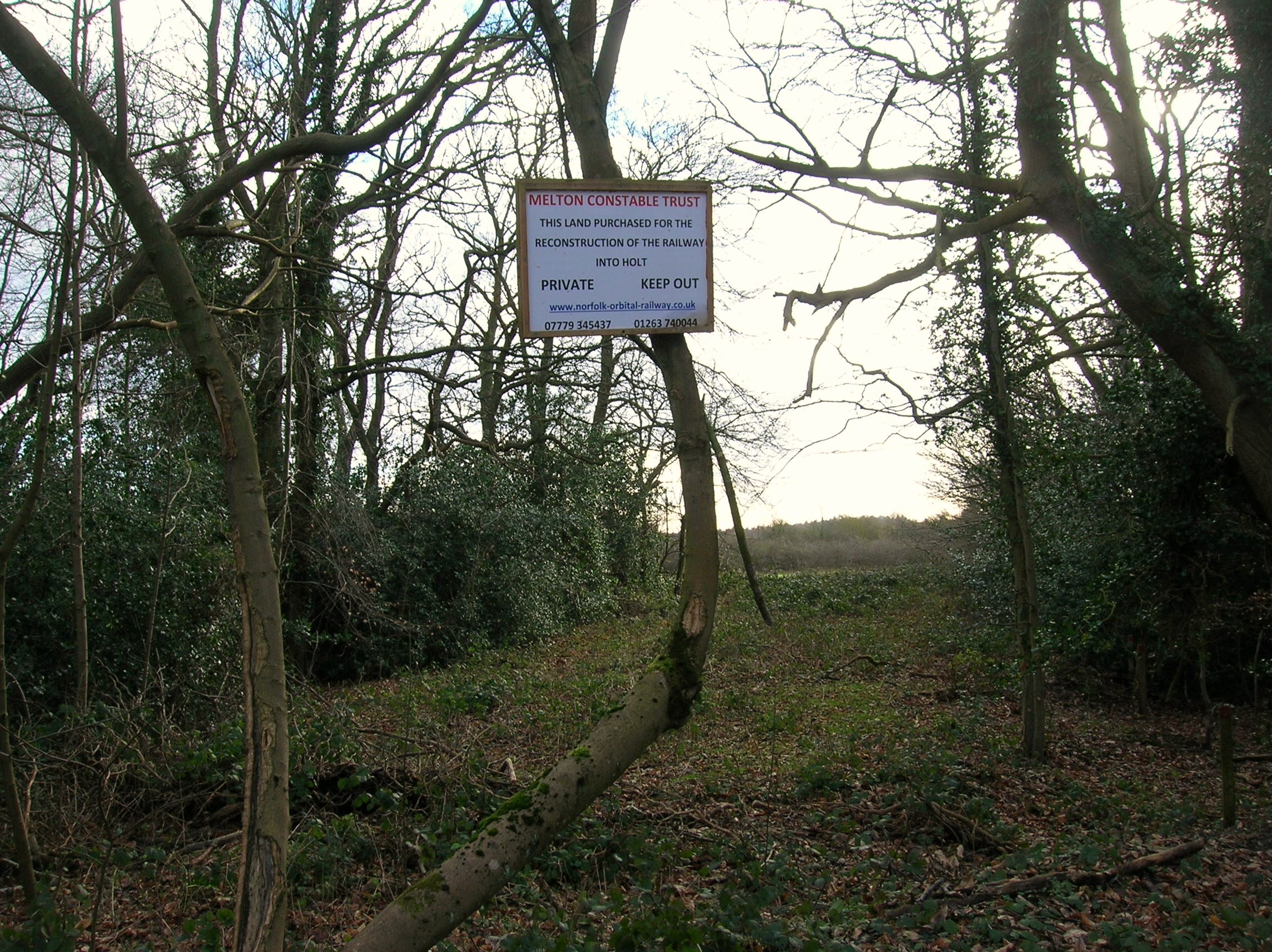
The NOR trackbed at Holt.

The first section of the formation to be purchased by the Norfolk Orbital Railway is located between the North Norfolk Railway's Holt station site and the town bypass, which was built on the railway formation. The NOR plans would see a line relaid on the wide verge beside the road.

The company paid £25,000 for the 50-yard stretch of former track bed, and erected a small sign on a tree to indicate that it is now back in railway ownership. The section of formation was cleared of vegetation in 2016

There is much debate on whether getting to the centre of Holt, let alone through the town to the other side, is actually feasible, or even possible, with the need to cross three roads, one of which is an A road.

=== The Great Eastern section ===
==== Fakenham Land ====
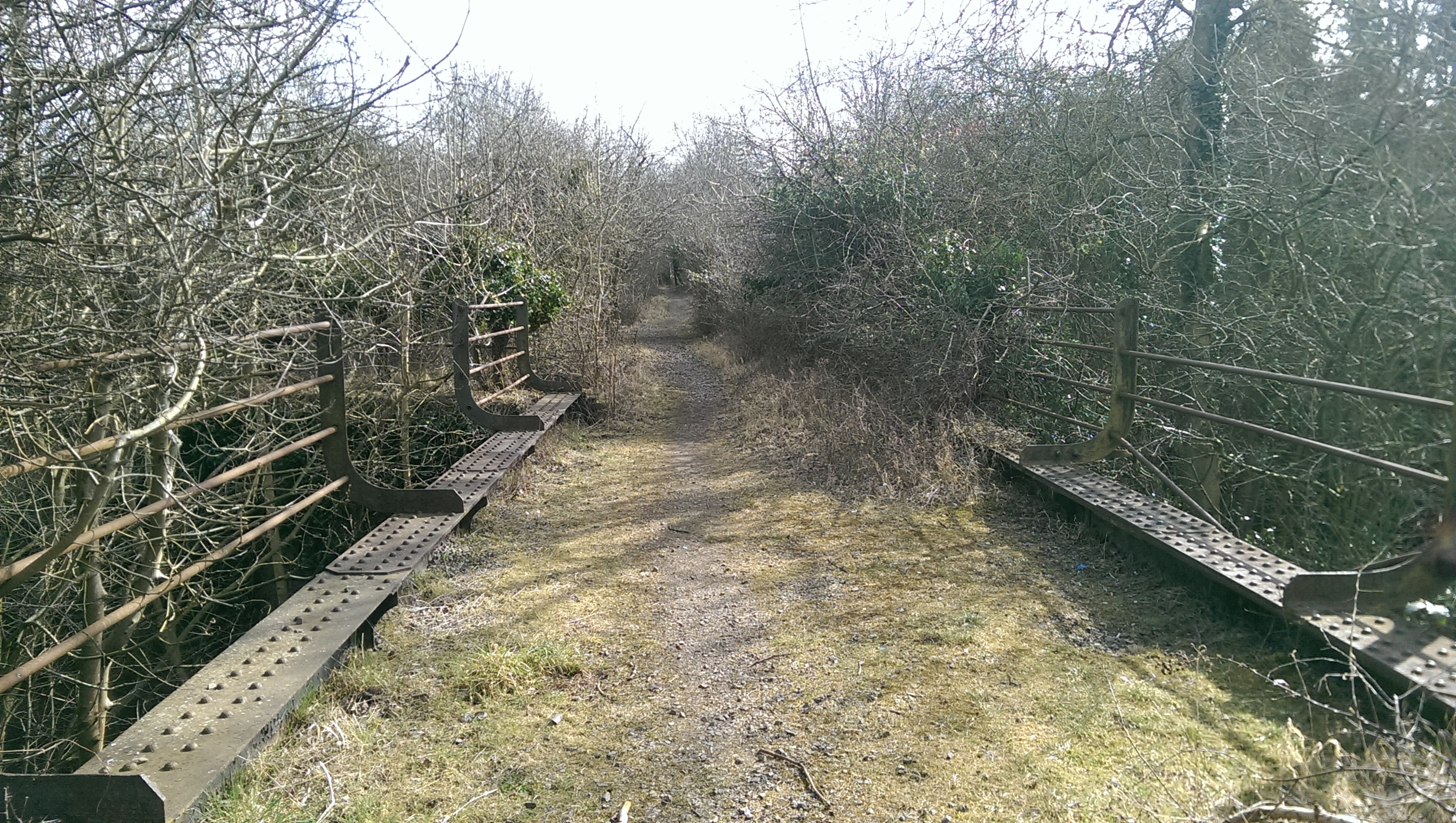
NOR Bridge 1715 at Fakenham.

In 2009 the Norfolk Orbital Railway attempted to secure a section of the railway formation in Fakenham, but was outbid by a London developer who claimed not to know of the project. The land was once again auctioned on 10 December 2014, and was secured for the railway project for £24,000.

In 2016 the project was awarded £60,000 from the Heritage Lottery Fund to help repair the Fakenham bridges, provide an education resource, equipment for the Fakenham Area Conservation Team and to create a walk along the preserved formation for people to enjoy. The walkway is currently maintained by the conservation team, but has also suffered from the attention of local vandals. In August 2019 the Lottery-funded restoration of the formation was completed, with local councillors and land-owners invited to a meeting at County School railway station, followed by a tour of the restored formation footpath.

== External links and references ==
- Norfolk Orbital Railway Website
- BBC4 TV Beeching's Tracks-East
