= National nature reserves in Norfolk =

Nature reserves

National nature reserves in Norfolk, England are established by Natural England and managed by it or by non-governmental organisations such as the Norfolk Wildlife Trust, the Royal Society for the Protection of Birds, and the National Trust.

== List of reserves ==
A list of national nature reserves in Norfolk:

- Ant Broads & Marshes NNR (in The Broads National Park)
- Blakeney NNR, including Blakeney Point
- Brettenham Heath NNR
- Bure Marshes NNR (in The Broads National Park)
- Calthorpe Broad NNR (in The Broads National Park)
- Dersingham Bog NNR
- Foxley Wood NNR
- Heigham Holmes
- Hickling Broad NNR (in The Broads National Park)
- Holkham NNR
- Holme Dunes NNR
- Ludham - Potter Heigham NNR (in The Broads National Park)
- Martham Broad NNR (in The Broads National Park)
- Mid-Yare NNR (in The Broads National Park)
- Redgrave and Lopham Fen
- Roydon Common NNR
- Scolt Head Island NNR
- Swanton Novers NNR
- The Wash NNR
- Weeting Heath NNR
- Winterton Dunes NNR
