= Catfield Fen Reserve =

Coordinates: 52.7368°N 1.5085°E

Catfield Fen is a wetland nature reserve near Catfield and Ludham in the county of Norfolk, England. The fen has an area of about 63 hectares (160 acres) that is part of a larger low-lying wetland, located in the Ant Broads and Marshes Site of Special Scientific Interest (SSSI), within the Broads Special Area of Conservation.

Butterfly Conservation owns the western part of the fen comprising 24 hectares (59 acres), part of the Ant Broads & Marshes National Nature Reserve, and it is managed on the Butterfly Conservation's behalf by the Royal Society for the Protection of Birds. The remainder is owned privately by the Catfield Hall Estate.

For safety reasons, the nature reserve is not open to the public, but it can be viewed from Fenside Lane, Catfield, which runs along the northern edge of the fen. Barton Broad and the River Ant are the western and south-western edges of the fen.

== History ==
The nature reserve was established by the conservationist landowner Keith Arundel McDougall, son of Douglas McDougall of the McDougall of Makerstoun family. Catfield Fen is well known amongst Broadland ecologists as one of the most important areas of fen in the United Kingdom. The wide variety of plant communities support many rare species. The site is especially important for invertebrates, with an internationally important aquatic beetle assemblage including many Red Data Book species. Other rare invertebrates include the swallowtail butterfly, the lesser water measurer, small dotted footman moth and Fenn's wainscot moth. It is the finest examples of calcareous fen in western Europe, home to 2,500 species.

Catfield Fen also has important populations of many rare plants, of particular note are the fen orchid, the round leaved wintergreen, crested buckler fern and milk parsley. The latter being the food plant of the swallowtail butterfly.

Catfield Fen has appeared in local media in 2013 and 2014 due to concerns that the site may be being affected by local agricultural water abstraction. There are two abstraction licenses up for renewal in 2014 which are being considered by the Environment Agency. Site managers, local ecologist, the Broads Authority and Natural England have all raised concerns that the hydrological modelling carried out by the Environment Agency is insufficient to conclude that it will have no significant effect on the integrity of the site.

In 2021, Anglian Water completed a £9 million project to help protect the reserve, building a pipeline that would reduce the need to take local water supply from a borehole in the area. By 2025, extraction should be reduced to 84 million litres a day.

On 9 October 2026, the High Court ruled in a judicial review, brought by the owner of the Catfield Hall Estate, that Natural England had failed in its statutory duty to protect Catfield Fen from pollution including nitrates and phosphates washed in from arable fields on the north side of Fenside Lane. Lady Justice Lieven ruled that the required action had been "the most basic level of common sense".
