= Catfield =

Village in Norfolk, England

Coordinates: 52.740°N 1.535°E

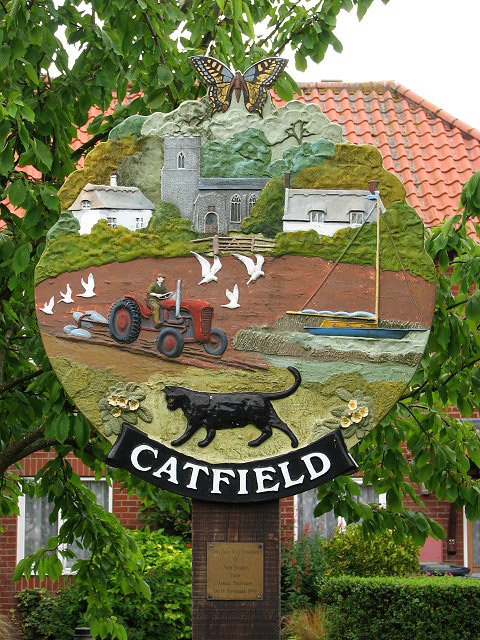
- Catfield Village Sign

- Location within Norfolk
- Area: 10.01 km^{2} (3.86 sq mi)
- Population: 983 (parish, 2021 census)
  - Density: 98/km^{2} (250/sq mi)
- OS grid reference: TG380210
  - London: 136 miles (219 km)
- Civil parish: Catfield
- District: North Norfolk
- Shire county: Norfolk
- Region: East
- Country: England
- Sovereign state: United Kingdom
- Post town: GREAT YARMOUTH
- Postcode district: NR29
- Dialling code: 01692
- Police: Norfolk
- Fire: Norfolk
- Ambulance: East of England
- UK Parliament: North Norfolk

Catfield is a village and civil parish in the English county of Norfolk. It is 2 miles (3.2 km) south of Stalham, 12 miles (19 km) north-west of Great Yarmouth, and 12 miles (19 km) north-east of Norwich. At the 2021 census the parish a population of 983, an increase from 943 at the 2011 census.

Parts of the parish are in the Norfolk Broads, with it extending eastward to include parts of Hickling Broad, and to the west to Catfield Fen Reserve and beyond to the River Ant and edge of Barton Broad.

The A149 road runs through the parish, bypassing the village of Catfield along the route of the former Midland and Great Northern railway line between Melton Constable and Yarmouth Beach railway station. Catfield railway station, which was just outside the parish boundary, operated from 1880 until its closure in 1959.

== History ==
Catfield's name is from the Old English for "open land frequented by wild cats" or "land owned by Kati". In the Domesday Book the village is described as a settlement of 31 households in the hundred of Happing. The land was divided between the estates of Alan of Brittany and Roger Bigod.

Catfield Hall, built in the mid 18th century and located to the south-west of the current village, is a Grade II listed building.

Catfield water tower was built in 1980 and was the first British water tower where the central shaft was built entirely from concrete.

== All Saints' Church ==
Catfield's parish church dates from the 15th century, although it is probably built on the site of an earlier church. It is Grade I listed and has an elaborately painted rood screen depicting various kings and saints, as well as a set of royal arms which dates from the Georgian era but was painted over in the reign of Queen Victoria.

== Notable people ==
- Harry Cox (1885–1971) farmworker and folk-singer, died in Catfield.
