= Smallburgh Fen =

Protected area in Norfolk, England

Coordinates: 52.768°N 1.446°E

- Site of Special Scientific Interest
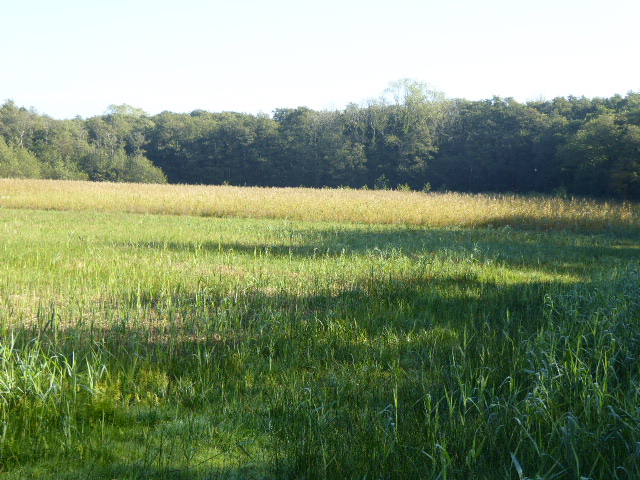
- Location of Smallburgh Fen.
- Area of search: Norfolk
- Grid reference: TG 326 245
- Interest: Biological
- Area: 7.6 hectares (19 acres)
- Notification date: 1985
- Location map: Magic Map

Smallburgh Fen is a 7.6-hectare (19-acre) biological Site of Special Scientific Interest in Smallburgh in Norfolk, United Kingdom. It is part of the Broadland Ramsar site and Special Protection Area, and The Broads Special Area of Conservation. It is also a Nature Conservation Review site, Grade 2.

This spring-fed fen site is in the valley of a tributary of the River Ant. The diverse flora includes several rare species, including the only known locality in the county for the moss Bracthythecium mildeanum. There is also an area of alder carr.

There is access to the site by a short track from Union Street.
