= East Ruston Common =

Nature reserve in Norfolk, UK

Coordinates: 52.799°N 1.473°E

- Site of Special Scientific Interest
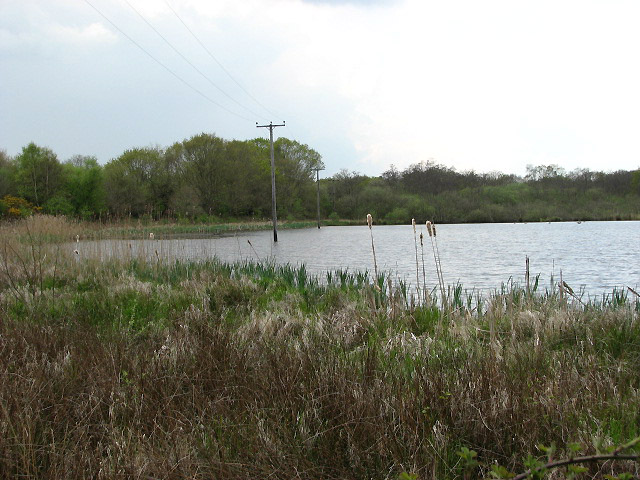
- Location of East Ruston Common.
- Area of search: Norfolk
- Grid reference: TG 342 280
- Interest: Biological
- Area: 34.5 hectares (85 acres)
- Notification date: 1986
- Location map: Magic Map

East Ruston Common is a 34.5-hectare (85-acre) biological Site of Special Scientific Interest south-east of North Walsham in Norfolk, England.

This is an area of unimproved fen, heath and carr woodland in the valley of a tributary of the River Ant. it is the only known English locality for the rare spider acanthophyma gowerensis and it also has another nationally rare spider, hygrolycosa rubrofasciata.

There is public access to the common.
