= Ant Broads & Marshes National Nature Reserve =

National nature reserve in Norfolk, England

Coordinates: 52.73864°N 1.49604°E

- Interactive map of Ant Broads & Marshes National Nature Reserve
- Location: Norfolk, England
- Nearest city: Neatishead
- Designated: National Nature Reserve
- Operator: English Nature

Ant Broads & Marshes NNR is a national nature reserve in Norfolk, England established by English Nature. It is named after the River Ant.

It is part of the "Ant Broads and Marshes" Site of Special Scientific Interest and is within The Broads National Park.

The NNR includes:

- Barton Broad and Catfield Fen, owned and managed by Norfolk Wildlife Trust
- Catfield Fen Reserve, owned and managed by Butterfly Conservation.

== See also ==
- National nature reserves in England
- National nature reserves in Norfolk
