= Crome's Broad =

Lake in Norfolk, England

- Location within the United Kingdom Location within Norfolk
- Location: Norfolk
- Coordinates: 52°43′21.53″N 1°30′52.83″E
- Basin countries: United Kingdom

Crome's Broad is a broad (or lake) situated to the east of the River Ant, north of How Hill, within The Broads National Park in Norfolk, England. The broad is landlocked, being the result of peat extraction in Medieval times, and covers an area of 4.3 hectares (11 acres), with a maximum depth of 0.8 metres (2 ft 7 in).

It is named after John Crome, the founder of the Norwich School of painters.
