= Hunsett Mill =

Windmill in Stalham, Norfolk, England

Hunsett Drainage Mill
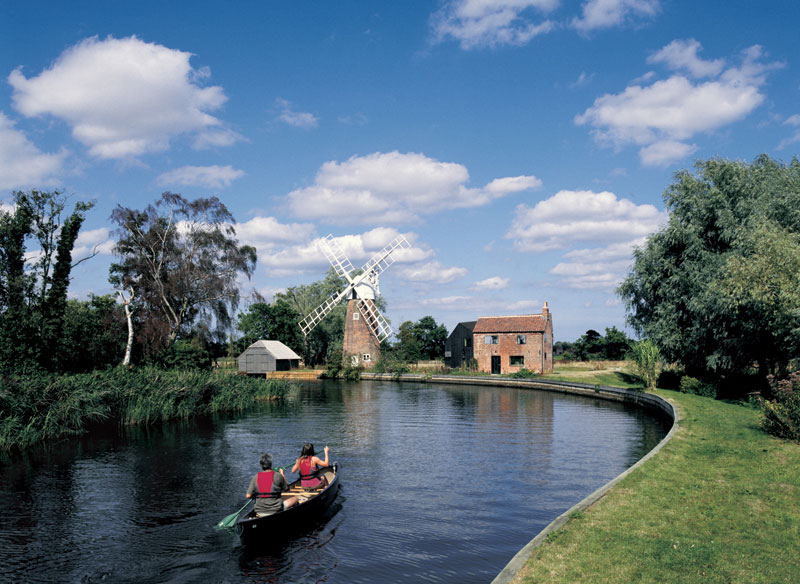
- Hunsett Drainage Mill
- Interactive map of Hunsett Drainage Mill

Origin
- Mill location: River Ant near Stalham
- Grid reference: TG364239
- Coordinates: 52°45′40.66″N 1°30′06.13″E
- Year built: 1860

Information
- Purpose: Drainage Mill

Hunsett Mill is located on the east bank of the River Ant one mile north of Barton Broad in the English county of Norfolk. The Windmill is 1.2 miles south west of the town of Stalham. The mill structure is a grade II listed building.

== Description ==
The Windmill was built in 1860 and is constructed of red bricks. The mill has a White boat shaped cap sails and a fantail. The windpump once ran two scoop wheels. The tower had four patent sails. The mill is approximately 12 m high, and has been visually retained in its original historic condition, even though internal works to the mill in the 1960s have removed all mill equipment previously installed in the brick structure. The mill is part of the large historic pumping mill system characteristic to the Broads, and is Grade II listed. (List of drainage windmills in Norfolk) The house adjacent to the mill has originally been built around the same time as the mill, but to less good standards than the mill itself. The house was built on a little raised earth mount to prevent flooding, and consisted of two spaces for the Millkeeper, a ground floor room and an upper floor room connected by a staircase. Due to its original limitations and due to repeated flooding, the Mill Keepers house has been remodelled and extended extensively, in the 1910s, 1940s, 1950s, 1970s and in 2008. Hunsett Mill is probably the most photographed windmill on the Broads appearing as it does on most postcards. This is due to its chocolate box picture setting. The Mill is quite hard to get to, being at the Northern end of the Norfolk Broads network and it has no road access. Hunsett Mill is privately owned.

== History ==
The site has probably been occupied by pumping structures for several centuries, but all existing structures on site date from 1860 or later. Embedded in the stonework of the Mill is a Datestone inscribed HUNSETT 1698 which is presumed to be originating from an earlier mill on the site. The historic mill and the mill keepers house were used for water pumping functions until approximately 1910. Since then the mill has not been used and the internals except for the cap were gutted in the 1950s/ 60s. The Hunsett Mill house has been used over the last decades as a stand-alone primary residence and holiday home. Major damage was caused to the sails of the windmill in the Great storm of 1987, which resulted in one of the sails being completely replaced with wood especially shipped all the way from Canada. On 5 May 2007 another storm caused the fan to be torn off the fanstage which was repaired in the summer of 2008.

Between 2008 and 2009, Hunsett Mill was extensively renovated and the Mill Keepers Cottage remodelled based on a design by ACME (architecture), Adams Kara Taylor (structure), Hoare Lea (Services) and built by Willow Builders Limited (www.willowbuilders.co.uk) .Five extensions made to the Cottage in the 1940s and 1950s were demolished and replaced with a single extension at the back of the cottage. In order for the new extension to retreat behind the listed setting of the mill, the new additions to the house are designed as shadows of the existing house. The structure of the new extension is made entirely from solid laminated wood, which is exposed in the interior and clad in charred cedar boards externally. Ground source heat pumps, passive solar heating, independent water well supply and a new treatment plant will make the house almost fully self-sufficient. These works to Mill and Cottage coincided with Flood defence work by the Environment Agency and included the construction of a new earth berm flood defence around the Mill and the Cottage.

== Awards ==
The Mill Keepers Cottage has won a number of awards, including the RIBA Manser Medal 2010 for the best one-off house in the United Kingdom. The house has also been shortlisted for the "Structural Awards 2009" by the Institution of Structural Engineers and the "Sustainability Awards 2009" as one of the five most sustainable projects with a budget under £2 million by the UK Green Building Council and Building Magazine. Hunsett Mill has been named as one of seven East of England winners in the RIBA Awards for architectural excellence.
