= Upton Fen =

Nature reserve in the Broads National Park in England

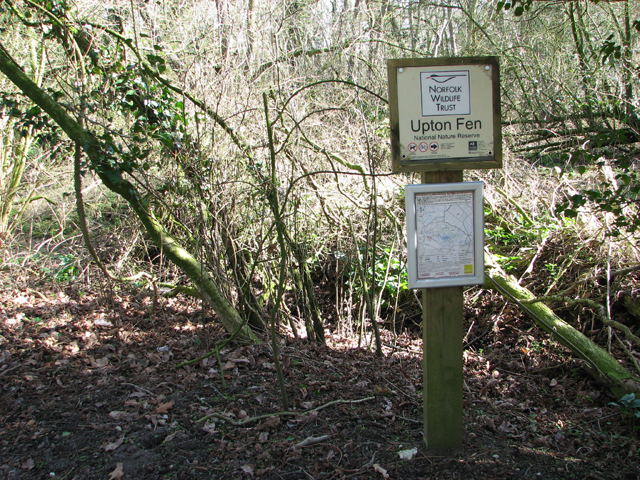
- Information boards beside the path into Upton Fen (2015)
- Interactive map of Upton Fen
- Location: The Broads National Park
- Nearest city: Norfolk, England
- Coordinates: 52.6658°N 1.5314°E
- Operator: Norfolk Wildlife Trust

Upton Fen lies within The Broads National Park in Norfolk, England.

It is a nature reserve in the care of Norfolk Wildlife Trust. Notable species found on the reserve include: Eurasian bittern, hobby, Norfolk hawker and Old World swallowtail.
