= Swansea Arena =

Indoor arena in Swansea, Wales

Swansea Building Society Arena
- Arena Abertawe
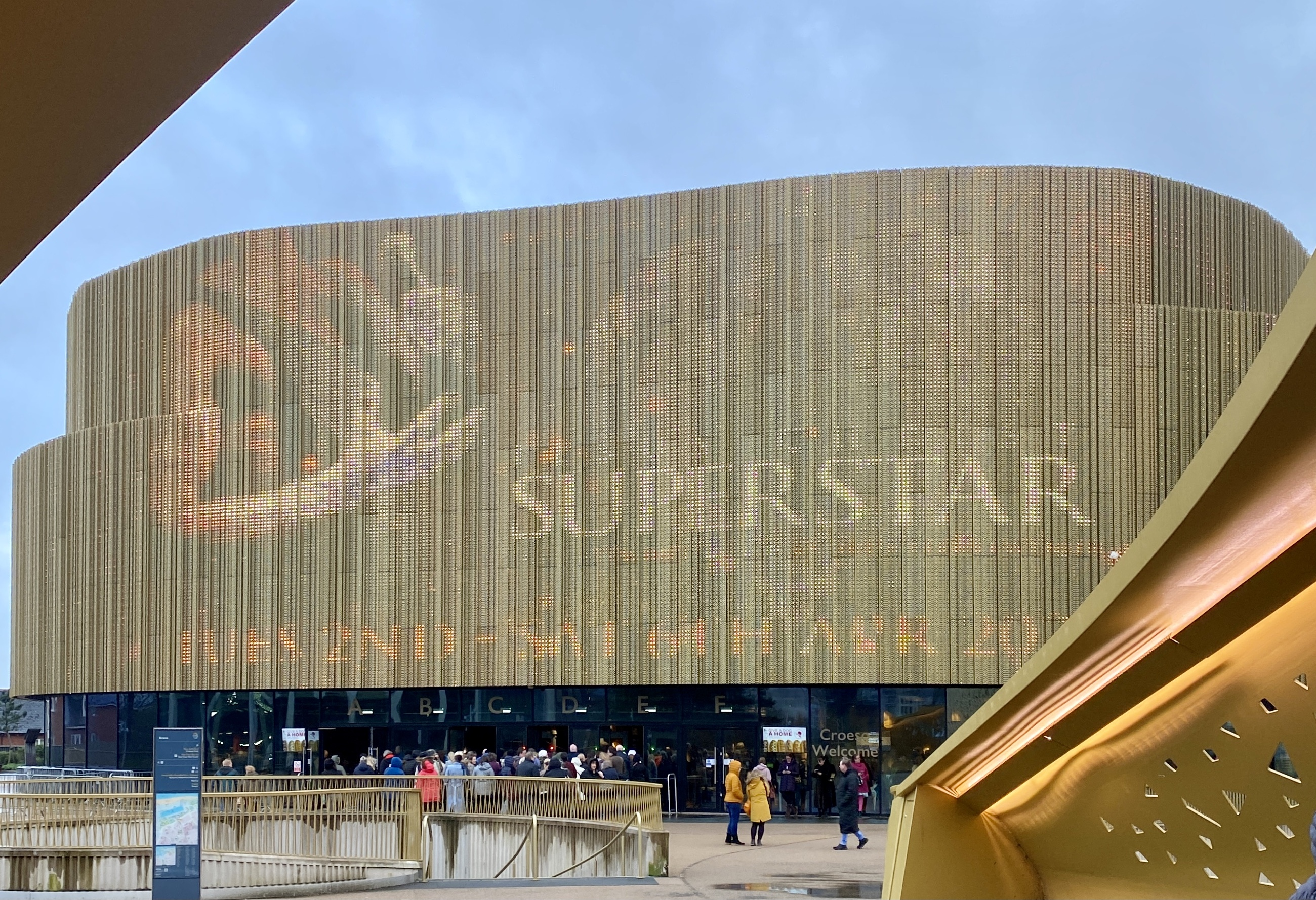
- Interactive map of Swansea Building Society Arena
- Address: Oystermouth Road, Swansea, United Kingdom
- Coordinates: 51.6160°N 3.9424°W
- Elevation: 7 metres (23 ft)
- Owner: City and County of Swansea Council
- Operator: ATG Entertainment
- Capacity: 3,500 (concerts); 2,196 (theatre); 788 (conference)

Construction
- Groundbreaking: November 2019
- Opened: 3 March 2022
- Years active: 2022–present
- Cost: £48 million
- Architect: ACME
- Project manager: Padstone
- Structural engineer: Curtins
- Main contractor: Buckingham Group Contracting Ltd

Website
- www.swansea-arena.co.uk

Swansea Arena (Welsh: Arena Abertawe), called Swansea Building Society Arena for sponsorship purposes, is a multi-purpose indoor arena that can hold up to 3,500 people located in Swansea, Wales. Part of a £135 million regeneration project, construction began in 2019 and the venue opened in March 2022. The arena has a gold-coloured facade and features a wraparound display made of 93,000 LEDs, making it the largest digital facade in the United Kingdom.

Phase one of the wider Copr Bay project also included a new gold-painted footbridge over Oystermouth Road which links the arena site to a new apartment complex and the city centre, an adjacent coastal-themed public park with a pavilion-style cafe restaurant and multi-storey car park underneath it, retail units on Cupid Way and a proposed hotel with a rooftop bar sited between the arena and the Swansea LC.

== History ==
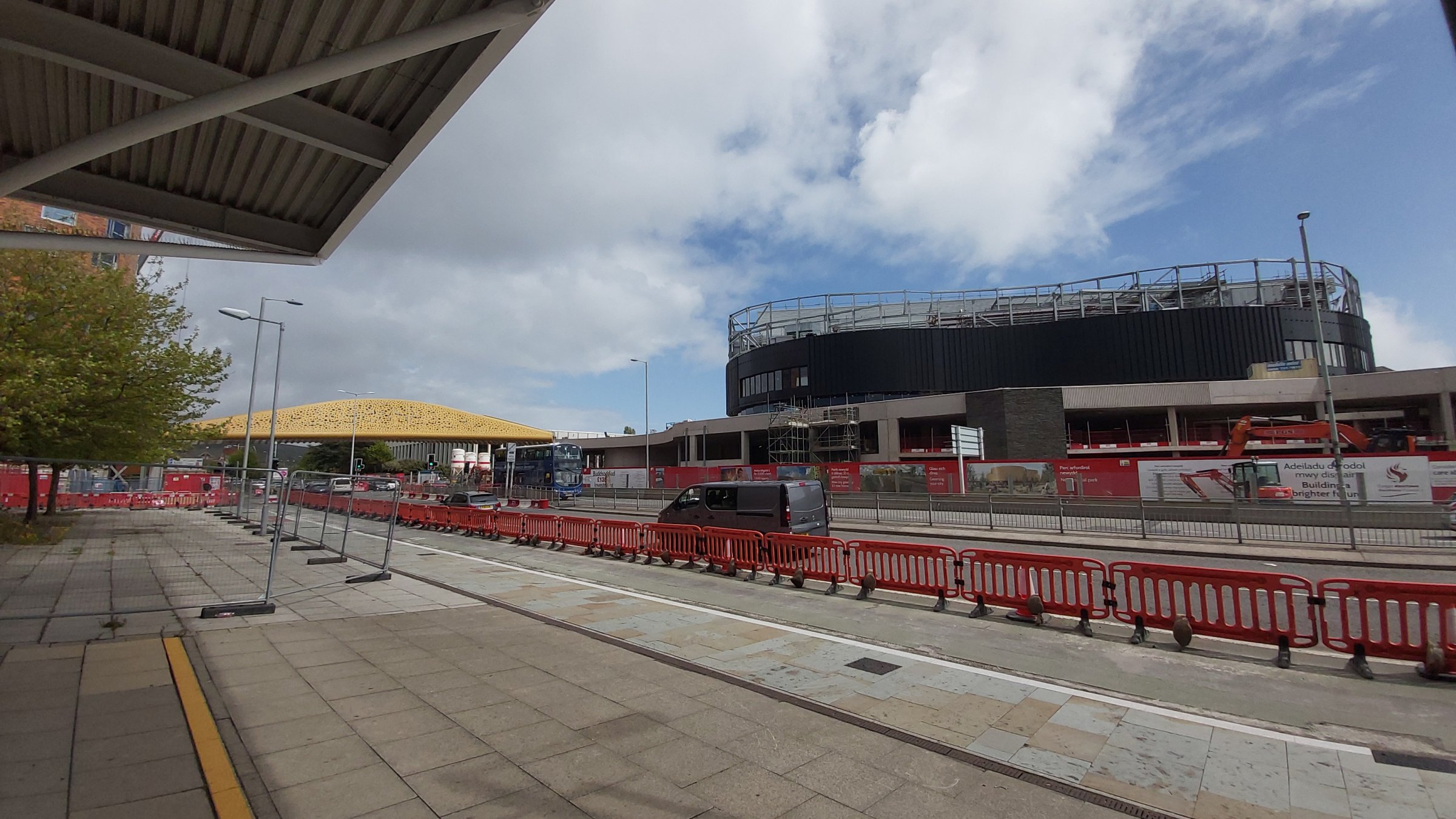
Construction of the new Swansea Arena and Copr Bay footbridge (May 2021)

In 2015, Swansea Council announced a £135 million project to transform the Swansea Bay area. The project, named Copr Bay, included the construction of an arena designed by architecture firm ACME. Construction began in 2019 with Buckingham Group as the principal contractor. After an eighteen-month search for an operator, Ambassador Theatre Group signed a lease with the city's council to rent the venue for thirty years. The construction took longer than expected due to security concerns following the Manchester Arena bombing in 2017.

The arena opened to the public on 3 March 2022 after the inaugural event, a Royal Blood concert, was delayed due to the COVID-19 pandemic. The official opening was attended by the First Minister of Wales, Mark Drakeford. In its first year the venue hosted 240,000 people.

On 28 January 2025, Swansea Building Society announced a five-year naming rights deal with the arena, renaming the venue to Swansea Building Society Arena.

== Design and architecture ==
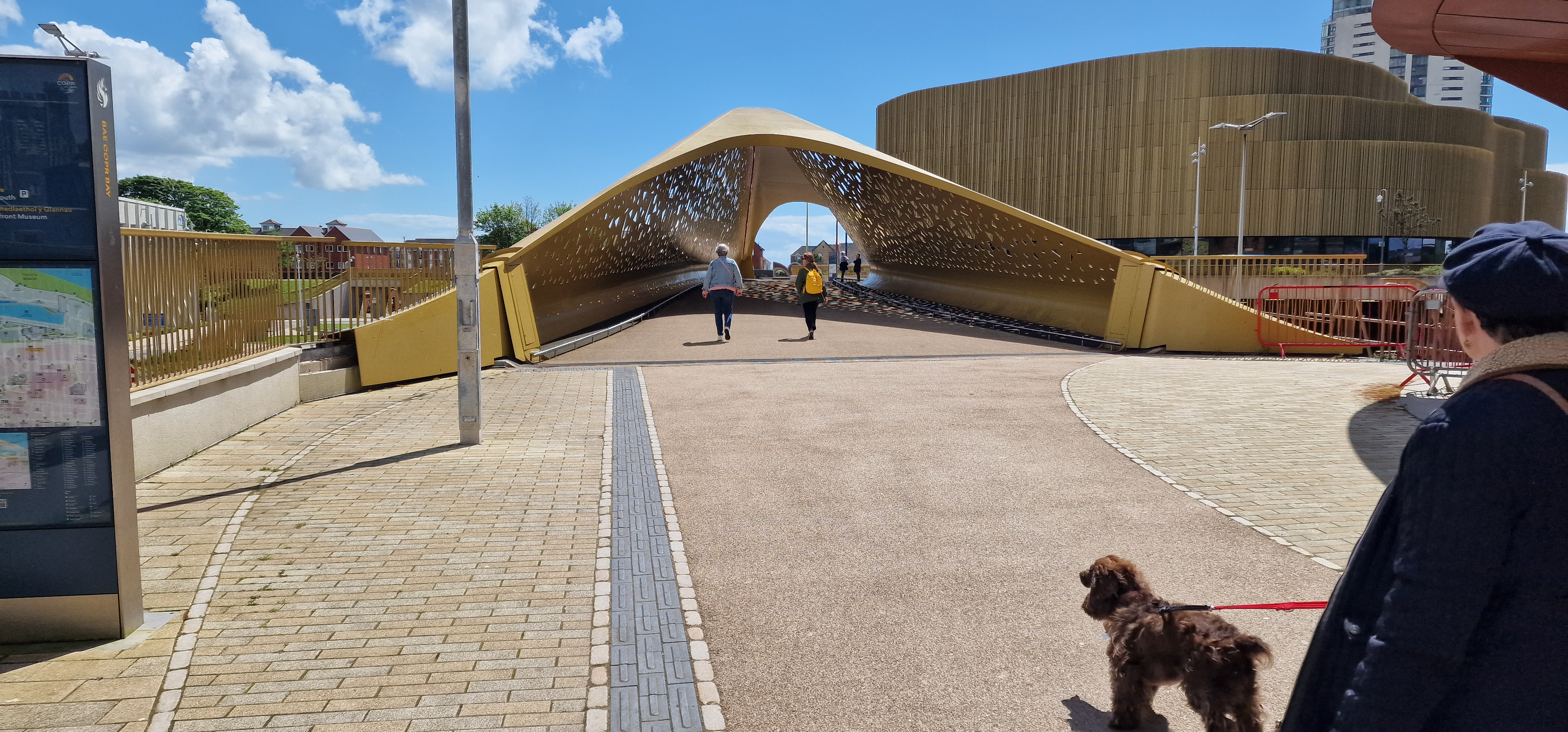
The arena and Copr Bay Bridge (2024)

The arena's exterior is constructed of gold-coloured aluminum panels. The facade has a built-in wraparound display made of 93,000 LED lights, which designers say is the largest in the United Kingdom.

The arena's hospitality area was designed to "maximise revenue" and can be quickly transformed for hosting different events. The arena's main auditorium holds 3,500 through a combination of seating and standing configurations and the conference theater has 750 seats. There are also meeting rooms to hire.

== See also ==
- List of cultural venues in Swansea
