= Ant Broads and Marshes =

UK Site of Special Scientific Interest

Coordinates: 52.739°N 1.502°E

- Site of Special Scientific Interest
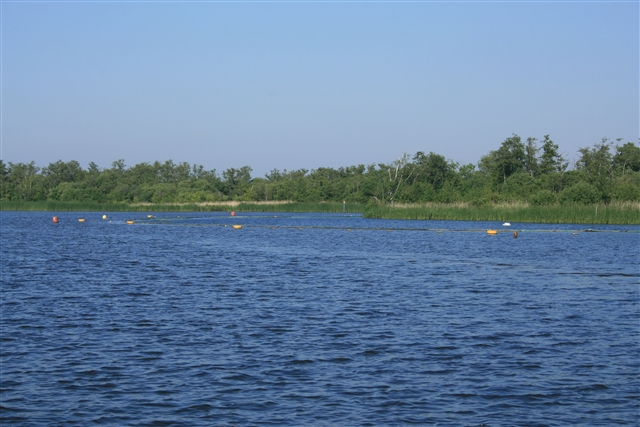
- Barton Broad
- Location of Ant Broads and Marshes.
- Area of search: Norfolk, England
- Grid reference: TG 365 215
- Interest: Biological
- Area: 745.3 hectares (1,842 acres)
- Notification date: 1989
- Location map: Magic Map

Ant Broads and Marshes is a 745.3-hectare (1,842-acre) biological Site of Special Scientific Interest north-east of Norwich in Norfolk, England. Most of it is a Nature Conservation Review site, Grade 1, and it is part of the Broadland Ramsar and Special Protection Area, and The Broads Special Area of Conservation. Parts of it is the Barton Broad nature reserve, which is managed by the Norfolk Wildlife Trust, and Catfield Fen Reserve. Two areas are National Nature Reserves.

This site in the valley of the River Ant is described by Natural England as the "finest example of unpolluted valley fen in Western Europe". It has a network of dykes that support a diverse variety of aquatic plants, and its fenland invertebrate fauna is of national importance.
