= The Broads =

Network of rivers and lakes in East Anglia

- Norfolk Broads; Suffolk Broads
- IUCN category V (protected landscape/seascape)
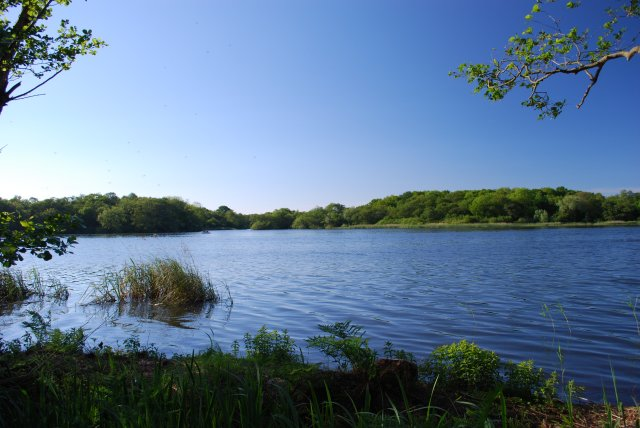
- Ormesby Little Broad, part of the Norfolk Broads near Great Yarmouth
- Interactive map of The Broads
- Location: Norfolk and Suffolk, East of England, United Kingdom
- Coordinates: 52°36′2.34″N 1°36′37.1448″E
- Area: 303 km^{2} (117 sq mi)
- Established: 1989
- Governing body: Broads Authority
- Website: www.broads-authority.gov.uk

Ramsar Wetland
- Official name: Broadland
- Designated: 5 January 1976
- Reference no.: 68

The Broads (known for marketing purposes as The Broads National Park) is a network of mostly navigable rivers and lakes in the English counties of Norfolk and Suffolk. Although the terms "Norfolk Broads" and "Suffolk Broads" are correctly used to identify specific areas within the two counties respectively, often the whole area is referred to as the Norfolk Broads.

The lakes, known as broads, were formed by the flooding of peat workings. The Broads, and some surrounding land, were constituted as a special area with a level of protection similar to a national park by the Norfolk and Suffolk Broads Act 1988. The Broads Authority, a special statutory authority responsible for managing the area, became operational in 1989.

The area is 303 square kilometres (117 sq mi), most of which is in Norfolk, with over 200 kilometres (120 mi) of navigable waterways. There are seven rivers and 63 broads, mostly less than 4 metres (13 ft) deep. Thirteen broads are generally open to navigation, with a further three having navigable channels. Some broads have navigation restrictions imposed on them in autumn and winter, although the legality of the restrictions is questionable.

The Broads has similar status to the national parks in England and Wales; the Broads Authority has powers and duties akin to the National Parks but is also the third-largest inland navigation authority. Because of its navigation role the Broads Authority was established under its own legislation, Norfolk and Suffolk Broads Act 1988 which came into effect on 1 April 1989. The Broads Authority Act 2009, which was promoted through Parliament by the authority, is intended to improve public safety on the water.

== "Broads National Park" name ==
In January 2015 the Broads Authority approved a change in name of the area to the "Broads National Park", to recognise that the status of the area is equivalent to the English National Parks, that the Broads Authority shares the same two first purposes (relating to conservation and promoting enjoyment) as the English National Park Authorities, and receives a National Park grant.

This followed a three-month consultation which resulted in support from 79% of consultees, including unanimous support from the 14 UK national parks and the Campaign for National Parks. Defra, the Government department responsible for the parks, also expressed it was content that the Authority would make its own decision on the matter.

This is the subject of ongoing controversy among some Broads users who note that the Broads is not named in law as a National Park and claim the branding detracts from the Broads Authority's third purpose which is to protect the interests of navigation. In response to this, the Broads Authority has stated that its three purposes will remain in equal balance and that the branding is simply for marketing the National Park qualities of the Broads.

== Management ==
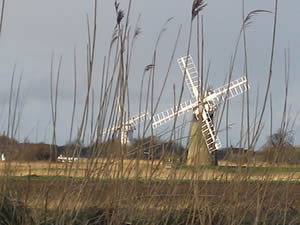
Drainage windmills on the Norfolk Broads

The Broads Authority is the agency which has statutory responsibility for the Broads. The Nature Conservancy Council (now Natural England), pressed for a special authority to manage the Broads which had been neglected for a long time, and in 1978 the forerunner to the present-day Broads Authority was established by the Countryside Commission (now also Natural England). Ten years later it had become clear that a statutory body was needed, and a special Act of Parliament, the Norfolk and Suffolk Broads Act 1988 (referred to as the Broads Act) made the Broads Authority into a special statutory authority which gave it parity with national park authorities but with special responsibilities for navigation. The Broads Authority Act 2009 introduced greater safety controls on the broads and rivers.

The Broads Authority has to:

- conserve and enhance the natural beauty, wildlife and cultural heritage of the Broads
- promote opportunities for the understanding and enjoyment of the special qualities of the Broads by the public
- protect the interests of navigation (as navigation authority)
- have regard for agriculture and forestry
- have regard for the economic and social interests of those who live or work in the Broads.

The authority has 21 members, who are appointed. Ten members are chosen by the Secretary of State for Environment, Food, and Rural Affairs, two are selected by the authority from its navigation committee, and nine are chosen by the local authorities within which the Broads lie from their own membership. Norfolk County Council appoints two members, and one member is appointed by Suffolk County Council and the district councils of Broadland, Great Yarmouth, North Norfolk, the City of Norwich, South Norfolk, and Waveney. The Broads Authority was formerly represented by one member on the East of England Regional Assembly, now defunct.

== History ==
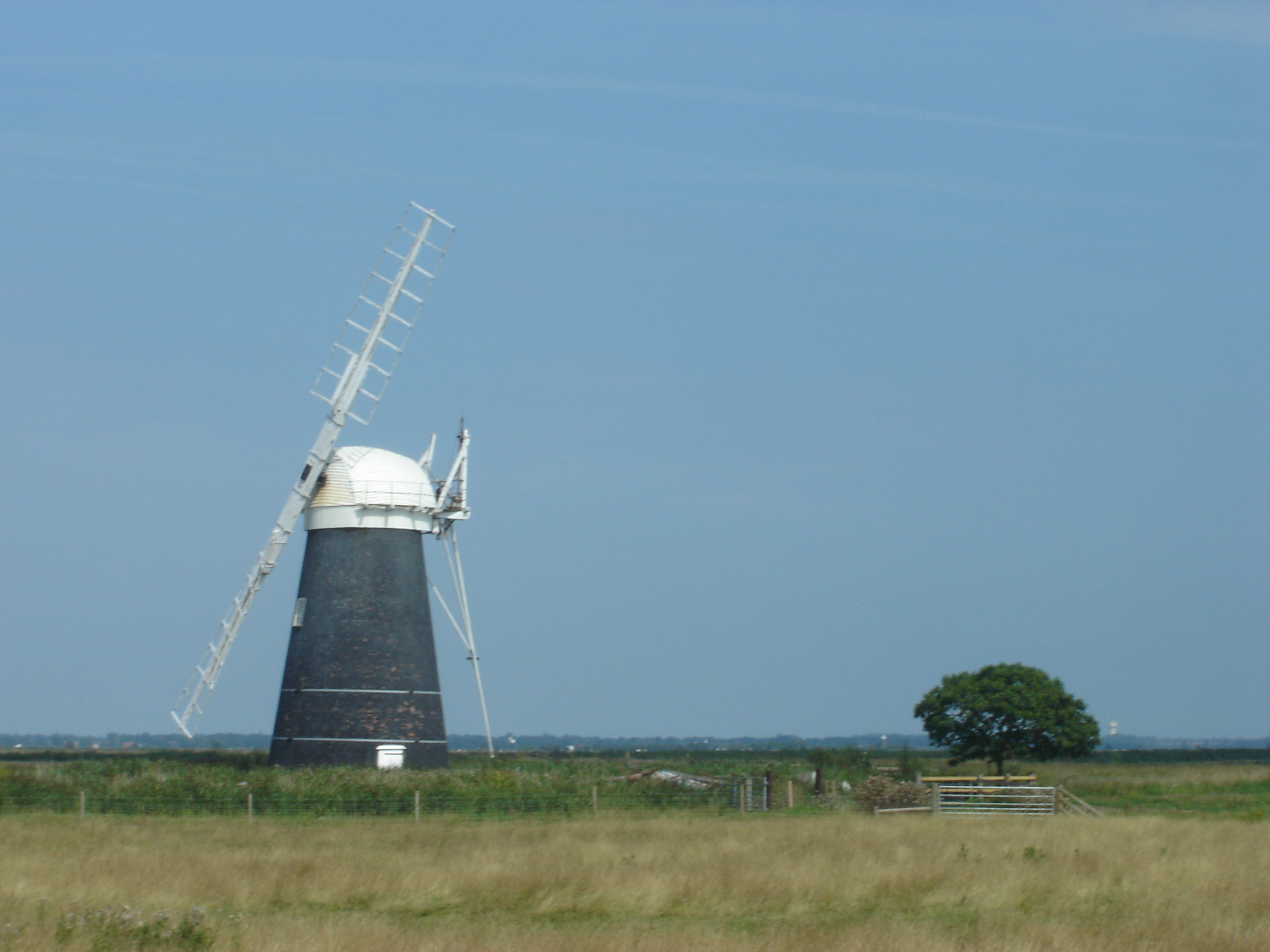
Mutton's Mill, one of the many historic drainage windpumps on the Norfolk Broads

For many years the lakes known as broads were regarded as natural features of the landscape. It was only in the 1960s that Joyce Lambert proved that they were artificial features—flooded medieval peat excavations. In the Middle Ages the local monasteries began to excavate the peatlands as a turbary business, selling fuel to Norwich and Great Yarmouth. Norwich Cathedral took 320,000 tonnes of peat a year. Then the sea levels began to rise, and the pits began to flood. Despite the construction of windpumps and dykes, the flooding continued and resulted in the typical Broads landscape of today, with its reedbeds, grazing marshes and wet woodland.

Various attempts were made to extend the navigable rivers. The longest-lasting was on the River Waveney, where the Rivers Brandon and Waveney Navigation Act 1670 authorised improvements which included three locks, at Geldeston, Ellingham and Wainford. The head of navigation became a new staithe at Bungay. The new section was a private navigation which was not controlled by the Yarmouth Haven and Pier Commissioners, who had responsibility for the rest of the Broadland rivers. It remained in use until 1934 and, although the upper two locks have been replaced by sluices and Geldeston lock is derelict, the Environment Agency have negotiated with local landowners to allow use by canoes and unpowered vessels which can be portaged around the locks.

The next attempt was to extend navigation on the River Bure from Coltishall to Aylsham, which was authorised by an act of Parliament on 7 April 1773. Five locks were built, to bypass mills, at Coltishall, Oxnead Lamas, Oxnead, Burgh and Aylsham. There were financial difficulties during construction, but the works were eventually completed and opened in October 1779. At Aylsham, a 1-mile (1.6 km) cut was made from the river to a terminal basin, where several warehouses were constructed. Despite the arrival of the railways in 1879, goods continued to be carried to Aylsham by wherries until 1912, when major flooding badly damaged the locks. Unable to fund repairs, the Commissioners closed the 9-mile (14 km) section above Coltishall, although it was not formally abandoned until 1928. All of the locks are derelict, but the course can still be used by canoes and light craft, which can be portaged around the locks.

The third attempt was to make the River Ant navigable from Dilham to Antingham. The North Walsham and Dilham Canal Navigation Act 1812 authorised the North Walsham and Dilham Canal, but work on its construction did not start until April 1825. The canal was a true canal, as its route did not use the bed of the river, and its construction, including six locks, was completed in 1826. It was about 8 3/4 miles (14.1 km) long, and the locks raised the level by 58 feet (18 m). In 1886 the canal was sold to miller, Edward Press, for £600, but the principal clerk absconded with most of the money and it was never recovered. In 1893 the section from Swafield locks to Antingham was abandoned, and the lower section was damaged by flooding in 1912. Some attempts were made to improve it in the 1920s, but the last commercial traffic used it in 1934, and it gradually became derelict after that. There is still a public right of navigation to Swafield, and there is a campaign to reopen it.

In 1814 the merchants of Norwich first suggested a plan to improve the route between Norwich and the North Sea, as the shallowness of Breydon Water created difficulties for trading vessels, and there was organised theft of cargo during its transhipment at Great Yarmouth, for which 18 men were convicted of taking the goods and one of receiving it in 1820. The initial plan was to dredge a deeper channel along the southern edge of Breydon Water, but the scheme was opposed by the people of Yarmouth. A more expensive scheme, involving the construction of a new cut to link the River Yare to the River Waveney, together with a channel between Oulton Broad and Lake Lothing, where a sea lock was needed, was also opposed by Yarmouth but formed the basis of a bill presented to Parliament. An act of Parliament, the Norwich and Lowestoft Navigation Act 1827 (7 & 8 Geo. 4. c. xlii), was passed on 28 May 1827, creating the Norwich and Lowestoft Navigation Company, and the work of construction and dredging of the River Yare and the Oulton Dyke was completed in 1833. The initial capital of £100,000 was inadequate and a further £50,000 was borrowed from the Exchequer Bill Loan Commission. The venture was not a commercial success and, with expenditure exceeding income, the company was unable to repay its loan. The Haddiscoe Cut was taken over by the Commissioners in 1842 and sold to the railway developer Sir Samuel Morton Peto.

=== Recreation ===
The Broads have been a boating holiday destination since the late 19th century. In 1878 small yachts were available to hire from John Loynes and, with easy access to the area by rail from London, Harry Blake created an agency for yachting holidays in 1908. The first boats were owned by the boatbuilder Ernest Collins of Wroxham, but other boatyards were soon added to the business. The range of boats expanded to include powered cruisers in the 1930s, and the Hoseasons agency was founded soon after the Second World War. By the 1980s the number of cruisers available for hire was 2,400 but had decreased to around 1,700 by 2004. For conservation reasons there is a strict speed limit enforced on all vessels, to reduce waves eroding the riverbanks. These speed limits are hardwired onto most rental vessels.

The Broads have also been an important centre for racing yachts since the late 19th century, and the design of the boats have included several innovative features, including shortfin keels and a separate rudder. The design was eventually used on seagoing yachts from the 1960s.

The waterways are lock-free. There are five bridges under which only small cruisers and smaller boats can pass.

The area attracts all kinds of visitors, including ramblers, artists, anglers, and birdwatchers as well as people "messing about in boats". There are a number of companies hiring boats for leisure use, including both yachts and motor launches. The Norfolk wherry, the traditional cargo craft of the area, can still be seen on the Broads as some specimens have been preserved and restored.

Ted Ellis, a local naturalist, referred to the Broads as "the breathing space for the cure of souls".

A great variety of boats can be found on the Broads, from Edwardian trading wherries to state-of-the-art electric or solar-powered boats. The Broads Authority is promoting sustainable boating, and the use of electric boats is being encouraged by the provision of charging points at a number of the mooring sites provided by the Authority.

== Geography ==
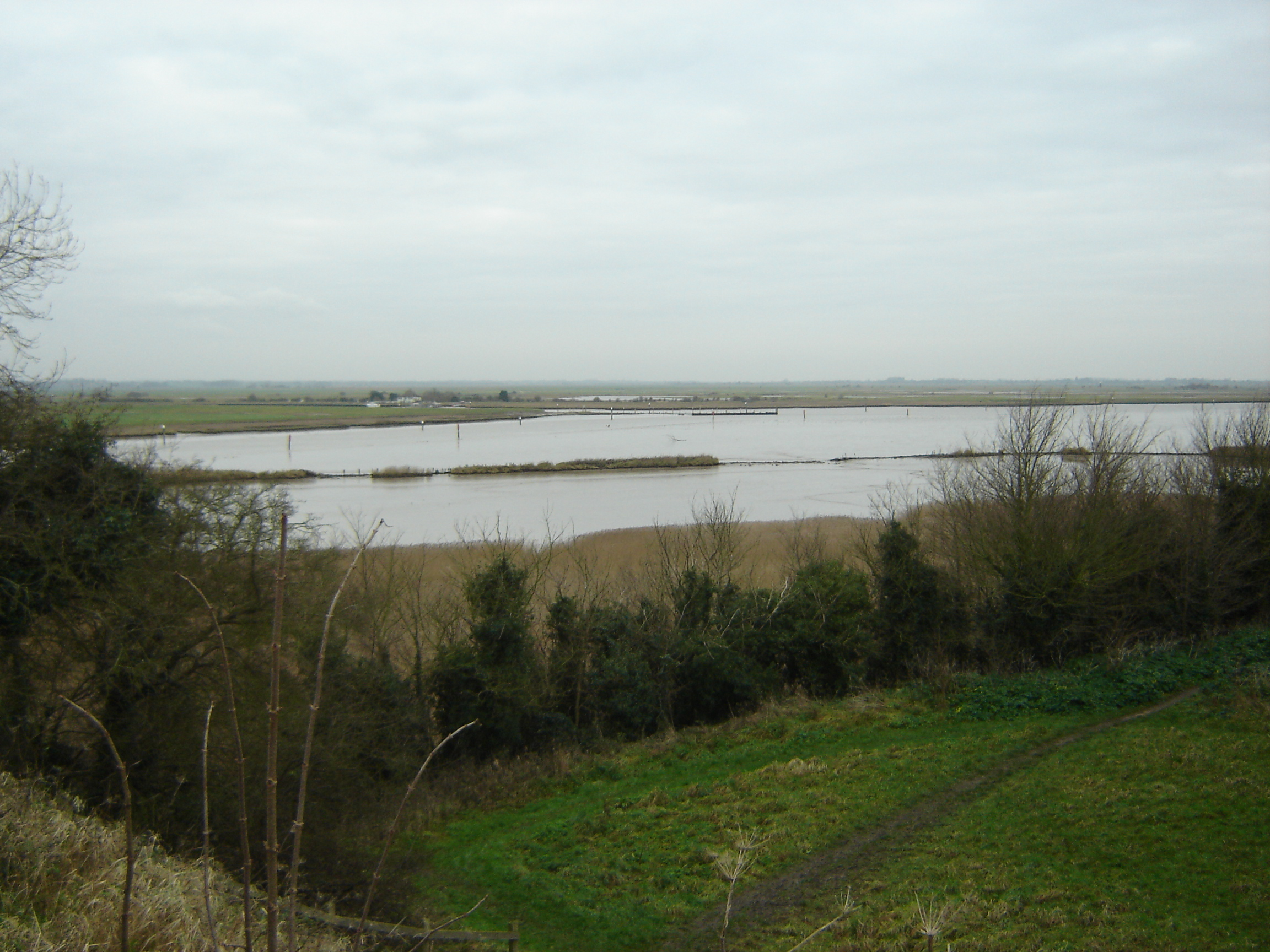
The point at which the River Yare and the River Waveney merge into Breydon Water

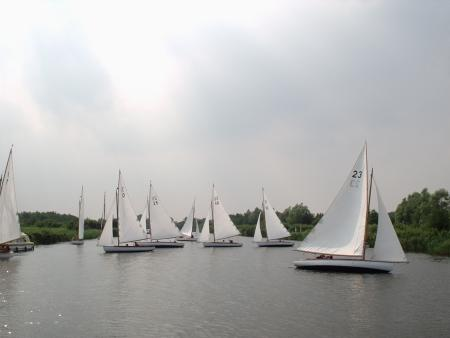
Yachts on the Norfolk Broads

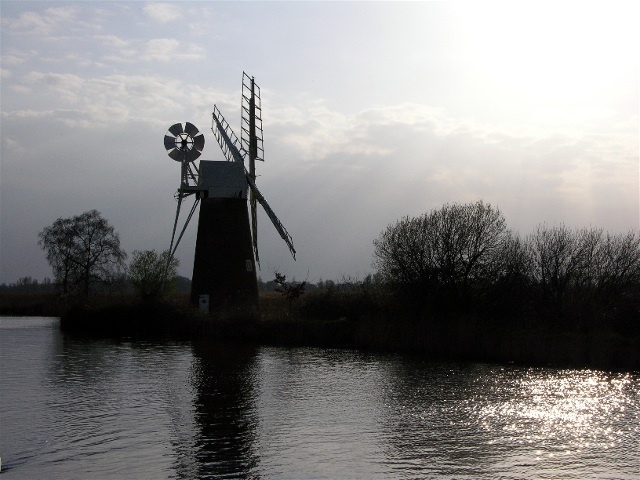
How Hill

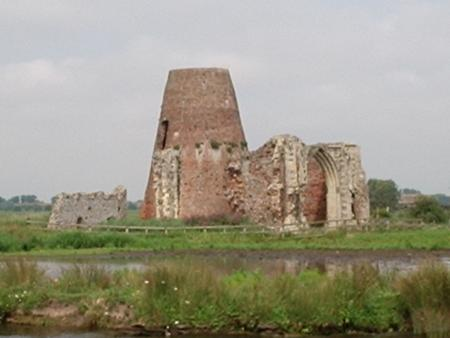
The ruined gatehouse of St. Benet's Abbey

See also Geology of the Broads

The Broads largely follows the line of the rivers and natural navigations of the area. There are seven navigable rivers: the River Yare and its (direct and indirect) tributaries plus the Rivers Bure, Thurne, Ant, Waveney, Chet and Wensum. There are no longer any operational locks on any of the rivers (except for Mutford Lock in Oulton Broad that links to the saltwater Lake Lothing in Lowestoft, Suffolk), and all of the waterways are subject to tidal influence. The tidal range decreases with distance from the sea, with highly tidal areas such as Breydon Water contrasting with effectively non-tidal reaches such as the River Ant upstream of Barton Broad.

The broads themselves range in size from small pools to the large expanses of Hickling Broad, Barton Broad and Breydon Water. The broads are unevenly distributed, with far more broads in the northern half of Broadland (the Rivers Bure, Thurne and Ant) than in the central and southern portions (the Rivers Yare, Waveney, Chet and Wensum). Individual broads may lie directly on the river, or are more often situated to one side and connected to the river by an artificial channel or dyke.

Besides the natural watercourses of the rivers, and the ancient but artificial broads, there is one more recent navigation canal, the lockless Haddiscoe Cut, which connects the Rivers Yare and Waveney while permitting boats to bypass Breydon Water.

There is also a second navigable link to the sea, via the River Waveney and its link to Oulton Broad. Oulton Broad is part of the Broads' tidal system, but is immediately adjacent to Lake Lothing, which acts as a harbour for Lowestoft and connects to the North Sea. Oulton Broad and Lake Lothing are connected by Mutford Lock, the only lock on the broads, and which is necessary because of the different tidal ranges and cycles in the two lakes.

In the lists below, names of broads are in bold to help distinguish them from towns and villages.

=== River Bure ===
The River Bure is a tributary of the River Yare which rises near Aylsham in Norfolk and joins the Yare just downstream of Breydon Water. On its way it flows through or passes:

- Brampton, Norfolk
- Buxton with Lamas
- Coltishall
- Belaugh
- **Belaugh Broad**
- **Bridge Broad**
- Wroxham
- Hoveton
- **Wroxham Broad**
- **Hoveton Great Broad**
- **Salhouse Broad**
- Bure Marshes NNR (national nature reserve)
- Salhouse
- Woodbastwick
- **Decoy Broad**
- **Hoveton Little Broad** (sometimes called 'Blackhorse Broad')
- **Burnt Fen Broad**
- Horning
- **Cockshoot Broad**
- **Ranworth Broad**
- **Malthouse Broad**
- Ranworth
- South Walsham
- St. Benet's Abbey
- Upton
- **Upton Broad**
- Upton Broads and Marshes Site of Special Scientific Interest
- Upton Fen
- Acle
- Oby
- Stokesby
- **Mautby Decoy**
- Great Yarmouth

=== River Thurne ===
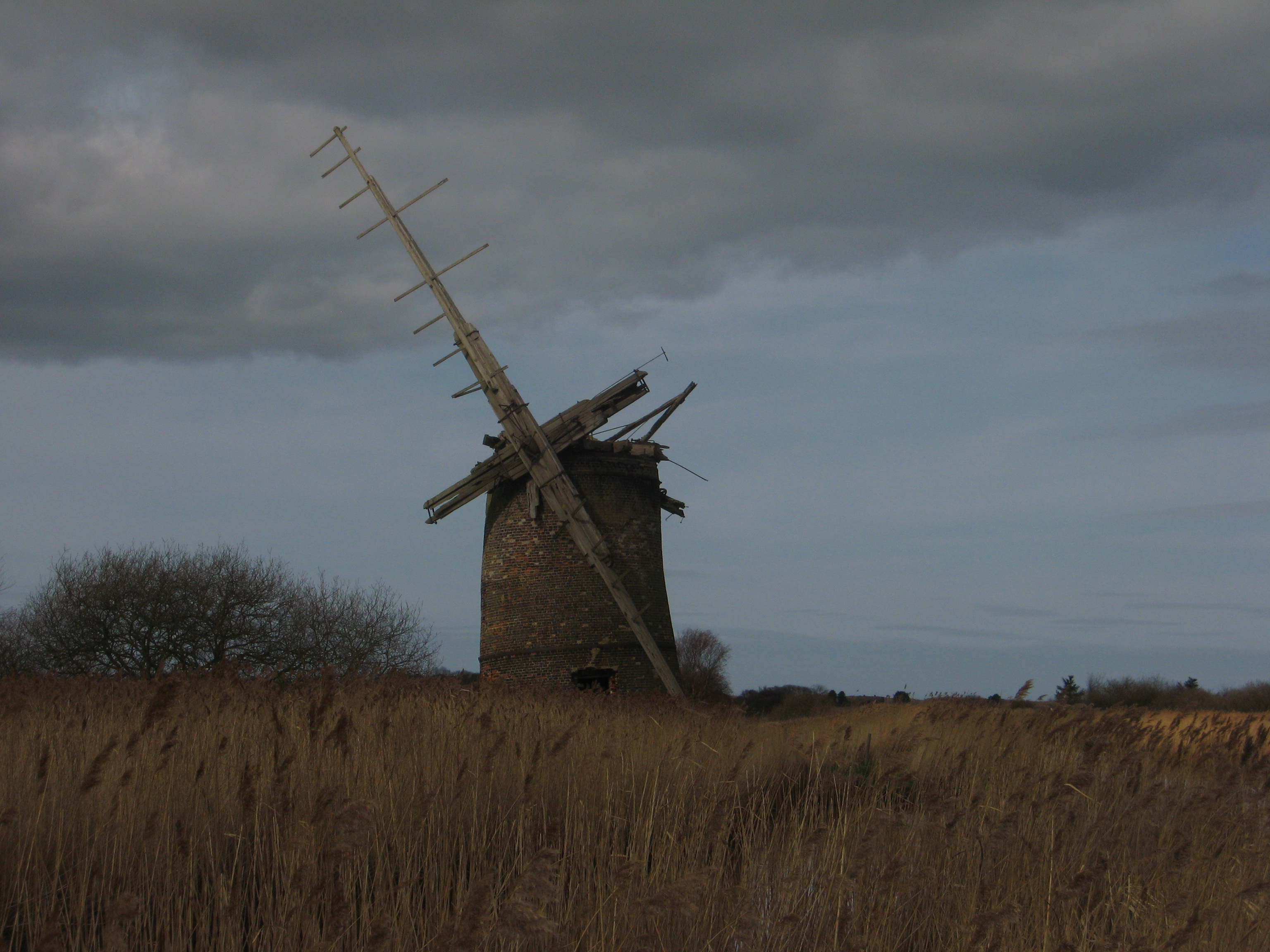
The derelict Brograve Mill, on the Waxham New Cut near Horsey

The River Thurne is a tributary of the River Bure. It rises near Martham Broad and flows for about six miles (9.7 km) to Thurne Mouth where it joins the Bure. It is wide open and windswept, and on its way it flows through or passes:

- Upper Thurne Broads and Marshes Site of Special Scientific Interest
- **Hickling Broad**
- Hickling
- Horsey
- **Horsey Mere**
- **Martham Broad** (NNR) (national nature reserve)
- Martham
- West Somerton
- Thurne
- Potter Heigham
- Ludham
- Ludham - Potter Heigham NNR (national nature reserve)
- **Womack Water**

=== River Ant ===
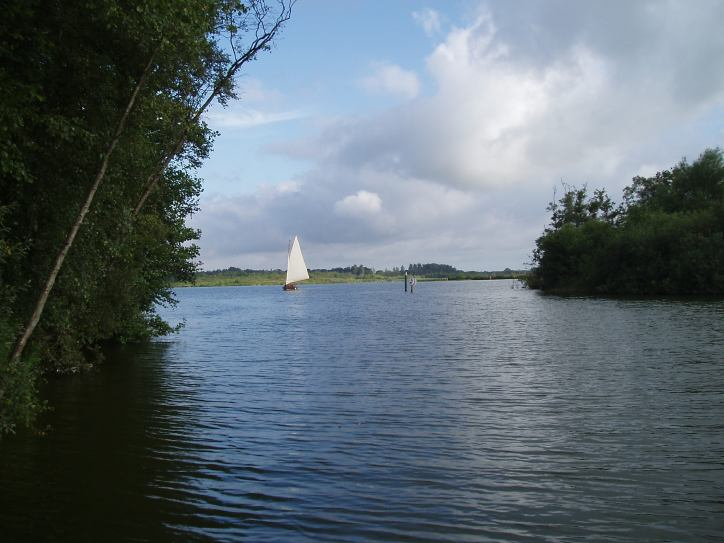
Barton Broad

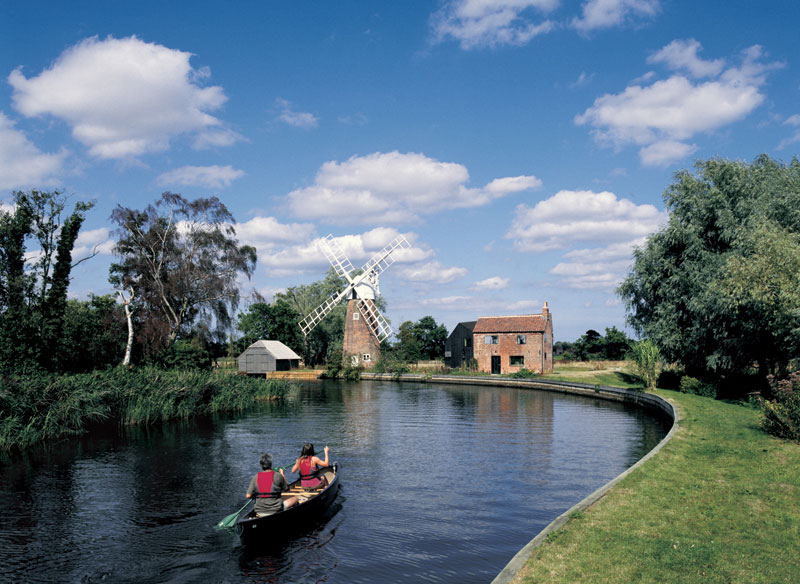
River Ant at Hunsett Windmill, Stalham

The River Ant is a tributary of the River Bure. It rises at Antingham and joins the Bure at St. Benet's Abbey. It is winding and narrow, and on its way it flows through or passes:

- Honing
- **North Walsham and Dilham Canal**
- Dilham
- **Dilham Broad**
- Wayford Bridge
- **Barton Broad**
- Stalham
- Sutton
- **Sutton Broad**
- Ant Broads & Marshes NNR (national nature reserve)
- **Turkey Broad**
- **Alderfen Broad**
- **Catfield Broad**
- **Crome's Broad**
- Neatishead
- Barton Turf
- Irstead
- How Hill
- Ludham Bridge
- **Broad Fen**
- **Calthorpe Broad** (NNR) (national nature reserve)
- Ingham, Norfolk

=== River Yare ===
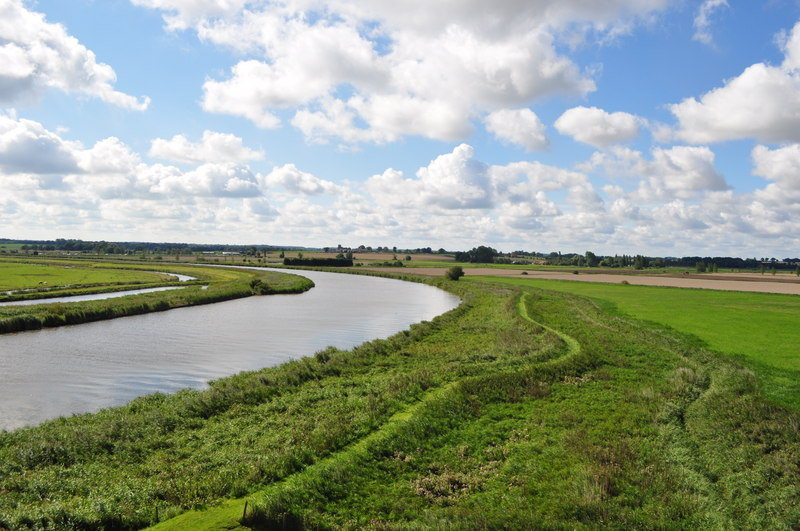
View of the Yare from Hardley windpump near Langley

The River Yare rises south of Dereham and flows through the southern fringes of the city of Norwich, passes through Breydon Water and flows into the sea between Great Yarmouth and Gorleston. On its way it passes through:

- **Breydon Water**, RSPB reserve
- Halvergate Marshes, RSPB reserve
- Halvergate
- Berney Arms
- RSPB Berney Marshes
- Reedham
- Cantley
- **Carleton Broad**
- **Rockland Broad**
- **UEA Broad**
- **Wheatfen Broad**
- **Strumpshaw Fen**, RSPB reserve
- Mid-Yare NNR (national nature reserve)
- Surlingham
- **Surlingham Broad**
- **Surlingham Church Marsh** RSPB reserve.
- **Brundall Broad**
- Haddiscoe
- **Haddiscoe Cut** also known as New Cut
- Brundall
- Langley
- Postwick
- Thorpe St. Andrew

=== River Chet ===
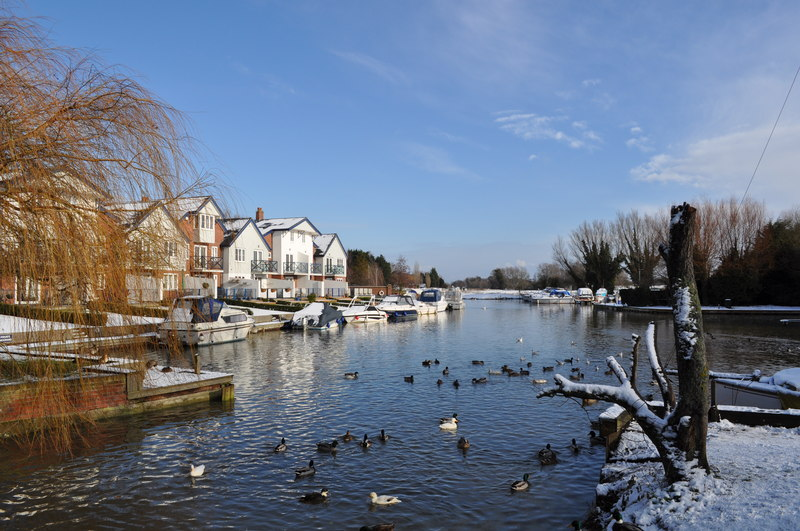
The free moorings at Loddon

The River Chet is a tributary of the River Yare. It flows through, or passes by:

- Loddon
- Chedgrave
- **Hardley Flood**

=== River Waveney ===
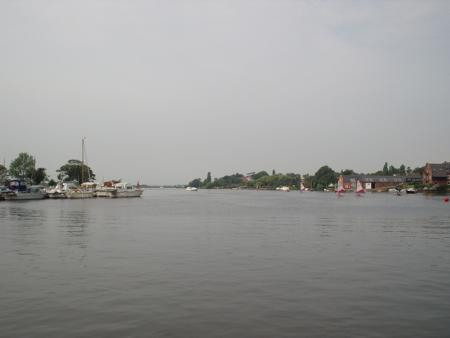
Oulton Broad

The River Waveney is a tributary of the River Yare, joining that river just upstream of Breydon Water. It flows through, or passes by:

- Burgh Castle
- Beccles
- Worlingham
- Diss, Norfolk
- St. Olaves
- Herringfleet
- Somerleyton
- Fritton
- **Fritton Lake**
- Gillingham
- Geldeston
- Burgh St. Peter
- Bungay
- Ditchingham
- **Barnby Broad and Marshes**
- **Oulton Broad**
- Lowestoft

=== River Wensum ===
The River Wensum rises near Fakenham in northwest Norfolk and flows southeast and through the centre of the city of Norwich before joining the River Yare just to the east of the city. Although the Wensum is the larger of the two rivers at their confluence, it is regarded as a tributary of the River Yare. The navigable section of the river is entirely urban and runs from the centre of Norwich, past Norwich Cathedral to the confluence with the Yare.

=== Trinity Broads ===
The Trinity Broads are an exception to the general rule, in that whilst they are connected to each other they have no navigable connection to the rest of the broads. The broads are:

- **Rollesby Broad**
- **Ormesby Broad**
- **Filby Broad**
- **Lily Broad**
- **Ormesby Little Broad**

== Eutrophication from farming and sewage ==
Eutrophication is an enormous problem in the Broads. Changes in farming practices and sewage disposal in the 1950s and 1960s released high levels of phosphorus and nitrogen into the Broads, causing eutrophication. Algal blooms can be toxic, posing a health risk to humans and wildlife. Mass decay of plant matter removes oxygen, damaging fish stocks, preventing recreational fishing. The loss of larger plants and reed fringes in eutrophic waters increases erosion of banks and the buildup of sediment on lake floors. This impedes navigation and requires costly dredging to remove. The beauty of the area is damaged by eutrophication, which is detrimental to the tourism industry. The Broads Authority and Environment Agency have been working to return the broads to a more natural state since the problem was identified in 1965.

The first stage in reversing eutrophication in the Broads is to reduce phosphate input. Reducing nitrate input would have a similar effect, but due to the relatively higher solubility of nitrates, it is harder to control. The discharge of treated sewage was recognised as the main source of phosphates in the waters of the broads. Iron compounds have been used to precipitate phosphates out of treated sewage in all nine treatment plants upstream of Barton Broad, initially cutting phosphorus levels in sewage discharge by 90%. High levels of phosphate can remain present in the sediments at the bottom of waterways, preventing dissolved levels decreasing, even when the source is eliminated. Suction dredging has been used across the Broads to both deepen waterways and remove phosphate-rich sludge. Without stabilising the compacted peat beneath the sludge, the peat loosens and can release phosphorus at a similar rate. The growth of larger water plants, which stabilise the floor, is, therefore, necessary to complete the transformation.

Even with reduced nutrient levels, algae tend to remain dominant, blocking light and preventing plants from growing on the floor of the waterway. By manipulating the food chain, a process called biomanipulation, algae can be removed. To allow zooplankton to thrive, planktivorous fish have been largely removed from some Broads, normally by electrofishing. Around 75% of such fish must be removed for successful treatment. The explosion of zooplankton that results eats almost all algae, creating clear waters. Plants are allowed to naturally recolonise the clearer waterways. The plant growth stabilises the floor, reducing the release of phosphorus. Their own nutrient uptake reduces nutrients available to algae. Larger plants also create a favourable environment for predatory fish such as pike, which eat planktivorous fish, continuing to control their numbers. These effects tend to create a stable ecosystem where low growing underwater plants dominate.

== Ecology and conservation ==
The Broads are Britain's largest protected wetland and are home to a wealth of birdlife. Amongst the species seen are mallard, coot, moorhen, great crested grebe, greylag goose, Canada goose, Egyptian goose, grey heron, marsh harrier, cormorant, kestrel, sparrowhawk and bittern. The scarce Cetti's warbler breeds in the broads and breeding common cranes are found in the area.

Among the rare insects are the Norfolk hawker, a species of dragonfly, and the Swallowtail butterfly (Papilio machaon subsp. britannicus).

Some of the broads are surrounded by fens, i.e. reed and sedge beds. Norfolk reed from the broads has been a traditional material for thatching houses.

Specific parts of the Broads have been awarded a variety of conservation designations, for instance:

- Special Protection Area (SPA) status for an area named 'Broadland' composed of 28 Sites of Special Scientific Interest
- Environmentally Sensitive Area (ESA) status for parts of the Halvergate Marshes
- National nature reserve (NNR) status for:
  - Bure Marshes NNR
  - Ant Broads & Marshes NNR
  - Hickling Broad NNR
  - Ludham - Potter Heigham NNR
  - Redgrave and Lopham Fen
  - Martham Broad NNR
  - Calthorpe Broad NNR
  - Mid-Yare NNR

A specific project being considered under the UK Biodiversity Action Plan is the re-introduction of the large copper butterfly, whose habitat has been reduced by reduction of fens.

== See also ==
- The Fens, the area of low-lying once swampy land south of The Wash
- The children's novels Coot Club and The Big Six, both by Arthur Ransome, are set on the Broads
- The British film 45 Years (2015), with Charlotte Rampling and Tom Courtenay, is set on the Broads
- Hunsett Windmill
- Horsey Windpump
