= Wayford Bridge =

Village in Norfolk, England

Coordinates: 52.770259°N 1.477431°E

- Location within Norfolk
- OS grid reference: TG346248
- Civil parish: Smallburgh
- District: North Norfolk
- Shire county: Norfolk
- Region: East
- Country: England
- Sovereign state: United Kingdom

Wayford Bridge is a village on the River Ant on the A149 road, near Stalham in Norfolk, England within The Broads National Park.

Due to height restrictions under the road bridge it is the most northerly point of navigation on the Norfolk Broads for boats over 7 feet 6 inches (2.29 m) in height above the water line. Broads boats can continue to Dilham, though the channel is narrow and has limited places in which to turn around. Wayford Bridge is the southern end of the North Walsham and Dilham Canal.

== Panoramas ==
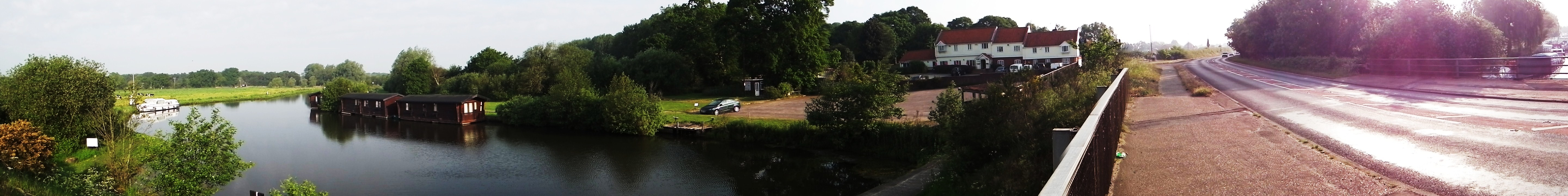
Upstream View of the River Ant at Wayford Bridge
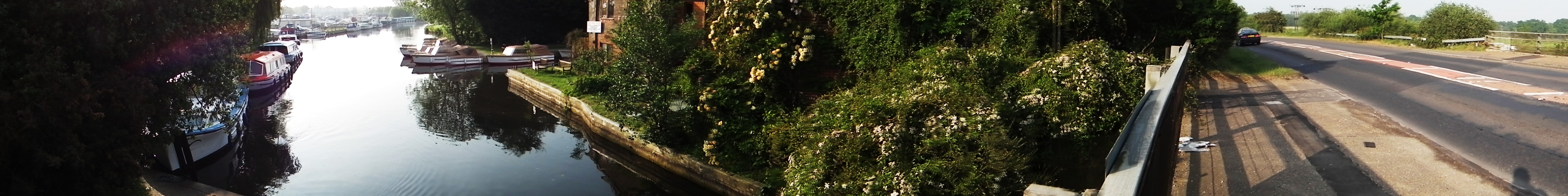
Downstream View of the River Ant at Wayford Bridge
