= Ludham Bridge =

Hamlet in Norfolk, England

Coordinates: 52.6995°N 1.5100°E

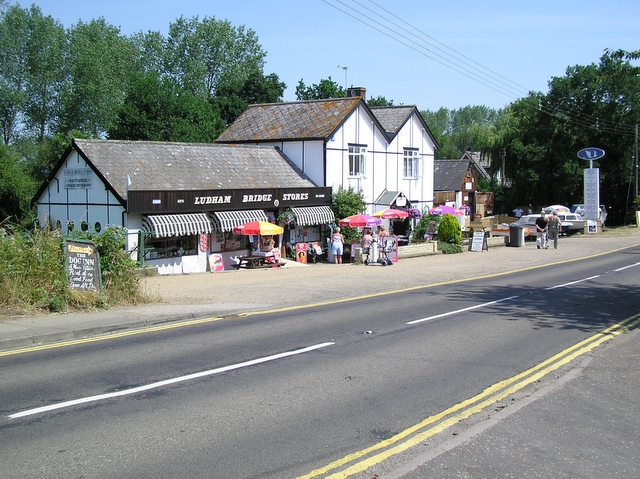
Ludham Bridge Stores, and other buildings on the A1062 main road

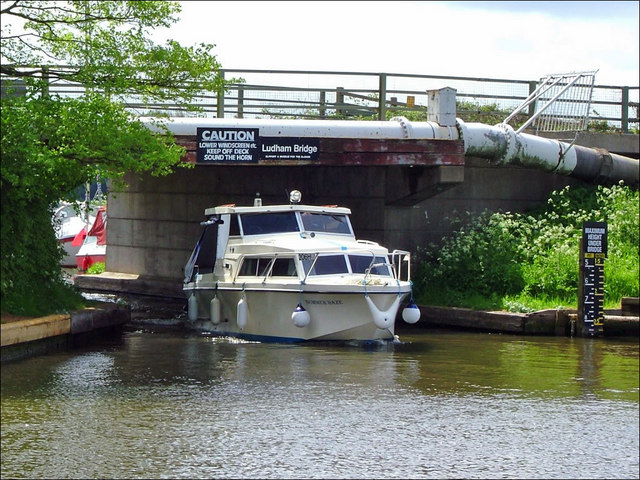
Boat passing under the bridge at Ludham Bridge

Ludham Bridge is a hamlet on the River Ant on the Norfolk Broads in Norfolk, England. It carries road traffic from Wroxham to Potter Heigham on the A1062. The bridge has 2.59 metres (8 feet 6 inches) mean headroom for vessels and to the north has 130 metres of free 24 hours public mooring available to river craft.
