= Antingham =

Village in Norfolk, England

Coordinates: 52°51′02″N 1°20′57″E

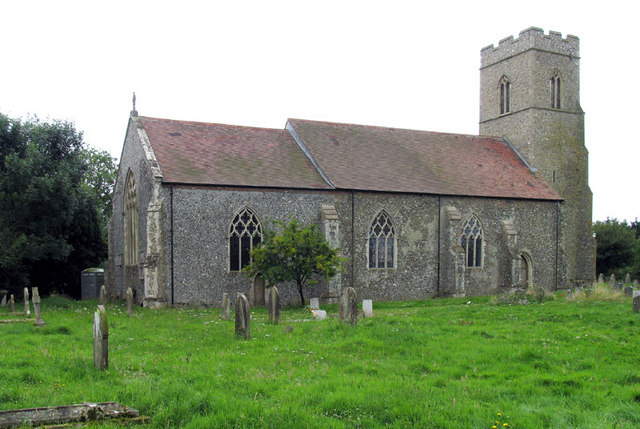
- St Mary and St Margaret's church

- Location within Norfolk
- Area: 6.12 km^{2} (2.36 sq mi)
- Population: 355 (parish, 2011 census)
  - Density: 58/km^{2} (150/sq mi)
- OS grid reference: TG252329
  - London: 134 miles
- Civil parish: Antingham
- District: North Norfolk
- Shire county: Norfolk
- Region: East
- Country: England
- Sovereign state: United Kingdom
- Post town: NORTH WALSHAM
- Postcode district: NR28
- Dialling code: 01263
- Police: Norfolk
- Fire: Norfolk
- Ambulance: East of England
- UK Parliament: North Norfolk

Antingham is a village and civil parish in the north of the English county of Norfolk. The village is located about 6 miles (9.7 km) south of Cromer and 3 miles (4.8 km) north of North Walsham. The civil parish has an area of 6.12 square kilometres (2.36 sq mi) and in the 2001 census had a population of 287 in 120 households, the population increasing to 355 at the 2011 Census. For the purposes of local government, the parish falls within the district of North Norfolk.

== History ==
The name of 'Antingham' originates from an Old English word meaning "homestead of the family or followers of a man called Anta".

Antingham has an entry in the Domesday Book of 1086, where the village, its population, records of land ownership, and details about productive resources are extensively detailed. In the survey Antingham is variously recorded by the names Antigeham, Antingham, and Attinga. The main tenants at the time were Roger Bigod and Thurston Fitzguy. The survey notes the presence of four villagers and four smallholders on the land. A meadow, acreage, and ploughs of various values are among the items recorded under Antingham.

St Mary's parish church, at the south of the village close to the A149 in Church Lane, stands next to the ruins of St Margaret's Church which was abandoned in the late 17th century. Material from St Margaret's was used to repair St Mary's after they had both fallen into disrepair.

The village was struck by an F1/T2 tornado on 23 November 1981, as part of the record-breaking nationwide tornado outbreak on that day.

== Geography ==
The parish of Antingham has boundaries with seven other neighbouring parishes. To the north are the parishes of Thorpe Market and Southrepps. The eastern boundary, which follows the River Ant, is with Swafield, and south are the parishes of North Walsham and Felmingham. To west lies the parishes of Hanworth and Suffield with most of this boundary following the edge of Gunton Park. The parish is dissected north to south by the A149 road from King's Lynn to Great Yarmouth. The parish also straddles the railway line which runs between Sheringham, Cromer and Norwich. In the south east corner of the parish are Antingham Ponds which are the source of the River Ant, a tributary of the River Bure.

The village of Antingham sits on the Southrepps road which is on the eastern side of the A149 and runs north to south from that road to the village of Southrepps. The centre of the village is at the crossroads of Elderton Lane, Sandy Lane and Southrepps Road. There is a level crossing on Southrepps Road 200 metres south of this crossroads.

== Transport ==
The nearest railway station is at Gunton for the Bittern Line which runs between Sheringham, Cromer and Norwich. The nearest Airport is at Norwich which is 17.5 miles (28.2 km) south of the village.
