= Bure Marshes National Nature Reserve =

English nature reserve

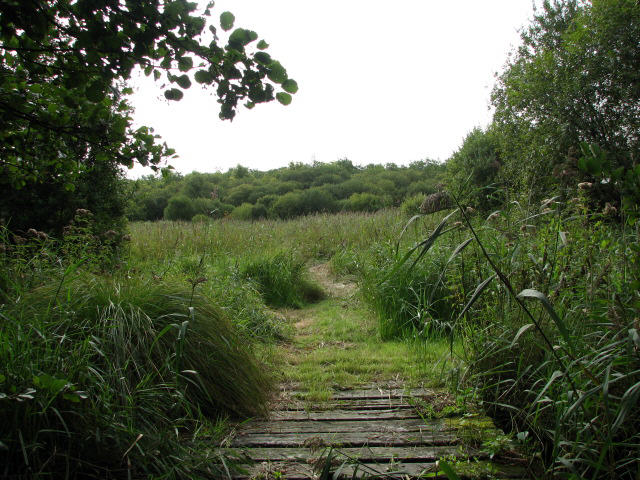
- A path through Bure Marshes NNR
- Type: National Nature Reserve
- Location: Norfolk, England
- Nearest town: Horning, Norfolk
- OS grid: TG338162
- Coordinates: 52.693318°N 1.459821°E
- Area: 451.5 hectares (1,116 acres)
- Created: 1958
- Managed by: Natural England, Norfolk Wildlife Trust

Bure Marshes National Nature Reserve is a national nature reserve (NNR) in Norfolk, England. Created in 1958, the reserve covers 451.5 hectares of wetland within the floodplain of the River Bure.

The reserve contains multiple wetland habitats including broads, dykes, reed beds, fens, and wet woodlands. Most of the woodlands are less than 100 years old. Broads are shallow lakes that formed from medieval peat excavations that flooded in around the 14th century. There are four broads in Bure Marshes NNR, Hoveton Great Broad, Ranworth Broad, Cockshoot Broad, and Decoy Broad.

The reserve contains several rare species of plants including water soldier, milk parsley, and marsh pea. The wetlands serve as habitat for many birds such as kingfishers and great crested grebes. They are also visited by ospreys, as well as many migratory birds including marsh harriers, bitterns, and bearded tits. The wetlands are also home to insects such as swallowtail butterflies, and many species of dragonflies including the rare Norfolk hawker dragonfly. Water voles, otters, grass snakes, and common frogs live in the water.

Bure Marshes NNR is contained within the boundaries of Broads National Park, the Bure Broads and Marshes SSSI, The Broads Special Area of Conservation, and the Broadland Special Protection Area which is a Ramsar site. Within the Bure Marshes NNR, Hoveton Great Broad and the Woodbastwick Marshes are managed by Natural England, while Ranworth Broad and the Ebb and Flow Marshes are managed by Norfolk Wildlife Trust.
