= Acme Space =

Architectural firm

ACME

Practice information
- Key architects: Friedrich Ludewig
- Founded: 2007
- Location: London, United Kingdom

Significant works and honors
- Buildings: Hunsett Mill, John Lewis Leeds, Eastgate Quarters, Beirut City Center, Bahrain Royal Institute
- Awards: RIBA Manser Medal 2010

ACME was established in 2007 in London. The practice operates in the fields of contemporary architecture, urban planning, interior design and product design – working with private, corporate and public clients. Since 2007, ACME has received numerous awards, most notably winning international competitions such as the John Lewis (department store) in Leeds 2007, the Kaufhof Department Store in Duisburg 2008 and the Royal Institute of Human Development in Bahrain 2009. The practice completed its first UK building – Hunsett Mill in Norfolk– in 2009, which received a number of awards, including the RIBA Manser Medal 2010 for the best one-off house in the United Kingdom. On an urban scale, the office has completed a number of masterplans, among them Bishopsgate Goodsyard / London, Birmingham Smithfield, Swansea Parc Tawe, Leeds Eastgate, Chester Northgate and Doha / Qatar.On an architectural scale, ACME has worked on a number of cultural, commercial and residential projects in the UK, Germany, India, Colombia, Spain, Syria, South Korea, Romania, Bahrain, Qatar, Australia, France and the UAE.

== History ==
In spring 2007, Friedrich Ludewig founded ACME with some of his former associates from his time as director at Foreign Office Architects. The practice has grown steadily to its current size of 40 architects of 15 nationalities.

== Awards ==
ACME's first completed project, Hunsett Mill, has won a number of awards, including the RIBA Manser Medal 2010 for the best one-off house in the United Kingdom. World Winners Prix Versailles 2018. The house was also shortlisted for the 'Structural Awards 2009' by the Institution of Structural Engineers and the 'Sustainability Awards 2009', as one of the five most sustainable projects with a budget under £2 million by the UK Green Building Council and Building Magazine. Hunsett Mill was named as one of seven East of England winners in the RIBA Awards for architectural excellence.
