= Calthorpe Broad =

Protected area in Norfolk, England

Coordinates: 52.777°N 1.573°E

- Site of Special Scientific Interest
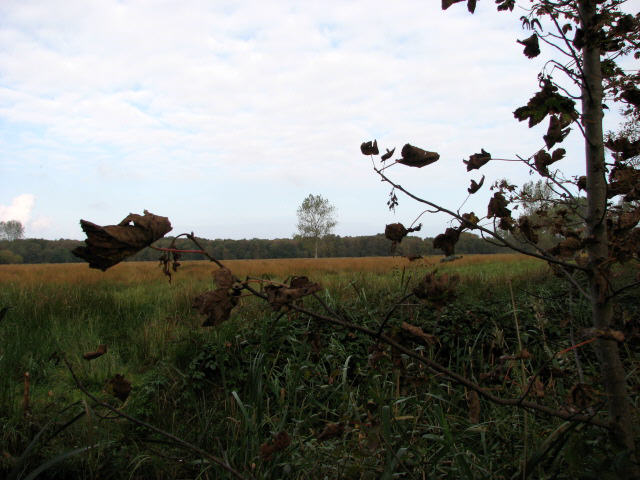
- Location of Calthorpe Broad.
- Area of search: Norfolk
- Grid reference: TG 411 259
- Interest: Biological
- Area: 43.5 hectares (107 acres)
- Notification date: 1984
- Location map: Magic Map

Calthorpe Broad is a 43.5-hectare (107-acre) biological Site of Special Scientific Interest east of Stalham in Norfolk, England. It is a Nature Conservation Review site, Grade I and a national nature reserve. It is also part of the Broadland Ramsar site and Special Protection Area, and The Broads Special Area of Conservation.

This broad has diverse fauna and flora. Water plants include mare's-tail, water violet, blunt-leaved pondweed, spiked water-milfoil, floating scirpus, yellow water-lily and the nationally scarce water soldier.

The site is private land with no public access.
