= Neatishead =

Village in Norfolk, England

Coordinates: 52.73587°N 1.46767°E

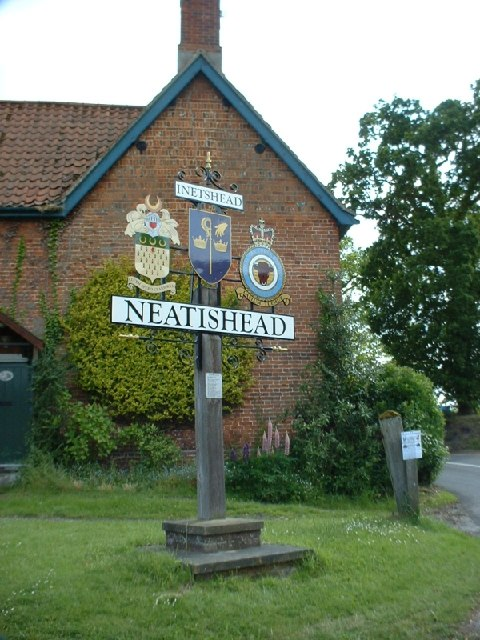
- Signpost in Neatishead

- Location within Norfolk
- Area: 7.71 km^{2} (2.98 sq mi)
- Population: 565 (2011)
  - Density: 73/km^{2} (190/sq mi)
- OS grid reference: TG342210
- Civil parish: Neatishead
- District: North Norfolk
- Shire county: Norfolk
- Region: East
- Country: England
- Sovereign state: United Kingdom
- Post town: NORWICH
- Postcode district: NR12
- Police: Norfolk
- Fire: Norfolk
- Ambulance: East of England

Neatishead (/ˈniːtstəd/ NEET-stəd) is a village and civil parish in the English county of Norfolk. The village is situated some 20 km (12 mi) north-east of the city of Norwich, within The Norfolk Broads and to the west of Barton Broad. Access to Neatishead from the broad is by way of Limekiln Dyke, a narrow channel leading off the broad.

== History ==
The village's name origin is uncertain 'Vassal's household' or perhaps, 'Snaet's household'.

The civil parish has an area of 7.71 km^{2} (2.98 sq mi) and in the 2001 census had a population of 537 in 235 households, the population increasing to 565 at the 2011 census. For local government, the parish falls within the district of North Norfolk.

It is well known due to the nearby RAF Neatishead radar station. Neatishead Windmill was built in the 1810s. It worked by wind until the 1930s, then by engine until the 1970s. The tower survives with some machinery inside.
