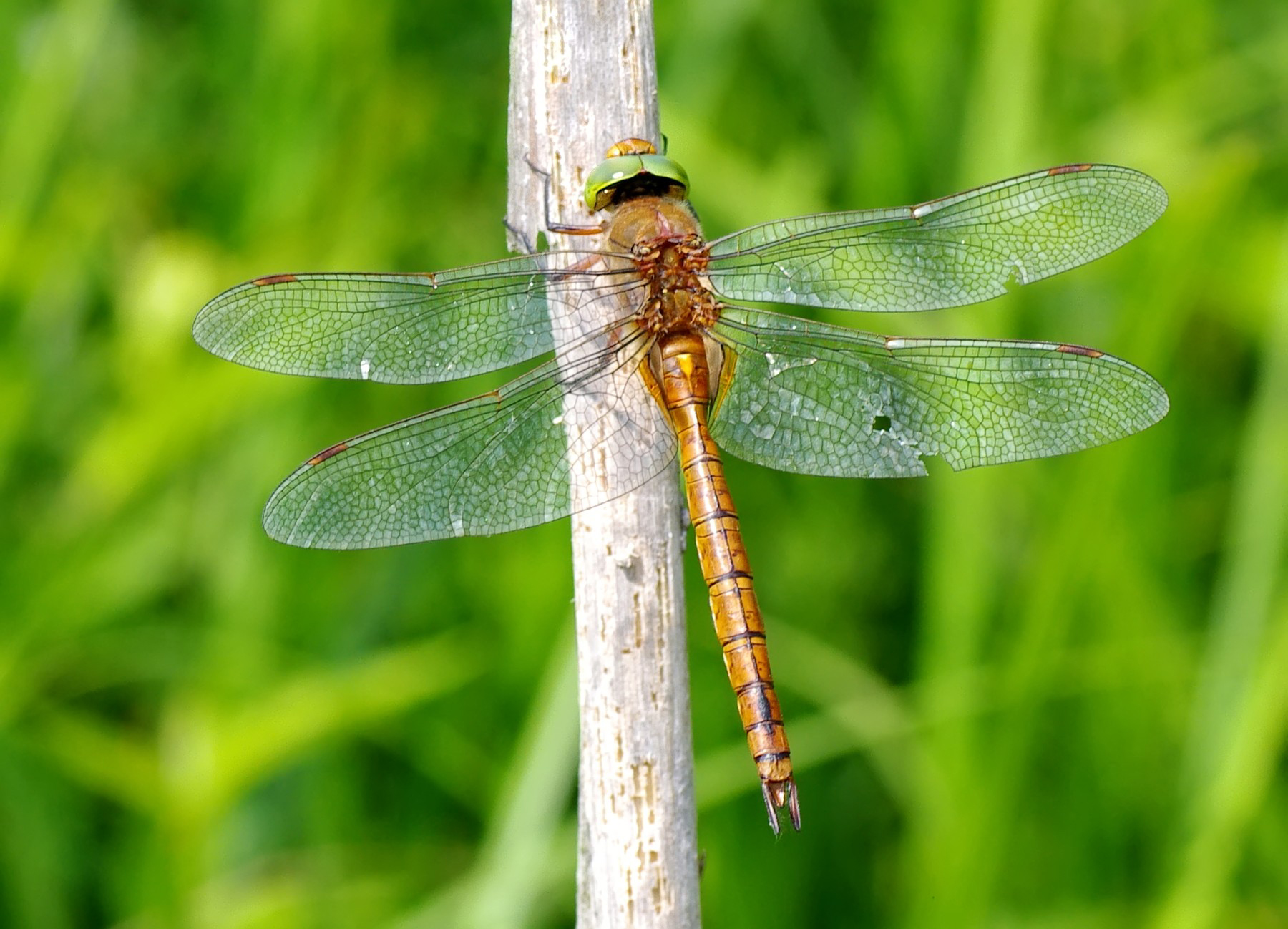

Conservation status
- Least Concern (IUCN 3.1)

Scientific classification
- Kingdom: Animalia
- Phylum: Arthropoda
- Clade: Pancrustacea
- Class: Insecta
- Order: Odonata
- Suborder: Anisoptera
- Family: Aeshnidae
- Genus: Aeshna
- Species: A. isoceles

Binomial name
- Aeshna isoceles (Muller, 1767)
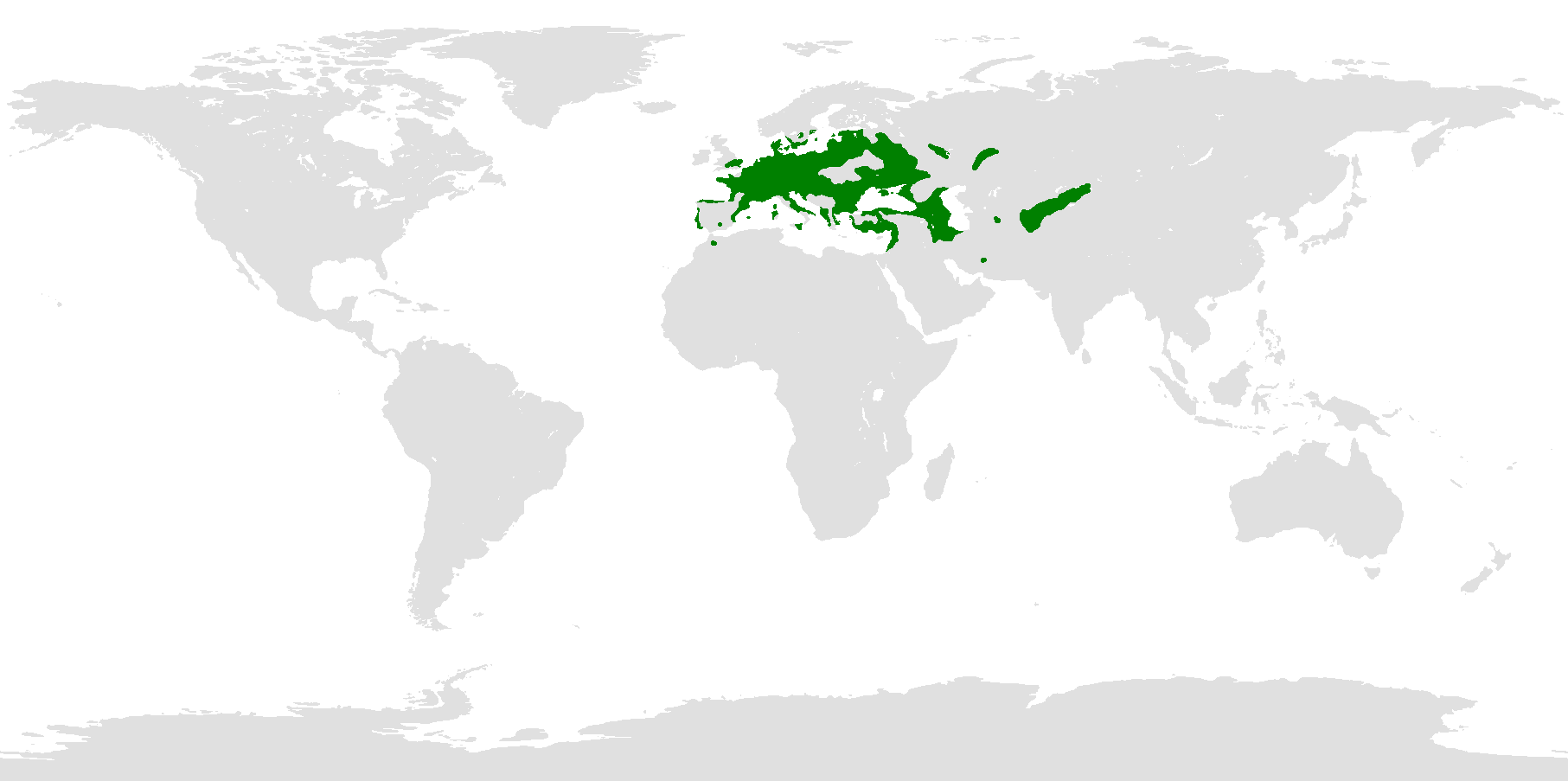
- Range of Aeshna isoceles

= Aeshna isoceles =

Green-eyed hawker

Species of dragonfly

Aeshna isoceles (or isosceles) is a small hawker dragonfly that is found in Europe, mostly around the Mediterranean, and the lowlands of North Africa. Its common name in English is green-eyed hawker. In the United Kingdom it is a localised species, and is called the Norfolk hawker.

Aeshna isoceles is brown, with green eyes, clear wings, and a yellow triangular mark on the second abdominal segment which gave rise to its scientific name. It used to be in the genus Anaciaeschna as it different in several ways from the other members of the genus Aeshna to which it now belongs.

== Identification ==
A. isoceles is one of only two brown hawkers found in Europe, the other is A. grandis. Both have a brown thorax and abdomen but A. isoceles has green eyes and clear wings and a diagnostic yellow triangular mark on the second abdominal segment. The hindwings have an amber patch at their base. In contrast A. grandis has yellowish wings and blueish eyes. The green eye of A. isoceles stands out even in flight and in practice it is not difficult to tell these two dragonflies apart. In addition to the morphological differences A. isoceles is on the wing much earlier in the year than A. grandis.

== Distribution and habitat ==
A. isoceles is found in central Europe and around the Mediterranean and, the lowlands of North Africa. It is more common in eastern Europe than the south western Europe; it occurs in Spain and Portugal but is local.

It is found in wet areas, ponds, ditches and marshes, with dense vegetation and, in studies carried out in England, was found to be associated with Water-soldier (Stratiotes aloides).

=== Status in Britain ===
The Norfolk hawker has always been a scarce and local insect in Britain. It used to be found in the Cambridgeshire fens but by the early 1980s the populations had greatly declined. It is now confined to relatively unpolluted fens and grazing marshes in the Broadlands of Norfolk and north-east Suffolk. It can be found in Hickling Broad and two national nature reserves: Mid-Yare NNR and Ludham - Potter Heigham NNR and at Castle Marshes in the Barnby Broad and Marshes SSSI. Since 2011 the species has also been recorded in the Stour valley in east Kent where egg laying has been observed and it appears to be spreading. It is protected under Schedule 5 of the Wildlife and Countryside Act 1981 and listed in Category 1 (endangered) in the British Red Data Books on Insects.

== Behaviour ==
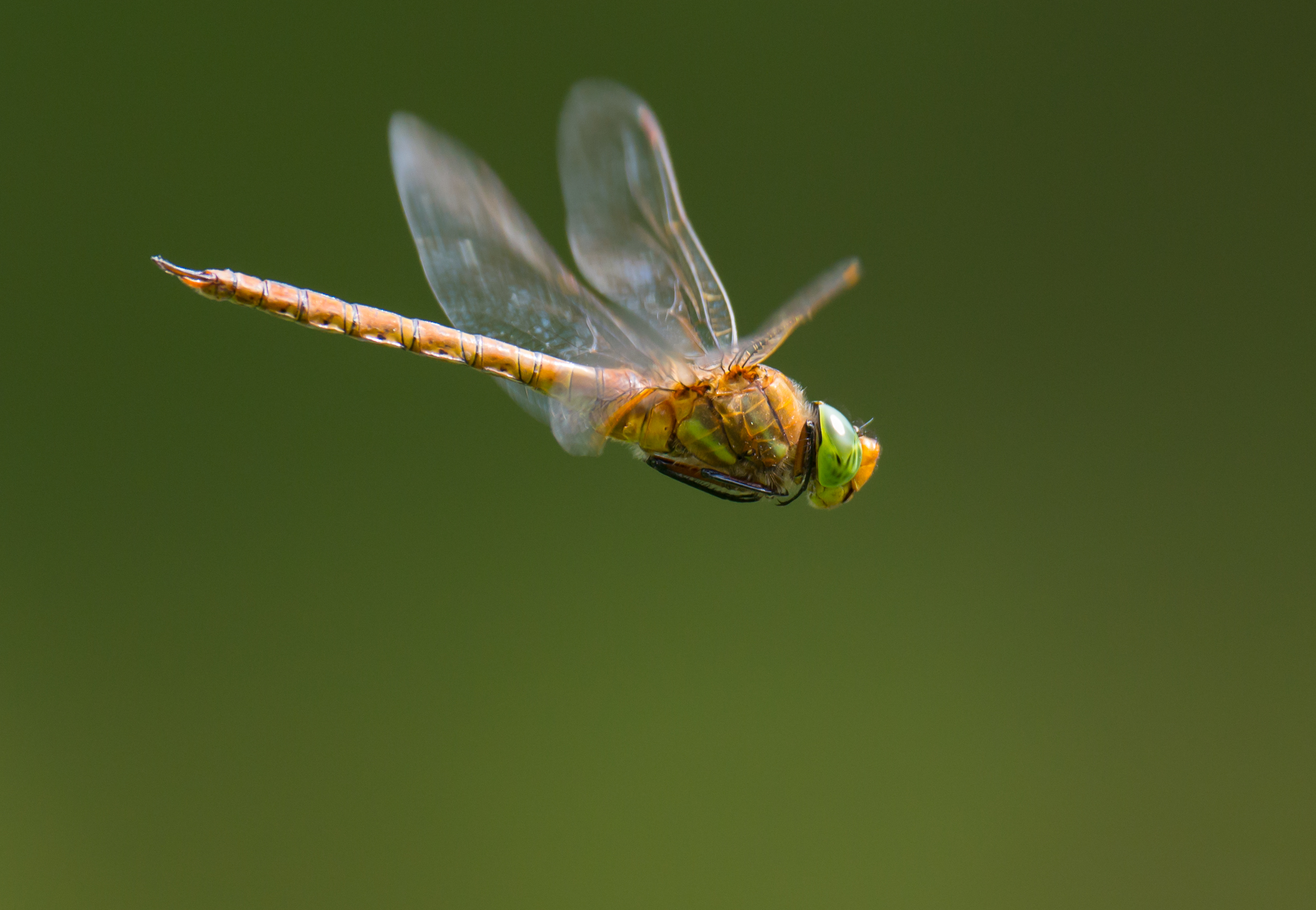
Male in flight

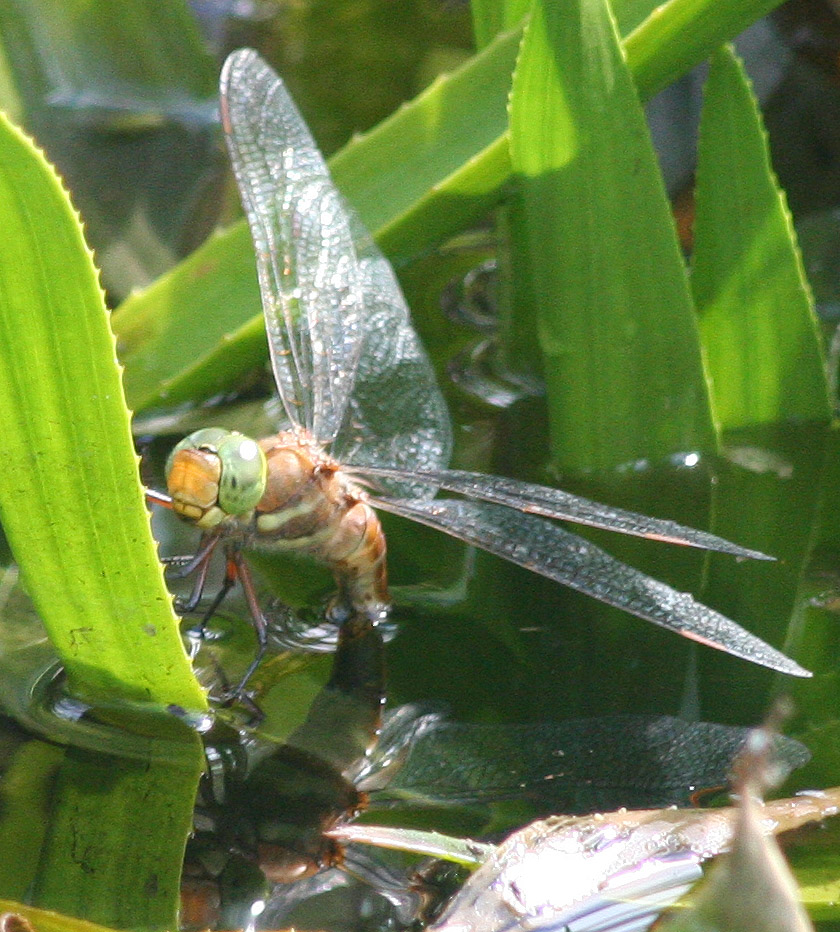
Female in the process of laying eggs

Aeshna isoceles is one of the earliest Aeshna dragonflies to be on the wing with a flight period from May to August. Adults do not spend as much time on the wing as other Aeshnas. Males will fly around over a stretch of water defending a territory and if the pond is small the male will hover over the centre of the pond. Unlike other aeshnas, where the adults seem to be continuously on the wing beating up and down their territory, male A. isoceles come to rest on vegetation from time to time. Females oviposit onto plants and the eggs hatch in about 2 weeks. Larval development takes 2 years.

== Systematics ==
This species was first described as Libellula quadrifasciata, var. 36. isoceles by Muller in 1764. It has since been called Aeshna rufescens and Aeshna chysophthalmus and more recently Anaciaeschna isoceles. It is by this last name that it is referred to in many books. It has since been included into the genus Aeshna and in many books is called Aeshna isoceles: however the original specific name was isosceles. Dijkstra and Lewington (2006) and Boudot JP., et al. (2009) both call it Aeshna isoceles whereas Askew, R.R. (2004), and earlier books, refer to it as Aeshna isosceles.

A molecular phylogenetic analysis of the family Aeshnidae published in 2023 recovered Aeshna isoceles outside the genus Aeshna, leading the authors of the paper to establish a new genus Isoaeschna for the species.

== Sources ==
- Askew, R.R. (2004) The Dragonflies of Europe. (revised ed.) Harley Books. ISBN 0-946589-75-5
- d'Aguilar, J., Dommanget, JL., and Prechac, R. (1986) A field guide to the Dragonflies of Britain, Europe and North Africa. Collins. pp336. ISBN 0-00-219436-8
- Boudot JP., et al. (2009) Atlas of the Odonata of the Mediterranean and North Africa. Libellula Supplement 9:1-256.
- Dijkstra, K-D.B & Lewington, R. (2006) Field Guide to the Dragonflies of Britain and Europe. British Wildlife Publishing. ISBN 0-9531399-4-8.
