= River Bure =

River in Norfolk, England

Coordinates: 52.61751°N 1.72203°E

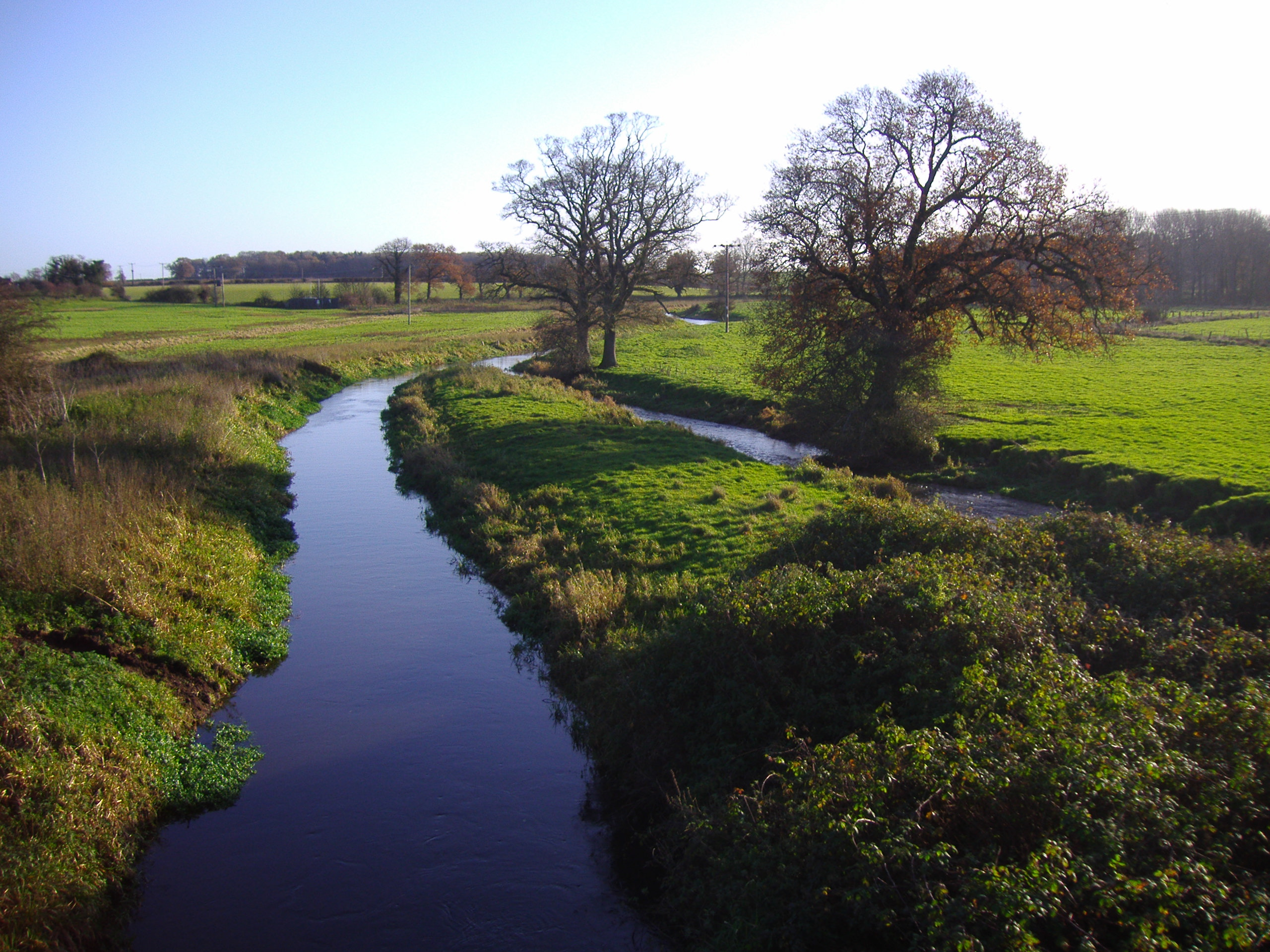
- River Bure at Aylsham

Location
- Country: England

Physical characteristics
- Source
  - location: Near Melton Constable
- Mouth
  - location: Breydon Water, Great Yarmouth
- Length: 50 mi (80 km)

The River Bure is a chalk river in the county of Norfolk, England, most of it in the Broads. The Bure rises near Melton Constable, 11 miles (18 km) upstream of Aylsham, which was the original head of navigation. Nowadays, the head of navigation is 10 miles (16 km) downstream at Coltishall Bridge. After Aylsham Lock and Burgh Bridge, the Bure passes through Buxton Lammas, Coltishall, Belaugh, Wroxham, Horning, past St. Benet's Abbey, through Oby, Acle, Stokesby, along the northern border of the Halvergate Marshes and through Runham before flowing into the River Yare east of Breydon Bridge.

It has two major tributaries, the River Thurne and the River Ant. There is also Muck Fleet which connects the Trinity Broads (Ormesby, Rollesby and Filby Broad) to the main network. Other minor tributaries include the River Hor, which joins the Bure just upstream of Hoveton, The Mermaid which merges at Burgh-next-Aylsham and Scarrow Beck which meets the main river close to the village of Ingworth.

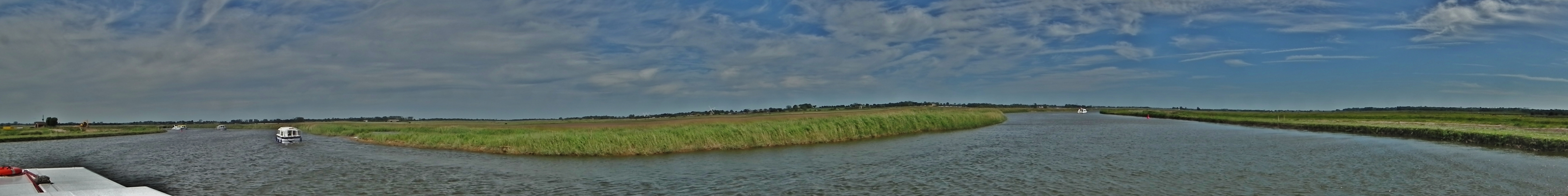
Panoramic view of the River Bure at the mouth of the Upton Dyke

== History ==
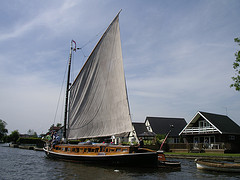
The Wherry Hathor on the river Bure

The River Bure has been navigable for some 31 miles (50 km) as far as Horstead Mill, near Coltishall, since at least 1685, when cargoes of coal, corn and timber were carried to within 1 mile (1.6 km) of Meyton Manor House. It was stated at the time that the river could be improved to enable boats to reach the house. Vessels could not travel beyond Coltishall, and so Aylsham was served by carts, either loaded from wherries at Coltishall and carried north, or loaded from boats at Cromer and carried south.

Plans to extend the limit of navigation were drawn up in 1773. An Act of Parliament was obtained on 7 April 1773, authorising improvements from Coltishall to Aylsham, which John Adey estimated would cost £6,000. Some £1,500 had already been raised or promised, and the balance was to be funded by subscriptions. Adey acted as clerk to the Bure Commissioners, while John Smith was appointed as engineer. Work began on 29 June 1774, and the lock and cut at Coltishall were completed by 16 March 1775, when the first boat used the lock. Progress after that was slow, for in October 1777 Smith announced that he had spent £3,600 so far, but estimated that a further £2,951 would be required to complete the work. It appears that the money had run out, but Smith was persuaded to carry on after 18 traders and landowners provided loans of between £50 and £150. John Green of Wroxham was appointed as joint engineer in March 1779, and the new waterway finally opened in October 1779.

Five locks were provided, at Aylsham, Burgh-near-Aylsham Mill, Oxnead Mill, Buxton Mill at Oxnead Lamas and Coltishall. Within a month, the Commissioners found that silting of the river bed had occurred, reducing the navigable depth, and dredging of the river bed using a scoop, known locally as a didle, was a regular activity. Small wherries, capable of carrying 13 tons, were used for the carriage of flour, agricultural produce, coal and timber. A brickyard at Oxnead was also served by the boats, while below Coltishall, marl was carried away from pits which were served by a system of navigable dikes on the estate of Horstead Hall. The marl trade continued until 1870, but the dikes remain, in an area called Little Switzerland.

At each of the mills, cuts were made to accommodate the locks, but at Aylsham a longer cut of about 1 mile (1.6 km) was made, ending at a basin where warehouses were constructed. Boats could also get from there to Aylsham Mill Pool, which enabled them to deliver grain and carry flour away. The navigation was reasonably successful until 1880, when railway competition arrived, in the form of the East Norfolk Railway, which followed the Bure valley. The East Norfolk later became part of the Great Eastern Railway. Further competition arrived in 1883, when the Eastern and Midlands Railway opened a railway station near the terminal basin on its line from Melton Constable to North Walsham. Despite this, wherries were using the navigation until 1912, when a disastrous flood damaged the locks. Assessment of the damage suggested that repairs would cost £4,500, which the Commissioners could not find, and so the navigation was abandoned. This act was formalised in 1928, when it was officially abandoned. Oxnead Lamas Lock was filled in, in 1933, but the other structures remain, although the lock gates have been replaced by sluices.

== See also ==
- Bure Valley Railway, a heritage railway
- Bure Valley Path
- Bure Marshes NNR, a national nature reserve
- Bure (HM Prison), a Category C men's prison in Scottow, Norfolk named after the river.
