= Ludham - Potter Heigham Marshes =

UK Site of Special Scientific Interest

Coordinates: 52.705°N 1.561°E

- Site of Special Scientific Interest
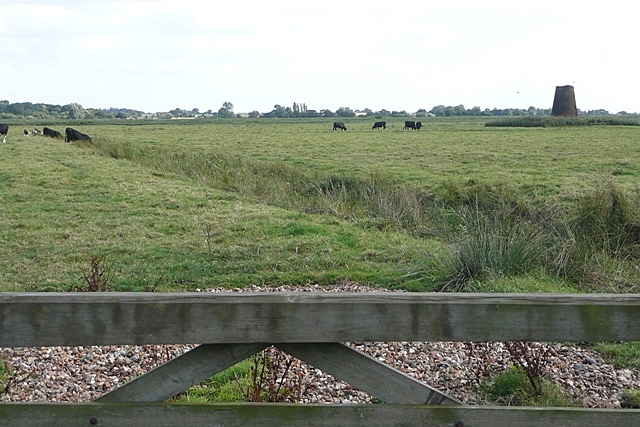
- Location of Ludham - Potter Heigham Marshes.
- Area of search: Norfolk
- Grid reference: TG 407 179
- Interest: Biological
- Area: 101.5 hectares (251 acres)
- Notification date: 1990
- Location map: Magic Map

Ludham - Potter Heigham Marshes is a 101.5-hectare (251-acre) biological Site of Special Scientific Interest north-east of Norwich in Norfolk, England. Part of the site is a Nature Conservation Review site, Grade I, and a National Nature Reserve. It is part of the Broadland Ramsar site and Special Protection Area, and The Broads Special Area of Conservation.

This is described by Natural England as "both a nationally important wetland site and one of the richest areas of traditionally managed grazing marsh and dykes now remaining in Broadland". The principal conservation lies in the aquatic flora and fauna of the dykes, especially the dragonflies.

Public footpaths cross the site.
