= Barton Broad =

Nature reserve north-east of Norwich in Norfolk

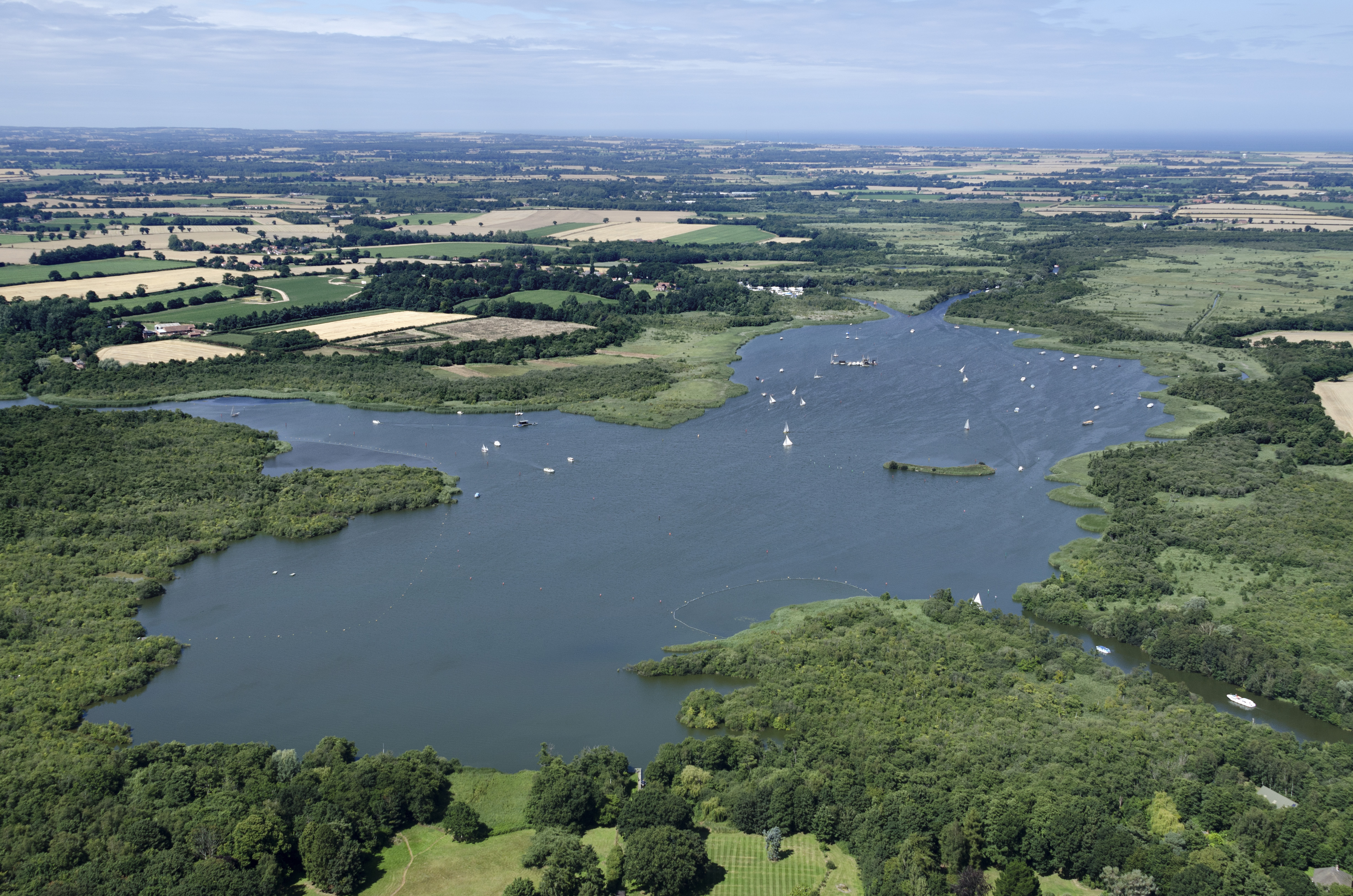
- Interactive map of Barton Broad
- Type: Nature reserve
- Location: Norwich, Norfolk
- OS grid: TG 350 207
- Coordinates: 52.73864°N 1.49604°E
- Area: 164 hectares (410 acres)
- Manager: Norfolk Wildlife Trust

Barton Broad is a large lake that forms part of the River Ant which gives its name to a 164-hectare (410-acre) nature reserve north-east of Norwich in Norfolk. The reserve is owned and managed by the Norfolk Wildlife Trust. It is part of the Ant Broads and Marshes Site of Special Scientific Interest and National Nature Reserve, and part of it is in the Ant Marshes Nature Conservation Review site, Grade I. It is part of the Broadland Ramsar site and Special Protection Area, and The Broads Special Area of Conservation.

== History ==
During the 13th and 14th centuries, large quantities of peat were extracted in Norfolk, and most of the peat extraction was organised by the monks of St Benet's Abbey, the ruins of which are located on the bank of the River Bure, a short distance downstream from its junction with the River Ant. Barton Broad was created in this way in the Middle Ages, and the River Ant was diverted through the peat workings in around 1730, to allow navigation. The activity of the monks was forgotten, but in 1834 Samuel Woodward suggested that the broads might be artificial, rather than naturally occurring features, after studies of Barton Broad. However, this idea was not generally accepted, and the artificial nature of the Broads was not clearly understood until the 1960s. Because of its connection to the North Sea at Great Yarmouth through the River Ant and the River Bure, Barton Broad is slightly tidal, although the water level only varies by about 6 inches (15 cm). The Broad provides habitat for a diverse collection of aquatic plants and fish, and the surrounding fens have nationally rare plants and invertebrates.

It is believed that Lord Nelson learnt to sail on Barton Broad prior to joining the navy when he was aged 12. The broad was owned by his sister at the time. There are several staithes connected to the broad by channels, including Catfield Wood End staithe to the east and Old Lime Kiln Dyke which ends at a staithe at Neatishead to the west. Britain's first solar powered passenger boat, called Ra, operated from Neatishead staithe.

Photographs taken in the late-19th and early-20th centuries show that water quality at the time was good, supporting large lily beds with reed swamp fringing the banks of the broad. In the 1800s, the broad consisted of 284 acres (115 ha) of open water, surrounded by 84 acres (34 ha) of reed swamp. Conditions then deteriorated, with the clear water becoming cloudy and lifeless, while only small clumps of reed swamp remained around the edges. The water was clogged with mud and algae, and algal blooms contained toxins which could be fatal to farm animals and domestic pets. The beautiful Pleasure Island, in the middle of the Broad, became degraded as the reeds which protected it from wash created by boats and from wind-generated waves died back, resulting in the banks being scoured away. The Broad continued to be used by leisure boats, and was also the home of the Nancy Oldfield Trust, a group which helped people with limited mobility to experience the joys of sailing. They recorded the steady decline in water quality and in the depth of water, and by 1985 there was only 2.5 acres (1 ha) of reed swamp left.

There were two main causes of this decline. The growth of population led to the construction of municipal sewage treatment works, which discharged treated effluent containing high concentrations of phosphorus into the rivers. The first was at North Walsham, which commenced operation in 1924. Agricultural practices used high volumes of fertilisers, and resulted in nitrogen leaching into the water. These two chemicals resulted in phytoplankton proliferating. Up to one million of these minute algae, only 10 microns across, could be found in every cubic centimetre of water, starving the native plants of light, and then settling on the bottom of the Broad when they died, reducing the depth of water available for navigation. A survey to assess the size of the problem found that for sailing boats with keels, there was only a narrow central strip of water with sufficient depth, and even that contained shallow spots. The bottom of the Broad was covered in thick black silt topped with a thicker layer of oozy sludge.

=== Remediation ===
Those responsible for the Broads decided that a programme of works to rectify the situation needed to be carried out. There would be four parts to the process, which would involve a substantial reduction in the amount of phosphorus discharged into the river system, a similar reduction in the amount of nitrogen entering the waterways, the removal of large volumes of sediment containing these chemicals from the Broad, and some bio-manipulation of the water.

Anglian Water operated two main sewage treatment works that affected Barton Broad, at Stalham and North Walsham. At Stalham they installed tertiary treatment in 1977, and a phosphate-stripping plant in 1982, to remove phosphorus from the treated effluent. At North Walsham, the effluent was diverted away from the river in 1980, and carried by pipeline to be discharged into the North Sea. This resulted in a step change in the levels of phosphorus found in the water. To reduce nitrogen levels, local farmers were given advice about how to use chemicals more responsibly through an education programme. Responsibility for the Broads changed in 1988, when they became a National Park, and the Broads Authority was set up in 1989 to manage the park. The cost of removing huge volumes of contaminated sludge was significant, but an application was made to the National Lottery's Millennium Commission, as the restoration of wetland habitat seems a good fit to the requirements of that fund. The scheme was called the Barton Broad Clear Water 2000 project, and the bid was successful when £1.2 million was awarded to the Broads Authority. This was supplemented by £200,000 from the Soap and Detergent Industry Association, and £1.5 million from the Broads Navigation Committee.

A series of lagoons were created on nearby agricultural land, and a suction dredger was used to pump sludge from the bottom of the Broad through a floating pipeline to the lagoons. The volume of sludge would gradually reduce to about one third of its size through drying and shrinkage. The lagoons covered 52 acres (21 ha), and eventually held some 340,000 cubic yards (260,000 m^{3}) of silt. This operation started in November 1995 and was completed in August 2000. During this period, Anglian Water installed DynaSand sand filters at Stalham sewage treatment works, to further reduce levels of phosphorus. Once the sludge had dried out, it was covered with the original top soil from the site, and the land was returned to agriculture.

The fourth stage used bio-manipulation, a process developed by the Broads Authority and the Environment Agency. This uses daphnia, commonly known as water fleas, which naturally filter water and remove bacteria and algae from it. However, they are usually eaten by small fish at a faster rate than they can remove the algae. To overcome this problem, pike and perch were introduced to the Broad, and significantly reduced the numbers of small fish, allowing the daphnia to thrive. This process could not be applied to the whole lake, and so controlled areas were created, separated from the body of the Broad by butyl rubber skirts, attached to a floation collar at the top and a weighted collar at the bottom to act as a seal onto the bed of the lake. Gauze filters at intervals along the skirts allowed water to pass between controlled and non-controlled areas, but prevented the passage of fish. Pleasure Island was reconstructed using gabions filled with stone pebbles to rebuild the edge of the island, which were covered in coir matting planted with reed-swamp flowers. The surface of the island was built up with dredgings topped with peat, and planted with wild flowers.

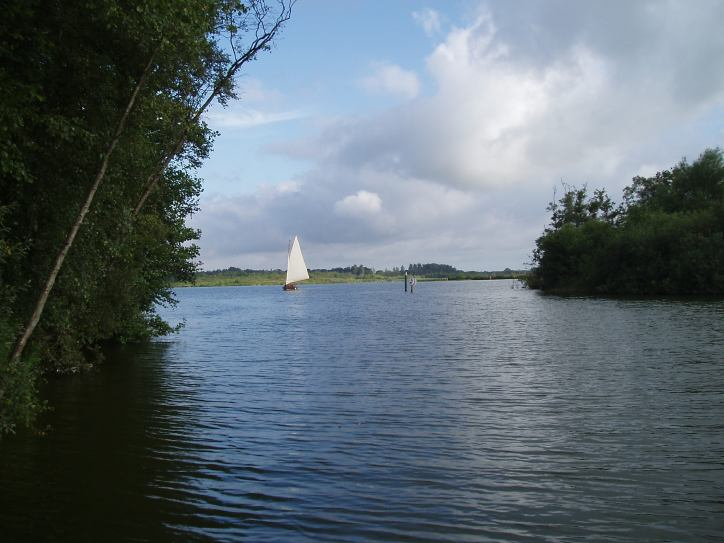
Sailing boat on Barton Broad

There is public access to the Barton Broad reserve. The Millennium Commission grant was conditional on public access being improved, and a number of boardwalks were created to allow pedestrians to view and enjoy the broad and nature reserve. The Clear Water 2000 project also included funding for an electric boat and charging shed, but by the time it was purchased, the design had changed a little, and the boat had a roof covered in solar cells to recharge the batteries. The boat was named Ra, and the facilities provided for it on shore were fully compliant with the access for all legislation, enabling wheelchair users to use them and to access the boat. A second boat, the Electric Eel, offered trips along the narrow channels at the edge of the Broad, and canoes can be used to investigate the really narrow connecting waterways. Norfolk Wherries are again able to enter the Broad because of its increased depth, and it is possible to hire one, including a skipper and a cook for a leisurely cruise. Both Ra and Electric Eel have since moved to other locations.

== Bibliography ==
- Fisher, Stuart (2013). British River Navigations. Bloomsbury Publishing. ISBN 978-1-4729-0084-5.
- Laverick, John FICE (2017). Voyaging the World's Civil Engineering Wonders. The History Press. ISBN 978-1-80399-098-9.
