= River Ant =

River in Norfolk, England

Ant
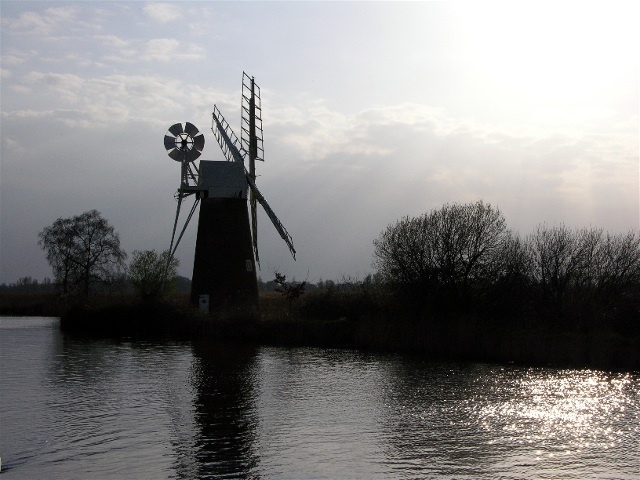
- The river at How Hill

- Location of the river mouth within Norfolk

Location
- Country: England
- Region: Norfolk

Physical characteristics
- Source
  - location: Antingham
  - coordinates: 52.8507°N 1.3533°E
  - elevation: 27 m (89 ft)
- Mouth: River Bure
  - location: Ant Mouth, south of Ludham Bridge
  - coordinates: 52.6896°N 1.5131°E
  - elevation: 0 m (0 ft)
- Length: 27.3 km (17.0 mi)

Basin features
- River system: River Bure

The River Ant is a tributary river of the River Bure in the county of Norfolk, England. It is 27 kilometres (17 mi) long (of which 8.75 miles are now navigable), and has an overall drop of 27 metres from source to mouth. It is said that the Ant was formerly known as the River Smalea and that this is the origin of the name of the village of Smallburgh. The modern name is a back-formation from Antingham.

The Ant Broads & Marshes NNR is a national nature reserve.

== From source to Honing ==
The river's source is just east of the village of Antingham in North Norfolk at Antingham Ponds. Just below the pools the river's route has been used as a canal in the past, starting at what was Antingham bone mill. An Act of Parliament established the North Walsham and Dilham Canal in 1812, as a wide gauge canal able to take a Norfolk wherry. It was built at a cost of £30,000 and opened on 25 July 1826, making the river navigable as far as Dilham, where the river widens and deepens. It carried manure, offal, flour, coal, and farm produce. In 1885, the canal was sold for £600, but the canal company's solicitor disappeared with the money. The flood of 1912 washed away several staithes. The wherry "Ella" made the final trading journey on the canal from Bacton staithe in 1934. The canal was never nationalised and still belongs to the North Walsham Canal Company. The river, now in its canal form, curves around the north east of the town of North Walsham passing Bacton Wood Mill. Below Bacton Mill the canal reaches a lock at Ebridge mill. The lock is in poor condition but it is hoped that this section of canal will one day be restored and made navigable again. Further on at Briggate Bridge there is another mill and another disused lock.

== Norfolk Broads (The Broads Authority) ==
At Honing Bridge the course enters The Broads, administered by The Broads Authority. Here the canal cuts through a marshy wooded area called Dilham Broad and again curves to the east before resuming its southerly course to pass under Tonnage Bridge. Below the bridge, it passes through Broad Fen, an area containing many drainage channels, and meets Tyler's Cut or Dilham Dyke, which runs off to the west. It served the villages of Dilham and Smallburgh, and was the furthest north that the River Ant could be navigated prior to the construction of the North Walsham and Dilham Canal. Below the junction, the course reverts to the river, although it is no longer obvious where the original course of the river was above this point. At Wayford Bridge the river passes the Wayford Bridge Hotel and a row of chalets on pontoons, moored against the east bank of the river. The bridge is a modern concrete slab which carries the A149 road, with around 7 feet (2.1 m) of headroom, making it only passable by small pleasure craft.

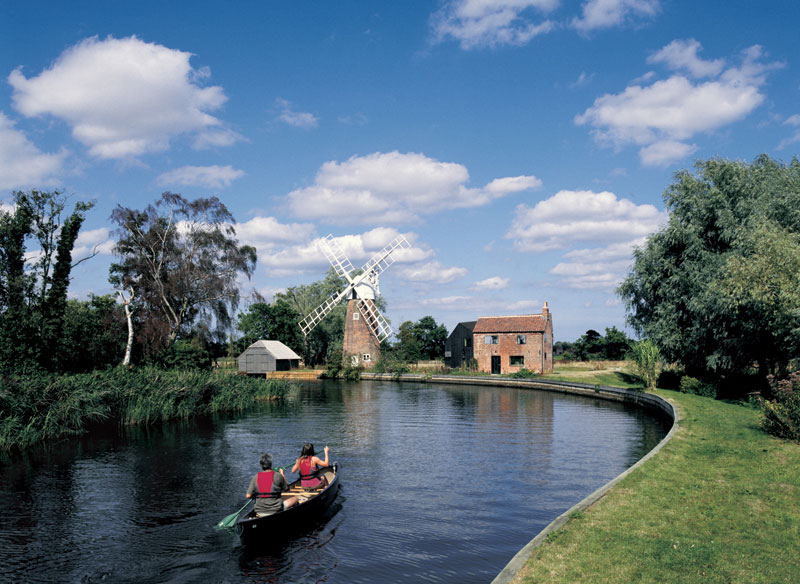
River Ant at Hunsett Windmill

During excavations for a new road in 1976, the remains of what was probably a Roman boat were discovered in the peat about 40 feet (12 m) to the north-west of the bridge. The remains were dug out by a mechanical excavator, before it was realised what they were. The work also discovered part of a wooden causeway, which ran from the site towards the ford which existed prior to the first bridge being built in 1797. Just below the bridge, a wooden dug-out canoe was discovered during dredging operations on the river in 1927. It was subsequently found to date from 720, and is the oldest boat found in Norfolk. A Roman road ran from the west side of the bridge to Water Newton in Cambridgeshire, but no trace of it has been found to the east of the bridge.

Continuing downstream there are boat yards on both banks and the river passes the ruined remains of Moy's Drainage Mill, probably named after Percy Moy, who farmed land drained by the mill in the 1920s. The mill powered a single scoop wheel, which could also be driven by an auxiliary engine when there was no wind. It was operational until some time after 1935, but by 2007 only about 8 feet (2.4 m) of the tower remained, and a Lister diesel engine drove the pump. The river follows a fairly straight course until it reaches the photogenic Hunsett Drainage Mill. The structure dates from 1860, and originally drove two scoop wheels to raise water into the river. It was restored externally in 1945, but does not contain any internal machinery. The river turns to the south and passes a channel leading eastwards to the staithes at Stalham and Sutton. Stalham Dyke turns to the north-east, to reach a network of jetties and boat years, while Sutton Dyke continues dues east to the staithe, passing through Sutton Broad which is no longer open water, as the navigation channel is flanked on both sides by reedbeds. The river banks of Barton Fen are crowded with trees, marshes, and reeds, the latter formerly harvested and used for thatching for centuries past.

=== Barton Broad ===
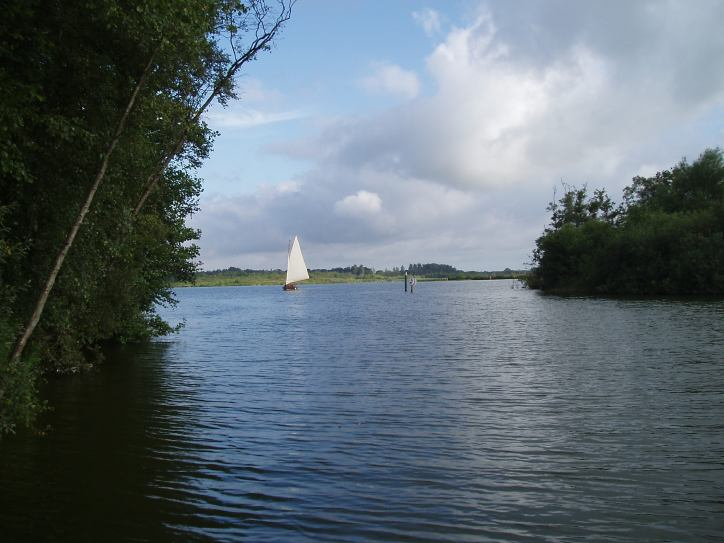
Barton Broad

As the river nears Barton Broad it passes a triangular island called The Heater. The channels either side lead to Barton Turf staithe and its boatyard. The river now enters Barton Broad, the second largest of the Broads, its size only exceeded by Hickling Broad. It has a surface area of 170 acres (0.69 km^{2}) and since 1995, much work has been carried out to increase the amount of open water and to dredge polluted mud from the bottom of the broad. Despite opposition from Natural England, the Broads Authority used curtains of bubbles to stop fish from entering the broad. This allowed water fleas to proliferate, which cleared the cloudy water. The broad is a nature reserve managed by the Norfolk Wildlife Trust and a Site of Special Scientific Interest (SSSI).

Barton Broad is unique in that it has an island, called "Pleasure Hill". It is believed that Lord Nelson learnt to sail on Barton Broad prior to joining the navy when he was aged 12. The broad was owned by his sister at the time. There are several staithes connected to the broad by channels, including Catfield Wood End staithe to the east and Old Lime Kiln Dyke which ends at a staithe at Neatishead to the west. Britain's first solar powered passenger boat, called Ra, operates from Neatishead staithe.

=== Lower river ===
The Ant leaves Barton Broad at its south east corner, at a point which is officially the normal tidal limit It enters a stretch called "The Shoals" to the east of Irstead, a village with some fine thatched and half-timbered cottages. The church building of St Michael is grade II* listed, and much of the fabric dates from the 14th and 15th centuries, although it was restored in 1839 and 1844. Like the cottages, it has a thatched roof. As the river meanders through the flat Broadland countryside, there are several drainage mills along its banks. The first is Clayrack Drainage Mill, near to the entrance to Crome's Broad. This was moved here from Ranworth Marshes in 1981, as it was derelict and at risk of being lost forever. It is one of only three hollow post windpumps in Norfolk, and is maintained by the Norfolk Windmills Trust. After being moved, it was restored in 1983 by Richard Seago, and in 2018 its sails had been removed for repair. A little further downstream, also on the east bank is Boardman's Windmill. It was built in the late 1800s, and in 1926 the original scoopwheel was replaced by an Apploid turbine. It ceased working in 1938 after it was damaged in a storm. Restoration by the Norfolk Windmills Trust began in 1981 and a cap and sails have been fitted, although they do not drive the turbine. Turf Fen drainage mill is on the west bank, and was built around 1875 to drain Horning marshes into the river. It ceased working in 1944, and was restored between 1984 and 1987. The scoop wheel was refurbished in 2007, but by 2018, it did not have any sails.

Next the river passes How Hill nature reserve, which is open to the public. There are a number of nature trails, passing through sedge beds, marsh meadow and carr woodland. Access is on foot, or in an electric boat. The site includes Toad Hole Cottage, a small marshman's house which was refurbished in the 1980s, and is furnished to show what life was like in the 1880s. Visitors can also walk through the gardens, where there is a tea room, but the grade II listed How Hill House is an educational centre, and is not open to the public. How Hill staithe has a thatched boathouse, and the reeds which are cut for thatching are often stacked on the staithe to allow them to dry. Below How Hill the river makes a wide horseshoe bend, passing Neaves Drainage mill as it heads towards Ludham Bridge. The mill was built in 1870, but was becoming derelict in the 1970s. The wooden boat-shaped cap was replaced by an aluminium one in 2009, as the wood was rotten, and it lacks sails. Ludham Bridge drainage mill was built around 1877, but had lost its sails and fantail by 1934. During the Second World War it was used as a pillbox by the home guard. Just the brick tower remains, and it has a distinctive lean to one side. It was built to supplement the larger Beaumont's drainage mill to the south of Ludham Bridge, which was built between 1800 and 1802 when Ludham Marshes were enclosed. Both mills were assisted by a steam pumping engine, which was constructed closer to the bridge in the 1890s. Beaumont's mill became derelict in the 1940s and was demolished in the 1960s.

Ludham Bridge carries the A1062 road over the Ant. The tidal influence on the river at the bridge is about 7 inches (18 cm). The river turns sharply east before straightening out a little. It then turns south and enters the river Bure at Ant Mouth. To the east of the junction are the remains of St James's Hospital. Only the chapel, built in the 14th century and converted into a barn in the 18th, remains. To the west of the junction are the ruins of St Benet's Abbey, founded in 1019 by Benedictine monks. It is a scheduled monument and the designation covers a long causeway, which linked it to St James's Hospital.

== Shipping ==
The remains of an Anglo-Saxon boat were found by the Environment Agency in August 2010 when working on the river during vital flood defence work. The boat, around 3 m (9.8 ft) long, had been hollowed out by hand from a single piece of oak and was found at the bottom of the river between Honing Hall and Brown's Hill. Five animal skulls were found near the boat, which was taken to specialists in York to be treated with special preservatives. Once the treatment has been completed the boat will be delivered to the Castle Museum in Norwich and put on display to the public.

A special type of Norfolk wherry was used on the Ant, measuring up to 50 by 12 feet (15.2 m × 3.7 m).

== Water quality ==
The Environment Agency measure the water quality of the river systems in England. Each is given an overall ecological status, which may be one of five levels: high, good, moderate, poor and bad. There are several components that are used to determine this, including biological status, which looks at the quantity and varieties of invertebrates, angiosperms and fish. Chemical status, which compares the concentrations of various chemicals against known safe concentrations, is rated good or fail.

The water quality of the River Ant system was as follows in 2019.

Section	Ecological status	Chemical status	Length	Catchment	Channel
North Walsham and Dilham Canal	Moderate	Fail	14.0 miles (22.5 km)	20.96 square miles (54.3 km^{2})	heavily modified
Smallburgh Watercourse	Good	Fail	3.4 miles (5.5 km)	6.73 square miles (17.4 km^{2})	heavily modified
Ant (Dilham to R. Bure)	Moderate	Fail	8.0 miles (12.9 km)	21.13 square miles (54.7 km^{2})	heavily modified

The reasons for the quality being less than good are largely a result of the physical modification of the channel, and for the North Walsham and Dilham Canal section, the volume of surface water and groundwater abstracted for agriculture and land management. Some improvements have been made to this section, as it was rated Bad from 2013 to 2015. Like most rivers in the UK, the chemical status changed from good to fail in 2019, due to the presence of polybrominated diphenyl ethers (PBDE) and perfluorooctane sulphonate (PFOS), neither of which had previously been included in the assessment.

== Bibliography ==
- Boyes, John; Russell, Ronald (1977). The Canals of Eastern England. David and Charles. ISBN 978-0-7153-7415-3. ISSN 0161-9284.
- Cumberlidge, Jane (2009). Inland Waterways of Great Britain (8th Ed.). Imray Laurie Norie and Wilson. ISBN 978-1-84623-010-3.
- Fisher, Stuart (2013). British River Navigations. Bloomsbury Publishing. ISBN 978-1-4729-0084-5.
- Turner, James (1954). Rivers of East Anglia. Cassell & Company.
