= List of Royal Society for the Protection of Birds reserves =

This is a list of Royal Society for the Protection of Birds (RSPB) reserves.

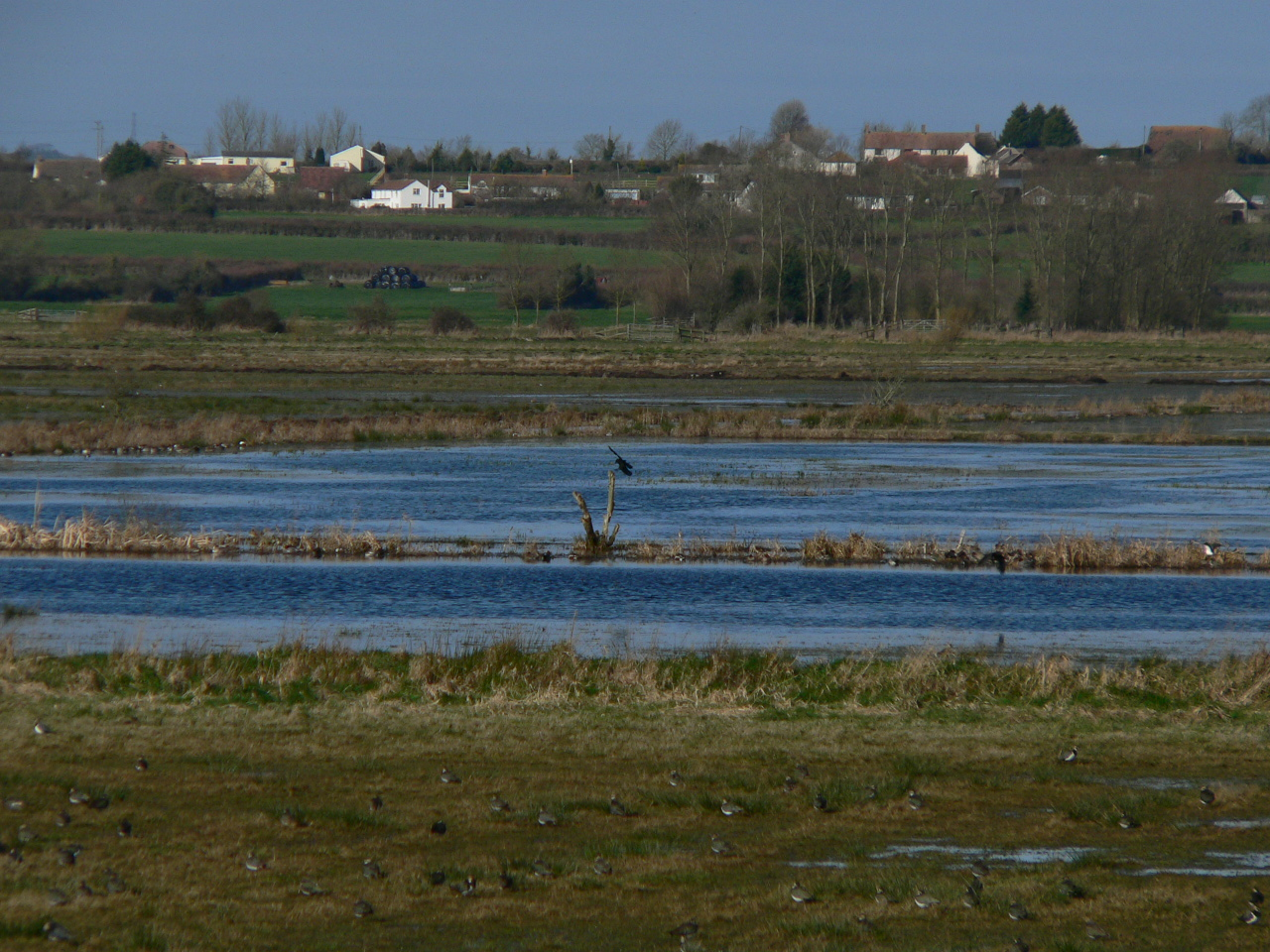
A lake at the RSPB West Sedgemoor nature reserve in Somerset

== England ==
=== A ===
- Adur Estuary, Shoreham-by-Sea, West Sussex
- Amberley Wild Brooks, West Sussex
- Arne, Dorset
- Aylesbeare Common, Devon

=== B ===
- Beckingham Marshes, Nottinghamshire
- Bempton Cliffs, East Riding of Yorkshire
- Berney Marshes, Norfolk
- Blacktoft Sands, East Riding of Yorkshire
- Blean Woods, Kent
- Bowling Green Marsh, Devon
- Brading Marshes, Isle of Wight
- Breydon Water, Norfolk
- Broadwater Warren, Kent
- Buckenham Marshes, Norfolk
- Burton Mere Wetlands, Cheshire

=== C ===
- Campfield Marsh, Cumbria
- Chapel Wood, Devon
- Church Wood, Buckinghamshire
- Cliffe Pools, Kent
- Consall Wood
- Coombes Valley, Staffordshire
- Coquet Island, off Amble, Northumberland

=== D ===
- Dingle Marshes, Suffolk
- RSPB Dungeness, Kent

=== E ===
- Elmley Marshes, Kent
- Exminster Marshes, Devon

=== F ===
- Fairburn Ings, West Yorkshire
- Farnham Heath, Surrey
- Fen Drayton Lakes, Cambridgeshire
- Fore Wood, East Sussex
- Fowlmere, Cambridgeshire
- Frampton Marsh, Lincolnshire
- Freiston Shore, Lincolnshire

=== G ===
- Garston Wood, Dorset
- Gayton Sands, Cheshire
- Geltsdale RSPB reserve, Cumbria
- Greylake, part of the Greylake SSSI Somerset

=== H ===
- Ham Wall, Somerset
- Havergate Island, Suffolk
- Haweswater, Cumbria
- Hayle Estuary, Cornwall
- Highnam Woods, Gloucestershire
- Hodbarrow RSPB reserve, Cumbria

=== L ===
- Labrador Bay, Devon
- Lakenheath Fen, Suffolk
- Langford Lowfields, Nottinghamshire
- Langstone Harbour, Hampshire
- Leighton Moss, Silverdale, Lancashire
- The Lodge, Bedfordshire
- Lodmoor, Dorset

=== M ===
- Marazion Marsh, Cornwall
- Marshside, Merseyside
- Middleton Lakes, Warwickshire/ Staffordshire
- Minsmere, Suffolk
- Morecambe Bay, Lancashire

=== N ===
- Nagshead, Parkend, Gloucestershire
- Nene Washes, Cambridgeshire
- Nor Marsh and Motney Hill, Kent
- Northward Hill, Kent
- North Warren, Suffolk

=== O ===
- Dearne Valley Old Moor, South Yorkshire
- Otmoor, Oxfordshire
- Ouse Washes, Cambridgeshire

=== P ===
- Pagham Harbour, West Sussex
- Pulborough Brooks, West Sussex

=== R ===
- Radipole Lake, Dorset
- Rainham Marshes, Essex/ Greater London
- Rye Meads, Hertfordshire

=== S ===
- Saltholme, County Durham
- Sandwell Valley, West Midlands
- Sherwood Forest, Nottinghamshire
- Snettisham, Norfolk
- South Essex Marshes, Essex
- St Bees Head, Cumbria
- Stour Estuary, Essex
- Strumpshaw Fen, Norfolk
- Surlingham Church Marsh, Surlingham, Norfolk
- Swell Wood, part of the Fivehead Woods and Meadow SSSI, Somerset

=== T ===
- Titchwell Marsh, Hunstanton, Norfolk
- Tudeley Woods, Kent

=== W ===
- West Sedgemoor, Somerset
- Wolves Wood, Suffolk

== Northern Ireland ==
=== B ===
- Belfast Lough, Belfast

=== L ===
- Lough Foyle, County Londonderry
- Lower Lough Erne Islands, County Fermanagh

=== P ===
- Portmore Lough, County Antrim

=== R ===
- Rathlin Island Cliffs, County Antrim

== Scotland ==
=== A ===
- Ailsa Craig, South Ayrshire

=== B ===
- Balranald, North Uist
- Baron's Haugh, North Lanarkshire
- Birsay Moors, Orkney
- Brodgar, Orkney

=== C ===
- Coll, Argyll and Bute
- Copinsay, Orkney
- Corrimony, Highland
- Cottascarth and Rendall Moss, Orkney
- Culbin Sands, Highland

=== D ===
- Dunnet Head, Caithness

=== F ===
- Fairy Glen, Highland
- Fetlar, Shetland
- Forsinard, Sutherland, Highland
- Fowlsheugh, Aberdeenshire

=== G ===
- Glenborrodale, Highland

=== H ===
- Hobbister, Orkney
- Hoy, Orkney

=== I ===
- Insh Marshes, Badenoch and Strathspey, Highland
- Inversnaid

=== K ===
- Ken-Dee Marshes, Dumfries and Galloway

=== L ===
- Loch Garten Osprey Centre, Badenoch and Strathspey, Highland
- Loch Gruinart, Argyll and Bute
- Loch Lomond.
- Loch of Kinnordy, Angus
- Loch Ruthven, Highland
- Loch of Spiggie, Shetland
- Loch Strathbeg, Aberdeenshire
- Lochwinnoch, Renfrewshire
- The Loons and Loch of Banks, Orkney

=== M ===
- Marwick Head, Orkney
- Mersehead, Dumfries and Galloway
- Mill Dam, Orkney
- Mousa, Shetland
- Mull of Galloway, Dumfries and Galloway

=== N ===
- Nigg Bay, Highland
- North Hill, Orkney
- Noup Cliffs, Orkney

=== O ===
- The Oa, Argyll and Bute
- Onziebust, Orkney

=== S ===
- Sumburgh Head, Shetland

=== T ===
- Trumland, Orkney

=== U ===
- Udale Bay, Highland

=== V ===
- Vane Farm, Perth and Kinross

=== W ===
- Wood of Cree, Dumfries and Galloway

== Wales ==
=== C ===
- Carngafallt
- Conwy
- Cwm Clydach

=== G ===
- Grassholm
- Gwenffrwd & Dinas, Carmarthenshire

=== M ===
- Malltraeth
- Mawddach Valley

=== N ===
- Newport Wetlands Reserve

=== P ===
- Point of Ayr, Flintshire

=== R ===
- Ramsey Island

=== S ===
- South Stack, Anglesey

=== V ===
- Valley Wetlands, Anglesey
- Lake Vyrnwy, Powys

=== Y ===
- Ynys-hir
