= Mid-Yare National Nature Reserve =

Nature reserve in Norfolk, England

Coordinates: 52.593°N 1.473°E

Mid-Yare NNR is a national nature reserve in Norfolk, east of Norwich, established by English Nature and managed by the Royal Society for the Protection of Birds (RSPB). The reserve is made up of four RSPB reserves: Strumpshaw Fen, Buckenham Marshes and Cantley Marshes on the north bank of the Yare, and Surlingham Church Marsh on the south bank.

The reserve consists of floodplains along the River Yare, and the total area is 7.8 km^{2}. It centres on the Strumpshaw area.

The alder carr and willow carr support the swallowtail butterfly and the Norfolk hawker dragonfly Aeshna isosceles, as well as marsh harriers, bearded tits and Cetti's warblers.

The wet grasslands hold internationally important numbers of Eurasian wigeon, nationally important numbers of European white-fronted goose, and Britain's largest flock of bean goose, as well as northern lapwing, common redshank and common snipe.

The RSPB controls the water levels, maintains the dykes, cuts the reed beds and keeps disturbance of the wildlife to a minimum.
