= Cantley, Norfolk =

Village in England

Coordinates: 52.578°N 1.513°E

Cantley
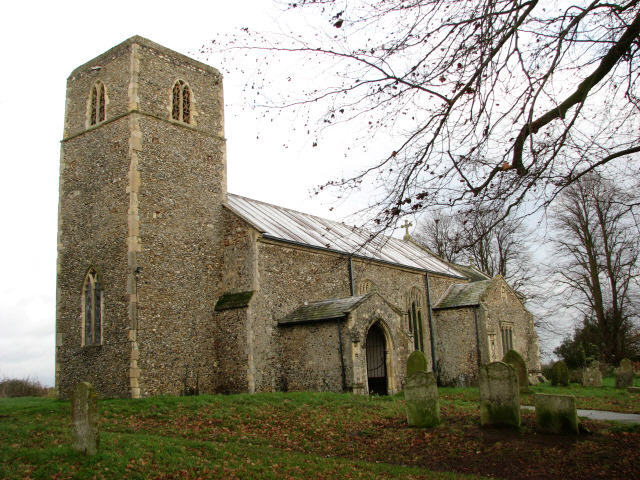
- St Margaret's Church

- Location within Norfolk
- Area: 0.52 km^{2} (0.20 sq mi)
- Population: 511 (2021)
  - Density: 983/km^{2} (2,550/sq mi)
- OS grid reference: TG381036
- Civil parish: Cantley, Limpenhoe and Southwood
- District: Broadland
- Shire county: Norfolk
- Region: East
- Country: England
- Sovereign state: United Kingdom
- Post town: NORWICH
- Postcode district: NR13
- Dialling code: 01493
- Police: Norfolk
- Fire: Norfolk
- Ambulance: East of England
- UK Parliament: Broadland and Fakenham

Cantley is a village in the civil parish of Cantley, Limpenhoe and Southwood, in the Broadland district, in the English county of Norfolk. It is 2 1/2 miles (4.0 km) north-west of Reedham, 9 miles (14 km) west of Great Yarmouth and 10 miles (16 km) south-east of Norwich. It is notable for being the site of a major sugar refining factory.

The village is on the north bank of the River Yare and is partly within the Broads Special Protection Area. Cantley Marshes, a Site of Special Scientific Interest managed by the Royal Society for the Protection of Birds is south-west of the village.

== History ==
In the Domesday Book of 1086, Cantley is recorded as a settlement of 58 households located in the hundred of Blofield. It was part of the estates of William the Conqueror.

The manor was later split to created Cantley Netherhall and Cantley Uphall.

On 1 April 1935 the parish absorbed Limpenhoe and Southwood, on 12 May 2016 the merged parish was renamed to "Cantley, Limpenhoe and Southwood". In 1931 the parish of Cantley (prior to the merge) had a population of 291.

== Cantley Sugar Factory ==
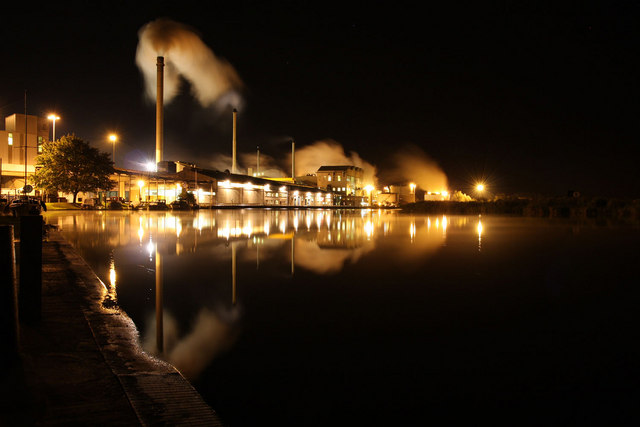
Cantley Sugar Beet Factory

In 1912 the Cantley Sugar Factory was founded by the Dutch company Algemene Suikermaatschappij (ASMij). ASMij had been founded in 1908 to concentrate the Dutch beet sugar industry and remove surplus capacity. To achieve this, it also bought the already closed down Dordrecht Sugar Factory. The machinery of this factory was then shipped to England to become part of Cantley Sugar Factory.

The factory was initially unsuccessful and closed down in 1916. After the English Beet Sugar Corporation was founded, Cantley Sugar Factory was reopened in 1920. The site is still in operation today by British Sugar, forming one of the four British sugar processing factories.

== Amenities ==
Local children attend Cantley Primary School and is part of the Coastal Together Federation of local primary schools.

The village is served by Cantley railway station which opened in 1844 on the Yarmouth and Norwich Railway. Today, the station lies on the Wherry Line with services to Great Yarmouth, Lowestoft and Norwich.

== St Margaret's Church ==
Cantley's parish church is dedicated to Saint Margaret and dates from the 14th century. The building is Grade II. The church was significantly remodelled in the 19th century.

Within the churchyard are two listed monuments, including a tombstone with a stone coffin lid and a further coffin lid emblazoned with fleur-de-lys.

== Notable people ==
- Edward B. Evans (1846–1922), army officer and stamp collector, died in Cantley
- Fred Judd (1914–1992), inventor and amateur radio enthusiast, lived in Cantley
- Brian Edrich (1922–2009), Kent and Glamorgan cricketer, born in Cantley
- Alfie Hewett (b.1997), wheelchair tennis player, lived in Cantley
