= Hassingham =

Village in Norfolk, England

Coordinates: 52.595456°N 1.496466°E

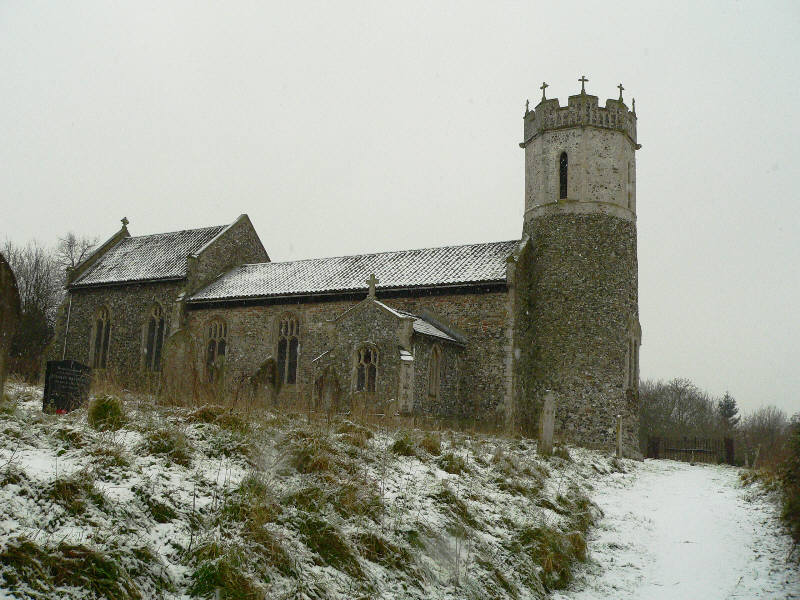
- St. Mary's Church

- Location within Norfolk
- OS grid reference: TG369054
- Civil parish: Strumpshaw
- District: Broadland
- Shire county: Norfolk
- Region: East
- Country: England
- Sovereign state: United Kingdom
- Post town: Norwich
- Postcode district: NR13
- Dialling code: 01603
- UK Parliament: Broadland and Fakenham

Hassingham is a village in the civil parish of Strumpshaw, in the Broadland district, in the English county of Norfolk.

Hassingham is located 3.6 miles (5.8 km) south-west of Acle and 8.9 miles (14.3 km) east of Norwich.

== History ==
Hassingham's name is of Anglo-Saxon origin and derives from the Old English for the homestead of Hasu's people.

In the Domesday Book, Hassingham is listed as a settlement of 11 households hundred of Blofield. In 1086, the village was part of the East Anglian estates of King William I.

On 1 April 1935 the parish was abolished and merged with Strumpshaw.

== Geography ==
In 1931 the parish had a population of 114, this was the last time population statistics were collected for Hassingham alone as in 1935, the parish was merged into Strumpshaw.

== St. Mary's Church ==
Hassingham's church is dedicated to Saint Mary and dates from the Twelfth Century. The church is located on Church Road and has been Grade II listed since 1962. The church still holds irregular church services and is part of the Lingwood Benefice.

St. Mary was restored in the Victorian era and again after a fire in 1971 but still retains medieval and Seventeenth Century stained-glass windows.

Its church, St Mary, is one of 124 existing round-tower churches in Norfolk. The best-known former incumbent of Hassingham is the Rev. William Haslam, a nineteenth-Century evangelical, better known as the Parson who was converted by his own sermon. Haslam held the living, together with that of nearby Buckenham from 1863 to 1871, having been presented to the living by Sir Thomas Proctor-Beauchamp of Langley Hall. During Haslam's ministry in Hassingham, it was said that most of the population of this small village professed evangelical conversion. Haslam was supported by his wife and the preacher Geraldine Hooper whom they had met in Bath.

There are records of potential hauntings of St. Mary's Church as in the Twentieth Century, a family heard organ music coming from the church and opened the door to find it empty.

== Governance ==
Hassingham is part of the electoral ward of Brundall for local elections and is part of the district of Broadland.

The village's national constituency is Broadland and Fakenham which has been represented by the Conservative Party's Jerome Mayhew MP since 2019.

== War Memorial ==
Hassingham has no war memorial for the First World War, though the following men from Hassingham died during the conflict:

Rank	Name	Unit	Date of death	Burial/Commemoration
Pte.	Frank C. Turner	7th Bn., Bedfordshire Regiment	20 Oct. 1917	Tyne Cot
Pte.	Herbert H. Curtis	1st Bn., Norfolk Regiment	23 Apr. 1917	Arras Memorial
Pte.	Thomas F. Dawson	8th Bn., Norfolk Regt.	19 Jul. 1916	Thiepval Memorial
