= Northward =

Northward may refer to:

- The cardinal direction North
- Northward, Isles of Scilly, part of Old Grimsby, England
- Northward (band), a band composed of vocalist Floor Jansen and guitarist Jørn Viggo Lofstad
- HMT Northward, a requisitioned trawler of the Royal Navy during World War II

== See also ==
- North (disambiguation)
- Northward equinox, the equinox when Earth's subsolar point appears to leave the Southern Hemisphere
- Northward Hill, a nature reserve in Britain
- Northward Ho, an early Jacobean stage play
