= Cantley Marshes =

UK Site of Special Scientific Interest

Coordinates: 52.582°N 1.497°E

- Site of Special Scientific Interest
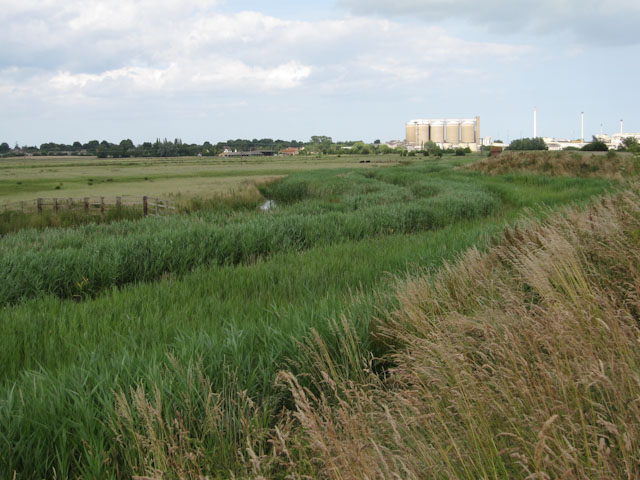
- Location of Cantley Marshes.
- Area of search: Norfolk
- Grid reference: TG 370 040
- Interest: Biological
- Area: 272.1 hectares (672 acres)
- Notification date: 1997
- Location map: Magic Map

Cantley Marshes is a 272.1-hectare (672-acre) biological Site of Special Scientific Interest south-east of Norwich in Norfolk, England. It is managed by the Royal Society for the Protection of Birds, It is part of the Broadland Ramsar site and Special Protection Area, The Broads Special Area of Conservation and the Mid-Yare National Nature Reserve. It is located southwest of the village of Cantley.

This protected area is adjacent to another protected area called Yare Broads and Marshes SSSI, and so is part of a wider area of protection.

This site in the Yare valley is mainly species-rich grazing marsh with areas of wet alder carr and tall herb fen along the river bank. Invertebrates include two nationally rare dragonflies, and the marshes have several important breeding bird species and an internationally important population of wintering wigeon.

The dykes in this protected area support a diversity of aquatic plants including sharp-leaved pondweed, whorled water milfoil, greater water parsnip, hairlike pondweed, blunt leaved pondweed, lesser water plantain, flat-stalked pondweed, soft hornwort and floating clubrush. In the fen near the River Yare, the plant marsh sowthistle is also found.

Dragonfly species recorded in this protected area include the norfolk hawker and the scarce chaser.
