= Nagshead =

Woodland reserve in Gloucestershire

RSPB Nagshead
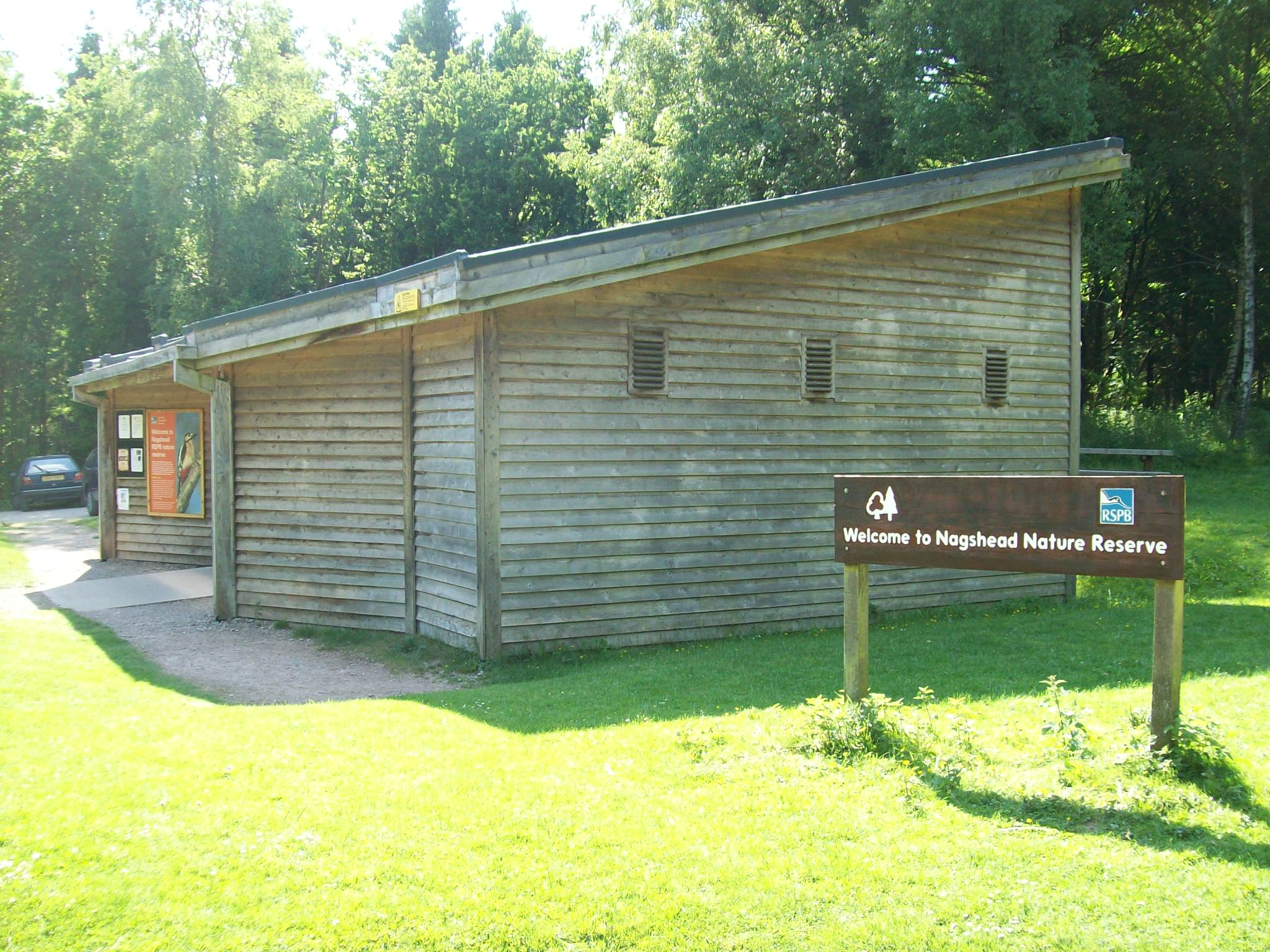
- Visitor centre

- Location within Gloucestershire
- Type: RSPB Reserve
- Location: Parkend, Forest of Dean, Gloucestershire, UK
- Coordinates: 51°46′05″N 2°33′56″W
- Area: 1,250 acres (510 ha)
- Operator: RSPB and Forestry England
- Status: Open all year

Nagshead is a woodland reserve, located on the western edge of Parkend, in the Forest of Dean, Gloucestershire, and is home to RSPB Nagshead. The site is listed in the 'Forest of Dean Local Plan Review'.

More than half of the reserve consists of 19th-century oak woodland, which is now managed solely for its conservation and landscape value.

In 1942, nest boxes were erected at Nagshead, in the hope that pied flycatchers would control oak leafroller moth larva, which were defoliating trees needed for the war effort. In 1948, the ornithologist, Bruce Campbell, began recording detailed observations of the boxes and they have been continually monitored ever since; making it the UK's longest-running bird breeding programme. Nagshead includes a biological Site of Special Scientific Interest (SSSI).

== Facilities ==
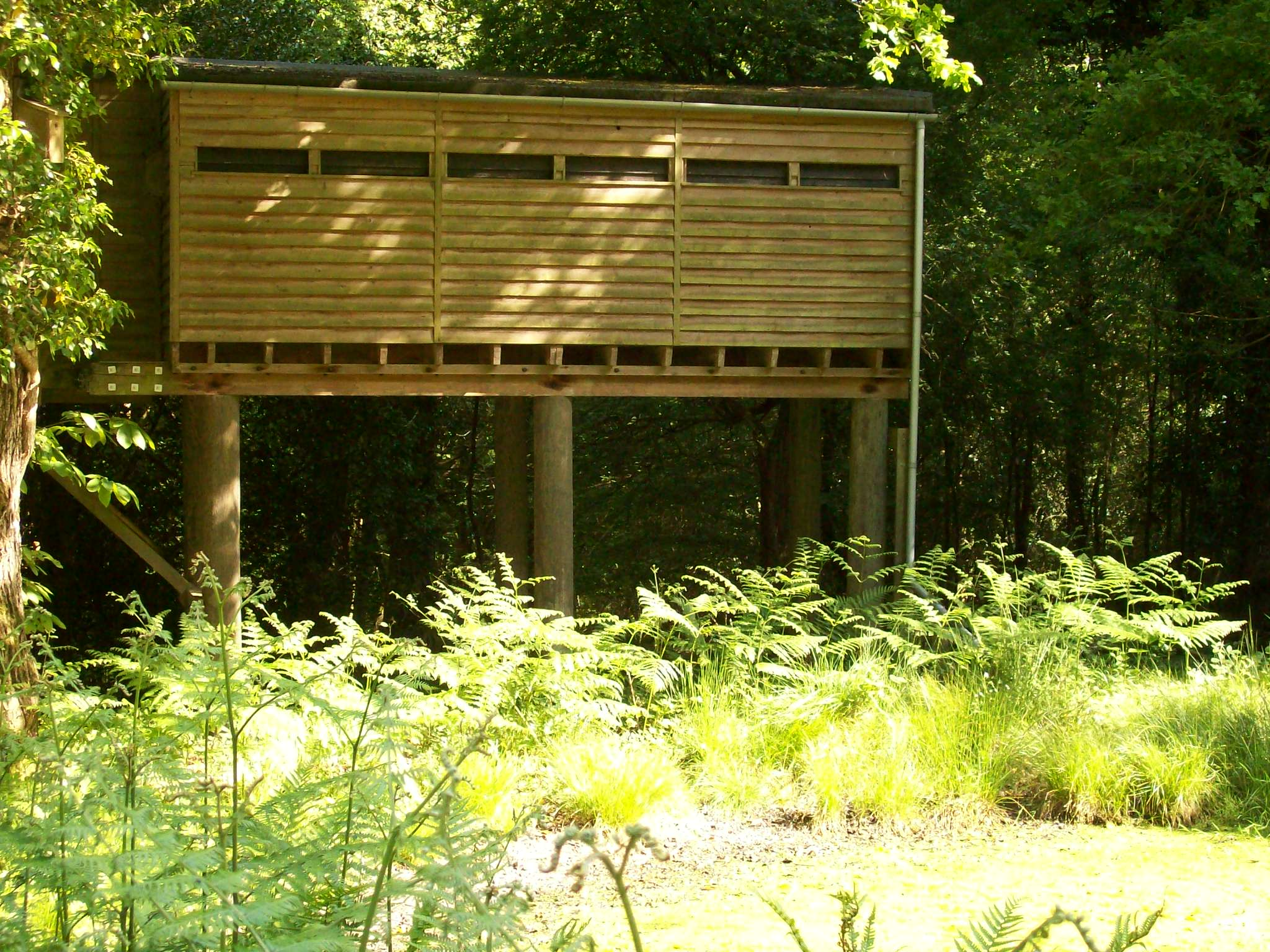
Campbell Hide

The reserve is open all year. Entrance and car parking are free.

Facilities include;

- Visitor centre and toilets (open at weekends during the summer).
- Large car park.
- Two viewing hides.
- Two way-marked walks (1 mile and 2.25 miles).
- Picnic area.
- Information boards.

== Flora and Fauna ==
=== Birds ===
Birdlife in the reserve includes great spotted woodpecker, Eurasian nuthatch, northern goshawk and common buzzard. Breeding birds include common redstart, pied flycatcher, and common crossbill and wood warbler, some typical species of woodlands in the west of Britain. Redwing, hawfinch and Eurasian woodcock can be found in winter.

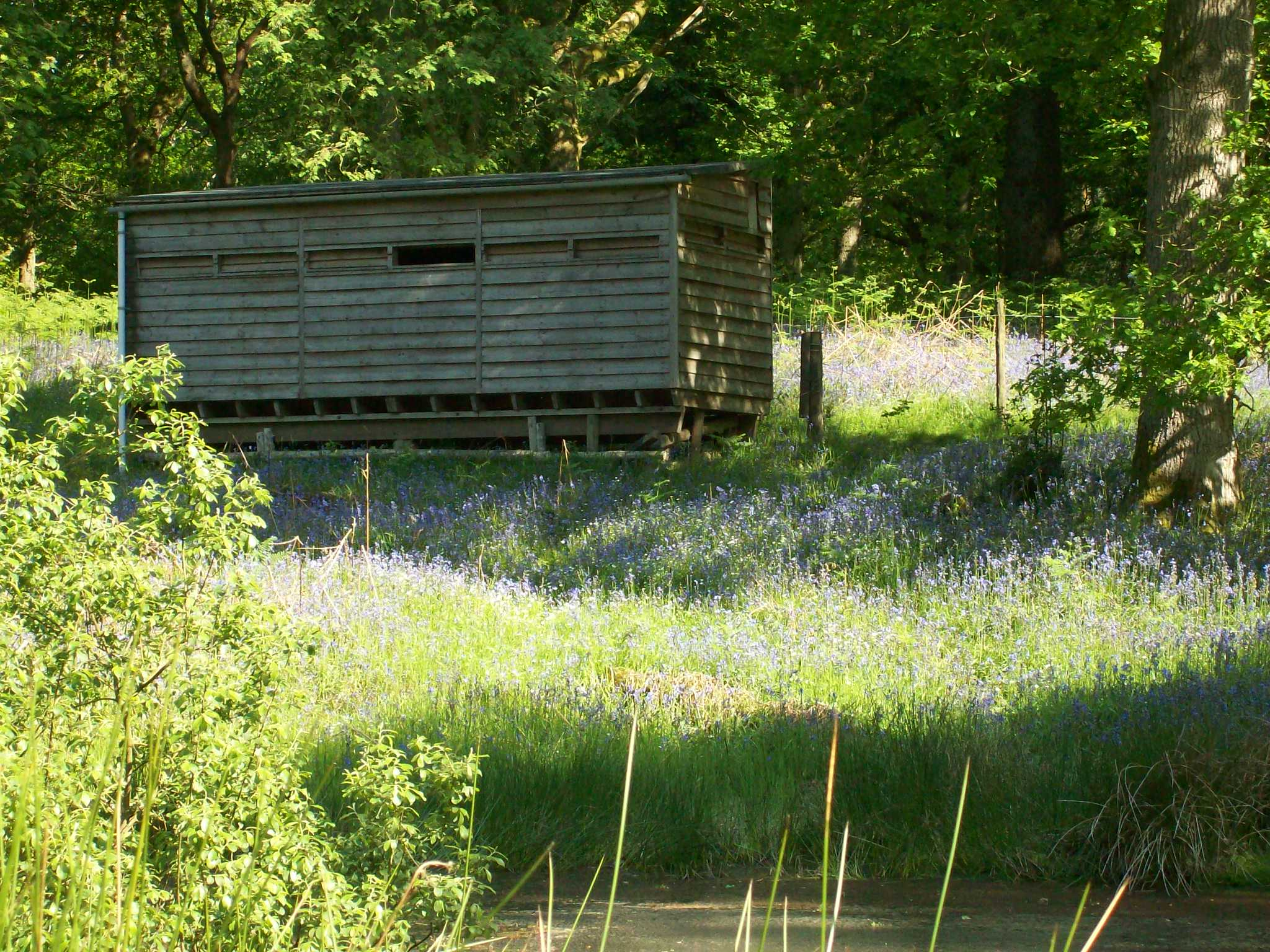
Lower Hide

=== Other wildlife ===
More than 30 different butterflies and 20 dragonflies and damselflies have been seen at Nagshead. 8 of Britain's 12 reptiles and amphibians breed here; common lizard, slowworm, adder, grass snake, common frog, common toad, smooth newt and palmate newt.

Wild boar also roam Nagshead, but these are rarely seen.

== Nagshead SSSI ==
A relatively small area of Nagshead reserve is designated a biological Site of Special Scientific Interest. This comprises 120.12 hectares and lies adjacent to the Nagshead Plantation, with the B4234 running through the middle of it. It is in the region of Nagshead Hill, Cleave Hill and Fetter Hill.

== Bibliography ==
RSPB Nagshead Trail Guide (leaflet)
