= West of Walney =

Coordinates: 54.044000°N 3.522000°W

West of Walney is a Marine Conservation Zone in the Irish Sea west of Walney Island, England. It was designated in 2016 to protect subtidal mud and sand habitats: at that time the MCZ was one of three off the coast of Cumbria, the others being Allonby Bay and Cumbria Coast. The area is 388km2, a similar size to the Isle of Wight off the south coast of England. The depth range of the site is 15–33 metres.

An unusual feature of the MCZ is that it is co-located with offshore wind turbines. At the time of designation it was noted that it would be simpler to restrict fishing by bottom trawling because this type of fishing is generally discouraged within windfarm developments. In 2019 a bye-law prohibited bottom trawling from the majority of the site. Sustainable fishing for prawns using creels has been trialled.

== Fauna ==
Fauna of interest include sea pens.

== See also ==
The waters west of Walney Island have some of the largest offshore wind farms in the world.

Name	Number of Turbines	Capacity (MW)	Construction Began	Operation Began
Barrow Offshore Wind Farm	30	90	2004	2006
Ormonde Wind Farm	30	150	2010	2011
Walney Wind Farm 1	51	184	2010	2011
Walney Wind Farm 2	51	183.6	2011	2011
West of Duddon Sands Wind Farm	108	389	2013	2014
Walney Extension Wind Farm	108	660	2017	
