= Fairy Glen (RSPB reserve) =

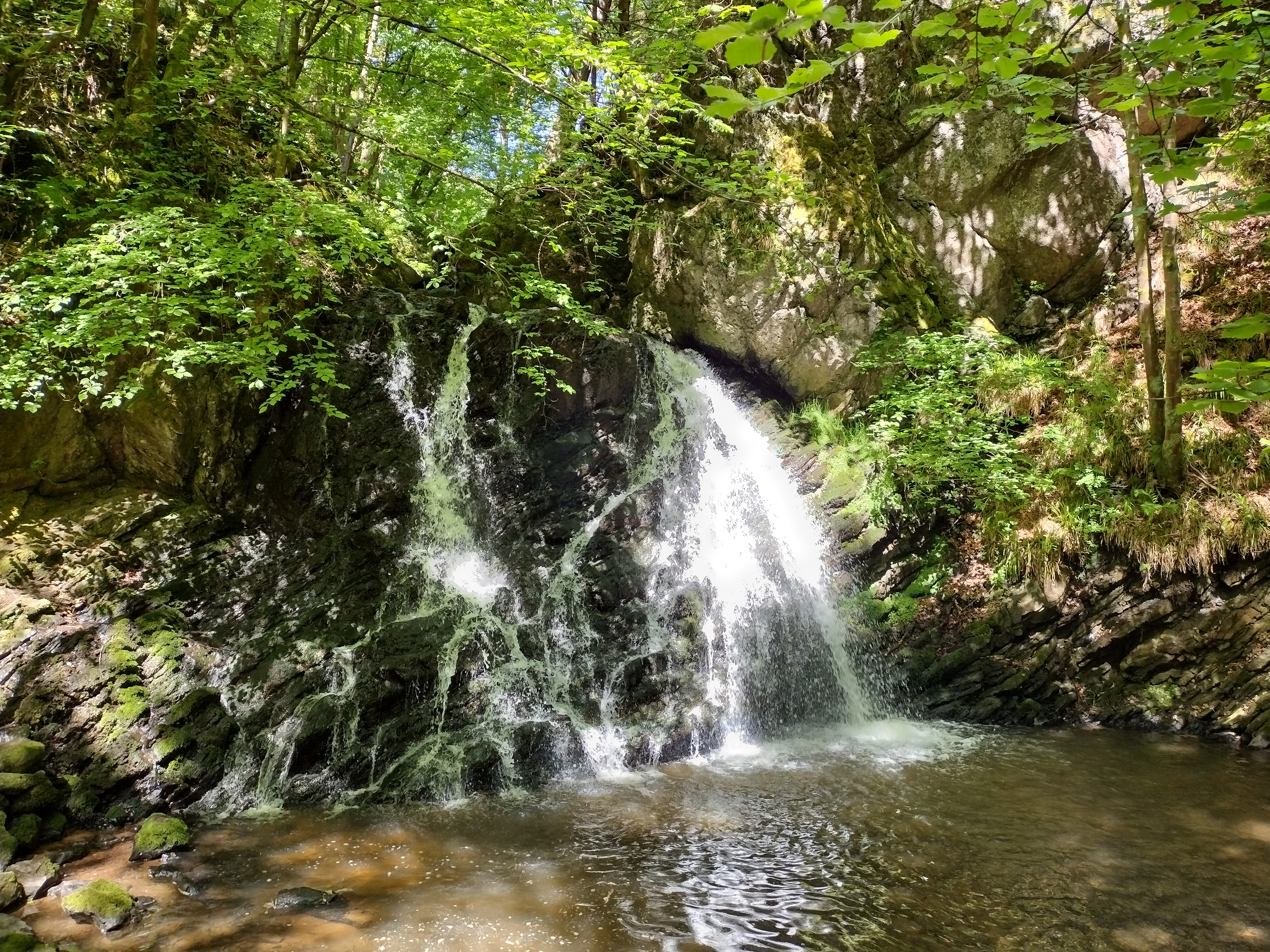
- Lower waterfall

- Location within Scotland
- Type: Nature reserve
- Location: Rosemarkie (Higland, Scotland)
- Coordinates: 57.5936960°N 4.1246066°W
- Operator: RSPB

Designations

Inventory of Gardens and Designed Landscapes in Scotland
- Official name: The Fairy Glen
- Designated: 30 March 2003
- Reference no.: GDL00357

Fairy Glen is a protected area in the Highland, Scotland.

== Features ==
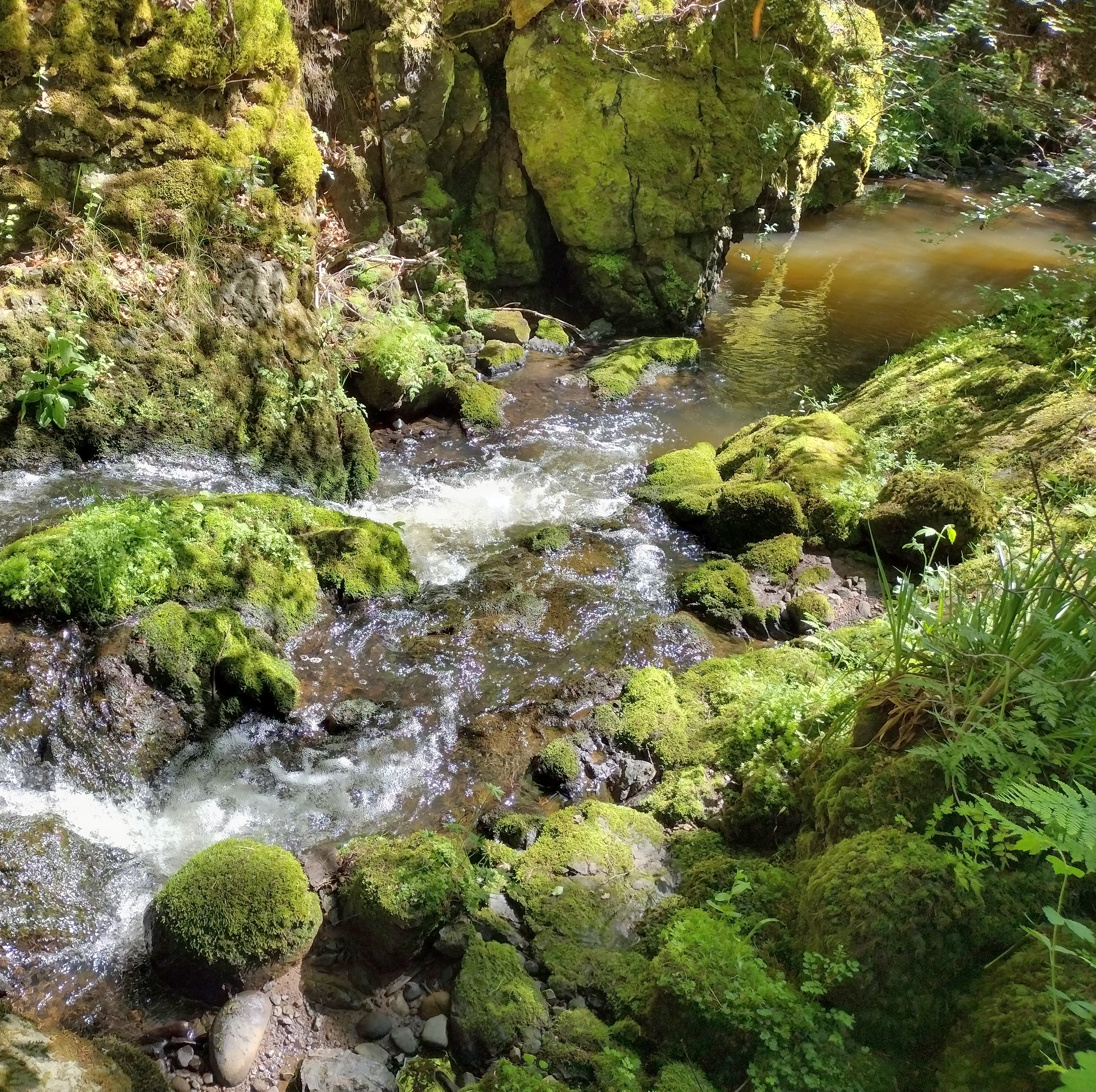
Markie Burn

The reserve protects a belt of semi-natural woodland, with predominating broad-leaved trees, stretching at both sides of the Markie Burn, a stream tributary of the Moray Firth. The valley is narrow and steep-sided, and supports a variety of plants and local birds. The wood management usually operates on non intervention basis, besides removal of invasive species and, when necessary, some tree safety interventions.

== Wildlife ==
Among the birds living in the nature reserve are:

- Spotted flycatcher
- Long-tailed tit
- Bullfinch
- Buzzards
- Song thrush

== Folklore ==
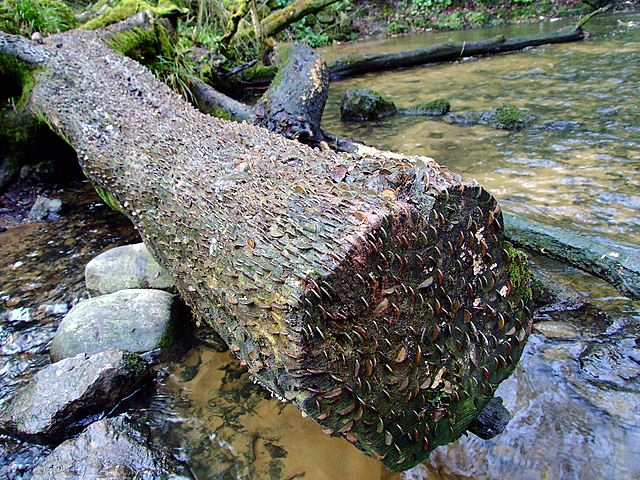
One of the Money trees

The Glen is connected to some ancient costoms. Children of nearby villages used to cast flowers petals in the burn, in order to encourage the fairies to provide fresh water to their hamlets. A peculiar sight in the Fairy Glen are some old logs known as Money trees, bearing hundreds of coins hammered into their wood, traditionally considered gifts to the fairies. Nowadays the management of the nature reserve discourages this habit, because of the pollution produced by metal corrosion and oxidation.

== Access ==
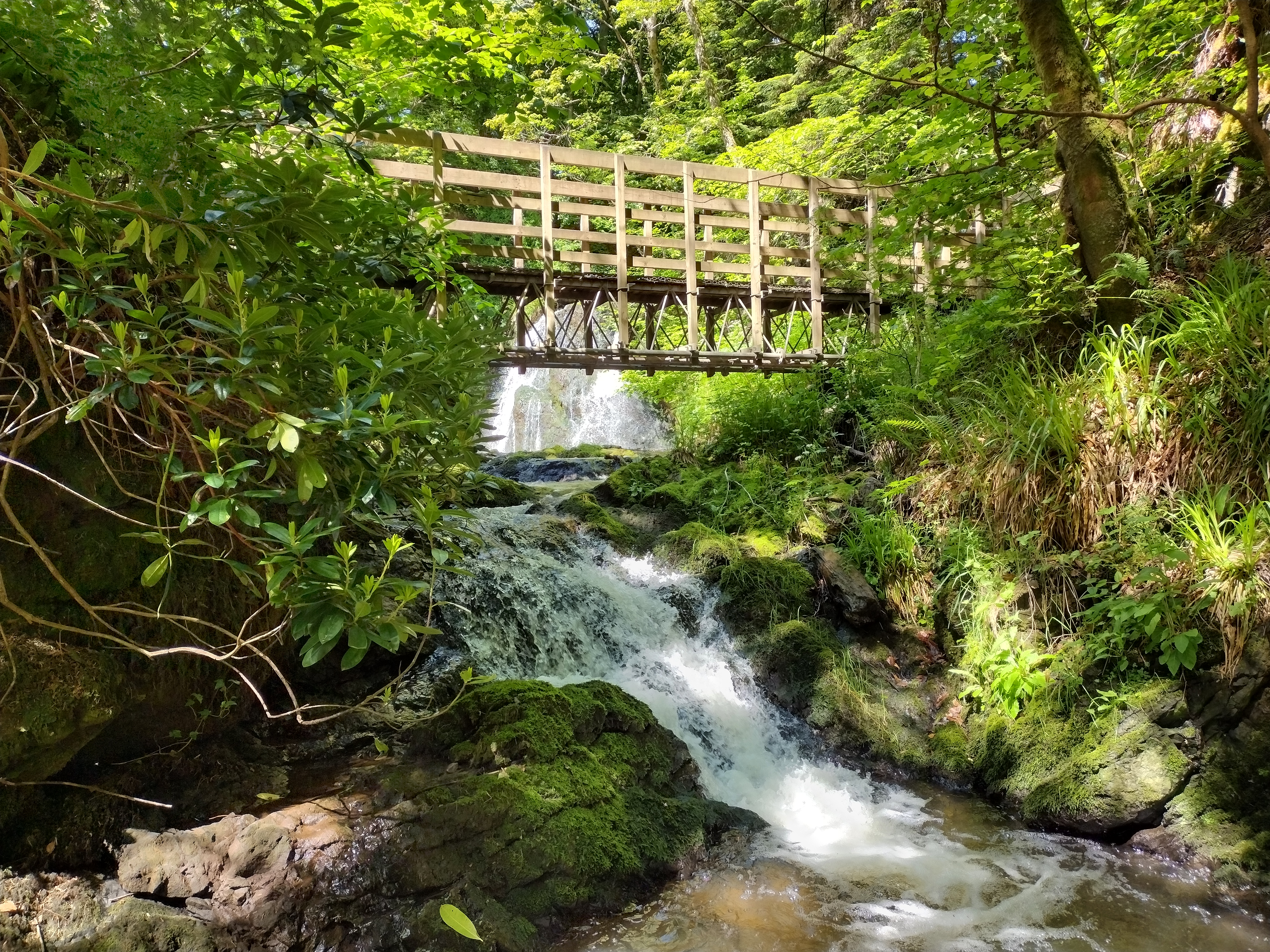
Pedestrian bridge close to the upper waterfall

A footpath follows the small river from its mouth in Rosemarkie beach flanking two pleasant waterfalls and, after the uppermost of them, ends up in a tiny road which runs on the left side of the glen. A car park is available close to the beginning of the walk. Some part of the footpath are steep and can become slippery with rainy weather; dogs can access the walk but have to be conducted on short leads from April to August, because of the disturbance they can cause to wildlife.

== See also ==
- List of RSPB reserves
