= Dordrecht Sugar Factory =

Defunct sugar factory

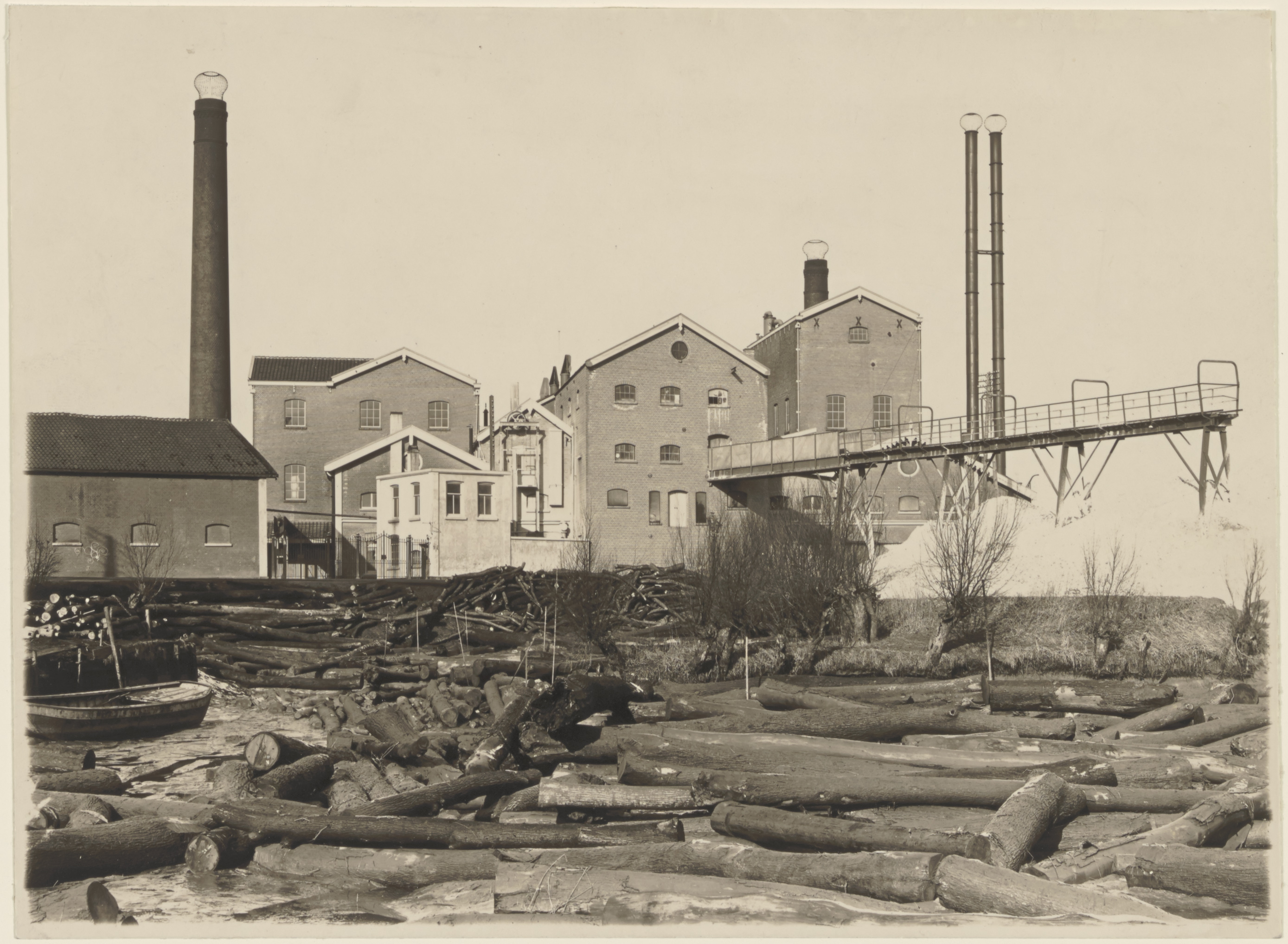
- Dordrecht Sugar Factory in c. 1901

- Location within Netherlands
- Built: c. 1861
- Location: 's Gravendeelsche Dijk, Dordrecht, Netherlands
- Coordinates: 51°48′31″N 4°39′01″E
- Products: white sugar
- Owner: Algemene Suikermaatschappij (last)
- Defunct: 1912

Dordrecht Sugar Factory was an early Dutch beet sugar factory, built in 1861. It closed down in 1909 and has since been completely demolished.

== The Dutch sugar industry in the early 19th century ==
Dordrecht had traditionally been the third Dutch center for refining sugar from sugar cane, after Amsterdam and Rotterdam. During the French period the Dordrecht sugar refineries were forced to try their hand at refining sugar from sugar beet in 1812. After Dordrecht was liberated they stopped these attempts and again turned to refining raw sugar from cane. In the Netherlands, only the Oorsprong Sugar Factory in Oosterbeek continued to produce some sugar from beet.

The sugar refining industry of the Netherlands was subsidized by taxing the export of raw sugar from Java to other destinations. However, by the mid-19th century, the Netherlands Trading Society began to liberalize the export of raw sugar from Java. This made that the Dutch sugar refineries had to compete for this sugar with the British ones. It made the option to produce sugar from beet interesting again. In 1858, the brothers De Bruyn, affiliated with the Nederlandsche Suikerraffinaderij then founded the first modern beet sugar factory of the Netherlands in Zevenbergen.

== N.V. Dordrechtsche Maatschappij van Beetwortelsuiker ==
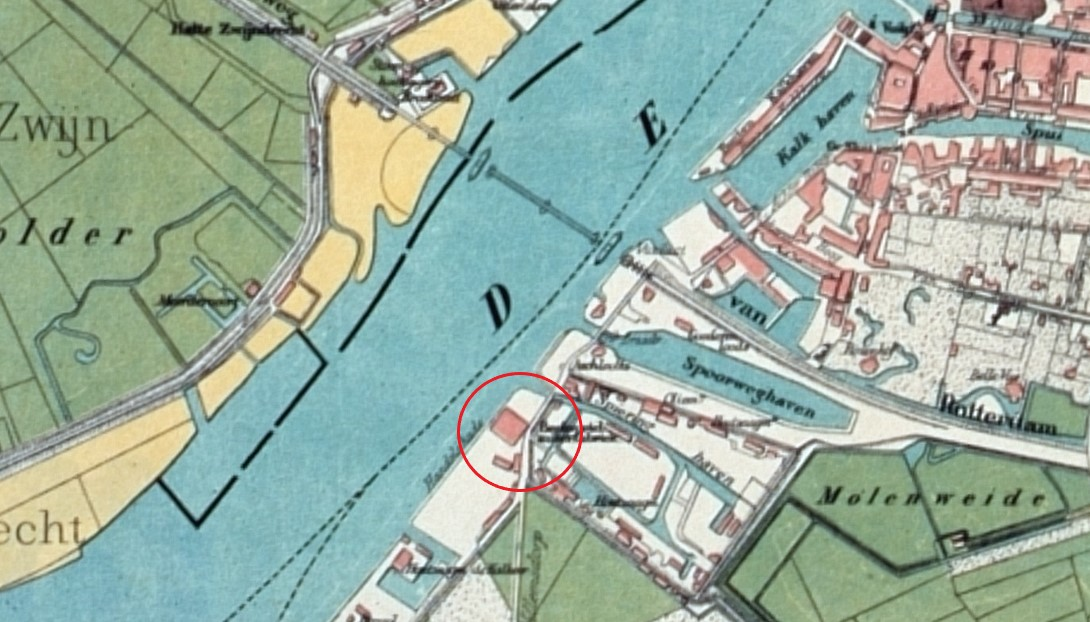
Location on 1894 map

On 12 April 1861 the N.V. Dordrechtsche Maatschappij van Beetwortelsuiker, literally "The public company Dordrecht Society for beet sugar" was founded. It would have a share capital of 144,000 guilders, split in 24 shares of 6,000 guilders. The first shareholders were:

- Jan van Haaften, contractor: 2 shares
- Otto Boudewijn de Kat, kassier: 2 shares
- Adrianus van Haaften, land owner: 2 shares
- Johannes Frederik Kolkman, merchant: 2 shares
- Wouter Marinus van Haaften, land owner: 2 shares
- Herman Adriaan van den Wall Bake (1809-1874), national mint master: 2 shares
- Pieter Blussé van Oud-Alblas (1812-1887), shipping line owner and merchant: 2 shares
- Paulus Roelof van der Made, engineer: 2 shares
- Arie Adriaan Visser Korstiaanszoon, land owner 1 share
- Adolphe Blussé, shipping line owner and merchant: 1 share
- Samuel Crena de Jongh, merchant and land owner: 1 share
- Hendrik Holle, land owner: 1 share
- Adrianus Walraven Fisler, land owner: 1 share
- Leendert van Haaften, preacher and land owner: 1 share
- Gerardus 't Hooft, kassier: 1 share
- Hendrika Petronella Blussé, widow of H.P. Visser: 1 share

Paulus Roelof van der Made was appointed as first director. The supervisory board was formed by Jan van Haaften, Otto Boudewijn de Kat, Adrianus van Haaften, Johannes Frederik Kolkman, Wouter Marinus van Haaften, Herman Adriaan van den Wall Bake, mr. Adoplhe Blussé, and Arie Adriaan Visser Korstiaanszoon.

=== The factory is built ===
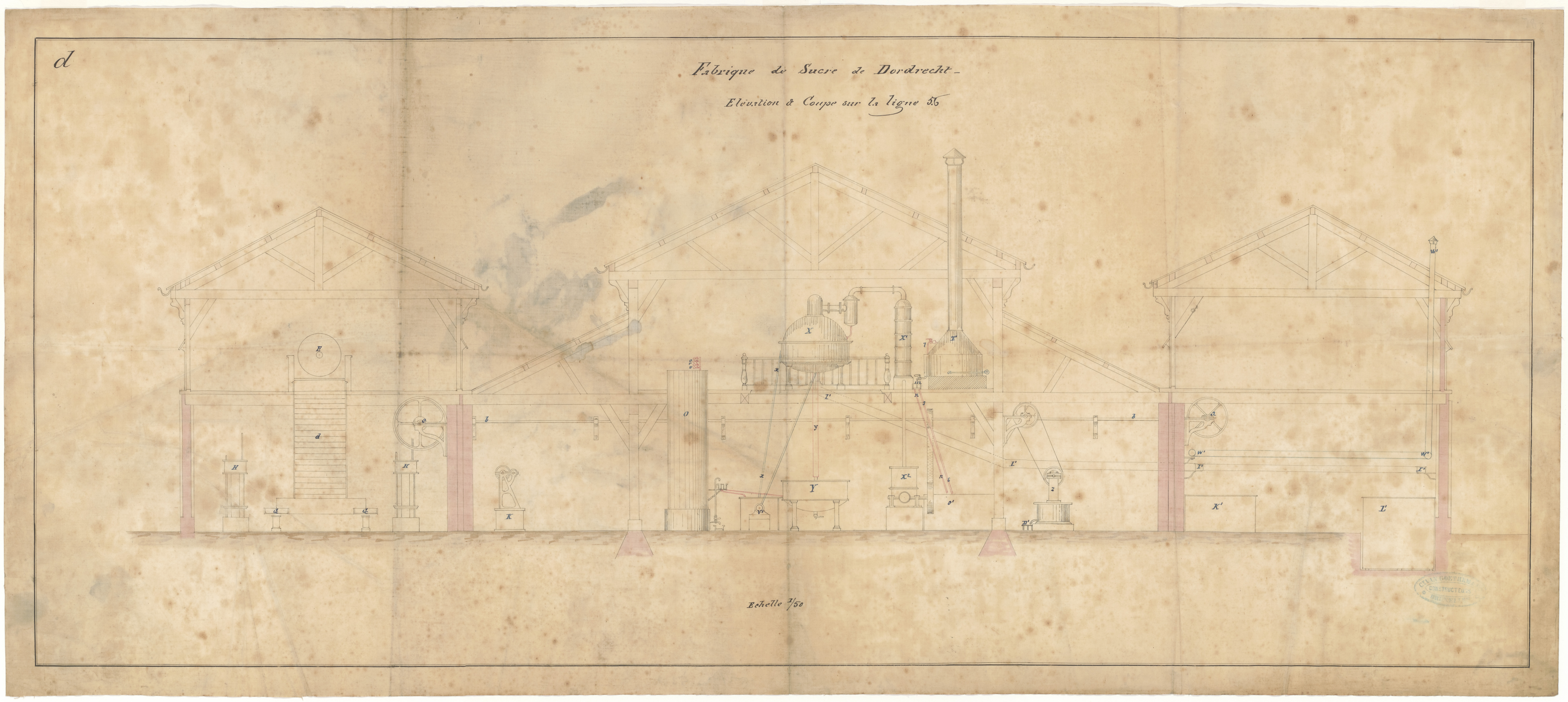
Design overview of Dordrecht Sugar factory

The first 10 of the list of shareholders brought into the company:

- The buildings, machinery and tools of the factory of the Maatschappij tot verbeterde vlasbereiding in Nederland. This was a flax processing factory in Dubbeldam. Dubbeldam is now part of Dordrecht, but was then an independent municipality.
- The octagonal wind sawmill "De nieuwe Eendragt" on Bakstraat in Dordrecht with its houses, warehouses etc.

The factory had been bought for 33,479 guilders on 30 May 1860. The wind sawmill had been bought on 30 October 1860 for 11,219 guilders.

The terrain of the former flax factory was in a suitable location, as it was on the Oude Maas. A location on navigable water was very important for the supply of sugar beet. For these, the only transport options over longer distances were by water or by rail. However, in the Netherlands, the network of navigable waterways was more finely grained. The location on the Oude Maas was also good for supplying coal to the factory, which could come by ship from the United Kingdom, or by boat from the Rhine. Anyway, lower transport cost for coal substantially lowered the operational cost of the factory. The water of the Oude Maas was furthermore important in the production process itself.

A house that had belonged to the old wind sawmill would house the offices of the company. The sawmill itself and some other buildings belonging to it were rented out to others.

Already in June 1860, the founders had appointed a commission to establish the factory. This consisted of P.R. van der Made, A. van Haaftem, and J.F. Kolkman. The commission first contacted Paul van Vlissingen of Van Vlissingen en Dudok van Heel. Van Vlissingen had agreed with De Bruyn, director of the Zevenaar Sugar Factory to show the commission that factory, but when the visitors arrived they were not admitted.

The commission then immediately contacted William van Goethem, a machine factory owner in Brussels. From 27 June till 3 July 1860, Van Goethem took the commission on a tour of nine sugar factories in Belgium and Northern France.

For construction the factory, Van Vlissingen made two offers, and Van Goethem one. All three offers were for an installation that could process at least 60 tonnes of beet per 24 hours. The calculations showed that the ration between cost and profit was far favorable at 60 tonnes than at 40 tonnes. Van Vlissingen then offered for 153,000 guilders, while Van Goethem offered for 114,000 guilders. Van Goethem got the order, also because he was much clearer in his offer. Van Goethem would also look for suitable staff, which would lead to quite some challenges.

Other works were building an annex for the revivication of bone char, and making a quay from basalt for the sugar beet boats. A series of design drawings showing the complex has been preserved in the Regionaal Archief Dordrecht

=== In Business ===
In official reports, it was reported that the Dordrecht Sugar Factory had begun to operate in 1861. During the campaign it employed 250 workers on average, it had 5 steam engines totalling 46 hp, and 4 boilers totaling 170 hp. The start seemed promising.

Already in 1863 it was clear that the sugar factory was not successful. Multiple causes were mentioned:

- The buildings were not suitable
- The management lacked the experience to plan the logistics of a sugar beet campaign
- The management did not have enough experience to manage such a large workforce
- The management lacked the technical skill and experience to ensure that the production process kept running.

=== Liquidation ===
The management was not able to make the Dordrecht Sugar Factory successful. It was probably aware of this problem and also of the fact they would become personally liable if they would continue to lose the money of the company. Therefore, the beet sugar factory was put up for auction in 1864.

== Adolphe Meeus & Co. (1864) ==
The Meeus brothers were Meeus active in Antwerp and surroundings as: sugar refiners, sugar distillers, and sugar manufacturers. They would acquire the factory and would later become owners of parts of the Werkendam Sugar Factory and the Standaardbuiten Sugar Factory.

On 2 and 9 April 1864 the sugar factory of the Dordrechtsche Maatschappij van Beetwortelsuiker was auctioned. On 2 April, there were offers of 65,000 guilders for the buildings, and of 2,400 guilders for the land of the sugar beet reception areas. The inventory and stock that the buyer would also have to buy was listed for 16,108.40 guilders. On 9 April Adolphe Meeus bought the whole for 80,000 guilders.

The factory now became part of Firma Adolphe Meeus & Co. Meeuse moved from Amsterdam to the Wijnstraat in Dordrecht.

Meeus would extend the site of the factory and invest in several improvements. In 1868 a steam engine of 8 hp, which moved a pump for carbon dioxide was placed. That year 7,000 t of beet were processed. In 1870 this was 10,000 t. As of 1880, the factory used diffusers to extract the juice from the sugar beet. In 1884 it got a sixth steam engine.

In 1885 Adolphe Meeus left for Belgium. He was succeeded by his sons Louis and August, who had been trained in the trade in Belgium.

== Dordrechtsche Suikerfabriek (1894) ==
=== Foundation ===
On 12 April 1894, the public company Dordrechtsche Suikerfabriek was founded. It had a share capital of 100 shares of 2,000 guilder each. Adolphe J.P.H. Meeus had 41 shares. Other shareholders were smaller. Adolph would pay for his shares by bringing in the sugar factory and annexes, so the move seemed aimed at bringing new equity into the company. Louis Meeus became the first director of the new company with a salary of 5,000 guilders a year.

=== The Bond van Beetwortelsuikerfabrikanten ===
In 1885 the Bond van Beetwortelsuikerfabrikanten (Union of Beet sugar manufacturers) had been founded. It tried to support prices by countering overproduction. In late 1898 it finally succeed in making a deal about quotas for the individual sugar factories. In 1907 the Union even succeeded in making a deal that would assign quotas for ten years. Only the Eerste Nederlandsche Coöperatieve Beetwortelsuikerfabriek did not join the agreement, which would indeed last till 1917.

Part of these deals was that some members skipped production during some campaigns. In 1902/3 and 1904/05 Dordrecht Sugar Factory did not produce sugar.

After 1906, the Dordrecht Chamber of Commerce no longer got any news of the factory. Louis Meeuse nevertheless asked for several permits. In 1907 he got one for demolishing the existing factory and constructing a completely new factory.

== Algemene Suikermaatschappij (ASMij) (1909) ==
The Algemene Suikermaatschappij (ASMij) was founded in 1908 by Paul Wittouck, J.P. van Rossum, and mr. A.J.M. Smits. The Wittouck family had the majority in Raffinerie Tirlemontoise, and now Paul got the majority in ASMij. The founders of ASMij saw mergers as a means to solve the overproduction on the sugar market. In 1909 ASMij bought the already closed Dordrecht Sugar Factory. One of the reasons that ASMij bought the closed down factory, was that it could use the production quota that the Bond van Beetwortelsuikerfabrikanten had assigned to the factory.

In 1912, the machinery of Dordrecht Sugar Factory was shipped to the United Kingdom. The machinery was then used as part of the Cantley beet sugar factory.
