= Nagshead SSSI =

Protected area in Gloucestershire, England

Nagshead
- Site of Special Scientific Interest
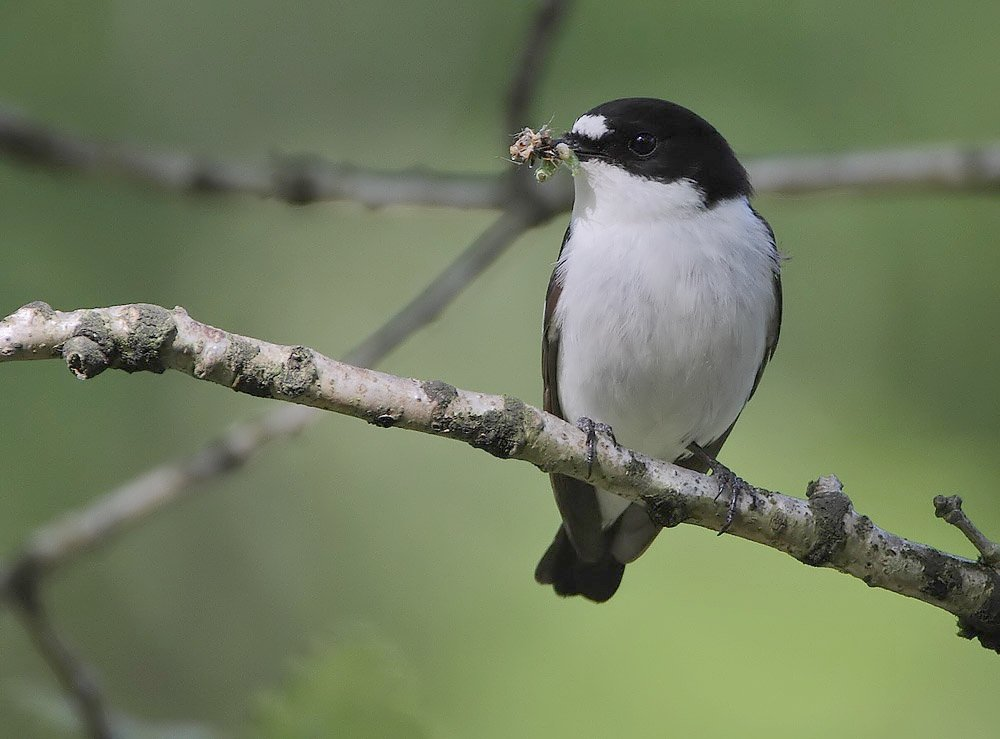
- Example: pied flycatcher - woodland supports good populations at Nagshead
- Location of Nagshead.
- Area of search: Gloucestershire
- Grid reference: SO608090
- Coordinates: 51.778738°N 2.568874°W
- Interest: Biological
- Area: 120.12 ha (296.8 acres)
- Notification date: 1972

Nagshead SSSI is a 297 acres (120 ha) biological Site of Special Scientific Interest located within RSPB Nagshead, near Parkend, in the Forest of Dean, Gloucestershire.

It was notified in 1972 and is listed in the 'Forest of Dean Local Plan Review' as a Key Wildlife Site.

The SSSI consists of two units of assessment by Natural England and occupies a relatively small area on the eastern side of the much larger 1,250 acres (510 ha) nature reserve, all of which is jointly managed by the RSPB and Forestry England.

== History ==
The woodland in the Forest of Dean has been managed for timber for a significant time. As a consequence there is a variety of woodland types as a result of the woodland management. The central area of woodland is in the Coal Measures and this area supports oak with restricted ground flora. This is an acidic area. Around it are the limestone and Old Red Sandstone rocks. These provide soils which are more fertile and a richer ground flora.

The Nagshead site is one of three sites in the Forest of Dean which are of national nature conservation importance. It is an excellent example of broad-leaved woodland and is of major ornithological importance. The oldest part of the site was planted in 1814 and includes pedunculate oak and sessile oak.

== Understorey ==
The ground flora of the understorey varies dependent upon whether the woodland is grazed by sheep. A dense shrub layer which is dominated by holly and rowan occurs in the ungrazed areas. Grazed areas are more open. Herb layers consists of bramble, bracken, softgrass and tufted hair grass. wood sorrel and bluebell are locally abundant.

== Ponds and streams ==
The Cannop Brook runs within the site and there are semi-natural area of woodland (mostly alder). The diversity of the habitat is enhanced by small ponds and streams and there are rarer plants reported such as heath spotted orchid and broad-leaved helleborine.

== Birdlife ==
This is an area which is rich in bird life and there are established populations of breeding pied flycatcher, wood warbler and common redstart. There has been long established research into the breeding biology of various birds at Nagshead and there is a nestbox scheme managed by the RSPB.

== Invertebrates ==
Butterflies are attracted by the open rides and recordings including white admiral, pearl-bordered fritillary and purple hairstreak. The Cannop Brook supports a good range of woodland invertebrates.

== Conservation ==
The unit reports for 2009 indicate the need for a watching brief on the presence of sweet chestnut and sycamore. Implications of the lack of grazing are noted and how this may affect the woodland structure necessary for some breeding birds.

== SSSI Source ==
- Natural England SSSI information on the citation
- Natural England SSSI information on the Nagshead units
