= Buckenham railway station =

Railway station in Norfolk, England

Coordinates: 52.59734°N 1.46852°E

Buckenham
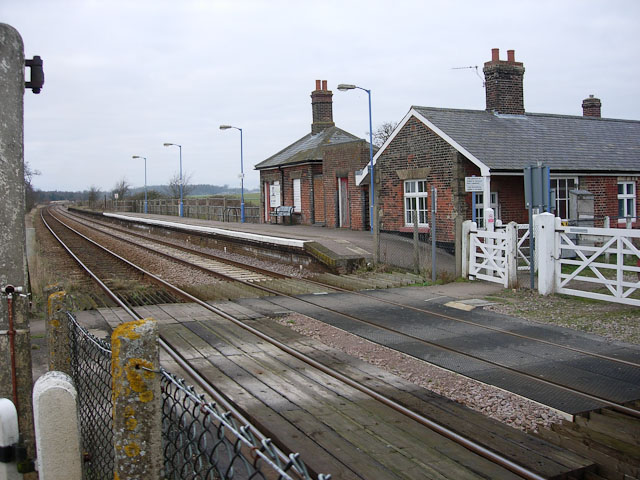

General information
- Location: Buckenham, Broadland, Norfolk; England
- Grid reference: TG350056
- Manager: Greater Anglia
- Platforms: 2

Other information
- Station code: BUC
- Classification: DfT category F2

History
- Original company: Yarmouth and Norwich Railway
- Pre-grouping: Great Eastern Railway
- Post-grouping: LNER

Key dates
- 1 May 1844: Opened

Passengers
- 2021/22: ▲300
- 2022/23: ▲354
- 2023/24: ▲360
- 2024/25: ▼284
- 2025/26: ▼274
Location
Notes
- Passenger statistics from the Office of Rail and Road

Buckenham railway station is a stop on the Wherry Lines, which serves the village of Buckenham in Norfolk, England. It is 7 miles 62 chains (12.5 km) down the line from Norwich on the routes to Lowestoft and Great Yarmouth; it is situated between Brundall and Cantley. It is managed by Greater Anglia, who operate all services at the station.

== History ==
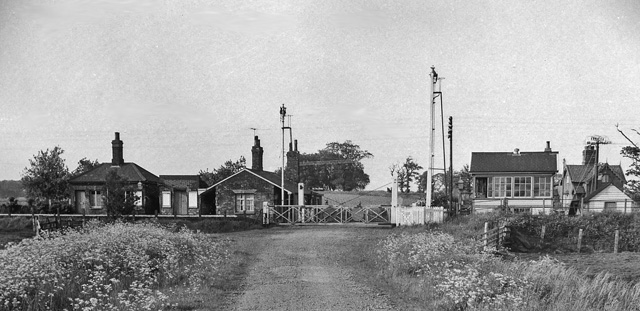
The station in 1963

The Yarmouth and Norwich Railway Act 1842 (5 & 6 Vict. c. lxxxii) authorising the Yarmouth and Norwich Railway (Y&NR), the first public railway line in Norfolk, received royal assent on 18 June 1842. Work started on the line in April 1843 and it opened on 1 May 1844. In June 1845, the Y&NR was amalgamated with the Norwich and Brandon Railway and Buckenham station became a Norfolk Railway asset.

The station buildings are currently used as a recording studio.

== Location ==
RSPB Buckenham Marshes is located next to the station, with RSPB Strumpshaw Fen a short walk away. Strumpshaw Hall Steam Museum is also located in the area.

== Facilities ==
There are shelters, departure screens and cycle spaces at the station. As there are no facilities to purchase tickets, passengers must buy one in advance, or from the guard on the train. The platforms themselves are staggered 150 yards apart.

== Passenger volume ==
According to usage estimates, Buckenham is one of the least used stations in the country, registering just 216 passenger entries/exits in 2018/19; this is partly due to the limited number of services that stop at the station. It was the least used station in Great Britain in 2000/01, with just 22 passengers.

Passenger volume at Buckenham
| | 2004–05 | 2005–06 | 2006–07 | 2007–08 | 2008–09 | 2009–10 | 2010–11 | 2011–12 | 2012–13 | 2013–14 | 2014–15 | 2015–16 | 2016–17 | 2017–18 | 2018–19 | 2019–20 | 2020–21 | 2021–22 | 2022–23 | 2023–24 | 2024–25 |
|---|---|---|---|---|---|---|---|---|---|---|---|---|---|---|---|---|---|---|---|---|---|
| Entries and exits | 39 | 29 | 22 | 97 | 132 | 154 | 106 | 100 | 72 | 80 | 88 | 134 | 122 | 202 | 216 | 212 | 98 | 300 | 354 | 360 | 284 |

The statistics cover twelve month periods that start in April.

== Services ==
The station has a limited service. There is one train to Norwich and one to Lowestoft on weekdays and Saturdays. On Sundays, there are six stopping trains westbound towards Norwich; eastbound, seven trains from Norwich call at the station, with three to Great Yarmouth, via Berney Arms, and four trains to Lowestoft. 100% of trains from Buckenham in 2024 arrived on time, one of five stations with this record.

| Preceding station | National Rail | Following station |
|---|---|---|
| Brundall | Greater Anglia; Wherry Lines | Cantley |

== Cultural references ==
In 2018, several scenes in Danny Boyle's film Yesterday were filmed at the station.

== Bibliography ==
- Quick, Michael (2023). Railway Passenger Stations in Great Britain: A Chronology (PDF) (5th ed.). London: Railway and Canal Historical Society.
