= Cumbria Coast =

English marine conservation zone

Coordinates: 54.5145°N 3.6639°W

Cumbria Coast is one of England's Marine Conservation Zones. It was designated in 2013 and is one of a number of such zones off the coast of Cumberland and Furness.

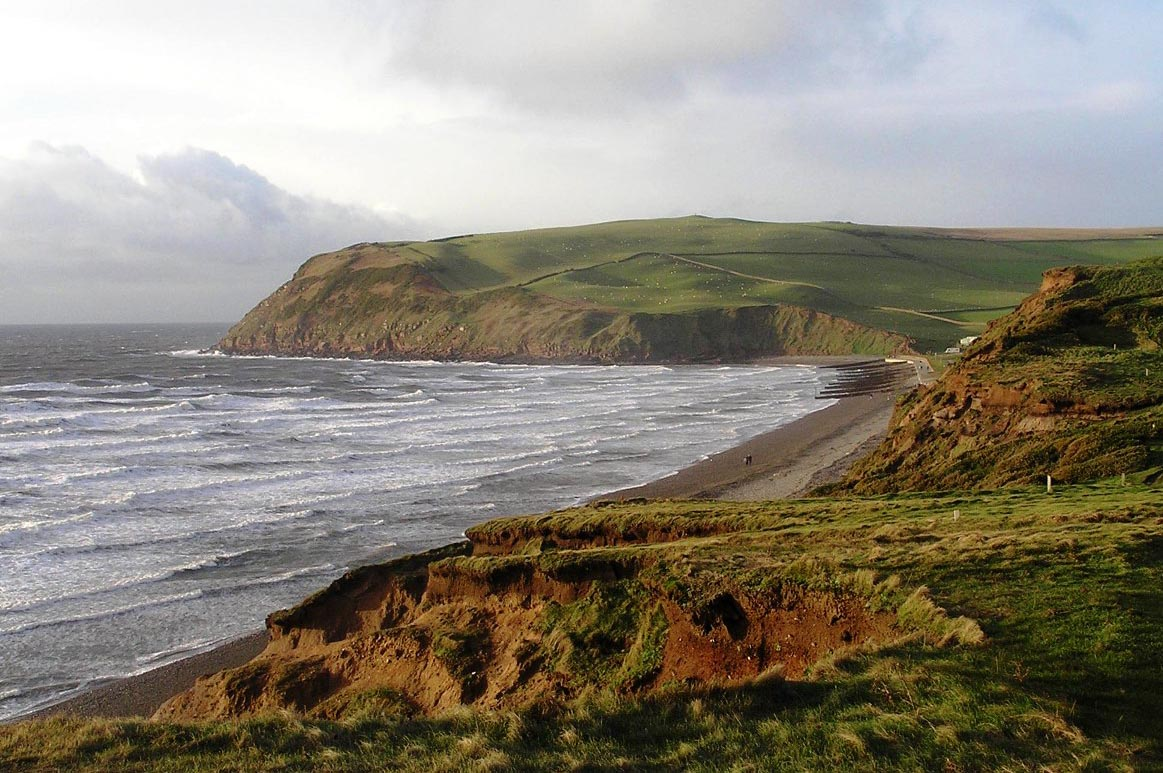
View of the South Head from the golf course at St Bees, Cumberland.

The MCZ covers the stretch of sea from Whitehaven down to the mouth of the Ravenglass Estuary. It includes the sea off Sellafield (the nuclear fuel reprocessing and nuclear decommissioning site) and off St Bees Head.

== Fauna ==
The MCZ protects underwater habitats and animals such as the honeycomb worm.

St Bees Head, where there is an RSPB reserve, is an important breeding site for sea birds.

== Extension ==
There was concern that the MCZ as originally designated did not protect enough of the foraging grounds of sea birds. In 2019 an addition was agreed.

== See also ==
At the time Cumbria Coast was designated the other MCZs on the Cumbrian coast were:

- Allonby Bay
- West of Walney
