= Strumpshaw Fen RSPB reserve =

RSPB nature reserve in Norfolk, England

RSPB Strumpshaw Fen
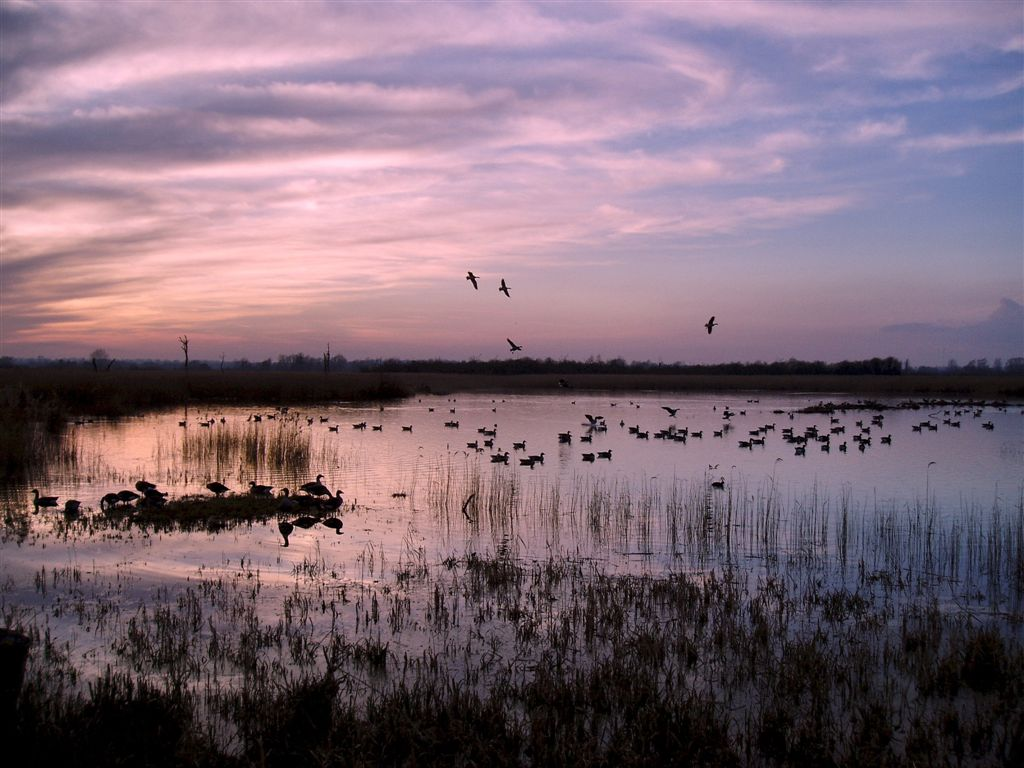
- A view from the Reception Hide over water showing mostly greylag goose (Anser anser) coming into land for the evening.
- Interactive map of RSPB Strumpshaw Fen
- Type: Nature reserve
- Location: Norfolk, England
- Coordinates: 52.6065°N 1.4558°E
- Operator: RSPB
- Public transit: Brundall railway station

Strumpshaw Fen is a nature reserve managed by the Royal Society for the Protection of Birds (RSPB). It is situated at Strumpshaw on the River Yare in the English county of Norfolk around 6 miles (9.7 km) east of Norwich. The Buckenham Marshes RSPB reserve borders the reserve to the east.

The reserve is part of the Mid-Yare National Nature Reserve established in 1997 by English Nature (though managed by the Royal Society for the Protection of Birds). It was purchased by the RSPB in 1974. It forms part of the Yare Broads and Marshes Site of Special Scientific Interest and lies within the area of The Broads.

== Wildlife ==
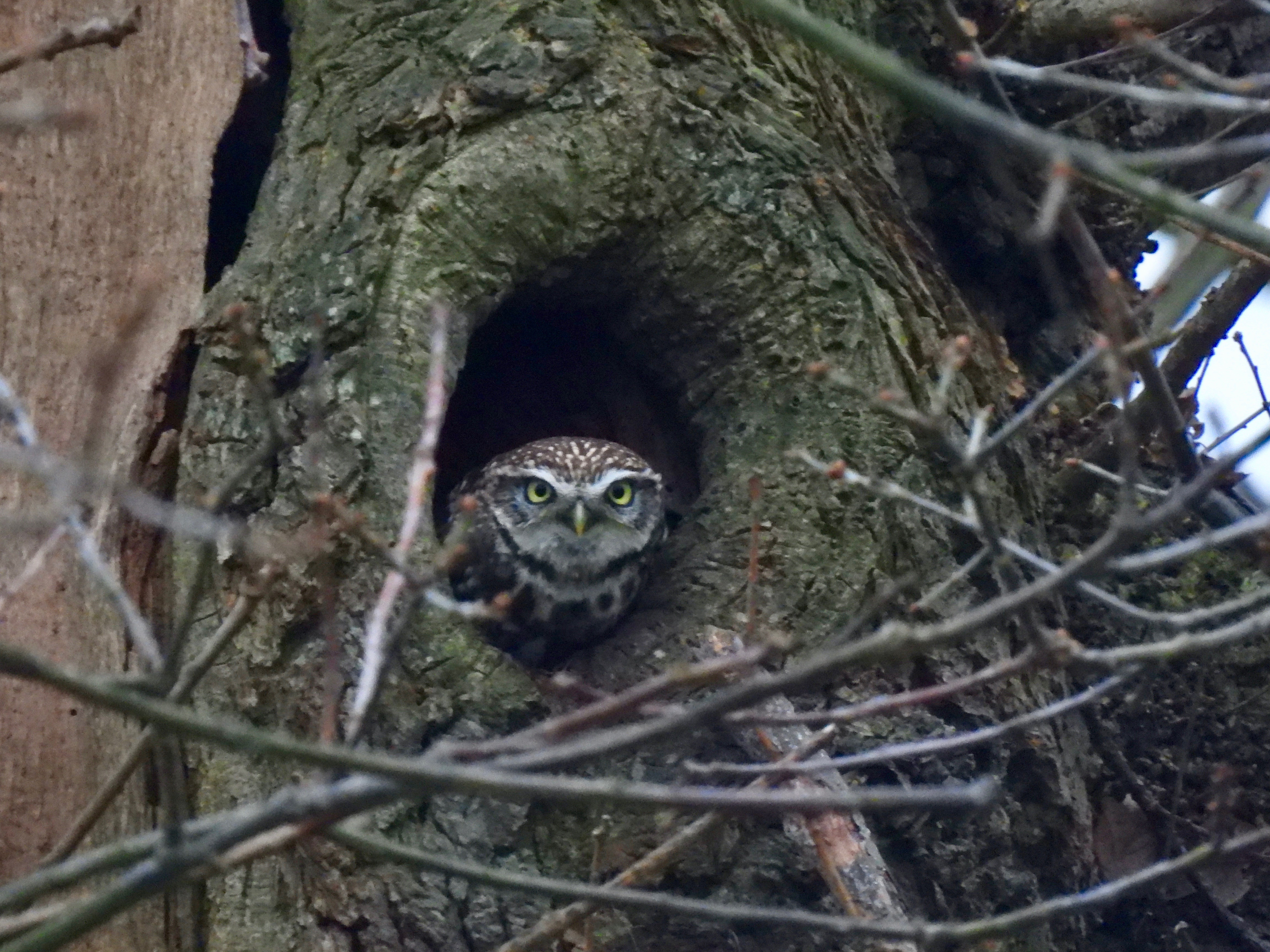
Little owl (Athene noctua) at Strumpshaw Fen

=== Birds ===
Residents

- Eurasian bittern; in spring, the male's 'booming' song can be heard. Though they are hard to see as they are well camouflaged.
- Common kingfisher present all year and carrying fish back to nests in spring and summer.
- Western marsh harrier; in spring, pairs perform 'sky-dancing' high in the sky.
- Cetti's warbler, the loudest British song bird with a distinctive (once learnt) 'explosive' song.
- Bearded tit,
- Barn owl, they often nest in the woodlands and can be seen hunting at dawn and dusk
- Eurasian bullfinches

Waterfowl include

- Gadwall,
- Great crested grebe and
- Little grebes.

Summer migrants

- Hobby,
- Reed warbler,
- Blackcap,
- Common whitethroat.

==== Winter residents ====
- Hen Harrier

In autumn the reserve is visited by migrating birds both heading south and those seeking refuge from the Arctic winter. These often form large flocks in the winter that gathering to feed or at dusk flying off together to form large roosts. Waxwings sometimes visit in search of winter food from Scandinavia.

=== Insects ===
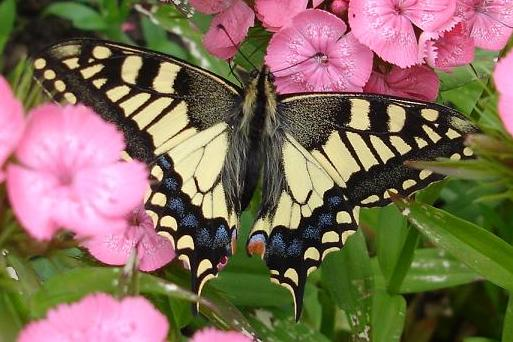
Swallowtail Papilio machaon brittanicus photographed at Strumpshaw Fen.

Its Fen provides one of the few breeding sites in Great Britain for the swallowtail. The subspecies found at Strumpshaw, Papilio machaon brittanicus, is endemic to the Fens of Norfolk and Suffolk in the UK. It is slightly smaller and more heavily marked in black than subspecies machaon and gorganus which are widespread throughout mainland Europe. It nearly always lays its eggs on milk parsley (Peucedanum palustre) in contrast to its European cousin that will select most umbellifers. Swallowtail can be seen from late May to mid-July and often again in mid-August to September. It is the largest resident British butterfly at 8 to 10 cm wingspan.

In early spring and summer the reserve is the habitat of 23 species of dragonfly, including the rare Norfolk hawker which is protected under Schedule 5 of the Wildlife and Countryside Act 1981, and listed in the British Red Data Books on Insects as Category 1 (endangered).

Another important dragon fly is the scarce chaser (Libellula fulva), and glow-worms can also be seen there.

=== Molluscs ===
- Desmoulin's whorl snail (On the list of endangered species in the British Isles)

=== Plants ===
It is one of only a handful of waterbodies in the country to contain holly-leaved naiad (Najas marina), a species on the flowering plant section of the list of endangered species in the British Isles and is protected under Schedule 8 of the Wildlife and Countryside Act 1981. Other important plants are milk parsley, marsh pea, saw sedge, six varieties of orchids including the rare aquatic macrophytes.

Its flower hay meadow is an ecological relict with a high plant diversity due to the continuing centuries old practice of receiving only a cut in late season for a hay crop. In June it is coloured by yellow flag, marsh cinquefoil, bog bean, and ragged robin (a source of nectar for the adult swallowtails). In early July, there are common sorrel, the purple glass Yorkshire fog, southern marsh orchids, yellow rattle and valerian. These are followed by purple loosestrife and meadowsweet.

=== Mammals ===
- Eurasian otters
- Water voles
- Chinese water deer

== Seasonal changes ==
=== Winter ===
- Hundreds of ducks, including teals, gadwalls and shovelers gather to feed in the reedbed pools.
- Near dusk, marsh and hen harriers gather to roost.
- On occasional winters, thousands of starlings roost in the reeds attracting sparrowhawks, peregrines and merlins.

=== Spring ===
- Courting pairs of marsh harriers perform 'sky-dancing' displays.
- Songs of spring migrant birds including reed and sedge warblers, cuckoos, grasshopper warblers and white throats.
- Swallows and swifts dart across the pools
- Great crested grebes and other waterfowl prepare their nests.
- Lesser spotted and great spotted woodpeckers easily heard drumming in the woodland.
- Booming bitterns can be heard from across the reserve, in 2017, there were up to 3 booming male bitterns on the reserve

=== Summer ===
- The UK's largest and one of its rarest butterflies, the swallowtail emerges at this time, remaining on the wing through to July
- Fen meadow rich with flowers including six species of orchids.
- Many butterflies, dragonflies and damselflies including swallowtail butterfly (late May to early July and again in mid-August).
- Hobbies hunt dragonflies.

=== Autumn ===
- Ospreys on their southward migration fish.
- Marsh harriers gather in groups to roost.
- Bearded tits form flocks in the reedbeds.

== Management ==
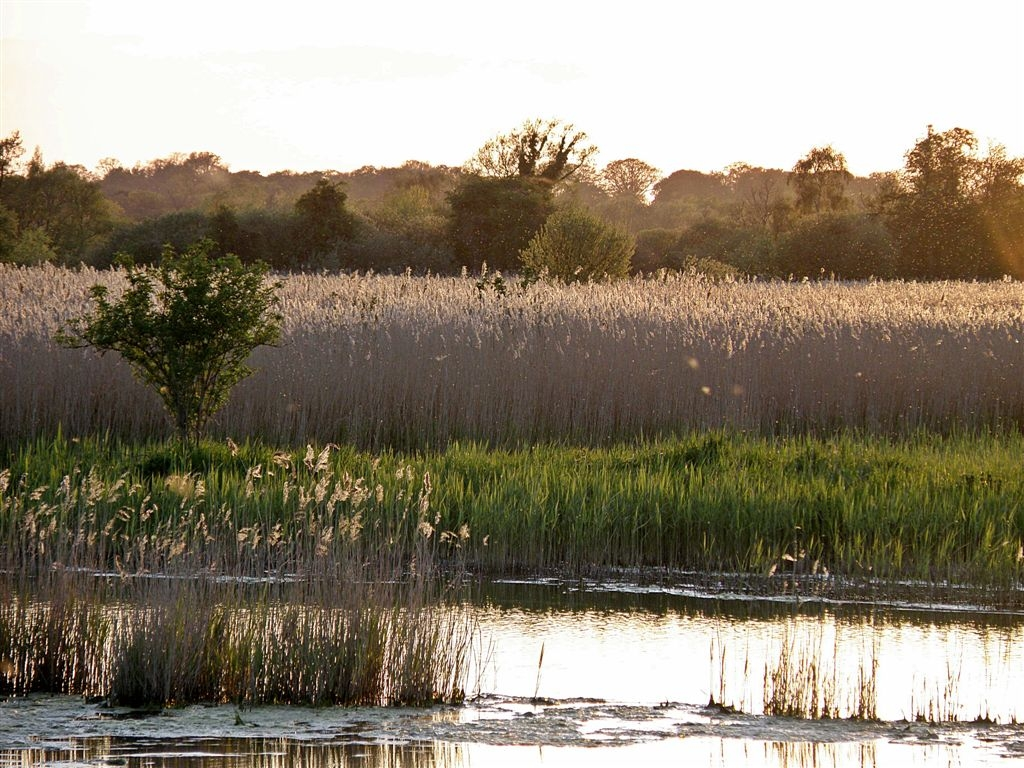
A view from the Fen hide showing the common reed Phragmites australis. The green reed was cut in winter and the taller reed was not.

The reserve contains several types of habitats including reed beds, grazing marshes, wet woodland, fen orchid-rich meadows, and the River Yare. These are managed through traditional techniques, including reed-cutting, mowing, cattle grazing and scrub removal.

When the RSPB purchased the fen in the mid-1970s, it was in a state of being heavily overgrown. Since then considerable effects have been made to restoring it to the open fen landscape of the 19th Century. Initially, this involved breaking up vegetation with high pressure jets and pumping out mud to recreate the broad. Ongoing restoration work presently includes scrub and invasive plants removal and repair of disused ditches.

Reed bed and fen meadow management includes summer mowing and grazing, seasonal flooding, maintaining water levels, clearing rushes, grazing and mowing, and trampling with livestock to create boggy ground. Wet woodland management includes protecting standing dead wood and keep water levels high from April to July.

The reserve contains the largest area of hay meadow in East Anglia that has remained untouched except for a late hay crop – a practice crucial to the maintenance of its plant diversity.

== Facilities ==
There are several hides and a number of trails.

The reserve is open from dawn until dusk every day (except Christmas Day). There are entrance charges (except for RSPB members). Some parts of trails after rain or river flooding can be muddy or wet so may require wearing walking boots.

== Pumping house ==
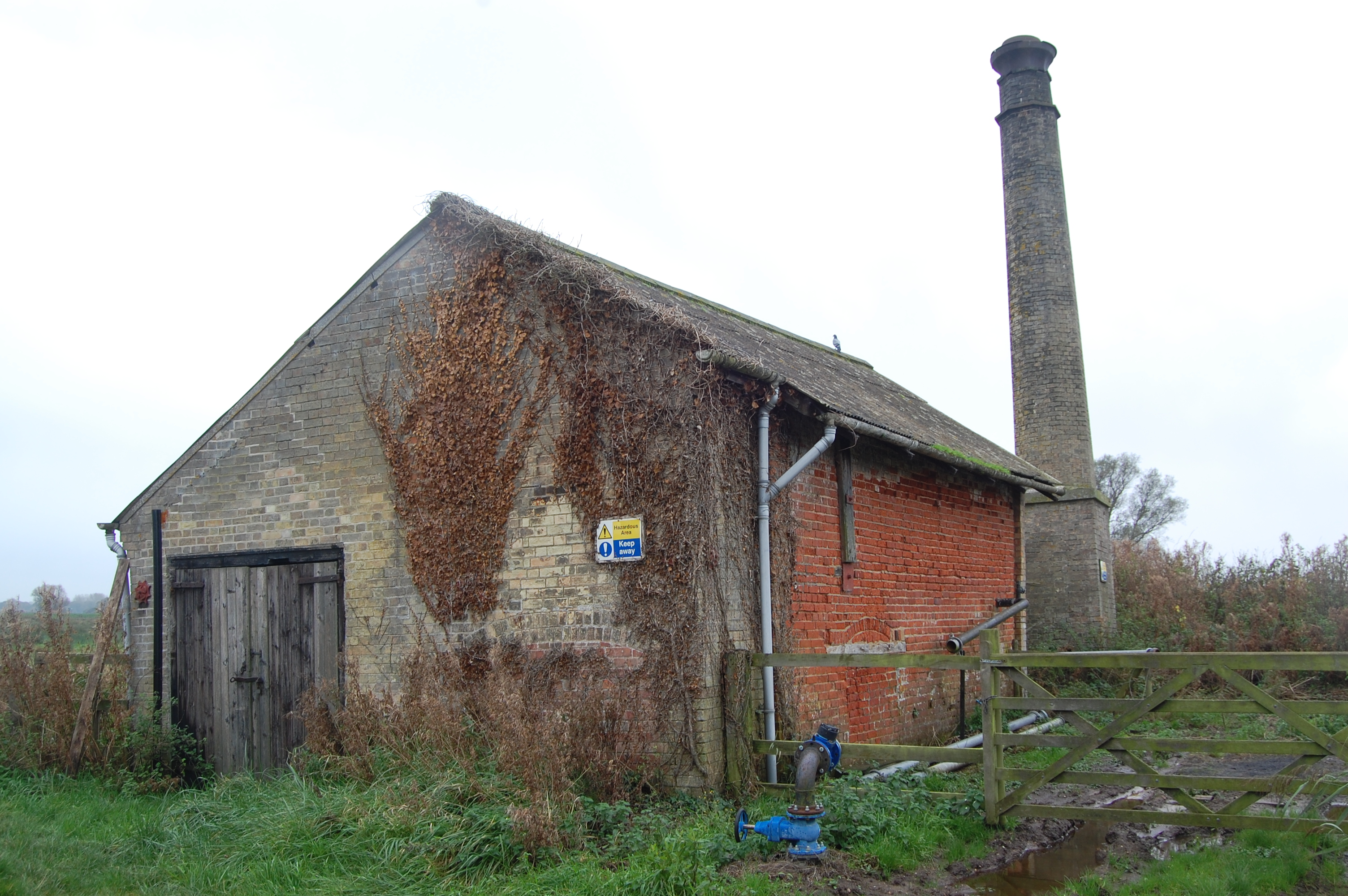
Former steam pumphouse and chimney

The fens at Strumpshaw were originally drained by a 1700s wind pump. In the late 1800s, this was replaced by a steam powered pump, whose brick-built engine house and free-standing brick chimney, alongside the river, remain. Nowadays, electric pumps are used.

== See also ==
- The Broads
- Buckenham railway station
- Mid-Yare National Nature Reserve
- Strumpshaw
- Strumpshaw Hall Steam Museum
