= Buckenham Marshes RSPB reserve =

RSPB nature reserve in Norfolk, England

Coordinates: 52.5973°N 1.4701°E

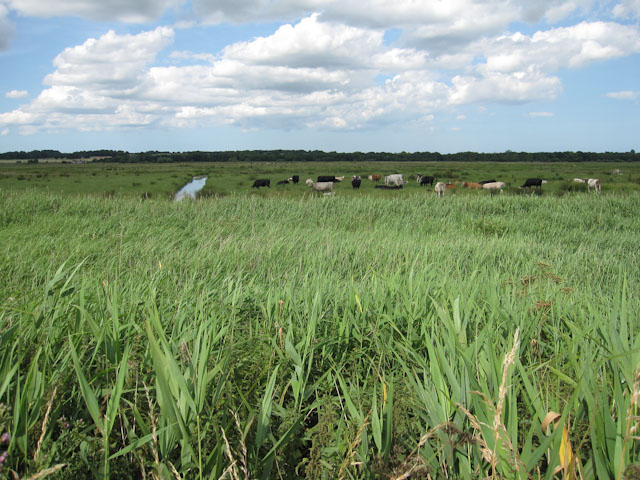
Buckenham Marshes

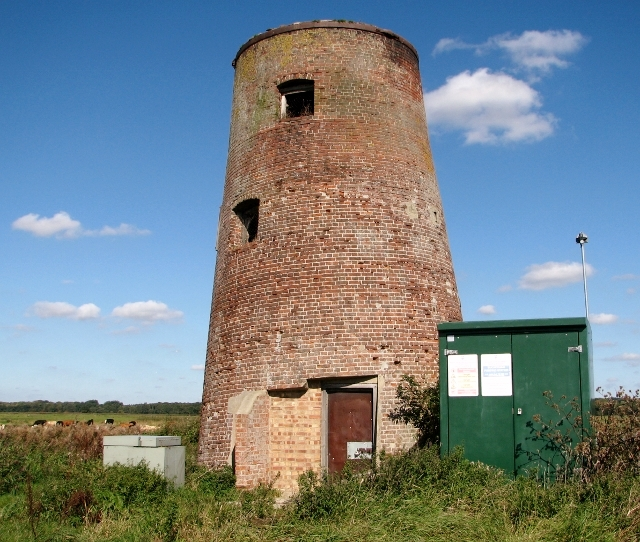
Buckenham Ferry Windmill serves as a bird hide for the reserve

.

Buckenham Marshes RSPB reserve is a nature reserve located on the northern bank of the River Yare in the English county of Norfolk. The reserve is located around 8 miles (13 km) south-east of Norwich near the village of Buckenham. The site, which is in The Broads, is managed by the Royal Society for the Protection of Birds.

The reserve consists of areas of reedbeds, grazing marsh and wet woodlands featuring species such as alder and willow. Areas of open water provide additional habitats. Key bird species include bean geese which over-winter at the site, the only location they regularly do so in England, lapwing and wigeon. An established rookery borders the site with up to 80,000 rooks roosting at the site, the largest rookery in Britain.

The RSPB Strumpshaw Fen reserve borders Buckenham Marshes to the west. Both reserves lie within the Mid-Yare National Nature Reserve and form part of the Yare Broads and Marshes Site of Special Scientific Interest. The reserve is adjacent to Buckenham railway station with the Wherry Lines railway line marking its northern boundary.
