= West Sedgemoor =

Area of the Somerset Levels, Somerset, England

- Site of Special Scientific Interest
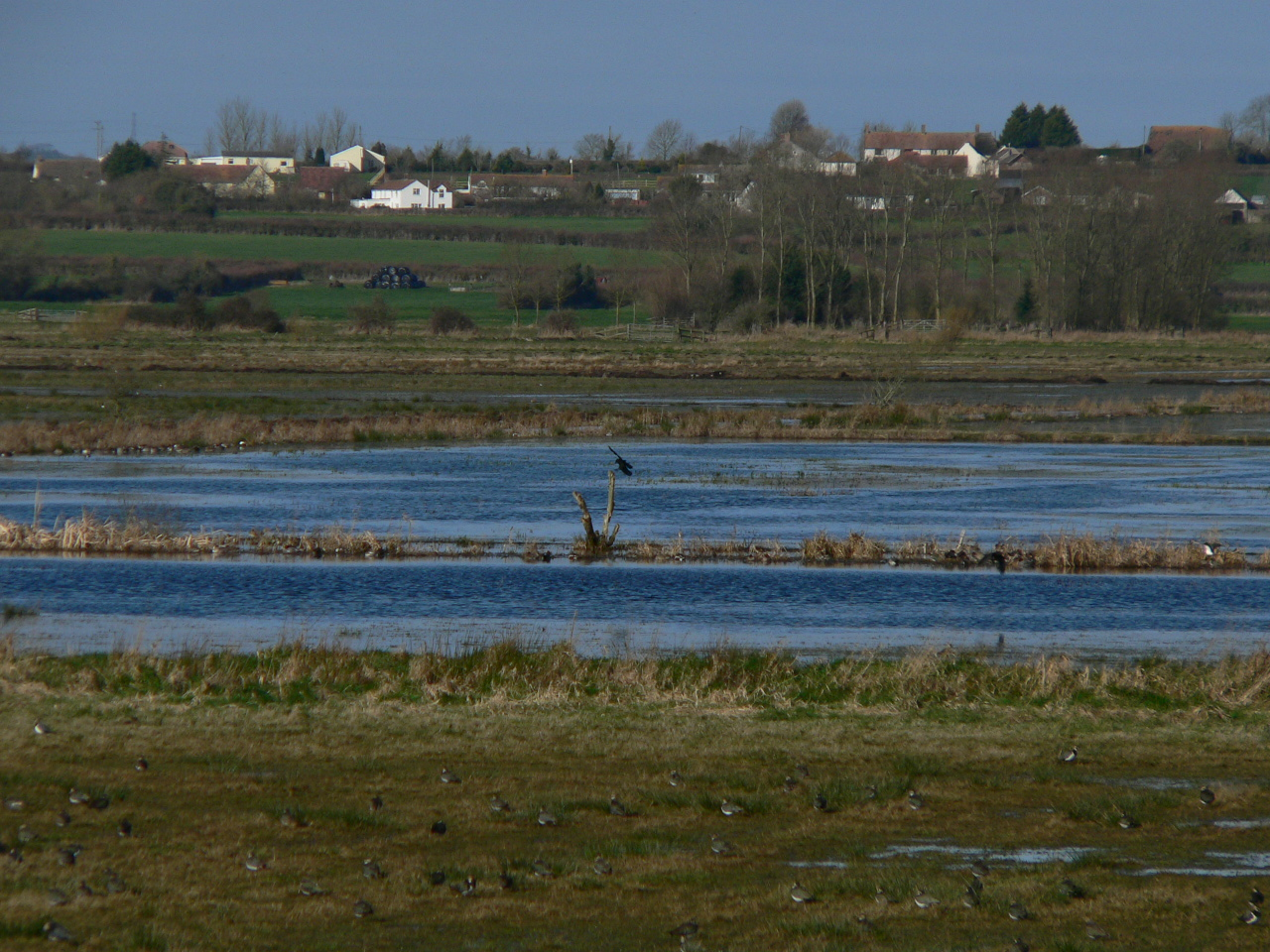
- A lake at the RSPB West Sedgemoor nature reserve

- Location within Somerset
- Location of West Sedgemoor.
- Area of search: Somerset
- Grid reference: ST361258
- Coordinates: 51.02800°N 2.91256°W
- Interest: Biological
- Area: 1,016 hectares (10.16 km^{2}; 3.92 sq mi)
- Notification date: 1983

West Sedgemoor or West Sedge Moor (grid reference ST361258) is an area of the Somerset Levels, in Somerset, England, around 8 miles (13 km) east of Taunton, which approximately coincides with the West Sedgemoor biological Site of Special Scientific Interest, a 1,016 hectare (3.9 sq miles) site notified as an SSSI in 1983. It is a flat, low-lying area (approx. 5 metres above sea level) of fields and meadows separated by water-filled rhynes and ditches. It is subject to controlled flooding in winter. It is drained by the River Parrett.

Part of the moor is a Royal Society for the Protection of Birds reserve. A rich invertebrate fauna is present including scarce water beetles, dragonflies and bugs. The site also supports good populations of waterfowl, especially waders. Breeding birds include snipe, lapwing, redshank, curlew, water rail, yellow wagtail and whinchat.

Swell Wood, an ancient deciduous wood on the southern edge of the reserve, has one of the UK's largest heronries, which is best visited between March and June.
