= RSPB Dungeness =

Nature reserve in the United Kingdom

- Interactive map of RSPB Dungeness
- Coordinates: 50.916667°N 0.966667°E

RSPB Dungeness is a nature reserve owned and managed by the Royal Society for the Protection of Birds (RSPB).

== Landscape ==
Dungeness headland is a cuspate foreland formed by longshore drift. It originally consisted of around 500 gravel beach ridges, although much of the structure has been lost due to centuries of gravel extraction. and major storms in the 12th and 13th centuries.The oldest exposed ridges on the west of the headland date back about 5,000 years, whereas those to the east, by the power station were formed between 500 and 1000 years ago. The shelter provided by the gravel barrier enabled the formation of marshes and natural pools in its lee.

The shingle is 98% flint and the exposed area covers 2,158 hectares (5,330 acres) with a further 1,150 hectares (2,800 acres) buried by alluvial deposits. The deposits can be up to 15 metres (49 ft) thick, with another 12 metres (39 ft) of mixed sand and gravel below that.

== History ==
=== Early history ===
Evidence of Bronze Age activity in the area includes a bronze axe, pottery fragments and worked flint. During the Romano-British period salt was made by taking saltwater trapped between the gravel ridges and heating it over fires.

== Access and facilities ==
The reserve is accessible by car from Lydd 1.6 kilometres (0.99 mi) away. It is also connected to Route 2 (Dover to St Austell) of the Sustrans National Cycle Network by the Suffolk Coast Cycle route. The nearest bus access is in Lydd, and rail access is in Rye 16 kilometres (9.9 mi) distant

Entry to the reserve is free for RSPB members, although a fee is charged for non-members. The site is open daily from 9 am to sunset or 9 pm, which ever is later. Except for 25 and 26 December, it is open year-round. The visitor centre and facilities are open from 10 am and close at 4 pm from November to February, 5 pm the rest of the year. Only assistance dogs are allowed within the reserve; all other dogs must be kept within the car park on a lead.

The visitor centre provides a café, picnic area, shop and toilets and baby-changing facilities; guided walks and binocular hire are also available. The main 3.2 kilometres (2.0 mi) circular nature trail and two 380 metres (1,250 ft) tracks from the trail to a bird hide and a viewing screen can be accessed by wheelchair and pushchair users, and all the hides can accommodate wheelchairs too.

=== Lade Pits ===
The Lade Pits site was donated to the RSPB by Cemex in 2015. The pits were created by the commercial extraction of four million tonnes of gravel and sand from the 70 hectares (170 acres) site. As well as habitats including open water, shingle and marshland, the site holds the Denge Sound Mirrors, large concrete structures built between 1928 and 1935. In the days before radar, they were intended to focus and amplify the sound of enemy aircraft approaching the coast, enabling early detection. All three are scheduled monuments. The site is open year round and access is free, although the island on which the sound mirrors stand can only be visited by prior arrangement.

The site has Site of Special Scientific Interest (SSSI), Special Area of Conservation (SAC), Ramsar and Special Protection Area (SPA) status.

== Fauna and flora ==
=== Birds ===
Dungeness's location and range of habitats make it a major site for rare species. Notable recent occurrences include a short-toed treecreeper in 2015, Audouin's Gull and Blyth's reed warbler in 2014, crested lark in 2012, collared pratincole in 2011 and white-tailed lapwing in 2010.

=== Other animals and plants ===
Invertebrates include medicinal leeches and Sussex emerald moth, the latter being uncommon in the UK.

== Cited texts ==
- Long, A J; Plater, A J; Waller, M P; Roberts, H; Laidler, P D; Stupples, P; Schofield, E (2004). The Depositional and Landscape Histories of Dungeness Foreland and the Port of Rye (PDF). University of Durham.
