= Church Woods, Blean =

Protected area in Kent, England

Coordinates: 51.301°N 1.015°E

- Site of Special Scientific Interest
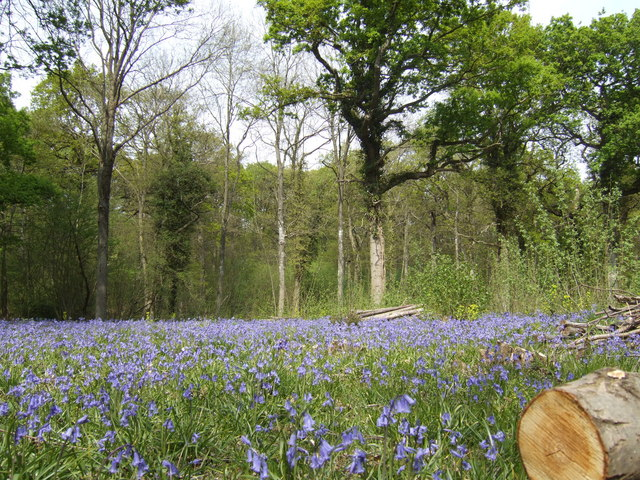
- Location of Church Woods, Blean.
- Area of search: Kent
- Grid reference: TR 103 601
- Interest: Biological
- Area: 526.7 hectares (1,302 acres)
- Notification date: 2000
- Location map: Magic Map

Church Woods, Blean is a 526.7-hectare (1,302-acre) biological Site of Special Scientific Interest north-west of Canterbury in Kent. It is a Nature Conservation Review site, Grade I, a National Nature Reserve, a Special Area of Conservation and part of it is a Royal Society for the Protection of Birds nature reserve.

This broadleaved coppice with standards wood has trees, flora, a wide variety of birds and many invertebrates, including the nationally rare heath fritillary butterfly.

There is public access to the site and it is crossed by footpaths.

== History ==
Church Wood, historically known as Short Wood or Short Tenement, is at least 800 years old; however, evidence of human activity traces further back. Archeological findings in Church Wood of blades, scrapers, and axes date to the Mesolithic. The woodland was surveyed by request of the Dean of Canterbury and estimated to be 1200 to 1400 acres and around 32,000 oak trees. A map dated around 1807 shows Church Wood as part of the Dean of Canterbury estate. During the Second World War, two large concrete roadblocks were built along New Road in Church Wood. In the 1950s, the woods were sold by the Church Commissioners to new owners, who planted conifers in the area. The RSPB purchased parts of Church Wood in 1981 as part of a larger purchase of the ancient Blean woodlands. In 1991, a group formed to purchase parts of Church Wood that had not already been bought by the RSPB.
