= St Bees Head RSPB reserve =

Coordinates: 54.490688°N 3.603500°W

St Bees Head RSPB Reserve
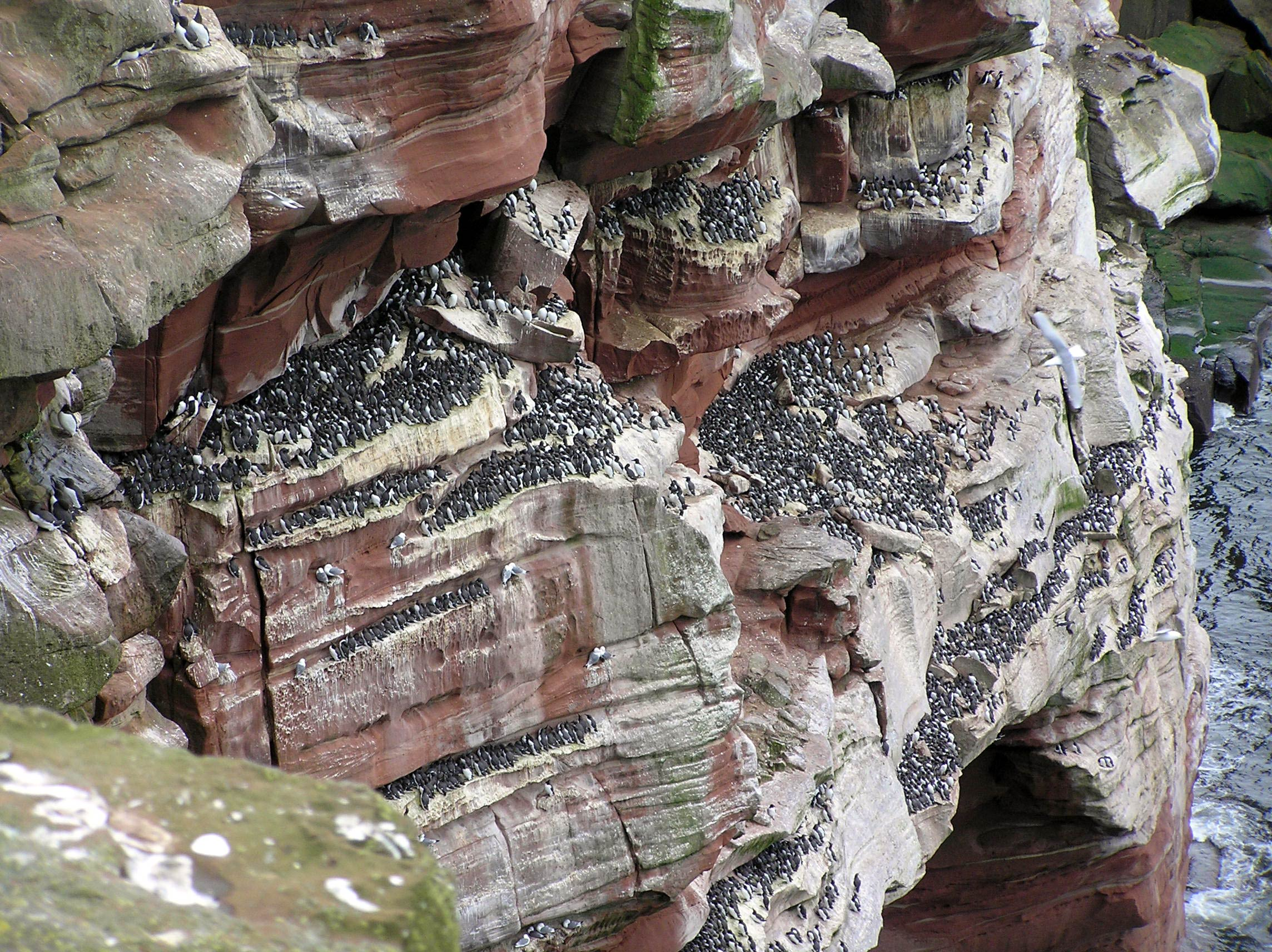
- Guillemots on the North Head
- Interactive map of St Bees Head RSPB Reserve
- Location: Cumbria, England
- Elevation: 90 m (300 ft)
- Operator: Royal Society for the Protection of Birds
- Website: St Bees Head

St Bees Head RSPB Reserve at St Bees Head, Cumbria, England, is a coastal site which provides a home for thousands of seabirds under the care of the RSPB. The birds include kittiwakes, fulmars, guillemots, razorbills, cormorants, Atlantic puffins, shags and herring gulls. It is the only breeding place in England for black guillemots.

The rock pipit, which breeds on rocky coasts, is known to breed in only one other site in Cumbria. As well as the seabirds already mentioned, other birds which regularly breed at St Bees Head include the tawny owl, sparrowhawk, peregrine and the common raven.

In partnership with Natural England, the National Trust and local government authorities, the RSPB has also been involved in a project to improve coastal habitats outside the reserve. One aim is to have suitable grassland to support the return of the chough.

== Facilities ==
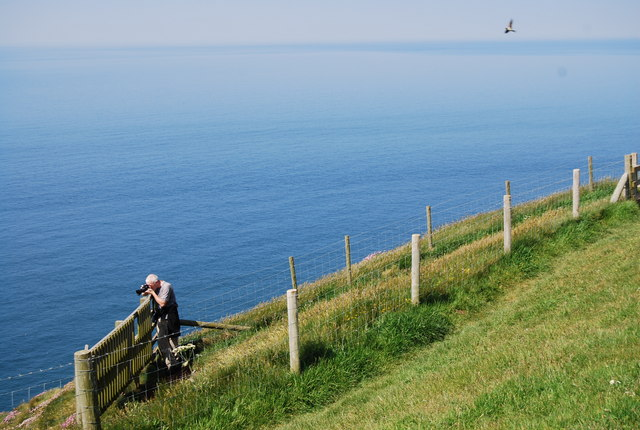
Viewing Point

There are observation stations on the North Head footpath. The cliffs rise to 90 metres and visitors are advised to take care when approaching the edge.

== Protection designations ==
St Bees Head is:

- A Heritage Coast
- A Site of Special Scientific Interest (157.2402 ha), designated for biological and geological interest.

The geographical limits to SSSI selection stop at mean low water spring tides, and essential areas for foraging seabirds cannot be protected through the existing SSSI mechanism. However, the sea off St Bees Head is part of the Cumbria Coast Marine Conservation Zone. The Marine Conservation Zone was designated in 2013. After concern was expressed that it did not do enough to protect the foraging grounds of seabirds, it was extended in 2019.

The NWIFCA (North Western Inshore Fisheries and Conservation Authority) is working with Natural England and RSPB to call for a voluntary ban on the use of fishing nets around St Bees Headland.
