= Bowness Common =

Protected area in Cumbria, England

- Site of Special Scientific Interest
- Location within Cumbria
- Location of Bowness Common.
- Area of search: Cumbria
- Grid reference: NY205601
- Coordinates: 54.929224°N 3.2421417°W
- Area: 1,875 acres (7.588 km^{2}; 2.930 sq mi)
- Notification date: 1983

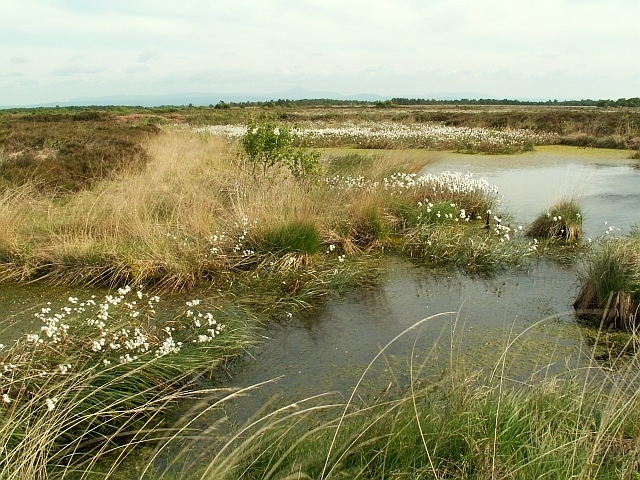
Bowness Common

Bowness Common is a Site of Special Scientific Interest (SSSI) between Cardurnock and Glasson in Cumbria, England. This protected area includes South Solway Mosses National Nature Reserve. Bowness Common SSSI also includes the southern section of Campfield Marsh Nature Reserve, managed by the Royal Society for the Protection of Birds.

Bowness Common SSSI is located close to other protected areas including Glasson Moss SSSI and Drumburgh Moss SSSI. South Solway Mosses were designated as a Special Area of Conservation in 2005.

== Details ==
Bowness Common is the largest raised mire remaining in England. The site has wet heath vegetation that persists above a thick layer of peat.

Vascular plants include chickweed wintergreen, bog asphodel and three species of sundew: Drosera anglica, Drosera intermedia and Drosera rotundifolia. Moss species include Sphagnum magellanicum, Dicranum undulatum and Dicranum polysetum. ^{.}

Bird species include curlew, snipe, sedge warbler, grasshopper warbler, black grouse and hen harrier.

The butterfly called the large heath has been recorded at this protected area, and white-faced darter dragonflies have returned to Campfield Marsh in recent years.

== Land ownership ==
Two major landowners own land in Bowness Common SSSI: the Royal Society for the Protection of Birds (the central section of the SSSI) and the Ministry of Defence (the western section near the boundary with Anthorn Radio Station).
