= Strumpshaw Hall Steam Museum =

Museum in Strumpshaw, Norfolk, England

Coordinates: 52.6058°N 1.4625°E

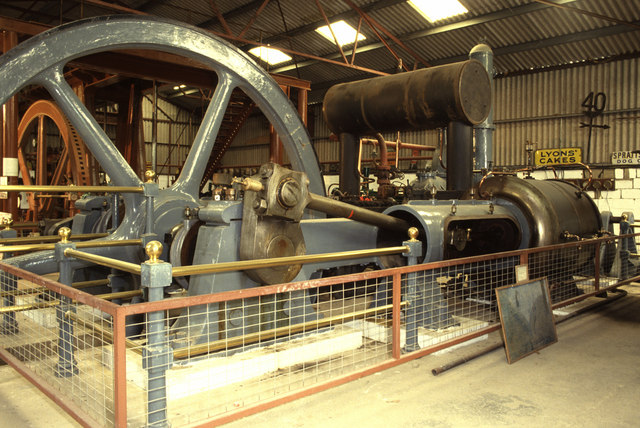
One of the two steam pumping engines from Waddon Pumping Station, at Strumpshaw, 1993

The Strumpshaw Hall Steam Museum in Strumpshaw, Norfolk, is home to a collection of traction engines, steam rollers, a showman's engine and a steam wagon which are run on special occasions and on the last Sunday of each month from April to October.

The Hall itself is Grade II listed, and in the grounds are a touring caravan site. Neighbouring the hall and farm estate is the Strumpshaw Fen RSPB reserve.

== Strumpshaw Hall ==
The existing house was built in 1835 by Thomas Tuck. The two-storey property is built of red brick on a rendered base, featuring three bays enclosing sash windows, topped by a hipped slate roof and two chimneys. Within the central bay, extended by a pediment, it features a Doric porch. The main house was added to in the Victorian era with a lower two-storey service wing, which is three windows wide. It was listed Grade II in 1979.

== History ==
The collection was started privately by Wesley Key, and his family still own the hall, grounds and most of the exhibits. Key eventually opened his collection to the public, initially on open days and latterly as a museum, which still opens between April and October. The museum is presently owned by Wesley's grandson Jimmy Key.

== Museum display ==
The main collection is housed in an extended area of the former farm on the estate, together with some redeveloped outbuildings and a specially developed extension. Internally the collection includes a diverse collection of mobile and stationary industrial and agricultural engines, mostly powered by steam alongside some early internal combustion engines. There is a fairground and theatre collection, which includes a large Christie Wonder Organ. The museum has the last surviving example of a Garret type of traction engine still in service, a working steam wagon, a ploughing traction engine with a threshing machine, and an old plough with the ploughing engine.

Externally the museum has a narrow gauge railway, which run on most open days. This consists of a Simplex diesel disguised as a steam engine, pulling a simple four-wheeled coach. The co-located farm has some fairground rides on site which are usually in operation and accessible to visitors. It also has a collection of rare breeds of birds.

== Strumpshaw Steam Rally ==
The park is used for an annual steam rally that is held each year on the Spring Bank Holiday weekend. The event features several of the museum's engines in steam, with about 50 other visiting engines present, as well as 30 miniatures in steam. The event also has large numbers of vintage and classic tractors and commercial vehicles on display with a daily parade.

== Manufacturers featured in collection ==
Not all on display.

- Aveling and Porter – 3 Steam rollers, 2 'tractors'
- Burrell – 3 Traction engines, including 1921 Princess Royal
- Foden – 1 Steam waggon
- John Fowler & Co. – 1 pair of Ploughing engines (15340 + 15341)
- Garrett – 1 Traction engine
- Marshall, Sons & Co. – 5 Traction engines, 1 steam roller
- Ransomes, Sims & Jefferies – Portable engine
- Ruston Proctor – Traction engine
- Wallis & Steevens – Traction engine

Vintage tractors

- David Brown
- Field Marshall
- International Harvester

Horizontal engines

- Robey & Co.

Beam engine

- A large beam engine that was saved from a local water works is being restored.

Rail locomotive

- Cagney Bros. - 16 in. gauge 4-4-0 steam locomotive

== See also ==
- List of steam fairs
