= Southwood, Norfolk =

Hamlet in Norfolk, England

Coordinates: 52.593206°N 1.5362915°E

Southwood
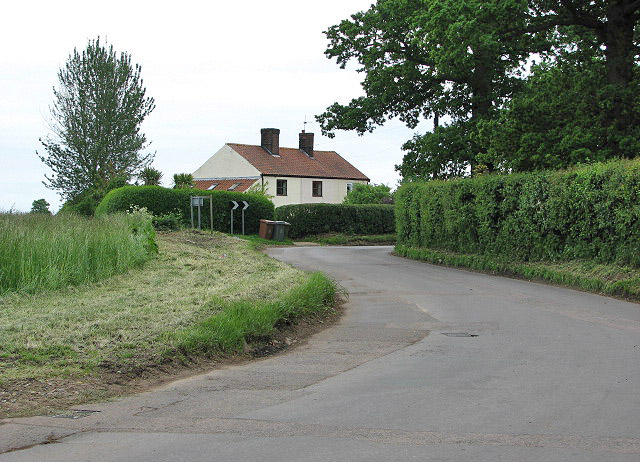

- Location within Norfolk
- Civil parish: Cantley, Limpenhoe and Southwood
- District: Broadland
- Shire county: Norfolk
- Region: East
- Country: England
- Sovereign state: United Kingdom
- Police: Norfolk
- Fire: Norfolk
- Ambulance: East of England

Southwood is a hamlet and former civil parish, 10 miles (16 km) east of Norwich, now in the parish of Cantley, Limpenhoe and Southwood, in the Broadland district, in the county of Norfolk, England. In 1931 the parish had a population of 40. It has a church called St Edmund which is in ruins. Southwood Hall is a post medieval great house and serves as a wedding venue.

== History ==
The name "Southwood" means 'South wood'. Southwood was recorded in the Domesday Book as Sudw(a)da/Suthuide/Sutwde. On 1 April 1935 the parish was abolished and merged with Cantley.
