= Buckenham =

Village in Norfolk, England

Coordinates: 52.599°N 1.477°E

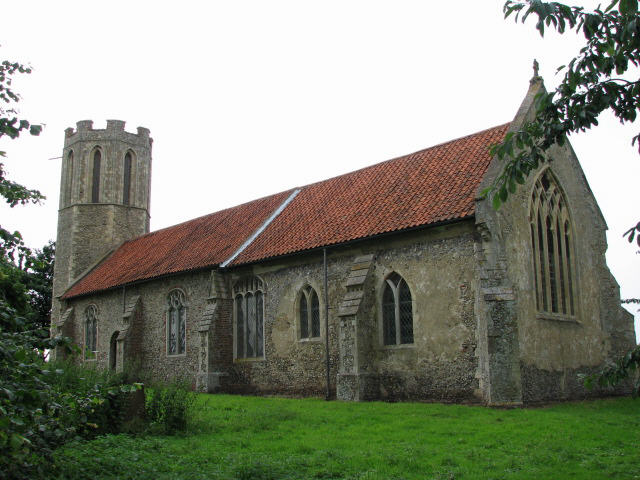
- St Nicholas' Church, Buckenham

- Location within Norfolk
- Civil parish: Strumpshaw
- District: Broadland
- Shire county: Norfolk
- Region: East
- Country: England
- Sovereign state: United Kingdom
- Post town: NORWICH
- Postcode district: NR12
- Dialling code: 01603

Buckenham is a village in the civil parish of Strumpshaw, in the Broadland district, in the English county of Norfolk. It is located 4 miles (6.4 km) south-west of Acle and 8 miles (13 km) east of Norwich on the northern bank of the River Yare. Buckenham Marshes RSPB reserve in the parish is a bird reserve operated by the RSPB and much of the area of the former parish lies within The Broads National Park.

Buckenham's name is of Anglo-Saxon origin and in the Domesday Book it is recorded as a settlement of 195 households in the Hundred of Blofield. It formed part of the estates of William the Conqueror, Bury St Edmunds Abbey and William d'Ecouis.

In 1931, the parish had a population of 128. This was the last time separate population statistics were collected for Buckenham as on 1 April 1935, the civil parish was abolished and merged with Strumpshaw.

The nearby Buckenham Marshes RSPB reserve is a popular location for birdwatching, including taiga bean geese, northern lapwing and wigeon. Buckenham Railway Station serves the village, outlying communities and the RSPB reserve. It is a stop on the Wherry Lines, with limited services to Norwich, Great Yarmouth and Lowestoft.

== St. Nicholas' Church ==
Buckenham's parish church is dedicated to Saint Nicholas and dates from the 13th century. It is Grade I listed with a doorway which dates to the 12th century. T church fell into disuse and disrepair in the 1970s and is now in the care of the Churches Conservation Trust. It has a carved medieval font and originally had stained-glass windows designed by Yarrington which were destroyed by vandals in the late-20th century. The church contains memorials to members of the Beauchamp family and Reverend George Elwin.
