= Northward Hill =

Protected area in Kent, England

Coordinates: 51.457°N 0.562°E

- Site of Special Scientific Interest
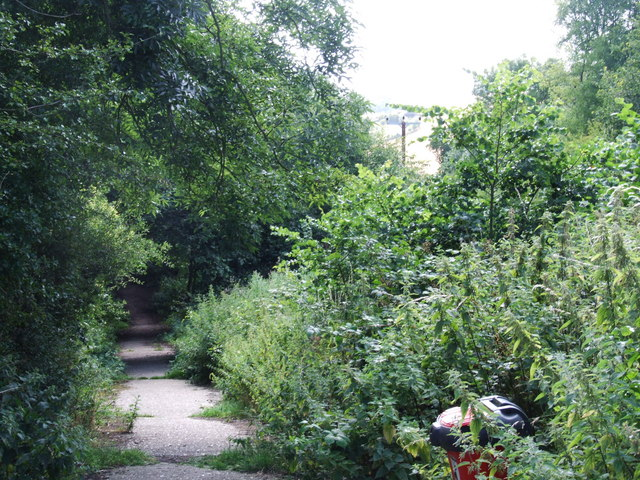
- Location of Northward Hill.
- Area of search: Kent
- Grid reference: TQ 781 762
- Interest: Biological
- Area: 52.5 hectares (130 acres)
- Notification date: 1984
- Location map: Magic Map

Northward Hill is a 52.5-hectare (130-acre) biological Site of Special Scientific Interest Kent. It is a Nature Conservation Review site, Grade 2, and is also designated High Halstow National Nature Reserve The site is managed by the Royal Society for the Protection of Birds.

This site has mixed woodland, scrub, ponds, grassland and bracken. It has the largest heronry in Britain, with more than 200 pairs, and insects include the scarce sloe carpet and least carpet moths.

There is access by public footpaths from High Halstow.
