= Surlingham Church Marsh RSPB reserve =

Nature reserve in England

Coordinates: 52°36′40″N 1°24′26″E

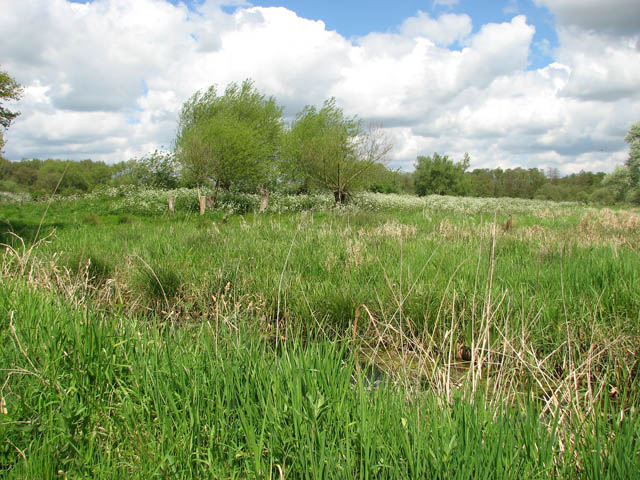
Church Marsh Nature Reserve in early May 2009

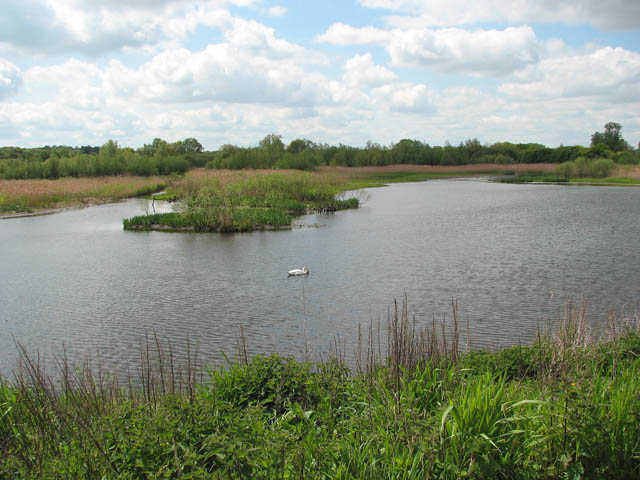
The pool within the reserve

Surlingham Church Marsh is a small RSPB nature reserve in the Norfolk Broads, England. It is part of Yare Broads and Marshes Site of Special Scientific Interest

Situated north of the village of Surlingham and south of the River Yare, it comprises 68 acres (28 hectares) of mixed wetland habitat including shallow open water, dykes, reed and sedge fen, and small areas of willow carr, as well as deciduous woodland on the southern margin of the reserve.

A footpath of about 1 1/4 miles (2.0 km) circumnavigates the reserve from Surlingham Church, down and along the river Yare and a hide overlooks a shallow pool within the reserve. There is a no fishing policy on the river bank within the reserve. Dogs are allowed but should be kept under control.

Notable amongst the breeding birds are gadwall, shovelers, and reed, sedge, grasshopper and Cetti's warblers. Marsh harriers are regular visitors and occasionally breed. Migrants include jack snipe and green sandpiper, and winter visitors include hen harriers and bearded tits.

The reserve also supports several species of dragonfly, and a variety of butterflies, various other insects and invertebrates, and many species of wild flower, orchid, and particularly aquatic plants.

Purchased in 1984 as a potential habitat for marsh harriers and bitterns, the reserve is now managed mostly for its fen plant communities and the invertebrates which feed off them. Water levels are managed by the use of a sluice gate. A small number of highland cattle summer graze on the fen to improve habitat quality and to assist with the removal of scrub from the fen.

The naturalist Ted Ellis is buried at the nearby ruin of St Saviour's church.
