= Yare Broads and Marshes =

UK Site of Special Scientific Interest

Coordinates: 52.602°N 1.448°E

- Site of Special Scientific Interest
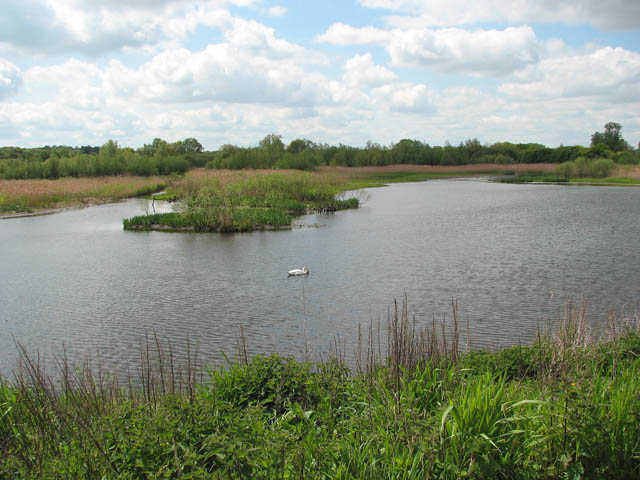
- Surlingham Church Marsh RSPB Nature Reserve
- Location of Yare Broads and Marshes.
- Area of search: Norfolk
- Grid reference: TG 336 061
- Interest: Biological
- Area: 744.5 hectares (1,840 acres)
- Notification date: 1988
- Location map: Magic Map

Yare Broads and Marshes is a 744.5-hectare (1,840-acre) biological Site of Special Scientific Interest east of Norwich in Norfolk, England. Part of the site is a Nature Conservation Review site, Grade I and most of it is in the Mid-Yare National Nature Reserve. It is part of the Broadland Ramsar site and Special Protection Area, and The Broads Special Area of Conservation. Two ares are Royal Society for the Protection of Birds nature reserves, Strumpshaw Fen and Surlingham Church Marsh.

It is a nationally important wetland site, with grazing marsh, open water, fen, carr woodland and peat. There are many nationally rare plants and many birds including nationally important wintering flocks of wigeon.
