= Bruce Rushin =

English artist and coin designer

- Born: 1956 (age 69–70)
- Education: Ravensbourne College of Art and Design
- Known for: designs for British coins
- Website: brucerushin.co.uk

Signature
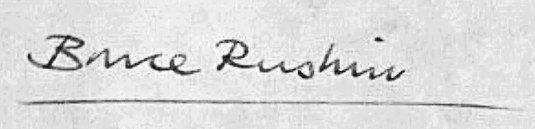

Bruce Rushin is an English artist, whose designs for coins include the reverse of the original British two pound coin, which went into general circulation in 1998.

== Education and career ==
Bruce Rushin was born in February 1956. He attended Wyggeston Grammar School for Boys, and Ravensbourne College of Art and Design. He taught art at Flegg High School in Martham, Norfolk from 1990 to 2008, afterwards teaching at Stalham High School. He paints using acrylic paint and mixed media, and produces linocuts.

== Coin designs ==
Although he had no previous experience in coin design, in 1997 Rushin won the competition for the design of the British two pound coin, the first coin of that value to be made of two components consisting of different alloys, and the first base metal £2 coin. The design uses concentric rings to illustrate technological progress, and is inscribed with the text "Standing on the shoulders of giants", a phrase taken from a letter written in 1675 by the English scientist Isaac Newton. The design includes Rushin's initials ("BR") within one of the concentric circles.

The coin is included in the collections of the Science Museum Group and the Royal Collection Trust.

In 2012 Rushin won a second competition to design two commemorative 50 pence coins, for the 2012 Summer Olympics and the 2012 Summer Paralympics held in London.

== Sources ==
- Pearce, Nigel, ed. (1998). Britain 1999: The Official Yearbook of the United Kingdom (50th anniversary ed.). London: HMSO. p. n571. ISBN 9780116210371.
