= Potter Heigham Bridge Halt railway station =

Former railway station in Norfolk, England

Coordinates: 52.7109°N 1.5821°E

Potter Heigham Bridge Halt
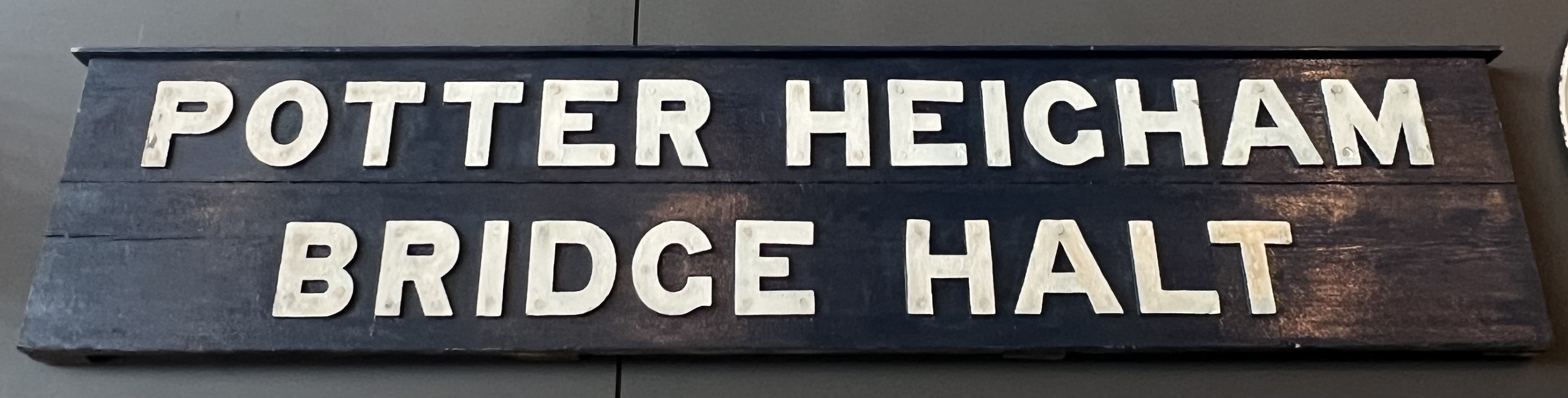
- Station sign in the collection at Thinktank, Birmingham Science Museum

General information
- Location: Potter Heigham, North Norfolk; England
- Grid reference: TG420185
- Platforms: 1

Other information
- Status: Disused

History
- Post-grouping: Midland and Great Northern Joint Railway; Eastern Region of British Railways

Key dates
- 17 July 1933: Opened
- September 1939: Closed
- June 1948: Reopened
- 27 September 1958: Last day of services
- 2 March 1959: Official closure
Location

Potter Heigham Bridge Halt was a railway station on the Midland and Great Northern Joint Railway which was opened to serve the boating traffic on the River Thurne. It was more conveniently situated to the Norfolk village of Potter Heigham than Potter Heigham station itself.

== History ==
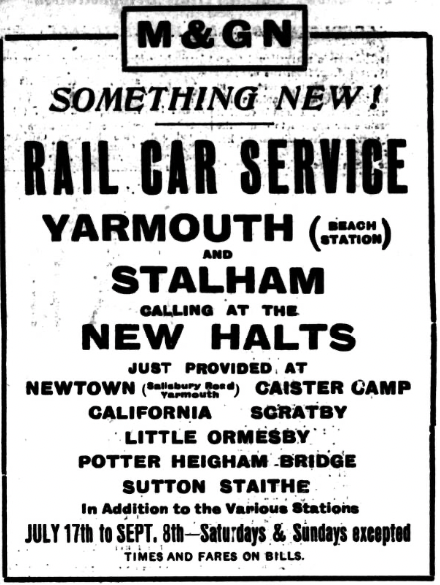
Advertisement from the Yarmouth Independent on Saturday 15 July 1933

In 1933 the Midland and Great Northern Joint Railway introduced a small railcar “Tantivy” to enhance the summer service on the line between Yarmouth and Stalham. This allowed the introduction of seven new halts, which saved people walking a mile or more to the nearest station. The new halts were for Newtown, Caister Holiday Camp, California, Scratby, Little Ormesby, Potter Heigham Bridge and Sutton Staithe. Each of these was a request stop

The station was closed as a wartime measure before passing briefly to the Eastern Region of British Railways on nationalisation in 1948 only to be closed by British Railways in 1959.

Preceding station	Disused railways	Following station
Potter Heigham	Midland and Great Northern; Yarmouth Line	Martham

== The Station Today ==
Barely anything remains of the station except the station platform wall.
