= Sutton Staithe Halt railway station =

Former railway station in Norfolk, England

Coordinates: 52.7592°N 1.5300°E

Sutton Staithe Halt

General information
- Location: Sutton, North Norfolk; England
- Grid reference: TG382239
- Platforms: 1

Other information
- Status: Disused

History
- Post-grouping: Midland and Great Northern Joint Railway

Key dates
- 17 July 1933: Opened
- 8 July 1935: Closed
Location

Sutton Staithe Halt was a railway station on the Midland and Great Northern Joint Railway which was opened in 1933 to serve the holidaymakers visiting the Norfolk Broads in the vicinity of the village of Sutton.

== History ==
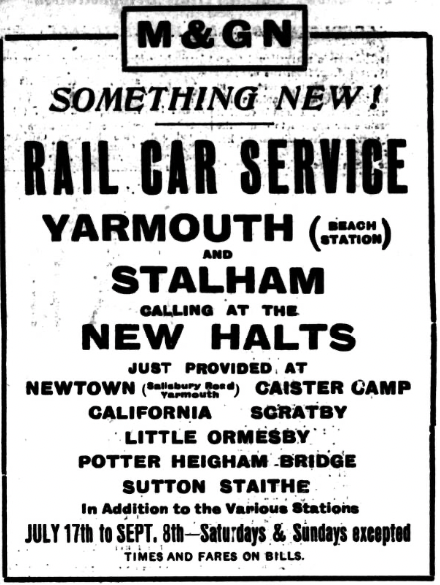
Advertisement from the Yarmouth Independent on Saturday 15 July 1933

The station was opened by the Midland and Great Northern Joint Railway in 1933 to serve the increasing numbers of holidaymakers who were visiting the Norfolk Broads and coastal beaches within reach of the village of Sutton. This attempt to increase revenue on the line was, however, short-lived possibly due to its location on the northern extremity of the Broads. The single station platform was very basic in design, consisting of no more than a few sleepers at ground level, with passengers alighting with the aid of a set of retractable steps leading down from the Sentinel Railcar which called at the tourist halts on the line.

Preceding station	Disused railways	Following station
Stalham	Midland and Great Northern; Yarmouth Line	Catfield
