= Tracey Moore =

Tracey Moore may refer to:

- Tracey Moore (actress) (born 1960), Canadian voice actress and director
- Tracey Moore (cricketer) (1941–2018), English cricketer

== See also ==
- Tracy Moore (disambiguation)
