= Horsey Mere =

Lake in Norfolk, England

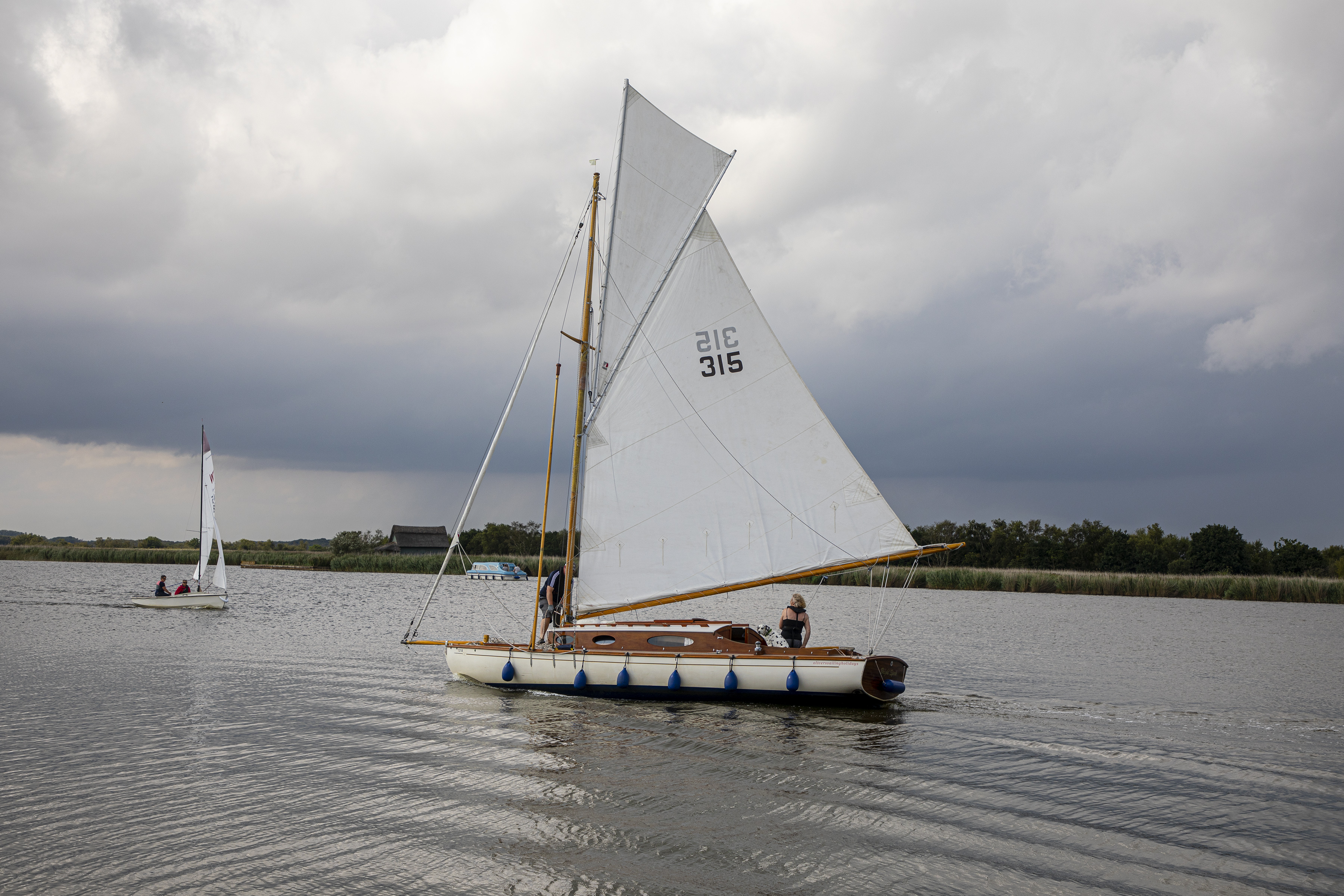
- Yachts on Horsey Mere

- Location within Norfolk
- Location: Norfolk Broads
- Coordinates: 52.74190°N 1.62672°E
- Catchment area: 82 hectares (200 acres)
- Basin countries: United Kingdom
- Surface area: 33 hectares (82 acres)
- Max. depth: 1.5 metres (4 ft 11 in)
- Water volume: 491,313 cubic metres (17,350,600 cu ft)
- Surface elevation: 1.1 metres (3 ft 7 in)

Horsey Mere is one of the Norfolk Broads in the east of England; it is one of the more northerly broads close to the North Sea coast.

It is reached by Hickling Broad and the River Thurne. The nearest settlements are Horsey and West Somerton.

Horsey Mere is part of Upper Thurne Broads and Marshes, a Site of Special Scientific Interest. The mere is owned by the National Trust, as is Horsey Windpump.

The mere has a catchment area of 82 hectares (200 acres), a maximum depth of 1.5 metres (4 ft 11 in), and a surface area of 33 hectares (82 acres). The volume of water held in the mere is approximately 491,313 cubic metres (17,350,600 cu ft).

== Winter waterbirds refuge ==
Between the start of November and the end of February boat access on the mere is limited to navigation between the end of Meadow Dyke and the Staithe.

== Gallery ==
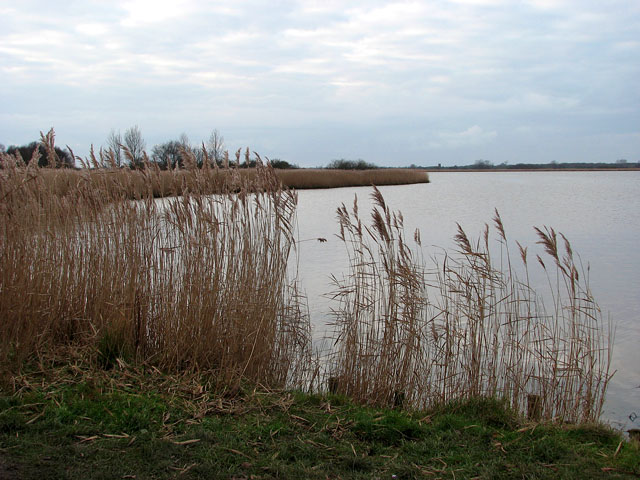

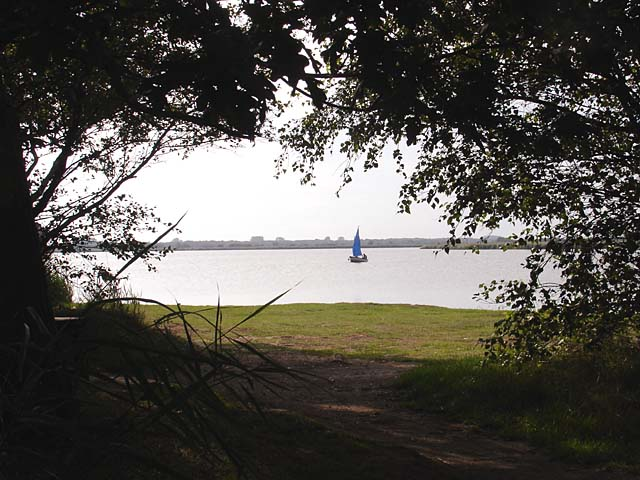

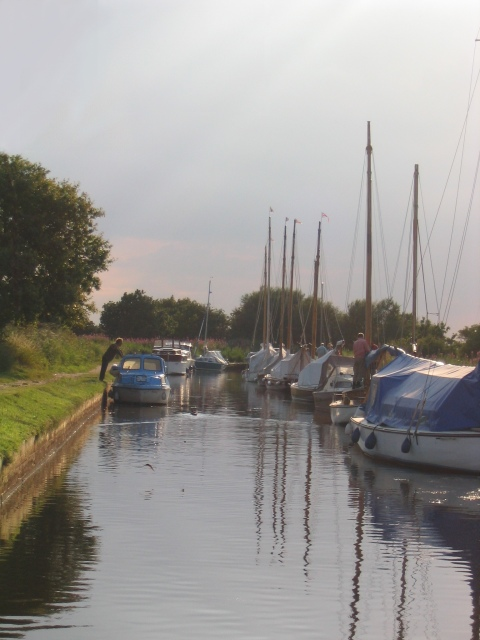

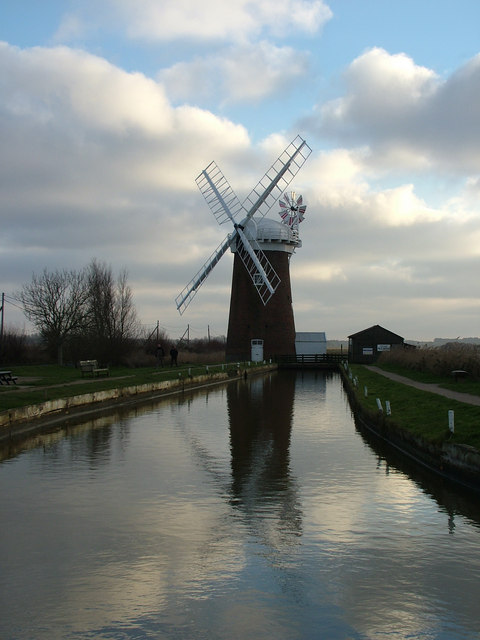

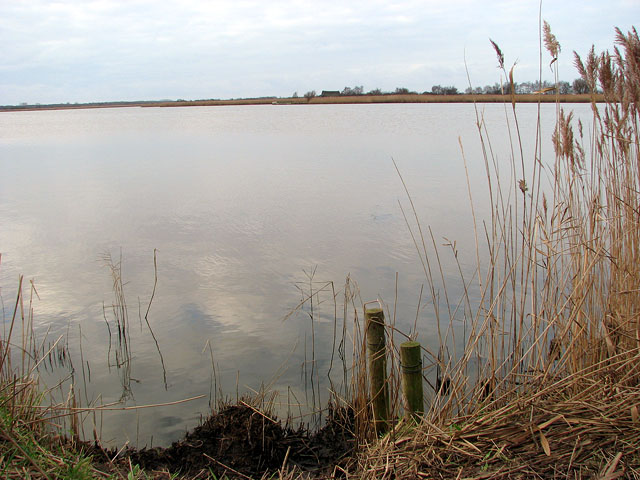
