= Potter Heigham railway station =

Former railway station in Norfolk, England

Coordinates: 52.7163°N 1.5748°E

Potter Heigham
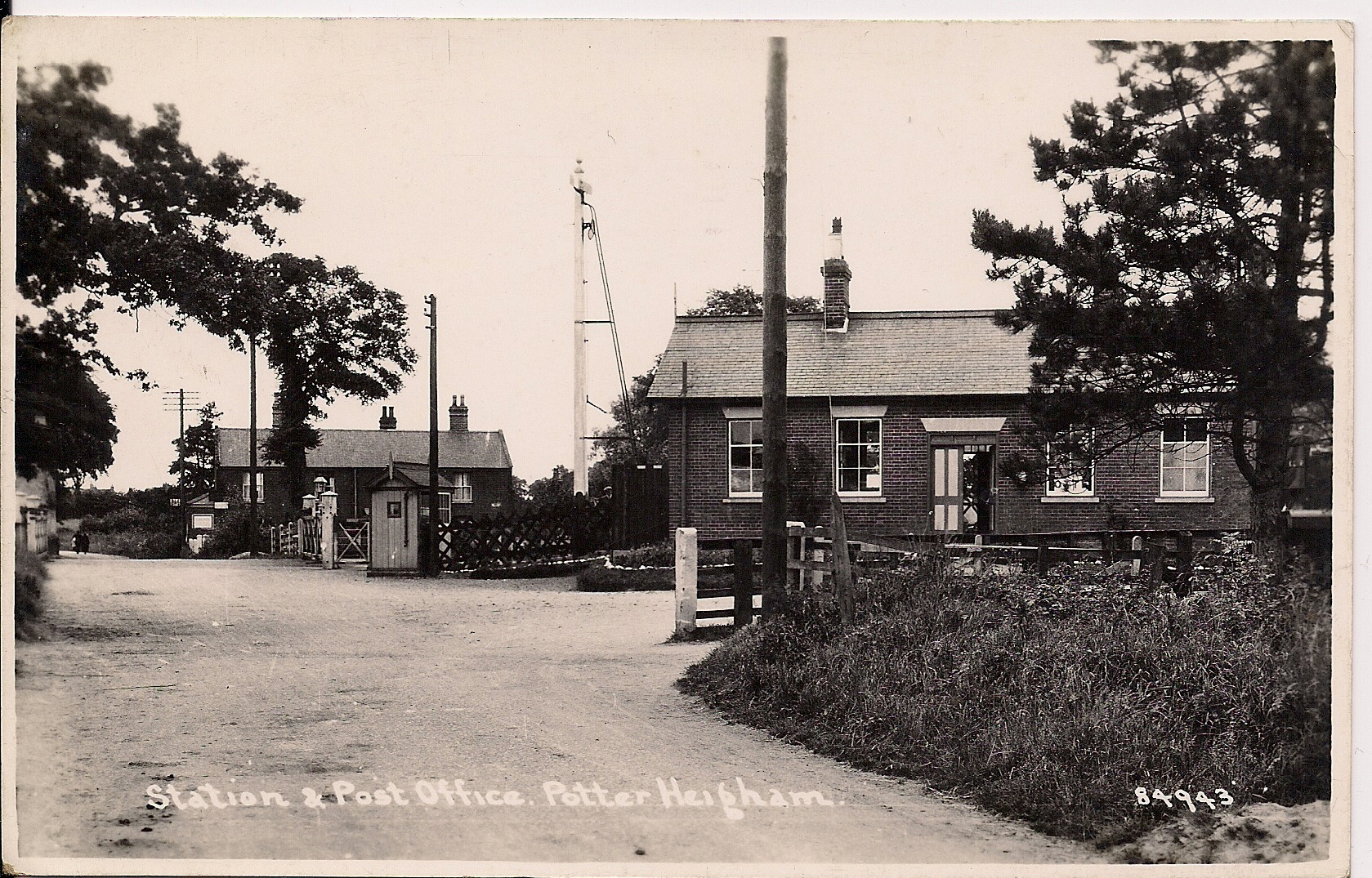

General information
- Location: Potter Heigham, North Norfolk; England
- Grid reference: TG415190
- Platforms: 2

Other information
- Status: Disused

History
- Pre-grouping: Yarmouth & North Norfolk Railway; Midland and Great Northern Joint Railway
- Post-grouping: Midland and Great Northern Joint Railway; Eastern Region of British Railways

Key dates
- 17 January 1880: Opened
- 2 March 1959: Closed
Location

Potter Heigham railway station was a railway station in Norfolk. It was on the line between Melton Constable and Great Yarmouth. It closed in 1959. In 2015, the platform wall, some of the stations buildings and an old signal being used by Richardson's dry dock were still in situ. You can trace the old line a good few miles to Stalham.

Former services

Preceding station	Disused railways	Following station
Catfield	Midland and Great Northern; Yarmouth Line	Potter Heigham Bridge Halt
