= Shallam Dyke Marshes, Thurne =

UK Site of Special Scientific Interest

Coordinates: 52.694°N 1.550°E

- Site of Special Scientific Interest
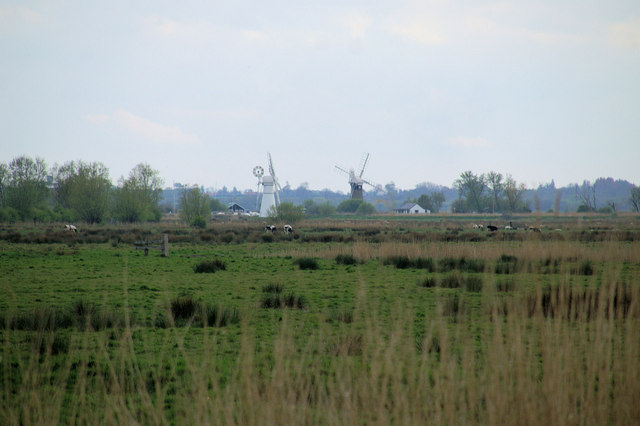
- Location of Shallam Dyke Marshes, Thurne.
- Area of search: Norfolk
- Grid reference: TG 400 166
- Interest: Biological
- Area: 69.8 hectares (172 acres)
- Notification date: 1986
- Location map: Magic Map

Shallam Dyke Marshes, Thurne is a 69.8-hectare (172-acre) biological Site of Special Scientific Interest south-east of Norwich in Norfolk, England. It is part of the Broadland Ramsar site and Special Protection Area, and The Broads Special Area of Conservation.

This is grazing marsh in the valley of the River Thurne, and it is important for waders such as lapwings, oystercatchers and snipe. There are a variety of water plants such as the rare water soldier.
