= Hemsby railway station =

Former railway station in Norfolk, England

Coordinates: 52.6972°N 1.6916°E

Hemsby
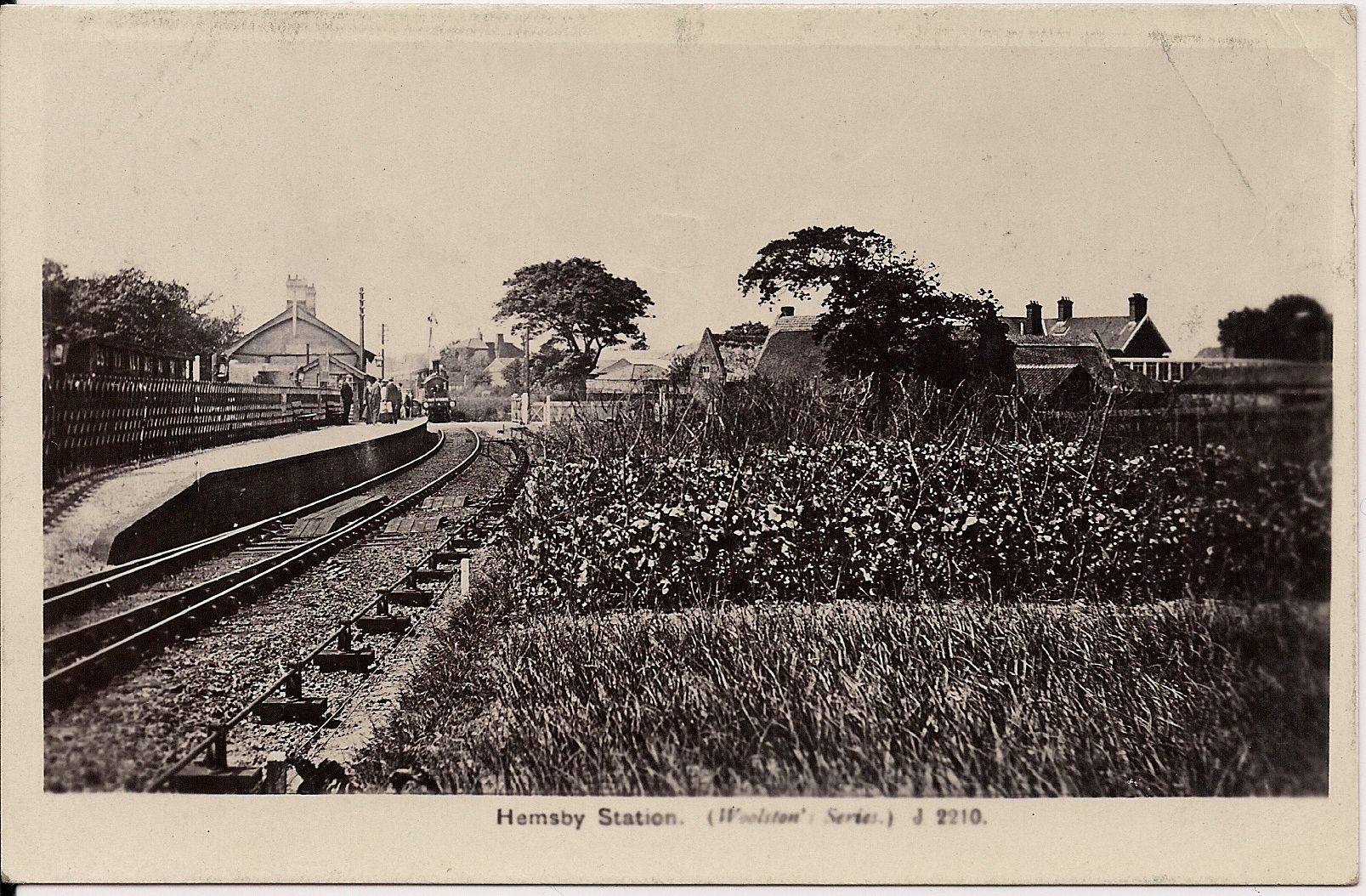

General information
- Location: Hemsby, Great Yarmouth; England
- Grid reference: TG495173
- Platforms: 1

Other information
- Status: Disused

History
- Pre-grouping: Great Yarmouth & Stalham Light Railway; Midland and Great Northern Joint Railway
- Post-grouping: Midland and Great Northern Joint Railway; Eastern Region of British Railways

Key dates
- 16 May 1878: Opened
- 2 March 1959: Closed
Location

Hemsby railway station was a station in Hemsby, Norfolk. It was on the line between Melton Constable and Great Yarmouth. It was closed in 1959.

Preceding station	Disused railways	Following station
Martham	Midland and Great Northern; Yarmouth Line	Great Ormesby
