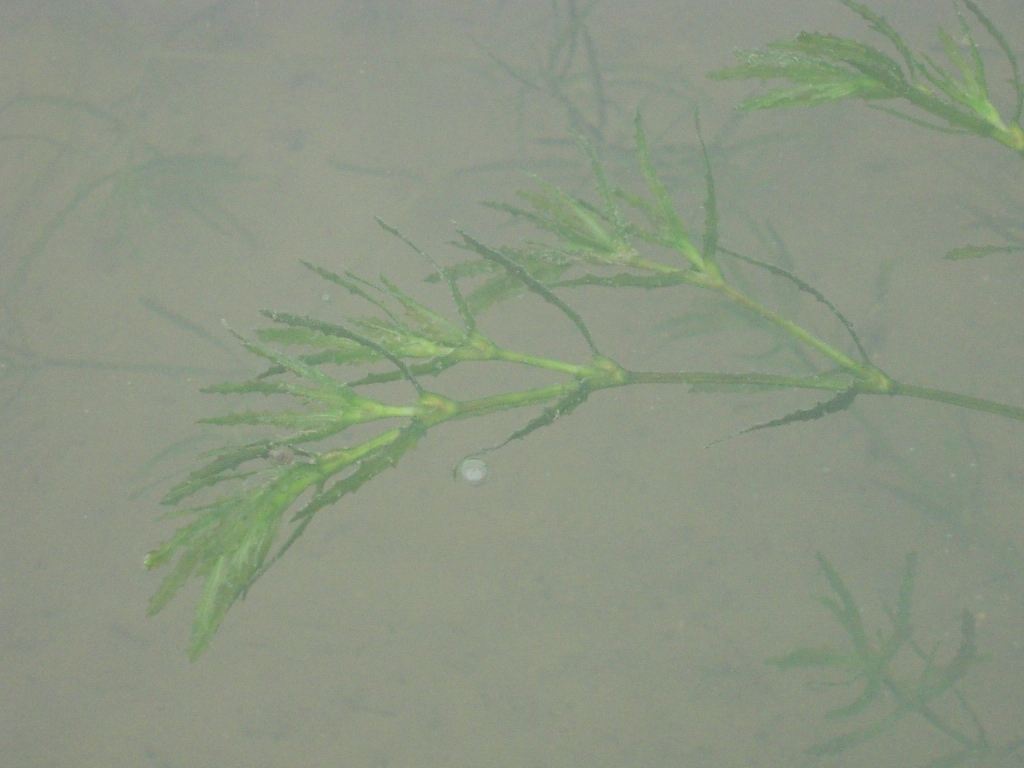

Conservation status
- Least Concern (IUCN 3.1)

Scientific classification
- Kingdom: Plantae
- Clade: Tracheophytes
- Clade: Angiosperms
- Clade: Monocots
- Order: Alismatales
- Family: Hydrocharitaceae
- Genus: Najas
- Species: N. marina

Binomial name
- Najas marina L.

Synonyms
- Ittnera major (All.) C.C.Gmel.; Ittnera najas C.C.Gmel.; Najas fluviatilis Poir.; Najas fucoides Griff.; Najas gracilis (Morong) Small; Najas laevis Lojac.; Najas latifolia A.Braun; Najas major All.; Najas maritima Pall.; Najas microcarpa (A.Braun) Bolle ex Christ; Najas monosperma Willd.; Najas muricata Thuill.; Najas polonica Zalewski; Najas tetrasperma Willd.

= Najas marina =

Species of aquatic plant

Najas marina is a species of aquatic plant known by the common names spiny water nymph, spiny naiad and holly-leaved naiad. It is an extremely widespread species, reported across Europe, Asia, Africa, Australia, the Americas and many oceanic islands. It can be found in many types of freshwater and brackish aquatic habitat, including bodies of alkaline water.

== Description ==
Najas marina is an annual producing a slender, branching stem up to 40 or 45 centimeters in maximum length. The evenly spaced leaves are up to 4 centimeters long, 1 to 3 millimeters wide, and edged in tiny sawlike teeth. The leaf has prickles along its midvein. Minute stalkless, green flowers occur in the leaf axils. The plant is dioecious, with male and female flower types occurring on separate individuals. In the British Isles it is possible that only female plants occur. It flowers in mid-summer.

== Varieties and subspecies ==
A long list of varietal and subspecific names have been proposed over the years. At present, only nine are widely accepted:

- Najas marina subsp. arsenariensis (Maire) L.Triest - Algeria
- Najas marina var. brachycarpa Trautv. - China and Kazakhstan
- Najas marina subsp. commersonii L.Triest - Madagascar, Mauritius, Réunion
- Najas marina var. grossidentata Rendle - Korea and Manchuria
- Najas marina var. intermedia (Wolfg. ex Gorski) Rendle - Spain, Sicily, Africa, the Middle East, China, Sri Lanka
- Najas marina var. marina
- Najas marina subsp. marina
- Najas marina subsp. sumatrana (W.J.de Wilde) L.Triest - Sumatra
- Najas marina var. zollingeri Rendle - Bali

== Distribution and habitat ==
Najas marina has a wide, almost circumglobal distribution in temperate and tropical regions. It occurs in mesoeutrophic water over deep peat or mud. It was first recorded in the British Isles in 1883 at Hickling Broad in Norfolk where it had become established. Populations declined in the 1960s because of pollution, but action has been taken to reduce the level of nutrients in the Norfolk Broads and the water quality has improved.

== Fossil record ==
One fossil seed of Najas marina has been extracted from borehole samples of the Middle Miocene fresh water deposits in Nowy Sacz Basin, West Carpathians, Poland.
