= Heigham Holmes =

Nature reserve in Norfolk, England

Coordinates: 52.726572°N 1.616707°E

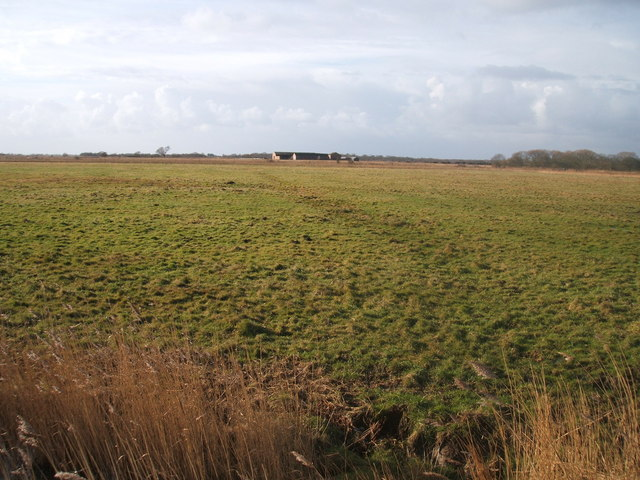
A view to the old barns in the centre of Heigham Holmes

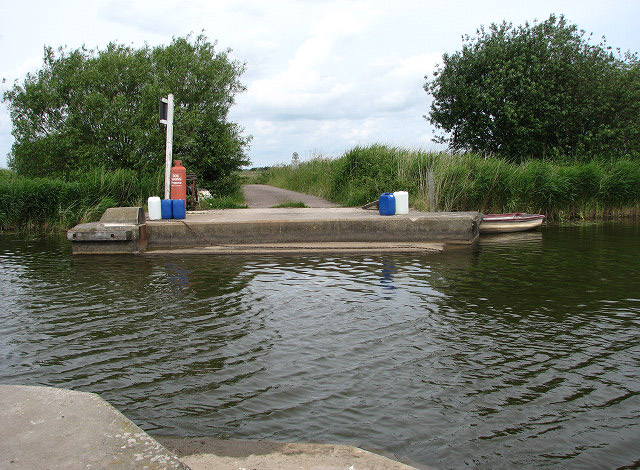
The site of the floating bridge that gives access to Heigham Holmes, looking towards the reserve

Heigham Holmes is a national nature reserve located within the Norfolk Broads in the English county of Norfolk. The reserve is, in effect, an island, being surrounded by the river channels, drainage ditches and wetland areas of the Broads. It is only accessible by an unusual floating swing bridge across the River Thurne from the village of Martham.

== Correct pronunciation ==
"Hayum"

== Ownership ==
The reserve is owned by the National Trust and is within the Broads National Park and the civil parish of Potter Heigham. It is only opened to the public for one day a year.

== Other information ==
It has been suggested that Heigham Holmes was used by the Special Operations Executive as a secret airfield between 1940 and 1944, with Lysander aircraft operating from the airfield to ferry agents to occupied Europe. However, no evidence of an airfield has been found in any records (military or local), maps or on aerial photographs, and any military-type structures that may have existed would appear to have been removed by the end of the Second World War, therefore any such usage cannot be confirmed.

The subject of an airfield having existed in Heigham Holmes was featured erroneously in the BBC's Secret Britain television series, first broadcast in 2010.
