= Potter Heigham =

Village in Norfolk, England

Coordinates: 52.71741°N 1.57432°E

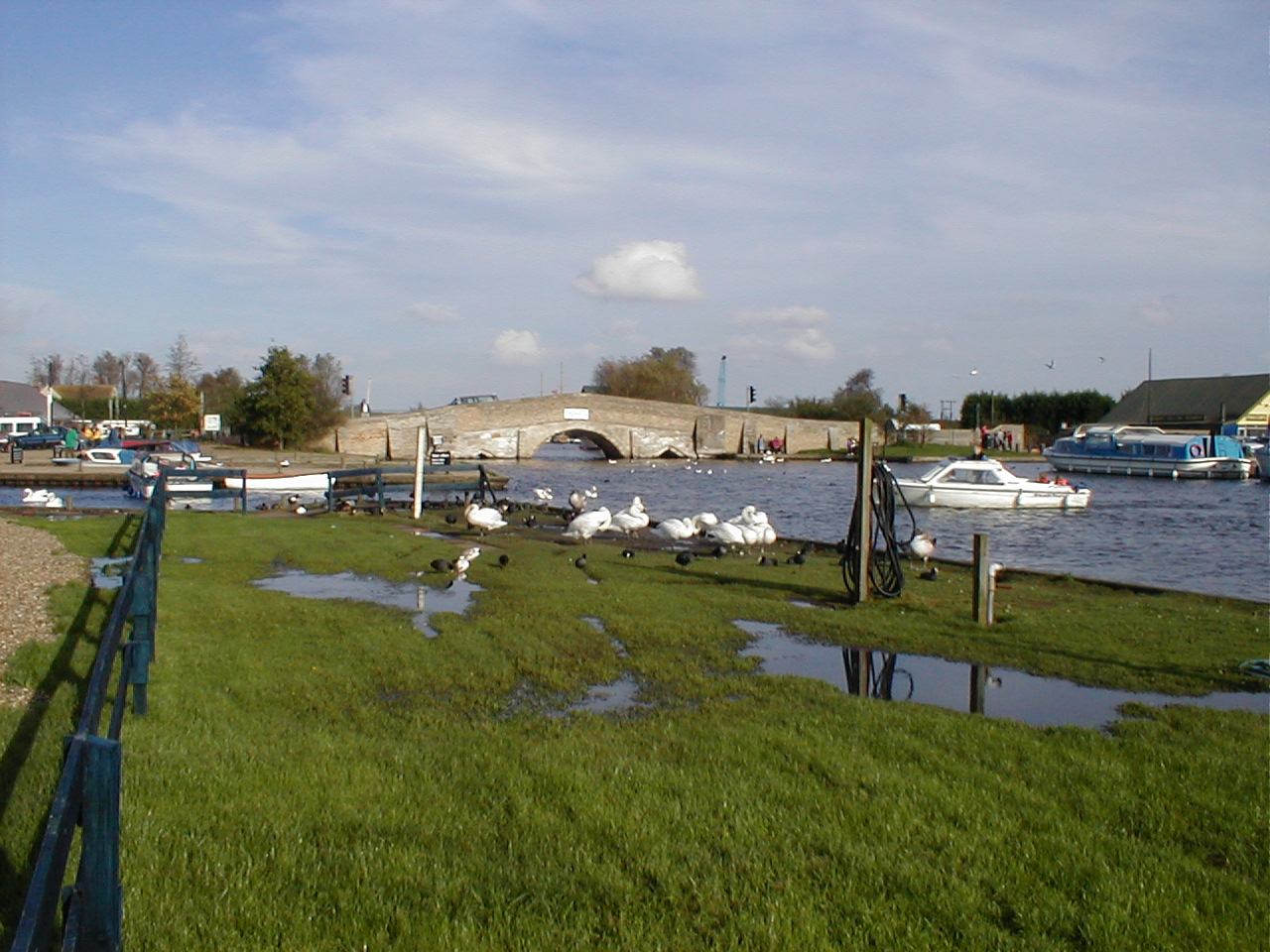
- Potter Heigham's medieval bridge

- Location within Norfolk
- Area: 10.38 km^{2} (4.01 sq mi)
- Population: 1,043 (2011)
  - Density: 100/km^{2} (260/sq mi)
- OS grid reference: TG415193
- Civil parish: Potter Heigham
- District: North Norfolk
- Shire county: Norfolk
- Region: East
- Country: England
- Sovereign state: United Kingdom
- Post town: GREAT YARMOUTH
- Postcode district: NR29
- Dialling code: 01692
- Police: Norfolk
- Fire: Norfolk
- Ambulance: East of England
- UK Parliament: North Norfolk

Potter Heigham is a village and civil parish on the River Thurne in the English county of Norfolk. It is situated 12 mi (19 km) north-east of the city of Norwich on the A149 road, and within the Broads National Park.

The village is known for its medieval bridge and the Church of St Nicholas. There are two national nature reserves within the parish; the Ludham - Potter Heigham NNR is to the west of the village whilst the Heigham Holmes NNR is to the east. The Weavers' Way, a long distance footpath, also passes through the village on its way from Cromer to Great Yarmouth.

== History ==
The village's name means 'Hatch homestead/village' or perhaps, 'hedge homestead/village'. There is evidence for Romano-British pottery industry here hence the 'Potter' addition.

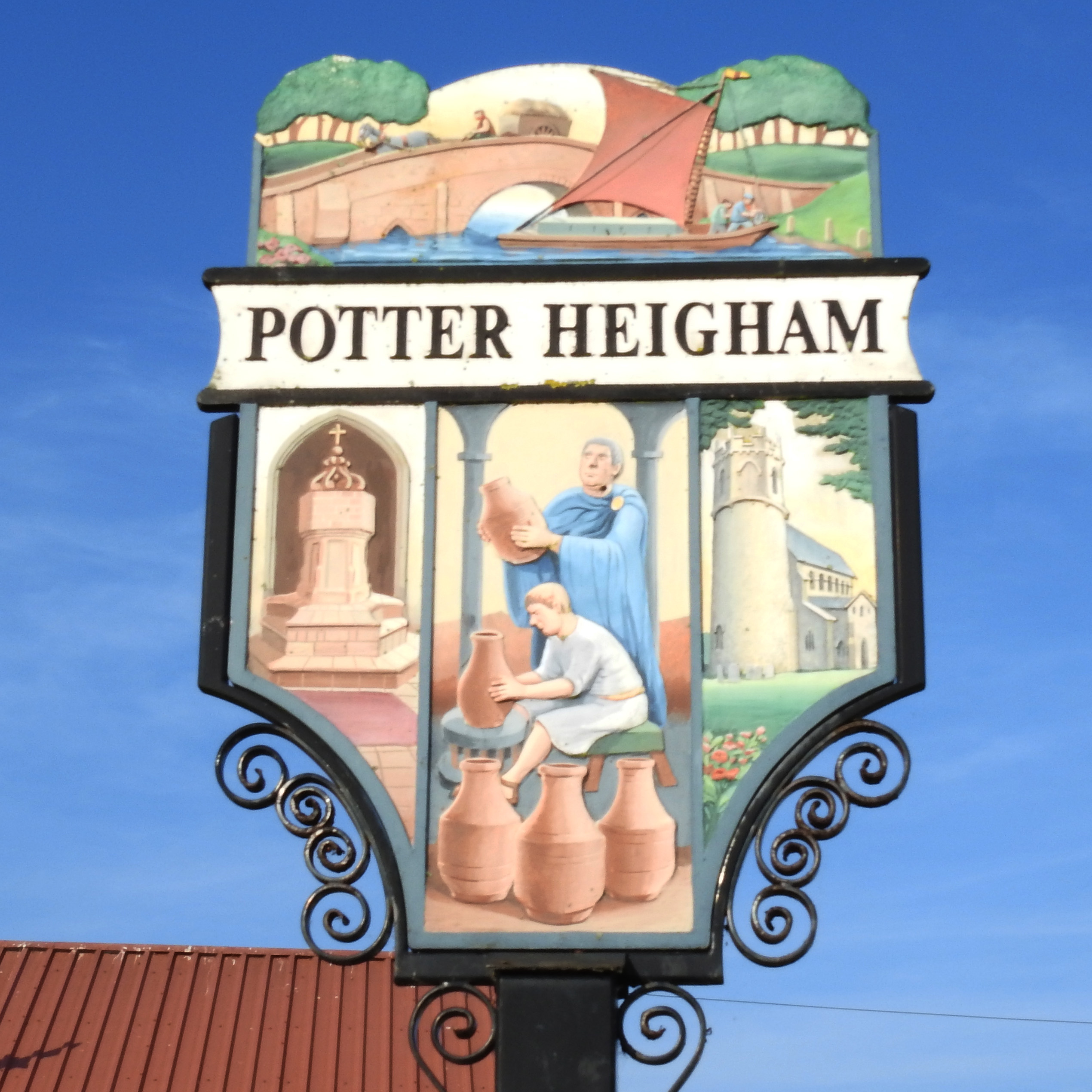
Potter Heigham's village sign, illustrating its connection with historical artefacts of pottery found in the area

The parish of Potter Heigham (pronounced locally as Ham) has a number of features related to the World Wars. Hickling Broad, to the north of the parish, was used as a seaplane base during World War I. Part of Ludham Airstrip, a now shrunken remnant of a larger World War II airbase, is also built on parish lands, and there were a number of defensive structures around the medieval bridge.

The Museum of the Broads was opened in Potter Heigham in 1996, and moved to its current location at the Poor's Staithe in Stalham in 1999.

== Government ==
The civil parish has an area of 10.38 km^{2} (4.01 sq mi) and in the 2001 census had a population of 961 in 425 households, the population increasing to 1,043 at the 2011 Census. For the purposes of local government, the parish falls within the district of North Norfolk and the county of Norfolk.

As in other broadland villages, the areas adjacent to the river fall under the administration of the Broads Authority.

== Main sights ==
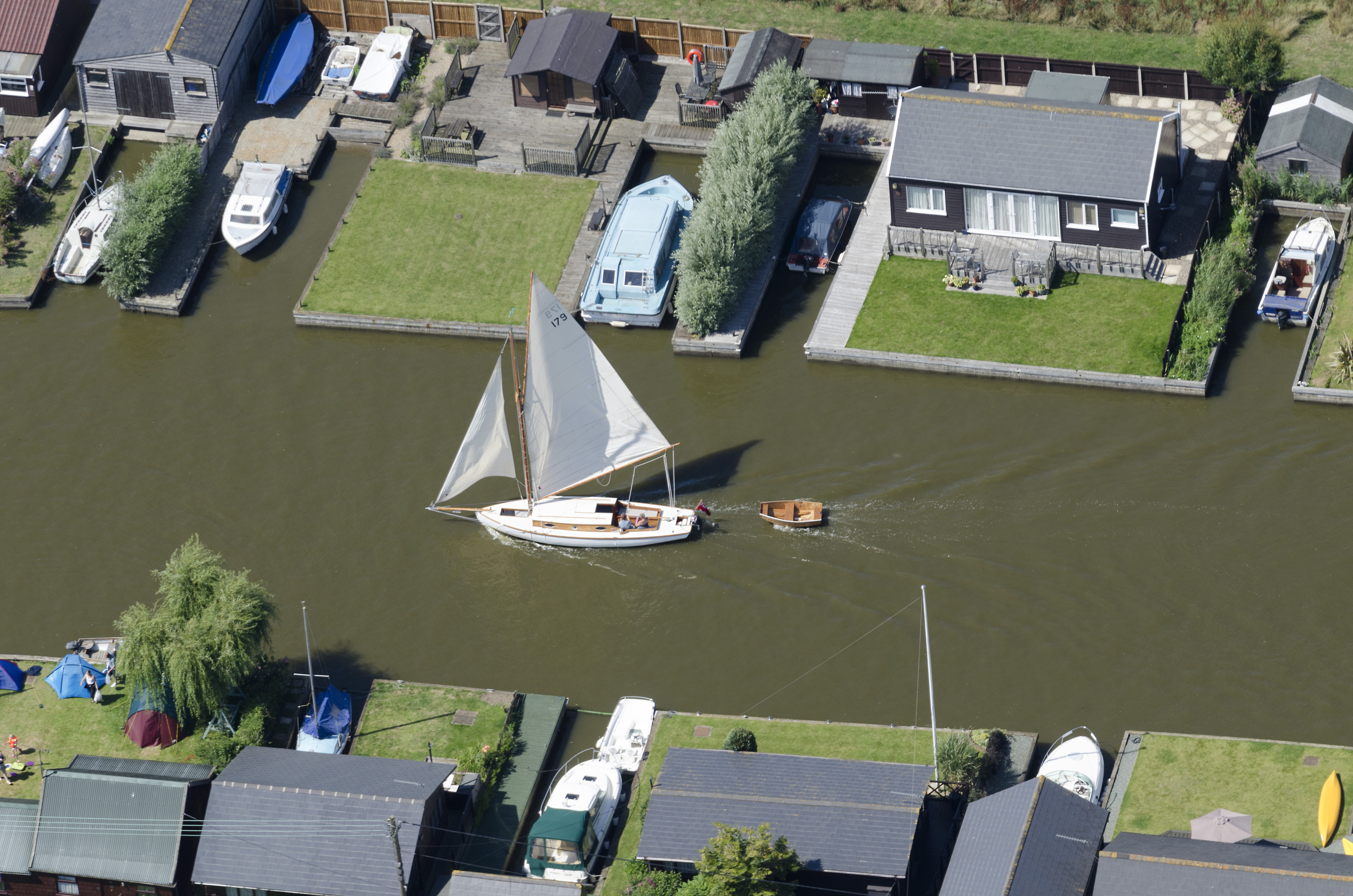
Sailing on the Thurne through Potter Heigham

Apart from the church of St Nicholas and the medieval bridge, Potter Heigham has a number of buildings of historic or architectural note. These include the Heigham Holmes windpump to the east of the parish, High's mill on the River Thurne, and Sunways corn mill, all of which are listed buildings. The village is home to Lathams of Potter Heigham, a department store opened in 1964, but now owned by the QD Stores group.

=== Church of St Nicholas ===
Church of St Nicholas

Potter Heigham church is dedicated to St Nicholas, the patron saint of fishermen and children. The earliest surviving feature is the round tower, which dates from the 12th century and has a 14th-century octagonal extension, one of the best preserved in the country.

It is famed for its hammerbeam roof and the almost unique 15th-century brick font. The church also contains a scheme of wall paintings dating from the 14th century, the most readable of which depicts the Seven Works of Mercy. When the roof was re-thatched it required about 1850 bundles of reed. It is one of 124 existing round-tower churches in Norfolk. The church is a Grade I listed building.

=== Potter Heigham Bridge ===
Potter Heigham Bridge is a medieval bridge, believed to date from 1385, famous for being the most difficult to navigate in the Broads. The bridge opening is so narrow that only small cruisers can pass through it, and then only at low water, usually with the help of resident pilots at Phoenix Fleet boatyard next to the Bridge - there is a fee of £20 - £10 each way for holiday craft in the summer. Hire boats from the main agencies pay 50%, i.e. £10 for both trips. A modern roadbridge is close by.

== Folklore ==
A tale is told that in 1742 Lady Carew and her daughter Evelyn were taken away on Evelyn's wedding day by a phantom coach driven by skeletons. The coach reportedly caught alight as it crossed Potter Heigham bridge. It is also said that the ghost of a drummer boy skates across the Broad during the month of February.

== Notable people ==
- The Norfolk humorist Sidney Grapes lived and worked in Potter Heigham. He was famous for his collection of Norfolk dialect letters entitled The Boy John Letters, which were originally published in the Eastern Daily Press.
- Arthur Ransome set his books Coot Club and The Big Six in the Norfolk Broads, and Potter Heigham features as a location in both.
- Folk singer Harry Cox lived and worked in Potter Heigham and the surrounding villages. He is buried in St Nicholas churchyard (his grave is unmarked as of August 2026).

== Notes ==
http://kepn.nottingham.ac.uk/map/place/Norfolk/Potter%20Heigham
