= Two pound coin =

British coin denominating two pounds sterling

Two pounds
- United Kingdom
- Value: £2.00 pound sterling
- Mass: 12 g
- Diameter: 28.4 mm
- Thickness: 2.5 mm
- Edge: Milled, with an inscription
- Composition: Outer ring: Nickel-brass (76% Cu, 20% Zn and 4% Ni); Centre: Cupro-nickel (75% Cu, 25% Ni)
- Years of minting: 1997–present

Obverse
- Design: Elizabeth II
- Designer: Jody Clark
- Design date: 2015

Reverse
- Design: Britannia
- Designer: Antony Dufort
- Design date: 2015

The British two pound coin (£2) is a denomination of modern British coinage that is worth two pounds sterling. Its obverse featured the profile of Queen Elizabeth II from the coin’s release until 2023, when King Charles III replaced her. Three different portraits of the Queen have been used, with the most recent design by Jody Clark being introduced in 2015. The reverse design features Britannia.

The coin was released on 15 June 1998 (coins minted 1997) after a review of the United Kingdom's coinage decided that a general-circulation £2 coin was needed. The new bi-metallic coin design replaced a series of commemorative, uni-metallic coins which were issued between 1986 and 1996 to celebrate special occasions. Although legal tender, those earlier coins had never been common in everyday circulation.

Two pound coins are legal tender to any amount when offered in repayment of a debt; however, the coin's legal tender status is not normally relevant for everyday transactions. As of March 2014, there were an estimated 417 million £2 coins in circulation with an estimated face value of £834 million.

Beyond the usual commemorative versions, no standard two pound coins were minted for general circulation between 2017 and 2020, although examples have been issued in uncirculated sets at a premium. This was because the concurrent introduction of the new version of the one pound coin had put enough £2 (and 20 pence) coins back into circulation, as people emptied coin jars primarily for the older one pound coin that was due to be withdrawn.. Minting of the Britannia coin resumed again in 2021.

== Design ==
The original reverse design, by Bruce Rushin

The original reverse of the coin, designed by Bruce Rushin, is an abstract design symbolising the history of technological achievement, accompanied by the words TWO POUNDS above, and the year of minting below. This was the first bi-metallic coin to be produced for circulation in Britain since the tin farthing with a copper plug produced in 1692, and is the highest-denomination coin in common circulation in the UK. The coin consists of an outer yellow metal nickel-brass ring made from 76% copper, 20% zinc, and 4% nickel, and an inner steel-coloured cupro-nickel disc made from 75% copper, 25% nickel. The coin weighs 12 grams (0.42 oz) and is 2.84 centimetres (1.12 in) in diameter.

The design itself was first tried out in 1994 when the Royal Mint produced a short run of demonstration pieces to the new bi-metal standard. These pieces were not for circulation and were simply intended to test the manufacturing process. The coin was technically similar to the version which eventually entered circulation with the Maklouf effigy of Queen Elizabeth II on the obverse and the image of a sailing ship similar to that previously used on the reverse of the pre-decimal halfpenny piece. The inscription on the reverse read ROYAL MINT TRIAL 1994 with an edge inscription based on the one pound coin which read DECUS ET TUTAMEN ANNO REGNI XLVI, meaning "An ornament and a safeguard – [in the] 46th year of [her] reign". The 1994 pieces were never legal tender but were eventually released for sale as part of a presentation set in 1998. At the same time in 1994 the Royal Mint produced a mono-metallic trial two-pound coin, with the same ship reverse and inscription, but otherwise similar to the earlier commemorative coins. These were never issued in presentation sets, and so are much scarcer than the bi-metallic version.

Because of technical difficulties, the 1997-dated coins, which bear the effigy of Queen Elizabeth II by Raphael Maklouf, were not released to circulation until June 1998 (the same time as the 1998-dated coins). Coins dated 1998 and later bear the effigy of the Queen by Ian Rank-Broadley. The Maklouf-effigy coins bear the inscription ELIZABETH II DEI GRATIA REGINA F D (Note: For a details of inscriptions, see British coinage) on the obverse; the Rank-Broadley coins bear the inscription ELIZABETH II DEI GRA REG FID DEF.

The reverse of the regular-issue coin, designed by Bruce Rushin, bears a concentric design symbolically representing technological development from the Iron Age, through the Industrial Revolution and the Electronic Age to the Internet, with the inscription TWO POUNDS above the design and the date below. An oddity of the design is that it depicts nineteen interlocking gears. Because it is an odd number of gears, the mechanism could not actually turn. The coin has the edge inscription STANDING ON THE SHOULDERS OF GIANTS, a quote taken from a letter by Isaac Newton to Robert Hooke, in which he describes how his work was built on the knowledge of those that had gone before him. "If I have seen further, it is by standing on the shoulders of giants." Newton was Warden and later Master of the Royal Mint.

In February 2015, the Royal Mint announced that a new design featuring Britannia by Antony Dufort would replace the previous design. The new coins feature the edge inscription QUATUOR MARIA VINDICO, meaning "I claim the four seas", an inscription previously featured on coins bearing the image of Britannia.

In October 2023 the King Charles III two-pound coin was presented; the coin features the national flowers – a rose for England, a daffodil for Wales, a thistle for Scotland and a shamrock for Northern Ireland. The coin has the edge inscription IN SERVITIO OMNIUM ("In the service of all"), taken from the King's inaugural speech in September 2022.

== Variants ==
In addition to the standard designs there have been several variant reverse designs used on the £2 coin to commemorate important events. These are summarised in the table below.

Uni-metallic coins
Year	Event	Design	Edge inscription	Designer	Mintage
1986	XIII Commonwealth Games	Cross of St Andrew, crown of laurel leaves and Scottish Thistle	XIII COMMONWEALTH GAMES SCOTLAND 1986	Norman Sillman	8,212,184
1989	Tercentenary of the Bill of Rights	Cypher of 'W&M' (King William and Queen Mary) interlaced surmounting a horizontal Parliamentary Mace and representation of the Royal Crown above and the dates 1689 and 1989 below, all within the inscription 'Tercentenary of the Bill of Rights'	None (milled)	John Lobban	4,392,825
1989	Tercentenary of the Claim of Right	Cypher of 'W&M' (King William and Queen Mary) interlaced surmounting a horizontal Parliamentary Mace and representation of the Royal Crown above and the dates 1689 and 1989 below, all within the inscription 'Tercentenary of the Claim of Right'	None (milled)	John Lobban	381,400
1994	Tercentenary of the Bank of England	The Bank's Corporate Seal including the Crown and Cypher of King William and Queen Mary and the dates 1694–1994	SIC VOS NON VOBIS (Translation > "Thus we do, but not for ourselves")	Leslie Durbin	1,443,116
1995	50th Anniversary of the end of the Second World War	A stylised representation of a Dove as the symbol of peace	1945 IN PEACE GOODWILL 1995	John Mills	4,394,566
1995	50th Anniversary of the founding of the United Nations	50th anniversary symbol of United Nations and a fanning pattern of flags with the inscription NATIONS UNITED FOR PEACE above and the dates '1945–1995' below	None (milled)	Michael Rizzello	1,668,575
1996	10th European Football Championship	A stylised representation of a football, with the date of 1996 centrally placed and encircled by sixteen small rings	TENTH EUROPEAN CHAMPIONSHIP	John Mills	5,141,350

Bi-metallic coins (images: )
Year	Event	Design	Edge inscription	Designer	Mintage
1999	1999 Rugby World Cup	Design depicts a stadium, on which is superimposed a rugby ball and goalpost. The date '1999' above separated by goal-posts from the value 'TWO POUNDS' below	RUGBY WORLD CUP 1999	Ron Dutton	4,933,000
2001	100th Anniversary of Marconi's 1st Wireless Transmission across the Atlantic	Radio waves decorating centre and outer border while a spark of electricity linking the zeros of the date represents the generation of the signal	WIRELESS BRIDGES THE ATLANTIC...MARCONI 1901...	Robert Evans	4,558,000
2002	XVII Commonwealth Games in Manchester (England)	Stylised figure of an athlete holding a banner and the inscription XVII Commonwealth Games 2002. This variant contains the flag of England featured beside the athlete	SPIRIT OF FRIENDSHIP, MANCHESTER 2002	Matthew Bonaccorsi	650,500
2002	XVII Commonwealth Games in Manchester (Scotland)	Stylised figure of an athlete holding a banner and the inscription XVII Commonwealth Games 2002. This variant contains the flag of Scotland featured beside the athlete	SPIRIT OF FRIENDSHIP, MANCHESTER 2002	Matthew Bonaccorsi	771,750
2002	XVII Commonwealth Games in Manchester (Wales)	Stylised figure of an athlete holding a banner and the inscription XVII Commonwealth Games 2002. This variant contains the flag of Wales featured beside the athlete	SPIRIT OF FRIENDSHIP, MANCHESTER 2002	Matthew Bonaccorsi	588,500
2002	XVII Commonwealth Games in Manchester (Northern Ireland)	Stylised figure of an athlete holding a banner and the inscription XVII Commonwealth Games 2002. This variant contains the Ulster Banner featured beside the athlete	SPIRIT OF FRIENDSHIP, MANCHESTER 2002	Matthew Bonaccorsi	485,500
2003	50th Anniversary of the discovery of DNA	A representation of the double helical structure of DNA with the words DNA Double Helix above and 'TWO POUNDS' and the dates '1953–2003' below	DEOXYRIBONUCLEIC ACID	John Mills	4,299,000
2004	200th Anniversary of the first steam locomotive by Richard Trevithick	A representation of a steam locomotive engine with the words 'TWO POUNDS' above and inside a cog wheel, the words R.TREVITHICK 1804 INVENTION INDUSTRY PROGRESS 2004 as a circumscription	None (milled with an incuse railway line motif)	Robert Lowe	5,004,500
2005	400th anniversary of the Gunpowder Plot	An arrangement of crossiers, maces and swords surrounded by stars and the dates 1605 & 2005. Denomination TWO POUNDS below	REMEMBER REMEMBER THE FIFTH OF NOVEMBER	Peter Forster	5,140,500
2005	60th anniversary of Victory in Europe Day	Design depicts St Paul's Cathedral illuminated by searchlights and the value 'TWO POUNDS' sbove and the dates 1945–2005 below	IN VICTORY MAGNANIMITY IN PEACE GOODWILL	Bob Elderton	10,191,000
2006	Bicentennial of the birth of Isambard Kingdom Brunel	Depiction of a section of the roof of Paddington Station with the dates 2006 above and the name BRUNEL to the right and the denomination TWO POUNDS below	SO MANY IRONS IN THE FIRE	Robert Evans	7,452,250
2006	Bicentennial of the birth of Isambard Kingdom Brunel	A portrait of Isambard Kingdom Brunel with two of his engineering achievements, encircled by a chain with the denomination TWO POUNDS above and the date 2006 below	1806–1859 ISAMBARD KINGDOM BRUNEL ENGINEER	Rod Kelly	7,928,250
2007	Tercentenary of the Act of Union between England and Scotland	A design dividing the coin into four quarters, with a rose and a thistle occupying two of the quarters and a portcullis in each of the other two quarters. The whole design is overlaid with a linking jigsaw motif and surrounded by the dates "1707" and "2007", and the denomination "TWO POUNDS"	UNITED INTO ONE KINGDOM	Yvonne Holton	7,545,000
2007	Bicentenary of the Abolition of the Slave Trade in the British Empire	The date "1807" with the "0" depicted as a broken chain link, surrounded by the inscription "AN ACT FOR THE ABOLITION OF THE SLAVE TRADE" and the date "2007"	AM I NOT A MAN AND A BROTHER	David Gentleman	8,445,000
2008	Olympic Handover Ceremony	A flag showing the five Olympic rings being passed from a hand on the left to a hand on the right. The surrounding inscription reads "BEIJING 2008" left of image and "LONDON 2012" to right. The London 2012 olympic logo is at the bottom of the coin overlapping both metals	I CALL UPON THE YOUTH OF THE WORLD	The Royal Mint Engraving Team	918,000
2008	The Centenary of the London Olympic Games of 1908	Four lanes of a running track extend from bottom left and converge into distance towards top right. The lane numbers show "1908" across the lanes with "TWO POUNDS 2008" written along the lanes. The inscription "LONDON OLYMPIC CENTENARY" is shown around the upper right half of the coin	THE 4TH OLYMPIAD LONDON	Thomas T Docherty	910,000
2009	250th Anniversary of the birth of Robert Burns	A handwriting style of font reads [sic] "we'll tak a cup a' kindness yet, for auld lang syne". The inscription "1759 ROBERT BURNS 1796" above, "TWO POUNDS" below	SHOULD AULD ACQUAINTANCE BE FORGOT	The Royal Mint Engraving Team	3,253,000
2009	200th Anniversary of Charles Darwin's birth	A profile portrait of Charles Darwin on left, facing right, stares into the face of a chimpanzee on right, facing left. The inscription "1809 . DARWIN . 2009" above, "TWO POUNDS" below	ON THE ORIGIN OF SPECIES 1859	Suzie Zamit	3,903,000
2010	100th Anniversary of the death of Florence Nightingale	The design portrays a pulse being taken, whilst the background symbolises the rays of light from the lamp that Florence Nightingale was known for carrying during her rounds to tend to the wounded troops in the Crimean War. Surrounded by the inscription "1820 – FLORENCE NIGHTINGALE – 1910" with "TWO POUNDS" below	150 YEARS OF NURSING	Gordon Summers	6,175,000
2011	400th Anniversary of the King James Bible	The design features typeset in a replica of the black letter typeface used in the first edition: the reversed, raised text of the printing block on the left and the recessed text of the printed word on the right, taking the form of the quote, ‘In the beginning was the Word’ (John 1:1).’ Inscription "KING JAMES BIBLE" above, "1611–2011" below	THE AUTHORISED VERSION	Paul Stafford & Benjamin Wright	975,000
2011	500th Anniversary of the maiden voyage of the Mary Rose	The Mary Rose sailing right, based upon a 1546 pictorial survey of Henry VIII's navy. Inscription "THE MARY ROSE" above, "TWO POUNDS" below	YOUR NOBLEST SHIPPE 1511	John Bergdahl	1,040,000
2012	200th Anniversary of the birth of Charles Dickens	A profile outline of Charles Dickens, facing left, created from the titles of Dickens’ famous works. Inscription "1812 CHARLES DICKENS 1870" to left	SOMETHING WILL TURN UP	Matthew Dent	8,190,000
2012	The London 2012 Handover to Rio	The design depicts the moment of a baton handover in a relay race. The hand holding the baton descends from top right, above a sweeping UK flag which twists to become the flag of Brazil below the hand reaching up from bottom left to take the baton. Inscription "LONDON 2012" top left, "RIO 2016" bottom right. The London 2012 olympic logo is at the very top of the coin	I CALL UPON THE YOUTH OF THE WORLD	Jonathan Olliffe	845,000
2013	London Underground 150th Anniversary – The Train	The front of a tube train (1967 stock) fills the cupro-nickel centre of the coin as if approaching out of a tunnel formed by the surrounding nickel-brass outer ring of the coin. Inscription "1863 · LONDON UNDERGROUND · 2013" above	Linear representation of the Tube map	Edward Barber and Jay Osgerby	1,690,000
2013	London Underground 150th Anniversary – The Roundel	A representation of the London Underground logo with "1863" above and "2013" below	MIND THE GAP	Edwina Ellis	1,560,000
2013	The 350th Anniversary of the Guinea	A recreation of the design on what became known as the "spade guinea": a shield with the arms of King George III. Surrounding inscription "ANNIVERSARY OF THE GOLDEN GUINEA 2013"	WHAT IS A GUINEA? ‘TIS A SPLENDID THING (Stephen Kemble quotation)	Anthony Smith ARBS	2,990,000
2014	100th Anniversary of the Outbreak of the First World War	A representation of the famous recruitment poster featuring Lord Kitchener with the legend "YOUR COUNTRY NEEDS YOU". Surrounding inscription "THE FIRST WORLD WAR 1914–1918" with "2014" below	THE LAMPS ARE GOING OUT ALL OVER EUROPE	John Bergdahl	5,720,000
2014	500th Anniversary of Trinity House	The beacon of a lighthouse shining out to left and right. Surrounding inscription "1514 TRINITY HOUSE 2014" with "TWO POUNDS" below.	SERVING THE MARINER	Joe Whitlock-Blundell and David Eccles	3,705,000
2015	800th Anniversary of Magna Carta	King John is signing the Charter witnessed by a bishop and baron. Surrounding inscription "MAGNA CARTA" with "1215 - 2015" below	FOUNDATION OF LIBERTY	John Bergdahl	1,495,000
2015	The Royal Navy	Iron Duke-class battleship in profile with a lone seaplane on the starboard side and sea birds on the port side. Surrounding inscription "THE FIRST WORLD WAR 1914 - 1918" with "2015" below	THE SURE SHIELD OF BRITAIN	David Rowlands	650,000
2016	William Shakespeare	Comedy - Jester's hat and stick. Surrounding inscription "WILLIAM SHAKESPEARE" with "2016" below	ALL THE WORLD'S A STAGE	John Bergdahl	4,355,000
2016	William Shakespeare	History - crown with a dagger through the middle of the crown. Surrounding inscription "WILLIAM SHAKESPEARE" with "2016" below	THE HOLLOW CROWN (quote from Richard II)	John Bergdahl	5,655,000
2016	William Shakespeare	Tragedy - skull with a rose. Surrounding inscription "WILLIAM SHAKESPEARE" with "2016" below	WHAT A PIECE OF WORK IS A MAN	John Bergdahl	4,615,000
2016	The Army	Profile outline of three First World War soldiers. Surrounding inscription "THE FIRST WORLD WAR 1914-1918" with "2016" below	FOR KING AND COUNTRY	John Bergdahl	9,550,000
2016	The Great Fire of London	London burning, with boats on the River Thames in the foreground. Surrounding inscription "1666 THE GREAT FIRE OF LONDON 2016" with "TWO POUNDS" below	THE WHOLE CITY IN DREADFUL FLAMES	Aaron West	1,625,000

Non-circulating designs
Year	Event	Design	Edge inscription	Designer	Mintage
2017	Jane Austen	Silhouette of Jane Austen's head, overlaid by her signature.	THERE IS NO DOING WITHOUT MONEY (quote from Northanger Abbey)	Dominique Evans	0
2017	First World War Aviation	Royal Aircraft Factory R.E.8, carrying a pilot and his observer, taking reconnaissance photography over the Battle of Arras.	THE SKY RAINED HEROES	Dan Flashman	0
2018	100th Anniversary of the Royal Air Force	Badge of the Royal Air Force, surrounded by the inscription "THE 100TH ANNIVERSARY OF THE ROYAL AIR FORCE", with "1918-2018" below	PER ARDUA AD ASTRA (also present on reverse as part of badge)	Rhys Morgan	0
2018	The 100th Anniversary of the First World War Armistice	Inscription: "THE TRUTH UNTOLD THE PITY OF WAR", with surrounding inscription "THE FIRST WORLD WAR ARMISTICE 1918"	WILFRED OWEN KILLED IN ACTION 4 NOV 1918	Stephen Raw	0
2018	250th Anniversary of Captain Cook's Epic Voyage	The stern of HM Bark Endeavour, Captain Cook’s famous ship, leaving Plymouth with the ensign visible alongside 250 to mark the anniversary with Cook's signature below.	OCEANI INVESTIGATOR ACERRIMVS ("a keen explorer of the ocean")	Gary Breeze	0
2018	The 200th Anniversary of the publication of Frankenstein		A SPARK OF BEING	Thomas Docherty	0
2019	260th Anniversary of Wedgwood	Wedgwood vase. Surrounding inscription "WEDGWOOD" with "1759-2019" below	EVERYTHING GIVES WAY TO EXPERIMENT	Wedgwood Design Team	0
2019	350th Anniversary of the last diary entry of Samuel Pepys	Hand holding quill pen over sheet of paper with Pepys' signature and the date "MAY 31 1669". Surrounding inscription "SAMUEL PEPYS DIARIST" with "1669-2019" below	THE GOOD GOD PREPARE ME	Gary Breeze	0
2019	75th Anniversary of the D-Day Landings	Strategic Arrows pointing to the Utah, Omaha, Gold, Juno and Sword beaches of Normandy, with 2019 below	THE LONGEST DAY	Stephen Taylor	0
2019	250th Anniversary of Captain James Cook's Time in Tahiti	The middle half of HM Bark Endeavour, with inscription "1769 - 2019 CAPTAIN JAMES COOK" surrounding	OCEANI INVESTIGATOR ACERRIMVS	Gary Breeze	0
2020	400th Anniversary of the voyage of the Mayflower	The Titular Mayflower, with "MAYFLOWER 1620 - 2020" inscribed around	UNDERTAKEN FOR THE GLORY OF GOD	Chris Costello	0
2020	100th Anniversary of the Murder Mysteries of Agatha Christie	Puzzle Pieces, with "100 YEARS OF MYSTERY 1920 - 2020" inscribed around	LITTLE GREY CELLS	David Lawrence	0
2020	75th Anniversary of VE Day	A crowd celebrating, "VICTORY" in the background and "1945 - 2020 VICTORY IN EUROPE DAY" inscribed around	JUST TRIUMPH AND PROUD SORROW	Dominique Evans	0
2020	The 250th Anniversary of Captain James Cook's Voyage of Discovery	The front half of HM Bark Endeavour, with inscription "CAPTAIN JAMES COOK 1770 - 2020" surrounding	OCEANI INVESTIGATOR ACERRIMVS	Gary Breeze	0
2021	75th Anniversary of the death of H. G. Wells	Depictions of the Invisible Man and a Martian, surrounded by clock numerals, "2021 H.G.WELLS" inscribed below	GOOD BOOKS ARE THE WAREHOUSES OF IDEAS	Chris Costello	0
2021	250th Anniversary of the birth of Sir Walter Scott	Depiction of Sir Walter Scott, with "250th ANNIVERSARY OF HIS BIRTH" inscribed above, "SIR WALTER SCOTT NOVELIST, HISTORIAN, POET" inscribed in the middle ring and 2021 inscribed below	THE WILL TO DO, THE SOUL TO DARE	Stephen Raw	0
2022	The 100th Anniversary of the death of Alexander Graham Bell	Depiction of the buttons of a telephone, with "PIONEER OF THE TELEPHONE 1847 1922" split across each button	INNOVATION IN SCIENCE BELL	Henry Gray	0
2022	Celebrating the life and legacy of Dame Vera Lynn	Vera Lynn, with "DAME VERA LYNN 1917 - 2020" inscribed to the left	WE'LL MEET AGAIN	The Royal Mint Engraving Team	0
2022	Celebrating 150 Years of the FA Cup	The 2014 FA Cup, with "CELEBRATING 150 YEARS OF THE FA CUP" inscribed around it	FOOTBALL's GREATEST CUP COMPETITION	Matt Dent and Christian Davies	0
2022	25 Years of the £2 Coin	The definitive version of the £2 coin from 1997, but with the number "25" in the central hologram	STANDING ON THE SHOULDERS OF GIANTS	Bruce Rushin	0
2023	50th Anniversary of the death of J. R. R. Tolkien	Monogram of J.R.R. Tolkien	NOT ALL THOSE WHO WANDER ARE LOST	David Lawrence	0
2023	200th Anniversary of death of Edward Jenner	A crowd of miniature people surrounding a smallpox virus	INNOVATION IN SCIENCE JENNER	Henry Gray	0
2023	Centenary of the Flying Scotsman	The Flying Scotsman steaming, "LNER 4472 1923 - 2023" inscribed below	LIVE FOR THE JOURNEY	John Bergdahl	0
2023	Ada Lovelace	Punchcard and text, "a discover of the hidden realities of nature," in reference to how Lovelace described herself in a letter she wrote to her mother in 1841.	INNOVATION IN SCIENCE LOVELACE	Osborne Ross	0
2024	Celebrating 200 Years of the National Gallery	The front of the National Gallery	MAIORVM GLORIA POSTERIS LVMEN EST ("The glory of our ancestors is a light to our posterity")	Edwina Ellis	0
2024	150th Anniversary of Sir Winston Churchill's Birth	A Young Winston Churchill, with the dates 1874 - 1965 flanking him	PAVE THE WAY FOR PEACE AND FREEDOM	Natasha Seaward	0

== "Inverted effigy" coins ==
In 2015, a small number of £2 coins entered circulation that featured the Queen’s head rotated clockwise by approximately 150 degrees. The Royal Mint stated that the misalignment of the Queen’s effigy was "almost certainly the result of one of the dies working loose and rotating during the striking process". Change Checker, a coin dealing website, suggests that the rotated die may have affected as few as around 3,250 coins.

== Mintages ==
Uni-metallic coin
- 1986 ~ 8,212,184 (Commonwealth Games - Edinburgh)
- 1989 ~ 4,392,825 (Bill of Rights - 1689–1989)
- 1989 ~ 381,400 (Claim of Right - 1689-1989 Scotland)
- 1989 ~ 4,777,891 (in all versions, including proofs)
- 1994 ~ 1,443,116 (Tercentenary of the Bank of England)
- 1995 ~ 4,394,566 (50th anniversary of the end of the Second World War)
- 1995 ~ 1,668,575 (50th anniversary of founding of the United Nations)
- 1996 ~ 5,141,350 (10th European Football Championship)

Bi-metallic coin – total
- 1997 ~ 13,734,625
- 1998 ~ 91,110,375
- 1999 ~ 33,719,000
- 2000 ~ 25,770,000
- 2001 ~ 34,984,750
- 2002 ~ 13,024,750
- 2003 ~ 17,531,250
- 2004 ~ 11,981,500
- 2005 ~ 3,837,250
- 2006 ~ 16,715,000
- 2007 ~ 10,270,000
- 2008 ~ 30,107,000
- 2009 ~ 8,775,000
- 2010 ~ 6,890,000
- 2011 ~ 24,375,030
- 2012 ~ 3,900,000
- 2013 ~ 15,860,250
- 2014 ~ 18,200,000
- 2015 ~ 35,360,058
- 2015 ~ 650,000 (Britannia)
- 2016 ~ 2,925,000 (Britannia)
- 2017 ~ 0 (zero) (Britannia or Shield)
- 2018 ~ 0 (zero)
- 2019 ~ 0 (zero)
- 2020 ~ 0 (zero)
- 2021 ~ 6,045,000 (Britannia)
- 2022 ~ 4,030,000 (Britannia)
- 2023 ~ 0 (National flowers)
- 2024 ~ 0 (National flowers)

Bi-metallic coin – commemoratives issued into circulation
- 1999 ~ 4,933,000 (Rugby World Cup)
- 2001 ~ 4,558,000 (Marconi)
- 2002 ~ 771,750 (Commonwealth Games – Scotland)
- 2002 ~ 588,500 (Commonwealth Games – Wales)
- 2002 ~ 485,500 (Commonwealth Games – Northern Ireland)
- 2002 ~ 650,500 (Commonwealth Games – England)
- 2003 ~ 4,299,000 (DNA)
- 2004 ~ 5,004,500 (Trevithick)
- 2005 ~ 10,191,000 (World War Two)
- 2005 ~ 5,140,500 (Gunpowder Plot)
- 2006 ~ 7,928,250 (Brunel – portrait)
- 2006 ~ 7,452,250 (Brunel – achievements)
- 2007 ~ 7,545,000 (Act of Union)
- 2007 ~ 8,445,000 (Abolition of Slave Trade)
- 2008 ~ 910,000 (1908 Olympic Games)
- 2008 ~ 918,000 (Beijing Olympic Games Handover)
- 2009 ~ 3,903,000 (Charles Darwin)
- 2009 ~ 3,253,000 (Robert Burns)
- 2010 ~ 6,175,000 (Florence Nightingale)
- 2011 ~ 975,000 (King James Bible)
- 2011 ~ 1,040,000 (The Mary Rose)
- 2012 ~ 845,000 (Rio Olympic Games Handover)
- 2012 ~ 8,190,000 (Charles Dickens – 200th Anniversary)
- 2013 ~ 1,690,000 (London Underground – train)
- 2013 ~ 1,560,000 (London Underground – roundel)
- 2013 ~ 2,990,000 (Anniversary of the Guinea)
- 2014 ~ 5,720,000 (Anniversary of the Outbreak of the First World War)
- 2014 ~ 3,705,000 (500th Anniversary of Trinity House)
- 2015 ~ 1,495,000 (800th Anniversary of Magna Carta)
- 2015 ~ 650,000 (The Royal Navy)
- 2016 ~ 4,355,000 (William Shakespeare – Comedy)
- 2016 ~ 5,655,000 (William Shakespeare – History)
- 2016 ~ 4,615,000 (William Shakespeare – Tragedy)
- 2016 ~ 9,550,000 (First World War Army)
- 2016 ~ 1,625,000 (The Great Fire of London)

== See also ==
- Coins of the pound sterling
- Double sovereign
- Banknotes of the pound sterling
