= Martham railway station =

Former railway station in Norfolk, England

Coordinates: 52.7016°N 1.6317°E

Martham
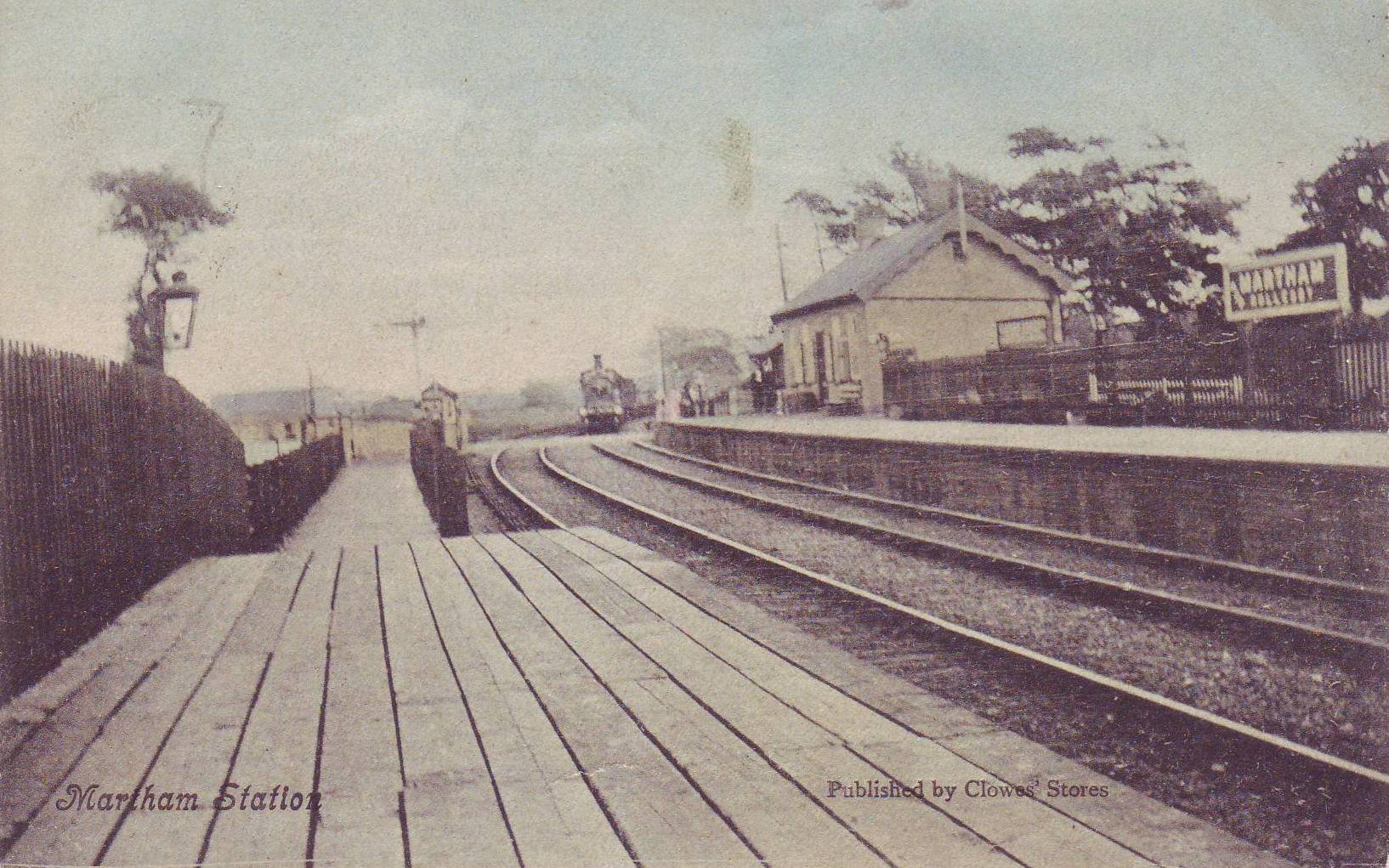

General information
- Location: Martham, Great Yarmouth; England
- Grid reference: TG454176
- Platforms: 2

Other information
- Status: Disused

History
- Pre-grouping: Yarmouth & North Norfolk Railway; Midland and Great Northern Joint Railway
- Post-grouping: Midland and Great Northern Joint Railway; Eastern Region of British Railways

Key dates
- 15 July 1878: Opened (Martham)
- 1 November 1897: Renamed (Martham for Rollesby)
- 2 March 1959: Closed
Location

Martham railway station was a station in Martham, Norfolk. It was on the line between Melton Constable and Great Yarmouth. It closed in 1959.

Preceding station	Disused railways	Following station
Potter Heigham Bridge Halt	Midland and Great Northern; Yarmouth Line	Hemsby
