= Catfield railway station =

Disused railway station in England

Coordinates: 52.74642°N 1.53668°E

Catfield

General information
- Location: Catfield, North Norfolk; England
- Grid reference: TG388224
- Platforms: 1

Other information
- Status: Disused

History
- Pre-grouping: Yarmouth & North Norfolk Railway { Midland and Great Northern Joint Railway
- Post-grouping: Midland and Great Northern Joint Railway; Eastern Region of British Railways

Key dates
- 17 January 1880: Opened
- 2 March 1959: Closed
Location

Catfield railway station was a station in Catfield, Norfolk. It closed in 1959.

Former Services

Preceding station	Disused railways	Following station
Sutton Staithe Halt	Midland and Great Northern; Yarmouth Line	Potter Heigham
