= Martham =

Village in Norfolk, England

Coordinates: 52.70844°N 1.63282°E

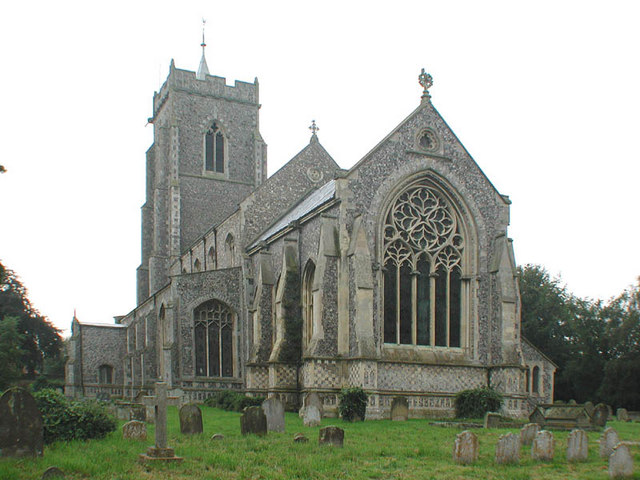
- St Mary, Martham

- Location within Norfolk
- Area: 11.84 km^{2} (4.57 sq mi)
- Population: 3,569 (2011)
  - Density: 301/km^{2} (780/sq mi)
- OS grid reference: TG455185
- Civil parish: Martham
- District: Great Yarmouth
- Shire county: Norfolk
- Region: East
- Country: England
- Sovereign state: United Kingdom
- Post town: GREAT YARMOUTH
- Postcode district: NR29
- Dialling code: 01493
- Police: Norfolk
- Fire: Norfolk
- Ambulance: East of England
- UK Parliament: Great Yarmouth

Martham is a village and civil parish in the Borough of Great Yarmouth in Norfolk. England. It is situated some 10 mi (16 km) north-west of the town of Great Yarmouth and 19 mi (31 km) north-east of the city of Norwich.

== Correct pronunciation ==
"Marthan"

== History ==
The villages name means 'marten homestead/village' or 'weasel/marten hemmed-in land'. The Saxons settled in Martham around AD601 and gave the village its name, "the ham of the martens", the home of the polecats. Bracey's Mill is a drainage mill built in 1908. It was converted to residential use in 1955.

== Parish ==
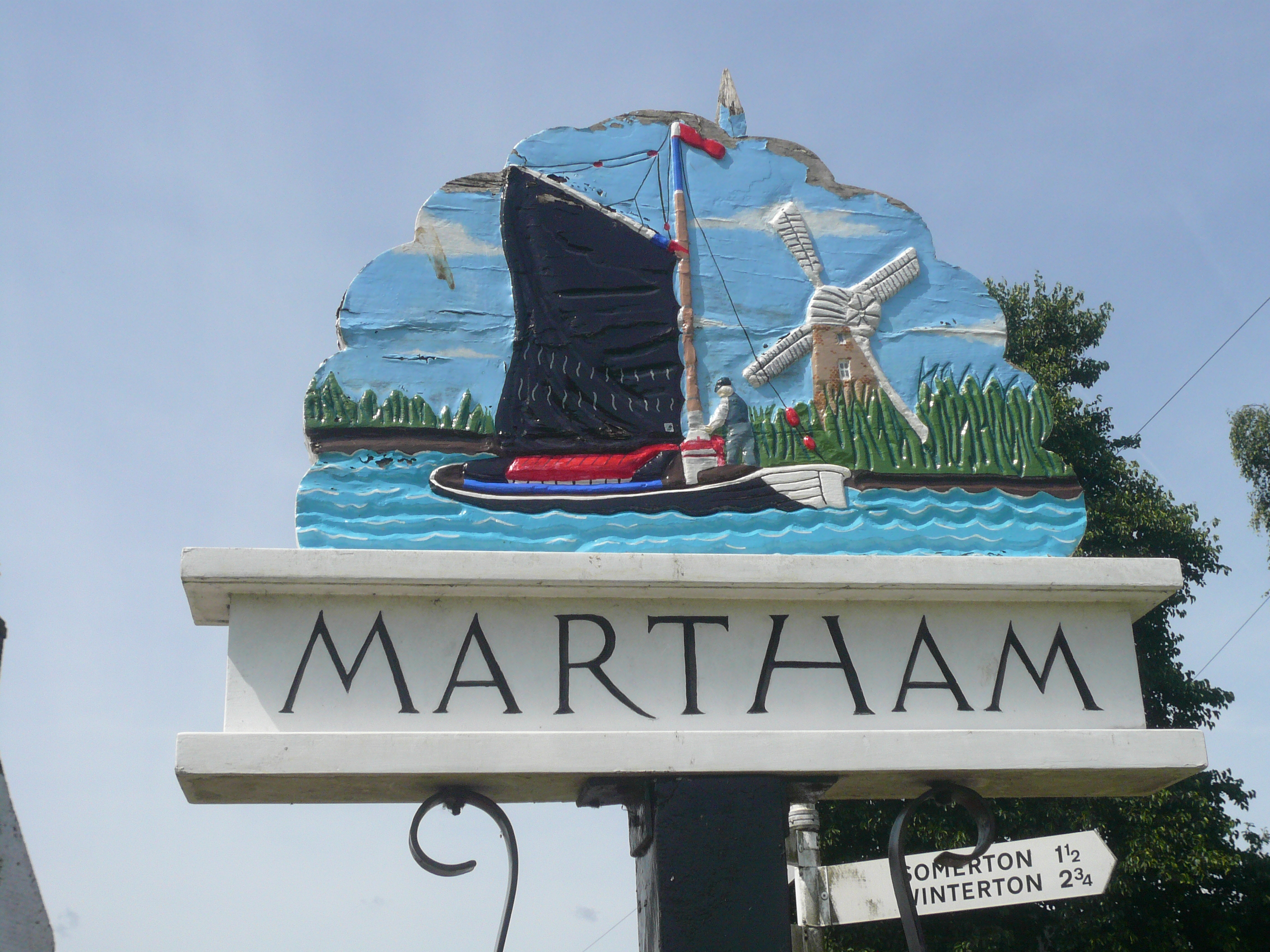
Martham village sign

The civil parish has an area of 11.84 km^{2} (4.57 sq mi) and in the 2001 census had a population of 3,126 in 1,267 households, the population including Cess and increasing at the 2011 Census to 3,569. In recent years the population has expanded with considerable housing being constructed.

== Transport ==
Bus service to Great Yarmouth is regular. There was a railway station that served the village, with a level crossing on Rollesby Road. The station closed in 1959, when the entire line from Great Yarmouth to North Walsham was closed. The station buildings stood for another 30 years.

== Education ==
Education is available in the village from Early Years to aged 16. Martham Primary & Nursery caters for children up to Year 6, with Flegg High School taking students from Year 7 to Year 11. Post 16 education is available at other establishments outside of Martham.

== Village centre ==
The village has several Georgian houses, a large village green, covering three areas of greensward and two duck ponds. Near St Mary's church Church of England, Ferrygate Lane leads to Martham Ferry, where an unusual floating swing bridge crosses the River Thurne. The bridge leads to Heigham Holmes, an island nature reserve, which can only be accessed by the public on special occasions. About 2 km (1.2 mi) to the north of the village is Martham Broad, a 140 acres (57 ha) nature reserve, which is not navigable by boat.

== Notable people ==
The Anglican missionary Anna Hinderer died in the village in 1870.
