= Upper Thurne Broads and Marshes =

UK Site of Special Scientific Interest

Coordinates: 52.734°N 1.605°E

- Site of Special Scientific Interest
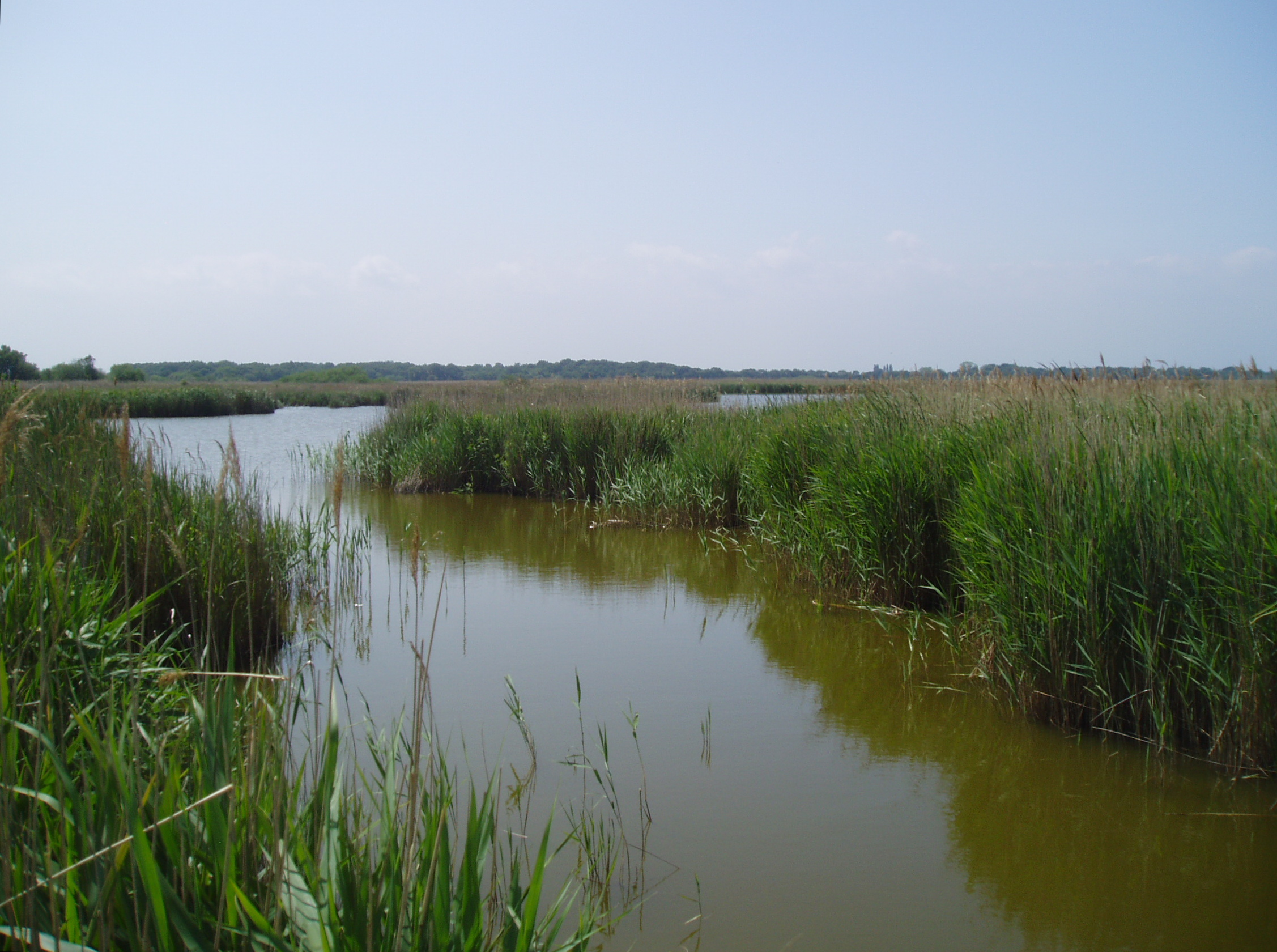
- Hickling Broad
- Location of Upper Thurne Broads and Marshes.
- Area of search: Norfolk
- Grid reference: TG 435 212
- Interest: Biological
- Area: 1,185.9 hectares (2,930 acres)
- Notification date: 1988
- Location map: Magic Map

Upper Thurne Broads and Marshes is a 1,185.9-hectare (2,930-acre) biological Site of Special Scientific Interest north of Great Yarmouth in Norfolk, England. Part of it is a Nature Conservation Review site, Grade I, and it is in the Norfolk Coast Area of Outstanding Natural Beauty. It is part of the Broadland Ramsar site and Special Protection Area, and The Broads Special Area of Conservation. Two areas, Hickling Broad and Martham Broad, are national nature reserves managed by the Norfolk Wildlife Trust.

This is one of the finest wetland complexes in Britain, and it is internationally important for its wetland plant communities and associated animal species. It has four lakes, Hickling Broad, Heigham Sound, Horsey Mere and Martham Broad, together with smaller water bodies, swamp, fen, woodland and grazing marsh.
