= Tracey Moore (cricketer) =

English cricketer (1941–2018)

Personal information
- Full name: Tracey Ivan Moore
- Born: 16 December 1941; Ingham, Norfolk
- Died: 20 January 2018 (aged 76)
- Nickname: TC
- Height: 6 ft 1 in (1.85 m)
- Batting: Right-handed
- Bowling: Right-arm fast-medium
- Role: Bowler

Domestic team information
- Years: Team
- 1959–1978: Norfolk

Career statistics
Competition	List A
Matches	13
Runs scored	24
Batting average	6.00
100s/50s	0/0
Top score	9*
Balls bowled	831
Wickets	19
Bowling average	27.63
5 wickets in innings	1
10 wickets in match	0
Best bowling	6/48
Catches/stumpings	22/–
- Source: CricInfo, 1 February 2018

Tracey Ivan Moore (16 December 1941 – January 2018) was an English cricketer who played for Norfolk County Cricket Club. Moore played for Norfolk 169 times in the Minor Counties Championship and is the second highest wicket-taker in the county's history with 474 wickets taken. He also played for Minor Counties North and Minor Counties East.

== Cricket career ==
Moore was born in Ingham, Norfolk in 1941 and educated at Stalham High School. He made his cricket debut for Norfolk as a teenager in 1959 and played for the county in the Minor Counties Championship each season until 1978. He captained Norfolk in the Championship, becoming the first state educated player to do so. He bowled fast-medium pace and was described as having "good line and length" and as "a strong man who could hit the pitch hard". He took five or more wickets in an innings 17 times in the Championship and returned best bowling figures of eight wickets for 71 runs against Hertfordshire. His 474 Championship wickets for Norfolk is second only to Michael Falcon and were taken at an average of 25.28.

Moore played four matches for Norfolk in the Gillette Cup between 1965 and 1969, making his List A cricket debut against Hampshire at County Ground, Southampton in the 1965 competition. He took six wickets against Yorkshire County Cricket Club in the competition in 1968, the best bowling figures for Norfolk in a List A match. Between 1972 and 1976 he played for Minor Counties North and Minor Counties East representative teams in the Benson & Hedges Cup making a total of 13 List A appearances. In local cricket he played for Ingham Cricket Club for 40 years.

== Later life ==
Away from cricket Moore worked as a sales representative for companies such as Waveney Fork Trucks in Norfolk. On 23 January 2018 it was announced that he died at the age of 76 after a battle with cancer.
