= The Museum of the Broads =

Museum in Norfolk, England

Coordinates: 52.7676°N 1.5166°E

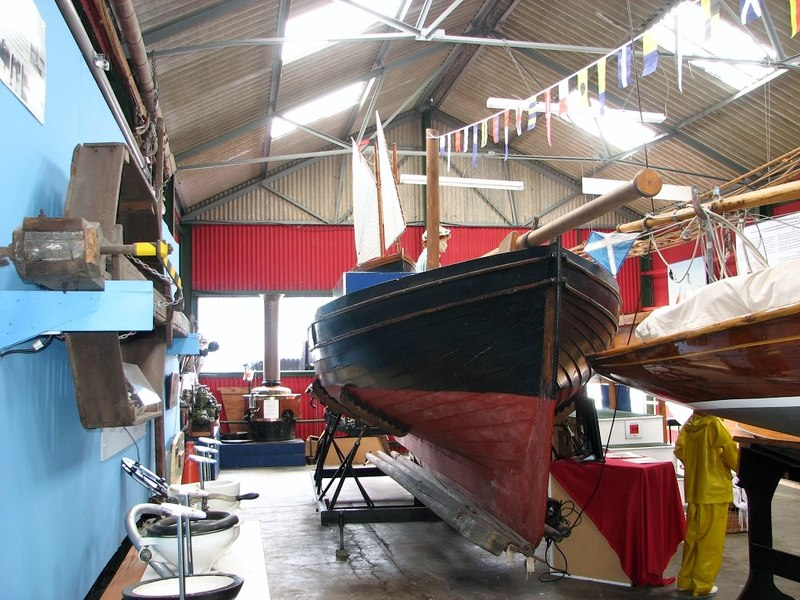
A racing yacht in the museum

The Museum of the Broads is an accredited museum and registered charity in Stalham, Norfolk, England. It describes its mission as being to "bring the story of the Broads alive". The Norfolk Broads are a network of mostly navigable rivers and lakes in the English counties of Norfolk and Suffolk.

The museum covers all aspects of the Broads ranging from the landscape, industry, wildlife, people, holidays and boats and is open from Easter until the end of October every year. The Museum has an extensive collection of boats, models, marsh working tools, boat plans, paintings, books, photographs, postcards, wildlife, and other social history items and memorabilia. Its Victorian steam launch ‘Falcon’, built in 1894, enables visitors to experience the Broads by water. The museum also holds the findings and equipment of the ecologist Joyce Lambert, who proved in the 1950s that the lakes and landscape of the Broads were man-made.

The museum first opened in Potter Heigham in 1996, and moved to its current location at the Poor's Staithe in Stalham in 1999. The museum is supported by its Patron, Henry Cator OBE DL, managed by a board of trustees, and largely staffed by volunteers. The museum attracts 8,000 plus visitors every year.
