= Potter Heigham Windmill =

Windmill in Potter Heigham, Norfolk, England

- Interactive map of Potter Heigham Windmill

Origin
- Mill name: Potter Heigham Windmill
- Mill location: Potter Heigham, Norfolk, United Kingdom
- Grid reference: TG 4141 1875
- Coordinates: 52°42′44″N 1°34′21″E
- Year built: 1849

Information
- Purpose: Corn mill
- Type: Tower mill
- Storeys: Six storeys
- No. of sails: Four
- Type of sails: Patent sails
- Windshaft: Cast iron
- Winding: Fantail
- Fantail blades: Eight
- Auxiliary power: Steam engine, later electric motor
- No. of pairs of millstones: Two pairs
- Size of millstones: 4 feet 8 inches (1.42 m) diamter

Potter Heigham Mill is a Grade II listed tower mill in Potter Heigham, Norfolk, United Kingdom. It was built in 1849. The mill worked by wind until at least 1926, then by electricity until 1949. The tower remains with some machinery inside.

== History ==
A windmill is marked on Faden's 1797 map of Norfolk. It was a post mill. Robert Newton was the miller in 1806. John Walterton Lubbock was the owner and miller in 1816, when he was declared bankrupt. The mill was offered for sale by auction, but did not sell. It was offered to let in September 1818. The miller in 1836 was Samuel Boyce, followed by Simon Boyce by 1841.

Messrs. Martin of Beccles, Suffolk built the tower mill for Simon Boyce in 1849. George Boyce was the miller in 1883 and Simonds Boyce was the miller in 1888, when he was declared bankrupt. The mill was offered for sale by auction in February 1889. Simon Pollard was the miller in 1890, followed by William Boyce in October 1890. Arthur Moore was the occupier in 1900, when the mill was offered for sale by auction that June. A 10hp portable engine by Ransomes had been installed as auxiliary power by then. The mill was not sold, bidding having reached £495. It was subsequently sold to Edward Bristow, William Boyce being retained as manager. Reba Bristow followed in 1908. He joined the armed forces in 1917 and was a casualty of World War I. The mill was sold to John Blaxall in 1919. It was working by wind in 1926, but one pair of sails and the fantail had been removed by 1934. An electric motor had been installed as auxiliary power by 1933. The mill worked until 1949. The cap was removed in October 1953 and a conical roof fitted to the tower. Arthur C. Smith surveyed the mill on 15 May 1971. He described it as a preserved tower with some machinery remaining. The mill was sold in 1977 to Maurice Cox and James Blaxhall. It was listed Grade II on 12 May 1987. The mill was sold in 2009 to Harriet Cox, who launched an appeal for £1,000 for repairs to the tower and roof.

== Description ==
Potter Heigham Windmill is a six storey tower mill. The tower is 23 feet 0 inches (7.01 m) diameter internally at ground floor level with walls 18 inches (460 mm) thick. It is 65 feet 0 inches (19.81 m) tall. It had a boat shaped cap with a petticoat. A cast iron windshaft carried four double Patent sails, which had nine bays of three shutters. The sails were originally 30 feet 0 inches (9.14 m) long and 9 feet 0 inches (2.74 m) wide. They were later reduced to 27 feet 0 inches (8.23 m) long by 8 feet 4 inches (2.54 m) wide. The mill was winded by an eight-blade fantail. The cast iron upright shaft is sixteen sided. The cast iron great spur wheel is 7 feet 0 inches (2.13 m) diameter. Two pairs of 4 feet 8 inches (1.42 m) diameter French Burr millstones were driven underdrift and survive.
