= Tracy Moore =

Tracy Moore may refer to:

- Tracy Moore (basketball) (born 1965), American basketball player
- Tracy Moore (journalist) (born 1975), Canadian journalist

== See also ==
- Tracey Moore (disambiguation)
