= Flegg High Ormiston Academy =

Location
- Somerton Road, Martham; Great Yarmouth, Norfolk, NR29 4QD; England; 52°42′45″N 1°38′26″E

Information
- Former name: Flegg High School
- Type: Academy
- Motto: Kindness, Aspiration, Respect
- Local authority: Norfolk County Council
- Trust: Ormiston Academies Trust
- Department for Education URN: 145501 Tables
- Ofsted: Reports
- Principal: Simon Gilbert Barnham
- Gender: Mixed
- Age range: 11–16
- Capacity: 950
- Houses: Britten; Julian; Martin; Nelson
- Colours: Navy, Blue, White
- Website: www.fleggormistonacademy.co.uk

Flegg High Ormiston Academy (formerly Flegg High School) is an 11–16 mixed secondary school with academy status in Martham, Great Yarmouth, Norfolk, England.

== Description ==
It was built in the 1960s for boys and girls aged 11–16. Much of the school has been expanded over the years and in 2005 major building work was undertaken to accommodate the inclusion of Year 7 pupils, and generally update the buildings, bringing the school roll in September 2007 up to near 1,000 pupils.

The school was rated Good in the 2016 Ofsted. In 2022, it was judged to Require Improvement. As of 2026, its most recent inspection was in 2025, with judgements of Requires Improvement for quality of education, and of Good for behaviour, personal development and leadership.

In February 2018, Ormiston Academies Trust took over the high school, turning it into an academy. It was renamed "Flegg High Ormiston Academy". As of 2025, the school is in partnership with Ormiston Venture Academy, and the senior principal of Flegg High is also the principal of Ormiston Venture Academy.
