= Stalham High School =

Location
- Brumstead Road; Stalham, Norfolk, NR12 9DG; England; 52°46′20″N 1°31′06″E

Information
- Type: Academy
- Established: 1939
- Local authority: Norfolk
- Trust: North Norfolk Academy Trust
- Department for Education URN: 141395 Tables
- Ofsted: Reports
- Head of School: Lee McMahon
- Gender: Mixed
- Age: 11 to 16
- Enrolment: As of 2024: 482
- Capacity: As of 2024: 654
- Houses: Cavell, Fry, Nelson, Pinsent
- Colours: Yellow, Grey, Red, Blue
- Website: www.stalhamhigh.co.uk

Stalham High School is a mixed secondary school located in Stalham in the English county of Norfolk.

== Description ==
It is one of the smallest high schools in Norfolk, with 431 pupils on the roll in January 2015. The school mainly admits pupils from surrounding primary schools in Catfield, East Ruston, Hickling, Lessingham, Ludham, Stalham, Sutton and Worstead. The school offers GCSEs as well as a range of vocational courses as programmes of study for pupils.

On 1 January 2015, the school was given academy status, sponsored by the North Norfolk Academy Trust, led by Sheringham High School.

Since October 2015, the school has become a 'Community Hub' within the Norwich City Community Sports Foundation (CSF).

The school has previously been designated as a specialist Humanities College as part of the specialist schools programme and it was a member of the Microsoft IT Academy programme.
