= Martham Broad =

Nature reserve in Norfolk, England

Coordinates: 52.724°N 1.650°E

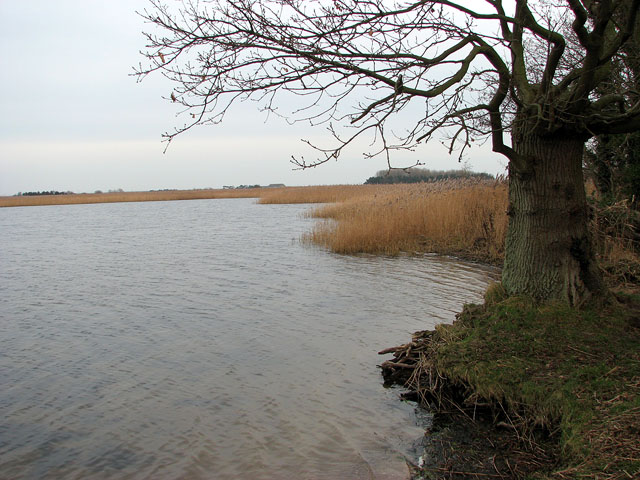
- Interactive map of Martham Broad
- Type: National nature reserve
- Location: Great Yarmouth, Norfolk
- OS grid: TG 466 203
- Area: 60 hectares (150 acres)
- Manager: Norfolk Wildlife Trust

Martham Broad is a 60-hectare (150-acre) national nature reserve north of Great Yarmouth in Norfolk. It is managed by the Norfolk Wildlife Trust, and is part of the Upper Thurne Broads and Marshes Site of Special Scientific Interest. It is also part of the Broadland Ramsar site and Special Protection Area, and The Broads Special Area of Conservation.

This reserve is composed of two shallow broads divided by the River Thurne, together with fen, reedbeds and marshes. There are a number of bat species and breeding birds include bearded tits, common terns, Cetti's warblers and marsh harriers.

There is public access to the site.
