= Sutton, Norfolk =

Village in Norfolk, England

Coordinates: 52°45′36″N 1°31′59″E

Sutton
- village
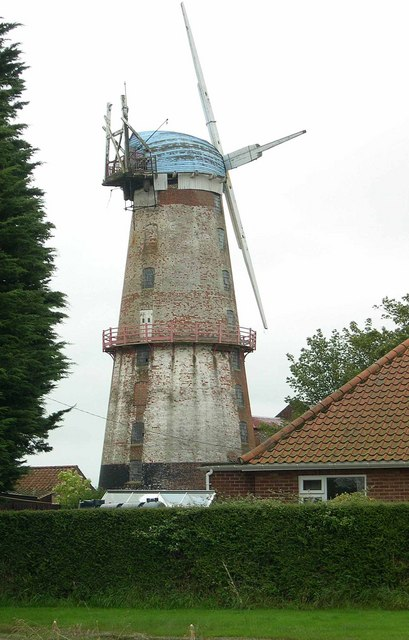
- Sutton Windmill

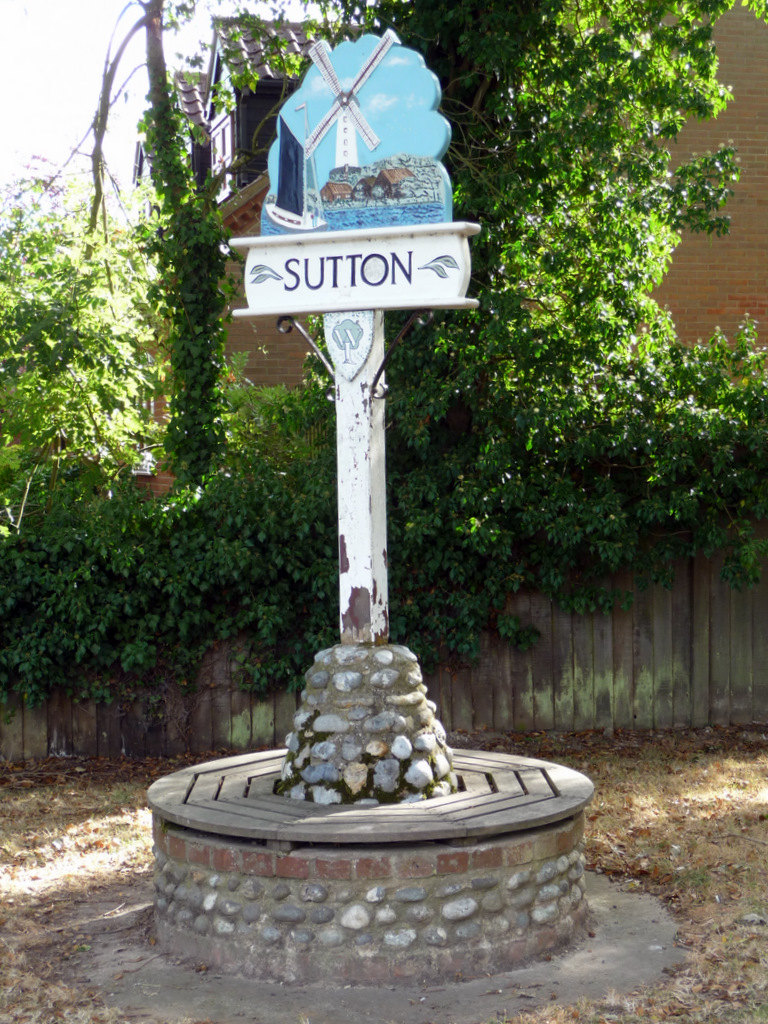
- Sutton village sign and pedestal

- Location within Norfolk
- Area: 6.34 km^{2} (2.45 sq mi)
- Population: 1,705 (2022)
  - Density: 269/km^{2} (700/sq mi)
- OS grid reference: TG385235
- District: North Norfolk
- Shire county: Norfolk
- Region: East
- Country: England
- Sovereign state: United Kingdom
- Post town: NORWICH
- Postcode district: NR12 9
- Dialling code: 01692 5
- Police: Norfolk
- Fire: Norfolk
- Ambulance: East of England
- UK Parliament: North Norfolk

Sutton is a village and civil parish in the English county of Norfolk. It is located adjacent to the Norfolk Broads (Barton Broad to its south-west, and Hickling Broad to its south-east), about 16 miles (26 kilometres) north-east of Norwich on the A149 road, adjacent to the slightly larger market town of Stalham (and Stalham Green).

Dating originally from the Norman period, and recorded in the Domesday Book of 1086, Sutton has a public house and hotel (located next to Sutton Staithe), infant school, garden centre, village hall, duck pond, and an approximately 850-year-old flint-built Anglican parish church. Nearby is the striking landmark of Sutton Mill (OS grid ref TG 39577 23871), an 18th century Grade II* listed building (first listed 16 April 1955), the tallest mill in the United Kingdom. Tourism and recreational facilities include Sutton Staithe, and the Museum of the Broads is nearby at Stalham Staithe.

== Governance ==
Sutton is part of the electoral ward of Stalham and Sutton. Covering a combined area of 1,364 hectares (3,370 acres), the total population of this ward at the 2011 Census was 4,312 from 1,991 households, giving a population density of 3.20 persons per hectare.
