= River Thurne =

River in Norfolk, England

Thurne
- The River Thurne at Potter Heigham

- Location of the river mouth within Norfolk

Location
- Country: England
- Region: Norfolk

Physical characteristics
- Source
  - location: near Martham Broad, West Somerton
  - coordinates: 52.7219°N 1.6539°E
  - elevation: 1 m (3 ft 3 in)
- Mouth: River Bure
  - location: Thurne
  - coordinates: 52.6816°N 1.5492°E
  - elevation: 0 m (0 ft)
- Length: 10.6 km (6.6 mi)

Basin features
- River system: River Bure

The River Thurne is a river in Norfolk, England in The Broads. Just 7 miles (11 km) long, it rises 2 miles (3.2 km) from the coast near Martham Broad and is navigable from West Somerton. It flows southwest and is linked by Candle Dyke and Heigham Sound to both Horsey Mere and Hickling Broad. It continues southwest and flows through Potter Heigham (passing under its medieval bridge) and enters the River Bure just south of Thurne dyke, near St Benet's Abbey.

== Navigation ==
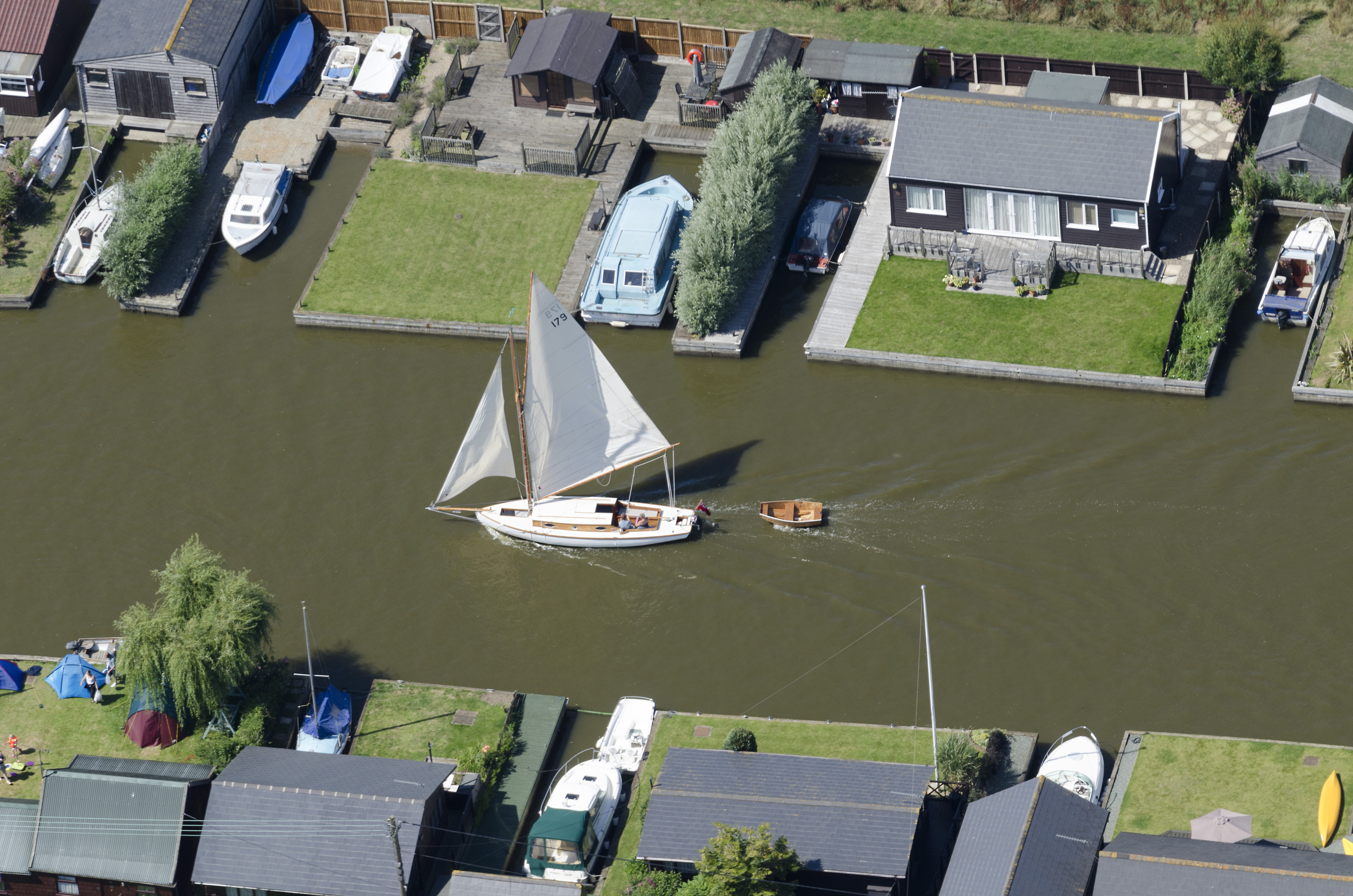
Sailing on the Thurne through Potter Heigham

Much of the River Thurne system is navigable, but there are a number of restrictions to the size of boats that can use it. The most famous is the medieval bridge at Potter Heigham. Most road traffic now uses the A149 Bypass, slightly to the north, but the narrow central arch restricts passage to boats needing headroom of less than 6.6 feet (2.0 m), and is the lowest bridge on the Broads. In addition, the river is still tidal here, and although the rise and fall is only about 6 inches (15 cm), currents through the bridge are quite strong. It is a requirement that all hire craft take on a pilot before they pass under the bridge.

Above Potter Heigham, the river is joined by Candle Dyke, which connects to Heigham Sound, from which White Slea Mere leads on to Hickling Broad, where there are moorings. Both Heigham Sound and Hickling Broad are quite shallow, and the navigation channels are clearly marked. Hickling Broad is also a National Nature Reserve. From Heigham Sound, Meadow Dyke leads northwards to Horsey Mere, most of which is a National Trust nature reserve. The National Trust also own Horsey Drainage Mill. Beyond Horsey Mere lies Waxham New Cut, along which boats up to 30 feet (9.1 m) long can travel for about 1.5 miles (2.4 km) to Lound Bridge. The sea is less than 1 mile (1.6 km) from the bridge at this point, although it is 26 miles (42 km) away by boat.

The main river is navigable almost to its source. The channel passes between the parts of Martham Broad, which is a nature reserve owned by the Norfolk Wildlife Trust, to reach West Somerton staithes. The staithes are at the end of a dyke cut from Martham Broad to the village.

Below Potter Heigham, Womack Water is navigable to Ludham, about 1 mile (1.6 km) from the main channel, but is only 4 feet (1.2 m) deep. Navigation is restricted to boats under 46 feet (14 m) in length. Thurne Dyke, a little further below that, is only 3 feet (0.9 m) deep and can be navigated for 170 yards (160 m) to the village of Thurne.

== Structures ==
Potter Heigham bridge is one of the most well-known structures on the Broads. It consists of three arches, two triangular ones built in the fourteenth century, and a central circular arch built when the bridge was altered in the fifteenth century. The brick parapets date from the late eighteenth century. The bridge is a grade II listed structure, and is also a scheduled ancient monument. Just to the north of it is the A149 Potter Heigham Bypass bridge, which now carries most of the traffic which formerly used the medieval bridge, and provides a navigable headroom of 7 feet 7 inches (2.31 m).

The only other place at which vehicles can cross the navigable channel is at Martham Ferry, where a nineteenth-century bridge was replaced in the 1920s by a floating swing bridge, the structure was grade II listed in 1987 but replaced in the same year and was de-listed in 2011. The deck rests on two semi-circular steel buoyancy tanks, and there are concrete abutments on both sides of the river. The bridge pivots on a post at the south side of the river, and is connected by a chain to a winch on the north bank. The structure provides access for farm vehicles from Ferrygate Lane to Heigham Holmes, a national nature reserve managed by the National Trust, which is surrounded by water on all sides, and is normally only open to visitors on one day each year. The deck is lowered onto the concrete abutments when in position by pumping water into the buoyancy tanks, and pumping it out again before the bridge can be opened for navigation. As of 2011 the National Trust were looking to replace the bridge, due to the slow and cumbersome nature of its operation. An engineering survey suggested that a conventional swing bridge or bascule bridge could not easily be installed at the site, and so a replacement of a similar design, but incorporating powered operation is the preferred option.

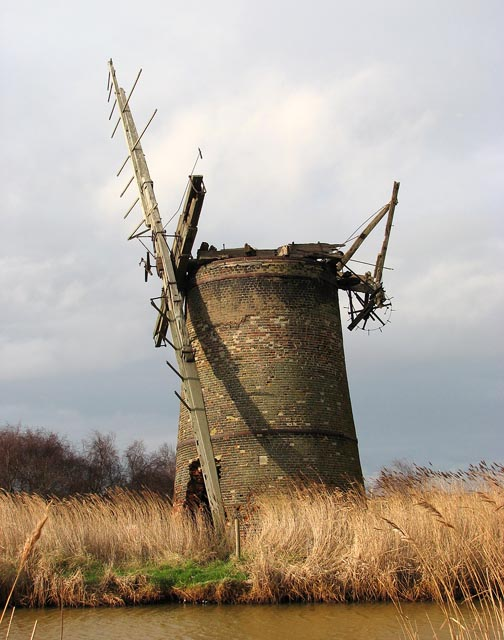
The function of the derelict Brograve drainage mill is now performed by an electric pumping station nearby.

There are nine drainage mills situated along the banks of the river. Brograve Mill on the Waxham New Cut is an early nineteenth century, three-storey brick mill, which is derelict but retained parts of its sails and most of its internal machinery in 2003. West Somerton Mill was built in 1900 by Dan England, from the millwrights England's of Ludham, and is in better condition. Although it has no sails, its internal turbine pump and some of the other machinery are still extant. Horsey Mill is a four-storey structure which pumped water into Horsey Mere, and is owned by the National Trust. It was built in the mid-nineteenth century, and was modified in 1897 and again in 1912, when the work was carried out by Dan England. It originally powered a scoop wheel to raise the water into the mere, but this was replaced by a pumping engine in an outbuilding at the foot of the tower. It ceased to operate in 1943 after being struck by lightning, and was acquired by the National Trust five years later. It was restored in 1961, the work being carried out by the Norfolk Windmills Trust. Its fantail was destroyed during a gale in 1987, and during further restoration, which was completed in 2004, new sails were fitted, but with no shutters or the spider mechanism which operates them. Heigham Holmes Mill is a mid-nineteenth century four-storey brick tower which retains most of its machinery. It is grade II* listed. Like West Somerton, Martham Mill was also built by Dan England, but consists of four storeys and was completed in 1908. It drove a turbine pump, and has now been converted into a residence, as has High's Mill, another four-storey brick tower mill built in the mid-nineteenth century. The next mill downstream is the derelict Repp's Drainage Mill below Potter Heigham.

Thurne Dyke windpump was built in 1820 as a two-storey mill, but a third storey was added in the middle of the nineteenth century. Its cap was blown off during a gale in 1919, and a steam turbine was installed in 1926. It ceased to operate in 1936, and gradually became derelict until it was bought by Bob Morse in 1949, after he moved to Norfolk. He started to restore it with help from Albert England, a descendant of the original builders. Further work was done by the millwrights Thomas Smithdale and Sons of Acle in 1962, and Morse was assisted by the Norfolk Mills Trust from 1975, who funded the fitting of some of the shutters to the sails in 2002, enabling the mill to turn under wind power again. It still contains its internal machinery, which drove an external turbine, housed in an iron casing, and it is grade II* listed. Morse went on to form Morse's Wind Engine Park, a museum devoted to wind pumps from around the world, before he died in 2007. The final mill on the river is at St Benet's Level. It is again grade II* listed, and is a four-storey mill built in the late eighteenth century. It was restored in 1976, when the bevel gears had to be replaced, but all other machinery and the external turbine are intact.

== Points of interest ==
| Point | Coordinates (Links to map resources) | OS Grid Ref | Notes |
|---|---|---|---|
| Randall's Mill | 52.7807°N 1.5725°E | TG410263 | End of New Cut |
| Lound Bridge | 52.7644°N 1.6222°E | TG444246 | Limit of Navigation |
| Horsey Mere | 52.7420°N 1.6237°E | TG446222 | |
| Hickling Broad | 52.7378°N 1.5783°E | TG416215 | |
| West Somerton | 52.7221°N 1.6530°E | TG467200 | Limit of Navigation |
| Martham Broad | 52.7245°N 1.6364°E | TG456202 | |
| Potter Heigham Bridge | 52.7096°N 1.5808°E | TG419184 | |
| Thurne Mouth | 52.6819°N 1.5491°E | TG399152 | Jn with River Bure |

== Bibliography ==
- Cumberlidge, Jane (2009). Inland Waterways of Great Britain (8th Ed). Imray Laurie Norie and Wilson. ISBN 978-1-84623-010-3.
