= Stalham =

Market town in Norfolk, England

Coordinates: 52.770°N 1.511°E

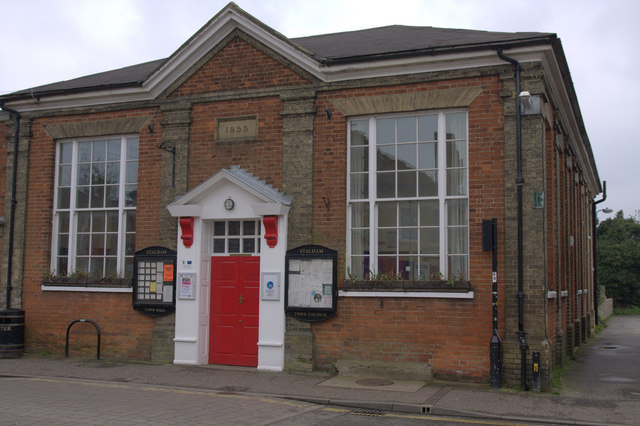
- Stalham Town Hall

- Location within Norfolk
- Area: 2.82 sq mi (7.3 km^{2})
- Population: 3,149 (2011)
  - Density: 1,117/sq mi (431/km^{2})
- OS grid reference: TG3725
- Civil parish: Stalham
- District: North Norfolk
- Shire county: Norfolk
- Region: East
- Country: England
- Sovereign state: United Kingdom
- Post town: NORWICH
- Postcode district: NR12
- Dialling code: 01692
- Police: Norfolk
- Fire: Norfolk
- Ambulance: East of England
- UK Parliament: North Norfolk

Stalham is a market town and civil parish on the River Ant in the English county of Norfolk, in East Anglia. It covers an area of 2.82 mi^{2} (7.3 km^{2}) and had a population of 2,951 in 1,333 households at the 2001 census, the population increasing to 3,149 at the 2011 Census. It lies within the Norfolk Broads, about 15 miles (24 km) north-east of Norwich on the A149 road. For the purposes of local government, it falls within the district of North Norfolk. The parts of the parish lying adjacent to the river fall into the executive area of the Broads Authority.

The name Stalham derives from the Old English stallhām meaning 'village with a fishing pool' or perhaps stallhamm meaning 'hemmed-in land with a fishing pool'.

Stalham was served by a railway station until it was closed in 1959. The nearest railway station is now Worstead.

Through the 1960s Stalham's economy sank from a reduction of the agricultural labour force as a result of improvements in agricultural technology. Beginning in the 1970s, though, housing developments attracted people who took up residence in Stalham but worked elsewhere.

The Museum of the Broads moved to Stalham in 2000 and is situated on Stalham Staithe. It "aims to bring the history of the Broads alive for locals and visitors to Norfolk" and is open to the public throughout the summer.

In 2002 Tesco built a supermarket in Stalham, with considerable controversy, with many residents fearing that it would "kill the high street". Despite this, the High Street contains a wide range of independent traders.

== Governance ==
Stalham is part of the electoral ward of Stalham and Sutton. The total population of this ward at the 2011 Census was 4,312.

== See also ==
- Hunsett Windmill
- Stalham High School
