= Hickling Broad =

Nature reserve in Norfolk, England

Coordinates: 52.743°N 1.596°E

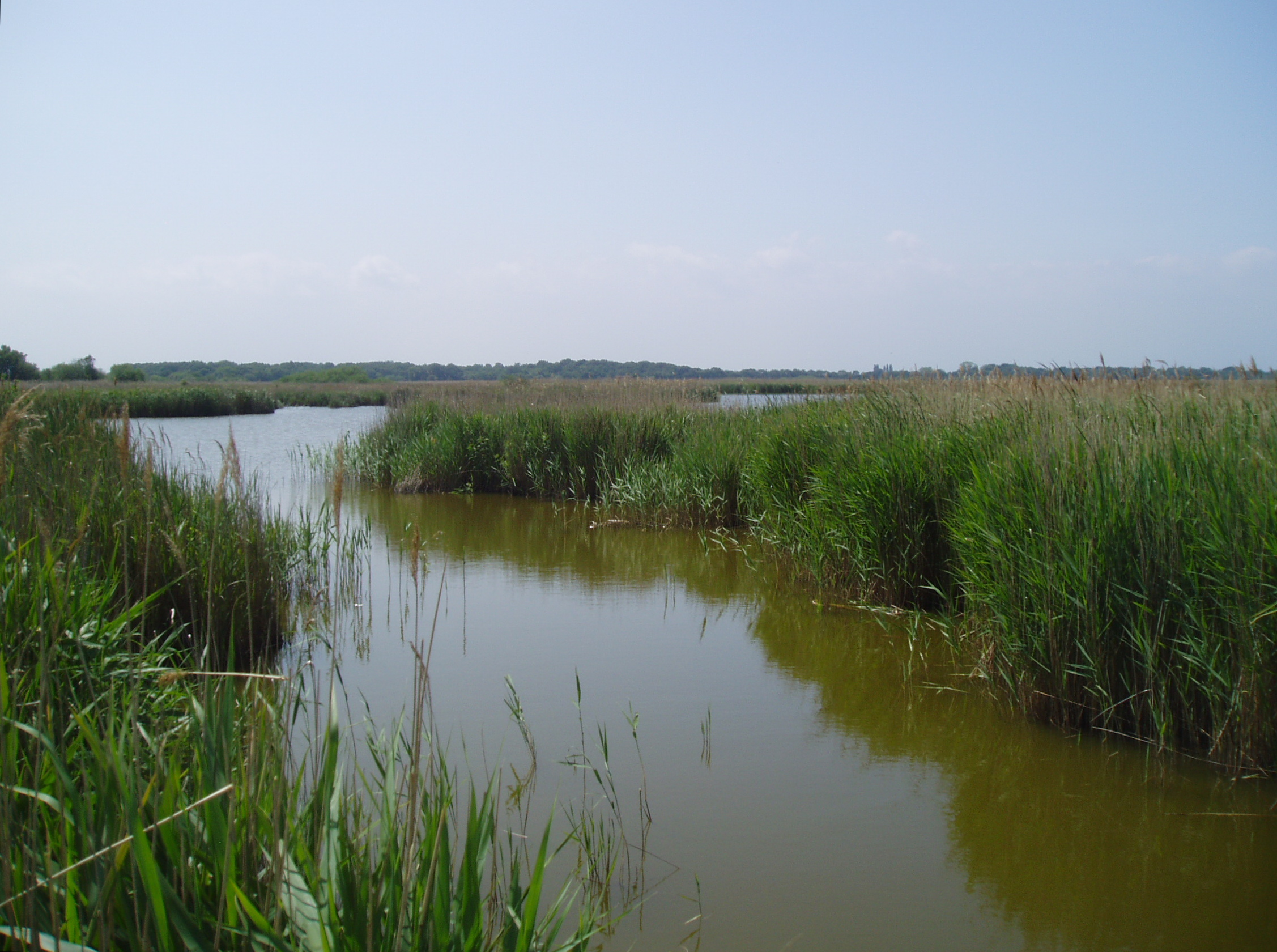
- Interactive map of Hickling Broad
- Type: Nature reserve
- Location: Stalham, Norfolk
- OS grid: TG 428 222
- Area: 600 hectares (1,500 acres)
- Manager: Norfolk Wildlife Trust

Hickling Broad is a 600-hectare (1,500-acre) nature reserve 4 km south-east of Stalham, north-east of Norwich in Norfolk. It is managed by the Norfolk Wildlife Trust. It is a National Nature Reserve and part of the Upper Thurne Broads and Marshes Site of Special Scientific Interest and Hickling Broad and Horsey Mere Nature Conservation Review site, Grade I. It is in the Norfolk Coast Area of Outstanding Natural Beauty, and part of the Broadland Ramsar site and Special Protection Area, and The Broads Special Area of Conservation.

It is the broad with the largest surface area, and the water is slightly brackish, due to its proximity to the sea. The navigation channel is only 1.5 m deep, with much of the broad being shallower; it is 1.4 km^{2}, making it one of the largest expanses of open water in East Anglia.

== Ecology ==
It has the largest reed-bed in England and supports rare waterweeds such as the holly-leaved naiad and three rare species of stonewort. Amongst the rare insects is the Swallowtail butterfly, subspecies Papilio machaon brittanicus which feeds on milk-parsley (Peucedanum palustre), the Norfolk hawker Aeshna isosceles and Emperor dragonfly. Birds that visit the reserve during the winter include cranes, common goldeneyes, shovelers and teals, while Eurasian bitterns, marsh harriers, common pochards, water rails and Cetti's warblers stay for most of the year. There is a waymarked walk around the broad.

== Sea planes ==
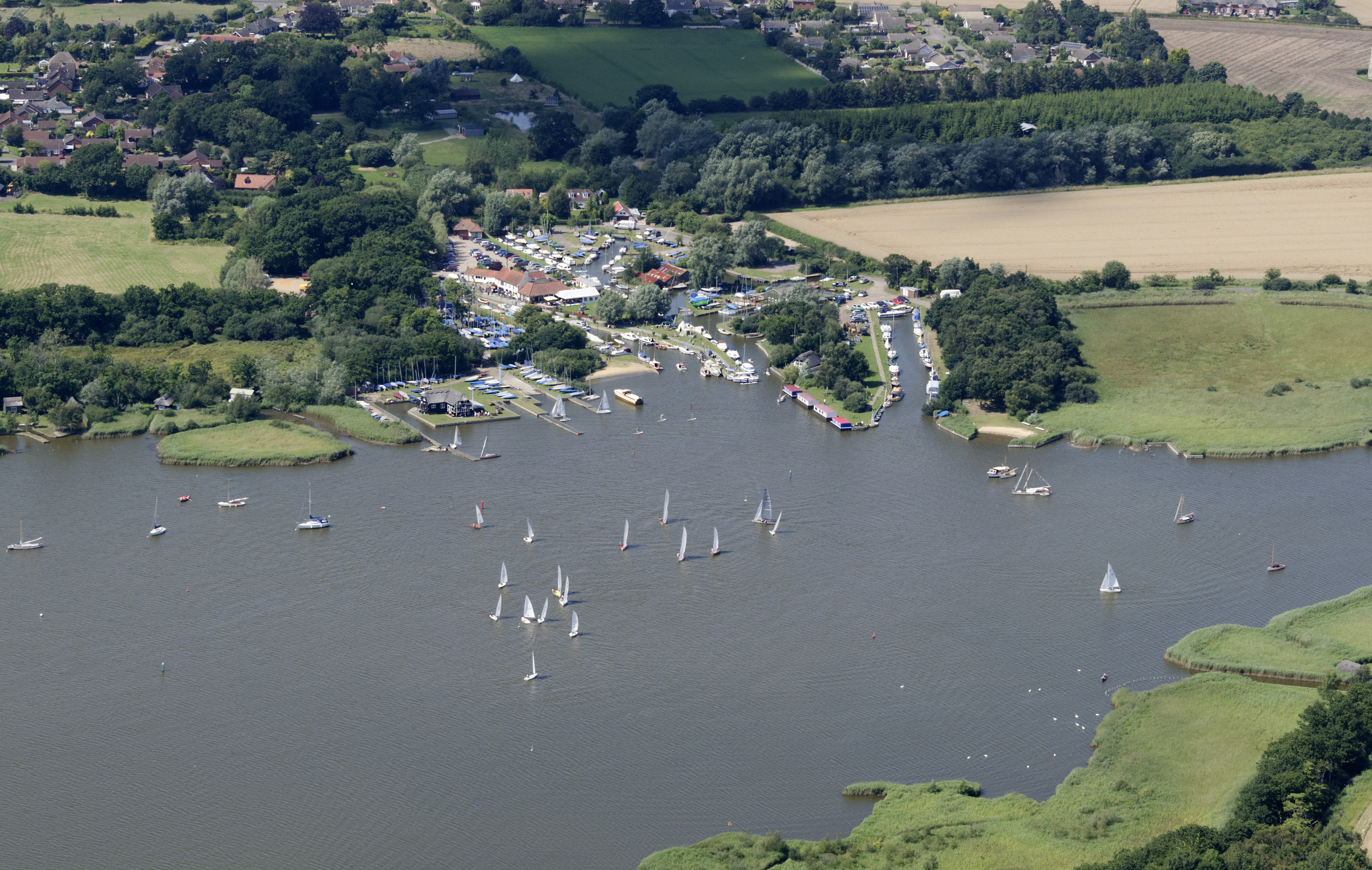
Hickling Broad waterfront

Hickling Broad was used as reserve station for sea planes by the RNAS, in the period 1916–1918, as an escape for RNAS South Denes. It was known as RNAS Hickling Broad. Contractors started building a concrete slipway, but this was never completed. Eventually, Hickling was only used for two emergency landings. A separate arrangement allowed seaplanes destined for Great Yarmouth to land on the calmer waters of the broad if the sea were too rough (this arrangement stands to this day). RNAS South Denes was located in the area which is now the South Denes Camping and Caravan site. There is a commemorative Blue plaque in Regent Street in Great Yarmouth, it reads "Headquarters of the Royal Naval Air Service Occupied these premises during WWI April 1913-November 1918 Flying land & sea planes from South Denes, Hickling Broad[s] [sic], and heavily involved in anti Zeppelin warfare."

== Candle Dyke Eel Sett ==
Adjacent to Hickling Broad and accessed via foot from the reserve is the Candle Dyke Eel Sett, notable as the last remaining eel sett in Great Britain.

Eel setts are simple buildings - usually constructed from wood - that were once found throughout the Broads area, providing overnight accommodation for eel catchers who caught European Eel for food. The eel sett at Candle Dyke is a black-painted hut, with a green door and red sign. In 2024 the building was Grade II listed by Historic England, in recognition of its cultural importance to the lost profession of eel fishing.
