= East Anglian Waterways Association =

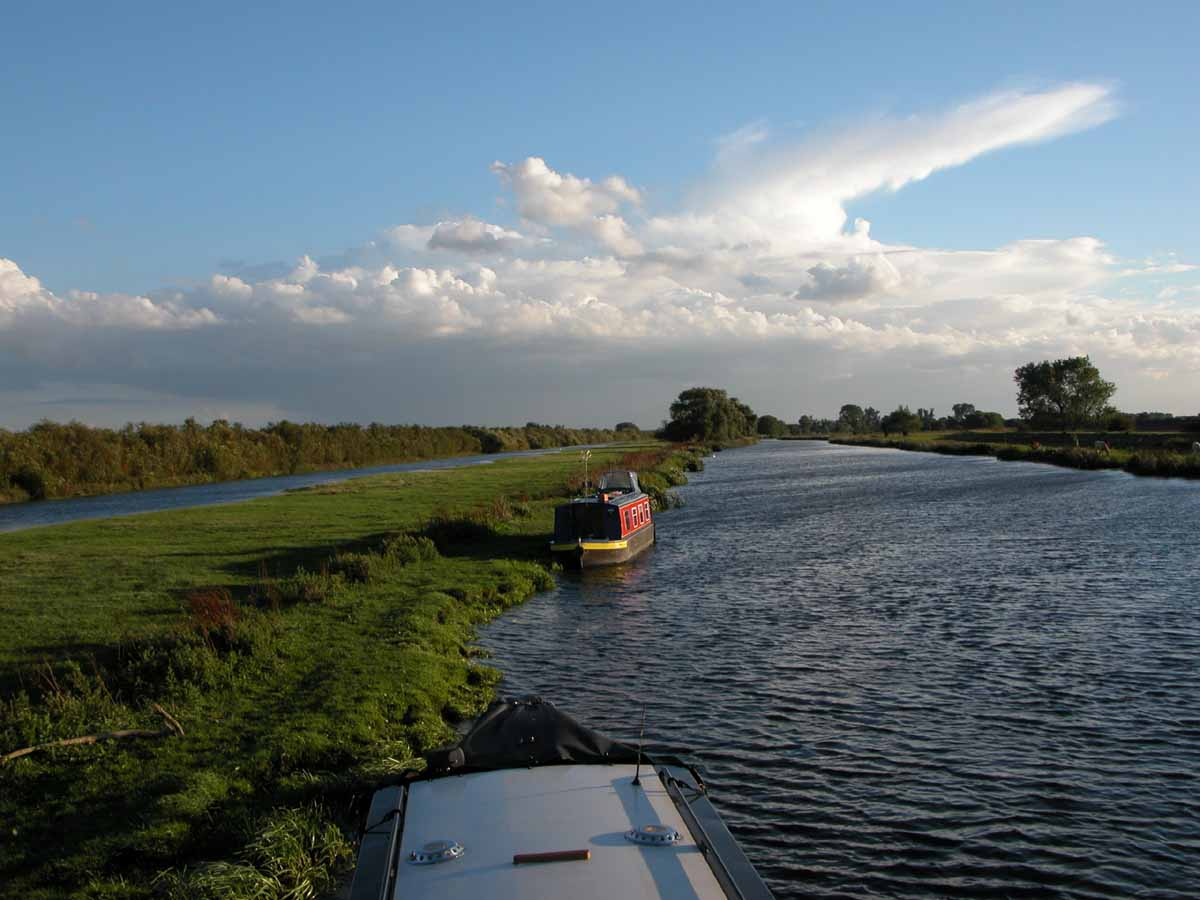
The River Great Ouse above Brownshill Staunch

The East Anglian Waterways Association is a waterway society and an umbrella organisation in East Anglia, England, UK.

The association was founded on 18 April 1958, and it campaigns for the preservation, restoration and good management of the tidal and inland waterways in East Anglia. One of its early projects was an investigation into the complex legal status of the staithes or landing stages on the Norfolk Broads, which was carried out in the 1960s. The research paved the way for many of the staithes to be adopted by the Broads Authority, and retained as public access points to the waterways.

For more than fifty years, EAWA has worked with other organisations to have the River Great Ouse reopened to Bedford, the purchase and restoration of Dilham Dyke on the Broads, and many other projects.

EAWA is also a member of the Broads Forum. Having suggested plans to reopen the North Walsham and Dilham Canal in 1992, and then working actively to achieve that aim, the EAWA helped with the launch of the North Walsham and Dilham Canal Trust in 2008.

The association is also one of the funding partners for the Fens Waterways Link, a multimillion-pound project for the creation of a navigable link through Lincoln, Boston and Spalding to Ely. The Link would open up 240 km of waterway.

EAWA also actively supports related projects, such as the Bourne Eau restoration, the Stamford Canal, and Clay Dike, in partnership with the Inland Waterways Association.

EAWA's partnerships with other waterways trusts / organisations:

- Chelmer Canal Trust
- River Stour Trust
- River Gipping Trust
- Sleaford Navigation Trust
- Little Ouse Group
- Great Ouse Boating Association
- Middle Level Waterman's Club
- Louth Navigation Trust

== See also ==
- List of waterway societies in the United Kingdom
