= ANRC =

ANRC may refer to:

- Alaska Native Regional Corporations, regional corporations in the US that administer and settle land and financial claims made by Alaska Natives
- American National Red Cross, a US emergency relief organisation
- Association of Nene River Clubs, an English association of waterways association
- Australian National Railways Commission, an Australian government railway operating body, 1975 to 1998
- Australian National Research Council, a body that existed between 1919 and 1955
