= Crostwight =

Village in Norfolk, England

Coordinates: 52.815006°N 1.473069°E

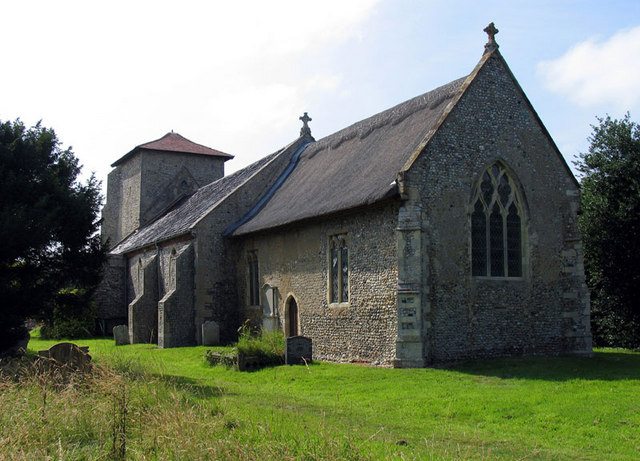
- The Parish Church of All Saints, Crostwight

- Location within Norfolk
- OS grid reference: TG340296
  - London: 137 mi (220 km)
- Civil parish: Honing
- District: North Norfolk
- Shire county: Norfolk
- Region: East
- Country: England
- Sovereign state: United Kingdom
- Post town: NORTH WALSHAM
- Postcode district: NR28
- Dialling code: 01692
- Police: Norfolk
- Fire: Norfolk
- Ambulance: East of England
- UK Parliament: North Norfolk

Crostwight (pronounced "cosset") is a small village and former civil parish, now in the parish of Honing, in the North Norfolk district, in the north-east of the county of Norfolk, England. In the past, it was sometimes called Crostwick, but this risks confusion with the different village of Crostwick, also in Norfolk. In 1931 the parish had a population of 61.

Apart from the church, the village consists of Crostwight Hall, its cottages and outbuildings, an old rectory, and a few other houses.

== Name ==
The name of Crostwight is considered to be Old Norse in origin (kross, 'cross' + þveit, 'clearing'). There are seven such names in Norfolk ending in -thwaite, and one in Suffolk, showing early Scandinavian settlement. While the suffix -thwaite was familiar north of the Humber and has survived there, it has been corrupted elsewhere. Forms of Crostwight's name recorded include Crostwit in 1086, Crosthueit in 1198, and Crostweyt in 1810.

== History ==
Crostwight is recorded in the Domesday Book of 1086, which spells its name 'Crostwit'. At that time, it was held by Geoffrey Baynard under Ralph Baynard. Tempore Regis Eduardi (in the time of King Edward the Confessor), twelve freemen at Crostwit had one hundred and 50 acres (200,000 m^{2}) of land, and there were twelve borderers, with 16 acres (65,000 m^{2}) of meadow. The whole was described as one league (leuca) in length and seven furlongs broad. There is a reference to the church of St Benet's of Hulme, and the people mentioned include Esger the staller and Geoffrey Baynard.

At the time of the Peasants' Revolt of 1381, the area of North Walsham was "the cradle, the supreme fortress, and the tomb of the Norfolk rebels", generating surveys of households, and Crostwight is one of the few places for which complete records survive. Its heads of households were found to consist of nine cultivators, three weavers, two spinsters, one dyer and one fuller.

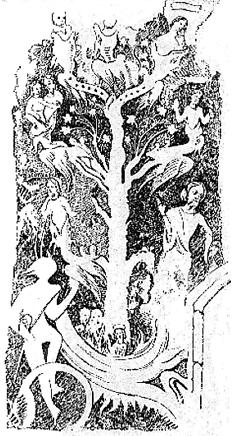
Medieval wall painting of the Seven Deadly Sins in the nave of All Saints' Church, Crostwight (c. 1370), drawn by Mrs Gunn in 1849

According to William White's Gazetteer of 1845:

CROSTWIGHT parish, 4 miles (6.4 km) E. of North Walsham, has only 69 souls, and 777 acres (3.14 km^{2}) of land, mostly the property of Martin James Shepheard, Esq., of the North Walsham and Crostwight Hall, a large old mansion near the ruin of the ancient manor house, which was a seat of the Walpoles. Mr Shepheard is Lord of the manor, and patron of the church (All Saints') which is a rectory, valued in the King's Book at £5. 6s. 8d. and enjoyed by the Rev. Henry Atkinson. The glebe is 10½ A, and the tithes were commuted in 1838 for £153 per annum.

More was said in the 1883 edition of White's Gazetteer:

CROSTWIGHT parish... is in Smallburgh union, Tunstead hundred, North Walsham county court district, Norwich bankruptcy district, Happing and Tunstead petty sessional division, North Walsham polling district of North Norfolk, Waxham rural deanery, and Norfolk archdeaconry. It has a rateable value of £879. It had 74 inhabitants in 1881, and comprises 777 acres (3.14 km^{2}) of land, mostly the property of Mrs Anna Maria Shepheard, of North Walsham, who is also lady of the manor. Crostwight Hall, a large old mansion near the ruins of the ancient manor house, which was a seat of the Walpole and Le Groos families, is occupied by Mr Frederick Gibbs. The CHURCH (All Saints) is a small rubble building, comprising nave, chancel, south porch, and short square tower with one bell. It is of the early Decorated period and retains its elegant rood-loft screen, from which, however, all traces of painting are obliterated. There are some fragments of stained glass in the windows; and on the bosses of the roof the heads of a king and queen may still be seen. In the pavement are two stone coffin lids with crosses, and a small brass; and in the churchyard is a remarkable stone of considerable thickness, shaped like a cross, and about six feet long. In 1848 some curious paintings were discovered on the north wall of the church, representing the seven deadly sins, St Christopher, the Crucifixion, St Michael, Our Saviour before Pilate, and other subjects, treated with great spirit, and displaying a tolerable knowledge of art. There is a piscina in the chancel and a stoup-niche in the porch. An organ was purchased in 1861 by subscription. Mrs Anna Maria Shepheard is lady patron of the rectory, which was valued in the King's Book at £5 6s. 8d. and is now in the incumbency of the Rev. John Bartholomew Vale, M.A., who has a good residence, 13½ acres of glebe, and a yearly rent-charge of £150, awarded in 1838 in lieu of tithes.

At the time of the 1841 census, the surnames recorded for Crostwight are Atkins, Bacon, Burton, Cinlon, Colman, Crowe, Flowerday, Frary, Furnace, Hubbard, Lane, Jarvis, Mays, Salmon, Reed, Shephard, Webster and Wright.

At the census of 1921, the parish's population was seventy-one, and by 1931 it had fallen to sixty-one. On 1 April 1935, Crostwight was abolished as a civil parish and incorporated into its larger neighbour, Honing.

The parish records, dating from 1698 to 1988, are held by the Norfolk Record Office at its Archive Centre in Martineau Lane, Norwich.

== Church of All Saints ==
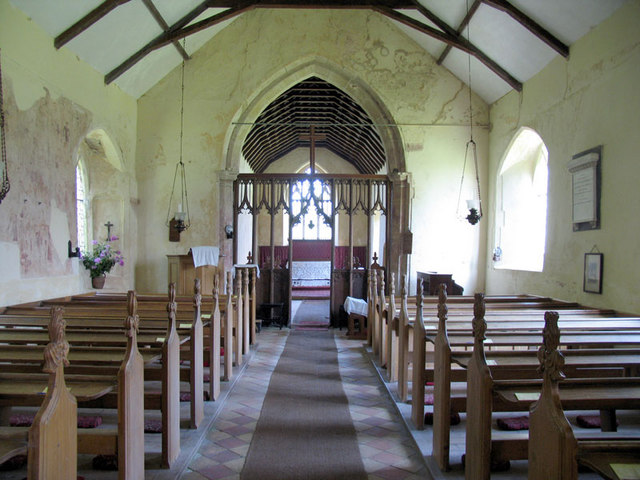
Nave of the church, medieval paintings at left

The parish church stands on its own not far from the Old Rectory, but is distant from the rest of the village. It is grade I listed.

In 1810, Charles Parkin wrote of the church:

The CHURCH of Crostweyt is dedicated to All-Saints, and is a rectory; it appears by a fine levied in the 20th of Henry III. that the advowson was appendant to the manor of Walcote and then belonged to Lecia de Eggefend, widow of William Rosceline, and was excepted in her grant of Walcote manor, to Roger de Turkelby for life. In the reign of Edward I. Sir Peter Roscelyn was lord and patron: the rector had a manse and 20 acres (81,000 m^{2}) of land, and was valued at 5 l. - Peter-pence 5d. The church is a single pile covered with reed, and has a square tower, with 3 bells, and has a chancel covered with reed.

John Marius Wilson's Imperial Gazetteer of England and Wales (1870–1872) says of it: "The living is a rectory in the diocese of Norwich. Value, £66. Patron, M. Shephard, Esq. The church is old but good, and has a tower."

The church has a series of late medieval wall-paintings (see below). Its massive tower of flint and local stone was reduced in height in 1910, after ivy had made part of it unsafe, and the bells were hung lower. Inside the church is a rood screen carved with dragons, wild men, and flying hearts, but the carving may be modern or restored. The chancel arch, like some walls, is decorated with paintings, but not the screen. There is an octagonal Purbeck stone font, which stands on pillars and on a substantial two-tier octagonal base. The church has no electricity and is lit by oil lamps. The church is a Grade I listed building .

Crostwight lost only one man during the Second World War, and he is commemorated by his own memorial inside the church, which reads: "In honoured memory of HUBERT ARTHUR FRANCIS, who gave his life aboard H.M.S. Royal Oak at Scapa Flow 14th October 1939 Faithful unto death".

Despite the smallness of its ecclesiastical parish, the church is still used. Crostwight is now part of the Church of England united benefice of 'Smallburgh with Dilham with Honing and Crostwight', which has a rector.

== The Crostwight Passion Cycle ==
The medieval wall paintings on the church's north wall date from the late 14th or early 15th century and have been called the Crostwight Passion Cycle. An article at paintedchurch.org considers that this is "...despite its fragmentary condition, one of the most interesting Passion Cycles in England".

All of the scenes are in fragments and few are clear. The order of the scenes is illogical, beginning on the bottom left with Christ's Entry into Jerusalem. To the right of that is the Last Supper, and further right comes the Washing of Feet. Above is the Arrest in Gethsemane, and to the right of that a scene which may be Christ before Herod or Pilate, then the Crowning with Thorns, above which is the Crucifixion. This includes one of the crucified thieves, and behind him is the Roman Stephaton with a bucket of vinegar and a spear. On a lower tier, underneath the Last Supper, is the Ascension. In the splay of a window is the Agony in the Garden, with Christ kneeling in the foreground, St Peter, St James and St John the Apostle behind him. Above this are the remains of another scene which may be the Resurrection.

== Other paintings ==
Other paintings in the parish church include one of the Seven Deadly Sins. This is estimated to date from the late fourteenth century and was discovered in the 1840s by a Mr Gunn. It centres on a tree growing out of the jaws of hell, which appears as the mouth of a giant fish, full of sinners who are being pushed down into hell by a devil. Above, the seven deadly sins grow on the tree like fruit. One of these is clearly marked in Latin with the name of one of the deadly sins, Socordia, or Sloth.

Another painting shows two women approaching the gates of Heaven, with an angel to greet them and a devil watching from below. Sir Nikolaus Pevsner suggests that this is a warning against gossip, and it has also been compared to a church painting at Swanbourne which is an allegory of penitent and unpenitent souls.

In June 1848, The Gentleman's Magazine noted that Dawson Turner had exhibited to the Society of Antiquaries "two sets of drawings, illustrative of the fresco paintings, and other ancient remains, in the parish churches of Gateley and Crostwight, in the county of Norfolk." Turner later reported on the Seven Deadly Sins and other paintings at Crostwight in the Norfolk and Norwich Archaeological Society's Norfolk Archaeology for 1849, with drawings by Mrs Gunn.

== Crostwight Hall ==
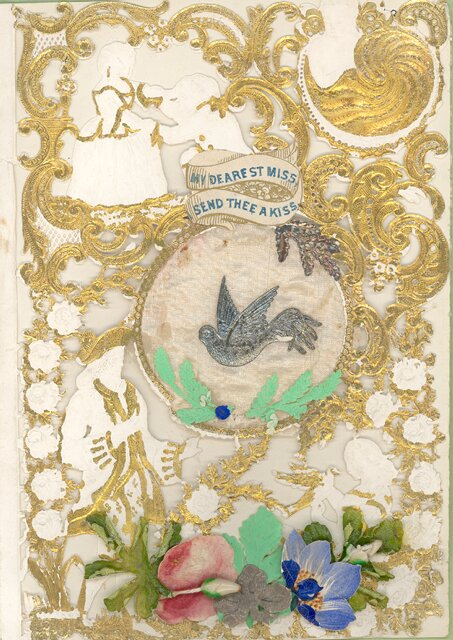
Valentine to Miss Jenny of Crostwight Hall, 1862

Crostwight Hall is a notable country house and is described by Michael Sayer in Burke's & Savills Guide to Country Houses (Volume III, East Anglia). Its garden is one of thirty-three Historic Parks and Gardens listed in the Local Plan for North Norfolk. The historic main house, Old Crostwight Hall, was considered as a project by the Norfolk Historic Buildings Trust but was instead rebuilt by a developer.

The house has sometimes been called 'Crostwick Hall', for instance in Parkin's Essay Towards a Topographical History of the County of Norfolk (1810), where it is called "an agreeable old seat".

The Strangers' Hall Museum at Norwich has an unusual survival from the mid-19th century: an anonymous St Valentine's Day card dated and postmarked 1862, said by the museum to be addressed to "Miss Jenny Lowe [query Love], Crostwight Hall, Smallburgh, Norfolk". The coloured card is embossed with couples, cherubs and roses, and in the middle is a silver bird on a silk panel. On the pictorial side of the card are the printed words "My dearest Miss, I send thee a kiss", and on the other is written by hand "Good Morrow Valentine". As the Hall was then occupied by the Lane family, the addressee may be Miss Jenny Lane.

== Geography ==
Crostwight Heath (dense acidic scrubland) and Crostwight Common (broad-leaved coppiced semi-natural woodland) are both designated in the North Norfolk Local Plan as County Wildlife Sites.

== List of rectors of Crostwight ==
To 1756:

- 1300: Ralph de Somerton, presented by Sir Peter Roscelyn
- 1305: ( - ) de Billokby
- 1313: Robert de Warham
- 1313: Richard de Halesworth, presented by Sir Peter Roscelyn
- 1335: John Taillor, by Sim. Kemyng
- 1348: William de Ely, by John Kenyng
- 1373: Nich. Lomb, by Joan, widow of John Costeyn
- 1389: Roger de Holand
- 1391: William Nethergate, by John Costeyn
- 1404: John Blake, by Margery, widow of Henry de Betele
- 1413: Henry Lesyngham, by John Elmham
- 1414: Richard Newman, by Thomas Derham
- 1447: Robert Casmond, by Nicholas Waterman
- 1449: John Bullock, by Nicholas Waterman, gent.
- 1452: John Leigh
- 1461: Robert Wilkys, by Henry Heydon and Thomas Brampton
- 1483: Thomas Curteys, by John Bishop
- 1484: John Rudham
- 1493: Roger Humfrey
- 1493: Thomas Lyng, by Sir John Paston
- 1497: Thomas Miles, by John Bishop
- 1503: John Trew, by Robert Harridaunce, Esq.
- 1510: Stephen Drury
- 1556: Robert Lindley, by Margaret Bishop, widow
- 1557: Robert Best
- 1579: William Olyver, by Thomas Groos, Esq.
- 1598: Edmund Alphen
- 1602: Thomas Cannam, by Thomas Groos, Esq.
- 1630: Thomas Ramsey, by Sir Charles le Groos
- 1665: Thomas Falke, by Thomas le Groos, Esq.
- 16--: Charles Spicer
- 1669: And. Call.
- 1672: Valentine Husband, by Robert Tutpill, gent.
- 1674: Henry Gooch
- 1687: Bambridge Dean, by Charles le Groos alias Harman, Esq.
- 1694: John Rolfe
- 17--: Noah Violas
- 1720: Mundeford Spelman (on the death of Violas), presented by Charles Harman alias le Gross, Esq.
- 1736: John Wakeman, by Robert, Lord Walpole
- 1753: Thomas Batman, by Margaret, Countess of Orford
- 1754: James Adamson, by John Sharp, Esq. (hac vice)
- 1756: Thomas Hutchingson, by the Bishop (a lapse)

After 1756:

- fl. 1845: Henry Atkinson
- fl. 1883: John Bartholomew Vale (1823–96)
- fl. 1899: H. G. Corner

== Governance ==
Corpusty is part of the electoral ward of Happisburgh for local elections and is part of the district of North Norfolk.

The village's national constituency is North Norfolk, which has been represented by the Liberal Democrat Steff Aquarone MP since 2024.

== War Memorial ==
Crostwight's war memorials are two marble plaques inside All Saints' Church. The memorial lists the following names for the First World War:

Rank	Name	Unit	Date of death	Burial/Commemoration
LCpl.	Frederick W. Green	8th Bn., Norfolk Regiment	12 Mar. 1917	Aveluy Cemetery
Gdsm.	Walter Burton	2nd Bn., Grenadier Guards	1 May 1918	Bagneux Cemetery
Pte.	Edmund Earle	1st Bn., Norfolk Regiment	4 Oct. 1917	Hooge Crater Cemetery
Pte.	Mornia G. Burton	9th Bn., Norfolk Regt.	15 Sep. 1916	Thiepval Memorial
Pte.	George W. Chamberlain	10th Bn., Norfolk Regt.	16 Feb. 1915	Walton Cemetery

And, the following for the Second World War:

Rank	Name	Unit	Date of death	Burial/Commemoration
AS	Hubert A. Francis	HMS Royal Oak	14 Oct. 1939	Portsmouth Naval Memorial
