= Broad Fen, Dilham =

Site of Special Scientific Interest in Norfolk, England

Coordinates: 52.774°N 1.471°E

- Site of Special Scientific Interest
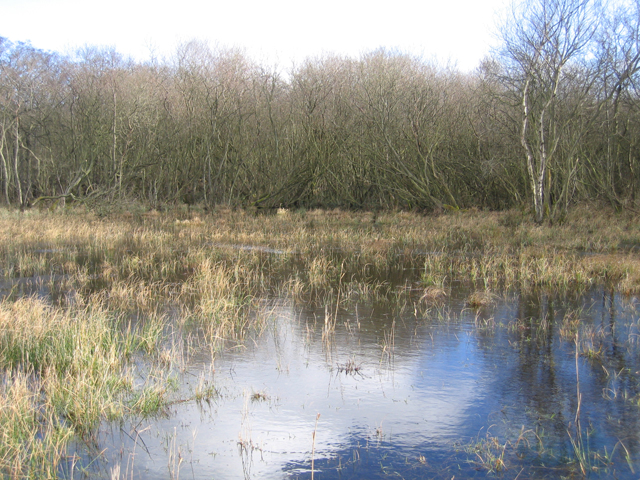
- Location of Broad Fen, Dilham.
- Area of search: Norfolk
- Grid reference: TG 342 253
- Interest: Biological
- Area: 38.4 hectares (95 acres)
- Notification date: 1983
- Location map: Magic Map

Broad Fen, Dilham is a 38.4-hectare (95-acre) biological Site of Special Scientific Interest north-east of Norwich in Norfolk, England. It is part of the Broadland Ramsar site and Special Protection Area and The Broads Special Area of Conservation.

This site's diverse habitats include fen, carr woodland, open water and fen meadows. The open water includes ponds which were dug to attract wildfowl, a stretch of the Dilham Canal and dykes. Aquatic plants include bladderwort and white water lily.
