= Barton House Railway =

Miniature railway in Wroxham

Coordinates: 52.70810°N 1.40908°E

The Barton House Railway (BHR) is a miniature railway in Wroxham, Norfolk; it is open on the third Sunday of each month from April until October, plus special events throughout the year.

== History ==
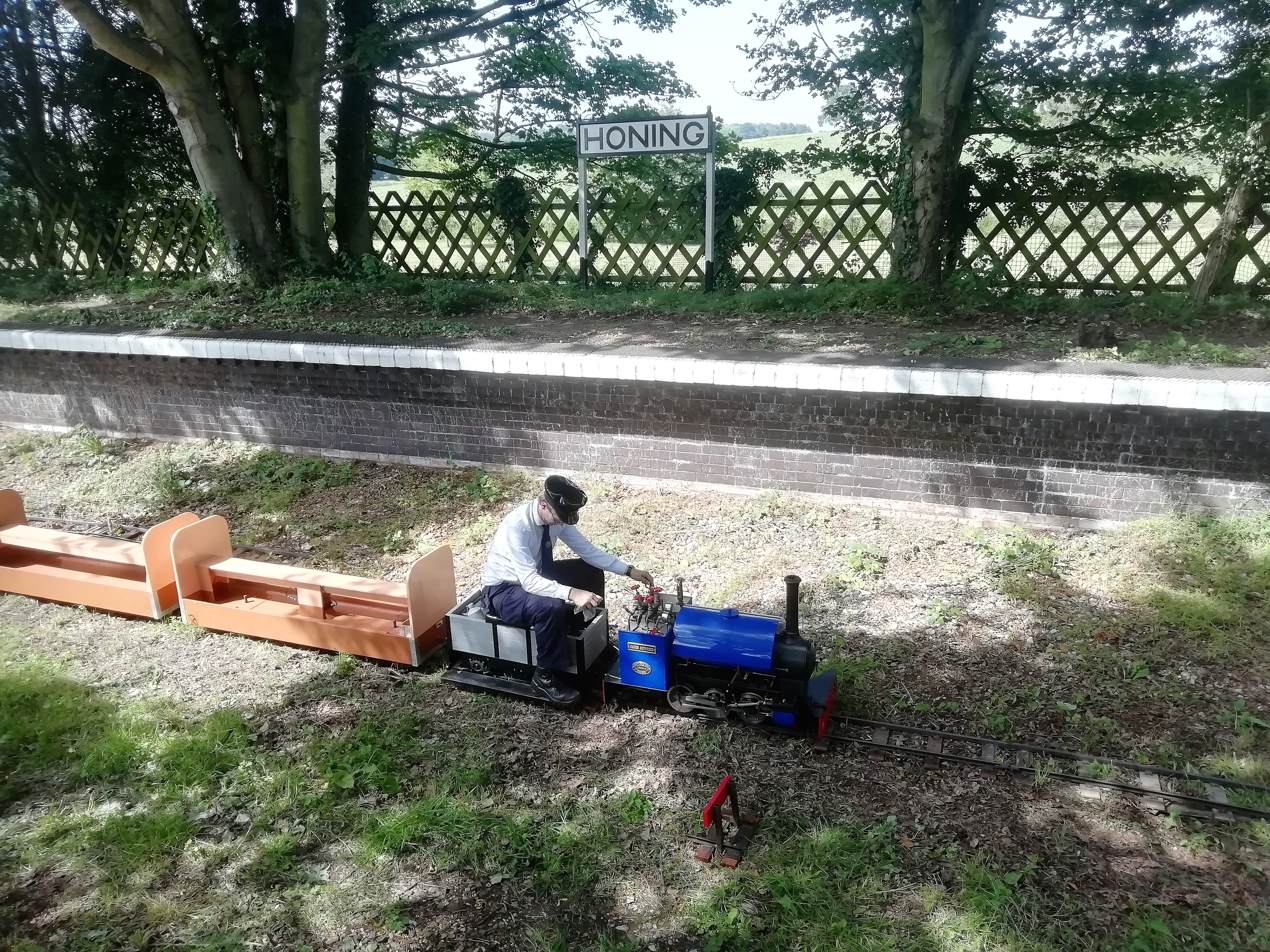
BHR passenger train visiting Honing station, 2019

The initial 3 1/2 in (89 mm) gauge track was laid in 1960; the railway opened to the public in 1963, and began to raise money for local charities.

In 1967 the Midland & Great Northern Joint Railway Honing East Signal box was rebuilt at Barton House Railway having been carefully dismantled from its original home at Honing railway station where it had stood since 1901. Mid-August 2017, Barton House Railway staged a ceremony for Honing East Signal box for its 50th anniversary at its new home.

A new 7 1/4 in (184 mm) gauge Riverside Railway was added in 1979. In mid-2012, Barton House Railway started to create a new line from the museum to the top lawn by the booking office; this line is still under construction.

In 2013, Barton House Railway held their 50th Special anniversary, with celebrations happening all over the year from April to October. In 2019 the BHR created a temporary running line at Honing railway station, marking 60 years since the closure of the M&GN route.
