= Dilham Castle =

Castle in Norfolk, England

- Norfolk, England
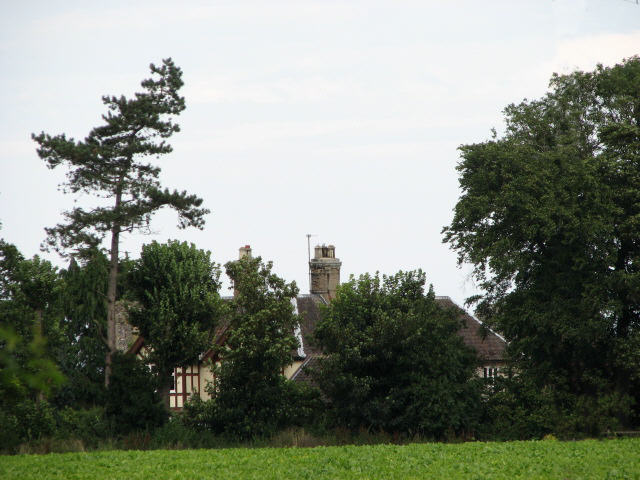
- Dilham Castle (at left), amongst the buildings of Hall Farm

Site information
- Type: Fortified manor house
- Owner: Private
- Condition: Intact

Location
- Shown within Norfolk
- Location within Norfolk
- Coordinates: 52.78319°N 1.45950°E

Site history
- Materials: Stone and brick

Dilham Castle, also called Dilham Hall, is situated in the village of Dilham, near Stalham in Norfolk, England.

== Details ==
Dilham Castle was built in the 15th century by Sir Henry Inglose, probably around the same time as nearby Caister Castle. Inglose had served in France under Henry V and was a client of Sir John Falstof, who later became a knight of the Garter. Inglose married Anne de Gyney, a member of a prominent Dilham family. The castle took the form of a fortified manor house and probably originally included two pentagonal towers, possibly forming a gateway, and an external wall, made of flint stone and brick.

By 1904, only one of the towers and part of the wall remained, with the surviving tower having been restored using more modern brick and cement. Today the remains lie within Hall Farm and are a grade II listed building and are a scheduled monument. In 2009 the condition of the site was regarded as poor by English Heritage, due to the damage to the tower from vegetation.

== See also ==
- Castles in Great Britain and Ireland
- List of castles in England

== Exetneral link ==
- Bibliography of sources relating to Dilham Castle
