= Honing railway station =

Former railway station in Norfolk, England

Coordinates: 52.7963°N 1.4356°E

Honing
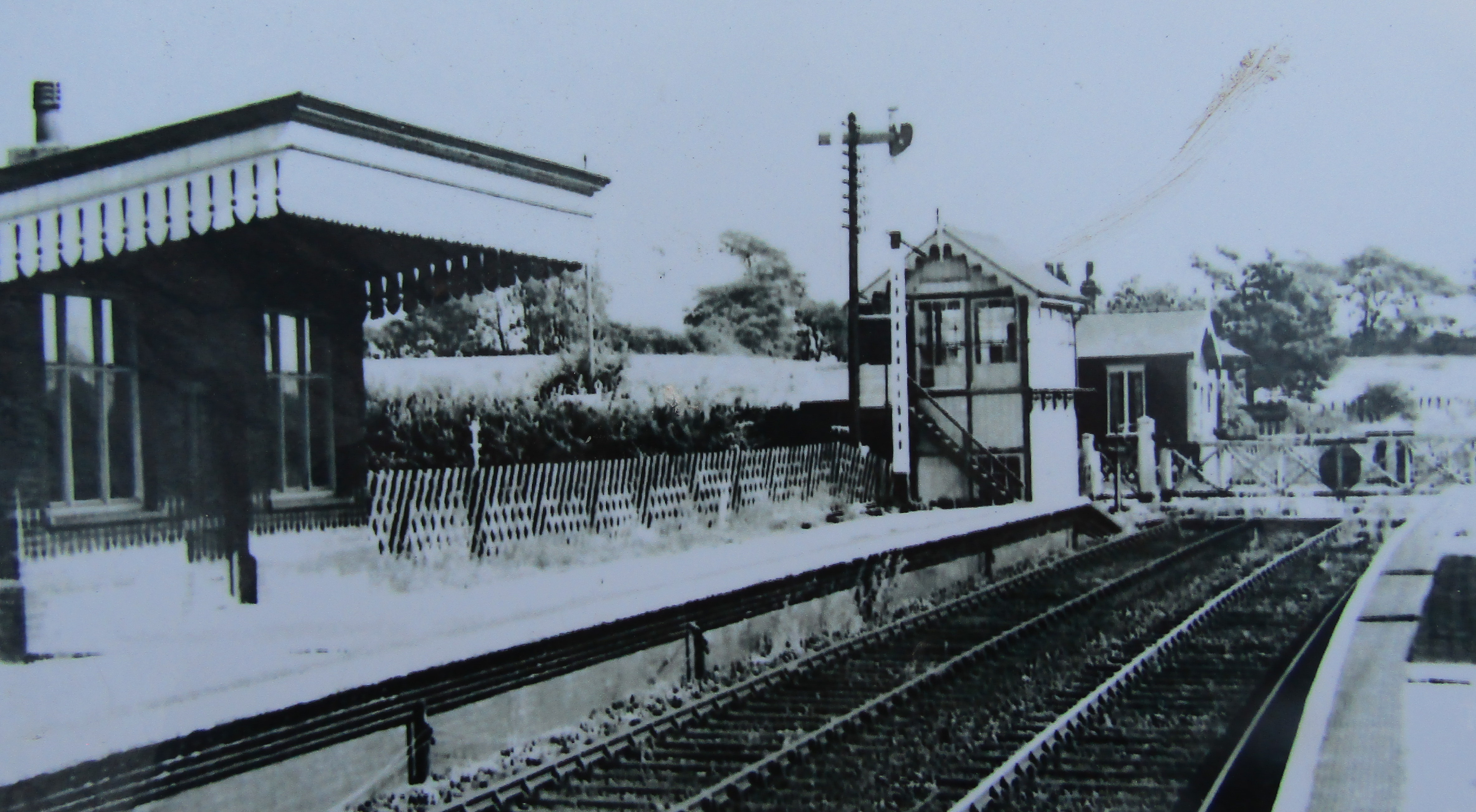
- Honing railway station platforms, 1905

General information
- Location: Honing, North Norfolk; England
- Grid reference: TG317275
- Platforms: 2

Other information
- Status: Disused

History
- Pre-grouping: Yarmouth & North Norfolk Railway; Midland and Great Northern Joint Railway
- Post-grouping: Midland and Great Northern Joint Railway; Eastern Region of British Railways

Key dates
- 1 August 1882: Opened
- 2 March 1959: Closed
Location

Honing railway station served the small village of Honing, in Norfolk, England.

== History ==
The station was a stop on the Midland and Great Northern Joint Railway between Melton Constable and Great Yarmouth.

The track through Honing was opened on 13 June 1881 and the station was inaugurated in the following year in 1882, with one platform. Increased traffic on the line meant further modifications to the station layout and the track between 1899 and 1901, which added a 1/2-mile (0.80 km) crossing loop and a signal box at each end.

It closed in 1959, along with the rest of the line.

Preceding station	Disused railways	Following station
North Walsham Town	Midland and Great Northern; Yarmouth Line	Stalham

== Signal boxes ==
There were two signal boxes in operation, which between them controlled the working of the loop and the road crossings. As part of a modernisation plan, the West signalbox was closed on 22 June 1932.

Honing East signal box was purchased in 1967 for Barton House Railway; it was then dismantled for accurate reassembly at Wroxham. Upon completion, the signal box was brought into commission for signalling Barton House trains in July 1968.

== The site today ==
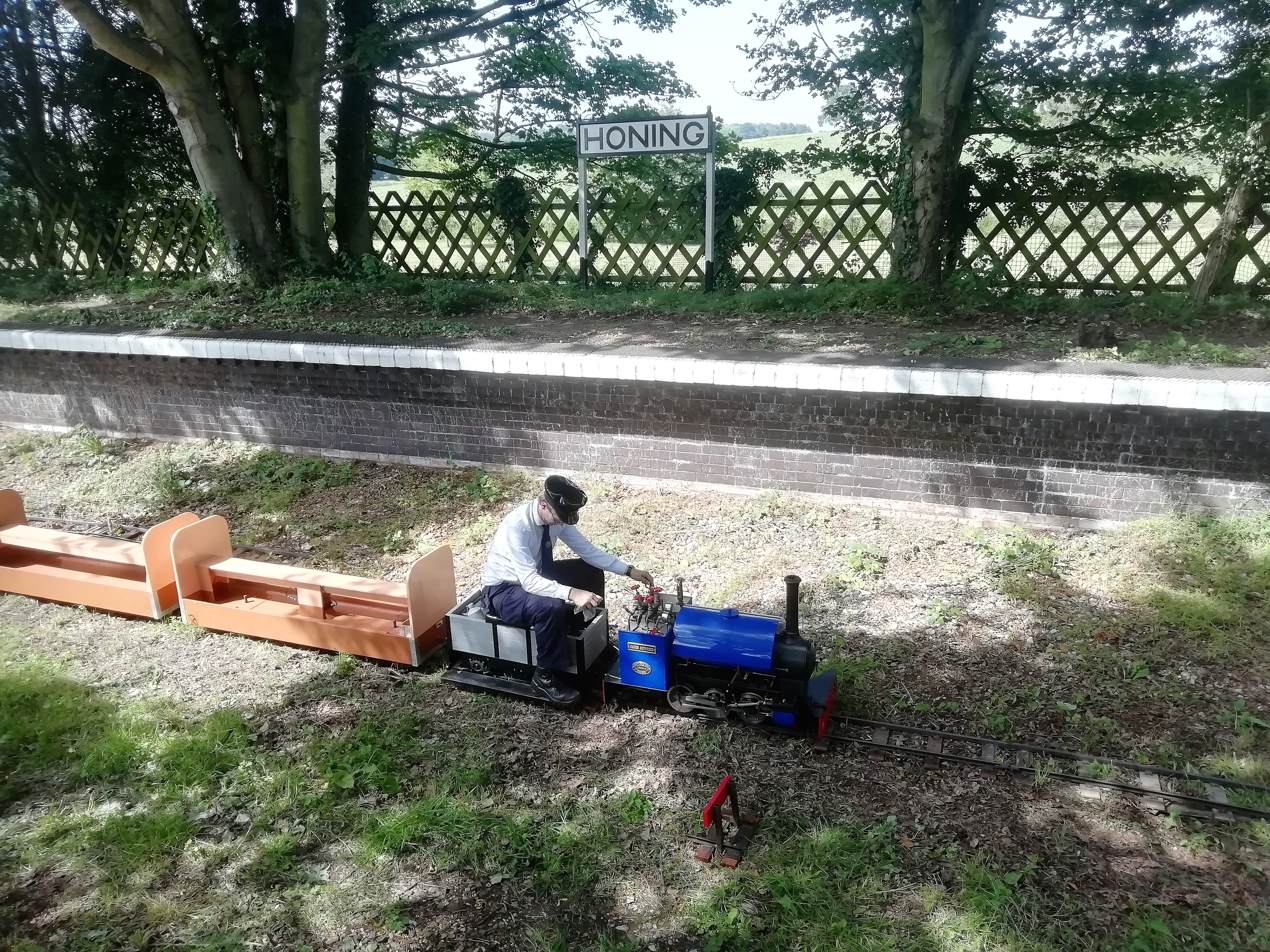
A narrow gauge passenger train operating through Honing station, marking 60 years since the closure of the line; 29 June 2019

The two platforms and remains of the waiting room and its cellar, complete with two fireplaces, survive. The remains of the station building foundations are extant, along with the signal box and a hand water pump inside a small shed. Alongside the waiting room side platform is lattice fencing, typical of M&GN stations.

The station site is currently being worked on by the Norfolk Railway Heritage Group, in conjunction with the Norfolk County Council, to expose and preserve the remains.

On 29 June 2019, the formation between the platforms was relaid temporarily and 7¼" gauge passenger services were operated by the Barton House Railway.
