= Dilham =

Village in Norfolk, England

Coordinates: 52.76815°N 1.45618°E

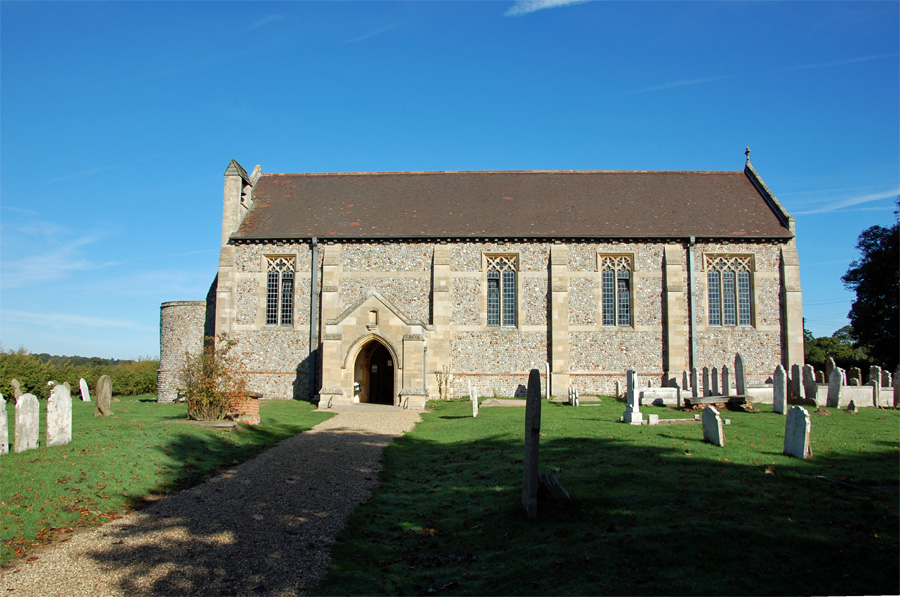
- St. Nicholas' Church

- Location within Norfolk
- Area: 6.54 km^{2} (2.53 sq mi)
- Population: 331 (2021 census)
  - Density: 51/km^{2} (130/sq mi)
- OS grid reference: TG332245
  - London: 110 miles
- Civil parish: Dilham
- District: North Norfolk
- Shire county: Norfolk
- Region: East
- Country: England
- Sovereign state: United Kingdom
- Post town: NORTH WALSHAM
- Postcode district: NR28
- Dialling code: 01692
- Police: Norfolk
- Fire: Norfolk
- Ambulance: East of England
- UK Parliament: North Norfolk

Dilham is a village and civil parish in the English county of Norfolk.

The village is located 4.3 miles (6.9 km) south-east of North Walsham and 12 miles (19 km) north-east of Norwich, along the course of the River Ant.

== History ==
Dilham's name is of Anglo-Saxon origin, and derives from the Old English for a farmstead or homestead with an abundance of dill.

In the Domesday Book of 1086, Dilham is listed as a settlement of 23 households in the hundred of Tunstead. In 1086, the village was divided between the estates of Alan of Brittany, Robert Malet, Roger Bigod and St Benet's Abbey.

Nearby Dilham Castle was built in the fifteenth century as a fortified manor house for Sir Henry Inglose; all that remains of the castle is the Grade II listed tower currently attached to Hall Farm.

During the Second World War, the North Walsham and Dilham Canal was designated as a line of defence against a possible German invasion which meant that bunkers, barbed wire and mortar-emplacements were built in the parish.

== Geography ==
According to the 2021 census, Dilham has a population of 331 people which shows a small increase from the 319 people recorded in the 2011 census.

Dilham marks the limit of Broads navigation for larger boats, but smaller boats can continue on the North Walsham and Dilham Canal until Honing.

== St. Nicholas' Church ==
Dilham's parish church is dedicated to Saint Nicholas and was re-built in the 1930s. St. Nicholas' is located outside of the village on Church Road.

== Governance ==
Dilham is part of the electoral ward of Hoveton & Tunstead for local elections and is part of the district of North Norfolk.

The village's national constituency is North Norfolk, which has been represented by the Liberal Democrat Steff Aquarone MP since 2024.

== War Memorial ==
Dilham's war memorials are two marble plaques inside St. Nicholas' Church. The memorials list the following names for the First World War:

Rank	Name	Unit	Date of death	Burial/Commemoration
Lt.	William J. Faulke	9th Bn., Norfolk Regiment	21 Mar. 1918	Arras Memorial
LCpl.	Harold Fiske	2nd Bn., Essex Regiment	15 Jul. 1918	Niederzwehren Cemetery
Pte.	Frederick W. Durrant	7th Bn., Border Regiment	20 Nov. 1917	Tyne Cot
Pte.	Arthur Morter	1st Bn., Essex Regiment	13 Aug. 1915	Helles Memorial
Pte.	Sidney Morter	1st Bn., Essex Regt.	13 Aug. 1915	Helles Memorial
Pte.	Lawson J. Dewing	29th Bn., Middlesex Regiment	25 Feb. 1919	St. Nicholas' Churchyard

And, the following for the Second World War:

Rank	Name	Unit	Date of death	Burial
Bdr.	Gilbert Hannant	1st Regt., Royal Horse Artillery	29 May 1942	Knightsbridge War Cemetery
Gnr.	Bertie Mortimer	72 (Anti-tank) Regt., Royal Artillery	4 Jun. 1944	Caserta War Cemetery
Pte.	Basil A. Golder	4th Bn., Royal Norfolk Regiment	13 Feb. 1942	Kranji War Cemetery
Pte.	Sidney H. Fiske	6th Bn., Royal Norfolks.	26 Jan. 1942	Kranji War Memorial
Pte.	Alexander Simpson	7th Bn., Royal Norfolks.	12 Jun. 1940	St. Marie's Cemetery
