= Honing, Norfolk =

Village in Norfolk, England

Coordinates: 52.797°N 1.45045°E

Honing
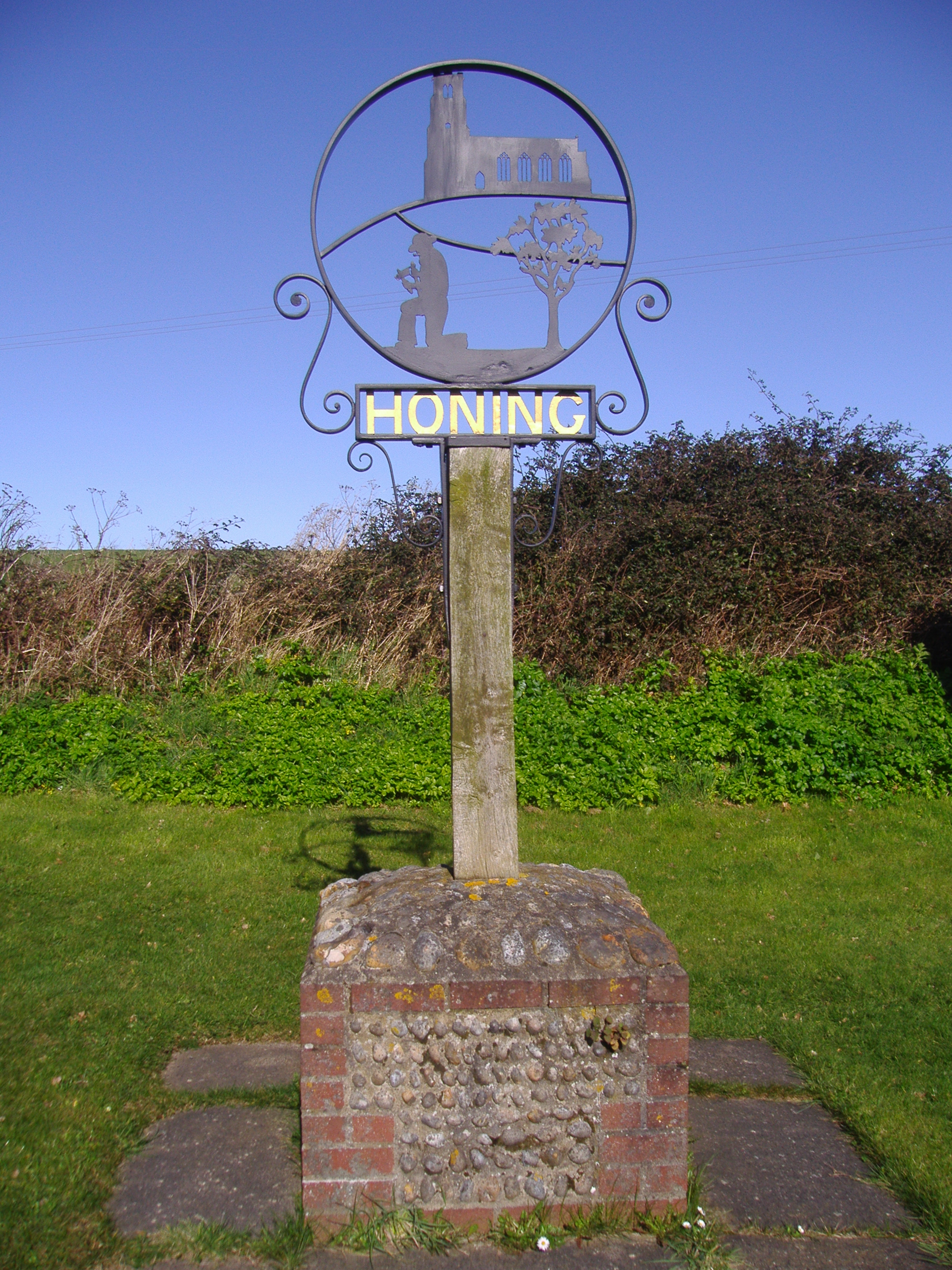
- Honing village sign

- Location within Norfolk
- Area: 3.40 sq mi (8.8 km^{2})
- Population: 310 (2021 census)
  - Density: 91/sq mi (35/km^{2})
  - London: 135 miles (217 km)
- Civil parish: Honing CP
- District: North Norfolk
- Shire county: Norfolk
- Region: East
- Country: England
- Sovereign state: United Kingdom
- Post town: NORTH WALSHAM
- Postcode district: NR28
- Dialling code: 01692
- UK Parliament: North Norfolk

Honing is a village and civil parish in the English county of Norfolk. The civil parish also includes the village of Crostwight.

Honing is located 13 miles (21 km) south-east of Cromer and 15 miles (24 km) north-east of Norwich.

== History ==
Honing's name is of Anglo-Saxon origin and derives from the Old English for the people of the stone.

In the Domesday Book of 1086, Honing is listed as a settlement of 32 households in the hundred of Tunstead. In 1086, the village was divided between the East Anglian estates of St Benet's Abbey and Ranulf, son of Ilger.

Honing Railway Station opened in 1882 on the Midland and Great Northern Joint Railway, running services between Yarmouth Beach and Norwich. The station closed in 1959.

After the First World War, Honing was given a German 25 cm schwerer Minenwerfer trench mortar as a war trophy. It stood outside Honing Post Office until it was given to Strumpshaw Hall Steam Museum, circa 1970. It was returned in 2014 and stands outside the village hall.

== Geography ==
According to the 2021 census, Honing civil parish has a population of 310 people, a decrease from the 312 people recorded in the 2011 census.

The North Walsham and Dilham Canal passes through the civil parish.

== Church of St Peter and St Paul ==
Honing's parish church is jointly dedicated to Saint Peter and Saint Paul and dates from the 15th century. St Peter & St Paul's is located on Long Lane and has been Grade II listed since 1955. The church holds occasional Sunday service.

The church holds numerous memorials to the Cubitt family, including one to Edward G. Cubitt who fought at the Battle of Vitoria, Siege of Pamplona and Battle of Toulouse during the Peninsular War.

== Honing Hall ==
Honing Hall was built by the Chambers family in the mid-18th century and then later acquired by Thomas Cubitt. Later extensions were made by John Soane and improvements to the gardens were made on the recommendations by Humphry Repton.

== Governance ==
Honing is part of the electoral ward of Happisburgh for local elections and is part of the district of North Norfolk.

The village's national constituency is North Norfolk, which has been represented by the Liberal Democrat Steff Aquarone since 2024.

== War memorial ==
Honing War Memorial is a large Latin cross in the churchyard of St Peter & St Paul which was funded by public subscription and erected by Cornish and Gaymer of North Walsham. The memorial was unveiled in 1919 by Bertram Pollock, Bishop of Norwich. The memorial lists the following names for the First World War:

Rank	Name	Unit	Date of death	Burial/Commemoration
Capt.	Edward R. Cubitt	5th Bn., Norfolk Regiment	12 Aug. 1915	Helles Memorial
Capt.	Eustace H. Cubitt	5th Bn., Norfolk Regt.	19 Apr. 1917	Gaza War Cemetery
Lt.	Victor M. Cubitt	5th Bn., Norfolk Regt.	12 Aug. 1915	Helles Memorial
Sjt.	Robert Jarvis	4th Bn., Norfolk Regt.	2 Nov. 1917	Jerusalem Memorial
Pte.	Charles H. Flaxman	8th Bn., Bedfordshire Regiment	13 Oct. 1916	Thiepval Memorial
Pte.	Herbert S. Flaxman	10th Bn., Cheshire Regiment	9 Oct. 1916	Regina Trench Cemetery
Pte.	Archibald C. Flaxman	2nd Bn., Norfolk Regiment	6 Mar. 1916	Basra Memorial
Pte.	Donald G. Beck	7th Bn., Norfolk Regt.	22 Sep. 1917	Duisans British Cemetery
Pte.	John R. Meek	1st Bn., Northamptonshire Regiment	25 Sep. 1915	Loos Memorial
Pte.	Sidney J. Thirtle	Queen's Royal Regiment	20 Jun. 1923	Honing Churchyard
Pte.	Reginald Riches	9th Bn., Royal Sussex Regiment	21 Mar. 1918	Pozières Memorial
Pte.	William K. Hannant	16th Bn., Royal Sussex Regt.	21 Sep. 1918	Vis-en-Artois Memorial

== Gallery ==
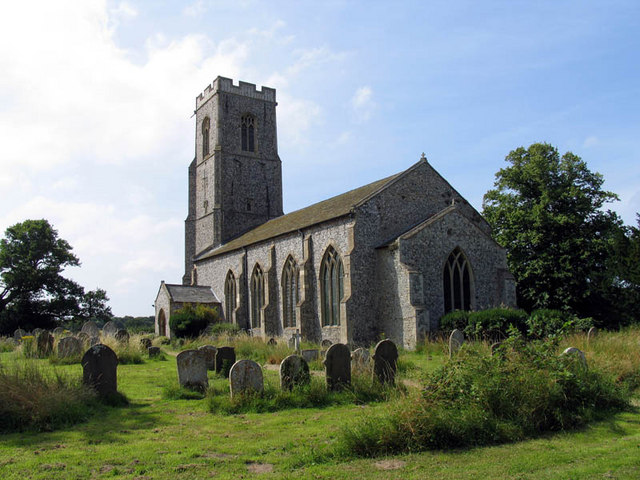
The parish church of Saint Peter and Saint Paul, Honing

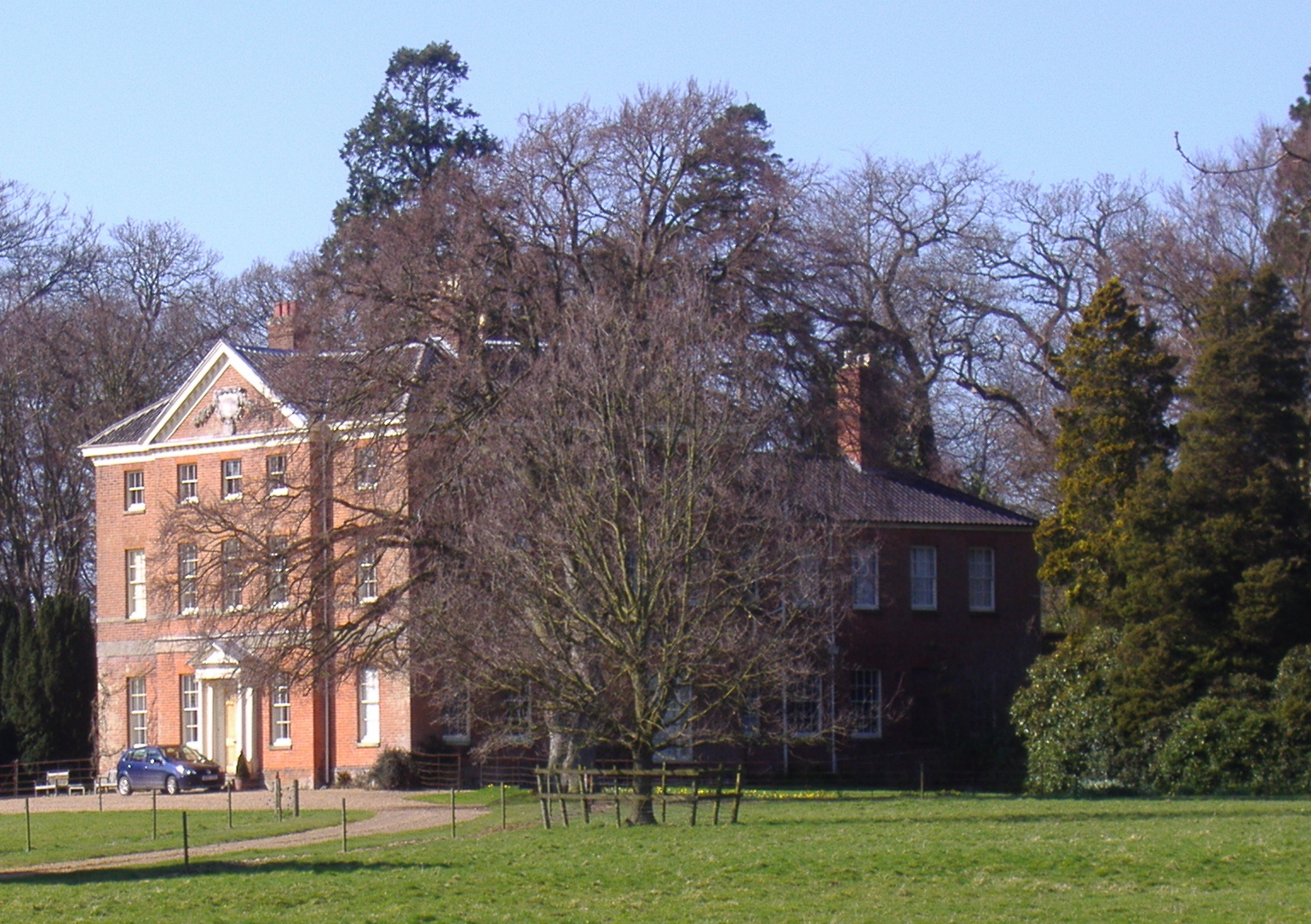
Honing Hall

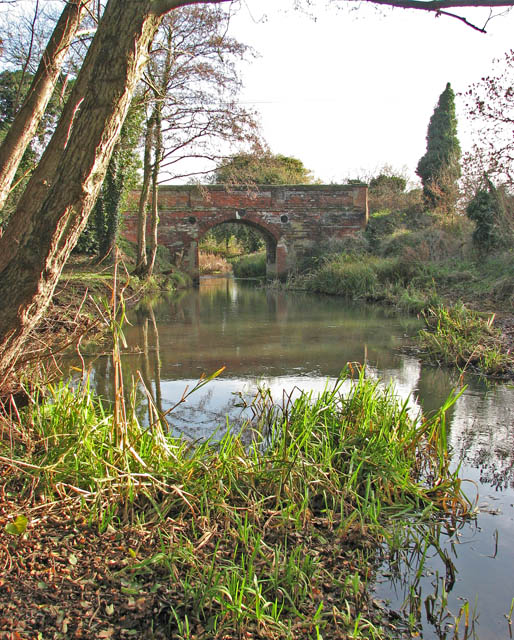
The disused North Walsham and Dilham Canal at Dee Bridge, south of the village

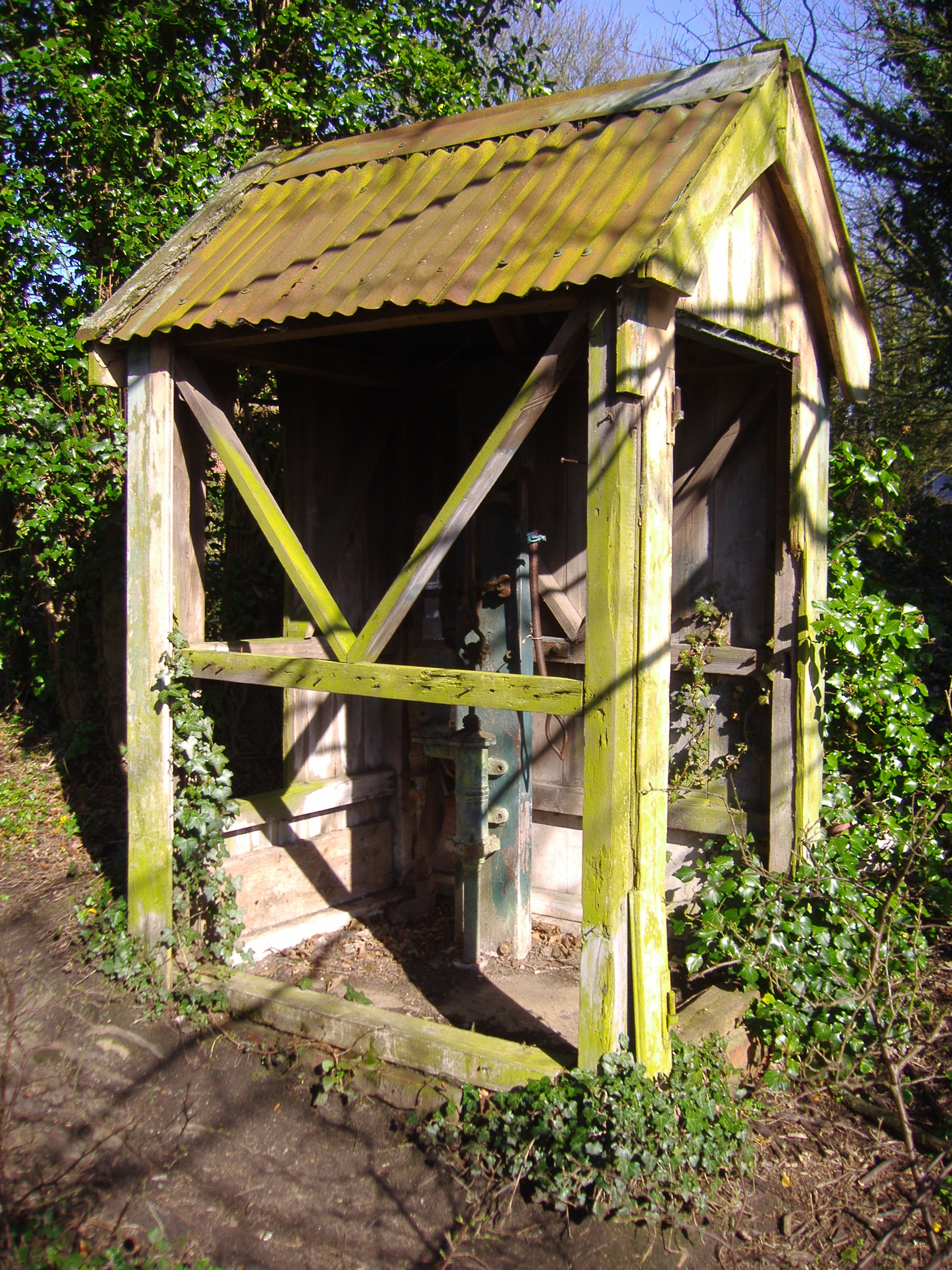
A Water pump on the station platform

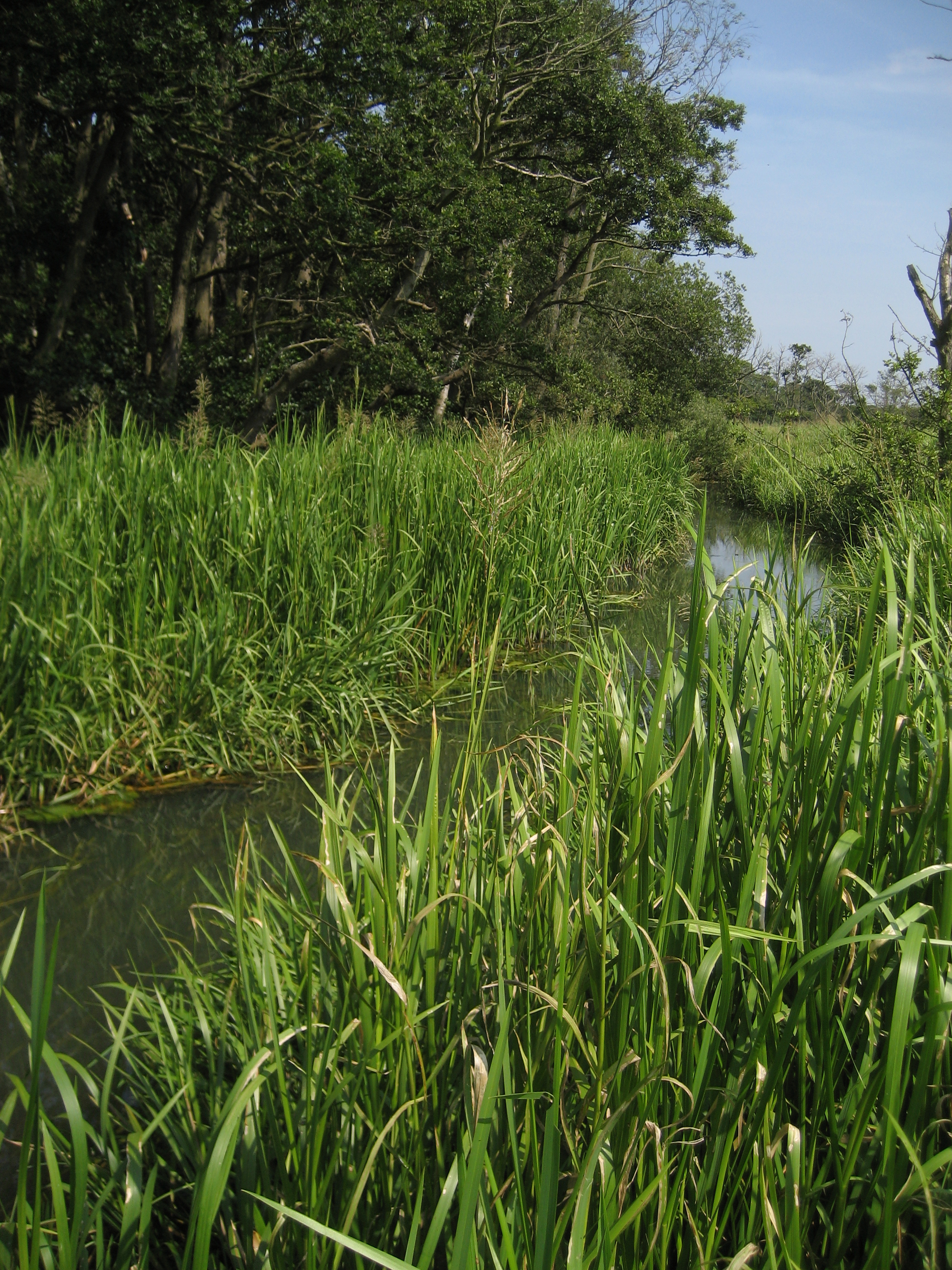
The North Walsham and Dilham Canal near Honing

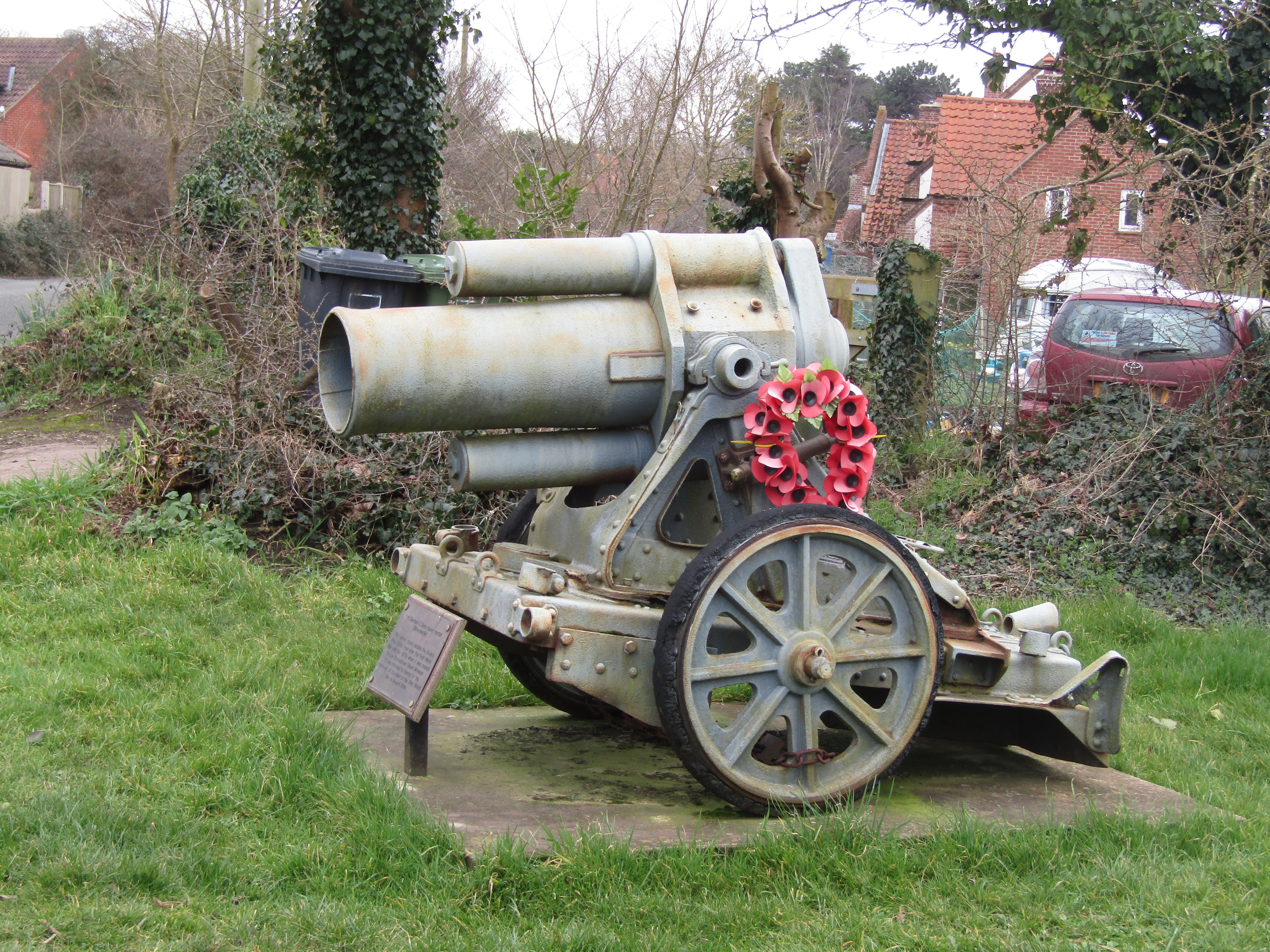
A 1917 German 25 cm schwerer Minenwerfer
