= Smallburgh =

Village in Norfolk, England

Coordinates: 52.76°N 1.45°E

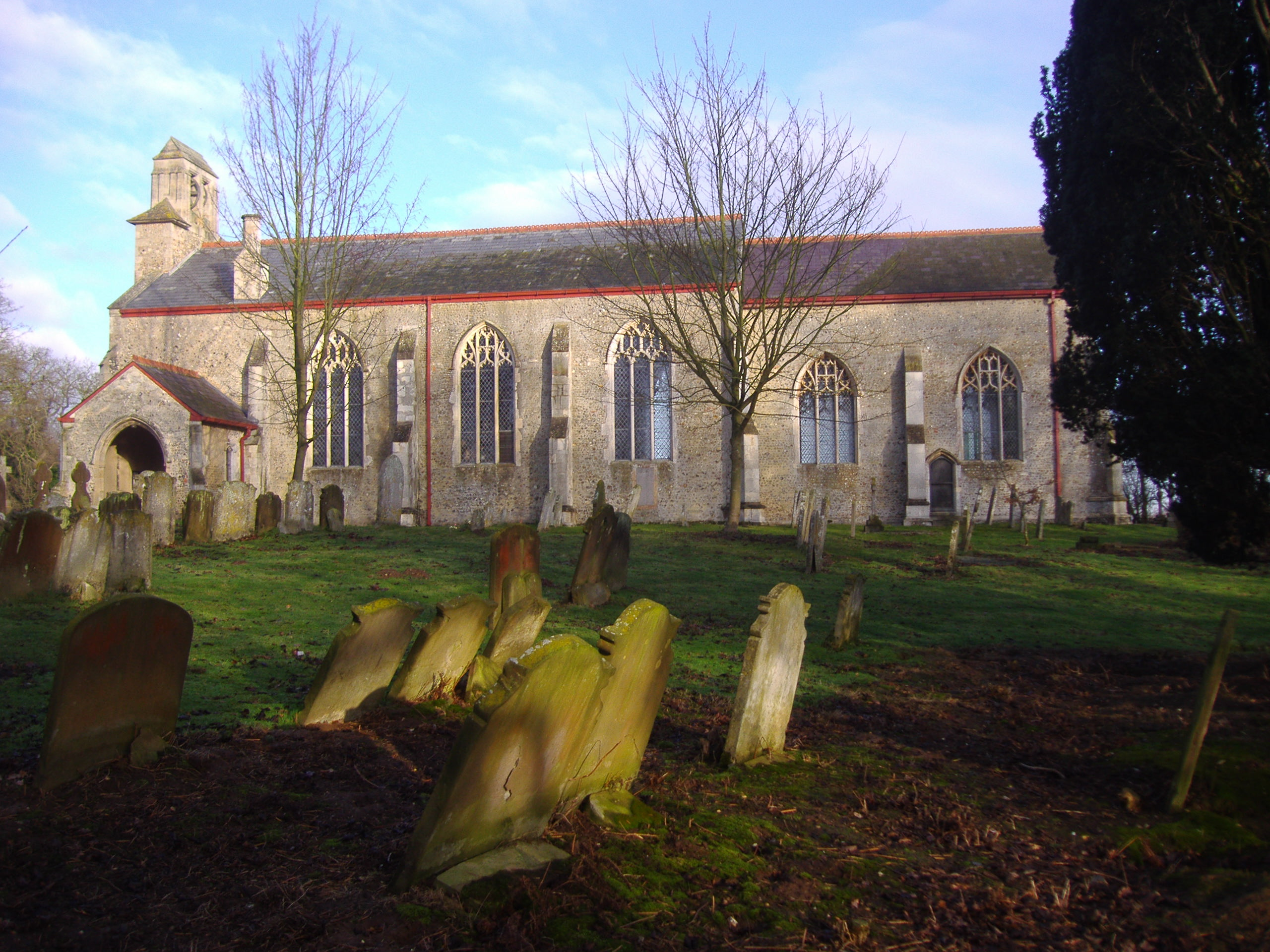
- St Peter's Church, Smallburgh

- Location within Norfolk
- Area: 5.02 km^{2} (1.94 sq mi)
- Population: 509 (parish, 2011 census)
  - Density: 101/km^{2} (260/sq mi)
- OS grid reference: TG331247
  - London: 132 miles (212 km)
- Civil parish: Smallburgh
- District: North Norfolk
- Shire county: Norfolk
- Region: East
- Country: England
- Sovereign state: United Kingdom
- Post town: Norwich
- Postcode district: NR12
- Dialling code: 01692
- Police: Norfolk
- Fire: Norfolk
- Ambulance: East of England
- UK Parliament: North Norfolk

Smallburgh is a village and a civil parish in the English county of Norfolk. The village is fourteen miles (23 km) south-east of Cromer, fourteen miles (23 km) north-east of Norwich and 132 miles (212 km) north-east of London. The village lies five miles (8.0 km) south-east of the nearby town of North Walsham. The nearest railway station is at Worstead for the Bittern Line which runs between Sheringham, Cromer and Norwich. The nearest airport is Norwich International Airport. At the 2001 census it had a population of 518 in 219 households. For the purposes of local government, it falls within the district of North Norfolk.

== Portrait ==
Smallburgh is a sprawling village over an area of 1,255 acres (5.08 km^{2}). The village straddles the A149 road that links King's Lynn to Great Yarmouth. The community is bordered to the north and east by the River Ant and dykes and to the south and west by tracks and hedgerows. The name of the village means 'bank or hillock of the Smale', the Smale being the old name for the River Ant, the second element deriving from Old English beorg which means hillock.

== History ==
It is believed locally that the field to the north of the church was the site of the original Saxon settlement. In the great survey of 1086, known as the Domesday Book, the settlement of Smallburgh is described as being a quiet, small place. There are two entries in the book. The first entry states that a freeman of St Benedict's held IC of Freeland. He gave it to St Benedict before 1066 but still held it from the Abbot. There are 2 villagers with 1.5 lengths of plough land and 2 acres (8,100 m^{2}) of meadow, the value of this being 20 shillings. In the same village were 28 freemen, 1c of land, always 4 ploughs and 1-acre (4,000 m^{2}) of meadow, the value of this being 20s. The whole has 10 furlongs and 12 perches in length and 6 furlongs in width, the tax for this being 1 penny. The second entry recorded that in Smallburgh there are 3 freemen and 1c of land. Always there are 12 smallholdings and 3 freemen. Then and later 3 ploughs, now 4. Two of these are in the valuation of Antingham; the value of the third is 10 shillings.

In 1588 the village was split, there being two main areas of settlement. The first part was the present village centre and the area around Low Street which was a considerable-sized hamlet and this constituted the manor of Smallburgh. The second part was situated at the present Holly House and was known as the manor of Smallburgh Catts. This is because the lord of the manor at that time was Robert Catte. He enclosed much common land, which is why the area towards the Norwich Road is known as Catt's Common. Much of the land in Smallburgh Catts was cultivated in the traditional strip system with a large area of common land to the south and west. The present streets of Union Road and Anchor Street are reputed to be part of a Roman Road leading to the Roman camp near Wayford Bridge.

White's Directory of 1845 states that Smallburgh had two shoemakers, blacksmith, surgeon, Jeremiah Hannant of the Crown Inn was a joiner and victualler, wheelwright, grocer, draper, school mistress and school, a shopkeeper, surgeon, another blacksmith and furrier, tailor, plumber and painter.

White's of 1864 indicates a still-thriving community, with many occupations represented in the village. These include carpenters, bricklayers, plumber, shoemaker, grocer and draper, surgeon and registrar, blacksmith, a master of the workhouse, a mistress of the school, three public or beer houses, carrier, tailor, rector, book-keeper, many farmers and smallholders.

In more recent times the life in the village has changed. Since the end of the Second World War the village has had only one public house, The Crown. The village still retains a church that remains open. However, the school closed in the 1980s and the Post Office closed in the 2000s.

== The Workhouse ==
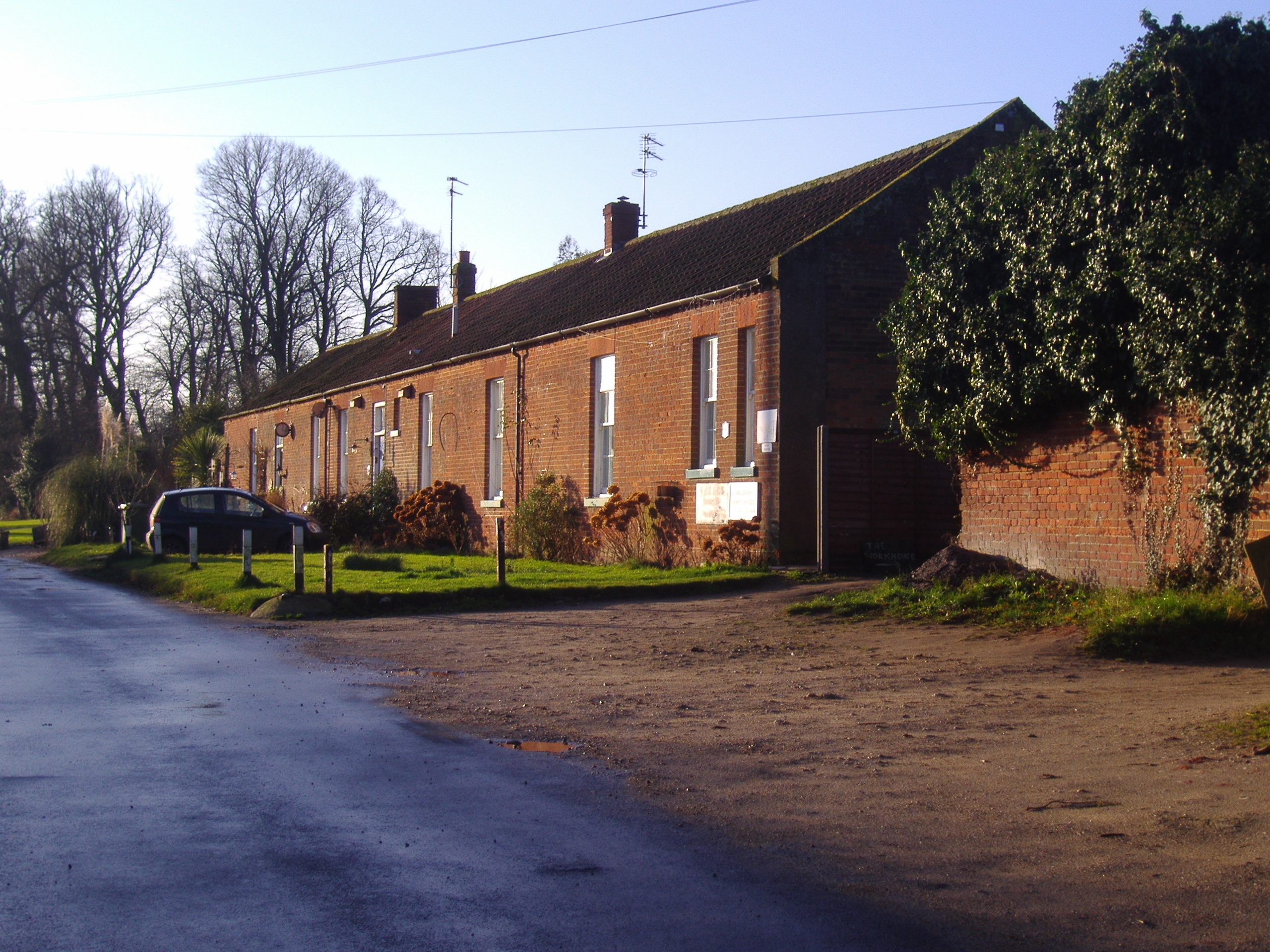
What remains of the workhouse today

A large workhouse was located at the east side of what is still known as Workhouse Road in the village. It was built in 1725 and extended in 1836. It appears to have had a large H-shaped main building with a number of other smaller ancillary buildings. Records indicate that the workhouse could accommodate 800 souls although in 1876 there were only 51 people there; however, the highest number staying there between 1866 and 1876 was 116 in January 1869. Other records show that the annual salaries bill for the officers and those who worked at the Union Workhouse was £293. The Tunstead workhouse issued its own coinage in the form of workhouse tokens in the early 19th century when there was a national shortage of copper coins. The tokens could be spent locally to buy bread and other basic commodities. The graveyard where people were buried when they died in the workhouse lies to the south of the site. The Union Workhouse, for the Hundreds of Tunstead, as it was known, closed its doors when the National Health Service was founded in 1948 and much of the old workhouse was demolished in the 1950s. It is thought that because the workhouse was situated in the village, the local district council was the Smallburgh Rural District Council and, indeed, members of that council met in the board room of the workhouse until its closure. The Smallburgh Rural District Council then met in special council offices in Stalham until its demise on 31 March 1974, when it was subsumed within the North Norfolk District Council under local government re-organization.

== Parish Church ==
Smallburgh's parish church is called St Peter's and dates from the 13th century, with the walls being raised in height and large windows being incorporated into the building in 1400. The 13th-century church stands on the site of an earlier Norman building. The first rector recorded is Henry Hemingburgh, in 1305, but the register of St Benet-at-Holme records the presentation of John of Smallburgh as rector in 1186. In 1677 the church tower collapsed bringing down the west wall with it and damaging the font. For many years the church was in a state of disrepair. A makeshift tower was constructed in 1822 but in 1902 the present bell cote was constructed and the west wall rebuilt. The long timescale of these repairs was because the village was very poor at that time, and the church had to use its money for the care of the poor. The church is still in use and is open for worship. It was also featured in the Doctor Who fan-film Time of Zygon.

== The Methodist Church ==
Smallburgh Methodist Church is on Norwich Road. The church was built in the 17th century but the interior is recent and of no great interest.

== Smallburgh Drainage Mill ==
A short distance east of the village across the A149 and on the banks of the River Ant can be found the remains of what was Smallburgh or Moy's drainage mill. The mill was built to drain the marshes into the river. The mill's name relates to Percy M. Moy who lived at Smallburgh Manor in the 1920s and ran Manor Farm containing land drained by the mill. The mill only had a small tower which was later heightened and in later years two pairs of patent sails, each with five bays of shutters, were fitted along with a very small cap, a gallery and an eight-bladed fan. The sails of the mill powered a scoopwheel which was set on a shaft which extended beyond the wheel to allow for an auxiliary engine drive. The mill was still working under wind power in 1935. Today all that remains is an 8 ft (2.4 m) high stump of the mill tower although it is still working but has a Lister diesel engine to power it.

== Smallburgh Tower Windmill ==
Close to both Smallburgh and nearby Wayford Bridge stands Smallburgh tower windmill. The mill was built in 1850 by millwrights England's of Ludham and stood four storeys and 30 feet (9.1 m) tall. The diameter at the base of the mill measures 14 feet (4.3 m), and the walls are 18 inches (460 mm) thick. The configuration of the mill was of four double-shuttered patent sails, each with five bays of three shutters and one bay of four shutters, struck by rack and pinion via a chain pole that drove a 14-foot-diameter (4.3 m) by 9-inch-wide (230 mm) scoop wheel and a pair of under driven 3-foot-6-inch (1.07 m) French burr stones on the first floor. The Norfolk boat-shaped cap had a petticoat at the sides and an extension to the horizontally-boarded front. The cap was turned to wind by a fan of eight blades. Today the mill no longer has its cap, although in 1984 the Broads Authority approved permission to install a new cap, fan stage and sails which still has not yet been completed. A bungalow has been attached to the mill's main body.

== The Crown Inn ==
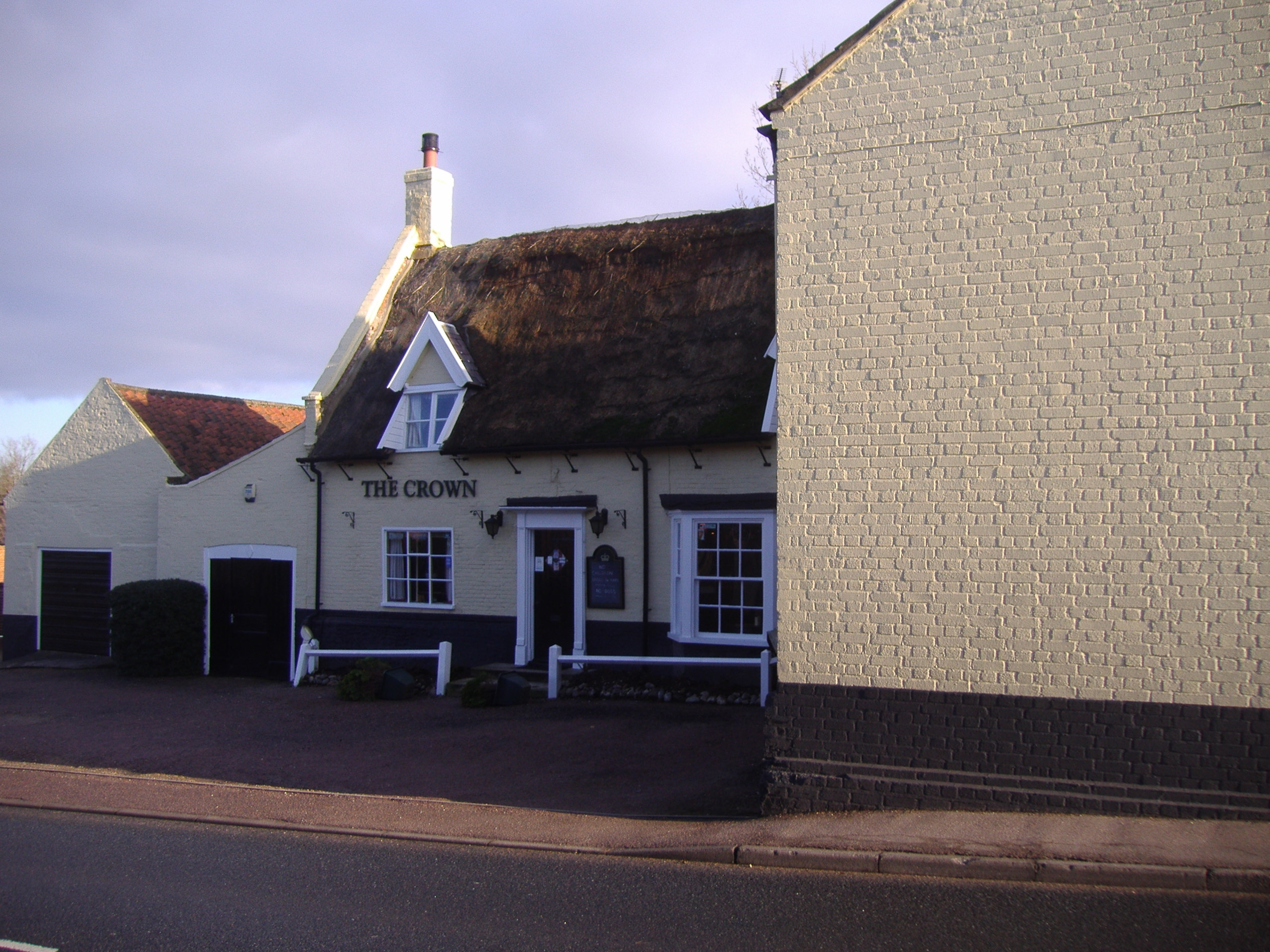
The Crown Inn, Smallburgh

The Crown Inn is situated on the eastern side of the A149 road that runs through the centre of the village. It is a 15th-century coaching inn with a great deal of history. It is of timber-framed construction and has a thatched roof hipped on the eastern side and gabled on the western end. The once-large upper room above the bar has now been divided into rooms by stud walls, but was once used for public occasions. The Crown was enlarged with an extra wing in the eighteenth century.

== Village amenities ==
- The village hall
- Playing Fields.
- Bowls Club
- Art Club
- St Peter's Church

== See also ==
- North Walsham and Dilham Canal
