= Association of Nene River Clubs =

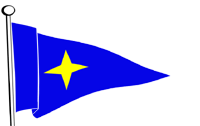
ANRC Burgee

The Association of Nene River Clubs (ANRC) is an association and umbrella organisation for waterway societies on the River Nene, England, UK. It liaises between the clubs and outside organisations, such as the Environment Agency and the Royal Yachting Association, and it is itself affiliated to the Association of Waterways Cruising Clubs. The association has its own burgee.

== Member organisations ==
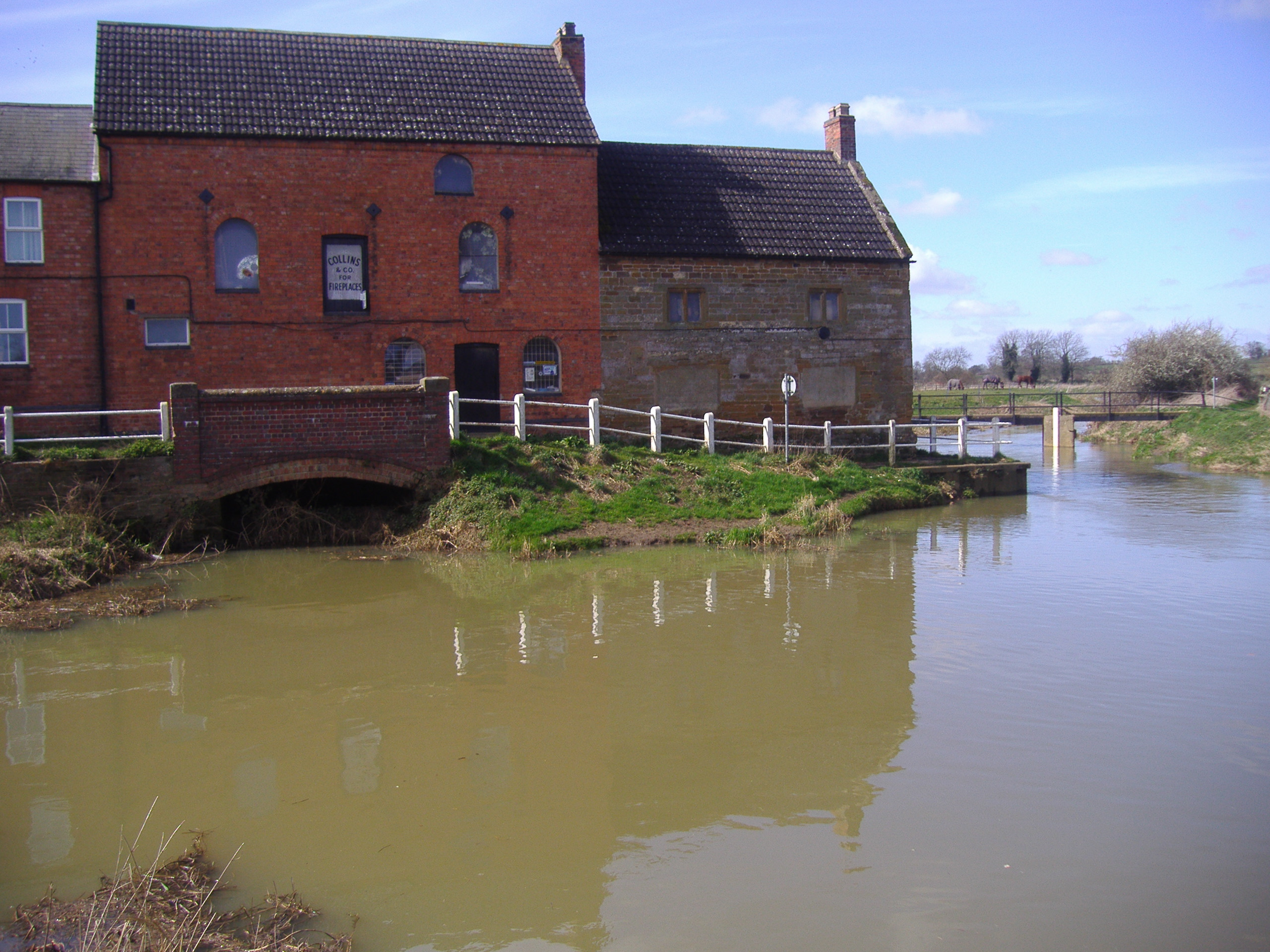
River Nene at Kislingbury Watermill

- Elton Boat Club
- Middle Level Watermen's Club
- Middle Nene Sailing Club
- Northampton Boat Club
- Oundle Cruising Club
- Peterborough Cruising Club
- Peterborough Yacht Club
- Stanground Boating Association

As of January 2015 the Committee of Middle Nene Cruising Club severed its links with the ANRC and is no longer an affiliated ANRC club, however many of its members remain as individual members.

The association is a founding member of the "Cambridgeshire Boatwatch Scheme", in cooperation with Cambridgeshire Police, the Environment Agency, and the Great Ouse Boating Association.

== See also ==
- List of waterway societies in the United Kingdom
