= Great Ouse Boating Association =

Waterway society in England

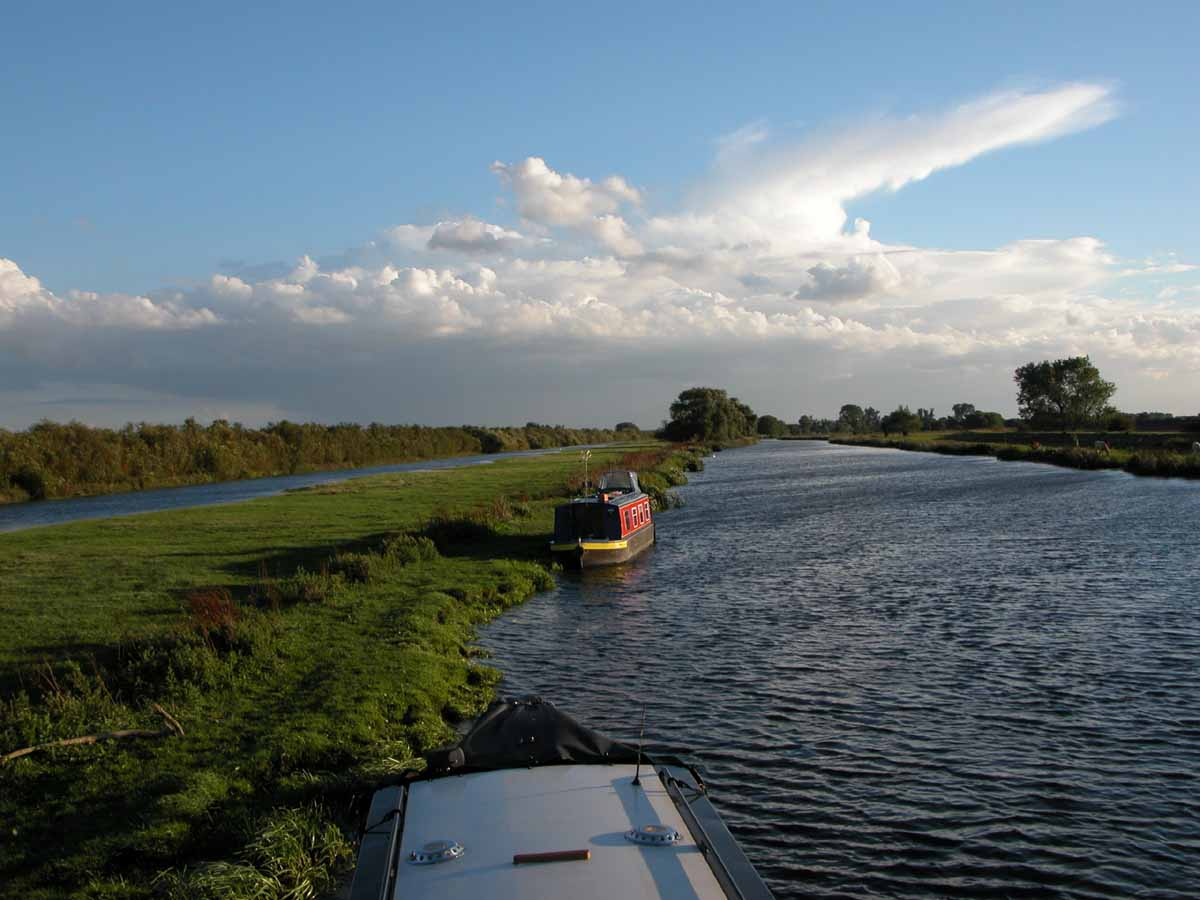
The River Great Ouse

The Great Ouse Boating Association (GOBA) is a waterway society on the rivers Great Ouse, River Cam, Lark, Little Ouse, River Wissey, and associated waterways in East Anglia.

The voluntary association was founded in 1958, and has over 3000 members. GOBA is a member of the "Cambridgeshire Boatwatch Scheme", in cooperation with Cambridgeshire Police, the Environment Agency, and the Association of Nene River Clubs.

== See also ==
- List of waterway societies in the United Kingdom
