= North Walsham and Dilham Canal =

Waterway in the English county of Norfolk

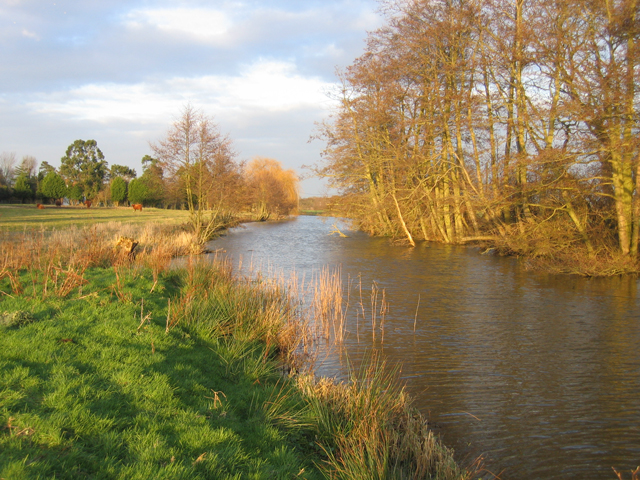
- The canal looking northwards towards Tonnage Bridge

Specifications
- Length: 8.7 km (5.4 miles)

Geography
- Start point: Swafield Bridge
- End point: Merges with the River Ant

The North Walsham and Dilham Canal is a waterway in the English county of Norfolk. It was authorised by Parliament in 1812, but work on the construction of a canal which ran parallel to a branch of the River Ant did not start until 1825. It included six locks, which were sized to accommodate wherries, and was officially opened in August 1826. It was 8.7 miles (14.0 km) long and ran from two bone mills at Antingham to a junction with the River Ant at Smallburgh. It carried offal for the bone mills and agricultural products, as it proved cheaper to land coal on the beach at Mundesley and cart it overland than to use the canal.

The venture was not a commercial success, and it was sold to various millers, who owned watermills along its length. The section above Swafield locks was abandoned in 1893, and from 1922 it was owned by the North Walsham Canal Company, set up by Edward Cubitt and George Walker, who were mill owners. The last commercial use of the canal was in 1934, and it avoided nationalisation in 1948. With the dawning of the leisure age, the canal was seen as an easy one to restore, but work to do so did not start until 2000, when the East Anglian Waterways Association (EAWA) started to run working parties for volunteers. In 2008 the North Walsham and Dilham Canal Trust was formed, and jointly run working parties with the EAWA. In 2009, part of the canal was sold to the Old Canal Company, who have worked to restore two locks and the pounds in between, in order to run Bacton Wood Mill as a watermill. Rewatering was interrupted by the Environment Agency issuing a stop notice in April 2012, but negotiations continue.

The canal served six mills, located along its banks, including the two bone mills at Antingham. There has been a mill at Bacton Wood since the time of the Domesday Book in 1086, and much of the present building dates from 1747. It was the home of Sir William Cubitt, who invented the self-regulating windmill sail and the prison treadmill. Since the millpond at Ebridge has been cleared and rewatered by volunteers, there has been a significant increase in the types of wildlife observed at the location. The area through which the canal flows is at risk of flooding, and this is mitigated by the actions of the Broads Internal Drainage Board, who manage drains and ditches in the upper regions, and have two pumping stations which pump water into the canal at its lower end.

== History ==
=== Planning and construction ===
North Walsham and Dilham Canal Navigation Act 1812
- Act of Parliament
- Parliament of the United Kingdom
- Long title: An Act for making a Navigable Canal from the Rivers Ant and Bure, at or near Wayford Bridge, near Dilham, to the Towns of North Walham and Antingham, in the County of Norfolk.
- Citation: 52 Geo. 3. c. lxix

Dates
- Royal assent: 5 May 1812

Text of statute as originally enacted

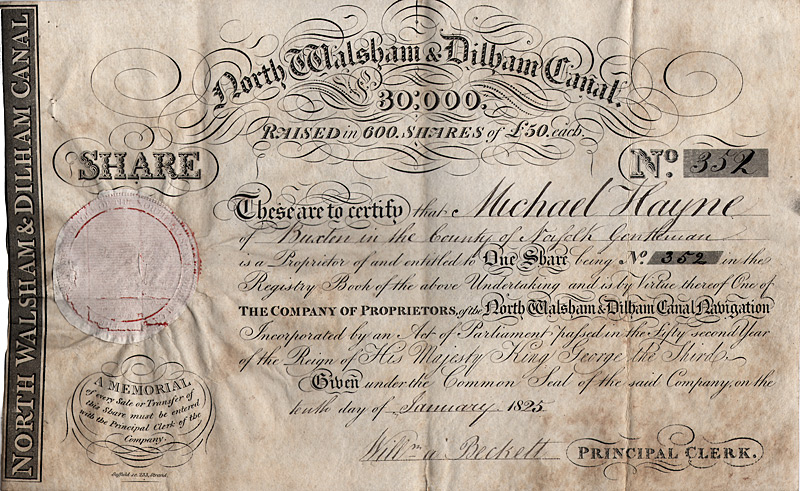
Share of the North Walsham and Dilham Canal company from 10 January 1825

Before 1810, the River Ant was navigable to the Norfolk village of Dilham. That year it was proposed that navigation could be extended north of the village. In 1811, plans were drawn up by William Youard and John Millington; one by Millington formed the basis of a bill presented to Parliament in early 1812. It was opposed by the inhabitants of Worstead and Dilham, who feared that their businesses would collapse if boats could reach the nearby town of North Walsham, but that year the North Walsham and Dilham Canal Navigation Act 1812 (52 Geo. 3. c. lxix), dated 5 May 1812, created the Company of Proprietors of the North Walsham and Dilham Canal Navigation. They had powers to raise £30,000 by the issuing of shares, and a further £10,000 if required, either from shares or by mortgage.

Work on the construction of the canal did not start until 1825, with some of the delays caused by a claim for damages made by Issac Harris Lewis, who owned his own staithe (wharf) at Dilham and felt that the new canal would damage his trade. In April 1825 he was awarded £1,500 in compensation. Work began in the same month, employing 100 men from Bedfordshire.

The canal was designed by John Millington, who acted as engineer for the project. The construction was carried out by Thomas Hughes, who had previously worked in Scotland on the Caledonian Canal, the Dingwall Canal and the Union Canal. The North Walsham and Dilham Canal was his only canal-building venture. Later in Millington's career he went to the United States, where he wrote ''Elements of Civil Engineering'' which includes much information on canal building.

Although the line of the canal ran broadly parallel to a branch of the River Ant, it did not occupy the river bed, and so was technically a canal and not a river navigation. The route required six locks to raise the level by 58 feet (18 m) along its 8.2-mile (13.2 km) length. The locks were sized for wherries, which were 50 by 12.3 feet (15.2 by 3.7 m).

=== Operation ===
Vessels were able to reach Cubitt's Mill by 14 June 1826 and the canal was formally opened on 29 August 1826. The water supply for the canal came from the ponds at Antingham, but the link into the ponds could only be used by small lighters. It was not deep enough for wherries, which had to use a basin next to Antingham Mills. Tolls on all cargoes using the canal were collected at Tonnage Bridge, where there was once a wharf and a cottage.

The main use of the canal was to carry offal to the two Antingham Bone Mills, although other cargoes were carried such as manure, flour, grain, coal and farm produce. A profitable trade in coal did not develop, as the tolls were too high and it was cheaper for coal to be brought down the coast from the north east and landed on the beach near Bacton or Mundesley, from where it would reach North Walsham by cart. Later, the railways handled most of the coal traffic. Most of the vessels using the canal were wherries, which had a draught of 3 feet (0.91 m) and were capable of carrying between 18 and 20 tons. Some wherries were of a slip-keel design, where the keel of a loaded boat could be unbolted from the bottom of the vessel while it was afloat, in order to negotiate the shallow waters of the canal. Once unloaded, the keel would be replaced, to allow more sail to be used. While detached, the keels were towed behind the boat, to prevent them from drying out and warping. A smaller 12-ton wherry regularly carried vegetables between Antingham and Great Yarmouth and was known as the cabbage wherry.

=== Decline ===
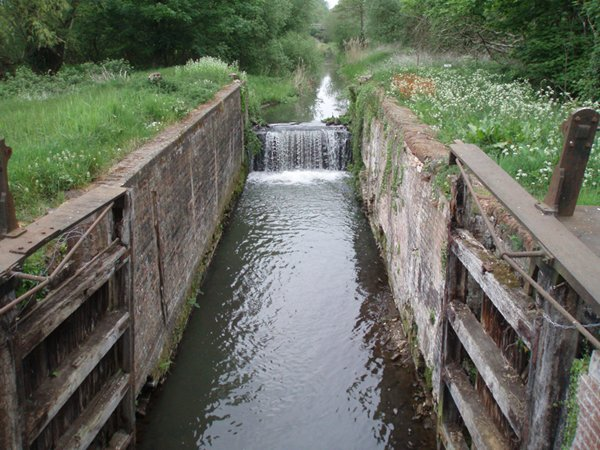
The disused canal at Briggate

North Walsham and Dilham Canal Act 1866
- Act of Parliament
- Parliament of the United Kingdom
- Long title: An Act to amend certain of the Provisions of the North Walsham and Dilham Canal Act.
- Citation: 29 & 30 Vict. c. cxxi

Dates
- Royal assent: 28 June 1866

Other legislation
- Amends: North Walsham and Dilham Canal Navigation Act 1812

The canal was not a financial success, and in 1866 the company obtained an act of Parliament, the North Walsham and Dilham Canal Act 1866 (29 & 30 Vict. c. cxxi) that would allow them to sell the canal providing three-quarters of the shareholders agreed. In 1885, they decided to use this power, as Edward Press, the owner of Bacton Wood mill, and a trader with a fleet of wherries, wished to purchase it. The sale was completed on 16 March 1886, on the understanding that the £600 price would be distributed to the shareholders. Holders of 446 of the original 586 shares were traced, but after paying money on 55 shares, James Turner, the London solicitor handling the sale, absconded with the rest of the fund. The proprietors felt morally bound to refund the money themselves, but did not do so immediately, as none of the shareholders made a claim. Eventually in 1896, five of them, including Press who had bought the canal, contributed £110 17s 7d (£110.88) to a fund which was distributed as a dividend to those who had not been paid.

In 1887, Walter Rye was appointed as the clerk and noticed a number of irregularities in the way the company ran. Edward Press was the general manager, although he was disqualified from the post as he profited from the canal, and there was no treasurer, despite the fact that the North Walsham and Dilham Canal Navigation Act 1812 required one to be appointed. There was also no way to wind up the company. Rye's concerns were ignored, as nothing changed, and Press continued to run the canal. In 1893, the upper 1.4 miles (2.3 km) from Swafield lock to Antingham were abandoned, but traffic figures for 1898 show that 6,386 tons arrived at wharves on the canal, 5,000 tons were loaded for shipping, and 400 tons were carried within the confines of the canal. Trade declined steadily but Press was an early advocate of canal tourism. He published an advert in the 1888 volume, Handbook of the Rivers and Broads of Norfolk and Suffolk, which described the various wherries which could be hired. The boats came with two crew members, and contained a ladies cabin and a gentlemen's cabin, which could also be used as a day saloon. Press died on 2 July 1906, and a director of the General Estates Company called Mr Percy bought the canal at an auction held on 11 September 1907, for £2,550.

Heavy flooding in August 1912 washed away several staithes, and resulted in a breach of the canal bank above Bacton Wood Lock. The canal was bought by the mill owners Edward Cubitt and George Walker in 1921, who expected that a new drainage board was to be created, which would take over the running of the canal. This did not occur, however, and so the two millers set up the North Walsham Canal Co Ltd, which bought the canal in January 1922 for the £1,500 they had paid. Cubitt and Walker dredged the canal from Wayford Bridge up to Bacton Wood in 1927, but at the same time dewatered the upper section above Swafield Lock. Decline continued and the wherry "Ella" made the final trading journey on the canal from Bacton Staithe in 1934. Because the canal was moribund, it was not nationalized in 1948 when most other British canals were, and continued to belong to the North Walsham Canal Company. The company sold around 1,200 yards (1,100 m) of the dry canal bed above Swafield Locks in 1948, and it reverted to farmland. In order to protect the water supply to Ebridge mill, which was still water powered, the Ebridge to Bacton Wood section was dredged in 1957. Three years later, a culvert near Royston bridge became blocked. Rather than repair it, the culvert was demolished, and the water from the canal was diverted, to rejoin the waterway below Bacton Wood lock.

== Restoration ==
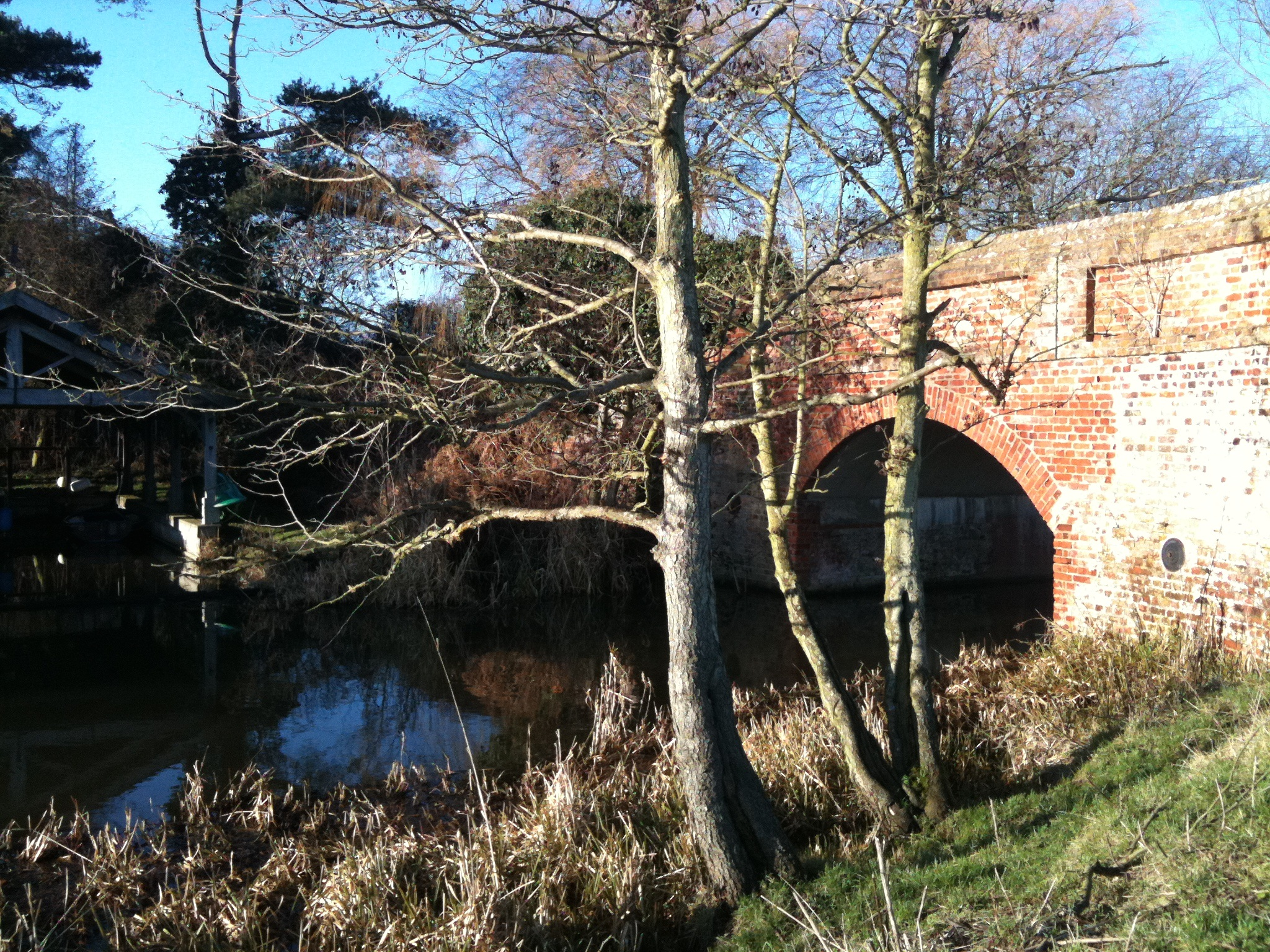
Tonnage Bridge

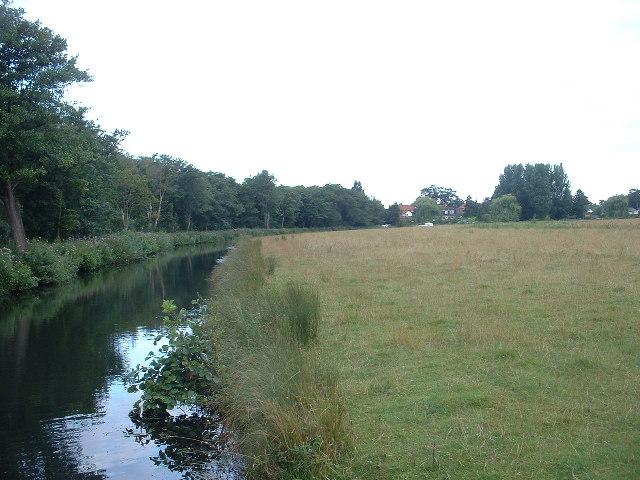
Tyler's Cut at Dilham

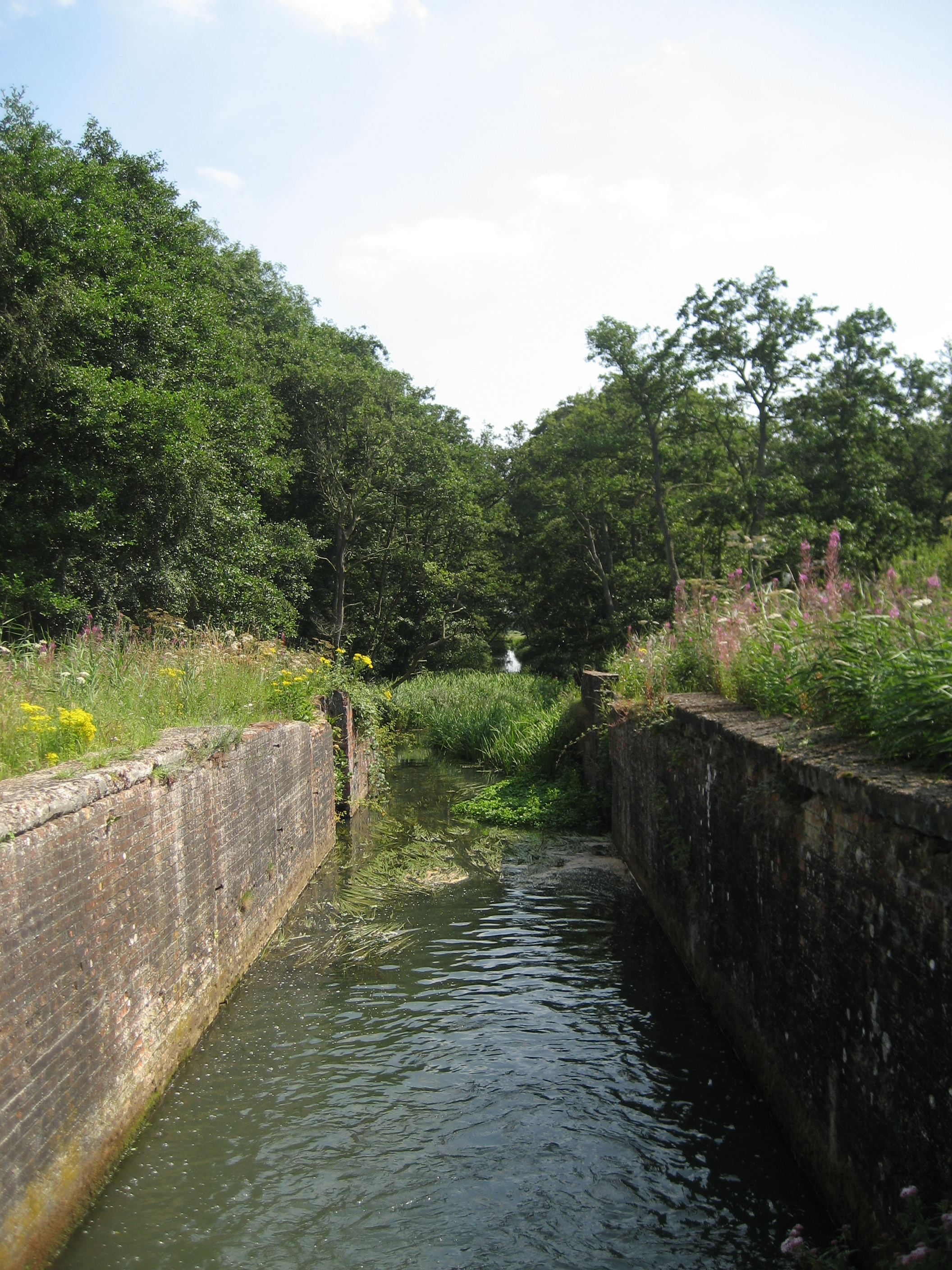
The lock at Honing

Robert Aickman and Teddy Edwards from the newly formed Inland Waterways Association visited the canal in 1953. In 1972, David Hutchings, who led the restoration of the Stratford Canal, stated that the North Walsham and Dilham should be one of the easiest to restore, since none of the locks had been demolished, and none of the bridges had been lowered. However, no immediate action was taken, and the channel gradually silted up. Tonnage Bridge collapsed in 1980, and a local landowner wanted to rebuild it. The newly formed Broads Authority was supportive, and in order to allow the work to proceed, the landowner bought the 2.25 miles (3.6 km) of canal below Honing Lock in October 1981. The purchase price was £2,050, and the bridge was rebuilt in traditional style, partly funded by a grant from the Broads Authority.

In 1993, the East Anglian Waterways Association (EAWA) decided to step up its efforts to get the waterway restored, and an engineering study of the locks and channel restoration was carried out, which found the concept to be feasible. They then commissioned and paid for a full environmental study, and North Norfolk District Council voiced their support in October 1999, although they did not envisage powered boats using the waterway. The EAWA organised working parties for volunteers from December 2000, and worked on clearing vegetation and repairs at Briggate, Bacton Wood and Honing. In 2008 the North Walsham and Dilham Canal Trust was formed. The aims of the Trust are to "protect, conserve and improve the route of the canal and its branches for the benefit of the community and the environment." It does this by working with the owners of the canal, local land owners, the East Anglian Waterways Association, local authorities and other interested parties. Since its formation, working parties have been joint ventures between the Trust and the EAWA.

Some 2.25 miles (3.62 km) of the route, consisting of the pound above Bacton Wood lock, the lock itself, the pound below it and Ebridge Lock, were sold to the Old Canal Company in 2009, following lengthy negotiations lasting some nine years. The aim of the owner, Laurence Ashton, was to rewater the section, which would in turn allow him to run Bacton Wood mill as a water mill. Having carried out extensive repair work at Ebridge Lock, a stop notice was issued by the Environment Agency in April 2012, and in November a public enquiry upheld the position. Ashton and his Old Canal Company have since restored Bacton Wood lock, with help from volunteers, and the top gates have been fitted, complete with metal balance beams salvaged from the old gates, and refurbished paddle gear. Bacton Mill quay has also been restored. At Royston Bridge, another quay has been restored. This bridge is the only one that has been lowered, and the canal has been culverted. This was done when heavy vehicles needed to reach Bacton Gas Terminal, but the gas is now piped and works traffic is reduced, so reinstatement of the bridge is possible. There is water in the channel up to the first of the Swafield locks, and Michael Starling, who owns this section, is also carrying out restoration work with a view to boats reaching Swafield.

The canal is only navigable by powered boats for the first 2 miles (3.2 km) from the Smallburgh end, up to Honing lock. However, the dredger Weasel, which was formerly owned by British Waterways, was bought by the Old Canal Company in 2010 and has dredged large sections of their canal.

The residents of North Walsham made ten mosaics for the Millennium celebrations, one of which shows a Norfolk wherry.

Most canal restoration schemes work by restoring the canal to navigation stage by stage, repairing the locks and bridges as they go. In 2023 however, the North Walsham and Dilham Canal Trust produced a new light craft vision to outline their proposals for further restoration. This involves returning the entire canal to unpowered craft status, with facilities to allow porterage where locks or other obstacles have yet to be restored. North Norfolk Council were sufficiently impressed by the vision that they agreed to fund three-quarters of the cost, and made a grant of £43,500, with the rest of the cost provided by the Trust. They obtained pontoons to help with weed clearance and to provide platforms for porterage in late 2023, and are initially concentrating on the section from the start of the navigation to Honing Lock, together with the section from Ebridge Lock to Bacton Wood Mill.

== Watermills ==
The canal served six watermills during its working life. At its northern end were two bone mills at Antingham. Antingham Upper Mill was situated at the southern end of Antingham Ponds, and was a small mill attached to a cottage. There was a small channel connecting it to the Lower Mill, and several boats were used to carry goods between the mills.

The Lower Mill was built in 1834 by Edward Harbord, 3rd Baron Suffield, whose estate adjoined the new canal and who had had a staithe built on the canal in 1829. It is probable that Harbord was a shareholder in the canal project, as he had made extension of the canal to Antingham a condition of his support to encourage economic development in the area. Bones for grinding into fertiliser were delivered by wherry to a staithe which was 150 feet (46 m) long and 80 feet (24 m) wide. The staithe was midway between the two mills. After the coming of the railways, bones were also delivered to North Walsham railway station. The ground product was sold to Fisons for use in fertilisers. Although the canal was not used after 1893, the mill continued in use until the 1920s, and the buildings were demolished after the Second World War. The Lower Mill was much larger, and was built after the canal opened. It had two storeys and was 65 yards (59 m) long. The channel between the two mills was filled in around 1905, and the mill was not powered by water after that time. It was then powered by a Crossley gas engine, which used anthracite and coke, some of which was made from coal on the site. Milling ceased in 1935 or 1936, and the mill was demolished in 1958.

Swafield Mill was a three-storey building, with a brick base, weatherboarding on the middle storey, and the upper storey built into the pantiled roof. Water was taken from the River Ant, and was used to drive two sets of stones and two flour mills in 1831. By 1967, only the brick base remained, as the mill pond had been filled in. However, the mill house, which was constructed in the mid-eighteenth century, remains and is grade II listed. It is built of brick with three storeys and three bays, with a roof of black glazed pantiles.

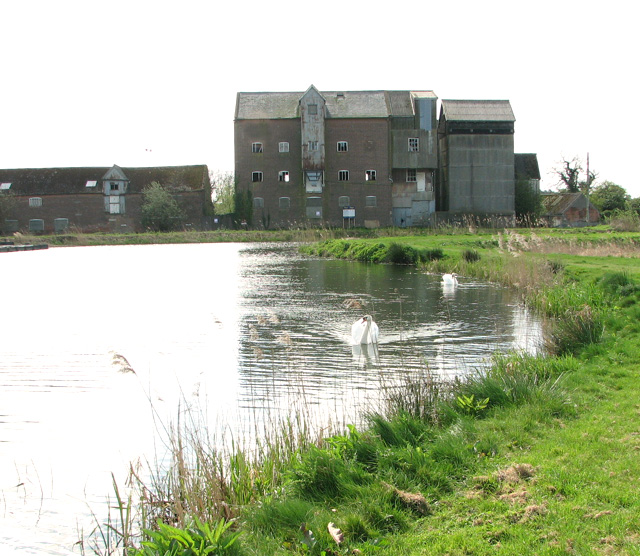
Ebridge mill in 2014, before its conversion into housing, with the restored mill pond in the foreground

There has been a mill at Bacton Wood since the Domesday Book was produced in 1086. The present building was reconstructed in 1747, and extensively modified in 1825, in anticipation of the canal opening, and the increase in trade that that might bring. It was made of white rendered brick, with a roof of slates, although the adjoining mill house had a pantiled roof, but was subsequently reroofed in slate. The cast iron waterwheel was 18 feet (5.5 m) in diameter and 8 feet (2.4 m) wide, providing enough power to turn three sets of stones. The water supply was not always adequate in the summer, and a Dodman steam plant was installed in the late nineteenth century. Its boiler exploded around 1910, and an 18 hp (13 kW) hot bulb engine manufactured by Richard Hornsby & Sons replaced it. The mill was last used commercially in 1944, by which time it was powered by a diesel engine. It was sold for conversion to a house in 1967. The Hornsby engine was sold to enthusiasts when the mill was restored in 1984, and the mill was bought by Laurence Ashton in 1994, who is hoping to run it using water power once his Old Canal Company has rewatered the canal. There are four sets of stones on the milling floor. Sir William Cubitt, who invented the self-regulating windmill sail in 1807 and the prison treadmill in 1818, lived in the mill house during his childhood.

The earliest records of a mill at Ebridge date to 1537, when it was let by the Bishop of Norwich to William Hogan. The present mill was built of red brick with a slate roof, and has five storeys. It was bought by Cubitt and Walker in 1869, and was run by Cubitt and Walker Ltd until 1998. It was powered by an oil engine and by water in 1937. Most of the original machinery was dismantled in 1966, when a new provender mill was built alongside the brick building, and it was powered by electricity in 1968. The waterwheel was removed in 1972. The mill was sold to W L Duffield and Son in 1998, who moved the business to Saxlingham Thorpe, and closed Ebridge Mill. After years of negotiation, work began on converting the mill into homes in January 2015. The end of the mill building, which was covered with asbestos sheets, and the grain store, which was added to the end of the mill in the 1950s, were demolished. The granary building is being converted into three homes, and the mill building into another three, which will retain many of the original features. The restoration includes refurbishment of the mill race.

Briggate Mill is sometimes known as Worstead Mill. It had a brick base, with two timber-framed weatherboarded storeys above, but was re-clad in corrugated iron when the weatherboarding deteriorated. The waterwheel was 14 feet (4.3 m) in diameter and 6 feet (1.8 m) wide, and was configured as a breastshot wheel. A steam roller mill was added in 1890, and the mill was subsequently converted to use electric power. The waterwheel had been removed by 1955, and the mill ceased to be used commercially in 1969, when Cubitt and Walker moved the business to Ebridge Mill. After being sold, the buildings were destroyed by fire on 7 August 1975, in what proved to be an attempt to defraud an insurance company. After a trial lasting 83 days, four men were sent to jail for the crime. Ownership of the mill pond, which lies on the opposite side of the road to the mill site and dried up in the 1970s, is uncertain. The residents of Briggate tried to get the land around the mill registered as a village green, but a public enquiry in 2010 ruled against this. Residents assisted the EAWA and Trust working parties to clear part of the mill pond, which was rewatered in 2011. It is expected to become a haven for wildlife.

== Water management ==
The canal is defined as a main river, which gives the Environment Agency powers to carry out flood defence works on it. The corridor through which the canal runs is susceptible to flooding, and there is a network of drains to mitigate this risk, which have been maintained by the Broads Internal Drainage Board (IDB) since 2006. Prior to that, they were managed by the Smallburgh Internal Drainage Board, constituted under the Land Drainage Act 1930. Five IDBs, including the Smallburgh IDB, merged to form the Broads IDB in 2005, and the following year merged with two boards responsible for the lower Yare.

Flood risk in the upper end of the canal corridor is managed by drains feeding into the canal by gravity. In the lower reaches, around Tonnage Bridge and Wayford Bridge, there is no gradient for the water to flow into the canal, and so water is pumped from the drains by pumping stations. The Broads IDB maintain two pumping stations on the lower canal. Tonnage Bridge East Ruston Pump is located on the east bank of the canal, just below Tonnage Bridge, while Wayford Bridge Pump is on the south bank of Tylers Cut, just to the west of the junction with the main canal.

== Route ==
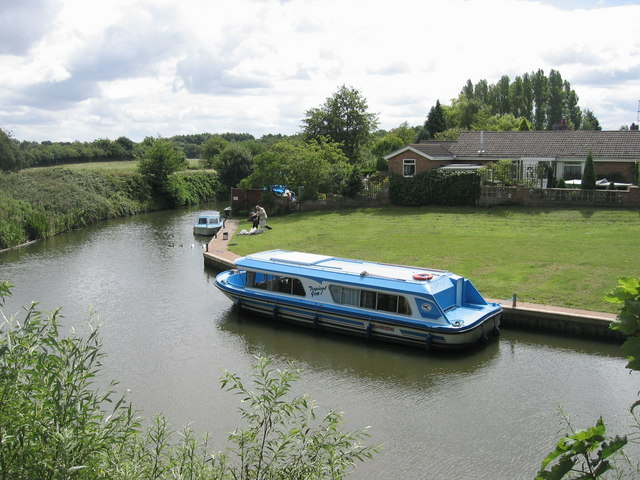
Boats moored at Dilham Staithe, at the end of Tylers Cut

At its southern end, the canal starts at Wayford Bridge, which carries the A149 road. It heads north-westwards, and soon reaches the junction with Dilham Dyke, which heads west. On the southern bank is the tower of Dilham Dyke drainage mill and the modern pumping station. Private dykes continue to the west, and Tylers Cut turns to the north west to reach moorings at Dilham Staithe and the Broadlands Arts Centre. Public navigation stops at Brickworks Bridge, but there is a short private dyke beyond. Returning to the junction, the canal heads north to reach Tonnage Bridge. There has been no towpath thus far, but a public footpath follows the left bank as the canal sweeps round to the west, passing the former branch to East Ruston, and then turns north west to reach the derelict Honing Lock.

From the head of the lock, a footpath leads to the Weavers' Way, a long-distance footpath which follows the course of the Midland and Great Northern Joint Railway at this point. Near the Grade II listed railway bridge, constructed in 1881 of steel and brick, a footpath has been constructed around Honing Staithe, which has been cleared and rewatered. The path was formally opened by Norman Lamb, Member of Parliament (MP) for North Norfolk on 28 September 2008. Continuing to the west and then the north west, the canal reaches Briggate Lock, which can be viewed from Briggate Bridge. The mill is to the south of the bridge, while the mill pond and lock are to the north. A little further north, the railway crossed the canal. The brick piers are still there, but the bridge has been replaced by a wooden footbridge, which carries the Weavers Way.

The canal continues broadly northwards to reach Ebridge lock and mill, passing the former dyke to the hamlet of Meeting House Hill on its western bank. Although there was no public access to this stretch in 2014, there are plans for a footpath between the two locks to be created. Above Ebridge lock, the mill pond has been dredged and the banks cleared, to create a large expanse of open water. Wildlife has benefitted, with sightings of water voles, Eurasian otters, reed warblers, dragonflies, kingfishers, wood sandpipers and a marsh harrier being recorded. A canalside footpath provides access to the water.

Continuing to the north west, the canal reaches Spa Common, to the east of North Walsham, where a narrow, humpbacked, grade II listed bridge carries Anchor Road over the waterway. The mill lies to the north of the bridge, awaiting a water supply. There is a footpath along the left bank of the channel most of the way to Royston Bridge, the only bridge to be culverted. To the north of the bridge is the Mike Thurston Water Activities Centre, where young people camp and learn water skills. There is a footpath along the route of the canal from the culvert to Pigneys Wood. The canal was then crossed by the railway from North Walsham Town to Sheringham. The piers remain, and a bowstring bridge carries pipes across the gap, but the footpath which follows the trackbed descends to the level of the canal and crosses it on a wooden footbridge. The route continues westwards, past the two Swafield locks, the lower one of which is still watered, and is crossed by another grade II listed bridge at Bradfield, before reaching the terminus, just below Antingham ponds.

== Locks and watermills ==
Point	Coordinates (Links to map resources)	OS Grid Ref	Notes
Antingham Ponds	52.8424°N 1.3605°E	TG264325	Original head of navigation. Antingham Bone Mills
Bradfield Bridge	52.8376°N 1.3745°E	TG273320	
Swafield Bridge	52.8366°N 1.3930°E	TG286319	7.3 miles. Swafield Mill
Royston Bridge	52.8310°N 1.4092°E	TG297313	6.5 miles
Bacton Wood lock (No 4)	52.8245°N 1.4109°E	TG299306	6.0 miles. Bacton Wood Mill
Anchor Road bridge	52.8239°N 1.4115°E	TG299306	5.9 miles
Ebridge lock (No 3)	52.8159°N 1.4282°E	TG311297	5.0 miles. Ebridge Mill
Meeting Hill Branch junction	52.8047°N 1.4233°E	TG308285	4.1 miles
Briggate lock (No 2)	52.7949°N 1.4333°E	TG315274	3.3 miles. Brigate Mill
Honing Common bridge	52.7926°N 1.4511°E	TG327272	2.6 miles
Honing lock (no 1)	52.7906°N 1.4560°E	TG331270	2.1 miles
East Ruston Branch canal	52.7885°N 1.4753°E	TG344268	1.3 miles
Tonnage Bridge, Dilham	52.7811°N 1.4794°E	TG347260	0.9 miles
Dilham Dyke junction	52.7712°N 1.4751°E	TG345249	0.4 miles
Smallburgh junction with River Ant	52.7705°N 1.4817°E	TG349248	0.0 miles

== See also ==
- Canals of the United Kingdom
- History of the British canal system

== Sources ==
- Boyes, John; Russell, Ronald (1977). The Canals of Eastern England. David and Charles. ISBN 978-0-7153-7415-3.
- Cane, Ivan (February 2010). "North Walsham and Dilham Progress". Waterways World. ISSN 0309-1422.
- Cumberlidge, Jane (2009). Inland Waterways of Great Britain (8th Ed.). Imray Laurie Norie and Wilson. ISBN 978-1-84623-010-3.
- Cumberlidge, Jane (October 2014). "Norfolk's Secret Canal". Waterways World. ISSN 0309-1422.
- Faulkner, Alan (October 2004). "The North Walsham and Dilham Canal". Waterways World. ISSN 0309-1422.
- Fisher, Stuart (2013). British River Navigations. Bloomsbury Publishing. ISBN 978-1-4729-0084-5.
- Paget-Tomlinson, Edward (2006). The Illustrated History of Canal and River Navigations. Landmark Publishing. ISBN 978-1-84306-207-3.
- Potter, Hugh (January 2012). "The North Walsham and Dilham Canal". Waterways World. ISSN 0309-1422.
- Priestley, Joseph (1831). "Historical Account of the Navigable Rivers, Canals, and Railways, of Great Britain". Archived from the original on 4 March 2016.
