= Ormesby St Margaret =

Village in Norfolk, England

Coordinates: 52.676239°N 1.688377°E

- Village
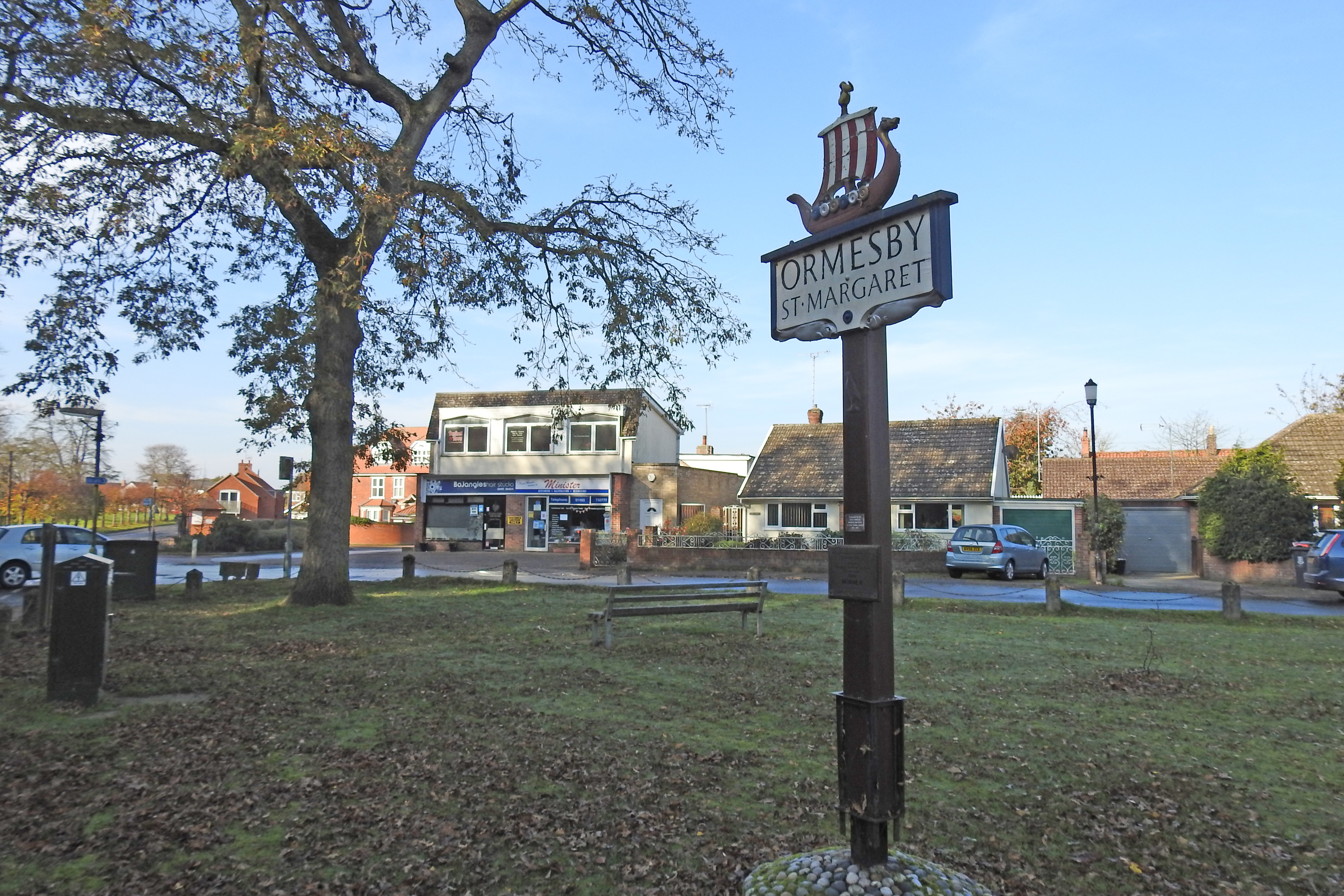
- Ormesby St Margaret village centre

- Location within Norfolk
- Area: 2,723 km^{2} (1,051 sq mi)
- Population: 2,743 (2021 Census, BUA)
  - Density: 1/km^{2} (2.6/sq mi)
- OS grid reference: TG495148
- Civil parish: Ormesby St Margaret with Scratby
- District: Great Yarmouth
- Shire county: Norfolk
- Region: East
- Country: England
- Sovereign state: United Kingdom
- Post town: GREAT YARMOUTH
- Postcode district: NR29
- Dialling code: 01493
- Police: Norfolk
- Fire: Norfolk
- Ambulance: East of England
- UK Parliament: Great Yarmouth

Ormesby St Margaret is a large village within the parish of Ormesby St Margaret with Scratby in the Borough of Great Yarmouth in Norfolk, England. The village is 7 miles (11 km) northwest of Great Yarmouth, 20 miles (32 km) northeast of Norwich and 20 miles (32 km) southeast of North Walsham. The village forms part of the wider Great Yarmouth Urban Area. The village is popular with holidaymakers due to its proximity to the coast and the Norfolk Broads. The village's built-up area had a population of 2,743 in the 2021 Census.

== History ==
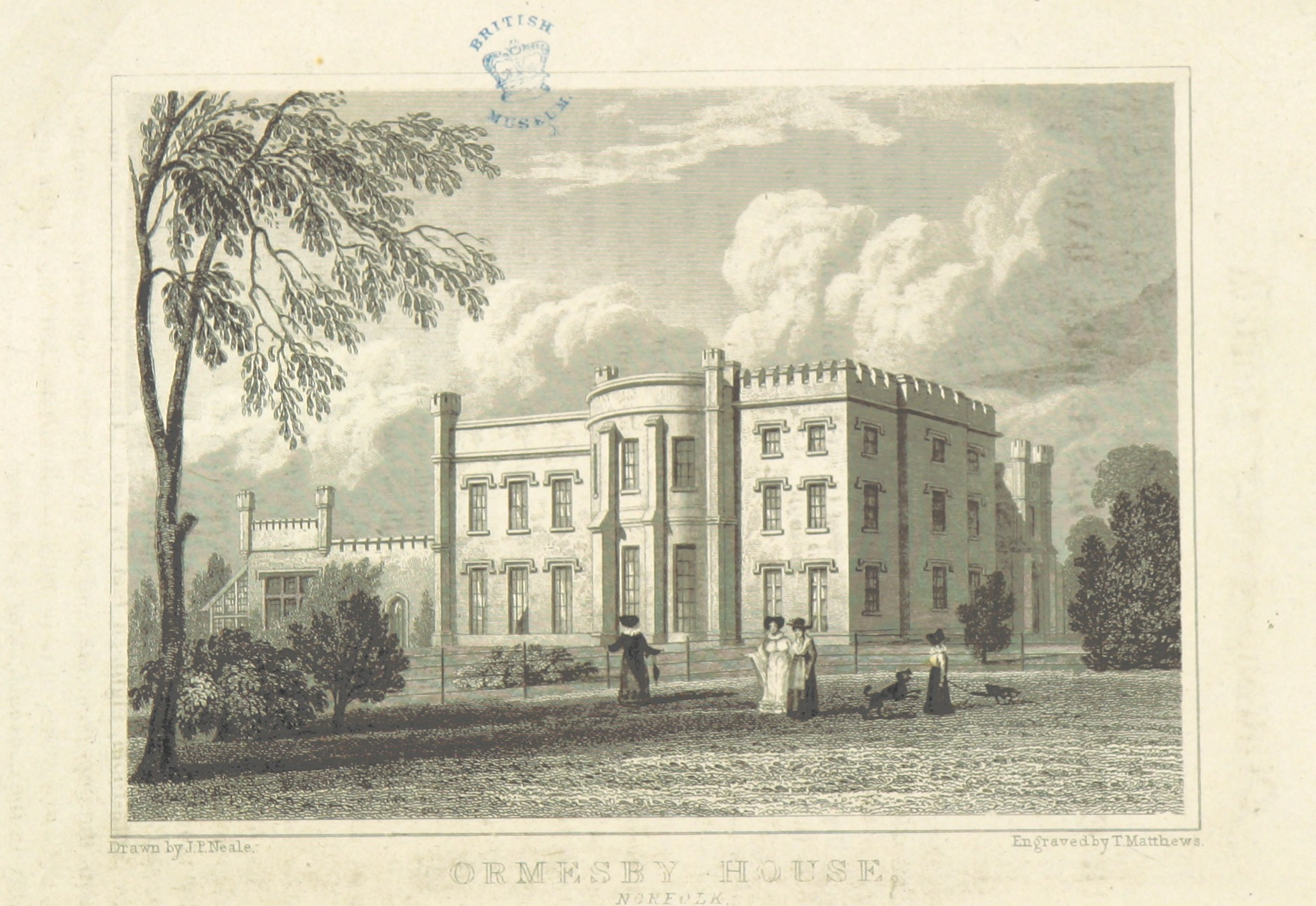
Ormesby House, 1818

The village of Ormesby St Margaret was first recorded in the Domesday Book as Ormesby. It was part of the hundred of East Flegg in the county of Norfolk. It is listed under 3 owners in the book.

The arrival of the Midland and Great Northern Joint Railway's Melton Constable – Yarmouth Beach via North Walsham Town and Stalham led to the village's growth.

== Geography ==
Ormesby St Margaret is located to the northwest of Great Yarmouth and adjacent to the villages of Caister-on-Sea, Scratby and California. The A149 road bypasses the village to the west and south, while the Caister-By-Pass/Jack Chase Way bypasses the village to the southeast, offering direct links to nearby Great Yarmouth and Gorleston-on-Sea.

== The Trinity Broads ==
The Trinity Broads are a group of five interconnected freshwater lakes close to Ormesby St Margaret and the villages of Filby and Rollesby. They form a distinct part of the Broads National Park but are unique in that they are non-tidal, not navigable by motorboats, and managed separately from the main Broads network.

== St Margaret's Church ==
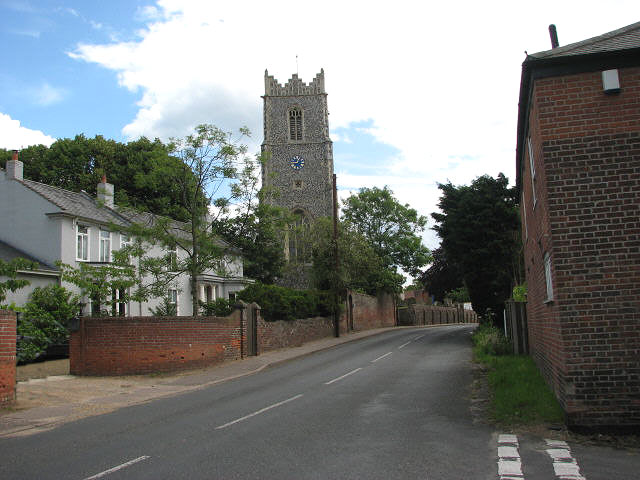
St Margaret's Church, the parish church and a Grade II* listed building in Ormesby St Margaret

Located on Yarmouth Road, the church of St Margaret was built in 14th Century and was again remodeled heavily in the 15th Century. The church has served as Ormesby St Margaret's parish church for hundreds of years. The church was later restored by Richard Phipson in the 19th century, and the church now includes features like monumental brasses to the Clere family and 20th-century stained glass windows. The church was given Grade II* listed status by Historic England on 25 September 1962.

== Amenities ==
The village centre is focused around Cromer Road, North Road and Yarmouth Road and consists of basic amenities, with larger retail centres in nearby Caister-on-Sea, Gorleston-on-Sea and Great Yarmouth.

== Ormesby Old Hall ==
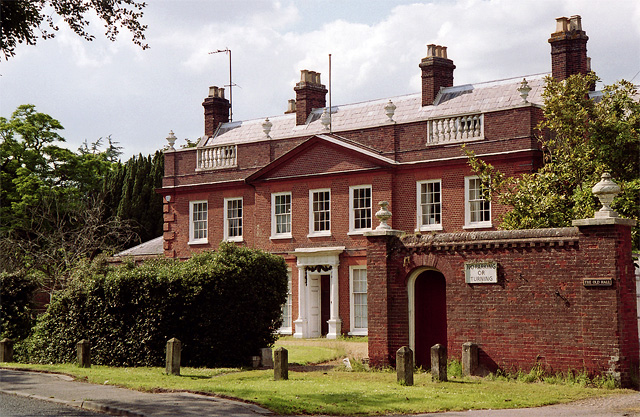
Ormesby Old Hall in 2002, it is a Grade II* listed building

Located off Yarmouth Road, is the Grade II* listed Ormesby Hall. The hall was built in the 17th Century and was owned by the Pennyman family for nearly 400 years. The present building was built for Dorothy Pennyman in the 1740s, incorporating parts of the older halls exteriors. The hall is now under private ownership and was given listed building status by Historic England on 20 February 1952, with an additional amendment made on 4 December 1987.

== Transport ==
Ormesby St Margaret is served by buses connecting the village to Great Yarmouth and North Walsham. The nearest railway stations are Great Yarmouth and Acle on the Wherry Lines. The village was historically served by four railway stations on the former Midland and Great Northern Joint Railway. With stations at Little Ormesby, Great Ormesby, Scratby and California. These have all since closed and been lost to developments except Great Ormesby, which is now a private residence.

== Education ==
The village has two schools, Ormesby Village Junior School and Ormesby Pre School. The nearest high schools are in Caister-on-Sea and Great Yarmouth, while the nearest colleges are Access Creative College, City College, East Coast College (Great Yarmouth Campus), Frisby's College, Jane Austen College, Paston College and University Technical College Norfolk. The nearest university is Norwich.

== Notable people ==
- Alice Clere (died 1538); third daughter of William Boleyn.
- John Clere (died 1557) (son of Robert and Alice Clere) Member of Parliament and naval commander.
- Sir Edmund Lacon, 2nd Baronet, Member of Parliament for Great Yarmouth.
- Zonia Bowen (1926–2024); writer, linguist and activist. Best known for finding, Merched y Wawr to promote Welsh Language and Welsh Culture.
