= List of shipwrecks in March 1870 =

The list of shipwrecks in March 1870 includes ships sunk, foundered, grounded, or otherwise lost during March 1870.

== 1 March ==
List of shipwrecks: 1 March 1870
Ship	State	Description
Elizabeth Hargrove	United Kingdom	The barque was driven ashore and wrecked south of "Coromilla Point", Chile. She was on a voyage from Porthcawl, Glamorgan to Valparaíso, Chile.
Esther	United Kingdom	The brig ran aground on the Gunfleet Sand, in the North Sea off the coast of Essex.
Gem	United Kingdom	The brig was wrecked on the Cross Sand, in the North Sea off the coast of Norfolk. Her crew were rescued by the tug Reliance (United Kingdom).
Hendrika	Flag unknown	The ship ran aground on the Backe Reef. She was on a voyage from Nantes, Loire-Inférieure, France to Lancaster, Lancashire, United Kingdom.
John	United Kingdom	The ship was wrecked on the North Gar, at the mouth of the River Tees. Her crew were rescued by the lifeboat Crosby ( Royal National Lifeboat Institution). John was on a voyage from Santander, Spain to Middlesbrough, Yorkshire.
Prince Albert	United Kingdom	The brig sank at Lowestoft, Suffolk and broke up.
S. M.	United Kingdom	The ship ran aground on a sunken wreck off Cramond Island, Lothian and was abandoned by her crew. She was on a voyage from Ballachulish, Inverness-shire to Leith, Lothian.
Times	United Kingdom	The ship was driven ashore at "Meikle Ferry". She was on a voyage from "Meikle Ferry" to Brora, Sutherland.

== 2 March ==
List of shipwrecks: 2 March 1870
Ship	State	Description
Antoinette	France	The ship was wrecked in the Pescadores Islands. Her crew were rescued. She was on a voyage from Amoy, China to Taiwanfoo, Formosa.
Catherine	United Kingdom	The sloop was driven ashore at Wicklow.
Gem	United Kingdom	The ship struck a sunken wreck off the Middle Cross Sand, in the North Sea off the coast of Norfolk. She was run onto the Cross Sand, where she was wrecked. She was on a voyage from London to Sunderland, County Durham.
Margaret	United Kingdom	The sloop was driven ashore at Wicklow.
Mary	United Kingdom	The ship struck a rock at "Pwlltowed". She was beached at "Llelnieg" in a sinking comdition. She was on a voyage from Douglas, Isle of Man to Port Dinorwic, Caernarfonshire.
Olive L. Rourke	United Kingdom	The ship was abandoned in the Atlantic Ocean. Her crew were rescued by Constantini (United States). Olive L. Rourke was on a voyage from Saint John, New Brunswick, Canada to Wexford.
Shōhei Maru	Imperial Japanese Navy	The sailing frigate was wrecked on a sandbar at (41°52′N 140°07′E) off what is now Kaminokuni, Hokkaidō, Japan, after a storm.

== 3 March ==
List of shipwrecks: 3 March 1870
Ship	State	Description
Bywater	United Kingdom	The brig was wrecked on the Haisborough Sands, in the North Sea off the coast of Norfolk. Her crew were rescued by Antias (United Kingdom). Bywater was on a voyage from West Hartlepool, County Durham to London.
Elizabeth	United Kingdom	The brig was wrecked at Bray, County Wicklow.
Jane, and Refuge	United Kingdom	The brig Jane collided with the brig Refuge and sank off the Dudgeon Sandbank, in the North Sea. One of Jane's six crew got on board Refuge's longboat. The rest of her crew took to Refuge's skiff and were reported missing. Refuge was abandoned by her crew, who took to the longboat. All on board were rescued by the smack Sir Wilfred (United Kingdom). Refuge subsequently came ashore at Hogsthorpe, Lincolnshire.
Osprey	United Kingdom	The ship was driven ashore at Dublin. She was refloated with the assistance of a steamship.
Robin Hood	United Kingdom	The schooner ran aground off Durlston Head, Dorset and sank. Her crew were rescued. She was on a voyage from Poole, Dorset to Runcorn, Cheshire.
Tongoy	United Kingdom	The barque was driven ashore 4 nautical miles (7.4 km) south of Drogheda, County Louth. Her crew were rescued. She was on a voyage from Liverpool, Lancashire to Iquique, Chile. Tongoy had become a wreck by 18 March.
Truro	New South Wales	The steamship was wrecked in Seal Rock Bay. She was on a voyage from the Manning River to Sydney.

== 4 March ==
List of shipwrecks: 4 March 1870
Ship	State	Description
Adelia Ann	United Kingdom	The schooner was wrecked at Pakefield, Suffolk. Her five crew were rescued by the Pakefield Lifeboat Sisters ( Royal National Lifeboat Institution). Adelia Ann was on a voyage from London to Goole, Yorkshire.
Balaklava	United Kingdom	The schooner struck the pier and was damaged at Lowestoft, Suffolk. She was on a voyage from Seaham, County Durham to Lowestoft.
Balcarry	United Kingdom	The barque ran aground in the Le Maire Strait. She was on a voyage from Liverpool, Lancashire to Valparaíso, Chile. She was later refloated, but was driven ashore in Policarpe Cove. She was refloated in January 1872 and taken in to Stanley, Falkland Islands.
Diadem	United Kingdom	The ship ran aground on the Middle Sand, in the North Sea off the coast of Essex.
Diane	France	The ship ran aground at Lowestoft. She was on a voyage from the Charente to Leith, Lothian, United Kingdom.
Emulous	United Kingdom	The brig was driven ashore and wrecked at Cromer, Norfolk. Her crew were rescued by the Cromer Lifeboat Benjamin Bond Cabbell ( Royal National Lifeboat Institution).
Ernest and Ada	United Kingdom	The barque was driven ashore and wrecked at Walmer Castle, Kent. She was on a voyage from London to Dover, Kent.
Euryale	French Navy	The steamship, a Génie-class brig, was wrecked on Starbuck Island. All on board survived. She was on a voyage from Tahiti to San Francisco, California, United States.
Friends	United Kingdom	The brig ran aground on Corton Sand, in the North Sea off the coast of Suffolk. She was on a voyage from Sunderland, County Durham to Galaţi, Ottoman Empire. She was refloated and taken in to Great Yarmouth, Norfolk in a severely leaky condition.
Gifyring	United Kingdom	The barque was driven ashore at Aldeburgh, Suffolk. Her crew were rescued. She was on a voyage from Southwold to Ipswich.
Hirondelle	France	The ship departed from Rangoon, Burma for Falmouth, Cornwall, United Kingdom. No further trace, presuned founedred with the loss of all hands.
Hippogriff	United Kingdom	The schooner was wrecked on the Scratby Sands, Norfolk. Her crew were rescued by the barque Ratcliffe (United Kingdom).
H. L.	Papal States	The ship was wrecked on the Cross Sand, in the North Sea off the coast of Norfolk with the loss of all hands.
Mary	United Kingdom	The schooner was driven ashore and wrecked between Scratby and California, Norfolk. Her five crew were rescued by a lifeboat. She was on a voyage from Newcastle upon Tyne, Northumberland to Antwerp, Belgium.
Olive Leaf	United Kingdom	The snack was driven ashore and wrecked at Gorleston, Sufffolk. Her crew were rescued by rocket apparatus.
Ontario	United Kingdom	The brig ran aground on the Margate Sands and sank. Her crew were rescued by the lugger Ocean (United Kingdom). Ontario was on a voyage from Galaţi, Ottoman Empire to Bremen.
Richard Cobden	United Kingdom	The barque ran aground on the North Bull, in the Irish Sea off the coast of County Louth. Ten of the thirteen crew were taken off by the Drogheda Lifeboat Old George Irlam ( Royal National Lifeboat Institution), her captain and both mates refusing to leave. She was on a voyage from Liverpool to Montevideo, Uruguay. She was later refloated and taken in to Drogheda, County Louth.
Sarah Caroline	United Kingdom	The ship was driven ashore and wrecked on Blockhouse Island. She was on a voyage from Troon, Ayrshire to Newry, County Antrim.
Savoyard	United Kingdom	The Yorkshire Billyboy was driven ashore and wrecked at Sizewell, Suffolk. She was on a voyage from Great Yarmouth to London.
Scio	United Kingdom	The schooner was driven ashore and sank at Cleethorpes, Lincolnshire. Crew presumed lost.
Sea Flower	United Kingdom	The collier, a brig, was wrecked on Baggy Leap, in Barnstaple Bay. Her crew were rescued.
Unnamed	Flag unknown	The brig ran aground on the Heaps Sand, in the North Sea off the coast of Essex and was wrecked with the loss of all hands.

== 5 March ==
List of shipwrecks: 5 March 1870
Ship	State	Description
Alexander	Denmark	The brig was driven ashore and wrecked at Dungeness, Kent, United Kingdom.
Caroline	United Kingdom	The ship was wrecked on Blockhouse Ledges. She was on a voyage from Troon, Ayrshire to Newry, County Antrim.
Eagle	United States	The steamship was driven ashore on Bodie Island, North Carolina. All on board were rescued. She was on a voyage from Baltimore, Maryland to Havana, Cuba. She had become a wreck by 23 March.
Fawn	(United Kingdom of Great Britain and Ireland) Guernsey	The sloop was driven ashore at New Romney, Kent. She was on a voyage from Rotterdam, South Holland, Netherlands to Guernsey. She was refloated on 17 March and taken in to Dover, Kent.
Frances	United Kingdom	The sailing barge was driven ashore at Bembridge, Isle of Wight.
Saucy Lass	United Kingdom	The fishing smack was run into by the smack Leapon No.9 (Belgium) and sank in the North Sea. Her six crew were rescued by Leapon No.9.
Specimen	United Kingdom	The ship was driven ashore at Bridgwater, Somerset.
Tammo	Flag unknown	The brig was abandoned and sank 21 nautical miles (39 km) north west of Lisbon, Portugal. Her crew were rescued by the barque Nathalie (France). Tammo was on a voyage from Newport, Monmouthshire, United Kingdom to a port in New Granada.

== 6 March ==
List of shipwrecks: 6 March 1870
Ship	State	Description
Bellona	United Kingdom	The steamship ran aground on the Middle Sand, in the North Sea off the coast of Essex. She was on avoyage from London to New York, United States. She was refloated with assistance and resumed her voyage.
Chester, and Thames	United Kingdom; United Kingdom	The steamship Chester collided with the steamship Thames and was beached at Great Yarmouth, Norfolk. Her fifteen crew were rescued. She was on a voyage from Sunderland, County Durham to London. Thames was on a voyage from London to Stockton-on-Tees, County Durham and was taken in to Great Yarmouth in a severely damaged condition.
Elizabeth Mary, and Jeune Xavier	United Kingdom; France	The lugger Jeune Xavier collided with the schooner Elizabeth Mary and foundered off the Runnel Stone, Cornwall, United Kingdom. Her seven crew took to a boat and landed at Land's End, Cornwall. Elizabeth Mary was on a voyage from Cardiff, Glamorgan to Penzance, Cornwall. She was abandoned by her crew, who were rescued by the schooner Elizabeth Thomas (United Kingdom). She was taken in to the Isles of Scilly.
Sarah Payson	Canada	The schooner was abandoned in the Atlantic Ocean. Her crew were rescued by Palm Tree (United Kingdom). Sarah Payson was on a voyage from South Shields, County Durham, United Kingdom to Boston, Massachusetts, United States.
Urania	United Kingdom	The steamship ran ashore on Lady Isle, in the Firth of Clyde. She was on a voyage from the Clyde to Morecambe, Lancashire. She was refloated with assistance from the tug Warrior (United Kingdom).

== 7 March ==
List of shipwrecks: 7 March 1870
Ship	State	Description
Aakanden	Denmark	The ship was driven ashore and wrecked at Dungeness, Kent, United Kingdom with the loss of all hands.
Crystal Palace	United Kingdom	The ship struck a rock off Lundy Island, Devon and was holed. She was on a voyage from Barrow-in-Furness, Lancashire to Swansea, Glamorgan. She put in to Milford Haven, Pembrokeshire in a sinking condition.
Esther	United Kingdom	The smack was driven ashore at Porth Navas, Cornwall. Her crew were rescued. She was on a voyage from Porth Navas to Chatham, Kent.
Lily of the Valley	United Kingdom	The barque was abandoned in the Atlantic Ocean. Her crew were rescued by the barque Fanny (United Kingdom). Lily of the valley was on a voyage from Constanţa, Ottoman Empire to Falmouth, Cornwall.
Ravensbury	United Kingdom	The steamship ran aground and was wrecked of the Schulpenplaat, off Brielle, South Holland, Netherlands. She was on a voyage from Harwich, Essex to Rotterdam, South Holland.

== 8 March ==
List of shipwrecks: 8 March 1870
Ship	State	Description
Auguste Marie	France	The barque foundered in the Atlantic Ocean (48°53′N 9°35′W). Her crew were rescued by the barque Nuova Ottavia (Italy). Auguste Marie was on a voyage from Pontrieux, Côtes-du-Nord to Cardiff, Glamorgan, United Kingdom.
Auguste Victorine	France	The fishing smack was run down and sunk in the English Channel off Shoreham-by-Sea, Sussex, United Kingdom by the barque Eryeina (United Kingdom) with the loss of her captain.
Oery and Jane	United Kingdom	The ship collided with Sunda (United Kingdom) and sank at Galle, Ceylon.
River Mersey	United Kingdom	The barque departed from San Francisco, California for Liverpool, Lancashire. No further trace, presumed foundered with the loss of all hands.
Volunteer	United Kingdom	The brig ran aground on the Goodwin Sands, Kent. She was on a voyage from South Shields, County Durham to Shoreham-by-Sea. She was refloated with assistance from the Broadstairs Lifeboat Samuel Morrison Collins, the Ramsgate Lifeboat Bradford (both Royal National Lifeboat Institution) and the tug Aid (United Kingdom) and taken in to Ramsgate, Kent in a leaky condition.

== 9 March ==
List of shipwrecks: 9 March 1870
Ship	State	Description
Aquiline	United Kingdom	The barque capsized and sank at Colombo, Ceylon. Her crew were rescued.
Carlo	Italy	The ship was wrecked at Buenos Aires, Argentina.
Catalina	Argentina	The schooner was driven ashore at Buenos Aires.
Cavour	Argentina	The steamship sank at Buenos Aires. Her crew survived.
Emilio	Argentina	The steamship was driven ashore at Buenos Aires.
Henry	Argentina	The pilot boat, a schooner, was driven ashore at Buenos Aires.
Highland Nancy	Canada	The brig collided with Western Star (United States) and was abandoned. Her crew were rescued. Highland Nancy was on a voyage from New York, United States to Mayagüez, Puerto Rico.
Mabel	United Kingdom	The brigantine was driven ashore at Buenos Aires.
HMRC Margaret	Board of Customs	The ship ran aground in the Bristol Channel. Subsequently refloated, repaired and returned to service.
Principessa Margherita	Regia Marina	The gunboat was driven ashore at Buenos Aires.
Triomfo	Italy	The ship was wrecked at Buenos Aires.
No. 282	Argentina	The pilot boat, a schooner, was driven ashore at Buenos Aires.
No. 314	Argentina	The pilot boat, a schooner, was driven ashore at Buenos Aires.
Two unnamed vessels	Flags unknown	The schooners were driven ashore at Buenos Aires.
Unnamed	Flag unknown	The polacca was driven ashore at Palermo, Argentina.
Unnamed	Argentina	The pilot boat was driven ashore and wrecked at Buenos Aires.
Unnamed	Argentina	The pilot boat sank at Buenos Aires.
Unnamed	Flag unknown	The brigantine was driven ashore near Palermo, Argentina.
Unnamed	Flag unknown	The brig was driven ashore near Palermo, Argentina.

== 10 March ==
List of shipwrecks: 10 March 1870
Ship	State	Description
Annie Elizabeth	United Kingdom	The ship collided with a steamship and sank in the Crosby Channel. Her crew were rescued by Christina (United Kingdom). Annie Elizabeth was on a voyage from Conway, Caernarfonshire to Liverpool, Lancashire.
Lady Beatrice, or Lady Elizabeth	United Kingdom	The ship was driven ashore in the River Thames near Gravesend, Kent.
Vaaren	Norway	The brig was driven ashore on Læsø, Denmark. She was on a voyage from Grangemouth, Stirlingshire, United Kingdom to Aarhus, Denmark. She was refloated with assistance and resumed her voyage.
Waterhuizen	Netherlands	The ship was wrecked at Laguna de los Padres, Argentina. Her crew were rescued.

== 11 March ==
List of shipwrecks: 11 March 1870
Ship	State	Description
Camelia	Malta	The schooner was wrecked at Mogador, Morocco. Her crew survived.
Grace	United Kingdom	The schooner was run into by the barque Pride of Wales (United Kingdom) and sank 7 nautical miles (13 km) off the North Foreland, Kent with the loss of a crew member.
Guess	(United Kingdom of Great Britain and Ireland) Jersey	The brig ran aground off "Cannonier's Point". She was on a voyage from Newcastle, New South Wales to Mauritius. She had floated off by 8 April and sank.
Hera	Norway	The 440-ton barque was run ashore at Port Underwood, New Zealand when she was found to be on fire, and was destroyed.
John Ferguson	United Kingdom	The ship was wrecked on the "Isle of Cloes". Her crew were rescued. She was on a voyage from Trinidad to Greenock, Renfrewshire.
Sir Edward Banks	United Kingdom	The Thames barge was run down and sunk in the River Thames at Gravesend, Kent by the steamship Berlin (United Kingdom) with the loss of all three crew.

== 12 March ==
List of shipwrecks: 12 March 1870
Ship	State	Description
Avoca	United Kingdom	The steamship ran aground on the South Bank, in Liverpool Bay.
C. C. Horton	Canada	The ship was abandoned in the Atlantic Ocean. Her crew were rescued by China (United States). C. C. Horton was on a voyage from London, United Kingdom to Boston, Massachusetts, United States.
Notre Dame des Victoires	France	The ship ran aground on the Colorados. Her crew survived. She was on a voyage from Nigul Bay, Jamaica to Falmouth, Cornwall, United Kingdom. She broke up on 16 March.
Ocean Queen	United Kingdom	The schooner was driven ashore at the Point of Ayr, Cheshire. She was on a voyage from Mostyn, Flintshire to Douglas, Isle of Man.
Sarah	United Kingdom	The ship ran aground and capsized at Moulmein, Burma. She was on a voyage from Bombay, India to Moulmein.
Therese	France	The ship was wrecked on Terschelling, Friesland, Netherlands. She was on a voyage from Saint Petersburg, Russia to Dunkirk, Nord.
Wetherall	United Kingdom	The smack foundered in the North Sea with the loss of two of her four crew.

== 13 March ==
List of shipwrecks: 13 March 1870
Ship	State	Description
Austerlitz	United States	The schooner was damaged by heavy seas in a gale, which left her in a sinking condition. Crew taken off by schooner Riverdale.
Challenge	New Zealand	The 57-ton schooner was wrecked on the bar at the mouth of the Manukau Harbour, New Zealand, when the wind dropped while she was crossing the bar.
Excelsior	United Kingdom	The steamship was wrecked on the Île d'Yeu, Vendée, France. Her crew were rescued. She was on a voyage from Saint-Nazaire, Ille-et-Vilaine to Bordeaux, Gironde, France.
Let Me Alone	United Kingdom	The brigantine was driven ashore at Saltfleet, Lincolnshire.
Linden	United Kingdom	The schooner collided with the steamship Cromwell (United Kingdom) and sank in the English Channel off Cap La Hougue, Seine-Inférieure, France with the loss of four of her crew.

== 14 March ==
List of shipwrecks: 14 March 1870
Ship	State	Description
Carnarvon Castle	United Kingdom	The ship heeled over at Wapping, Middlesex. She was righted.
Sarah King	Canada	The barque foundered in the Atlantic Ocean 200 nautical miles (370 km) off Cape Hatteras, North Carolina, United States. Her crew were rescued by the brig Armida (Sweden). Sarah King was on a voyage from Sagua La Grande, Cuba to Philadelphia, Pennsylvania, United States.

== 15 March ==
List of shipwrecks: 15 March 1870
Ship	State	Description
Active	United Kingdom	The ship was driven ashore near the Covesea Skerries Lighthouse, Moray. She was on a voyage from Sunderland, County Durham to Burghead, Moray. She was refloated with assistance and found to be leaky.
Margaret	United Kingdom	The schooner was driven ashore and wrecked at Whitburn, County Durham. She was on a voyage from Sunderland to Aberdeen.
Rusco Castle	United Kingdom	The ship struck the pier at South Shields, County Durham and was holed. She was on a voyage from London to the River Tyne.

== 16 March ==
List of shipwrecks: 16 March 1870
Ship	State	Description
Anna Catharina	Stettin	The ship ran aground at Portmadoc, Caernarfonshire. She was on a voyage from Port Madoc to Stettin.
Astrea	United Kingdom	The barque was driven ashore and wrecked at Hook Head, County Wexford. Her crew were rescued.
Benvenue	United Kingdom	The barque ran aground on the Owers Sandbank, in the English Channel off the coast of Sussex and sank. Her crew were rescued. She was on a voyage from Penang, Straits Settlements to London.
Portia	United Kingdom	The barque foundered off the Longships Lighthouse, Cornwall. Her crew survived.

== 17 March ==
List of shipwrecks: 17 March 1870
Ship	State	Description
Allahabad	United Kingdom	The East Indiaman was driven ashore near Ambelteuse, Pas-de-Calais, France. She was on a voyage from Samarang, Netherlands East Indies to Amsterdam, North Holland, Netherlands.
Furnhjelm	(Russian Empire) Grand Duchy of Finland	The ship sank 20 nautical miles (37 km) off "Vihern", Spain. Her crew were rescued. She was on a voyage from London, United Kingdom to Philadelphia, Pennsylvania, United States.
Gamester	United Kingdom	The fishing smack departed from West Hartlepool, County Durham. No further trace, presumed foundered with the loss of all five crew.
Industrie	France	The ship was run ashore in Portifer Bay, Guernsey, Channel Islands. She was on a voyage from Aquin, Haiti to Havre de Grâce, Seine-Inférieure.
Mary Matthews	United Kingdom	The brigantine was driven ashore and wrecked in Morte Bay. She was on a voyage from São Miguel Island, Azores to Swansea, Glamorgan.
Normandy	United Kingdom	The paddle steamer sank with the loss of 30 lives in the English Channel 20 miles from The Needles, Isle of Wight after colliding with the screw steamship Mary (United Kingdom). Mary rescued 50 survivors. Normandy was on a voyage from Southampton, Hampshire to Jersey, Channel Islands

== 18 March ==
List of shipwrecks: 18 March 1870
Ship	State	Description
St. George	United Kingdom	The ship sank off Perros, Côtes-du-Nord, France. She was on a voyage from Lannion, Côtes-du-Nord to Jersey, Channel Islands.
Tweedsdale	United Kingdom	The ship grounded at low water in harbour at Greenock, Renfrewshire and sprang a leak.
Ventus	Belgium	The ship was driven ashore at Borsele, Zeeland, Netherlands. She was on a voyage from Callao, Peru to Antwerp.

== 19 March ==
List of shipwrecks: 19 March 1870
Ship	State	Description
Michael Hutchington	United Kingdom	The barque collided with the tug Enterprise and sank at Liverpool, Lancashire. She was on a voyage from San Francisco, California, United States to Liverpool. Michael Hutchinson was refloated and taken in to dock, where she sank again.
Pioneer	United Kingdom	The paddle tug was crushed between the full-rigged ship Southern Empire and the quayside at Birkenhead, Cheshire and sank. She was refloated the next day.
Zedok	United Kingdom	The barque struck the quayside at Birkenhead and was severely damaged. She was on a voyage from San Francisco to Birkenhead.

== 20 March ==
List of shipwrecks: 20 March 1870
Ship	State	Description
Ann	United Kingdom	The schooner foundered off Padstow, Cornwall. Her crew were rescued. She was on a voyage from Newport, Monmouthshire to Penzance, Cornwall.
Asenath	United Kingdom	The brig ran aground and was severely damaged. She was on a voyage from the Rio de la Hacha to Carrizal. She was refloated and taken in to the Rio Hacha, where she was declared a constructive total loss.
Emily	United Kingdom	The steamship caught fire and was beached at Harwich, Essex. She was on a voyage from Goole, Yorkshire to London.
Symmetry	United Kingdom	The ship foundered 5 nautical miles (9.3 km) south of the Blasquets. Her crew were rescued. She was on a voyage from Cardiff, Glamorgan to Galway.
William Watson	United Kingdom	The brig was wrecked in Åland, Grand Duchy of Finland. Her crew were rescued. She was on a voyage from Swinemünde, Prussia to Gävle, Sweden.

== 21 March ==
List of shipwrecks: 21 March 1870
Ship	State	Description
Amalie Gehring	United States	The ship was wrecked on the Lobos Keys. Her crew were rescued. She was on a voyage from Antwerp, Belgium to New Orleans, Louisiana.
Aquila	United Kingdom	The ship collided with another vessel and sank. She was on a voyage from Marseille, Bouches-du-Rhône, France to Gloucester.
Jane Anderson	United Kingdom	The ship departed from Middlesbrough, Yorkshire for Swinemünde, Prussia. No further trace, presumed foundered with the loss of all nine crew.
Lady Ernestine	United Kingdom	The ship struck rocks at Morte Point, Devon. She was refloated and taken in to Ilfracombe, Devon in a sinking condition. She was repaired and resumed her voyage.
Michael Hutchinson	United Kingdom	The ship ran aground on the Pluckington Bank, in Liverpool Bay. She was on a voyage from San Francisco, California, United States to Liverpool, Lancashire. She was refloated the next day and taken in to Liverpool, where she sank.
Pioneer	United Kingdom	The tug was damaged at Birkenhead, Cheshire when she became trapped between Southern Empire (United Kingdom) and the quayside.
Sack	United Kingdom	The schooner departed from Burntisland, Fife for Copenhagen, Denmark. No further trace, presumed foundered with the loss of all hands.
Venezuela	United Kingdom	The steamship suffered a failure of her stern post in the Atlantic Ocean (33°30′N 43°30′W), losing her rudder and becoming flooded at the stern. Her fifteen passengers were taken off by the steamship Camilla (United Kingdom); her 42 crew refusing to abandon ship. Venezuela was on a voyage from London to Colón, United States of Colombia.
Zadoc	United Kingdom	The ship collided with the quayside at Birkenhead and was severely damaged.

== 22 March ==
List of shipwrecks: 22 March 1870
Ship	State	Description
Chariot of Fame	United Kingdom	The ship was sighted in the Indian Ocean whilst on a voyage from Rangoon, Burma to a British port. No further trace, presumed foundered with the loss of all hands.
Fenham	United Kingdom	The steamship was driven ashore in the Sea of Marmara at "Kora", Ottoman Empire. She was on a voyage from Odesa, Russia to Alexandria, Egypt. She had been refloated by 28 March and taken in to Gallipoli, Ottoman Empire.
Helios	United Kingdom	The ship was driven ashore at Pensacola, Florida, United States. She was on a voyage from an English port to Rangoon. She was refloated and taken in to Pensacola for repairs.
Rangoon	New South Wales	The barque was wrecked near the mouth of the Minnamurra River. Her crew were rescued. She was on a voyage from Newcastle to Melbourne, Victoria.
Scotia	United Kingdom	The schooner ran aground on the Haisborough Sands, in the North Sea off the coast of Norfolk. She was on a voyage from London to Aberdeen. She was refloated and towed in to Great Yarmouth, Norfolk in a leaky condition.
Waterwitch	United Kingdom	The ship ran aground on the Maplin Sands, in the North Sea off the coast of Essex.

== 23 March ==
List of shipwrecks: 23 March 1870
Ship	State	Description
Arabian	United Kingdom	The barque foundered in the Dogger Bank with the loss of a crew member. She was on a voyage from Middlesbrough, Yorkshire to Swinemünde, Prussia.
Falcon	New Zealand	The 42-ton schooner was run aground and was wrecked at Opunake, New Zealand.
George	United Kingdom	The ship was abandoned in the North Sea in a sinking condition. She was on a voyage from Middlesbrough to Swinemünde.
Germania	Bremen	The brigantine was wrecked on the Goodwin Sands, Kent, United Kingdom. Her seven crew were rescued by the North Deal Lifeboat Van Kook ( Royal National Lifeboat Institution). Germania was on a voyage from Saint Domingo to Hamburg.
Lavinia	United Kingdom	The barque was driven ashore at Ballywalter, County Antrim. She was on a voyage from Greenock, Renfrewshire to the Newfoundland Colony. She was refloated and taken in tow for Greenock.
Margaret	United Kingdom	The schooner was driven ashore and wrecked at Spital Point, Northumberland. Her crew were rescued by the Berwick upon Tweed Lifeboat Albert Victor ( Royal National Lifeboat Institution).
Mieva Idea	Peru	The schooner sank at Cerro Azul with the loss of all hands.
North Star	United Kingdom	The barque was wrecked on the Consher Reef.
Vivid	United Kingdom	The ship ran aground on the Corton Sand, in the North Sea off the coast of Suffolk. She was refloated and taken in to Great Yarmouth, Norfolk in a leaky condition.
Unnamed	Flag unknown	The schooner was wrecked on the Goodwin Sands. Her crew were rescued by the North Deal Lifeboat Van Kook ( Royal National Lifeboat Institution).

== 24 March ==
List of shipwrecks: 24 March 1870
Ship	State	Description
Aid	United Kingdom	The barque was driven ashore and wrecked at "Forredembarra", 8 nautical miles (15 km) west of Tarragona, Spain. Her crew were rescued.
Brigantine	United Kingdom	The ship was sighted off Havre de Grâce, Seine-Inférieure, France whilst on a voyage from Llanelly, Glamorgan to Caen, Calvados, France. No further trace, presumed foundered in the English Channel with the loss of all hands.
Crested Wave	United Kingdom	The barque foundered in the Atlantic Ocean 180 nautical miles (330 km) north west of Lisbon, Portugal. Her crew took to a boat; they were rescued five days later by the schooner Leon Jean (France). Crested Wave was on a voyage from Ancona, Papal States to Glasgow, Renfrewshire.
Manuelo	Spain	The ship ran aground on the Longsand, in the North Sea off the coast of Essex, United Kingdom. She was on a voyage from Antwerp, Belgium to Havana, Cuba. She was refloated and taken in to Ramsgate, Kent, United Kingdom.
Margarets	United Kingdom	The ship was driven ashore and wrecked at Spittal Point, Wigtownshire. Her crew were rescued by the Berwick upon Tweed Lifeboat Albert Victor ( Royal National Lifeboat Institution). Margarets was on a voyage from Liverpool, Lancashire to Berwick upon Tweed, Northumberland.
Mary Ismay	United Kingdom	The ship ran aground on Scroby Sands, Norfolk. She was on a voyage from Newcastle upon Tyne, Northumberland to Dublin. She was refloated and taken in to Harwich, Essex in a leaky condition.
Tréport	France	The ship ran aground off the Mumbles, Glamorgan, United Kingdom. She was refloated and taken in to Swansea, Glamorgan.

== 25 March ==
List of shipwrecks: 25 March 1870
Ship	State	Description
Alexandra, or Princess Alexandra	United Kingdom	The lugger was struck a submerged object and sank on the Goodwin Sands, Kent whilst assisting in the salvage of items from the wreck of Germania (Bremen). Her eleven crew were rescued.
Brother Jonathan	United Kingdom	The tug collided with the steamship Beatriz (Spain) and sank in the River Mersey. Her crew survived. Brpther Jonathan was raised on 19 August 1872.
Corrèze	France	The ship was driven ashore on Gorée, Senegal and was severely damaged.
Eliza	United Kingdom	The schooner ran aground and was beached at Sunderland, County Durham, where she was wrecked. Her six crew were rescued by rocket apparatus. She was on a voyage from Inverness to Sunderland.
Familiens Haab	Norway	The brig was abandoned in the North Sea 60 nautical miles (110 km) east by south of Great Yarmouth, Norfolk, United Kingdom. Her crew were rescued by the smack Faith (United Kingdom). Familiens Haab was on a voyage from Fredrikstad to Greenhithe, Kent, United Kingdom. She was taken in to Great Yarmouth in a derelict condition by two smacks on 28 March.
Industrie	Denmark	The brig was wrecked at Tunis, Beylik of Tunis. Her crew were rescued.
Iquique	Chile	The schooner was wrecked at Mejillones. Her crew were rescued.
Mercurius	United Kingdom	The clipper, a barque, was wrecked on the Rocas Reef, in the Atlantic Ocean (3°52′S 33°20′W) with the loss of all but six of her crew. The survivors were rescued on 15 May by the barque Silver Craig (United Kingdom). Mercurius was on the return leg of her maiden voyage, from Sydney, New South Wales to the Clyde via San Francisco, California.
Swallow	Flag unknown	The brig was wrecked on the Molasses Reef, south west of Inagua, Bahamas. She was on a voyage from Saint-Marc, Haiti to Falmouth, Cornwall, United Kingdom.

== 26 March ==
List of shipwrecks: 26 March 1870
Ship	State	Description
Aurora's Increase	United Kingdom	The smack was run down and sunk by the barque Æolus (Norway) off the Sunk Sand, in the North Sea off the coast of Essex. Her crew were rescued by Æolus.
Cicero	United Kingdom	The brig ran aground on the Barber Sand, in the North Sea off the coast of Norfolk. She was refloated and taken in to Great Yarmouth, Norfolk in a severely leaky condition.
Havila	United Kingdom	The ship was damaged by fire at sea. The fire was extinguished with assistance from HMS Rodney (Royal Navy). Havila was on a voyage from Algoa Bay to the River Thames.
Industrie	United Kingdom	The ship sprang a leak and was beached near Tunis, Beylik of Tunis. She was on a voyage from Agrigento, Sicily, Italy to London.
Kate Sancton	United Kingdom	The ship was driven ashore and damaged at Ardrossan, Ayrshire. She was refloated. She was on a voyage from Liverpool, Lancashire to Ardrossan. She was refloated on 29 March and taken in to Ardrossan.
No. 11	Trinity House	The lighter was run into and sunk in the River Thames by the steamship Boston (United Kingdom) with the loss of two lives.

== 27 March ==
List of shipwrecks: 27 March 1870
Ship	State	Description
Eliza	United Kingdom	The ship was driven ashore and wrecked at Sunderland, County Durham. She was on a voyage from Inverness to Sunderland.
Evangelista	Greece	The brig was wrecked at "Liscia", Sardinia, Italy.
Luigi Rossa	Italy	The ship ran aground at Cape Helles, Ottoman Empire. She was on a voyage from Leith, Lothian, United Kingdom to Constantinople, Ottoman Empire. She was refloated with assistance.
Maria Louise	United Kingdom	The ship was driven ashore 30 nautical miles (56 km) north of the mouth of the Rio Grande. She was on a voyage from the Rio Grande to Falmouth, Cornwall.
Moelwyn	United Kingdom	The ship struck the East Platters Rocks, off Anglesey and sank. Her crew were rescued. She was on a voyage from Par, Cornwall to Runcorn, Cheshire.
Prince Kung	China	The steamship was wrecked on Crab Island. Her crew were rescued. She was on a voyage from Foo Chow Foo to Shanghai.
Tamatave	France	The full-rigged ship foundered in the Atlantic Ocean. Her fourteen crew were rescued by the barque Texas (Bremen). Tamatave was on a voyage from Havana, Cuba to the Belle Île, Morbihan.

== 28 March ==
List of shipwrecks: 28 March 1870
Ship	State	Description
Anglo-Saxon	United Kingdom	The ship was wrecked on the Morant Cays, off the coast of Jamaica. Her crew were rescued. She was on a voyage from Liverpool, Lancashire to Mobile, Alabama, United States.
Blackburn	United Kingdom	The ship was run into by Sweet Home (United Kingdom) and sank 4.5 nautical miles (8.3 km) south east of Inchcape, Forfarshire. Her crew were rescued by Sweet Home.
Intrepid	United Kingdom	The barque foundered in the Mediterranean Sea (37°40′N 2°00′E). Her fifteen crew took to a boat; they were rescued the next day by the steamship Ionia (United Kingdom). Intrepid was on a voyage from Cardiff, Glamorgan to Barcelona, Spain.
James Holmes	United Kingdom	The barque was run into by the steamship Resolute (United Kingdom) in the River Thames. She was on a voyage from London to L'Orient, Morbihan, France. She put back to London.

== 29 March ==
List of shipwrecks: 9 March 1870
Ship	State	Description
Fortuna Promessa	Italy	The ship was wrecked at the mouth of the Ebro with the loss of a crew member. She was on a voyage from "Burrazzano" to Buenos Aires, Argentina.

== 31 March ==
List of shipwrecks: 31 March 1870
Ship	State	Description
Conservative	United Kingdom	The ship was wrecked on the Mull of Galloway, Wigtownshire. Her crew were rescued.
County of Ayr	United Kingdom	The ship ran aground at Hellevoetsluis, Zeeland, Netherlands. She was on a voyage from Rotterdam, South Holland, Netherlands to Glasgow, Renfrewshire.
Cricket	United States	The ship was driven ashore at Cape Charles, Virginia. She was on a voyage from Rio de Janeiro, Brazil to Baltimore, Maryland. She was refloated in April.
Danube	United Kingdom	The steamship was driven ashore on the coast of County Wexford. She was on a voyage from Liverpool, Lancashire to Shanghai, China. She was refloated with the assistance of the tug Ruby (United Kingdom).
St. Petersburg	Netherlands	The schooner struck a sunken wreck 25 nautical miles (46 km) off Land's End, Cornwall, United Kingdom and foundered. Her crew were rescued by the barque Conobbi (Italy). St. Petersburg was on a voyage from Glasgow to Rotterdam.
Unnamed	Flag unknown	The ship sank between the Île d'Yeu and "De Pilier", Vendée, France.

== Unknown date ==
List of shipwrecks: Unknown date in March 1870
Ship	State	Description
Agnete	Denmark	The ship was driven ashore at "Osterly", near Fredrikshavn. She was on a voyage from Burntisland, Fife, United Kingdom to Rønne.
Ailsa	United Kingdom	The ship ran aground at Philadelphia, Pennsylvania, United States. She was on a voyage from Philadelphia to Liverpool, Lancashire.
Amelia Gehring	Belgium	The ship was wrecked on Lobes Keys. She was on a voyage from Antwerp to New Orleans, Louisiana, United States.
Annie Gardney	United States	The ship ran aground at New York. She was on a voyage from Demerara, British Guiana to New York.
Annie M. Palmer	United States	The ship was destroyed by fire in the Guañape Islands, Peru.
Arcturus	United Kingdom	The steamship ran aground off Bornholm, Denmark. She was refloated and resumed her voyage.
Artos	United Kingdom	The steamship was driven ashore in the Sea of Marmara at "Dagansaler", Ottoman Empire. She was on a voyage from Odesa, Russia to an English port.
Atala	Italy	The barque was wrecked at Lebu, Chile. Her crew were rescued.
Banquerian	United States	The ship ran aground. She was on a voyage from Pensacola, Florida to Montevideo, Uruguay.
Benjamin Butler	United States	The schooner collided with another vessel and sank in "New York Sound" with the loss of four lives.
British Eagle	United Kingdom	The ship was wrecked at Cape Canso, Nova Scotia, Canada.
Caransius	United Kingdom	The barque was abandoned in the Atlantic Ocean before 4 March. She was on a voyage from London to Boston, Massachusetts, United States.
Cardenas	Flag unknown	The ship was driven ashore at Cárdenas, Cuba.
Carmelia	Malta	The ship collided with Villeneuve (France) and was the run ashore and wrecked at Mogador, Morocco.
Carrie M. Rich	United States	The ship was lost in the Indian River. She was on a voyage from Trinidad to Boston, Massachusetts.
Catharina	United Kingdom	The ship was abandoned at sea. She was on a voyage from Rio de Janeiro, Brazil to Falmouth, Cornwall.
Clara Zoe	Monaco	The ship ran aground. She was refloated and towed in to Trieste.
Clemence	France	The ship was wrecked at Gaza, Egypt before 12 March
Constantine	Flag unknown	The ship was wrecked at Barletta, Italy.
Dorothea	Bremen	The ship was driven ashore on "Scholtwarden". She was on a voyage from Bremen to Bahia, Brazil. She was refloated and put back to Bremen.
Dotka Svansea	Flag unknown	The ship was wrecked on the Colorados, off the coast of Cuba.
Douglas	United Kingdom	The ship was driven ashore in the Hooghly River. She was refloated and taken in to Diamond Harbour, India.
Eliza	United States	The ship caught fire in Hobson's Bay. She was on a voyage from Quebec City, Canada to an American port.
Elizabeth and Jane	United Kingdom	The schooner was severely damaged by fire at Preston, Lancashire in early March.
Esule	Italy	The ship was lost at "Gioja".
Ethel	United States	The ship was driven ashore on Bimini, Bahamas. She was on a voyage from Matanzas, Cuba to Philadelphia. She was refloated and taken in to Nassau, Bahamas for repairs.
Eugenia	Italy	The ship was wrecked at Cape Teulada, Sardinia. She was on a voyage from "Sampoyard" to Rouen, Seine-Inférieure.
Fairy	United Kingdom	The ship was driven ashore at Mogador. She was consequently condemned.
Four Brothers	United Kingdom	The ship foundered in the Sea of Marmara.
Frederick	United Kingdom	The ship was destroyed by fire. She was on a voyage from Hong Kong] to Callao, Peru.
Goodman	United Kingdom	The brig was wrecked on the English Bank, in the River Plate before 18 March.
Gratitude	United Kingdom	The ship was driven ashore at Castletown, Isle of Man. She was on a voyage from Whitehaven, Cumberland to Carlingford, County Louth.
Hebe	United Kingdom	The ship was wrecked at "Aghatchli", Russia with the loss of all but four of her crew. She was on a voyage from Odesa to an English port.
Isaac Baker	United States	The ship foundered. She was on a voyage from Matanzas to Philadelphia.
Kotka	United Kingdom	The ship was wrecked on the Colorados, off the coast of Cuba before 18 March. She was on a voyage from Swansea, Glamorgan to Havana, Cuba.
Langley	Colony of British Columbia	The ship was wrecked in the Chatham Strait.
Laura, Laura Carlsen, or Laura Ninirh Cailu	Flag unknown	The ship was driven ashore at Gallipoli, Ottoman Empire. She was on a voyage from Odesa to Toulon, Var, France.
Lesbian	United Kingdom	The ship foundered in the Dogger Bank. She was on a voyage from Middlesbrough, Yorkshire to Swinemünde, Prussia.
Lily	United Kingdom	The smack collided with the steamship H. A. Brightman (United Kingdom) and sank near Newport, Monmouthshire. Lily was on a voyage from Newport to Bideford, Devon. She was later refloated.
Lizzie	United Kingdom	The ship ran aground on the Northern Triangles. She was on a voyage from Belize City, British Honduras to Cork. She was refloated and resumed her voyage.
Margaret	United Kingdom	The ship was driven ashore and wrecked at Whitburn, County Durham. She was on a voyage from Sunderland, County Durham to Aberdeen.
Maulins	United States	The ship was driven ashore in Delaware Bay. She was on a voyage from Matanzas to Philadelphia.
Melrose Abbey	United Kingdom	The ship ran aground in the Yangtze. She was on a voyage from the Clyde to Shanghai, China.
Nino	United Kingdom	The schooner ran aground at Wexford.
Norge	Norway	The ship was destroyed by fire at Trump Key. She was on a voyage from Havana to Falmouth.
Peri	United States	The ship was driven ashore in Chesapeake Bay. She was on a voyage from Trinidad to Baltimore, Maryland.
Pichetto	Italy	The ship was wrecked near Milazzo, Sicily before 29 March. She was on a voyage from Odesa to Cannes, Alpes-Maritimes, France.
Prosperity	United Kingdom	The schooner was driven ashore near Hurst Castle, Hampshire. She was refloated on 29 March and resumed her voyage.
Quiz	(United Kingdom of Great Britain and Ireland) Jersey	The ship was lost at "Gioja".
Rival	United Kingdom	The ship was wrecked on "Paloma Island", near Maldonado, Uruguay with the loss of her captain. The wreck was plundered by the local inhabitants. She was on a voyage from Buenos Aires, Argentina to Falmouth, Cornwall.
Severn	United Kingdom	The steamship ran aground off Bornholm. She was refloated and resumed her voyage.
Seguranca	Portugal	The ship was wrecked on the Cabadello, near Porto. Her crew were rescued. She was on a voyage from Pernambuco, Brazil to Porto.
Spider	United Kingdom	The barge capsized and sank at Portsmouth, Hampshire.
Star	United Kingdom	The ship was wrecked on the Conche Reef. She was on a voyage from Caibarién, Cuba to Falmouth.
Starjola	United Kingdom	The brig ran aground on the Roughs, off the coast of Essex. She was on a voyage from Sombrero, Antigua to Ipswich, Suffolk. She was refloated with assistance and taken in to Harwich, Essex.
St. Dunstan's	United Kingdom	The barque was wrecked at Cape King, near Yokohama, Japan with the loss of four lives.
Sunshine	United Kingdom	The ship was wrecked at the mouth of the Sarawak River. She was on a voyage from Manila, Spanish East Indies to Sarawak, Malaya.
Syra	United Kingdom	The barque was driven ashore near the Cárdenas Lighthouse, Cuba. She was on a voyage from Saint John, New Brunswick, Canada to Cárdenas.
Thessares Adelfi	Flag unknown	The ship was lost in the Sea of Marmara.
Tibre	France	The steamship was driven ashore at Latakia, Ottoman Syria. Her passengers were taken off. She was later refloated.
Trojan	United States	The ship was driven ashore at Scituate, Massachusetts. She was on a voyage from Ponce, Puerto Rico to [Boston, Massachusetts.
Tropic Bird	Canada	The ship ran aground on Marina Cay, Virgin Islands. She was on a voyage from Saint John, New Brunswick to Cuba. She was refloated and taken in to Green Turtle Cay, Bahamas.
Veritas	United Kingdom	The ship foundered. Shew as on a voyage from Llanelly, Glamorgan to Nantes, Loire-Inférieure.
W. A. Vail	United States	The ship was driven ashore in the Indian River. She was on a voyage from Tampico, Mexico to New York.
William F. Poole	United States	The fishing schooner was lost on the Georges Bank. lost with all 10 hands.
Unnamed	Regia Marina	The gunboat was wrecked on the coast of Egypt with the loss of seven lives.
