= Ormesby St Margaret with Scratby =

Parish in Norfolk, England

Coordinates: 52.674613°N 1.697474°E

- Civil parish
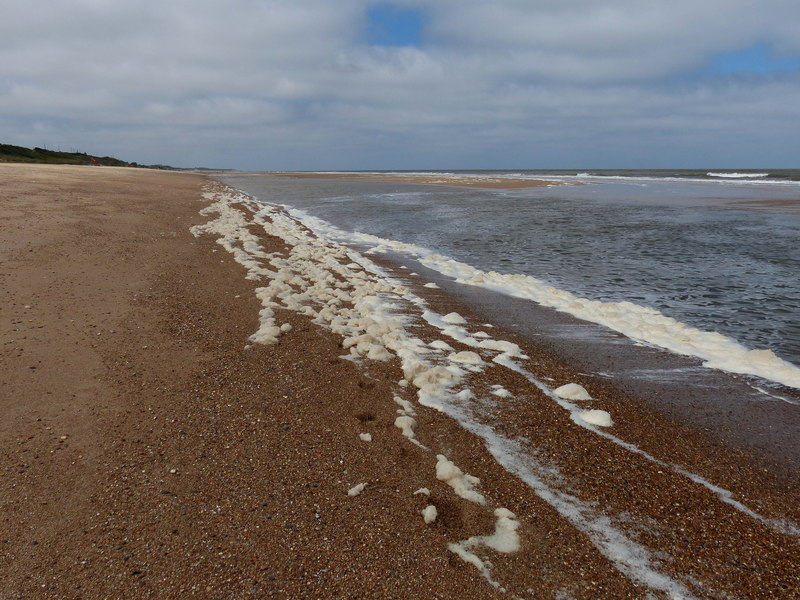
- Scratby Beach

- Location within Norfolk
- Area: 7.32 km^{2} (2.83 sq mi)
- Population: 4,394 (2021)
  - Density: 600/km^{2} (1,600/sq mi)
- OS grid reference: TG 494 148
- Civil parish: Ormesby St Margaret with Scratby
- District: Great Yarmouth
- Shire county: Norfolk
- Region: East
- Country: England
- Sovereign state: United Kingdom
- Post town: GREAT YARMOUTH
- Postcode district: NR29
- Dialling code: 01493
- Police: Norfolk
- Fire: Norfolk
- Ambulance: East of England
- UK Parliament: Great Yarmouth
- Website: ormesbypc.norfolkparishes.gov.uk

Ormesby St Margaret with Scratby is a civil parish in the Borough of Great Yarmouth in Norfolk, England. It is made up of the inland village of Ormesby St Margaret and the adjacent seaside resorts of Scratby and California. The villages are some 1 mi (1.6 km) apart, and they are situated about 6 mi (9.7 km) north of the town of Great Yarmouth and 19 mi (31 km) east of the city of Norwich.

The civil parish has an area of 729.32 ha (2.82 sq mi) and in the 2021 census had a population of 4,394, up more than 10 per cent from the 3,974 recorded in the 2011 Census.

Great Ormesby railway station was once located in Ormesby St Margaret as well as halts at Scratby and California on the line between Great Yarmouth and Melton Constable. It was closed in 1959.

== Toponymy ==
The name Ormesby means the settlement of a man called Ormr in Old English, while Scratby means the settlement of a man called Skrauti. California is reputed to have derived its name from the discovery of some 16th-century gold coins on the beach in 1848, at a time when the California gold rush had captured the attention of the world.

== Governance ==
For the purposes of local government, the parish falls within the district of Great Yarmouth. Ormesby electoral ward includes Ormesby St Michael, a small village lying some 2 mi (3.2 km) to the west. The ward had a total population at the 2011 Census of 4,268.

== Parish church ==
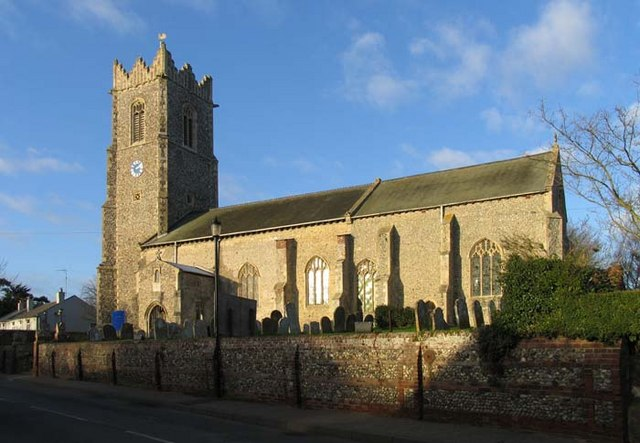
St Margaret's Parish Church

St Margaret's Parish Church in Ormesby St Margaret dates back to the 14th and 15th centuries and underwent restoration by Richard Phipson in the 19th century. Inside the church there are monumental brasses to Robert and Elizabeth Clere, who left £10 towards the building of a steeple, and their daughter-in-law Alice Clere, who was the aunt of Anne Boleyn. Stained glass dates from the 20th century and was produced by a number of different workshops. St Margaret's is a Grade II* listed building.

== Ormesby Old Hall ==
The Grade II* listed Old Hall is a brick house of the mid 17th century, re-fronted and remodelled in 1735. It was the home of architect Robert William Edis.

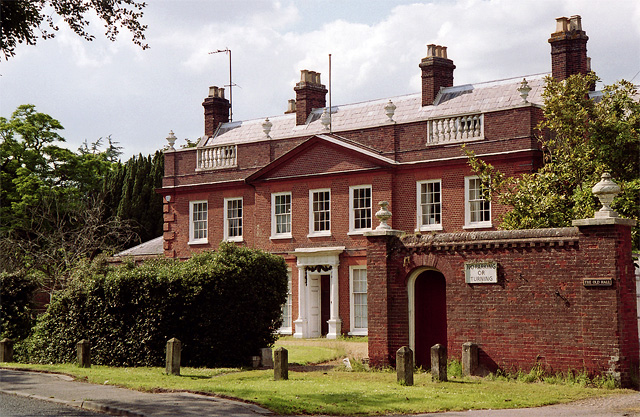
Ormesby Old Hall

== Scratby Hall ==
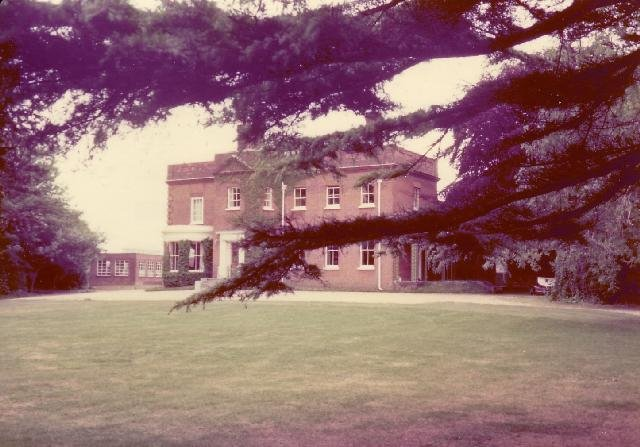
Scratby Hall

Scratby Hall was built by John Fisher in about 1750, possibly incorporating elements from an earlier building. It was acquired by John Ramey, a lawyer and mayor of Great Yarmouth, who moved into the property on his retirement, having previously leased it to the diarist Sylas Neville. Ramey's daughter Abigail lived in the house following the death in 1786 of her husband, Reverend Alexander Home, 9th Earl of Home. The house underwent substantial additions during the 19th century. From 1949 to the mid-1980s, the home and estate served as Duncan Hall School. After the closure of the school, the Hall became a private residence. It was damaged by a fire in 1989.

== Notable residents ==
- Zonia Bowen, writer, was born in Ormesby St Margaret.
- John Clere (died 1557) (son of Robert and Alice Clere) Member of Parliament and naval commander.
- Sir Edmund Lacon, 2nd Baronet, Member of Parliament for Great Yarmouth.
- Robert William Edis, architect, lived in Ormesby Old Hall.
