= Thomas Clere =

English poet (??–1545)

Sir Thomas Clere (died 1545) was a successful poet at the court of Henry VIII. He is commemorated in several poems by Henry Howard, Earl of Surrey, with whom he had a very close friendship. He was engaged to Mary Shelton, a former mistress of the King's, in 1545, but died before their love match could be made into a marriage.

Thomas Clere was the third son of Sir Robert Clere (c.1493 - 10 August 1529) of Ormesby St. Margaret, Norfolk, and his wife Alice, the daughter of Sir William Boleyn and his wife Margaret Ormond (otherwise Butler), daughter and co-heiress of Thomas Butler, 7th Earl of Ormond. Alice was the sister of Thomas Boleyn, 1st Earl of Wiltshire, and the aunt of King Henry VIII's second Queen, Anne Boleyn. Sir Thomas Clere was thus Queen Anne Boleyn's first cousin.

His mother Alice Clere died in 1538, and left the family estates to his older brother John Clere. She left Thomas "a salt of gold with a cover having a rose in the knop, and a pair of beads of gold" set with stones (a rosary) which had been gifts from Anne Boleyn.

Clere died on 14 April 1545 from wounds received at the siege of Montreuil in 1544, fighting for the Earl of Surrey.

Thomas Clere was buried in the Church of St Mary at Lambeth in Surrey. In his will, he made a bequest to his cousin Mary Shelton. His monumental brass is currently in storage.

His nephew, Robert Clere was killed at the battle of Pinkie in 1547.
