= Duncan Hall School =

Prep school in Ormesby St Margaret with Scratby, Norfolk, England

Coordinates: 52°40′43″N 1°42′02″E

Duncan Hall School was a boys’ prep school at Scratby Hall in Scratby, Norfolk from 1949 to 1986, with girls admitted from 1979. Prior to occupying Scratby Hall, it was located in Great Yarmouth and was called Duncan House.

== Origins ==
The founder of the school was Daniel Tomkins (1826–1902), the son of Joseph Tomkins, a farmer, and Elizabeth Wait. He came from a Dissenting family, and was baptised in 1826 by the famous preacher and social reformer Rowland Hill in the Bristol Tabernacle. He was married first to Frances Shaw and secondly to Caroline Katie Fellows.

Tomkins's first school in Yarmouth was the Great Yarmouth College, at 28 South Quay, which he opened in 1864. One of the students at this school was his son, Oliver Tomkins, who became a Congregationalist missionary in Papua, where, in 1901, he was eaten by cannibals.

== Duncan House ==
Tomkins opened a further school on the South Quay in 1898. This school had various names, and the records are held at the National Archives for the period 1897 to 1915 under the names Great Yarmouth British School and Daniel Tomkins’ Council School. By 1901 he had retired to Little Plumstead, and the following year he died in Blofield.

Kelly’s Directory of 1912 refers to the school as Daniel Tomkins, by then on St George's Road, erected 1813, although this is the year of the building not the school itself. By this point the headmaster was John Dawson Gobbett.

Bernard Eaton Pledger became headmaster in 1919. After WWI, the school moved to Camperdown, at which point it was named Duncan House, after Admiral Duncan, the victor of the Battle of Camperdown. In the 1930s the school moved again, to Albert Sq. The Albert Square building is now the St George Hotel.

Initially, the school remained open during WWII. A member of staff, Percy Smowton, was killed by a bomb blast while on fire duty in 1941, following which the school closed and the boys were evacuated to North Wales.

Duncan House reopened in Albert Square in 1946 with Reginald Morgan-Hughes as headmaster. In 1949 the school moved to Scratby Hall, and changed its name to Duncan Hall School.

== Scratby Hall ==
Scratby Hall was built in 1750 by John Fisher, a Yarmouth merchant and Mayor in 1767. He let it to the diarist Sylas Neville in 1769. Neville left in 1772; he returned in 1783 and commented that the building was much changed. It was subsequently owned by John Ramey until his death in 1796, and then by his daughter, the Dowager Countess of Home until her death in 1814. This Countess of Home was Abigail Browne Ramey, the third wife of the 9th Earl. Her daughter, Lady Charlotte Baillie-Hamilton, sold it to the Rev Richard Foster, Vicar of Ormesby St Margaret with Scratby, 1835 to 1865. It was then owned by a Yarmouth brewer, Samuel Nightingale, and, after his death, his widow Catherine. The final owners of the hall as a house were their son, another Samuel Nightingale, and his wife.

== Duncan Hall School ==
Verdun Searles was the owner (called the Principal) in 1968. At this point F J O’Brien was the headmaster. The final owner was David Rawnsley. The school was run through a corporate structure. That company, from 1961 to 1983, was V H Searles Limited, and then called Duncan Hall School Limited from 1983 to 1988.

Girls were introduced to the school in 1979, although an advertisement for the school in 1982 makes no mention of girls.

The motto was bene vivere disce, meaning ‘learn to live well’.

== Closure ==
The school closed in 1986. The following year, Scratby Hall was Grade II listed. Scratby Hall suffered extensive fire damage in 1989, but was rebuilt, and has now been turned into apartments.

== Old Duncanians ==
There is an active Old Duncanians Association.

• Peter Jay, owner of The Hippodrome
