= Caister Camp Halt railway station =

Former railway station in Norfolk, England

Coordinates: 52.65961°N 1.72788°E

Caister Camp Halt
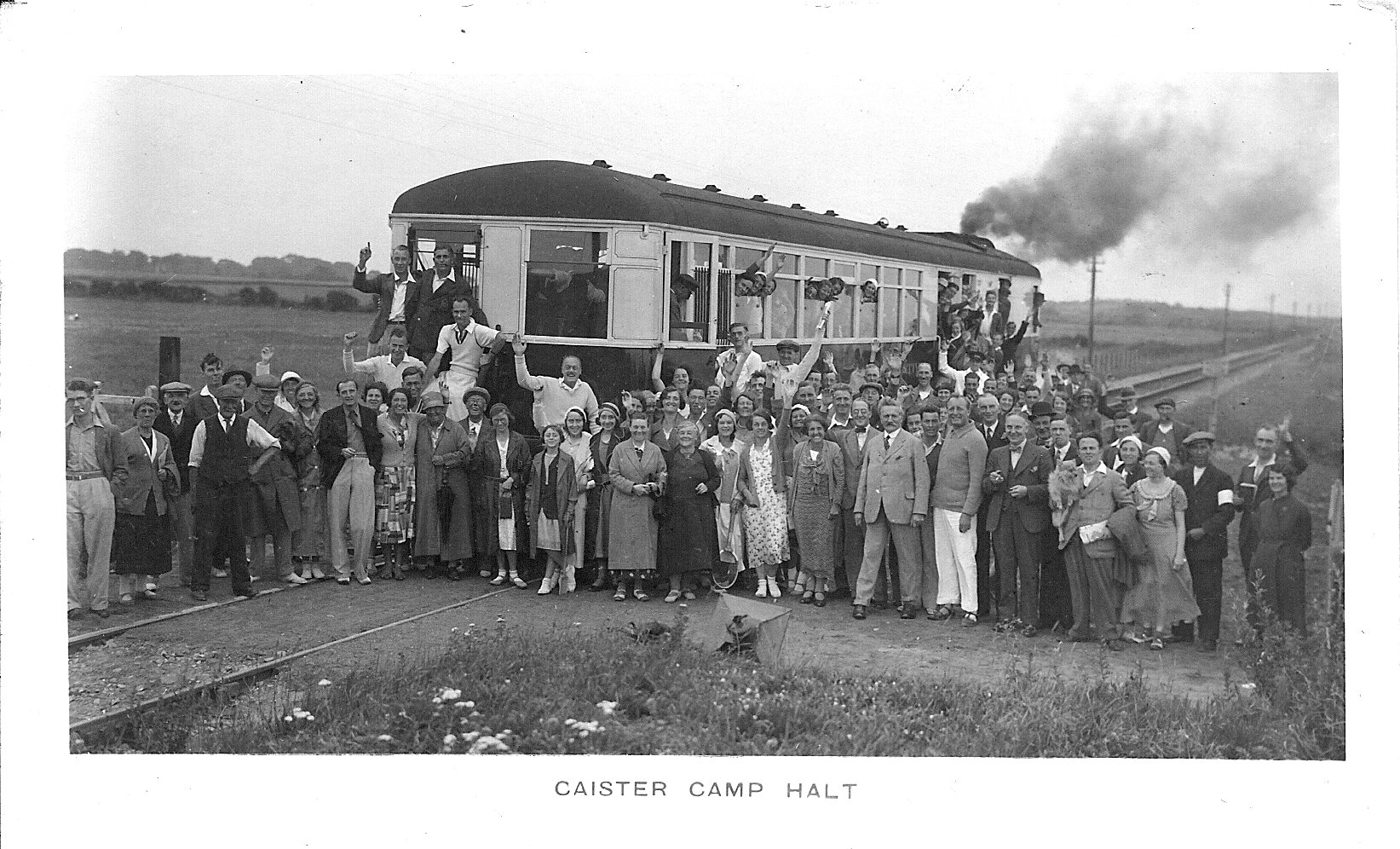

General information
- Location: Caister-on-Sea, Great Yarmouth; England
- Grid reference: TG522134
- Platforms: 1

Other information
- Status: Disused

History
- Post-grouping: Midland and Great Northern Joint Railway; Eastern Region of British Railways

Key dates
- 17 July 1933: Opened
- September 1939: Closed
- June 1948: Reopened
- 27 September 1958: Last day of services
- 2 March 1959: Official closure
Location

Caister Camp Halt was a railway station on the Midland and Great Northern Joint Railway which served the holiday camps near the coastal village of Caister-on-Sea, in Norfolk, England.

== History ==
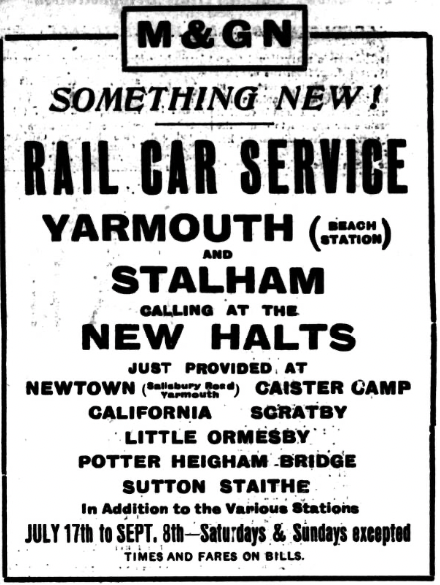
Advertisement from the Yarmouth Independent on Saturday 15 July 1933

In 1933 the Midland and Great Northern Joint Railway introduced a small railcar “Tantivy” to enhance the summer service on the line between Yarmouth and Stalham. This allowed the introduction of seven new halts, which saved people walking a mile or more to the nearest station. The new halts were for Newtown, Caister Holiday Camp, California, Scratby, Little Ormesby, Potter Heigham Bridge and Sutton Staithe. Each of these was a request stop

The station was closed as a wartime measure before passing briefly to the Eastern Region of British Railways on nationalisation in 1948 only to be closed by the British Railways in 1959.

Preceding station	Disused railways	Following station
California Halt	Midland and Great Northern; Yarmouth Line	Caister-on-Sea
