= Olive Edis =

British photographer (1876–1955)

Mary Olive Edis
- Autochrome self-portrait
- Born: 3 September 1876; London, England
- Died: 28 December 1955 (aged 79)
- Occupation: Photographer
- Spouse: Edwin Galsworthy (m. 1928)

Mary Olive Edis, later Edis-Galsworthy (3 September 1876 – 28 December 1955), was a British photographer and businesswoman who, throughout her career, owned several studios in London and Norfolk.

Known primarily for her studio portrait photography, Edis's sitters ranged from royalty to politicians, to influential women, and Norfolk fisherfolk. Edis was one of the first women to adopt the autochrome process professionally and became Britain's first official female war photographer in 1919.

== Life ==
Edis, born at 22 Wimpole Street, London, was the eldest daughter of Mary née Murray (1853–1931) and Arthur Wellesley Edis, FRCP (1840–1893), a gynaecologist and senior physician to the Chelsea Hospital for Women. Her paternal aunt was preacher and social activist Isabella Reaney (née Edis) and her uncle was architect Robert William Edis. Edis grew up with her parents and younger, twin-sisters, Katharine and Emmeline until the sudden death of their father, aged 53, when Edis was 17 years old.

Caroline "Carrie" Murray, daughter to Surgeon General John Murray, a well-known photographer in India, gave Edis her first camera and became the subject of Edis's first attempt at a photographic portrait in 1900. By 1905, Edis and her sister Katharine had opened a professional studio on Church Street, in Sheringham, North Norfolk. Katharine left the studio in 1907 when she married local doctor Robert Legat. Edis, however, continued to build the businesses and divided her time between studios in Sheringham and Notting Hill, London. Meanwhile, Katharine pursued her photography privately and continued to show considerable skill in both black and white and autochrome photography.

Edis married Edwin Galsworthy, a solicitor and director of Barclay's Bank, in 1928 at the age of 52, and became stepmother to his two adult children Margaret Eleanor and Gerald.

== Career ==
Edis's first studio on Church Street, Sheringham, was purpose built for the Edis sisters by their uncle the architect Robert William Edis. It had a glass roof to allow in natural daylight which became an important aspect of her trademark style. In the 1930s her London studio was relocated to Ladbroke Square and a new studio was built in Sheringham on South Street. During her career she also opened smaller, temporary studios in Cromer and Farnham. Edis employed several assistants at her Sheringham studio, the longest serving of whom was Lillian Page who did most of the studio's printing. Edis produced postcards of her work, featuring fisherfolk, famous sitters and the photographer herself. Clients who ordered photographs would receive them mounted on card embossed with her logo.

Edis took her first autochrome portrait in 1912 and became known for her colour photography. Edis patented her own diascope, a device for viewing autochromes which allowed them to be backlit. Edis won a medal with her autochrome Portrait Study at the Royal Photographic Society's 1913 exhibition, and became a fellow of the Society the next year.

Edis was appointed an official war artist and photographed British Women's Services and the battlefields of France and Flanders between 1918 and 1919 for the Imperial War Museum. In 1920 she was commissioned to create advertising photographs for the Canadian Pacific Railway and her autochromes of this trip to Canada are believed to be some of the earliest colour photographs of that country.

Throughout her career Edis photographed many influential figures of early 20th century society. Notable examples include authors Thomas Hardy (1914) and George Bernard Shaw (1936); prime ministers H. H. Asquith (1917–18) and David Lloyd George (1917) and the future King George VI (c.1920s). Edis photographed many prominent women at a time of great change for the role of women in British society including Elizabeth Garrett Anderson (1909), Ethel Smyth (1916), Nancy Astor (1920) and Emmeline Pankhurst (1920). As well as famous sitters, Edis produced many portraits of local working fisherman their families at her studios in North Norfolk. Working in fashionable seaside towns of Sheringham and Cromer, these fishermen became minor local celebrities in their own right.

=== Photography for the Imperial War Museum ===
The idea that the Imperial War Museum (originally The National War Museum) should recruit a photographer to focus on woman's activities on the western front came from the museum's Women's Work Subcommittee chaired by Priscilla Norman. Edis was first invited to be the museum's photographer in October 1918. The original plan was for the photography tour to take place in November 1918 but this was delayed by the end of the war and Priscilla Norman catching the flu. The tour eventually took place in March 1919 with Edis being supported by Priscilla Norman and Agnes Conway (daughter of the museum's then director general). The museum received 171 photographs as a result of the tour.

== Legacy ==
Edis died on 28 December 1955, and her ashes were interred at Sheringham Cemetery.

Following her husband's death in 1948, Edis presented some of her portraits to the National Portrait Gallery, and many of her war photographs remain in the collection of the Imperial War Museum. In 2008 Cromer Museum acquired a collection of over 2,000 images which had been left by Edis to her assistant, Cyril Nunn, and now holds the largest collection of her work in the world. The first, solo, retrospective exhibition of her work was held at Norwich Castle Museum and Art Gallery in 2016–17.

== Gallery ==
Arthur Foley Winnington-Ingram. Bishop of London. Autochrome portrait

Autochrome seascape.

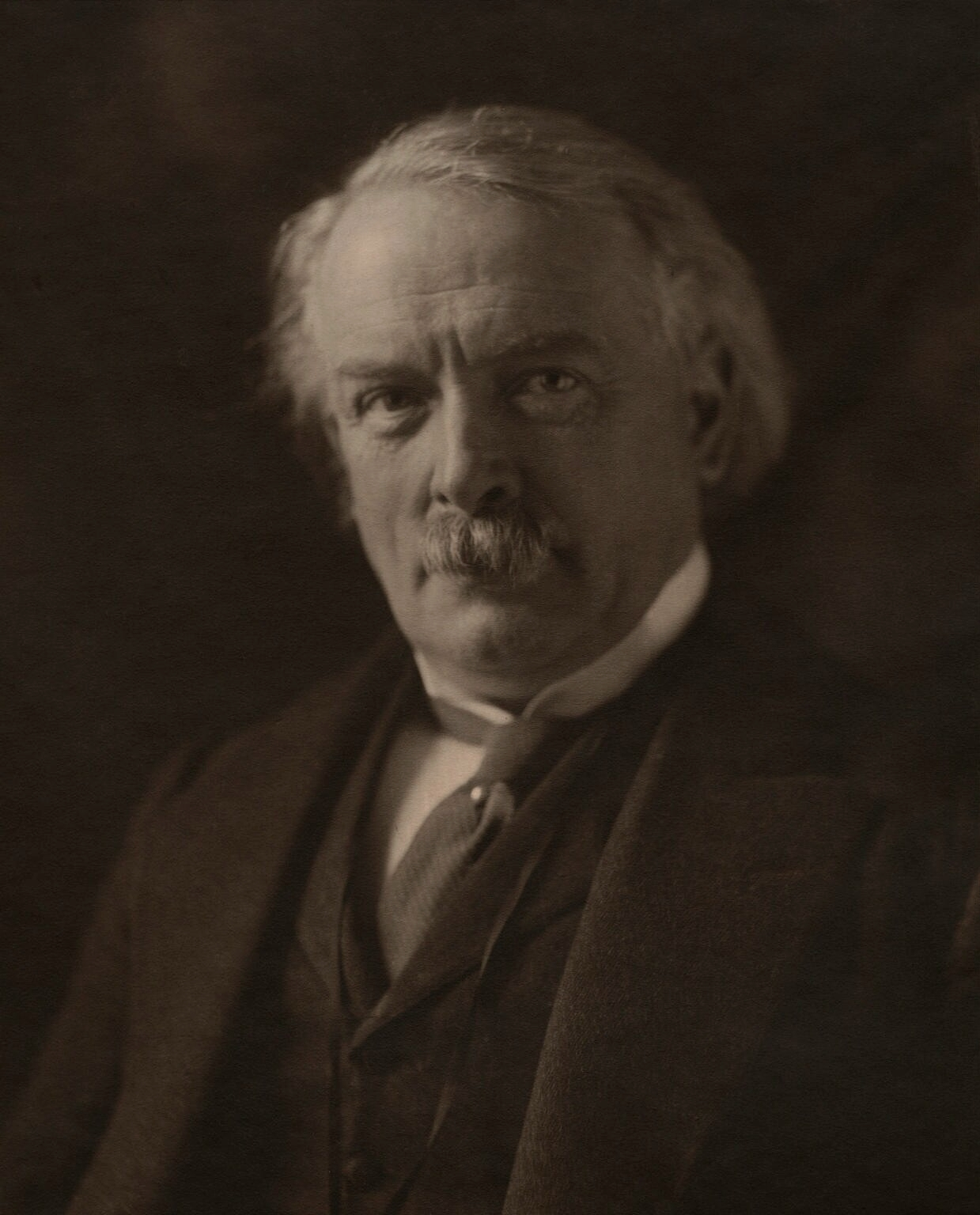
David Lloyd George. Platinum print portrait.
