= Robert William Edis =

Colonel Sir Robert William Edis KBE CB DL JP
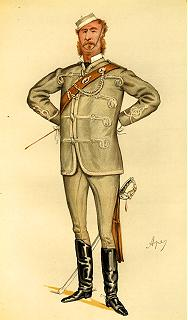
- "Architecture Militant", caricature of Edis by "Spy" (1885)
- Born: Robert William Edis; 13 June 1839; Huntingdon
- Died: 23 June 1927 (aged 88)
- Education: Huntingdon Grammar School; Aldenham School
- Spouse: Elizabeth Ann Woodward
- Children: 5
- Relatives: Isabella Reaney (sister); Olive Edis (niece)

Colonel Sir Robert William Edis KBE CB DL JP (13 June 1839 – 23 June 1927) was a British architect.

== Early life ==
Edis was born in Huntingdon to Emma and Robert Edis, also an architect. His sister was the preacher Isabella Reaney, his brother was Arthur Wellesley Edis, a gynaecologist, and his niece through Arthur was the photographer Olive Edis.

Edis was educated at Huntingdon Grammar School and Aldenham School, before attending University College School in London and studying at the Royal Academy Schools. He was then articled to William Gilbee Habershon and Edward Habershon, architects, in London.

== Career ==
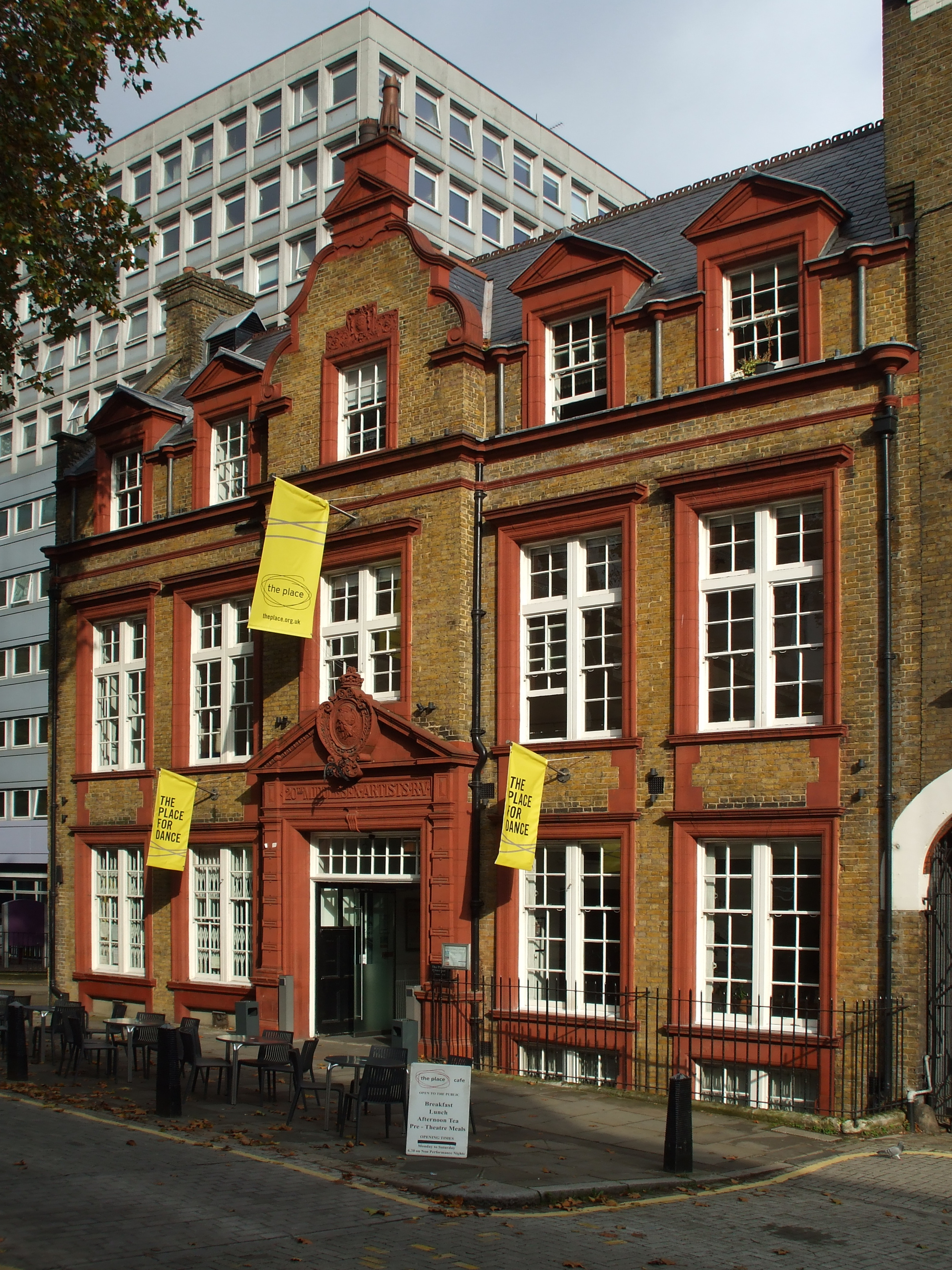
The Place, Duke's Road, Camden, built 1888 as the headquarters of the 20th Middlesex (Artists') Rifle Volunteer Corps

He became chief assistant to Anthony Salvin, and joined the Architectural Association in 1859. He was admitted an Associate of the Royal Institute of British Architects in 1862 and a fellow of the association in 1867.

Although his early work was Gothic, Edis later became a proponent of the Queen Anne style of baroque revival architecture. He worked mostly on private houses and public buildings, although he did design a few churches.

He later became involved in the Aesthetic Movement of decorative arts and in furniture design, and delivered a series of Cantor lectures on the subject at the Royal Society of Arts. These formed the basis of two books: Decoration and Furniture of Town Houses (1881) and Healthy Furniture and Decoration (1884). Combining principles of Aestheticism with the Sanitary Movement, Edis delivered a lecture during the 1884 International Health Exhibition calling for more artistic designs within hygienic interior objects.

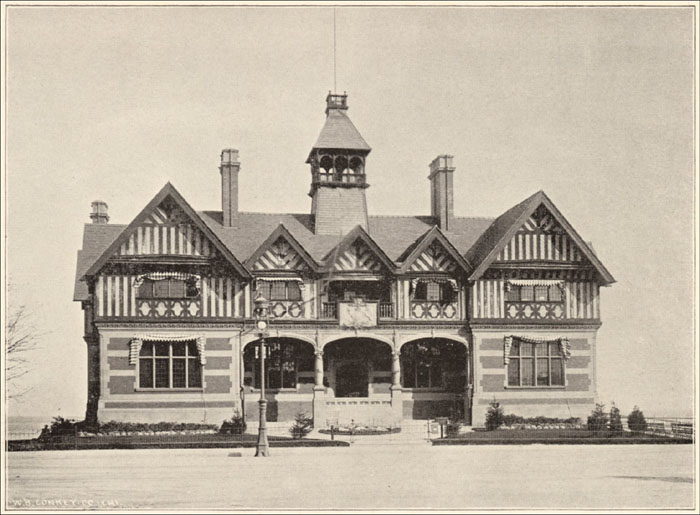
Great Britain building at the World's Columbian Exposition in 1893

From 1883, Edis extended and rebuilt Sandringham House in Norfolk for the Prince of Wales. He was the designer of the parish hall and parsonage for St Philip's Church, Buckingham Palace Road (1892) and the British pavilion at the World's Columbian Exposition in Chicago (1893).

He built a studio on Church Street, Sheringham, for his nieces the photographers Olive and Katharine Edis. It was their first studio and had a glass roof to allow in natural daylight which became an important aspect of their trademark style.

Edis had a long association with the Volunteer Force and its successor the Territorial Force. In 1868 he received a commission in the Artists' Rifles. He went on to be the regiment's commanding officer from 1883 to November 1902, and subsequently held the office of honorary colonel from 1902 until his death (he continued when the regiment was reorganized as part of the Territorial Force in 1908). He designed the unit's drill hall at Duke's Road, off Euston Road, Camden (now The Place, home of the Contemporary Dance Trust).

In January 1889 he was elected a member of the first London County Council, representing St Pancras South for three years as a member of the Conservative-backed Moderate Party.

== Personal life ==
In 1863, Edis married Elsie Jane Anton. He had homes at Ormesby Old Hall, Great Ormesby, Norfolk, as well as Fitzroy Square and Regent's Park, London. He was a justice of the peace and a Deputy Lieutenant for Norfolk from 1901. He was created a Knight Commander of the Order of the British Empire in 1919 for his military services.

Edis died suddenly at his Norfolk home in 1927, aged 88. He was predeceased by his wife and only son, but was survived by his five daughters.
