= Newtown Halt railway station =

Former railway station in Norfolk, England

Coordinates: 52.6201°N 1.7348°E

Newtown Halt

General information
- Location: Great Yarmouth, Great Yarmouth; England
- Grid reference: TG528090
- Platforms: 1

Other information
- Status: Disused

History
- Post-grouping: Midland and Great Northern Joint Railway; Eastern Region of British Railways

Key dates
- 17 July 1933: Opened
- September 1939: Closed
- June 1948: Reopened
- 2 March 1959: Closed
Location

Newtown Halt was a railway station on the Midland and Great Northern Joint Railway (M&GN) which served the northern part of Great Yarmouth in Norfolk, England. Opened in 1933, it was closed as a wartime economy measure and reopened in 1948 only to last a further eleven years before closing with the line.

== History ==
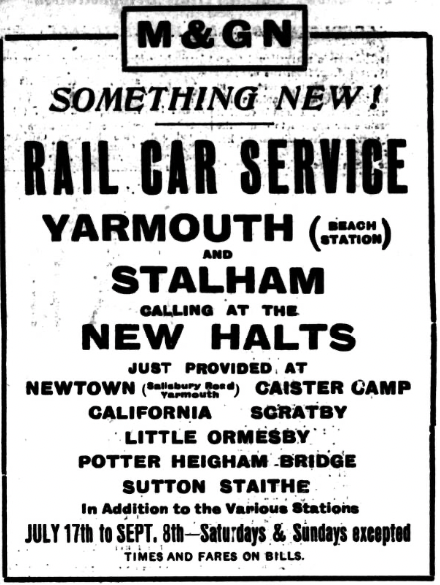
Advertisement from the Yarmouth Independent on Saturday 15 July 1933

The halt was one of seven opened by the M&GN in the summer of 1933 in an attempt to increase revenues on the line. Comprising a single wooden platform situated at ground level, Newtown Halt was located on the northern side of Salisbury Road, approximately 1/2 mile (0.80 km) north of the line's terminus at Yarmouth Beach, giving visitors access to the attractions found in the northern part of Yarmouth, as well as being convenient for Great Yarmouth High School. The area was, however, already well-served by regular bus services and by June 1958 only 25 passengers were found to be boarding trains here during the course of a week. The line crossed Salisbury Road on the level, a signal box standing on the opposite side of the crossing; the signalman was responsible for locking and unlocking the gates to the halt. Following closure in 1959, the rails were lifted but the infrastructure remained intact until the early 1960s. As at 2020 the site of the station is now a car park.

Preceding station	Disused railways	Following station
Caister-on-Sea	Midland and Great Northern; Yarmouth Line	Yarmouth Beach

== Present day ==
Although little evidence of the station remains today, the site of the halt remains unbuilt upon and can be discerned from Salisbury Road where it is used as an official car park by residents. The trackbed immediately to the north and south of the station exists as an unadopted highway.
