= Isabella Reaney =

British preacher, social activist and editor

- Born: Isabella Emily Thomasa Edis; 15 July 1847; Huntingdon, England, UK
- Died: 19 June 1929 (aged 81); Bromley, Kent, England, UK
- Other names: Isabel Edis
- Known for: writing
- Relatives: Olive Edis and Robert William Edis

Isabella Emily Thomasa "Isabel" Reaney (née Edis; 15 July 1847 – 19 June 1929) was a British preacher, social activist and editor.

== Life ==
Reaney was the daughter of Emma and Robert Edis. She was born in Huntingdon on 15 July 1847. One of her brothers was the architect Robert William Edis. Her elder brother was Arthur Wellesley Edis who was a gynaecologist and her niece through Arthur was the photographer Olive Edis.

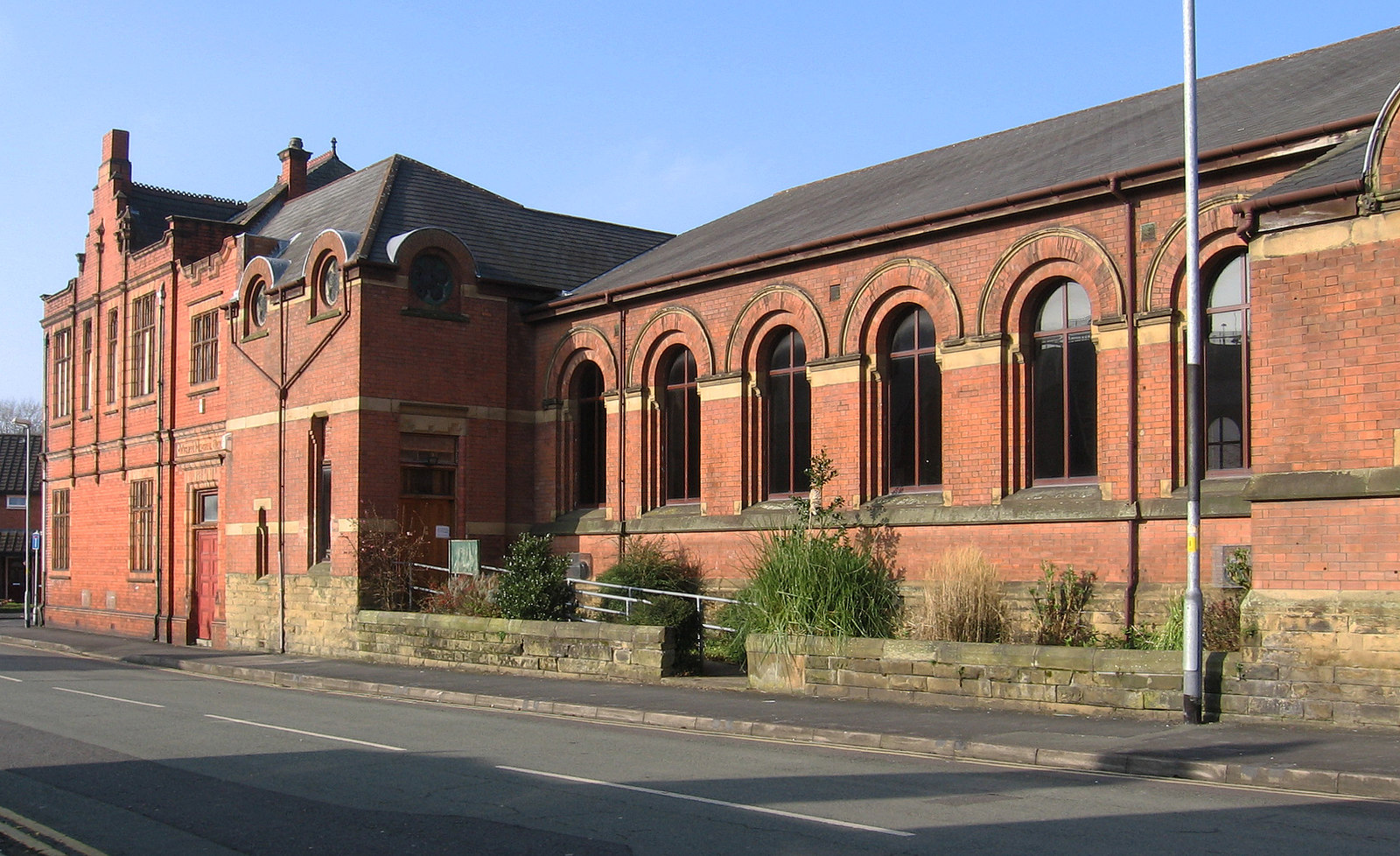
The Wycliffe Memorial Building and United Reformed Church in Warrington

Reaney seems to have led a model Christian childhood. She visited the old and poor and men and women would gather at her house on a Sunday afternoon to listen to her. She moved on use a classroom and then a local hall attracting people to listen to her. Her parents were concerned that she was overreaching herself and the local Bishop took an interest. He was said to have given his blessing to her work after hearing of her determination.

She married another preacher the Reverend George Sale Reaney, of Wycliffe Chapel in Warrington on 4 March 1873. He was a Congregational minister. Every Sunday she would preach at the local hall in Warrington. In 1876 her husband became ill and the two then spent six years in Reading before moving to Stepney where George took over the meeting house. She continued to work for the poor and she would take over her husband's preaching when he was ill.

Reaney created a home for people recovering from illness in Folkestone, and when Henrietta Barnett and her husband launched the Children's Country Holidays Fund in 1884, Reaney worked with her.

She was a campaigner for tramcar drivers in Stepney who worked long hours in poor conditions for low wages. She bought shares in tram companies so that she could attend annual general meetings to ask pointed questions. In 1885 she persuaded an MP to put a question to the Home Secretary and when she arrived at a meeting of the North Metropolitan Tramways Company in 1886 her question was convincingly voted down. The following year she campaigned to other shareholders before the meeting and the defeat was closer and the company agreed to investigate the drivers hours.

She died on 19 June 1929 at home in Bromley in Kent.

== Selected works ==
- Waking and working: or from girlhood to womanhood (1874)
- Sunbeam Willie, and other stories (1875)
- Blessing and Blessed (1878)
- Sunshine Jenny, and other stories (1878)
- Just anyone, or Kitty's dream, and other stories (1879)
- English Girls: Their Place and Power (1879)
- Rose Gurney's Discovery (1880)
- Our Brothers and Sons (1882)
- Our Daughters
- Chippings (1883)
- Unspoken Addresses (1883)
- Little Glory's Mission (1883)
- Found at Last (1883)
- Not alone in the World (1883)
