= Caister-on-Sea railway station =

Former railway station in Norfolk, England

Coordinates: 52.6476°N 1.7332°E

Caister-on-Sea
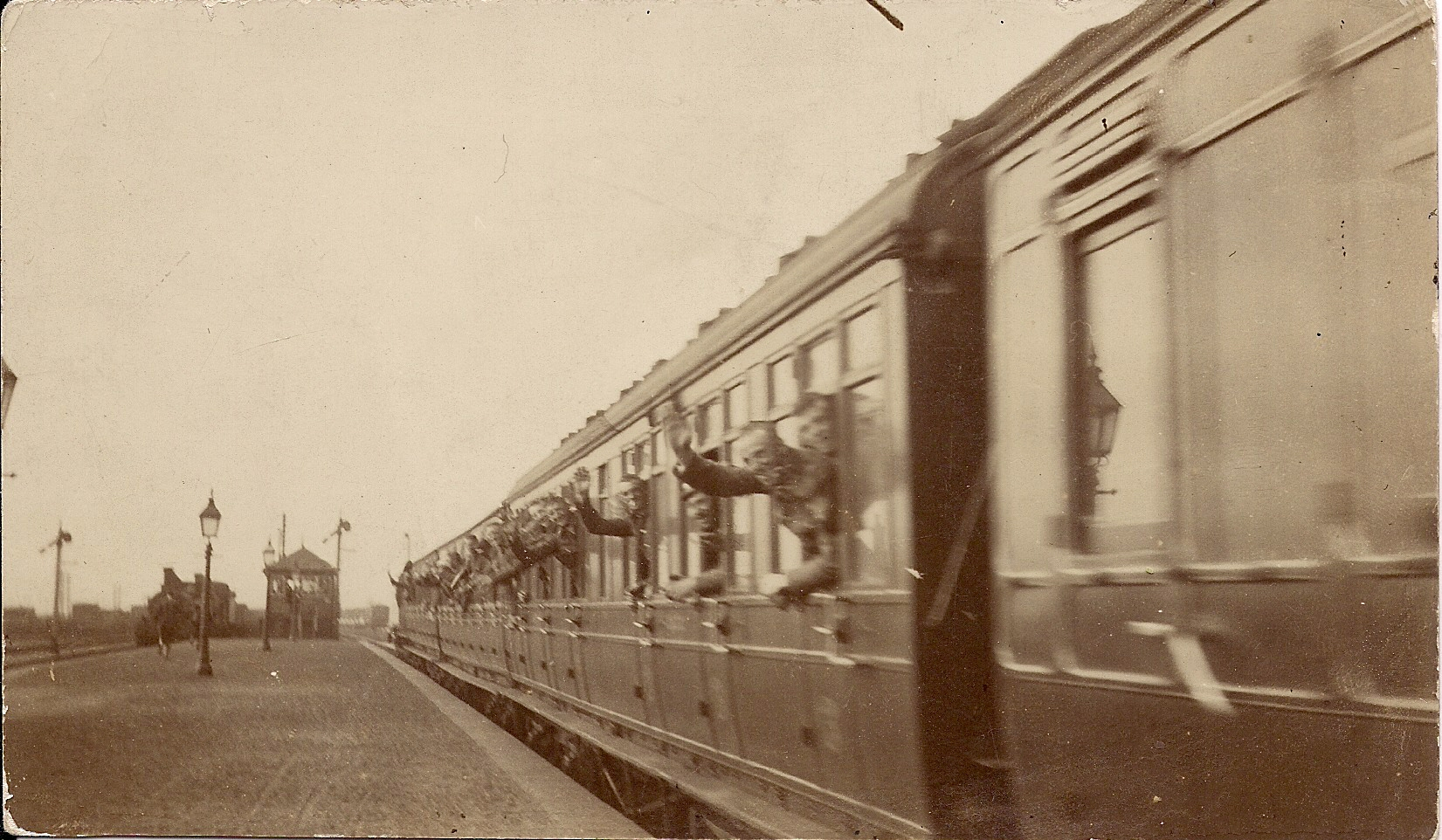

General information
- Location: Caister-on-Sea, Great Yarmouth; England
- Grid reference: TG525120
- Platforms: 1

Other information
- Status: Disused

History
- Pre-grouping: Great Yarmouth & Stalham Light Railway; Midland and Great Northern Joint Railway
- Post-grouping: Midland and Great Northern Joint Railway; Eastern Region of British Railways

Key dates
- 7 August 1877: Opened as Caister
- 1 January 1893: Renamed Caister-on-Sea
- 2 March 1959: Closed
Location

Caister-on-Sea railway station is a former railway station in Caister-on-Sea, Norfolk, England. It was opened in 1877. It later became part of the Midland and Great Northern Joint Railway route from Birmingham to Great Yarmouth, predominantly used by holidaymakers. The station was a few miles north of the terminus at Yarmouth Beach. The station closed with the rest of the line in 1959. The station was demolished following closure and the site is now occupied by housing.

Former Services

Preceding station	Disused railways	Following station
Caister Camp Halt	Midland and Great Northern; Yarmouth Line	Newtown Halt
