= Great Ormesby railway station =

Former railway station in Norfolk, England

Coordinates: 52.6741°N 1.6977°E

Great Ormesby
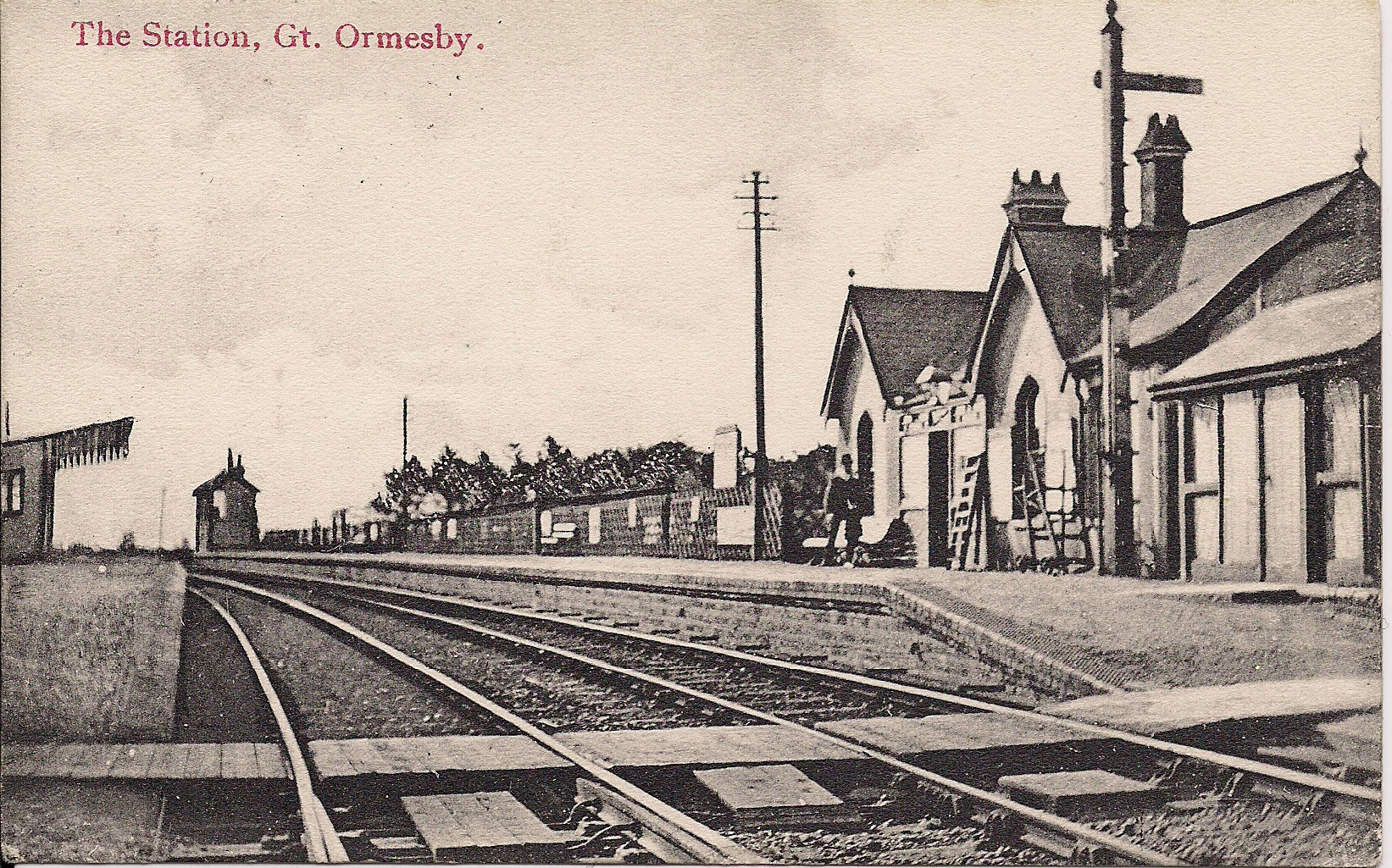

General information
- Location: Ormesby St Margaret, Great Yarmouth; England
- Grid reference: TG500148
- Platforms: 2

Other information
- Status: Disused

History
- Pre-grouping: Great Yarmouth & Stalham Light Railway; Midland and Great Northern Joint Railway
- Post-grouping: Midland and Great Northern Joint Railway; Eastern Region of British Railways

Key dates
- 7 August 1877: Opened (Ormesby)
- 24 January 1884: Renamed (Great Ormesby)
- 2 March 1959: Closed
Location

Great Ormesby railway station was a station in Ormesby St Margaret, Norfolk, England. It was opened in 1877 and later became part of the Midland and Great Northern Joint Railway route bringing holiday passengers from the Midlands to the Norfolk coastal resorts. It was closed in 1959 along with the rest of the line.

== Little Ormesby Halt ==
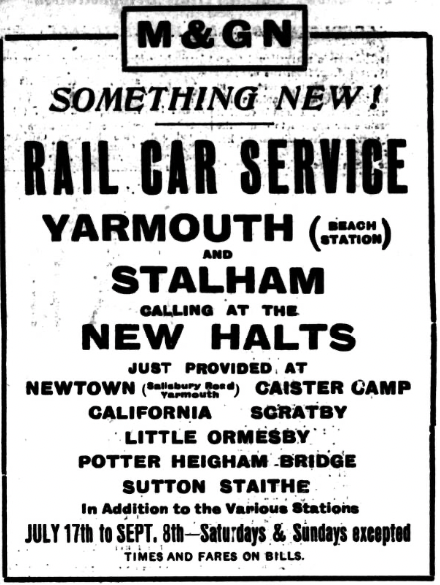
Advertisement from the Yarmouth Independent on Saturday 15 July 1933

A halt at Little Ormesby opened in July 1933, the same time as Scratby and California Halts, to serve the local holiday industry. Little Ormesby was not well patronised and closed after a single season.

Preceding station	Disused railways	Following station
Hemsby	Midland and Great Northern; Yarmouth Line	Scratby Halt
