= Scratby Halt railway station =

Former railway station in Norfolk, England

Coordinates: 52.6730°N 1.7103°E

Scratby Halt

General information
- Location: Scratby, Great Yarmouth; England
- Grid reference: TG509147
- Platforms: 1

Other information
- Status: Disused

History
- Post-grouping: Midland and Great Northern Joint Railway; Eastern Region of British Railways

Key dates
- 17 July 1933: Opened
- September 1939: Closed
- June 1948: Reopened
- 27 September 1958: Last day of services
- 2 March 1959: Official closure
Location

Scratby Halt was a railway station on the Midland and Great Northern Joint Railway which served the Norfolk village of Scratby, England.

== History ==
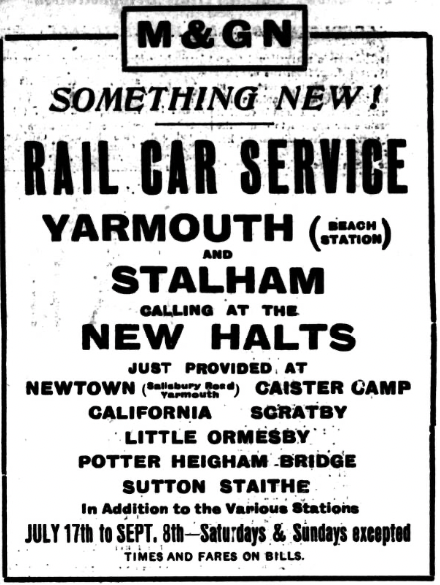
Advertisement from the Yarmouth Independent on Saturday 15 July 1933

In 1933 the Midland and Great Northern Joint Railway introduced a small railcar “Tantivy” to enhance the summer service on the line between Yarmouth and Stalham. This allowed the introduction of seven new halts, which saved people walking a mile or more to the nearest station. The new halts were for Newtown, Caister Holiday Camp, California, Scratby, Little Ormesby, Potter Heigham Bridge and Sutton Staithe. Each of these was a request stop.

The station was closed as a wartime measure before passing briefly to the Eastern Region of British Railways on nationalisation in 1948 only to be closed by British Railways in 1959.

| Preceding station | Disused railways | Following station |
|---|---|---|
| Great Ormesby | Midland and Great Northern; Yarmouth Line | California Halt |
