= Merched y Wawr =

Welsh-language women's organisation

- Merched y Wawr
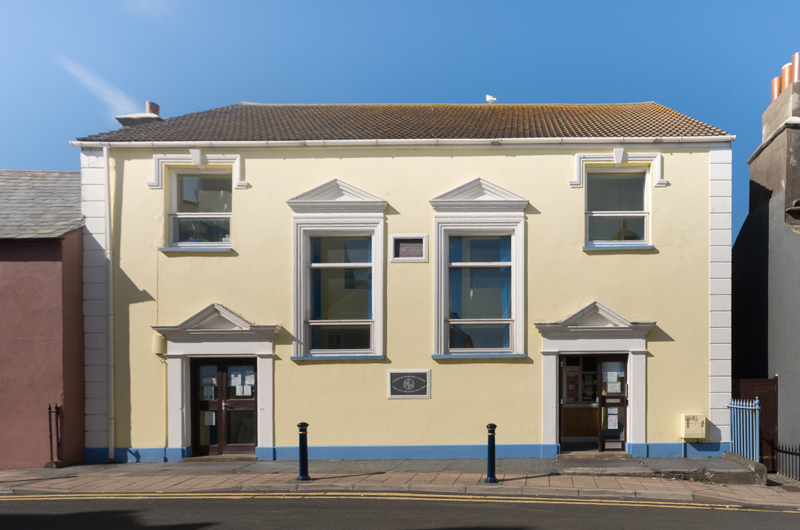
- The headquarters of Merched y Wawr, in Aberystwyth.
- Formation: 1967; 59 years ago
- Founder: Zonia Bowen
- Founded at: Y Parc
- Headquarters: Aberystwyth
- Coordinates: 52.4132°N 4.0874°W
- Region served: Wales
- Official language: Welsh
- Honorary President: Sylwen Lloyd Davies
- National President: Meirwen Lloyd
- Publication: Y Wawr
- Website: merchedywawr.cymru (in Welsh)

Merched y Wawr (Welsh for 'Daughters of the Dawn') is a voluntary, non-political, organisation for women in Wales. It is similar to the Women's Institute (WI) but its activities are conducted through the medium of Welsh. Its aims are to promote women's issues and to support culture, education and the arts in Wales.

== History ==
Merched y Wawr was established in 1967 when the WI insisted on English, one of the two main languages of Wales, as the official language of the movement. There had been an historic use of Welsh in the WI, and with over two hundred and fifty branches in Wales this decision was unpopular. The WI branch in the village of Parc, Llanycil broke away from the movement and began Merched y Wawr, which would operate solely in Welsh. The movement grew quickly and in the late 1980s the organisation had over 10,000 members and more than 275 branches.

In 1968, Merched y Wawr launched a quarterly magazine, Y Wawr (The Dawn), and embraced an anthem, Fy Iaith, Fy Ngwlad (My Language, My Land), composed by David Jacob Davies and Elfed Owen. In 1975, the organisation's founder, Zonia Bowen, an atheist, left the organisation when Merched y Wawr began to embrace Christianity, contrary to the movement's non-denominational origins.

Merched y Wawr has been involved in campaigning efforts ranging from support for the creation of a memorial to Gwenllian ferch Llywelyn to collecting oral history across Wales. Local branches typically meet once a month. The headquarters are in Aberystwyth; the hall there is a community resource, used by other charities and organisations in the area. In 2016 it had around 7,000 members, in over 270 branches.
