= John Clere (naval commander) =

English politician

Sir John Clere (1511? – 13 August 1557) was an English politician and naval commander.

== Career ==
He was eldest surviving son of Sir Robert Clere of Ormesby, Norfolk, and his second wife Alice, daughter of Sir William Boleyn, of Blickling Hall, Norfolk. He succeeded to his father's estates in 1529 and in 1538 came into possession of about 20 manors, mostly on the Norfolk coast, following his mother's death.

His mother left him "a bed of blue damask and yellow", a "heart of gold with a large diamond in it", and "a pair of beads of gold" (a rosary). She bequeathed to his brother, the poet Thomas Clere a gold table salt and a pair of beads which had been a gift from Anne Boleyn.

Clere married, by 1531, Anne, daughter of Sir Thomas Tyrrell of Gipping, Suffolk (and a granddaughter of James Tyrrell), with whom he had three sons and two daughters. Clere was knighted in 1539, and was an attendant of the Duke of Norfolk at the reception of Anne of Cleves.

He was a Member of Parliament (MP) for Bramber 1542 and 1545, Thetford March 1553 and Norfolk 1555.

Queen Mary I raised loans for defence and war in Scotland. Clere was one of the Norfolk landowners who contributed £100 in 1557.

== Naval service ==
He served in the Royal Navy as captain of the ships Peter Longanarde or Peter Pomegranate (1545) and Swepestake (1546). He served in France as treasurer of the English army stationed there from November 1549 to April 1550. In 1556 he was appointed Vice-Admiral at Portsmouth. His first mission was to escort the abdicated Emperor Charles V to retirement in Spain, receiving a golden chain from him.

=== Defeat at Kirkwall ===
His second assignment was to command with Admiral William Woodhouse a naval expedition against Scotland.

Clere's fleet in July included; the Minion, the Trinity Henry, the Salamander, the Mary Willoughby, the Greyhound, the Bull, the Tiger, the New Bark, and the Flower de Luce.

He was drowned in August 1557 in battle with a Scots fleet in the Orkney Islands. According to the report of John Southerne, captain of the Gabriel, Clere burnt Kirkwall town on 11 August and on next day entered the Cathedral and brought six cannon on shore to batter the castle. On Friday 13 the force on shore attempting to take the Bishop's Palace was beaten back to sea by 3000 islanders, and 97 men including Clere were drowned. The defending forces were led by Edward Sinclair of Strom.

== Family ==
His children included:

- Robert Clere (died 1547), killed at the battle of Pinkie
- Thomas Clere, who died at Florence
- Edward Clere, who became an MP.
- Elizabeth Clere, who married (1) Walter Hevenden of Maidstone, (2) Francis Trevor
- Margaret Clere (died 1566), who married Walter Haddon
