= Alice Clere =

Alice, Lady Clere (née Boleyn) (died 1538) was the third daughter of Sir William Boleyn and his wife Margaret Ormond (otherwise Butler), the daughter and co-heiress of Thomas Butler, 7th Earl of Ormond. Alice was thus the sister of Thomas Boleyn, 1st Earl of Wiltshire, and the aunt of King Henry VIII's second Queen, Anne Boleyn.

== Life ==
Alice married, as her second husband, Sir Robert Clere (c. 1453 – 10 August 1529) of Ormesby St. Margaret, Norfolk, the son and heir of Robert Clere and his wife Elizabeth, the daughter and heiress of Thomas Uvedale.

In 1520, she was at the Field of the Cloth of Gold, a knight's wife listed as "Lady Clere".

In 1533, Alice and her sister, Anne Shelton, were placed in charge of the household of the King's daughter, Princess Mary. Alice was also a senior member of Princess Elizabeth's household while she was living at Hatfield Palace in Hertfordshire. It has been supposed that Alice Clere was the kinder of the two guardians appointed to Mary. Anne Shelton is believed to have been harsher.

Alice died on 1 November 1538, leaving a will dated 28 October 1538 which was proved 23 January 1539. Both she and her husband were buried at Ormesby St. Margaret. Her monument was a slab in the chancel with a brass depicting her holding a heart in her hands.

== Will ==
Alice Clere left the family estates to her older son John Clere. She bequeathed him "a bed of blue damask and yellow", a "heart of gold with a large diamond in it", and "a pair of beads of gold" (a rosary). Alice Clere left her younger son Thomas Clere "a salt of gold with a cover having a rose in the knop, and a pair of beads of gold" set with stones which had been gifts from Anne Boleyn. To her niece Knyvett she left a "tablet of gold with the Salutation of Our Lady in it" with 8 rubies and 24 pearls, and she left an emerald ring to her niece Elizabeth Shelton.

== Issue ==
- John Clere (c. 1511 – 21 August 1557) of Ormesby St Margaret and Norwich, married Anne Tyrrell, the daughter of Sir Thomas Tyrrell of Gipping, Suffolk
- Richard Clere.
- Thomas Clere (died 1545).
