= Zonia Bowen =

British writer and linguist (1926–2024)

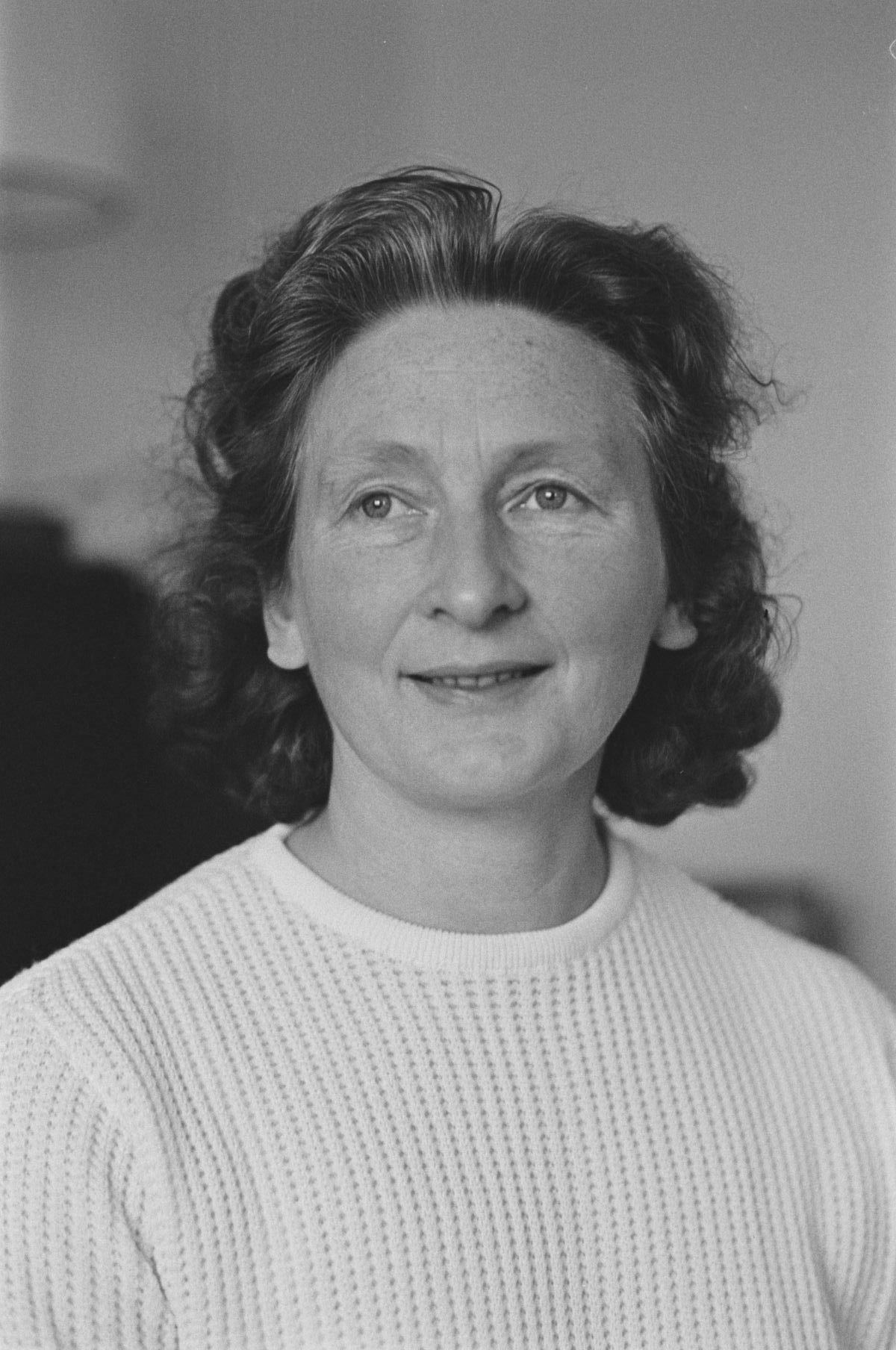
- Born: 23 April 1926; Ormesby St Margaret, Norfolk, England
- Died: 18 March 2024 (aged 97)
- Education: Bangor University
- Writing career
- Notable work: Y Wawr magazine

Zonia Margarita Bowen (née North; 23 April 1926 – 18 March 2024) was an English-born writer, linguist, and activist in Wales. The founder of the women's organisation Merched y Wawr, Bowen worked to promote the Welsh language and Welsh culture.

== Early life and education ==
Zonia Margarita North was born in Ormesby St Margaret, Norfolk, England, in 1926. She grew up in Heckmondwike, Yorkshire.

She studied French at Bangor University in Wales during the 1940s. While there, she began to learn Welsh for the first time, to connect with friends and neighbours. Despite her own English background, she became passionate about the Welsh language and Welsh identity.

In 1947, she married the Welsh poet Geraint Bowen. They had four children; several of her grandchildren are members of the bands Plu and Y Bandana.

== Activism ==
In 1967, Zonia Bowen founded Merched y Wawr in response to officials not allowing the local Women's Institute branch, near Bala, to operate in the Welsh language. The new women's organisation grew to a national one that continues to this day.

Bowen served as the organisation's first national secretary, and as the founding editor of its Y Wawr magazine, which she ran for six years. During her time with the group, she organised several international trips for its members, including to the Soviet Union in 1975.

She resigned as honorary president in 1976, severing ties with Merched y Wawr, because she had envisioned it as a secular, nondenominational organisation open to everyone, but others wanted to incorporate Christianity into its activities.

As a child, Bowen had been raised without religion. She was involved with the Wales Humanists, including as onetime secretary of the organisation's council, though she did not explicitly label herself as a humanist, preferring "freethinker" or no label at all.

Bowen was also prominently involved in the Madryn campaign, which opposed the dumping of nuclear waste in Wales.

== Writing ==
In addition to French and Welsh, Bowen also studied Breton, and she went on to publish the first Welsh-language Breton textbook. She also published a Welsh-language book for children about humanism. In 1991, she co-wrote a seminal history of the Gorsedd of Bards with her husband.

She published an autobiography, Dy bobl di fydd fy mhobl i, in 2015.

== Death ==
Zonia Bowen died in 2024 at the age of 97.
