= Scratby =

Seaside resort in Norfolk, England

Coordinates: 52.680664°N 1.712399°E

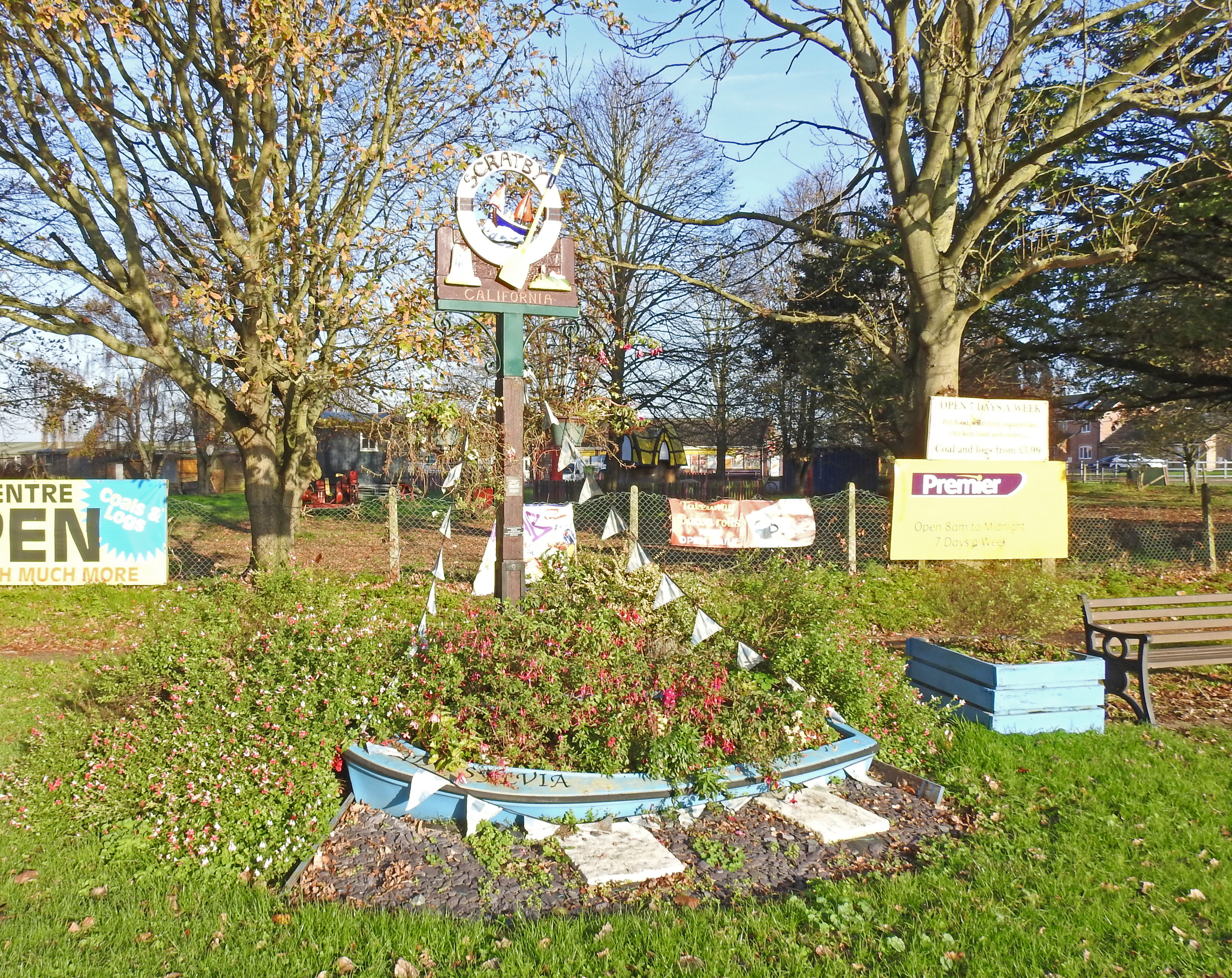
- Scratby Village Sign

- Location within Norfolk
- OS grid reference: TG510156
- Civil parish: Ormesby St Margaret with Scratby
- District: Great Yarmouth
- Shire county: Norfolk
- Region: East
- Country: England
- Sovereign state: United Kingdom
- Post town: GREAT YARMOUTH
- Postcode district: NR29
- Dialling code: 01493
- Police: Norfolk
- Fire: Norfolk
- Ambulance: East of England
- UK Parliament: Great Yarmouth

Scratby is a seaside village within the parish of Ormesby St Margaret with Scratby in the Borough of Great Yarmouth in Norfolk, England. Scratby is situated 7 miles (11 km) north of Great Yarmouth. The village forms part of the wider Great Yarmouth Urban Area. The village is adjacent to the small village of California to the south and the village of Hemsby to the north.

== History ==
Scratby was first recorded in the Domesday Book as "in the hundred of East Flegg and the county of Norfolk."

In 1870-72, John Marius Wilson's Imperial Gazetteer of England and Wales described the village as follows:

SCRATBY, a parish in Flegg district, Norfolk; on the coast, 5¼ miles N by W of Yarmouth r. station. Post-town, Ormsby, under Great Yarmouth. Acres, returned with Ormsby. Real property, £1, 505. Pop. in 1851, 177; in 1861, 309. Houses, 65. S. Hall was formerly the seat of the Earl of Home, and is now the seat of the Rev. R. Foster. A fishing village was recently formed at the cliff California. A life-boat station also was recently formed. The living is a vicarage, annexed to Ormsby, in the diocese of Norwich.

— John Marius Wilson, Imperial Gazetteer of England and Wales, https://www.visionofbritain.org.uk/place/23439

The village grew in size in 1848, due to the discovery of 16th century gold coins in nearby California. As a result, the-then small village grew in popularity as a seaside resort alongside Scratby.

== Geography ==
Scratby is adjacent to the small built-up area of California to the south and is close to the villages of Hemsby to the north and Ormesby St Margaret to the southwest. The North Sea is to the east.

== All Saints Parish Hall and Old Methodist Church ==
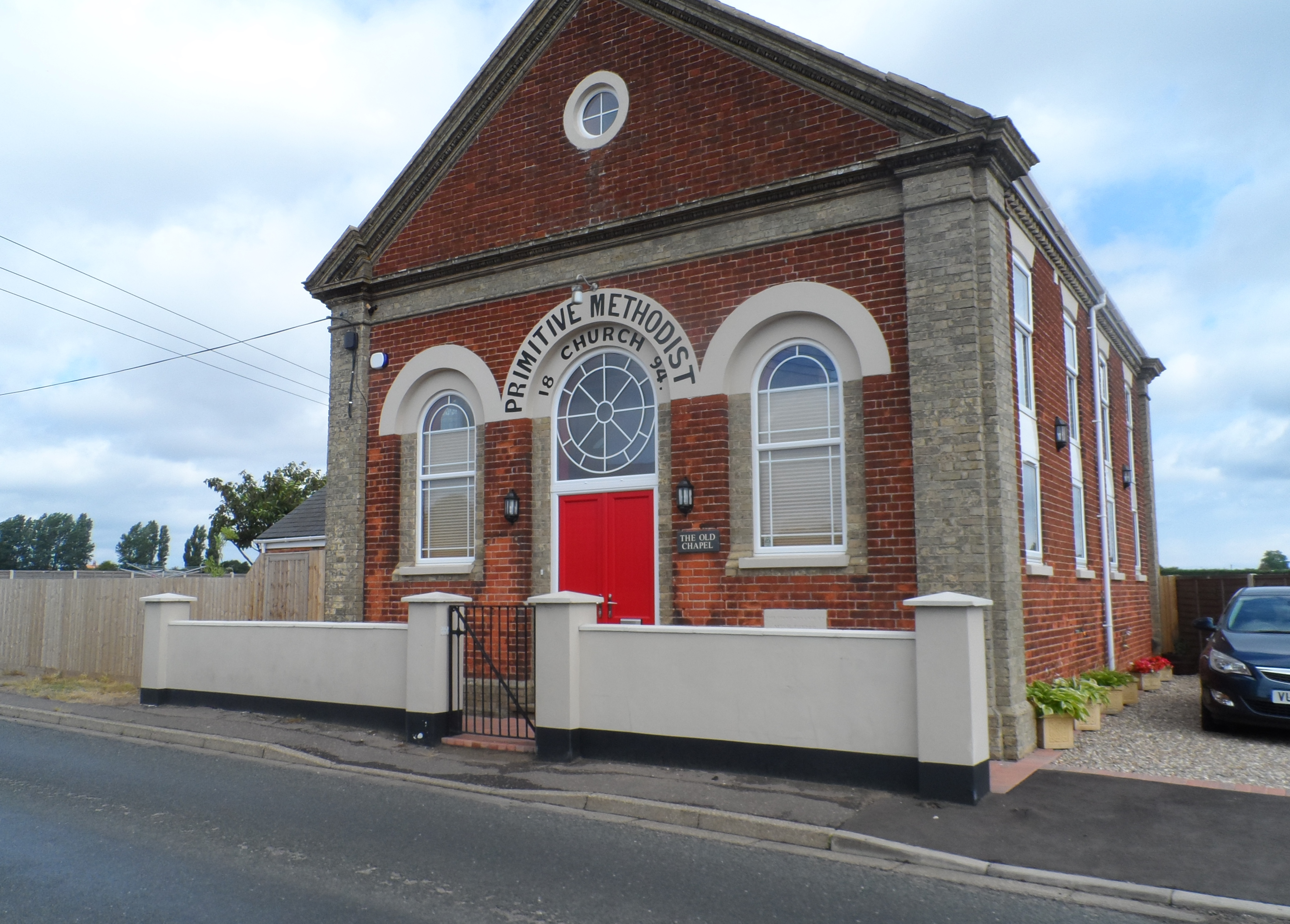
The former Methodist church, opened in 1894, closed in 2012 and now a private residence.

The village is served by All Saints Parish Hall off Beach Road. An old church is believed to have once occupied the site. The hall is used for community events.

There was also a Primitive Methodist chapel on Scratby Road. It was opened in 1894 and continued to be used until 2012 when it was closed. It has since been converted to a private residence.

== Scratby Hall ==
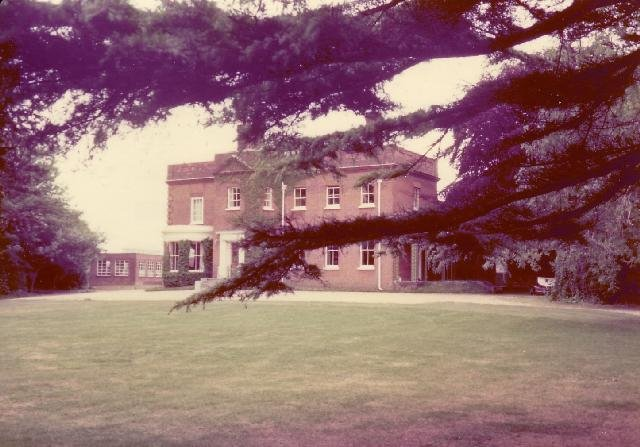
Scratby Hall

Scratby Hall was built by John Fisher in about 1750, possibly incorporating elements from an earlier building. It was acquired by John Ramey, a lawyer and mayor of Great Yarmouth, who moved into the property on his retirement, having previously leased it to the diarist Sylas Neville. Ramey's daughter Abigail lived in the house following the death in 1786 of her husband, Reverend Alexander Home, 9th Earl of Home. The house underwent substantial additions during the 19th century. From 1949 to the mid-1980s, the home and estate served as Duncan Hall School. After the closure of the school, the Hall became a private residence. It was damaged by a fire in 1989.

== Transport ==
=== Buses ===
Scratby is served by the "Coastal Clipper" bus service running from Martham to Great Yarmouth and on to Lowestoft via Hemsby, Caister-on-Sea, Gorleston-on-Sea, James Paget Hospital, Hopton-on-Sea and Corton. The route is operated by First Eastern Counties. Additional bus services from the village include: Hemsby-Great Yarmouth, Caister-Great Yarmouth-James Paget Hospital and Bradwell-Caister.

=== Railway ===
The village was once served by a railway halt on the Midland and Great Northern Joint Railway between Yarmouth Beach and Melton Constable. Scratby Halt railway station was opened on the 17 July 1933 and was closed in September 1939. It reopened in June 1948 and closed permanently on the 27 September 1958.
