= California, Norfolk =

Seaside resort in Norfolk, England

Coordinates: 52.672°N 1.721°E

California
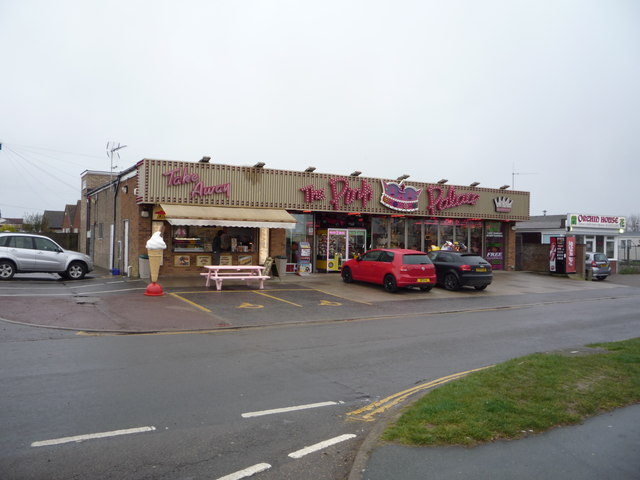
- Rottenstone Road, California

- Location within Norfolk
- OS grid reference: TG514149
- Civil parish: Ormesby St Margaret with Scratby
- District: Great Yarmouth
- Shire county: Norfolk
- Region: East
- Country: England
- Sovereign state: United Kingdom
- Post town: GREAT YARMOUTH
- Postcode district: NR29
- Dialling code: 01493
- Police: Norfolk
- Fire: Norfolk
- Ambulance: East of England
- UK Parliament: Great Yarmouth

California is a seaside village in the parish of Ormesby St Margaret with Scratby in the Borough of Great Yarmouth in Norfolk, England. It is 6 miles (9.7 km) north of Great Yarmouth and forms part of the wider Great Yarmouth Urban Area. The village is adjacent to the village of Scratby to the north and 1 mile (1.6 km) north of Caister-on-Sea. It is on the North Sea coast.

== History ==
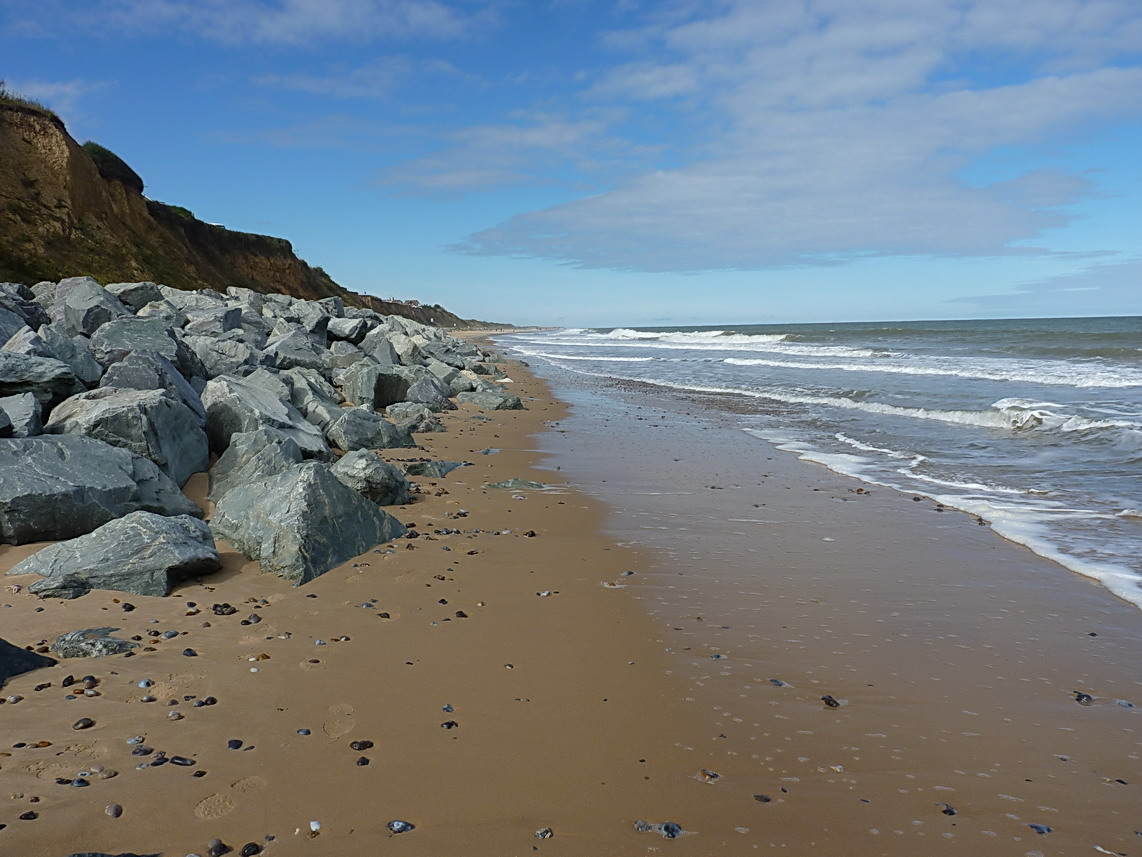
California Beach, where gold coins were discovered in 1848.

California acquired its name when a number of 16th century gold coins were discovered on the beach in 1848 at a time when the California Gold Rush was in the news.

== Amenities ==
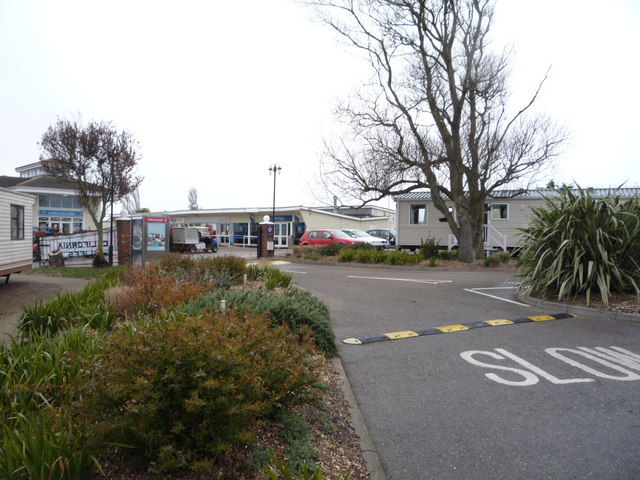
California Cliffs Holiday Park

California has a wide, sand and shingle beach and several caravan parks. There is also a tearoom and a pub.

== Transport ==
California is served by the "Coastal Clipper" bus service running from Martham to Great Yarmouth and Lowestoft, which is operated by First Eastern Counties. Additional bus services from the village link it to Hemsby, Caister, and Bradwell.

The village was once served by a railway halt on the Midland and Great Northern Joint Railway between Yarmouth Beach and Melton Constable. California Halt railway station was opened on the 17 July 1933 and was closed in September 1939. It reopened in June 1948 and closed permanently on the 27 September 1958 with the line fully closing on the 2 March 1959. The halt has since been demolished and is now occupied by California Road and a house is now on the site of the former halt site.
