= Norwich Puppet Man =

British street entertainer (born 1942)

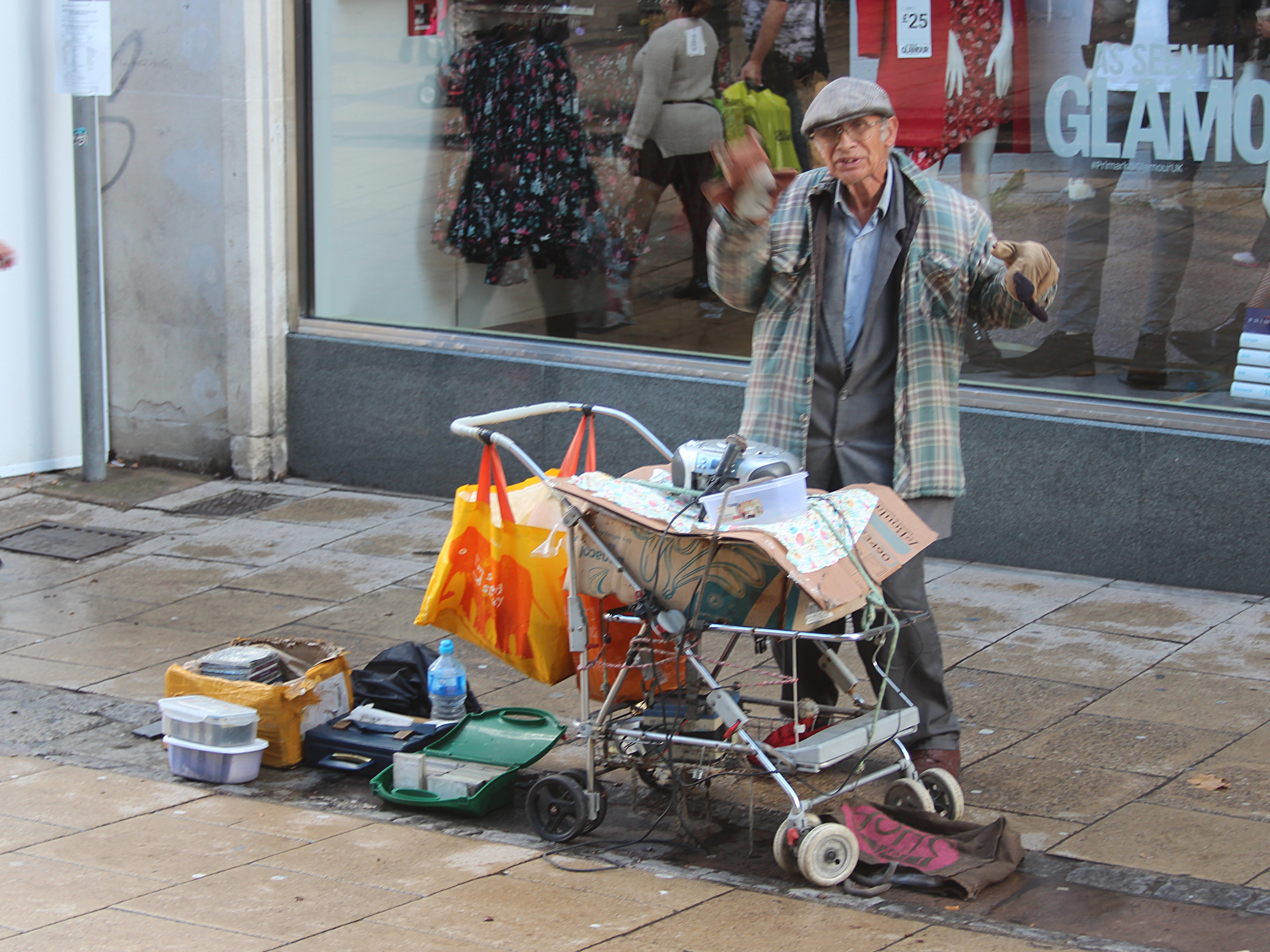
Perry performing in Norwich in 2017

David John Perry (born 9 April 1942), commonly known as the Puppet Man, is a street entertainer from Norfolk, United Kingdom. He now resides in Great Yarmouth, his performance consists of dancing with a range of puppets while singing along to pop songs played on a portable karaoke machine.

== Style ==
Using a karaoke machine, the puppets dance while Perry sings his own interpretations over songs by Elvis Presley and The Beatles. He first started performing as the Norwich Puppet Man in the mid-1990s, but in 1997 was forced to quit when his incapacity benefit was stopped because he was earning money through busking. He returned to busking on Gentleman's Walk in late 2005 or early 2006, by which time internet sites had begun to spread his fame. He does not hold, nor does he require a buskers licence to busk in either Norwich or Great Yarmouth.

He usually performs in pedestrian zones located in the city centre of Norwich and town centre of Great Yarmouth, typically two or three times a week and mainly in the afternoons and on weekends. In Norwich, the Puppet Man can mostly be found on Gentleman's Walk off St Peter Mancroft and the old Haymarket around the bottom of Hay Hill. In Great Yarmouth he is usually found on Regent Road, close to the entrance to the Market Gates Shopping Centre.

Over the years, Perry's eccentric style of "dancing in the city centre behind his ghetto blaster and waving his puppets in time to an eclectic range of music" has made the Puppet Man a cult figure in Norwich and Great Yarmouth. In a competition organised by the Castle Quarter Shopping Centre in June 2007 titled “The faces that sum up why Norwich is such a fine city”, he was named as one of the “25 Faces of Norwich”.

In summer 2008, Perry was hired by a nightclub in Norwich to perform some live action in front of 2,000 people for a student based event. In August 2008, Perry publicly announced that he was going to stop busking in Norwich and move to Great Yarmouth, but has since continued to appear in Norwich on a regular basis.

== Puppets ==
The puppets David Perry has used since appearing as the Norwich Puppet Man include Dougal the purple dog, Roy Waller the snake, Billy McDog (a canine hand puppet), Big Tom the duck, Mick the dog and Brenda (named after Perry's wife)

A fox and squirrel puppet were donated in June 2007 by the owners of Langley's, a toy shop located in Royal Arcade on Gentleman's Walk. Commenting on the puppets, Perry said about the gifts: "Some people don't like my singing. I was pleased to get the new puppets. I've named the fox Basil and the squirrel is his girlfriend Suzy. Basil likes to dance to the Beatles and Suzy sometimes makes an appearance. Basil was a relation to Basil Brush and now he's been made to work on the street he's not happy about it."

== Public perception ==
Over the years, the Norwich Puppet Man has built up a cult following. He has appeared in a series of postcards of Norfolk, claiming to capture unappreciated parts of the county. A group set up in his honour on the social network website Facebook gained more than 4,000 members, and tens of thousands of viewers have watched clips of him that were posted on the video website YouTube.

While Perry's peculiar brand of entertainment has undoubtedly made him locally famous, the quality of the Puppet Man's performances remains controversial. Some describe him as a "legend" and a "great favourite with many shoppers in Gentleman's Walk", others find him to be "a noisy obstruction totally bereft of any skill or creativity". When Perry was named one of the “25 Faces of Norwich”, a local shop manager said about the Puppet Man that he "adds fun to the streets of Norwich, he puts a smile on hundreds of people's faces every day".

In September 2010, an unhappy shop owner poured water over Perry's CD player, later apologising and replacing the equipment. In January 2015, the announcement of Radio 1's Big Weekend in Norwich, Perry was featured as a cult figure in the city on the BBC Newsbeat website.
