= Puppet man =

Puppet man may refer to:

- "Puppet Man", a song by Neil Sedaka and later covered by others
- Norwich Puppet Man, nickname used for the street entertainer David John Perry
