= Reg Edwards =

Reg or Reginald Edwards may refer to:

- Reg Edwards (rugby union) (1887–1951), English rugby union player
- Reg Edwards (footballer, born 1912) (1912–?), English footballer who played in the Football League for Burnley and Walsall
- Reg Edwards (footballer, born 1953), English footballer who played in the Football League for Port Vale
- Reg Edwards (Australian footballer) (born 1943), Australian rules footballer
- Reginald Edwards (cricketer) (1881–1925), English cricketer
