= Scot and lot =

Medieval set of local rights and obligations in British countries

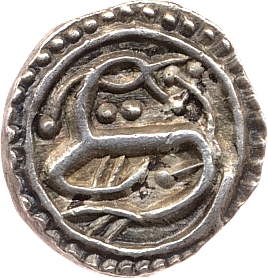
A sceat

Scot and lot is a phrase common in the records of English, Welsh and Irish medieval boroughs, referring to local rights and obligations.

The term scot comes from the Old English word sceat, an ordinary coin in Anglo-Saxon times, equivalent to the later penny. In Anglo-Saxon times, a payment was levied locally to cover the cost of establishing drainage and embankments of low-lying land, and observing them to ensure they remained secure. This payment was typically a sceat, so the levy itself gradually came to be called sceat. In burghs, sceat was levied to cover maintenance of the town walls and defences.

In Norman times, under the influence of the word escot, in Old French, the vowel changed, and the term became scot. In 19th century Kent and Sussex, low-lying farmland was still being called scot-land. Scot, though, gradually became a general term for local levies; a person who was not liable for the levy, but received its benefits, got off 'scot-free'.

Lot means portion/share, hence lottery, land lot and allotment. The phrase scot and lot thus meant the local levies someone paid, and the share they received of local provisions; more generally, it meant rights and obligations, in respect of local government.

In the medieval Lordship of Ireland, Frenchmen were required to pay scot and lot. Scot and lot is also mentioned in a statute of the city of Waterford: no man could enjoy the liberties of the city unless he was resident there, and paid scot and lot.

Parliament had evolved from the king's baronial court, with the Commons being populated by representatives of the landholders who were too minor to call in person. Burghs were somewhat outside the feudal system, making their franchise ambiguous. Before the mid 19th century, burghs varied in their choice of franchise. In some burghs, the franchise was set at scot and lot; that is, people were only permitted to vote if they were liable for the local levies.

In mediaeval times, this could mean dozens of people, and by the 19th century tens of thousands of people could qualify in a single scot and lot burgh. In Gatton, however, only two people qualified under scot and lot; since burghs received two MPs, this meant that each MP for Gatton represented exactly one voter. The quirks of the existing system, such as Gatton, was one of the reasons for the Reform Act 1832. There were two scot and lot boroughs in Wales: Flint Boroughs (1727–1832) and Haverfordwest.

A cognate term, skat, exists in the udal law of Orkney and Shetland.

== Sources ==
- Danby Palmer Fry, 'On the Phrase Scot and Lot', in Trans. Philological Society (1867), pp. 167–197;
- C. Gross, Gild Merchant, i. c. iv.
- Pollock and Maitland, Hist. Eng. Law, p. 647.
