= Danby Palmer Fry =

Danby Palmer Fry (1 December 1818 – 16 February 1903) was an English official and barrister, known as a legal writer.

== Life ==
Born in Great Ormond Street, London, on 1 December 1818, he was second son in the family of four sons and four daughters of Alfred Augustus Fry, an accountant and for some years a partner in Thomas de la Rue & Co.; his mother was Jane Sarah Susannah Westcott. He was named after his father's friend, Danby Palmer of Norwich (father of Charles John Palmer). The eldest son, Alfred Augustus Fry, was the first English barrister to practise in Constantinople.

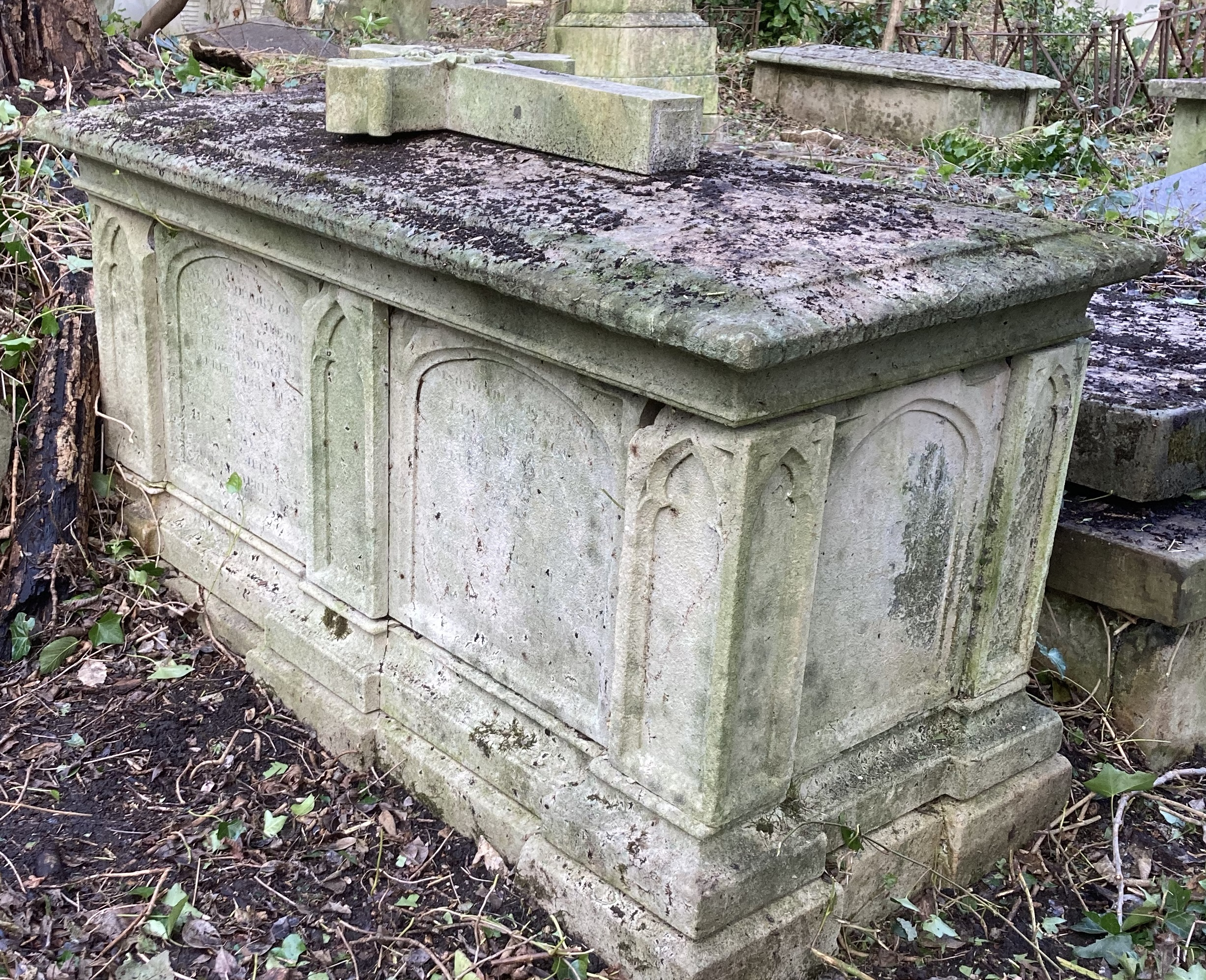
Grave of Danby Palmer Fry in Highgate Cemetery

Fry was educated at Hunter Street Academy, Brunswick Square, London, a grammar school conducted by Jonathan Dawson, whose sons George and Benjamin were Fry's schoolfellows. In 1836 he became a clerk in the Poor Law Board, first at Somerset House and then at Gwydyr House in Whitehall. On 1 April 1848, during the Chartist riots, he reported hourly via messengers on the agitators on Kennington Common.

Called to the bar at Lincoln's Inn on 30 January 1851, Fry became in October 1871 inspector of audits, and on 15 October 1873 assistant secretary to the Local Government Board. From 1878 until his retirement in 1882 he was legal adviser to the Board.

Fry was an original member of the Philological Society, founded in 1842, and its treasurer for many years; he was also one of the original committee of the Early English Text Society, founded in 1864. He died unmarried, on 16 February 1903, at his home 166 Haverstock Hill, and was buried on the western side of Highgate cemetery (grave no.4451).

== Works ==
Fry's legal handbooks were:

- Local Taxes of the United Kingdom (1846, published officially);
- Union Assessment Committee Act (1862; 8th edit. 1897);
- Lunacy Acts (1864; 3rd edit. 1890);
- The Law Relating to Vaccination (1869; 7th edit. 1890); and
- The Valuation [Metropolis] Act (1869; 2nd edit. 1872)

Some became standard works. He wrote also The Boarding Out of Pauper Children (1871).

Fry contributed papers on linguistic subjects to the Transactions of the Philological Society; and was joint author with Benjamin Dawson of a short book On the Genders of French Substantives (1876).

== Notes ==
Attribution

This article incorporates text from a publication now in the public domain: Lee, Sidney, ed. (1912). "Fry, Danby Palmer". Dictionary of National Biography (2nd supplement). Vol. 2. London: Smith, Elder & Co.
