= Travis Kerschen =

British actor (born 1982)

Travis Kerschen (born 3 November 1982, Great Yarmouth, Norfolk) is an independent film actor.

== Filmography ==
- Benoît Brisefer: Les taxis rouges (actor)
- Brèves de comptoir (actor)
- The Red Scare (actor)
- La Belle et la Bête (actor)
- Saint Laurent (actor)
- Saint Loin la mauderne (actor)
- Hippocrate (actor)
- Aimer, boire et chanter (actor)
- L'écume des jours (English title: Mood Indigo) (actor)
- Untitled Harrison Atkins film (actor)
- All One Moment (actor)
- Hellstorm (actor)
- Paradox Hill (actor)
- A Time to Prey (actor)
- Rain Curtain (actor)
- A Day in the Life (actor)
- Tantrika (director)
- IKO (film) (director)
- Il Sangue dell'impero (producer)
- On the Run (producer)
- Best Actress (editor)
- Hugo de Mexico (director)
- Luz (director)
- Black Dollar (director)
