= Charles John Palmer =

English lawyer and historian

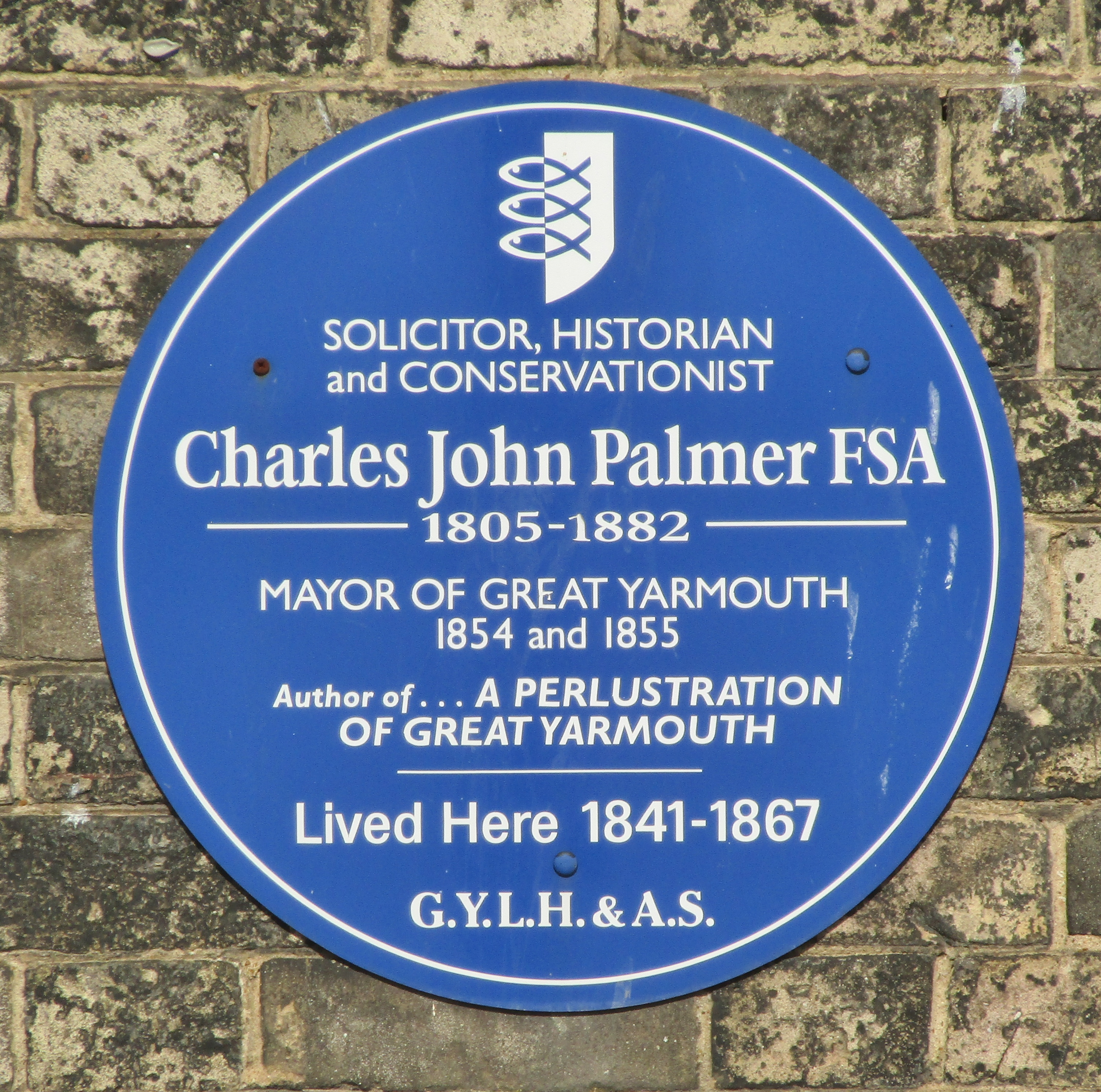

Charles John Palmer, FSA (1 January 1805 – 1882) was an English lawyer, known as a historian of Great Yarmouth.

== Biography ==
He was the only son of John Danby Palmer, by Anne, daughter of Charles Beart, of Gorleston, Suffolk, and was born at Yarmouth on 1 January 1805. He was educated at a private school run by Mr. Bowles in Queen Street, Great Yarmouth, and in 1822 was articled to Robert Cory, F.S.A., an attorney, under whom he had previously served for two years, in order to qualify himself to become a notary public. He was admitted an attorney in June 1827, and practised at Yarmouth until his retirement.

For many years he resided at No. 4 South Quay, in an Elizabethan house which his father had purchased in 1809. He became an alderman of the old corporation, and in August 1835 was elected mayor; but the passing of the Municipal Corporations Act 1835 prevented his taking the oath in the following September, and the new corporation elected Barth as chief magistrate. Palmer occupied a seat in the reformed corporation as a representative of the south ward. In 1854 he was elected mayor, and was re-elected in the following year. He also served as deputy-lieutenant for the county of Suffolk. He was the chief promoter of the Victoria Building Company; and as a result of his attention, the Priory Hall was restored and converted to a "National" school, and the whole of the seafront was developed as a seaside resort, with the new Marine Parade and the erection of a series of buildings, notably the Britannia Terrace, the Carlton Hotel (as it became), the Assembly Rooms (Masonic Lodge), and the Wellington Pier. In 1830 he was elected a fellow of the Society of Antiquaries.

He died at his residence, Villa Graham, Great Yarmouth, on 24 September 1882. He married Amelia Graham, daughter of John Mortlock Lacon, but they had no children.

== Works ==
Palmer edited The History of Great Yarmouth, by Henry Manship, Great Yarmouth, 1854, and wrote The History of Great Yarmouth, designed as a Continuation of Manship's History of that Town, Great Yarmouth, 1856. An independent account is that of A. D. Bayne, a contemporary of Palmer, who published his History of the East of England at the same period.

His other works are:

- The History and Illustrations of a House in the Elizabethan Style of Architecture, the property of John Danby Palmer, Esq., and situated in the borough-town of Great Yarmouth, privately printed, London, 1838, with drawings and engravings by Henry Shaw, F.S.A.
- A Booke of the Foundacion and Antiquitye of the Towne of Greate Yermouthe: from the original manuscript written in the time of Queen Elizabeth: with notes and an appendix. Edited by C. J. Palmer, Great Yarmouth, 1847. Dedicated to Dawson Turner. The reputed author of the manuscript is Henry Manship the elder.
- Remarks on the Monastery of the Dominican Friars at Great Yarmouth, Yarmouth, 1852, reprinted from vol. iii. of the ‘Norfolk Archæology.’
- The Perlustration of Great Yarmouth, with Gorleston and Southtown, 3 vols. Great Yarmouth, 1872–4–5.
- Memorials of the Family of Hurry, of Great Yarmouth, Norfolk, and of New York, United States, Norwich, privately printed, 1873, with plates.

Palmer also edited, with Stephen Tucker, Rouge Croix pursuivant, Palgrave Family Memorials, privately printed, Norwich, 1878, with illustrations. After his death appeared Leaves from the Journal of the late Chas. J. Palmer, F.S.A. Edited, with notes, by Frederick Danby Palmer, Great Yarmouth, 1892.
