= Thomas Vaughan (bodysnatcher) =

British bodysnatcher (c. 1827)

Thomas Vaughan was a bodysnatcher active in Great Yarmouth, Norfolk, in 1827. During this period, Vaughan exhumed at least 10 corpses from St. Nicholas' Churchyard and sold them to surgeons in London for dissection.

== Career ==
In 19th century, the profitable business of bodysnatching, or "resurrectionism," was fueled by the high demand for cadavers for medical dissection, as prior to the Anatomy Act in 1832, the only legal yet insufficient source of human cadavers was the bodies of criminals executed by the officials.

Vaughan was among the few local resurrectionists employed by Sir Astley Cooper, son of the vicar at St. Nicholas' Church and the surgeon for Queen Victoria. Vaughan rented a house in Row 6 near White Horse Plain, later nicknamed "Body-Snatcher's Row", and used sawdust to conceal the bodies, which were shipped to London via Norwich in wagons, packed in crates and canvas bags. The cadavers would be placed in a room near St. Bartholomew's Hospital for the surgeons to choose. It is recorded that Vaughan exhumed at least ten bodies, including two children, from the churchyard before being arrested, receiving between ten and twelve guineas for each body.

He was arrested due to a betrayal of a female friend. After his arrest, he was sentenced to six months in prison as the court deemed bodysnatching only as a misdemeanour. During his sentence in Norwich Prison, he and his wife were supported financially by his surgeon clients. He continued bodysnatching after being released, and a later incident, when he was caught stealing the clothes from the corpses, saw him arrested again in 1831 and transported to Van Diemen's Land (now Tasmania), Australia.

== Aftermath ==
Historians estimated that more than 20 bodies were exhumed from the same churchyard in 1827. The news of body snatching elicited much fear and fury in the townspeople, as The Norfolk Chronicle reported at the time: '...wives were seen searching for the remains of their deceased husbands; husbands for those of their wives; and parents for their children. Bodies of the number of 20 or more were found to have been removed and the grief of those whose search was in vain can better be imagined than described.' The relatives of the dead opened many graves and it was said at the time that the graveyard had the appearance of a ploughed field. After 1827, high fences were put up around St Nicholas' churchyard to prevent a repetition of the crime.

The Anatomy Act was passed in 1832, finally granting doctors and medical students legal access to corpses that were unclaimed after death – in particular, corpses of those who had died in hospital, prison, or a workhouse, bringing an end to resurrectionism.

== Memorial ==
A blue plaque at Great Yarmouth Minster was unveiled by the Great Yarmouth Local History and Archaeological Society in 2011 to remember Thomas Vaughan. Dr Paul Davies, committee member of St Nicholas' Church Preservation Trust commented that without the cadavers medicine "wouldn't have progressed so fast" as "until quite late in the 19th Century people were still relying on the medical theories of the Romans - for nearly 2,000 years". St Nicolas' church curate Reverend James Stewart, who unveiled the plaque, also commented that it was important that despite the grisly crimes that were committed, the activities in the churchyard should be marked for their historical importance.
