= Britannia Monument =

Monument in Great Yarmouth, England

Coordinates: 52.5884°N 1.7336°E

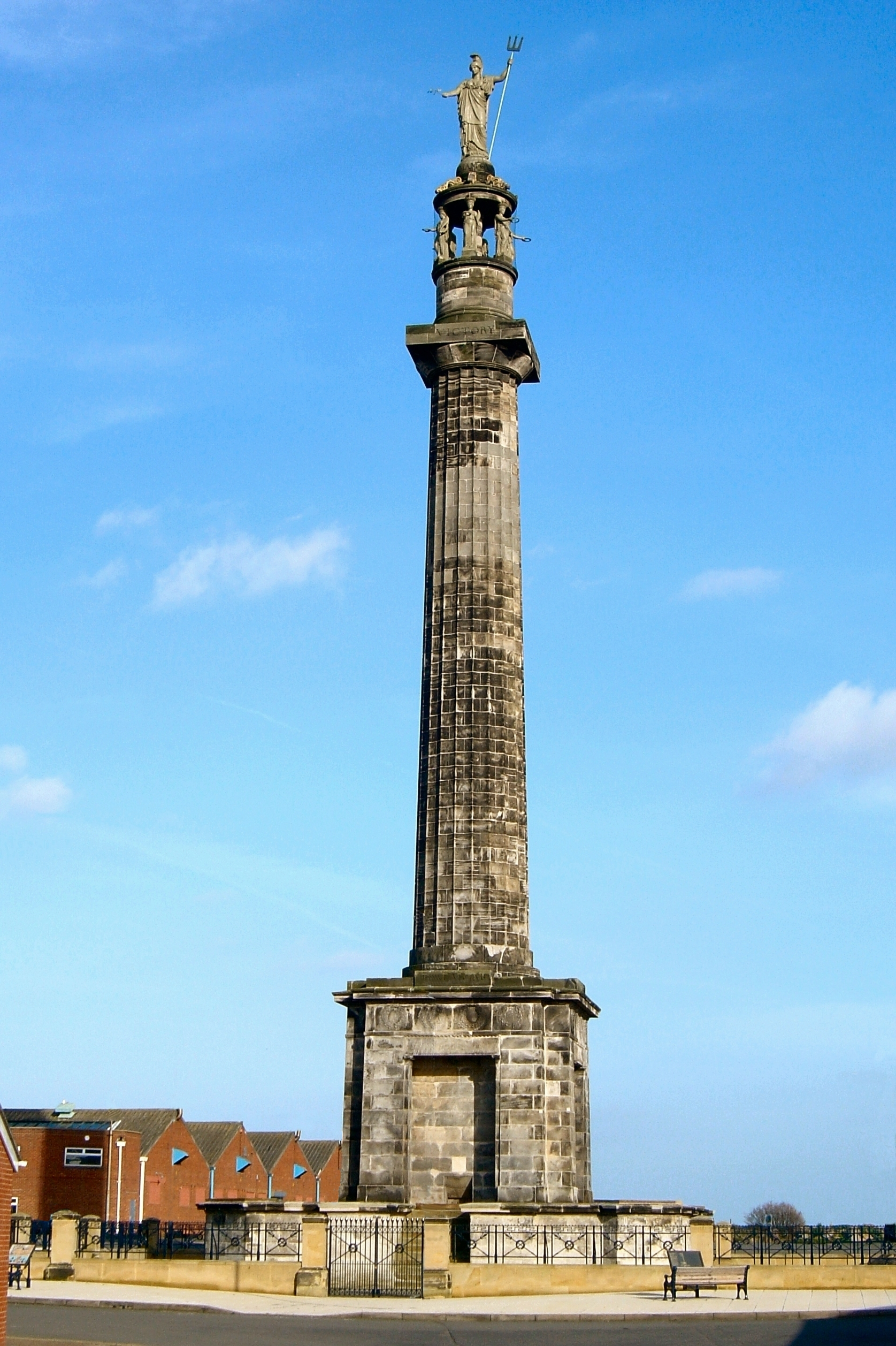
Britannia monument on 12 March 2007

The Britannia Monument is a commemorative column or tower built in memorial to Admiral Horatio Nelson, situated on the Denes, Great Yarmouth in the county of Norfolk, England. It was designated as a Grade I listed structure in 1953.

== History ==
Designed by architect William Wilkins, it was raised in the period 1817–19 from money raised by a committee of local magnates.

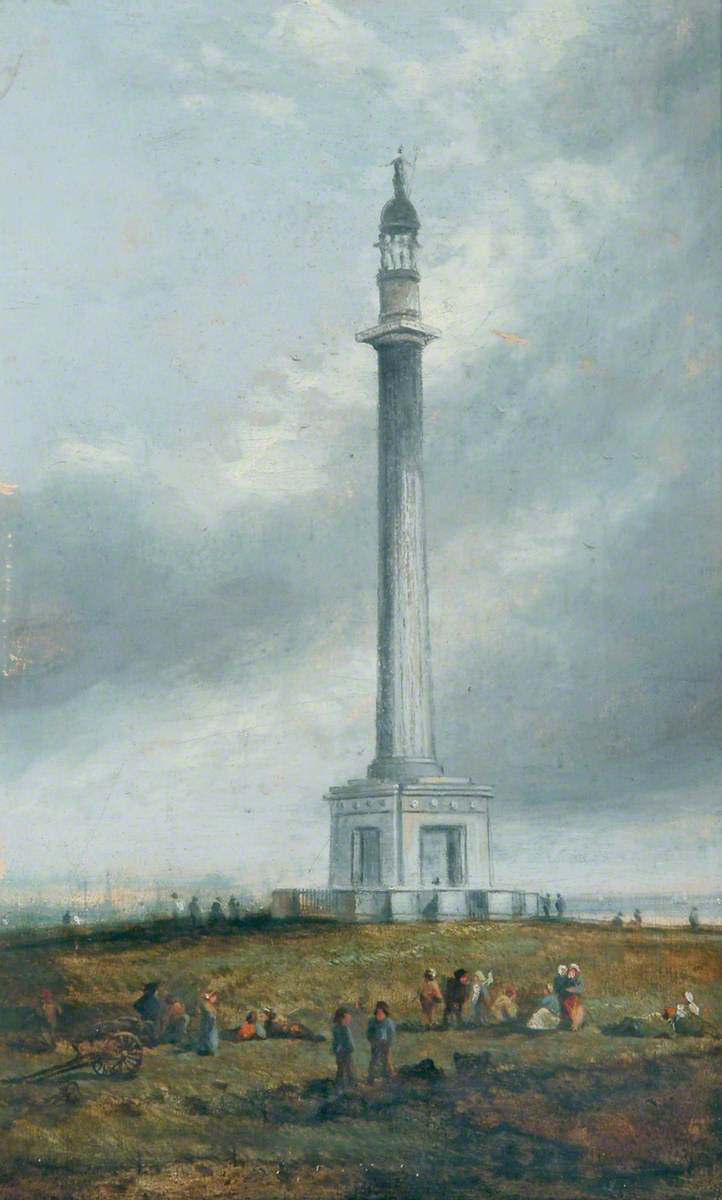
Painting of the monument by Joseph Stannard (1797–1830)

The first custodian of the monument was former Able Seaman James Sharman, a member of the crew of HMS Victory from Norfolk and one of those who carried Nelson below decks after he was shot.

The monument, correctly called the Norfolk Naval Pillar, is in the style of a Doric column topped by six caryatid figures that support a statue of Britannia proudly standing atop a globe inscribed with the motto from Nelson's coat of arms Palmam Qui Meruit Ferat (translates to "Let him who has merited it take the palm"), she holds an olive branch in her outstretched right hand, a trident in her left and looks inland – said to be towards Nelson's birthplace in Burnham Thorpe in Norfolk. The whole monument is 44 metres (144 ft) high, compared to 52 metres (171 ft) for the monument in Trafalgar Square, London and the top is reached by some two hundred and seventeen steps. The structure was completely restored in time for the bicentenary of the Battle of Trafalgar in 2005. In 2006 it was removed from English Heritage's Buildings At Risk register. In August 2006 it was rededicated. It currently stands, albeit separated in its own small railed plot, in an industrial estate.

The monument is open to the public on a limited basis.

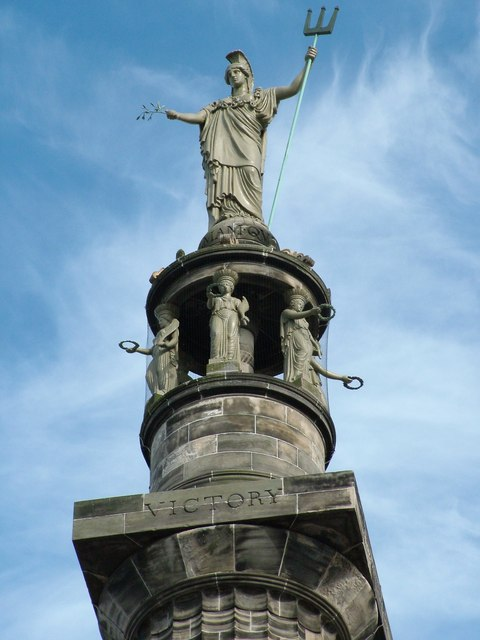
Figure of Britannia in 2005

In the late nineteenth century, the original synthetic Coade stone caryatids were replaced with concrete replicas. The figure of Britannia and the six caryatids were replaced by a fibreglass copy in 1982.

== Dedications ==
At the base inscriptions commemorate Nelson's four main victories over Britain's enemies the French and Spanish:

- The Nile (Aboukir), 1, 2 August 1798, HMS Vanguard
- Copenhagen, 1 April 1801, HMS Elephant
- St Vincent, 14 February 1797, HMS Captain
- Trafalgar, 21 October 1805, HMS Victory

On the top plinth are named four of the ships he sailed on for each battle.

On the western face – i.e. inland – a Latin inscription reads: "This great man Norfolk boasts her own, not only as born there of a respectable family, and as there having received his early education, but her own also in talents, manners and mind."

== Song and poem ==
There is a song called "Nelson's Monument" which refers to the monument.

The Irish poet George Croly wrote the poem "Nelson's Pillar" about this monument. The poem was written on the beach at Great Yarmouth on a stormy evening, and was first published in 1818:

There is a gloomy splendour in the Sun,
That levels his last beam along the shore;
The clouds are gathering o'er the Ocean, dun,
And stain'd with crimson streaks, like new-shed gore
On some broad field of battle; and the roar
Of wave and wind comes like the battle's sound.
From the Sea's verge a Column seems to soar,
A shaft of silver, on whose summit, wound
With golden beams, sits Britain's Image thron'd and crown'd.

And now the Sun sinks deeper, and the clouds,
In folds of purple fire, still heavier lour;
'Till sudden Night the shore and Ocean shrouds;
But thro' the tempest gleams that stately tow'r,
A giant height, on which the Sun-beams show'r
Their undiminish'd glories. NELSON's name
Is on the pillar. — Thus the stormy hour,
The clouds of battle, shew'd his spirit's flame,
Brighter and broader. — Thus shall blaze the Hero's fame.

— George Croly, Literary Gazette, and Journal of the Belles Lettres (1 August 1818) 490-91

== See also ==
- Nelson Monument, Edinburgh
- Nelson Monument, Liverpool
- Nelson's Monument on Birchen Edge, in England's Peak District
- Nelson's Column, London
- Nelson's Pillar, Dublin
