= Great Yarmouth Outer Harbour =

English port

Coordinates: 52.5759°N 1.7394°E

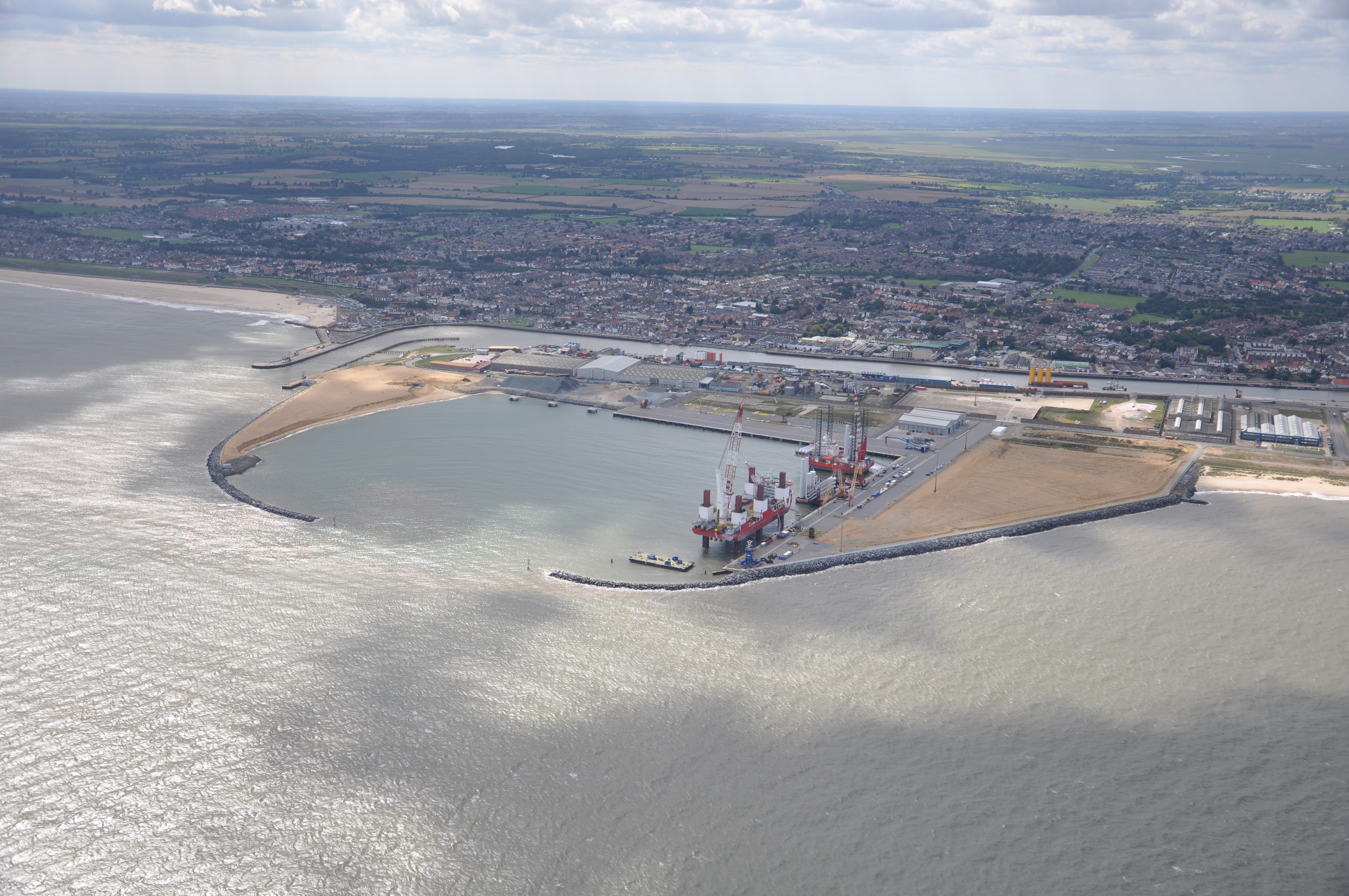
Aerial photograph of Great Yarmouth Outer Harbour, 2011

Great Yarmouth Outer Harbour is a port constructed on the east coast of England at Great Yarmouth. Construction work on the Outer Harbour began in June 2007. The harbour which is built in the South Denes area was planned to bring trade to the area. The plans included a container terminal and a passenger ferry terminal, but with no confirmed contracts these were not built.

== Planning and construction ==
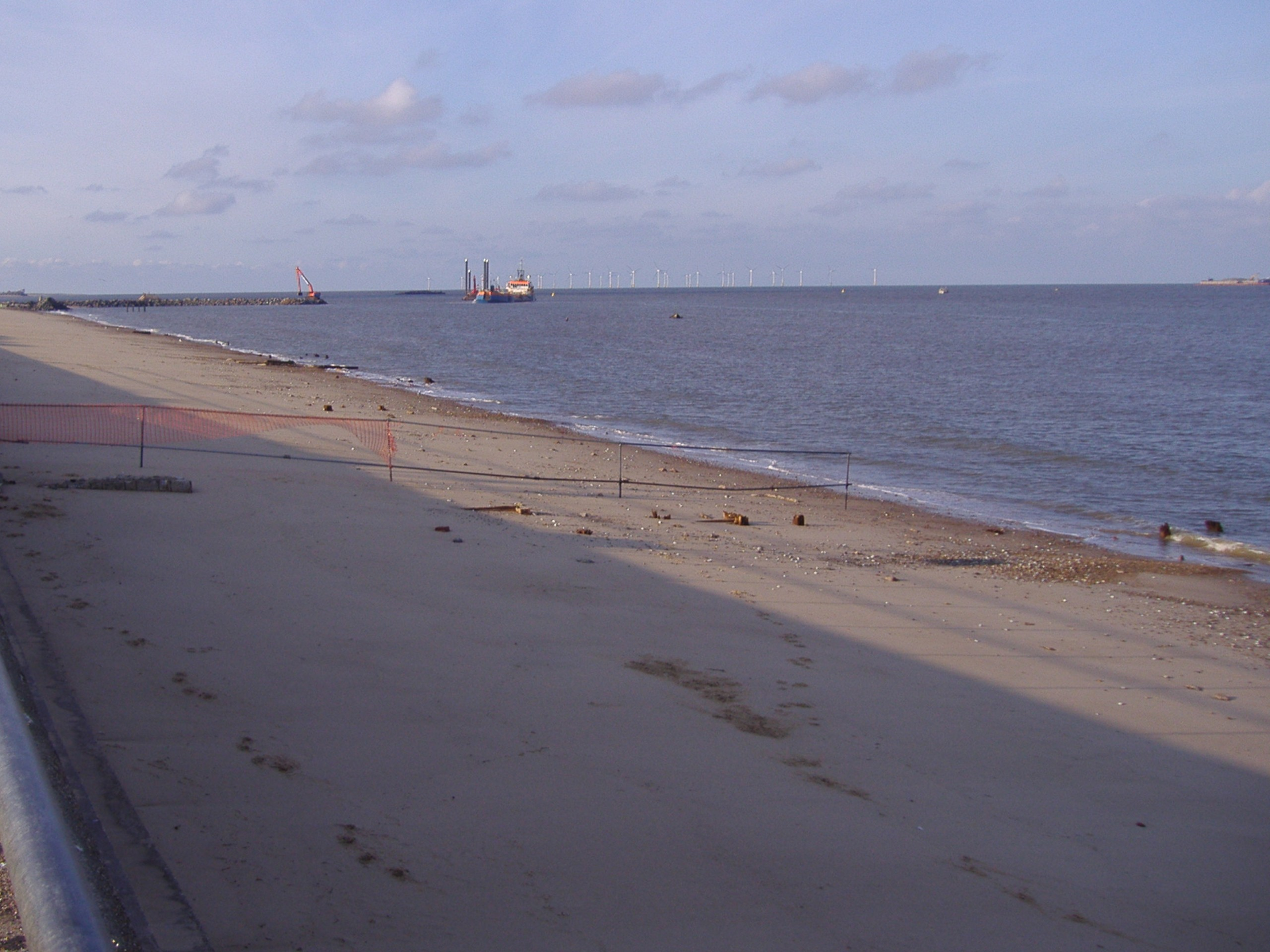
Construction of the outer Harbour August 2007

The contract for the harbour construction was awarded jointly to Van Oord UK Ltd and Edmund Nuttall Ltd. The contract was worth in the region of £75m. The new harbour consists of construction of two breakwaters with a total length of approximately 1,400m, requiring the importation of approximately 900,000 tons of rock materials. There was dredging and subsequent beneficial reuse of approximately 1,600,000 m3 of sand to provide 17.6 ha of land for future port development. The joint venture constructed approximately 450 metres of quay wall with associated capping beam and crane rail as well as 225 metres of revetment berth and associated berthing dolphins. Work commenced on site in June 2007. Completion was expected within two years with a fully operational container berth available after 18 months.

Great Yarmouth Port Company is a wholly owned subsidiary of International Port Holdings (IPH) which was formed in 2006 with a strategy to invest in small to medium-sized ports having the potential to expand in scope and scale, and to contribute to regeneration initiatives and economic development. The scheme received £8.75m in funding from the East of England Development Agency (EEDA). Great Yarmouth Port Authority and IPH reached an agreement for Great Yarmouth Port Company to develop the Outer Harbour and take over the operation of the port.

=== Progress ===
In 2000 a partnership of the port authority, Norfolk County Council and Great Yarmouth Borough Council had formed East Port Great Yarmouth Ltd bringing in Peter Hardy (special projects director at the county council who had previously delivered the multimillion-pound Millenium Forum project in Norwich), along with Tim Byles (chief executive of Norfolk County Council), Richard Packham (chief executive of the borough council), and Alex Woods (port manager). Importantly, some Norfolk personages also joined the new Eastport Board – Richard Jewson (Lord Lieutenant of Norfolk) as chairman, David Toot (managing director of Great Yarmouth Power) and Ian MacNicol of the Country Landowners Association. The new plans featured a smaller but eminently effective Outer Harbour able to accommodate larger vessels but at a cost which made the prospects for funding its construction far more attainable. In February 2005 the then Labour Secretary of State for Transport Alistair Darling finally announced £12 million of public funding for the Outer Harbour – including £2 million in cash from Norfolk County Council and £1 million in land from the borough council.

Construction commenced in 2007 and was completed on time and on budget by the spring of 2009. The new harbour saw the construction of two breakwaters of 850,000 tons of rock, 1,400 metres in length. Each arm has an internal Combi-pile wall of approximately 400 metres in length. Inside the harbour the seabed is dredged to 10 metres average depth. This produced 1.65 million cubic metres of sand which was used for reclamation work on the new harbour. The remains of a 34-year-old wreck, the 353-ton Dutch coaster Polaris, were removed from the harbour. The Polaris, which sank in February 1973, had lain on the seabed about 100 metres from the shoreline in the middle of the outer harbour site.

That the new deep water outer harbour was constructed during the height of the world economic crash was an achievement in itself but the changed economy at the time of opening in 2009 – with surplus capacity in other ports like Felixstowe – meant that the original plans for a schedule of two ro-pax ferries operating a thrice-daily service were not going to be delivered in the short term.

In late April 2009, the northern quay was substantially complete with fenders, mooring bollards and gantry crane rails installed. The arrival of the Zhen Hua 6, carrying two gantry cranes manufactured by ZPMC happened on 4 May 2009.

On 19 May 2009 Gantry Crane 01 was unloaded from the ship after bad weather had caused a delay to this operation. On 21 May 2009 Gantry Crane 02 was unloaded from the ship. Both cranes have stood idle since their arrival, except for a few training sessions.

The cranes were installed speculatively by the Port of Singapore with a view to seeking break-out loads from Rotterdam for onward journey to Midlands and the North-West – but this strategy was abandoned after a short time and the cranes were relocated elsewhere. In the short-term the failure of PSA's container cranes to attract trade drew copious negative coverage in the media and it led to claims that the outer harbour was a complete "white elephant". In reality between 2010 and 2015 International Port Holdings – trading as Eastport UK – operated both the Inner Port and Outer Harbour on a very profitable basis on the basis of traditional general cargos, offshore support and exploration, and new use of the Outer Harbour for the very large Sea Jacks vessels connected to the energy industry which could never previously have been accommodated in the river port. They invested in improvements to the Outer Harbour structure to alleviate teething problems and relocated their port offices to the old Omnipac site close to the new harbour.

The future potential of the port was clearly demonstrated when in December 2015 one of the UK's largest port groups Peel Ports (which operated ports in Liverpool, Manchester, Medway, Glasgow and Belfast amongst others) purchased IPC's interests in the Yarmouth Port for an estimated £50 million.

In May 2016 the millionth tonne of grain was exported through the Yarmouth Port six years after merchants Gleadell invested £5 million in developing a grain terminal in the new Outer Harbour. It is one of only seven or eight English ports capable of loading vessels over 13,000 tonnes. The millionth tonne was part of a 27,500 tonne cargo loaded onto the MV Resko.

In July 2016 Peel Ports Great Yarmouth welcomed the largest vessel to enter the Yarmouth Outer Harbour – at 200 metres in length and weighing in at 64,000 tonnes – the Glovis Splendor unloaded a cargo of 3,300 cars destined for UK car dealerships.

In November 2016 Peel Ports embarked on a major strengthening of the outer harbour quays – to the seaward side of South Beach Parade to prepare for the construction of giant turbines from March 2017 as part of the multimillion-pound Galloper and East Anglia One windfarm projects.

== Gallery ==
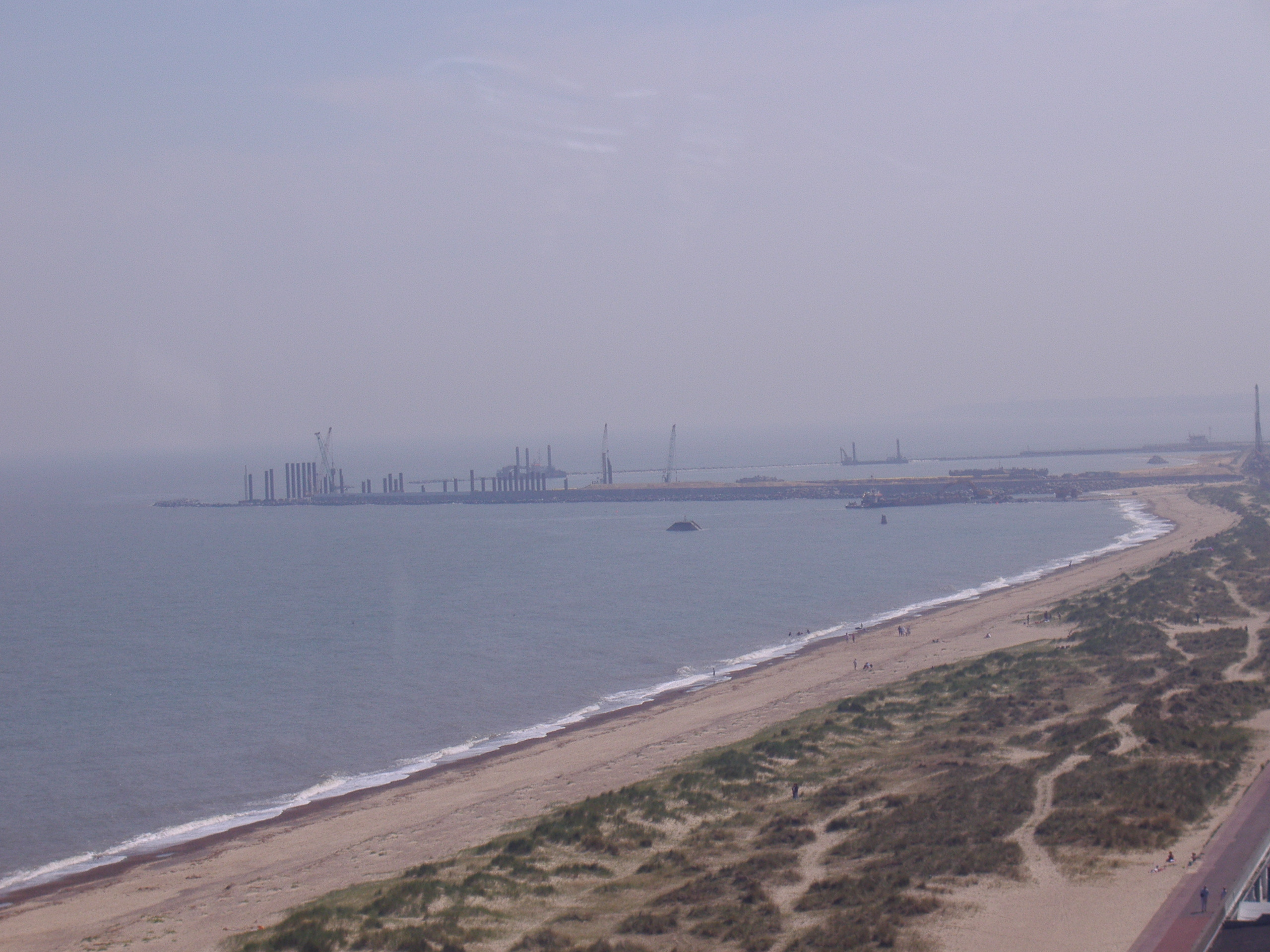
Progress of the construction, July 2008

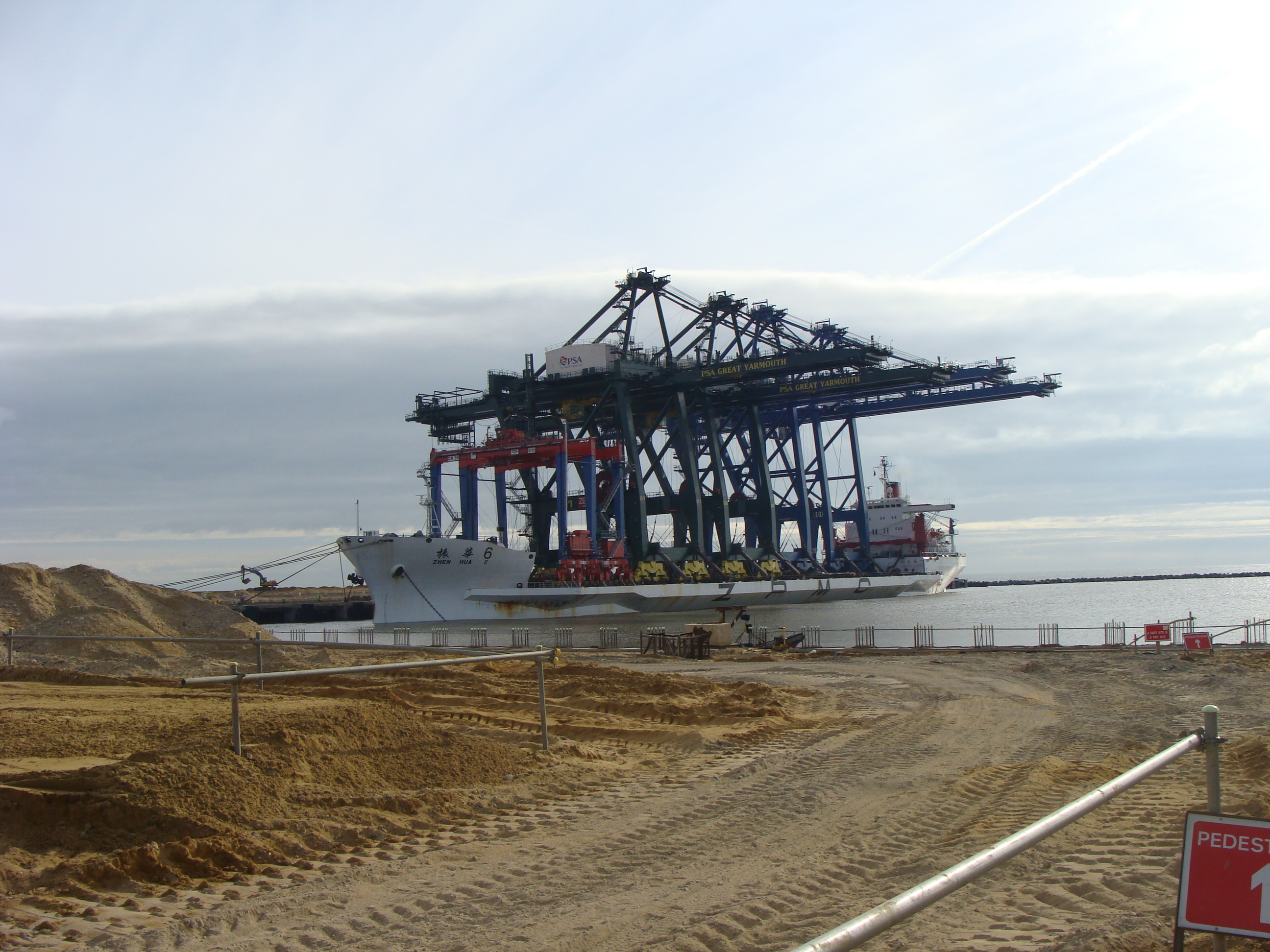
Zhen Hua 6 with the Gantry Cranes, May 2009

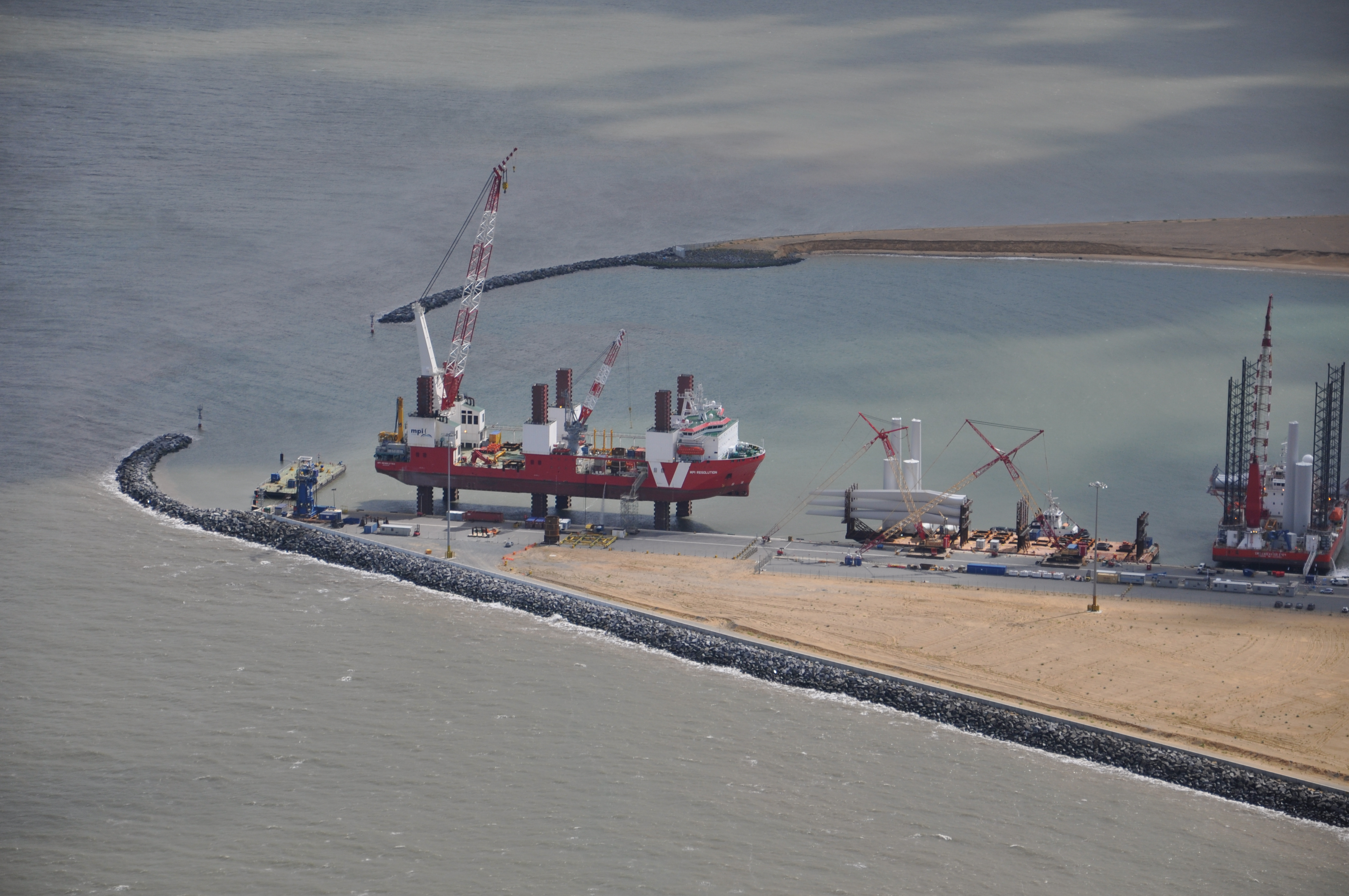
MPI Resolution turbine installation vessel, August 2011
