= Reginald Edwards (cricketer) =

English cricketer and British Army officer

Personal information
- Full name: Reginald Owen Edwards
- Born: 17 October 1881; Great Yarmouth, Norfolk, England
- Died: 15 November 1925 (aged 44); Bishop's Stortford, Hertfordshire, England
- Batting: Right-handed

Domestic team information
- Years: Team
- 1920: Norfolk
- 1921–1922: Cambridgeshire

Career statistics
| Competition | First-class |
|---|---|
| Matches | 1 |
| Runs scored | 1 |
| Batting average | 1.00 |
| 100s/50s | –/– |
| Top score | 1 |
| Catches/stumpings | –/– |
- Source: Cricinfo, 15 July 2019

Reginald Owen Edwards (17 October 1881 – 15 November 1925) was an English first-class cricketer and British Army officer.

Edwards was born at Great Yarmouth. He served in the First World War, being commissioned as a second lieutenant with the King's Royal Rifle Corps in September 1914. He was made a temporary lieutenant in December 1914, before being made a temporary captain in August 1915. He was transferred to the Army Cyclist Corps in November 1915. By December 1917, he was serving with the Tank Corps, ceasing to belong to the Corps in July 1919, when he was transferred to the Royal Engineers. He was badly gassed in the war. He was made a temporary major in August 1919, before relinquishing his commission in March 1920.

After the war, he played minor counties cricket for Norfolk in 1920, making two appearances in the Minor Counties Championship. He played minor counties cricket for Cambridgeshire in 1921 and 1922, making two appearances in the Minor Counties Championship. He made a single appearance in first-class cricket for The Rest against the Royal Air Force at Eastbourne in 1922. Batting twice in the match at number eleven, he ended The Rest's first-innings unbeaten without scoring, while in their second-innings he was dismissed for a single run by Charlie Parker. Edwards was a cricket enthusiast, often travelling around England to watch major matches, and was well known to many of the prominent county cricketers of the day. He enjoyed travelling, spending a considerable amount of time in Africa, as well as travelling through Southern Russia, well known for doing so with a copy of the Wisden Cricketers' Almanack. He died at Bishop's Stortford in November 1925.
