= Market Gates Shopping Centre =

Market Gates Shopping
- Location: Great Yarmouth, Norfolk, UK
- Coordinates: 52.6078°N 1.7282°E
- Opened: 1976; 50 years ago
- Developer: Miller
- Manager: DTZ Management
- Owner: Ellandi LLP
- Num. of stores: 40
- Num. of anchor tenants: 5 - New Look; B&M; Boots; Superdrug and Starbucks
- Floor area: 9,300 m^{2} (100,000 sq ft)approx.
- Floors: 2
- Parking: 568 spaces
- Website: marketgates-shopping.co.uk

Market Gates Shopping Centre is based in the seaside resort of Great Yarmouth, Norfolk. It was first opened in 1976.

== The Centre ==
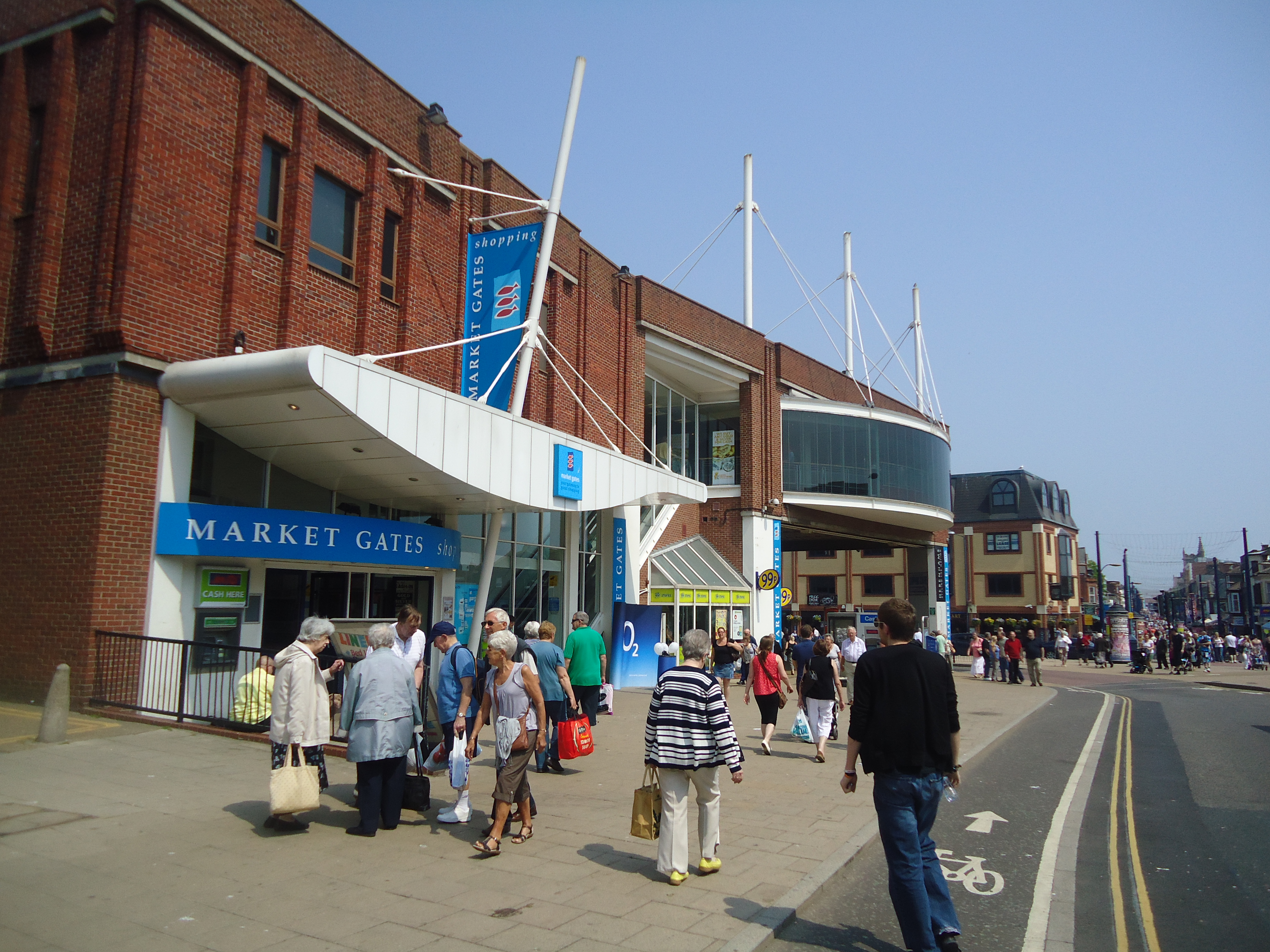
Market Gates Shopping Centre (Regent Road entrance) in May 2012.

The shopping centre currently houses 40 stores over 9,300 m^{2} (100,000 sq ft) approx. of gross leasable area. It comprises a mostly high street brands with a smaller number of independent retailers. The centre was built in 1976 on an area which was damaged during World War II and incorporates a bus station underneath and a multi-story car park to the east. It has two main entrances, one from the Market Place, via a slope, and another from the bus lane section of Regent Road, via an escalator This is close to the towns bus station, fast food outlets and the towns JD Wetherspoon public house, known as 'The Troll Cart'.

== Expansion ==
Work begun in the summer of 2007 on an expansion to the shopping centre. It involved the demolition of the old Coach House, the construction of a new concourse over the bus station and the remodelling of the centre's interior. On 30 October 2008 the extension opened to the public, with branches of Debenhams, New Look and Starbucks. Brighthouse; a rent-to-own retailer, a Card Factory shop, also the EE and O2 mobile phone retailers have moved in since the opening but some units remain unlet as of late-2010 possibly due to the late-2000s recession. The shopping centre was given further negative news on Friday 26 April 2019 when it was announced that the Debenhams store, which has been in extended part of the centre since 2008 was named amongst 22 stores nationally earmarked for closure. It closed in January 2020.

== Administration ==
In early March 2012 Miller Developments formally announced that the shopping centre had entered administration. On 2 March 2012 it was confirmed that the administrator handling the sale of Market Gates Shopping Centre was Deloitte Deloitte were appointed Administrators on behalf of Bank of Scotland who own the shopping centre following the transfer of ownership on 29 February 2012.

== Bought ==
In November 2013 a group called Ellandi bought Market Gates for £28m. Ellandi plan to upgrade and expand Market Gates providing an extra 1,904 m^{2} (20,490 sq ft) over two levels.

== Fire ==
In early March 2012, firefighters were called to deal with a blaze at the shopping centre, which involved a sign.
