= Wellington Pier =

Pier in Great Yarmouth, England

Coordinates: 52.599268°N 1.737008°E

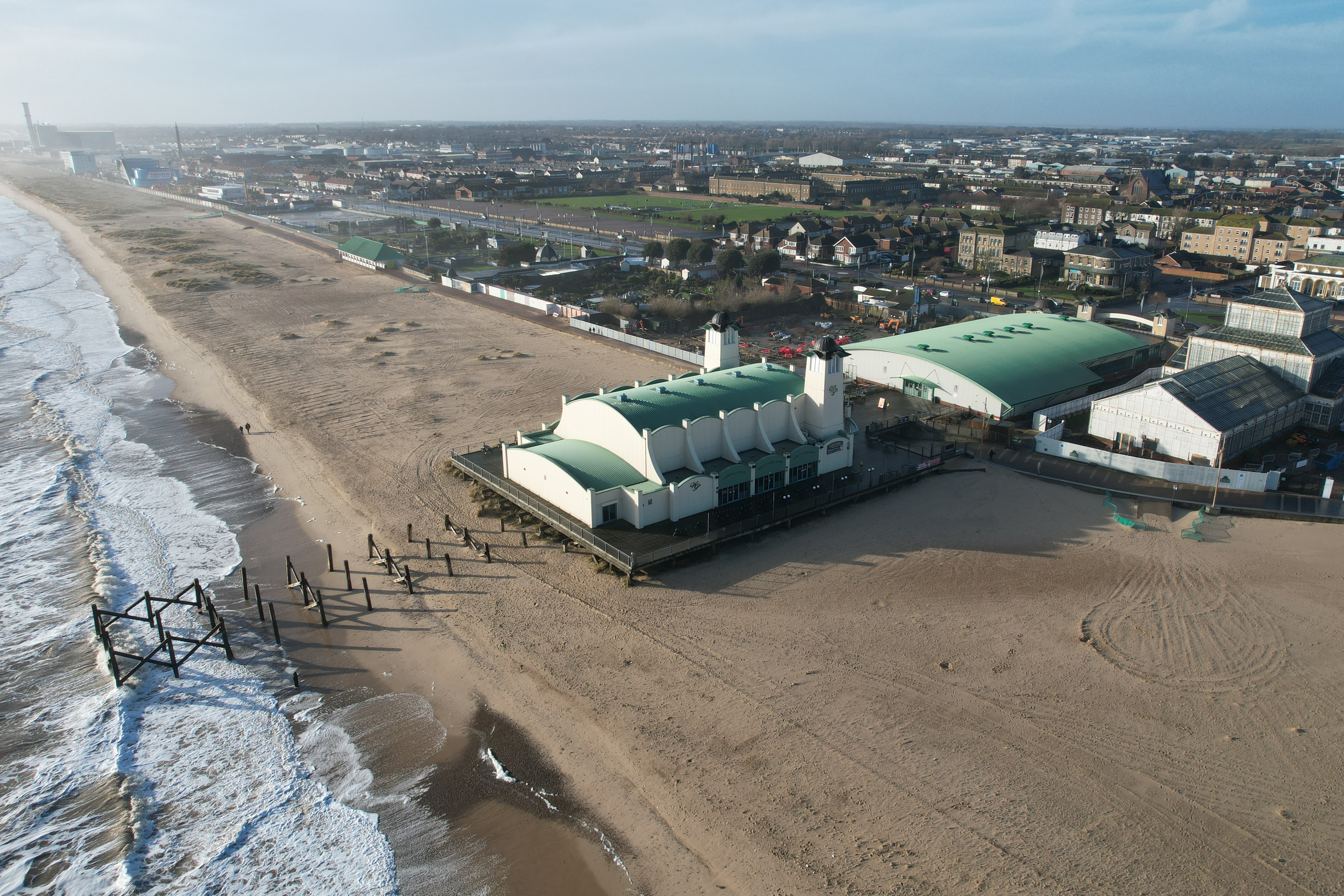
- Wellington Pier in 2026
- Type: Pleasure pier
- Official name: Wellington Pier
- Owner: Family Amusements

Characteristics
- Total length: 700 feet (210 m)

History
- Designer: P. Ashcroft
- Opening date: 31 October 1853

Wellington Pier is located in Great Yarmouth in the county of Norfolk, England.

== History ==
Great Yarmouth Wellington Pier Act 1853
- Act of Parliament
- Parliament of the United Kingdom
- Long title: An Act for constructing and maintaining a Pier at Great Yarmouth in the County of Norfolk, to be called "The Great Yarmouth Wellington Pier."
- Citation: 16 & 17 Vict. c. xv

Dates
- Royal assent: 9 May 1853

Text of statute as originally enacted

The pier was authorised by the Great Yarmouth Wellington Pier Act 1853 (16 & 17 Vict. c. xv) and opened on 31 October 1853 and the 210-metre (690 ft) wooden structure cost £6,776 to build. The pier was designed by P. Ashcroft. In its first year of opening the pier was a huge success and made an impressive profit for the time of £581. Five years later a second pier was built close to the Wellington which had a very large financial effect on the profitability of the pier. By 1899 Great Yarmouth Corporation bailed out the failing business for the sum of £1,250 and had plans to improve the entertainment and amusement of the pier. On 13 July 1903 a new Pavilion was opened and a failed Winter gardens was bought from Torquay and was incorporated into the design of the pier.

== Twentieth century ==
In the early 1970s, the pier was substantially strengthened with major steelwork renovations. It was leased from the local council by entertainer Jim Davidson in 1996. He invested around £750,000 of his own money; this was spent on the inside, but the outside was left as neither the lottery nor local projects would fund it. The theatre stood empty until it was partially demolished in early 2005. By late 2005 the front part of the pier has been totally re-developed as an amusement arcade. Between 2005 and 2010 shows were held at the theatre starring Jim Davidson and Bradley Walsh and featured support vocalists such as Tracy Dean.

Since taking over the lease from Davidson, Family Amusements now run the entire Wellington and Wintergardens complex, along with the Britannia Pier further north on the seafront. The Winter Gardens was previously a large children's indoor play area, with cafe and bar. Oddly, the aluminium trussing installed by Jim Davidson as part of the Wintergardens nightclub has been retained – as it looks very futuristic, incorporating curves and other abstract shapes, However the Winter Gardens now stands empty having closed during 2008 due to concerns about structural integrity. The play equipment was removed in 2010 and the 1903 structure awaits its fate.

By September 2008 the old theatre at the end of the pier had been converted to become a large bowling alley and bars. The original steel and ironwork has been restored and returned to the new building. The 100-year-old original girders are now visible, having been originally hidden in the theatre roof space. The newer building is so similar to the (demolished) old theatre that many visitors do not realise it is a new building. The ten-lane full-size bowling alley takes up most of the space in what was the old auditorium and stage space. An 80-foot-long stained-glass picture was found during the removal of the original Wellington pier theatre structure; it has been restored and will be the centrepiece of the entrance to the new complex. It depicts ships sailing into the port of Great Yarmouth.
