= Great Yarmouth =

Seaside town in Norfolk, England

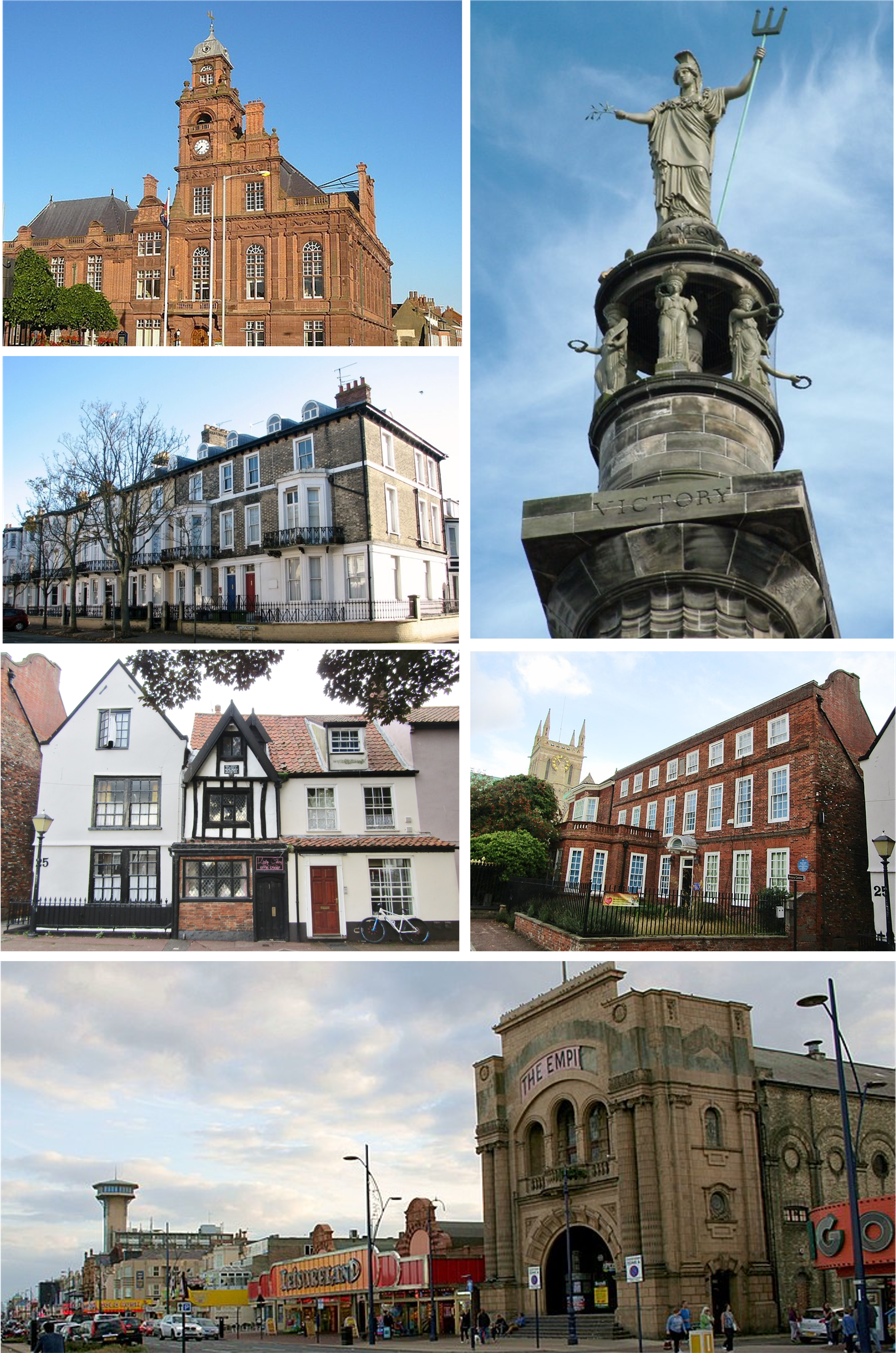
- Clockwise from top left: Great Yarmouth Town Hall, Britannia Monument, Old Vicarage with the tower of the minster church in background, Church Plain, Empire Theatre and Marine Parade, Anna Sewell's House, Camperdown

- motto: Rex et Nostra Jura (Latin) "The King and Our Rights"

- Location within Norfolk
- Area: 3.89 sq mi (10.1 km^{2})
- Population: 28,985 (Built-up area, 2021); 99,745 (Borough, 2021)
- OS grid reference: TG5207
- District: Great Yarmouth
- Shire county: Norfolk
- Region: East
- Country: England
- Sovereign state: United Kingdom
- Areas of the town: List: Bradwell; Caister-on-Sea (Village); Gorleston-on-Sea (Town); Hopton-on-Sea (Village); Runham; Southtown
- Post town: GREAT YARMOUTH
- Postcode district: NR30
- Dialling code: 01493
- Police: Norfolk
- Fire: Norfolk
- Ambulance: East of England
- UK Parliament: Great Yarmouth

Great Yarmouth (/ˈjɑːrməθ/ YAR-məth), often called Yarmouth, is a seaside town which gives its name to the wider Borough of Great Yarmouth in Norfolk, England; it straddles the River Yare and is located 20 miles (32 km) east of Norwich. Its fishing industry, mainly for herring, shrank after the mid-20th century and has all but ended. North Sea oil from the 1960s supplied an oil rig industry that services offshore natural gas rigs; more recently, offshore wind power and other renewable energy industries have ensued. In 2021 the built up area had a population of 28,985.

Yarmouth has been a resort since 1760 and a gateway from the Norfolk Broads to the North Sea. Holidaymaking rose when a railway opened in 1844, bringing easier, cheaper access and some new settlements. Wellington Pier opened in 1854, and Britannia Pier in 1858. Through the 20th century, Yarmouth boomed as a resort, with a promenade, pubs, trams, fish-and-chip shops, theatres, the Pleasure Beach, the Sea Life Centre, the Hippodrome Circus, the Time and Tide Museum and a Victorian seaside Winter Garden in cast iron and glass.

== Geography and demography ==
Great Yarmouth is located on a 3.1-mile (5.0 km) spit of land between the North Sea and River Yare. It features historic rows of houses in narrow streets and a main tourist sector on the seafront. It is linked to Gorleston, Cobholm and Southtown by Haven Bridge and to the A47 and A149 by Breydon Bridge. The urban area covers 8.3 sq mi (21 km^{2}) and according to the Office for National Statistics (ONS) in 2002 had a population of 47,288. It is the main town in the Borough of Great Yarmouth.

The ONS identifies a Great Yarmouth urban area as having a population of 68,317, which includes the sub-areas of Caister-on-Sea (population 8,756) and Great Yarmouth (population 58,032). The wider Great Yarmouth borough had a population of around 92,500, which increased to 97,277 at the 2011 United Kingdom census. Ethnically, Great Yarmouth was 92.8 per cent White British, with the next biggest ethnic demographic being Other White at 3.5 per cent – Eastern Europeans in the main.

== History ==
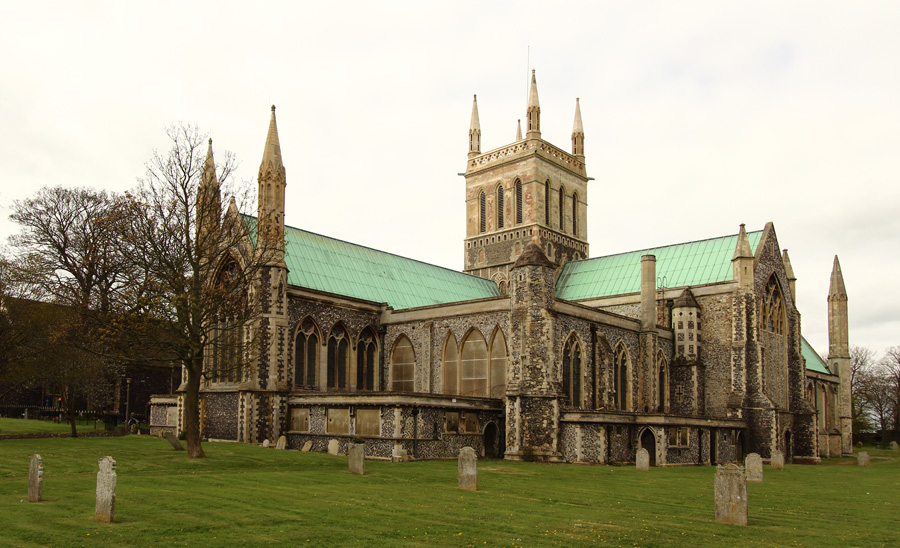
Great Yarmouth Minster

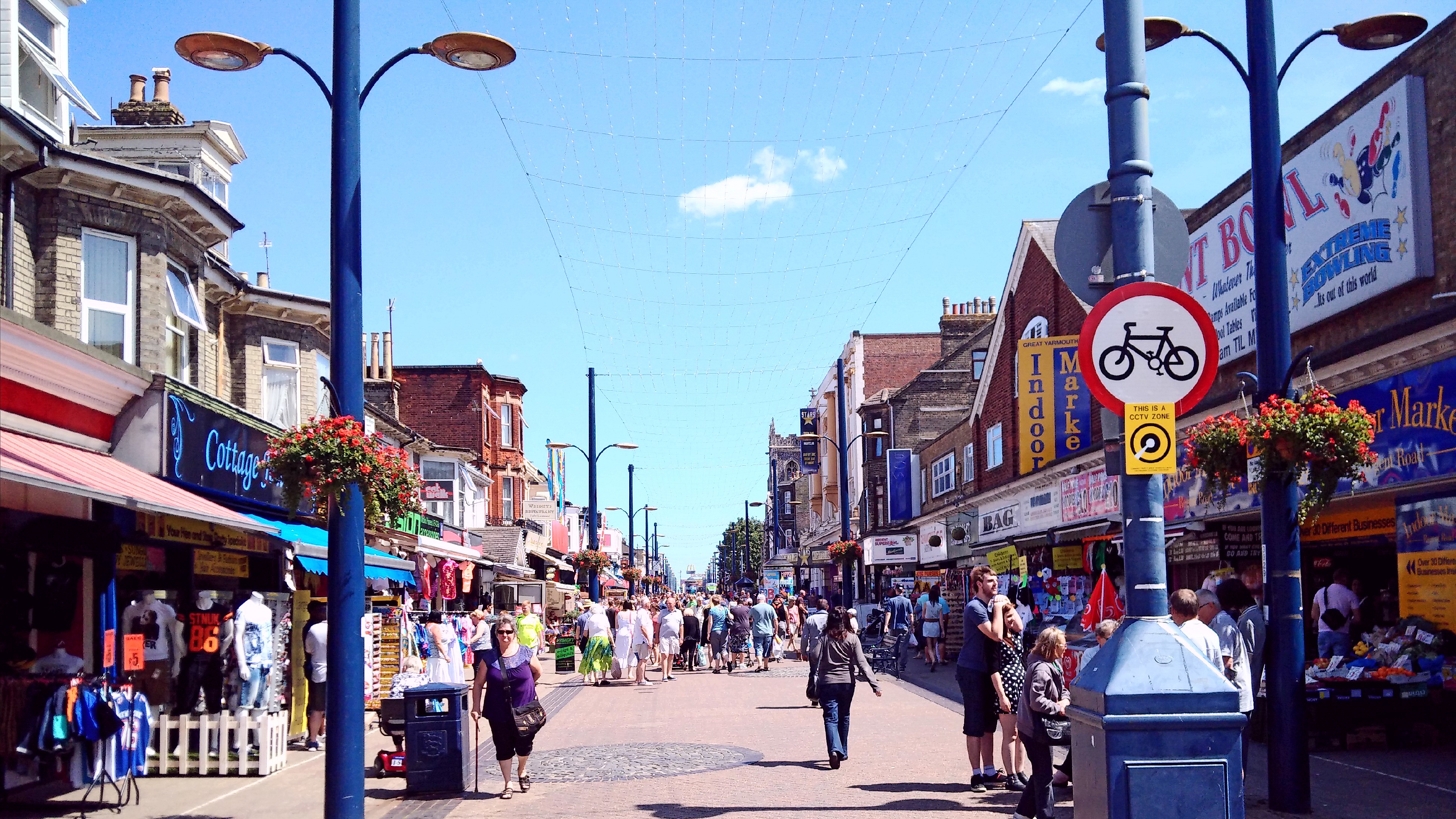
Regent Road

Great Yarmouth (Gernemwa, Yernemuth) lies near the site of the Roman fort camp of Gariannonum at the mouth of the River Yare. Its situation having attracted fishermen from the Cinque Ports, a permanent settlement was made, and the town numbered 70 burgesses before the Norman Conquest. Henry I placed it under the rule of a reeve.

In 1101, the Church of St Nicholas was founded by Herbert de Losinga, the first Bishop of Norwich, and consecrated in 1119. This was to be the first of several priories founded in what was a wealthy trading centre of considerable importance. In 1208, King John granted a charter to Great Yarmouth. The charter gave his burgesses of Yarmouth general liberties according to the customs of Oxford, a gild merchant and weekly hustings, amplified by several later charters asserting the rights of the borough against Little Yarmouth and Gorleston. The town is bound to send to the sheriffs of Norwich every year "one hundred herrings, baked in twenty-four pasties", which the sheriffs are to deliver to the lord of the manor of East Carlton, who is then to convey them to the King.

A hospital was founded in Great Yarmouth during the reign of Edward I by Thomas Fastolfe, father of Thomas Fastolf, Bishop of St David's. In 1551, a grammar school was founded, and the great hall of the old hospital was appropriated for its use. The school was closed from 1757 to 1860 but re-established by charity trustees and settled in new buildings in 1872.

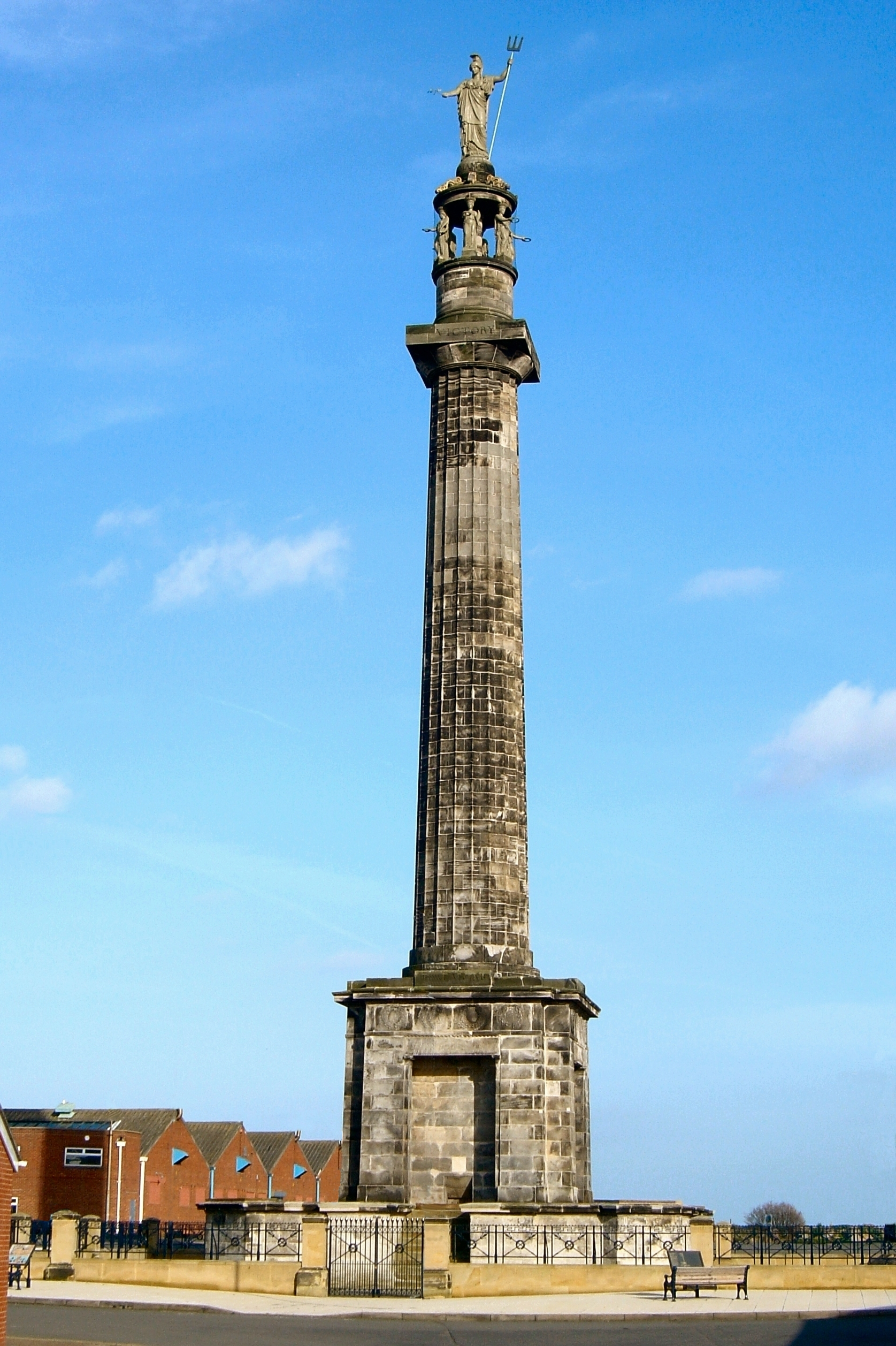
The 41-metre-tall (135 ft) Britannia Monument, built in 1817

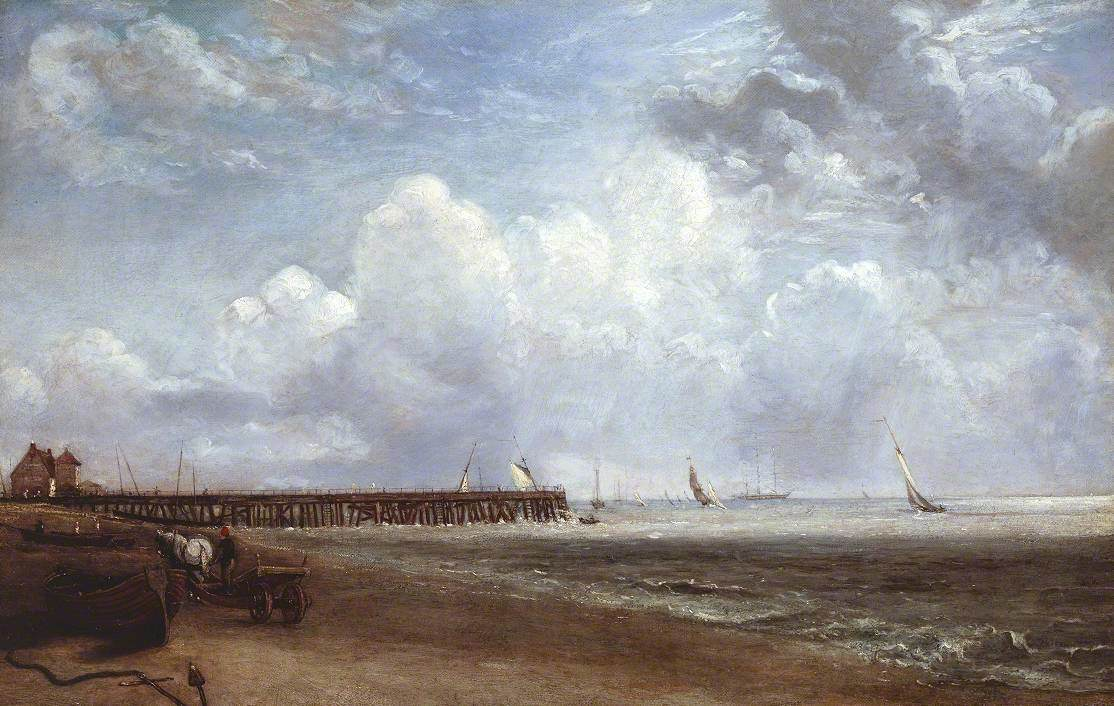
Yarmouth Jetty by John Constable, 1822

In 1552, Edward VI granted a charter of admiralty jurisdiction, later confirmed and extended by James I. Elizabeth I came to Great Yarmouth in July 1578. In 1668 a charter from Charles II extended the borough boundaries to also include Little Yarmouth (also known as Southtown), which lay on the opposite bank of the Yare in the parish of Gorleston in Suffolk. In 1703 a new charter from Queen Anne replaced the two bailiffs by a mayor. In 1673, during the Third Anglo-Dutch War, the Zealand Expedition was assembled in the town. In 1702, the Fishermen's Hospital was founded. In the early 18th century, Yarmouth, as a thriving herring port, was vividly and admiringly described several times in Daniel Defoe's travel journals, in part as follows:

Yarmouth is an ancient town, much older than Norwich; and at present, tho' not standing on so much ground, yet better built; much more complete; for number of inhabitants, not much inferior; and for wealth, trade, and advantage of its situation, infinitely superior to Norwich.

It is plac'd on a peninsula between the River Yare and the sea; the two last lying parallel to one another, and the town in the middle: The river lies on the west-side of the town, and being grown very large and deep, by a conflux of all the rivers on this side of the county, forms the haven; and the town facing to the west also, and open to the river, makes the finest key in England, if not in Europe, not inferior even to that of Marseille itself.

The ships ride here so close, and as it were, keeping up one another, with their head-fasts on shore, that for half a mile [800 m] together, they go cross the stream with their bolsprits over the land, their bowes, or heads, touching the very wharf; so that one may walk from ship to ship as on a floating bridge, all along by the shore-side: The key reaching from the drawbridge almost to the south-gate, is so spacious and wide, that in some places 'tis near one hundred yards from the houses to the wharf. In this pleasant and agreeable range of houses are some very magnificent buildings, and among the rest, the custom-house and town-hall, and some merchants' houses, which look like little palaces, rather than the dwelling-houses of private men.

The greatest defect of this beautiful town, seems to be, that tho' it is very rich and encreasing in wealth and trade, and consequently in people, there is not room to enlarge the town by building; which would be certainly done much more than it is, but that the river on the land-side prescribes them, except at the north end without the gate....

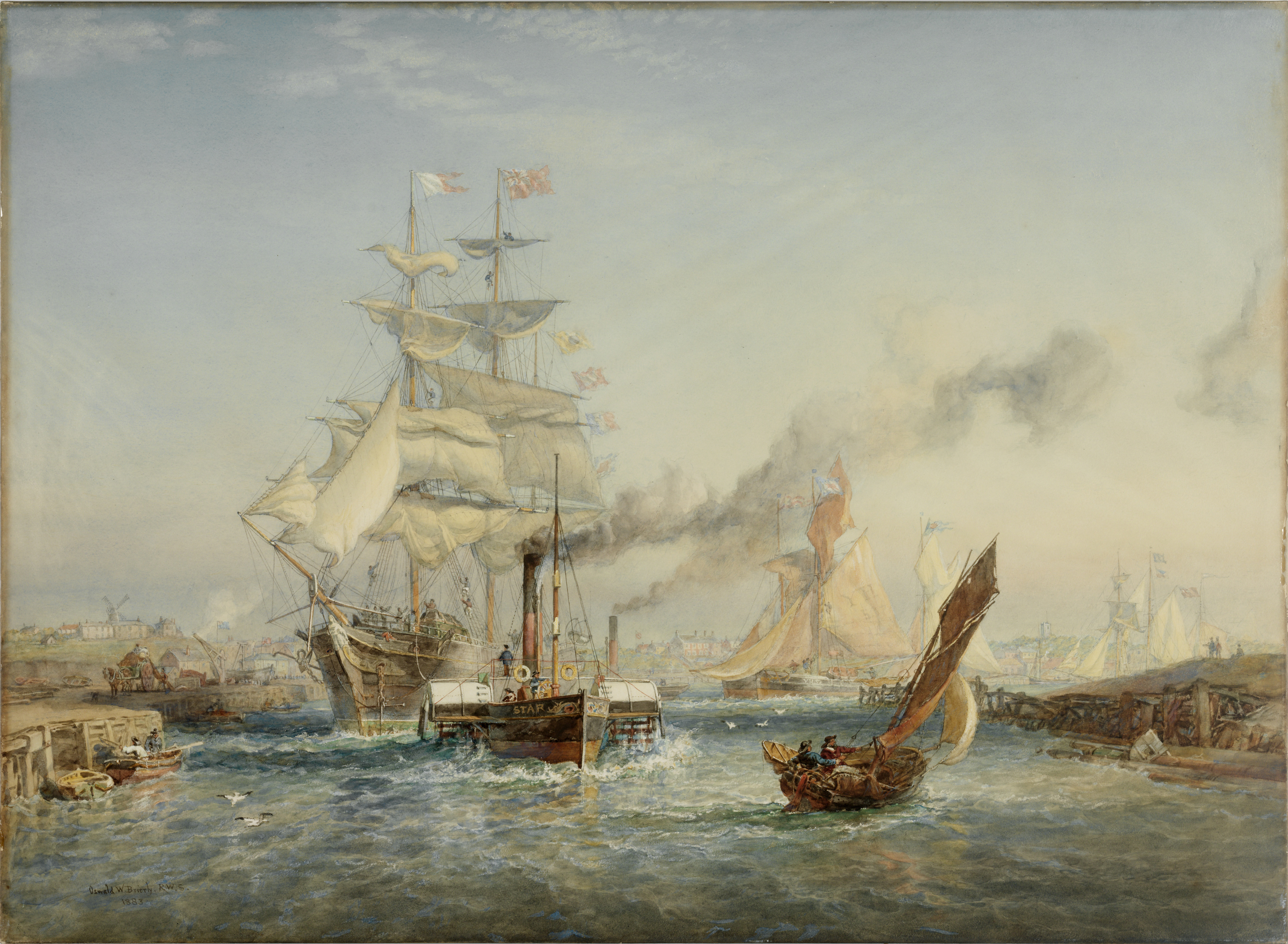
Going to Sea, Yarmouth, Norfolk, England, 1883, by Oswald W. Brierly

In 1797, during the French Revolutionary Wars, the town was the main supply base for the North Sea Fleet. The fleet collected at the Yarmouth Roads, from whence it sailed to the decisive Battle of Camperdown against the Dutch fleet. In 1803, Captain George Manby was appointed barrack-master at Great Yarmouth; during his time in post he invented the Manby mortar.

Again in 1807, during the Napoleonic Wars, the collected fleet sailed from the roadstead to the Battle of Copenhagen.

From 1808 to 1814, the Admiralty in London could communicate with its ships in Yarmouth by a shutter telegraph chain. Ships were routinely anchored offshore during the Napoleonic Wars and the town served as a supply base for the Royal Navy. Part of an Ordnance Yard survives from this period on Southtown Road, probably designed by James Wyatt: a pair of roadside lodges (which originally housed senior officers) frame the entrance to the site, which contains a sizeable armoury of 1806, a small barracks block and other ancillary buildings. Originally the depot extended down to a wharf on the River Yare and was flanked by a pair of storehouses, but these and other buildings were destroyed in The Blitz.

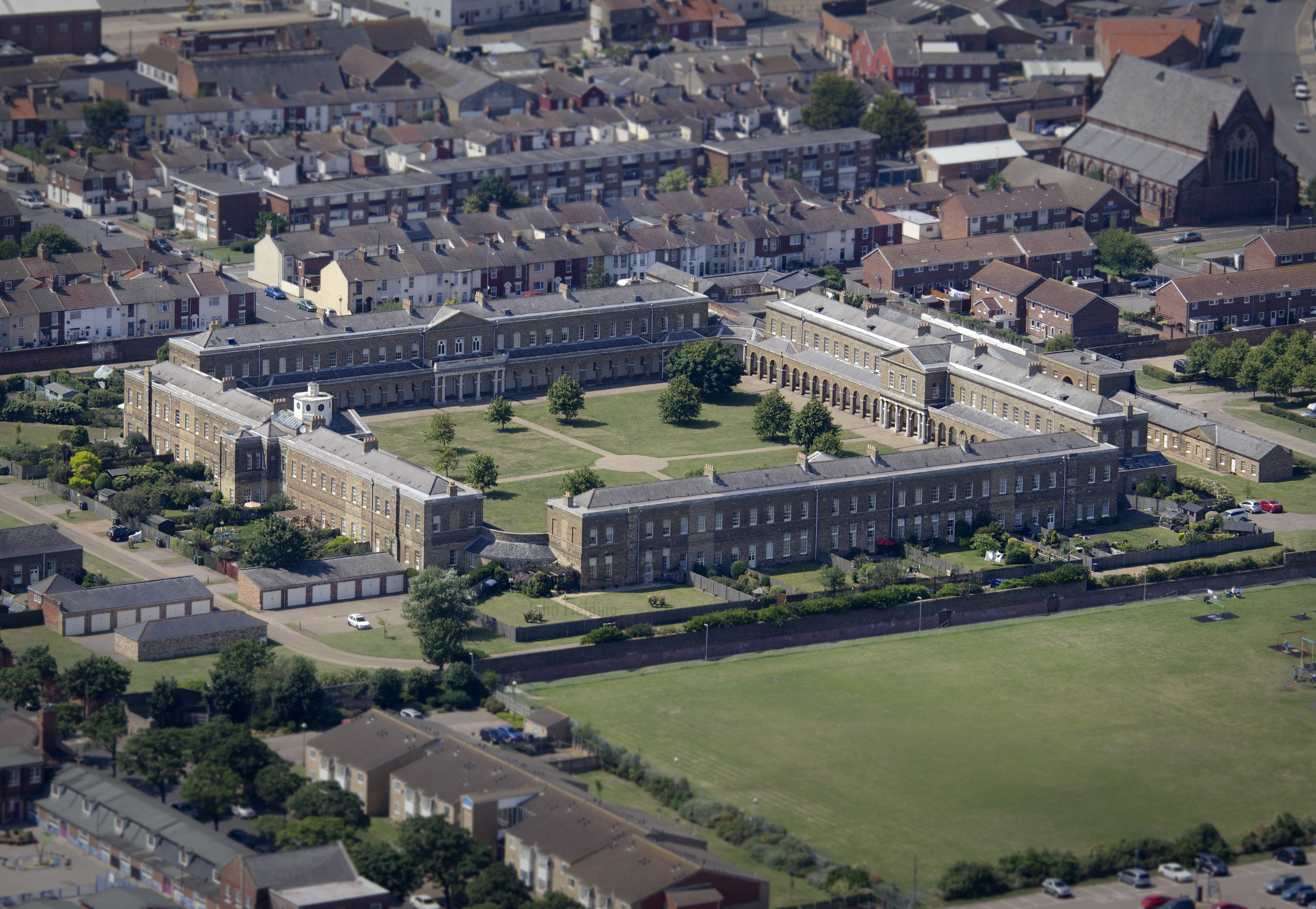
The former Royal Naval Hospital, now converted into flats

A grander survival is the former Royal Naval Hospital designed by William Pilkington, begun in 1806 and opened in 1811. The hospital consisted of four two-storey pavilions set around a courtyard, with a colonnaded walkway linking them; each block contained eight wards. It served only briefly as a naval hospital, during the last years of the Napoleonic Wars, before being handed over to the Army for use as barracks. In the early 1860s, however, it reverted to medical use, being reopened as a naval psychiatric hospital. It continued to serve in this capacity until 1958, when the premises were transferred to the NHS. After its closure in 1993, the buildings were turned into private residences.

The town was the site of a bridge disaster and drowning tragedy on 2 May 1845, when the Yarmouth suspension bridge, crowded with children, collapsed under the weight, killing 79. They had gathered to watch a clown in a barrel being pulled by geese down the river. As he passed under the bridge, the weight shifted, causing the chains on the south side to snap, tipping over the bridge deck.

Great Yarmouth had an electric tramway system from 1902 to 1933. From the 1880s until the First World War, the town was a regular destination for Bass Excursions, when fifteen trains would take 8,000–9,000 employees of Bass's Burton brewery on an annual trip to the seaside.

During World War I, Great Yarmouth was attacked by the Germans several times. The first occasion was on 3 November 1914 when the town was subject to a brief bombardment. The town experienced the first air raid on England, carried out by the German Imperial Navy's Zeppelin L 3 (LZ 24) on 19 January 1915. Later that year, on 15 August, Ernest Martin Jehan became the first—and only—person to sink a steel submarine while commanding a sail-rigged Q-ship, off the coast of Great Yarmouth. Although he led a crew, the feat is credited to him as the commanding officer. The town was bombarded again by the German Navy on 24 April 1916.

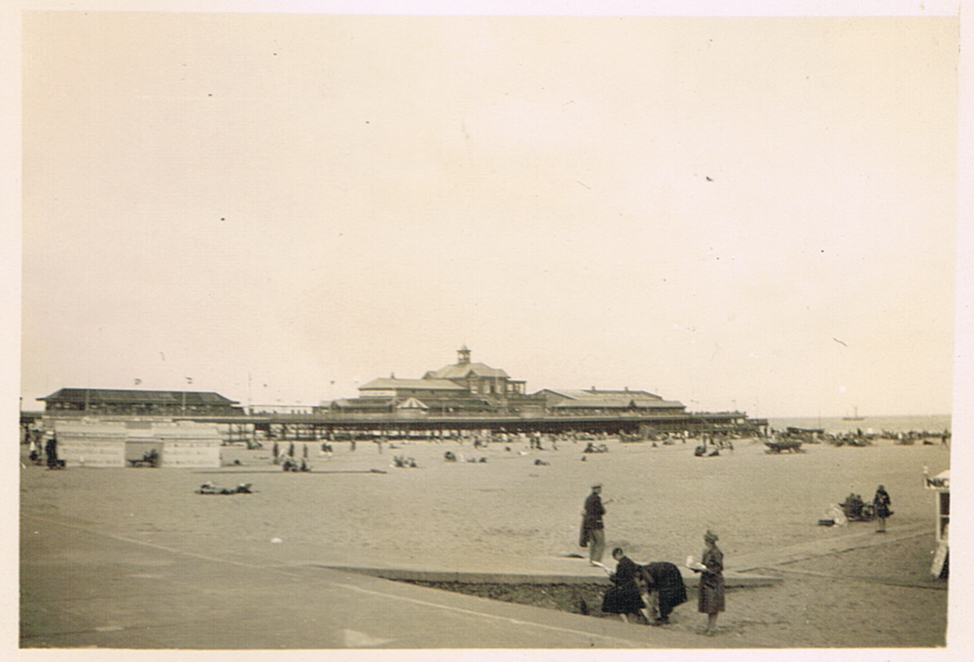
Wellington Pier in 1930

The town suffered from bombing raids by the German Luftwaffe during World War II, as the last significant place Germans could drop bombs before returning home, but much is left of the old town, including the original 2,000-metre (1.2 mi) protective medieval wall, of which two-thirds has survived, and eleven of the eighteen towers remain. On the South Quay is a 17th-century Merchant's House, as well as Tudor, Georgian and Victorian buildings. Behind South Quay is a maze of alleys and lanes known as "The Rows". Originally, there were 145. Despite war damage, several have remained.

The town was badly affected by the North Sea flood of 1953. More recent flooding has also been a problem, with four floods in 2006, the worst being in September. Torrential rain caused drains to block and an Anglian Water pumping station to break down, which caused flash flooding in which 90 properties were flooded up to 5 ft (1.5 m).

On 1 April 1974, the civil parish of Great Yarmouth was abolished.

The southern section of the 2 mi (3.2 km) A47 Great Yarmouth Western Bypass opened in May 1985, with the northern section opened in March 1986. The bypass was re-numbered as part of the A12, until it returned to being part of the A47 in February 2017.

In February 2023, there was an explosion on River Yare when disposal of unexploded ordnance from World War II resulted in accidental detonation.

== Sightseeing and tourism ==
Panorama of Hall Quay seen from Southtown, showing the Town Hall and Star Hotel. Historic South Quay continues to the right of the image.

The Tollhouse with dungeons, dating from the late 13th century, is one of Britain's oldest former gaols and oldest civic buildings. It backs onto the central library. Major sections of the medieval town walls survive around the parish cemetery and in parts of the old town.

Great Yarmouth Minster (the Minster Church of St Nicholas, founded in the 12th century as an act of penance) stands in Church Plain, just off the market place. It is the third largest parish church in England, after Beverley Minster in the East Riding of Yorkshire and Christchurch Priory in Dorset. Neighbouring Church Plain has the 17th-century timber-framed house where Anna Sewell (1820–1878), author of Black Beauty, was born.

The market place, one of England's largest, has functioned since the 13th century. It is also home to the town's shopping sector and the famous Yarmouth chip stalls. The smaller area south of the market is used as a performance area for community events and for access to the town's shopping centre, Market Gates.

Great Yarmouth railway station is the terminus of the Wherry Lines from Norwich. Before the Beeching Axe, the town had several stations and a direct link to London down the east coast. The only remaining signs of these are a coach park, where Beach Station once was, and the A12 relief road, which follows the route of the railway down into the embankment from Breydon Bridge.

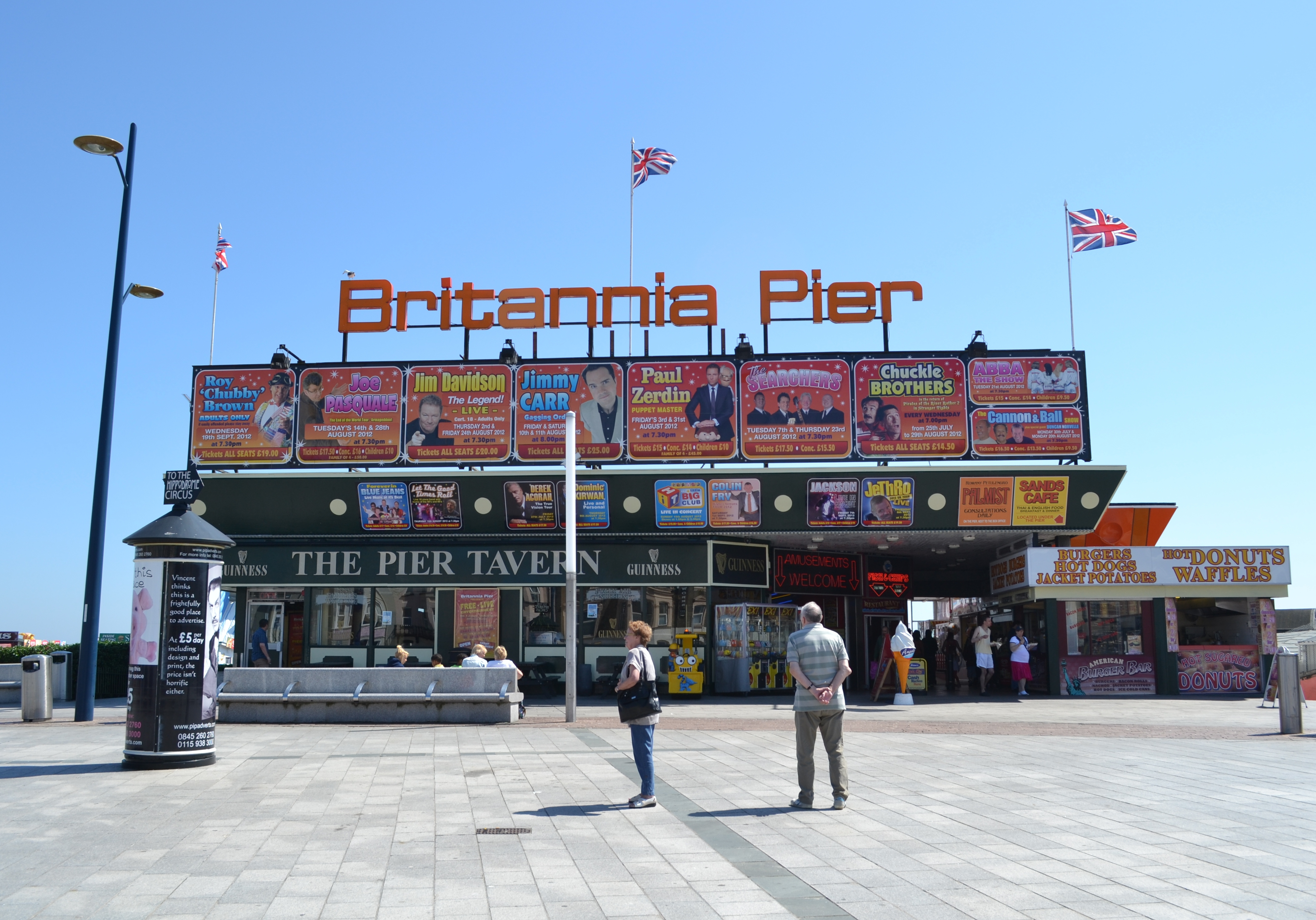
Britannia Pier, May 2012

Yarmouth has two piers: Britannia Pier (Grade II listed)) and Wellington Pier. The theatre building on the latter was demolished in 2005 and reopened in 2008 as a family entertainment centre, including a ten-pin bowling alley overlooking the beach. Britannia Pier holds the Britannia Theatre, which during the summer has featured acts such as Jim Davidson, Jethro, Basil Brush, Cannon and Ball, Chubby Brown, the Chuckle Brothers, and The Searchers. It is one of the few end-of-the-pier theatres surviving in England.

The Scroby Sands Wind Farm of thirty generators is within sight of the seafront, with its giant wind generators. Also visible are grey seals during their breeding season. The country's only full-time circus, Hippodrome Circus, is just off the seafront.

The Grade II listed Winter Gardens building sits next to the Wellington Pier. The cast iron, framed glass structure was shipped by barge from Torquay in 1903, ostensibly without the loss of a single pane of glass. Over the years, it has been used as a ballroom, roller skating rink and beer garden. In the 1990s, it was converted into a nightclub by Jim Davidson and has since been used as a family leisure venue. It is currently closed. In the meantime, it has been named by the Victorian Society as a heritage building at risk of disrepair.

Great Yarmouth's seafront, known as "The Golden Mile", attracts millions of visitors each year to its sandy beaches, indoor and outdoor attractions and amusement arcades. Great Yarmouth's Marine Parade has twelve Amusement Arcades within 2 square miles (5.2 km^{2}), including: Atlantis, The Flamingo, Circus Circus, The Golden Nugget, The Mint, Leisureland, The Majestic, The Silver Slipper, The Showboat, Magic City, Quicksilver and The Gold Rush, opened in 2007. In addition to the two piers, tourist attractions on Marine Parade include Joyland, Pirates Cove Adventure Golf, Castaway Island Adventure Golf, the Marina Centre, the Sea Life Centre, Merrivale Model Village and the Pleasure Beach and Gardens.

In August 2019, the Venetian Waterways and gardens in Great Yarmouth were reopened following a major restoration project delivered by contractor Blakedown Landscapes. Originally constructed between 1926 and 1928 as a work-creation scheme, the site features canals and formal gardens that had fallen into disrepair, with waterways silted up and infrastructure neglected. Supported by a £1.7 million grant from the Heritage Lottery Fund and assistance from volunteers, the restoration involved replanting the flowerbeds with 20,000 plants and refurbishing the original 1920s café. The café and boat hire facilities are now operated by a social enterprise.

The South Denes area is home to the Grade I listed Norfolk Naval Pillar, known locally as the Britannia Monument or Nelson's Monument. This tribute to Nelson was completed in 1819, 24 years before the completion of Nelson's Column in London. The monument, designed by William Wilkins, shows Britannia standing atop a globe holding an olive branch in her right hand and a trident in her left. There is a popular assumption in the town that the statue of Britannia was supposed to face out to sea but now faces inland due to a mistake during construction, although it is thought she is meant to face Nelson's birthplace at Burnham Thorpe. The monument was originally planned to mark Nelson's victory at the Battle of the Nile, but fundraising was not completed until after his death, and it was instead dedicated to England's greatest naval hero. It is currently surrounded by an industrial estate, but there are plans to improve the area. The Norfolk Nelson Museum on South Quay housed the Ben Burgess collection of Nelson memorabilia and was the only dedicated Nelson museum in England. It's several galleries that look at Nelson's life and personality, and at what life was like for men who sailed under him. It closed in 2019.

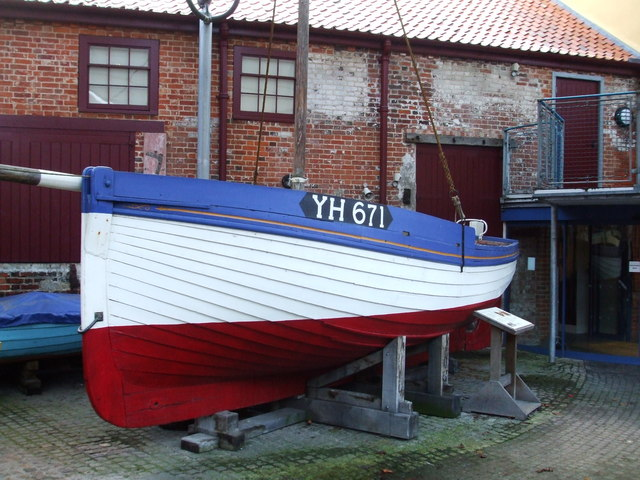
Small boat at the Time and Tide Museum

Charles Dickens used Yarmouth as a key location in his novel David Copperfield, and described the town as "the finest place in the universe". Dickens stayed at the Royal Hotel on the Marine Parade while writing the novel.

The Time and Tide Museum in Blackfriars Road, managed by Norfolk Museums Service, was nominated in the UK Museums Awards in 2005. It was built as part of a regeneration of the south of the town in 2003. Its location in an old herring smokery harks back to the town's status as a major fishing port. Sections of the historic town wall stand opposite the museum, next to the Great Yarmouth Potteries, part of which is housed in another former smokehouse. The town wall is among the most complete medieval town walls in the country, with 11 of the 18 original turrets still standing. Other museums in the town include the National Trust's Elizabethan House, the Great Yarmouth Row Houses, managed by English Heritage, and the privately owned Blitz and Pieces, based on the Home front during World War II.

The Maritime Heritage East partnership, based at the award-winning Time and Tide Museum, aims to raise the profile of maritime heritage and museum collections.

In October 2021, street artist Banksy created several murals in the town as part of his set A Great British Spraycation.

== Governance ==
There are two tiers of local government covering Great Yarmouth, at district and county level: Great Yarmouth Borough Council and Norfolk County Council, based in Norwich. The borough council meets at Great Yarmouth Town Hall in Hall Plain, which is a Grade II* listed building.

Great Yarmouth was an ancient borough. The original borough was entirely on the north side of the Yare, which formed the historic boundary between Norfolk and Suffolk. After the borough was enlarged to include Southtown in 1668, the borough straddled the two counties. The borough was reformed to become a municipal borough in 1836 under the Municipal Corporations Act 1835, at which point the boundaries were enlarged to include all of the parish of Gorleston. When elected county councils were created in 1889, Great Yarmouth was considered large enough to provide its own county-level services and so it became a county borough, independent from Norfolk County Council. For ceremonial and judicial purposes, the borough continued to straddle Norfolk and Suffolk until 1 April 1891, when the county boundary was adjusted to place the whole borough in Norfolk.

The County Borough of Great Yarmouth was abolished in 1974 under the Local Government Act 1972. The area became part of the larger Borough of Great Yarmouth, a lower-tier non-metropolitan district, with Norfolk County Council providing county-level services to the town for the first time. No successor parish was created for the area of the former county borough, which therefore became an unparished area, directly administered by Great Yarmouth Borough Council.

Great Yarmouth is a constituency represented in the House of Commons of the Parliament of the United Kingdom. Its current MP, starting 5 July 2024, is Rupert Lowe, elected for Reform UK before he left the party and established Restore Britain.

== Wildlife ==
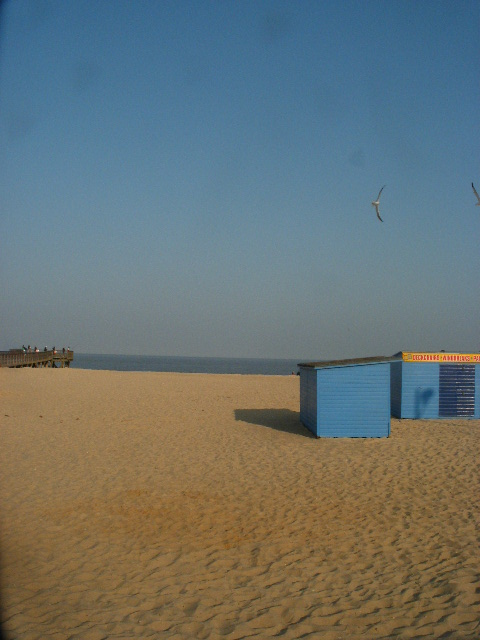
Central Beach close to the Jetty

The Yarmouth area provides habitats for some rare and unusual species. The area between the piers is home to one of the largest roosts of Mediterranean gulls in the UK. Breydon Water, just behind the town, is a major wader and waterfowl site, with winter roosts of over 100,000 birds. Grey seal and common seal are frequently seen offshore, as are seabirds such as gannet, little auk, common scoter, razorbill, Gull and guillemot.

This and the surrounding Halvergate Marshes are environmentally protected. Most of the area is now managed by conservation organisations, principally the RSPB. The North Denes area of the beach is an SSSI due to its dune plants, and supports many skylarks and meadow pipits, along with one of the largest little tern colonies in the UK each summer, and a small colony of grayling butterflies. Other butterflies found include small copper and common blue.

The nearby cemetery is a renowned temporary roost for spring and autumn migrants. Common redstart and pied flycatcher are often seen during their migration. It has also recorded the first sightings of some rare insects blown in from the continent.

== Sport and leisure ==
The main local football club is Great Yarmouth Town, known as the Bloaters, which plays in the Eastern Counties League. Its ground is at Wellesley Recreation Ground, named after Sir Arthur Wellesley, later to become the Duke of Wellington. There is a strong East Anglian rivalry with Gorleston. Local football clubs are served by the Great Yarmouth and District League.

Great Yarmouth has a horse racecourse that features a chute allowing races of one mile (1.6 km) on the straight.

Speedway racing was staged before and after the Second World War. The meetings were held at the greyhound stadium in Caister Road. The post-war team was known as the Yarmouth Bloaters, after the smoked fish. Banger and Stock car racing are also staged there.

The main Marina leisure centre, built in 1981, has a large swimming pool and conference facilities; it holds live entertainment, such as summer pantomime variety shows produced by local entertainers Hanton & Dean. The centre is run by the Great Yarmouth Sport and Leisure Trust. The Trust was set up in April 2006 to run the building as a charitable non-profit-making organisation.

At the beginning of the 2008 summer season, the world's first Segway Grand Prix was opened at the Pleasure Beach gardens.

The English Pool Association (EPA), the governing body for 8-Ball Pool in England, holds its National Finals Competitions (including Inter-County and Inter-League, singles and team competitions, and England trials) over several weekends through the year at the Vauxhall Holiday Park on the outskirts of Great Yarmouth.

== Local media ==
Local news and television programmes are provided by BBC East and ITV Anglia. Television signals is received from the Tacolneston transmitter or from one of the two local relay transmitters (Great Yarmouth and Gorleston on Sea).

The town's local radio stations are BBC Radio Norfolk on 95.1 FM, Heart East on 102.4 FM, Greatest Hits Radio Norfolk & North Suffolk (formerly The Beach) on 103.4 FM, and Harbour Radio, a community radio station that broadcasts from the town on 107.4 FM.

The Great Yarmouth Mercury is the town's weekly local newspaper, alongside the county-wide newspaper Eastern Daily Press.

== Transport ==
=== Railway ===
The Wherry Lines link Norwich and Great Yarmouth railway station, with an hourly service operated by Greater Anglia; most services travel via Acle, with the remainder via Reedham.

Before the Beeching cuts, three other railway lines entered the town:

- From the north: The Midland and Great Northern Joint Railway down the coast from Melton Constable to a terminus at Beach station;
- From the south-west: The Yarmouth-Beccles line from London Liverpool Street, via Beccles, terminating at South Town station;
- From the south: The Yarmouth-Lowestoft line from Lowestoft Central, via Hopton and Gorleston, terminating at South Town station.

The remaining Vauxhall station was renamed Great Yarmouth in 1989. It is the sole surviving station from a former total of seventeen within the borough limits.

=== Buses ===
The bus station in Great Yarmouth is the hub for local routes, located beneath Market Gates Shopping Centre. Services are operated predominantly by First Eastern Counties. The Excel X1 route, which links Norwich and Lowestoft, stops in the town. Other local bus services link the suburban areas of Martham, Hemsby, Gorleston, Bradwell and Belton.

=== Port and river ===
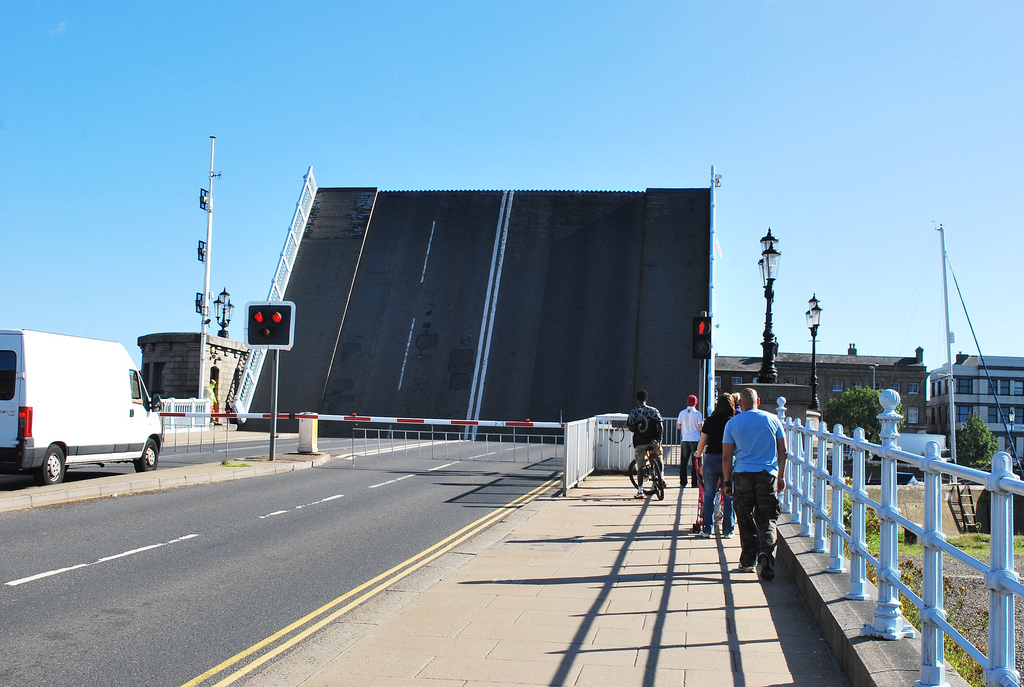
Haven Bridge; one of the three main links to the town pictured in its upright position allowing boats to pass beneath

The River Yare cuts off Great Yarmouth from other areas of the borough, such as Gorleston and Southtown; as a result, the town's bridges became major transport links. Originally, Haven Bridge was the only link over the river, but in the late 1980s, Breydon Bridge was built to take the A12 over Breydon Water, replacing the old railway bridge of Breydon Viaduct. In January 2020, construction began on a third river crossing, the Herring Bridge, which opened to traffic on 1 February 2024. All three are lifting bridges, which can be raised to allow river traffic to pass through; this can result in traffic tailbacks. The phrase "the bridge was up" has become synonymous in the town with being late for appointments.

A ferry running between the southern tip of Great Yarmouth and Gorleston provided a much shorter link between the factories on South Denes and the mostly residential areas of Gorleston. However, increased running costs and the decline of industrial activity led to its closure in the early 1990s.

Since 2006, the restored pleasure steamer the Southern Belle has offered regular river excursions from the town's Haven Bridge. Built in 1925 for the Earl of Mount Edgcumbe, she is now owned by the Great Yarmouth and Gorleston Steam Packet Company Limited.

Construction work on the Great Yarmouth Outer Harbour, a deep-water harbour on the North Sea, began in June 2007 and was completed by 2009. Originally, there was to be a roll-on/roll-off ferry link with Ĳmuiden, which failed to materialise. An initiative by Seamax Ferries to connect Great Yarmouth and Ijmuiden by ferry was due to start in 2008. Nor did installation of two large cranes in 2009, since removed, save plans for a container terminal, which have also been scrapped.

==== Lifeboat station ====
There has been a lifeboat at Great Yarmouth since at least 1802. Early boats were privately operated until the RNLI took over in 1857. It has a lifeboat station at Riverside Road, Gorleston (Note: 52°34′32″N 1°43′55″E / 52.575419°N 1.732039°E) from where the Trent-class lifeboat Samarbeta and B class (inshore) lifeboat Seahorse IV run.

==== Roadstead ====
The anchorage off Yarmouth, known as Yarmouth Roads, was seen as one of the East Coast's best in the early 1800s. Their fleets gathered and set sail during the Napoleonic wars. Nowadays, the roadstead is more likely to be referred to as an anchorage.

=== Roads ===
The town is served by the A47 and the terminating A143. Until 2017, the A12 from London terminated in Yarmouth; the route from Lowestoft was renumbered as the A47 by Highways England, as part of a wider road-improvement scheme. Thereafter, the A12 has terminated in Lowestoft instead of at Vauxhall roundabout. The relief road was built along the path of the old railway to carry the A12 onwards to Lowestoft and London. Roundabouts, junctions and bridges often become gridlocked at rush hour.

==== Third river crossing ====
Plans were advanced for a third river crossing in Great Yarmouth to link northern Gorleston with the South Denes and the Outer Harbour, avoiding the congested town centre. A public consultation took place in mid-2009 over four possible proposals, but plans were stalled by a lack of funding and closure of the container terminal. In 2016, additional funding of just over £1 million was pledged and a potential crossing proposal outlined for the crossing to link the A12 at Harfrey's Roundabout to South Denes. The bridge project was approved in 2020 construction of the bascule bridge, to be named "Herring Bridge" began in January 2021, and was set to end in May 2023. During construction works, an unexploded German bomb from the Second World War was discovered and exploded during defusing attempts. The bridge opened to road traffic on 1 February 2024.

=== Air ===
The North Denes Heliport, sited in the north of the town, is operated by CHC Helicopter. In 2011, the heliport's closure was announced, with operations moving to Norwich International Airport, but this has never occurred.

== First Responder group ==
An East of England Ambulance Service First Responder group has been set up for the Great Yarmouth area. Made up of a group of volunteers within the community in which they live or work, they are trained to attend emergency 999 calls by the NHS Ambulance Service.

== Enterprise zone ==
Great Yarmouth and Lowestoft Enterprise Zone was launched in April 2012. Its sites include Beacon Park and South Denes in Great Yarmouth.

== Notable people ==
=== Medieval ===
- Joan Larke (c. 1490 – after 1529), mistress of Cardinal Thomas Wolsey and mother of his two illegitimate children

=== 16th century ===
- Sir John Clere (c. 1511–1557) politician and naval commander
- William Harborne (c. 1542–1617) diplomat, merchant and Ambassador to the Ottoman Empire
- Edward Owner (1576–1650) politician who sat in the House of Commons at times between 1621 and 1648
- Sir John Potts, 1st Baronet (c. 1592–1673) politician who sat in the House of Commons from 1640 to 1648 and in 1660.

=== 17th century ===
- William Bridge (c. 1600–1670), prominent English independent minister
- Thomas Goodwin (1600–1680) Puritan theologian and preacher, chaplain to Oliver Cromwell
- Joseph Ames (1619–1695) naval commander under the Commonwealth of England
- Rebecca Nurse (1621–1692), sister of Mary Eastey and a victim of the Salem witch trials, was born in Great Yarmouth.
- Mary Eastey (1634–92), victim of the Salem witch trials, was born in Great Yarmouth.
- John Clipperton (1676–1722) of Clipperton Island, privateer who fought against the Spanish
- Sir William Gooch, 1st Baronet (1681–1751) Governor of Virginia from 1727 to 1749
- Joseph Ames (1689–1759) bibliographer and antiquary

=== 18th century ===
- Henry Swinden (1716–1772), antiquary, schoolmaster and land surveyor
- James Sayers (1748–1823), caricaturist
- John Ives (1751–1776), antiquary and officer of arms at the College of Arms in London
- Dr Thomas Girdlestone (1758–1822), English physician and writer
- Captain George William Manby (1765–1854), barrack-master and inventor of marine life-saving equipment and the fire extinguisher
- Mary Dawson Turner (1774–1850), artist and illustrator
- Dawson Turner (1775–1858), banker, botanist and antiquary
- Captain John Black (1778–1802), son of a clergyman, ship's officer and privateer
- William Fisher (1780–1852) officer of the Royal Navy and a novelist
- Robert Miles Sloman (1783–1867), British-German shipbuilder
- Robert Gooch (1784–1830), physician
- William Hovell (1786–1875), explorer of Australia
- James Beeching (1788–1858), local shipbuilder, whose firm survived into the 20th century
- Sarah Martin (1791–1843), prison visitor and philanthropist
- Sir George James Turner (1798–1867), barrister, politician and judge, Lord Justice of Appeal in Chancery
- Henry Stebbing (1799–1883), cleric, man of letters, poet, preacher and historian

=== 19th century ===
- Robert McCormick (1800–1890) Royal Navy ship's surgeon, explorer and naturalist.
- Samuel Laman Blanchard (1804–1845) author and journalist
- Charles John Palmer (1805–1888) lawyer and historian of Great Yarmouth
- John Cantiloe Joy and William Joy (1805–1859 and 1803–1865) marine artists and members of the Norwich School of painters
- James Allen Ransome (1806–1875) agricultural engineer and writer on agriculture
- Sir Edmund Lacon (1807–1888) Conservative politician who sat in the House of Commons between 1852 and 1885
- Sir George Edward Paget (1809–1892) physician and academic
- John Bell (1811–1895) sculptor
- Sir James Paget (1814–1899), Victorian surgeon, after whom the James Paget University Hospital was named
- Anna Sewell (1820–1878), author of Black Beauty, was born and spent the early part of her life in Great Yarmouth.
- James Haylett (1825–1907) noted lifeboatman
- Thomas Vaughan (active in 1827), bodysnatcher.
- Emma Maria Pearson (1828–1893) writer, one of the first British women nurses in the Red Cross
- Willoughby Smith (1828–1891) electrical engineer, discovered the photoconductivity of the element selenium
- Colonel Sir Robert William Edis (1839–1927) architect
- Charles Burton Barber (1845–1894) painter, notably of children and pets
- Sir G. A. H. Branson (1871–1951), barrister and High Court judge, grandfather of Richard Branson.
- General Sir Thomas Astley Cubitt (1871–1939) Army officer and Governor of Bermuda
- Oliver Fellows Tomkins (1873–1901) missionary, eaten by cannibals in Papua
- Reginald Edwards (1881–1925), cricketer
- Captain Cuthbert Orde (1888–1968) war artist, who portrayed many RAF fighter pilots
- Bandsman Jack Blake (John Blake) (1890–1960) boxer, who became British middleweight champion in 1916
- Joseph Henry Woodger (1894–1981) theoretical biologist and philosopher of biology

=== 20th century ===
- Naomi Lewis (1911–2009) poet, essayist, critic and children's storyteller
- Jack Cardiff (1914–2009), Oscar-winning cinematographer
- Peter Cadbury (1918–2006) founder of Westward Television
- Peter Shore (1924–2001), Labour MP and cabinet minister
- Bob Grigg (1924–2002) aerospace engineer, chief designer of British Aerospace 146
- Gerald Hawkins (1928–2003) astronomer and author working on archaeoastronomy
- Sir Kenneth MacMillan (1929–1992), choreographer with the Royal Ballet, Covent Garden
- Richard Larn (born 1931) RN Chief Petty Officer, businessman and maritime historian
- John McDonnell (born 1951, in Liverpool), Labour Party politician and MP, attended Great Yarmouth Grammar School, having moved to Great Yarmouth at a young age.
- Tony Wright (born 1954) Labour Party politician and MP for Great Yarmouth 1997–2010
- Keith Chapman (born 1959) children's television writer and producer, creator of Bob the Builder and PAW Patrol
- Dale Vince (born 1961) sustainable energy industrialist and New Age traveller
- Jason Statham (born 1967) actor, lived in Great Yarmouth in childhood and attended the local grammar school.
- Matthew Macfadyen (born 1974) actor born in Great Yarmouth
- Travis Kerschen (born 1982) independent film actor
- Myleene Klass (born 1978) British musician, singer, television presenter and model.

=== 21st century ===
- Georgie Aldous (born 1998) British social activist, model and influencer

== Twin towns ==
Great Yarmouth has been twinned with Rambouillet, France since 1956.

== Climate ==
Climate data for Hemsby, (Note: Weather station is located 6.0 miles (9.7 km) from the Great Yarmouth town centre.) (1991–2020 normals, extremes 1978–2001)
Month	Jan	Feb	Mar	Apr	May	Jun	Jul	Aug	Sep	Oct	Nov	Dec	Year
Record high °C (°F)	14.0 (57.2)	16.7 (62.1)	21.1 (70.0)	23.8 (74.8)	26.2 (79.2)	31.5 (88.7)	31.9 (89.4)	31.2 (88.2)	26.8 (80.2)	24.8 (76.6)	17.9 (64.2)	15.5 (59.9)	31.9 (89.4)
Mean daily maximum °C (°F)	7.4 (45.3)	7.8 (46.0)	9.9 (49.8)	12.7 (54.9)	15.6 (60.1)	18.6 (65.5)	20.8 (69.4)	21.1 (70.0)	18.6 (65.5)	14.8 (58.6)	10.7 (51.3)	8.0 (46.4)	13.9 (57.0)
Daily mean °C (°F)	4.9 (40.8)	5.0 (41.0)	6.7 (44.1)	9.1 (48.4)	12.0 (53.6)	14.8 (58.6)	17.0 (62.6)	17.2 (63.0)	15.1 (59.2)	11.7 (53.1)	7.9 (46.2)	5.5 (41.9)	10.6 (51.0)
Mean daily minimum °C (°F)	2.3 (36.1)	2.2 (36.0)	3.4 (38.1)	5.5 (41.9)	8.4 (47.1)	10.9 (51.6)	13.1 (55.6)	13.2 (55.8)	11.6 (52.9)	8.6 (47.5)	5.0 (41.0)	2.9 (37.2)	7.3 (45.1)
Record low °C (°F)	−14.1 (6.6)	−9.1 (15.6)	−4.3 (24.3)	−1.9 (28.6)	−1.5 (29.3)	2.5 (36.5)	5.6 (42.1)	5.6 (42.1)	1.3 (34.3)	−3.0 (26.6)	−4.7 (23.5)	−7.9 (17.8)	−14.1 (6.6)
Average precipitation mm (inches)	50.5 (1.99)	43.9 (1.73)	42.6 (1.68)	32.0 (1.26)	43.3 (1.70)	53.7 (2.11)	61.6 (2.43)	68.8 (2.71)	52.7 (2.07)	65.4 (2.57)	70.0 (2.76)	62.6 (2.46)	647.3 (25.48)
Average precipitation days (≥ 1.0 mm)	11.0	9.9	8.9	8.3	7.7	8.9	8.9	9.2	8.7	10.9	12.3	12.0	116.6
Mean monthly sunshine hours	65.7	84.5	127.2	189.7	226.2	225.3	228.7	211.9	153.0	114.4	76.9	59.7	1,763.1
Source 1: Met Office
Source 2: Starlings Roost Weather

== See also ==
- Lydia Eva, the last surviving steam drifter of the Great Yarmouth herring fishing fleet
- "Yarmouth Town", a traditional sea shanty set in the town
