= Grade II* listed buildings in Great Yarmouth =

There are over 20,000 Grade II* listed buildings in England. This page is a list of these buildings in the district of Great Yarmouth in Norfolk.

== Great Yarmouth ==
Name	Location	Type	Completed (Note: The date given is the date used by Historic England as significant for the initial building or that of an important part in the structure's description.)	Date designated	Grid ref. (Note: The grid reference is based on the British national grid reference system, sometimes known as OSGB36, used by the Ordnance Survey.) Geo-coordinates	Entry number (Note: The "List Entry Number" is a unique number assigned to each listed building and scheduled monument by Historic England.)	Image
Wiseman's Mill	Ashby with Oby, Great Yarmouth	Drainage Mill	Built 1753	4 December 1987	TG4092613793; 52°40′06″N 1°33′43″E	1051014	Wiseman's Mill More images
Belton Old Hall	Belton with Browston	House	Early 18th century	27 November 1954	TG4828802623; 52°33′53″N 1°39′43″E	1372933	Upload Photo
Browston Hall Hotel	Browston Green, Belton with Browston	House	Late 17th century	27 November 1954	TG4997401772; 52°33′23″N 1°41′11″E	1051001	Browston Hall Hotel More images
Church of All Saints	Belton with Browston	Parish Church	1866	27 November 1954	TG4855502949; 52°34′03″N 1°39′59″E	1372932	Church of All Saints More images
Church of St Nicholas	Bradwell	Parish Church	12th century	27 November 1954	TG5031503855; 52°34′29″N 1°41′34″E	1051006	Church of St Nicholas More images
Church of St Peter and St Paul	Burgh Castle	Parish Church	Late 11th century	27 November 1954	TG4764004973; 52°35′10″N 1°39′15″E	1051008	Church of St Peter and St Paul More images
Church of Holy Trinity	Caister-on-Sea	Parish Church	13th century	4 March 1947	TG5199612278; 52°38′59″N 1°43′26″E	1287563	Church of Holy Trinity More images
Church of All Saints	Filby	Parish Church	14th century	25 September 1962	TG4690113224; 52°39′38″N 1°38′58″E	1287564	Church of All Saints More images
Church of St Margaret	Burgh St Margaret, Fleggburgh	Parish Church	12th century	25 September 1962	TG4449414010; 52°40′07″N 1°36′53″E	1372907	Church of St Margaret More images
Church of St Peter	Clippesby, Fleggburgh	Parish Church	c. 1200	25 September 1962	TG4284614588; 52°40′28″N 1°35′27″E	1051017	Church of St Peter More images
Church of St Edmund	Fritton and St. Olaves	Parish Church	12th century	27 November 1954	TG4732700143; 52°32′35″N 1°38′46″E	1372918	Church of St Edmund More images
Drainage Pump	St Olave's Marsh, Fritton and St. Olaves	Drainage Mill	1910	27 November 1954	TM4568499713; 52°32′23″N 1°37′18″E	1372904	Drainage Pump More images
Fritton Old Hall	Fritton and St. Olaves	House/Restaurant	c. 1540	27 November 1954	TG4760300145; 52°32′34″N 1°39′01″E	1305105	Fritton Old Hall
Barn at Home Farm	Hemsby	Aisled Barn	Early 17th century	4 March 1947	TG4915917271; 52°41′45″N 1°41′09″E	1287567	Upload Photo
Church of St Margaret	Hopton-on-Sea	Parish Church	1866-67	27 November 1954	TG5241500040; 52°32′23″N 1°43′15″E	1050972	Church of St Margaret More images
Old St Margaret's Church	Hopton-on-Sea	Parish Church (ruined)	Late 13th century	27 November 1954	TM5301799972; 52°32′20″N 1°43′47″E	1050970	Old St Margaret's Church More images
Church of St Mary	Thrigby, Mautby	Parish Church	First half 14th century	25 September 1962	TG4605312393; 52°39′12″N 1°38′11″E	1152375	Church of St Mary More images
Church of St Peter and St Paul	Runham, Mautby	Church	Mid 14th century	25 September 1962	TG4597410827; 52°38′22″N 1°38′03″E	1050977	Church of St Peter and St Paul More images
Church of St Peter and St Paul	Mautby	Parish Church	Late 12th century	25 September 1962	TG4807012377; 52°39′08″N 1°39′58″E	1152350	Church of St Peter and St Paul More images
Church of St Margaret	Ormesby St. Margaret with Scratby	Parish Church	14th century	25 September 1962	TG4988714532; 52°40′15″N 1°41′41″E	1227867	Church of St Margaret More images
Ormesby Old Hall	Ormesby St. Margaret with Scratby	House	Mid 17th century	20 February 1952	TG5003814501; 52°40′14″N 1°41′49″E	1287569	Ormesby Old Hall
Church of St Michael	Ormesby St. Michael	Parish Church	13th century	25 September 1962	TG4807514883; 52°40′29″N 1°40′05″E	1287570	Church of St Michael More images
Church of St Peter and St Paul	Repps with Bastwick	Parish Church	12th century	25 September 1962	TG4219016927; 52°41′45″N 1°34′58″E	1051024	Church of St Peter and St Paul More images
Potter Heigham Bridge	Repps with Bastwick	Road Bridge	14th century	16 April 1955	TG4199818473; 52°42′35″N 1°34′52″E	1305009	Potter Heigham Bridge More images
Church of St George	Rollesby	Parish Church	12th century	25 September 1962	TG4461915759; 52°41′03″N 1°37′04″E	1152526	Church of St George More images
Burnley Hall	East Somerton, Somerton	House	Early 18th century	20 February 1952	TG4787819756; 52°43′07″N 1°40′08″E	1216607	Burnley Hall More images
Church of St Mary	West Somerton, Somerton	Parish Church	c. 1200	25 September 1962	TG4754919547; 52°43′01″N 1°39′50″E	1216608	Church of St Mary More images
Church of St Andrew	Stokesby with Herringby	Parish Church	13th century	25 September 1962	TG4359210568; 52°38′17″N 1°35′56″E	1152707	Church of St Andrew More images
Church of St Edmund	Thurne	Parish Church	Late 13th century	25 September 1962	TG4051015613; 52°41′05″N 1°33′25″E	1304567	Church of St Edmund More images
Thurne Dyke Windpump	Thurne	Drainage Mill	1820	7 December 1962	TG4005315918; 52°41′16″N 1°33′02″E	1050999	Thurne Dyke Windpump More images
Caister Hall	West Caister	Castle	19th century	4 December 1987	TG5042012218; 52°38′59″N 1°42′03″E	1228031	Caister Hall More images
Church of St Andrew	Southtown and Gorleston	Parish Church	13th century	27 June 1953	TG5244704408; 52°34′44″N 1°43′29″E	1096807	Church of St Andrew More images
Church of St Mary including Church Rooms and Surrounding Wall	Regent Rd, Great Yarmouth	Roman Catholic Church	1848-1850	9 December 1976	TG5289607634; 52°36′27″N 1°44′01″E	1245910	Church of St Mary including Church Rooms and Surrounding Wall More images
Church of St Nicholas	Great Yarmouth	Parish Church	1101-1119	27 June 1953	TG5243508036; 52°36′41″N 1°43′38″E	1096813	Church of St Nicholas More images
Church of St Peter	Southtown and Gorleston	Catholic Church	1938-1939	5 August 1974	TG5262904123; 52°34′34″N 1°43′38″E	1246581	Church of St Peter More images
Custom House	Great Yarmouth	Merchants House	1720	5 August 1974	TG5240607236; 52°36′15″N 1°43′34″E	1245800	Custom House More images
Great Yarmouth Potteries	Great Yarmouth	Fish curing works	19th century	9 December 1976	TG5272706909; 52°36′04″N 1°43′50″E	1245561	Great Yarmouth Potteries
Old Merchants House	Great Yarmouth	Merchants House	Early 17th century	27 June 1953	TG5246207142; 52°36′12″N 1°43′37″E	1245917	Old Merchants House More images
Old White Lion Public House	Great Yarmouth	Public House	Early 17th century	27 June 1953	TG5263507081; 52°36′10″N 1°43′46″E	1271278	Old White Lion Public House More images
St Nicholas Hospital Main Block	Great Yarmouth	Hospital	1818	5 August 1974	TG5289006400; 52°35′47″N 1°43′58″E	1245983	St Nicholas Hospital Main Block More images
St Nicholas Hospital Main Entrance Range	Great Yarmouth	Entrance	1811	5 August 1974	TG5284006464; 52°35′50″N 1°43′55″E	1245984	St Nicholas Hospital Main Entrance Range
The Hippodrome	Great Yarmouth	Circus (recreational)	1903	8 December 1978	TG5304807119; 52°36′10″N 1°44′08″E	1245922	The Hippodrome More images
The Winter Gardens	Great Yarmouth	Glasshouse	1878-1881	5 August 1974	TG5314806762; 52°35′59″N 1°44′12″E	1271608	The Winter Gardens More images
Town Hall	Great Yarmouth	Magistrates Court	Until 1990	5 August 1974	TG5231307426; 52°36′21″N 1°43′30″E	1246969	Town Hall More images
Vicarage	Great Yarmouth	Vicarage	Early 17th century	27 June 1953	TG5243907977; 52°36′39″N 1°43′38″E	1096809	Vicarage More images
25 South Quay	Great Yarmouth	House	1644	27 June 1953	TG5243807190; 52°36′14″N 1°43′36″E	1245803	25 South Quay More images
