= Mundesley RNLI Lifeboat Station =

Former RNLI lifeboat station in Norfolk, England

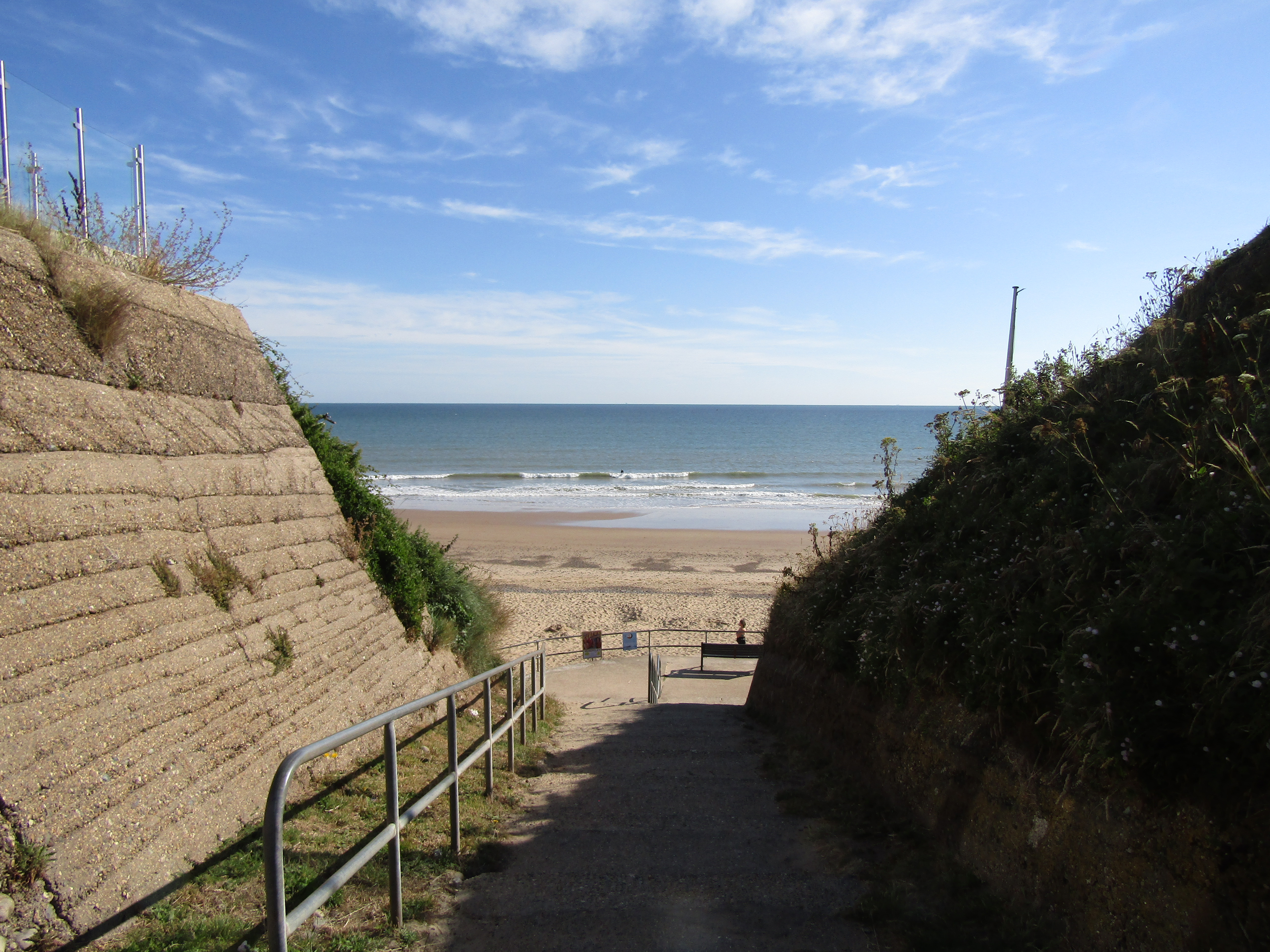
- Mundesley Beach

- Mundesley, Norfolk

General information
- Status: Closed
- Type: RNLI Lifeboat Station
- Location: Mundesley, Norfolk, England
- Coordinates: 52°52′36.7″N 1°26′26.8″E
- Opened: CLC 1811; NSA 1823; RNLI 1857
- Closed: 1895

Mundesley RNLI Lifeboat Station was located in Mundesley, a village approximately 7 miles (11 km) south-east of Cromer, on the north-east coast of Norfolk.

A lifeboat was first stationed at Mundesley by the 'Cromer Lifeboat Committee' (CLC) in 1811, control passing over to the 'Norfolk Association for Saving the Lives of Shipwrecked Mariners' (NSA) in 1823. Management of the station was transferred to the Royal National Lifeboat Institution (RNLI) in 1857.

Mundesley RNLI Lifeboat Station closed temporarily in 1891, and permanently in 1895.

77 years later, a lifeboat service was established once again at Mundesley. The independently run Mundesley Volunteer Inshore Lifeboat was established in 1972. For information of the current service, please see:

- Mundesley Volunteer Inshore Lifeboat

== History ==
On 2 November 1810, the brig Anna (Anne) of North Shields, was wrecked at Mundesley. All eight crew, and a woman and child, were lost.

The meeting of the Cromer Lifeboat Committee was reported just 15 days later, when they resolved to place a lifeboat at Mundesley, smaller than the one at Cromer, as long as local funding could be raised. It was later decided to adapt a beach-boat as a temporary lifeboat. In a letter of 14 October 1811 to the Lifeboat Committee, it was recorded that six 6 lives had been saved by the Mundesley lifeboat on the previous day.

In 1823, the station and lifeboat were adopted by the newly formed NSA, and a new 29-foot lifeboat, built by Robson of North Shields, was placed on station.

The sloop Union of Kingston-upon-Hull, on passage to Great Yarmouth, was wrecked on 19 February 1832, at Mundesley. In gale-force conditions, the Master and crew were rescued by a group of fishermen and coastguard in the Mundesley lifeboat, led by Lt. Wylde, RN.

Following a meeting of the NSA on 21 Nov 1857, it was agreed to request that the RNLI take over responsibility for all their lifeboat stations, including Mundesley. This was formally agreed at a meeting of the RNLI committee of management on 3 December 1857.

A new 30-foot self-righting 'Pulling and Sailing' (P&S) lifeboat, one with sails and (10) oars, was constructed by Forrestt of Limehouse, to the design of Peake, at a cost of £156. It was dispatched to Mundesley in 1858, and was the seventh lifeboat to be placed on the Norfolk coast, following the transfer of the management of the NSA stations.

Following a sum of £435 received from the 'Grocers of England', via William Reed of The Grocer journal, the Mundesley station was completely renovated. A new lifeboat house was constructed, and a new 33-foot lifeboat, Grocers, was placed on station in November 1866, along with new equipment and a new carriage. The lifeboat was given free transportation from London to Norwich by the Great Eastern Railway, from where it was hauled on its carriage to Mundesley.

On 17 November 1867, the brig George of Sunderland was on passage to Rouen, when she ran aground on the outer bank, out of reach of the rocket brigade lines. The Mundesley lifeboat Grocers was launched into the south-east gale, but the brig broke up in less than an hour, and six men drowned when the main mast fell. One man was spotted clinging to a plank. Fully clothed, lifeboat man Juniper jumped overboard with a line, and rescued the sole survivor. William Juniper was awarded the RNLI Silver Medal.

After 16 years service, the Mundesley lifeboat was replaced in 1882. A new 34-foot self-righting lifeboat, along with its new carriage, was transported from London to North Walsham free of charge by the Great Eastern Railway. On 21 September, a service of blessing was carried out by the Rev. Nevison Loraine of St Paul's, Chiswick. The village choir sang the hymn, "For those in peril on the sea". Funded by the gift to the Institution of £1000, from Mrs Elliott of Leytonstone, Essex, in memory of her late husband, the lifeboat was named J. H. Elliott (ON 261). The lifeboat was then launched, into rough conditions, which gave a good demonstration of her capabilities.

The J. H. Elliott was launched at 05:30 on 28 November 1884, to the barque Embla of Stavanger, on passage from Cardiff to Christianssund with a cargo of timber, when she stranded 1 mile (1.6 km) from Mundesley in thick fog. The vessel was soon a total wreck, but all 10 crew were rescued, and were ashore by 09:30.

At a meeting of the RNLI committee of management on Thursday 8 January 1891, it was resolved to temporarily close Mundesley Lifeboat Station, as there were insufficient numbers of reliable crew available.

On 10 January 1895, at a meeting of the RNLI committee of management, it was decided that Mundesley RNLI Lifeboat Station would be abolished.

It is not known if any part of the old station building still exists. The lifeboat on station at the time of closure, J. H. Elliott (ON 261), was sold from service. No further details are known.

The independently run Mundesley Volunteer Inshore Lifeboat, established in 1972, now operates at Mundesley.

== Station honours ==
The following are awards made at Mundesley.

- RNLI Silver Medal

William Juniper, crew member – 1868

== Mundesley lifeboats ==
ON (Note: ON is the RNLI's Official Number of the boat.)	Name	Built	On station	Class	Comments
–	Unnamed	1811	1811−????	North Country	(Note: North Country non-self-righting lifeboat, funded from local subscription, with a donation from Lloyd's of London, built in Sunderland.)
Pre-064	Unnamed	1823	1823−1859	29-foot 6in non-self-righting	(Note: 26-foot x 9-foot 4in (10-oared) non-self-righting lifeboat, built by Robson of North Shields, costing £130.)
Pre-325	Unnamed	1858	1858−1866	30-foot Self-righting Peake (P&S)	(Note: 30-foot x 7-foot 6in (10-oared) Peake-class self-righting (P&S) lifeboat, from RNLI funds, built by Forrestt of Limehouse, London, costing £186.)
Pre-456	Grocers	1866	1866−1882	33-foot Peake Self-righting (P&S)	(Note: 33-foot x 8-foot 4in (10-oared) Peake-class self-righting (P&S) lifeboat, gift of the 'Grocers and Oil Trade Review', built by Woolfe of Shadwell, London, costing £290.)
261	J. H. Elliott	1882	1882−1895	34-foot Self-righting (P&S)	(Note: 34-foot x 8-foot 3in (10-oared) self-righting (P&S) lifeboat, gift of Mrs J. H. Elliott of Leytonstone, built by Woolfe of Shadwell, London, costing £364.)

Station Closed, 1895
Pre ON numbers are unofficial numbers used by the Lifeboat Enthusiast Society to reference early lifeboats not included on the official RNLI list.

== See also ==
- Independent lifeboats in Britain and Ireland
- List of RNLI stations
- List of former RNLI stations
- Royal National Lifeboat Institution lifeboats
