= Burgh Common and Muckfleet Marshes =

UK Site of Special Scientific Interest

Coordinates: 52.657°N 1.606°E

- Site of Special Scientific Interest
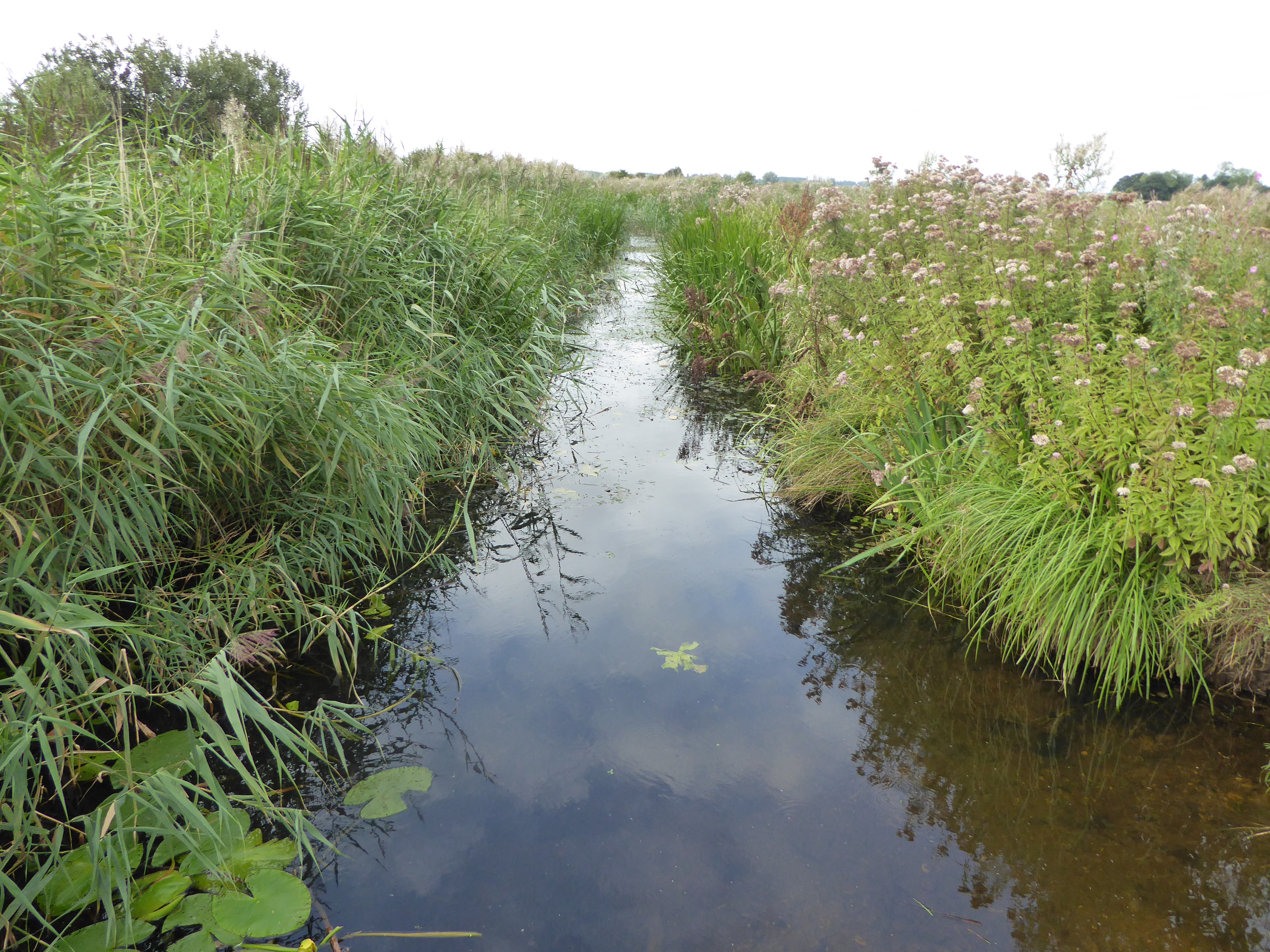
- Muck Fleet in Muckfleet Marshes
- Location of Burgh Common and Muckfleet Marshes.
- Area of search: Norfolk
- Grid reference: TG 440 127
- Interest: Biological
- Area: 121.5 hectares (300 acres)
- Notification date: 1986
- Location map: Magic Map

Burgh Common and Muckfleet Marshes is a 121.5-hectare (300-acre) biological Site of Special Scientific Interest south of Fleggburgh in Norfolk, England. It is part of the Broadland Ramsar site and Special Protection Area, and The Broads Special Area of Conservation.

The Muck Fleet, a tributary of the River Bure, runs through this wetland site, which is traditionally managed by grazing and mowing. Habitats include tall fen, fen meadows and drainage dykes. There are rare plants and invertebrates, such as the swallowtail butterfly and the freshwater snail Anisus vorticulus.

The site is private land but a public footpath goes through it.
