= Grand Hotel, Mundesley =

Grand Hotel
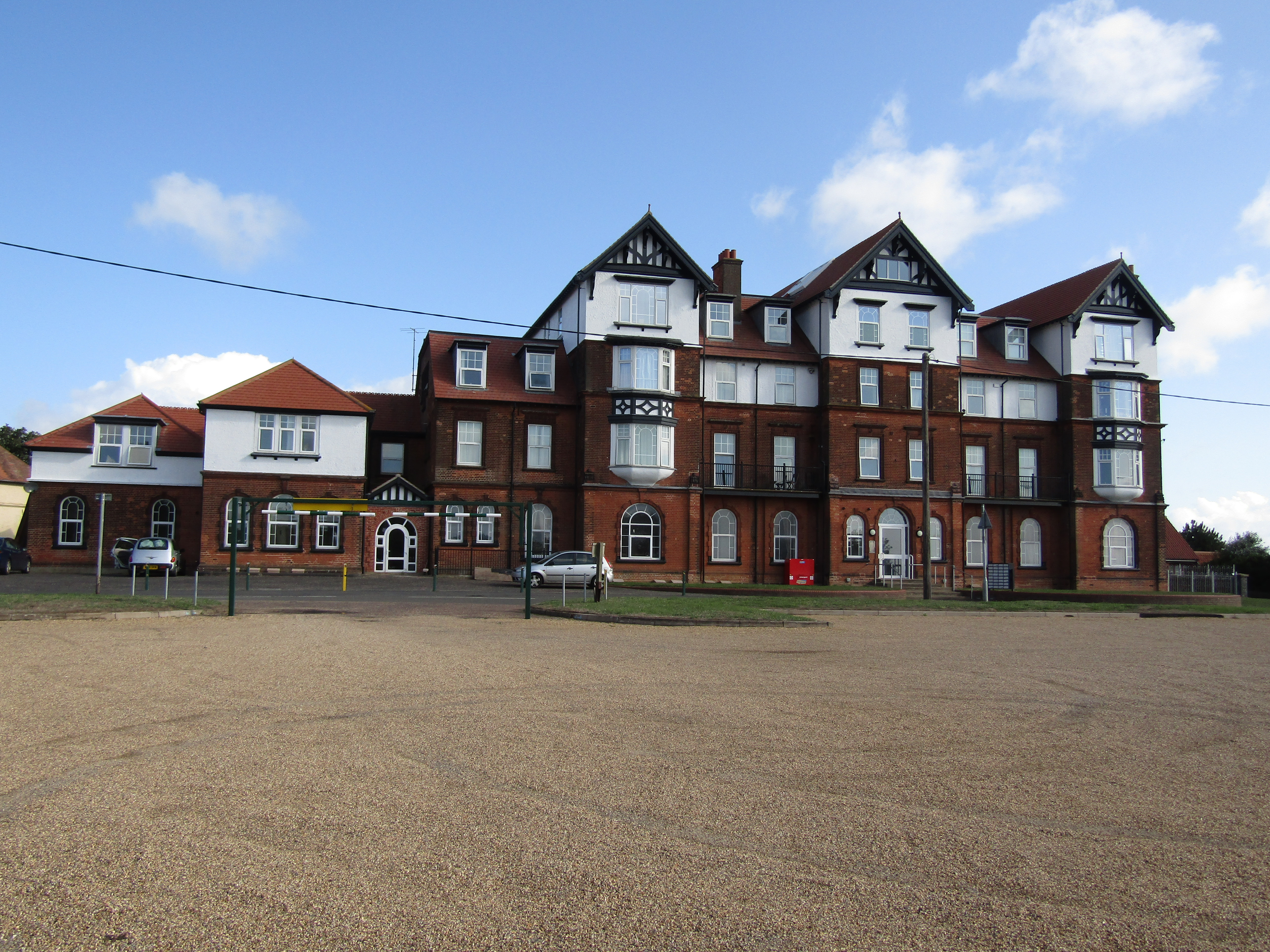
- South facing Elevation of the former Hotel

- Norfolk
- Alternative names: Continental Hotel

General information
- Status: Refurbished
- Type: Hotel
- Architectural style: Victorian
- Location: Mundesley, North Norfolk, Norfolk, England, Beach Road; Mundesley-on-sea; Norfolk
- Coordinates: 52°52′50.93″N 1°25′50.93″E
- Opening: 1897
- Owner: London Land Securities

The Grand Hotel is a former hotel which still stands in the English coastal village of Mundesley in the county of Norfolk, United Kingdom. The building is now called the Grand Norfolk Holiday Apartments.

== Location ==
The defunct hotel is situated on the B1159 main coast road that runs from Cromer to Caister-on-Sea. The building stands on a cliff top highpoint in the village and is a dominant landmark.

== History ==
This Victorian hotel was built in 1897 along with the Manor Hotel in Mundesley in the effort to develop into a fashionable seaside resort at the time that nearby Cromer had grown into prominence as a resort. With the arrival of the railway to Mundesley, a development company was set up to instigate the expansion of Mundesley. This company was called The East Coast Estates Company. The Grand Hotel was to offer luxury accommodation to the Victorian traveller, most of whom were expected to arrive by train at the village's brand new railway station.

=== Commandeered ===
During the Second World War, like many hotels along this part of the coast, the hotel was commandeered for military use. At the end of the war it was returned to private use. The hotel was renamed the Hotel Continental.

=== End of an era ===
Following the war years, the closure of the railway station, the decline of the area as a fashionable tourist destination and the availability of cheap package holidays abroad, the hotel closed it doors. The hotel was then converted into apartments and became Trafalgar Court. With a complex ownership structure and legal disputes over management funding, the building fell into disrepair. After an injection of money the building has undergone extensive refurbishment.
