= John Bond Pearce =

English architect (bapt. 1843 – 1903)

John Bond Pearce (bapt. 25 January 1843 – 9 March 1903) was an English architect from Norwich, Norfolk. His architectural practice was in Surrey Street, Norwich. His son Neville Bond Pearce was also a noted architect. Pearce designed many of his building in the Victorian Gothic architectural style, a good example being the town hall in Great Yarmouth opened in 1882.

== List of Works ==
- The Royal Hotel (1840), 4 Marine Parade, Great Yarmouth.
- The Agricultural Hall (1882), renamed Anglia House, Prince of Wales Road, Norwich
- Great Yarmouth Town Hall (1882), Hall Quay, Great Yarmouth
- Manor Hotel (1900), Mundesley, Norfolk
- Alms Houses at East Bilney, Norfolk
- Catholic Chapel (1874) at Norwich Cemetery, Bowthorpe Road.
- Christ Church, Church Avenue, Norwich (1879)
- Buxton Parish Church, Norfolk, extensively restored (1881–2)
- Church of St. Peter & St. Paul, Griston, Norfolk

== Gallery ==
Buildings and structures of J B Pearce

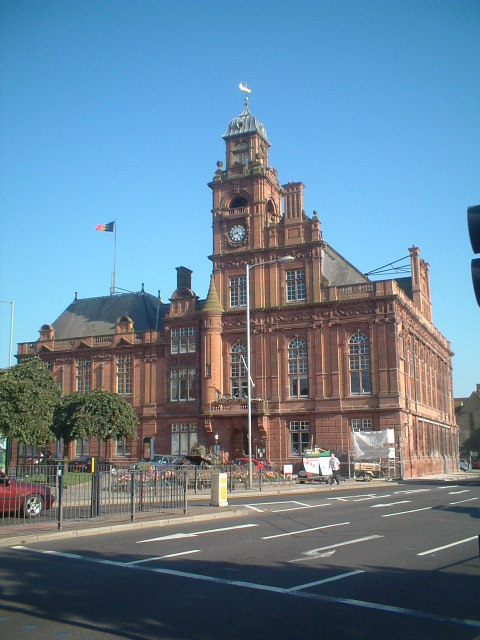
Great Yarmouth Town Hall, Hall Quay

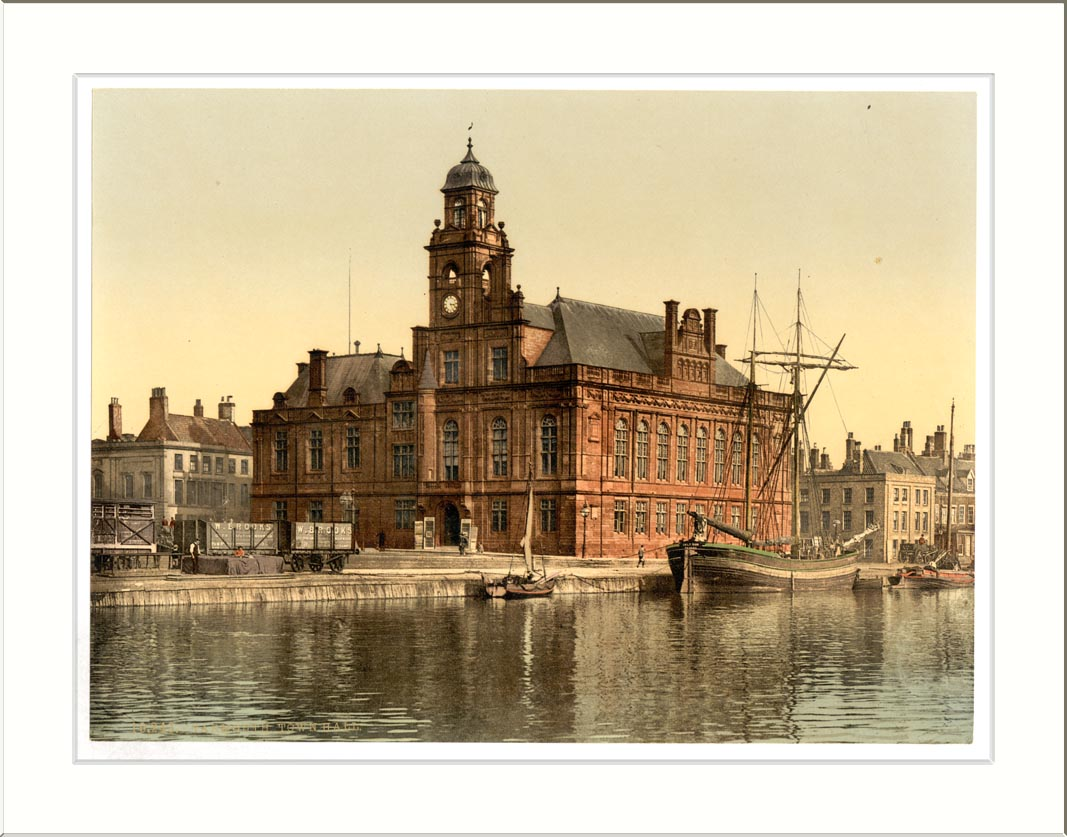
Great Yarmouth Town Hall, Hall Quay

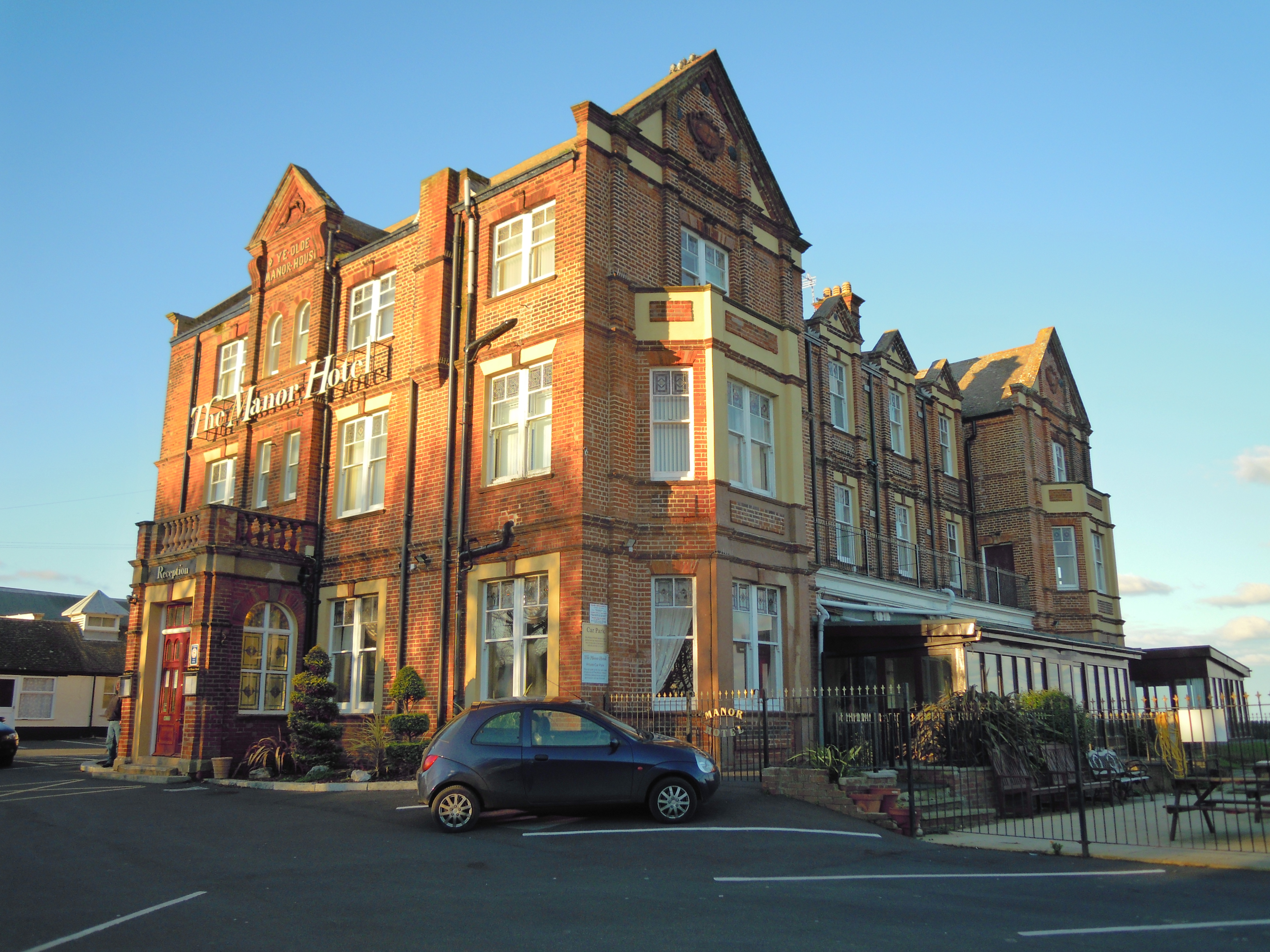
Manor Hotel, Mundesley, Norfolk

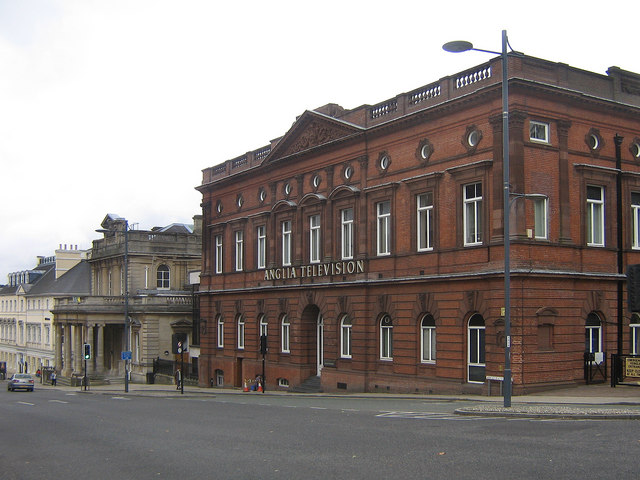
The Agricultural Hall, Prince of Wales Road, Norwich

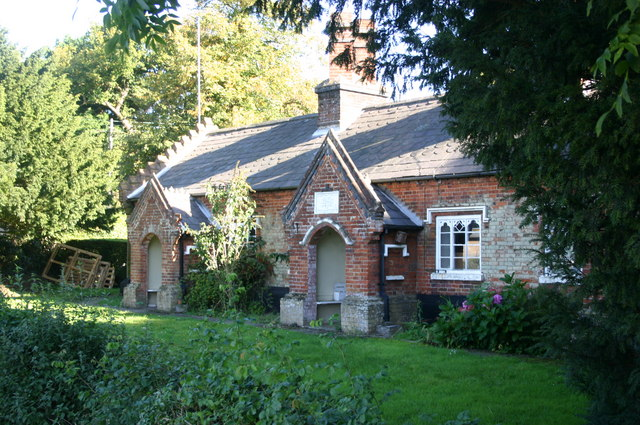
Alms Houses at East Bilney, Norfolk

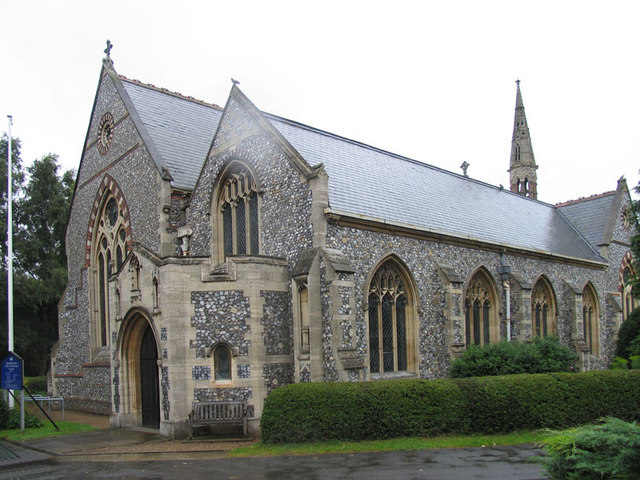
Christ Church, Church Avenue, Norwich
