= Manor Hotel, Mundesley =

Hotel in Mundesley-on-sea, Norfolk, England

Manor Hotel
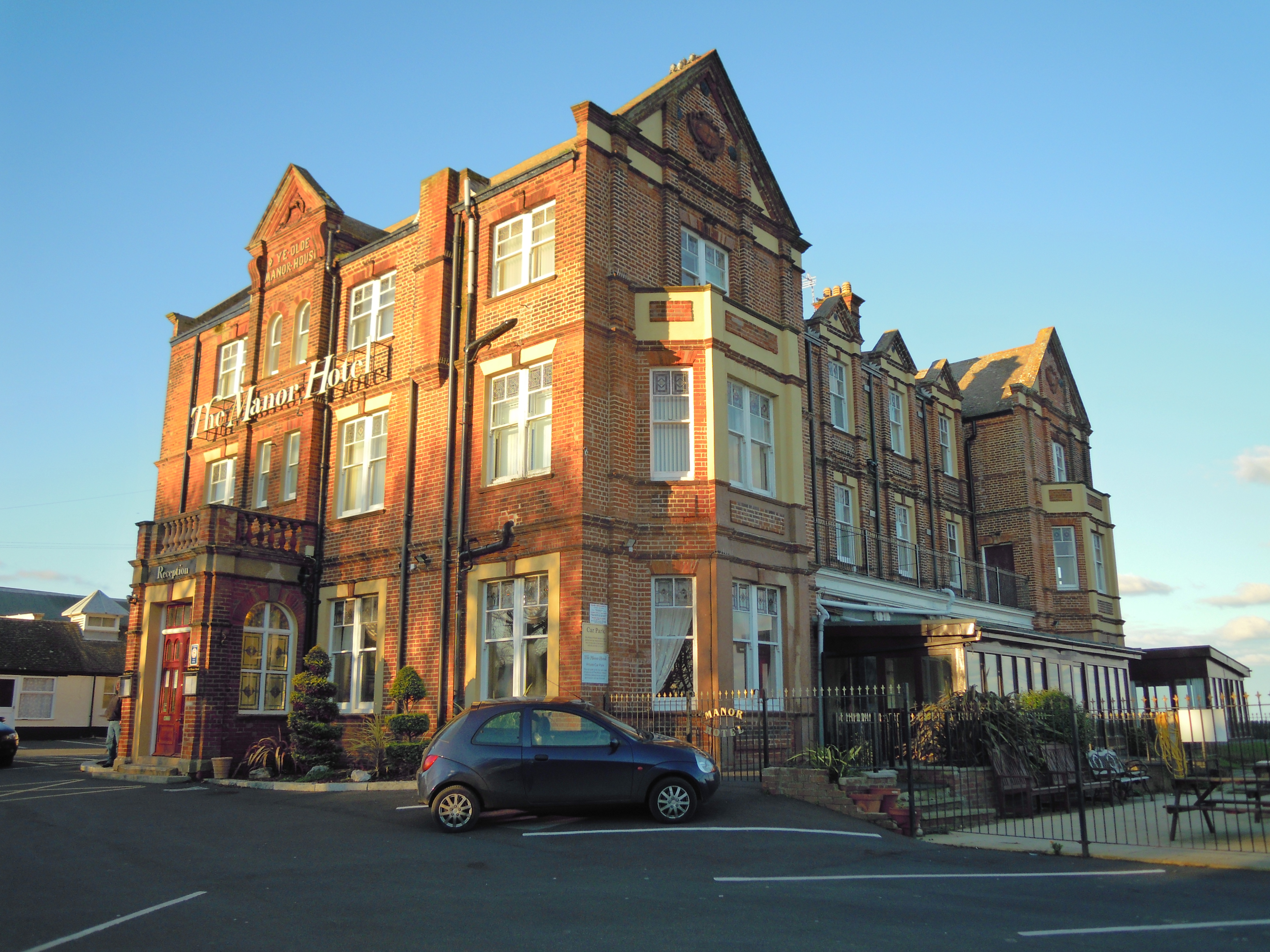

- Norfolk

General information
- Location: Mundesley, North Norfolk, Norfolk, England, 7 Beach Road; Mundesley-on-sea; Norfolk; NR11 8BG
- Coordinates: 52°52′43.68″N 1°26′10.60″E
- Opening: 1900

Design and construction
- Architect: J B Pearce
- Developer: Bullard & Sons of Norwich

Other information
- Number of rooms: 26 en suite bedrooms
- Number of restaurants: 1
- Parking: yes

Website
- Hotel website

The Manor Hotel is a Victorian hotel in the seaside town of Mundesley-on-sea in the county of Norfolk, United Kingdom. It lies on the beachfront of Mundesley, north of Gold Park and just east of the Methodist Church. The hotel was designed by the Norwich architect John Bond Pearce and was inaugurated in 1900. It was the second major hotel to be established in the town, after the Hotel Continental, which was built in 1892.

In April 2012, the hotel was put back on the market for sale, just a month after it was repossessed by its owner Terry Burch. Burch put the hotel up for sale for £845,000 after he had reached his initial turnover for the 4 years of owning the premises. In doing so he cancelled five weddings which had been organized at the hotel.

== Overview ==
It is an ornate Victorian building which sits atop the Mundesley cliffs with a sea view. The hotel was originally a manor house, later converted into a hotel. It has a six-bay front, with four-centred arches, and a hipped roof with four polygonal shafts. The rooms of the red-brick edifice were "recently updated" as of 2012. The hotel had a reported 25 rooms in 1982, but now has 30 rooms.

== Restaurant ==
Sarah Brealey, food critic of the Norwich Evening News, said that those wanting to eat in Mundesley are "almost spoilt for choice". She stated that one of the most popular attractions is the Sunday carvery, which has a choice of four meats which consists of Beef, Turkey, Gammon and Pork, and said that the restaurant's vegetables were "almost too numerous to recount". She also noted its vegetarian dishes such as local goats’ cheese and sundried tomato tart.
