= All Saints' Church, Billockby =

Church of All Saints, Billockby
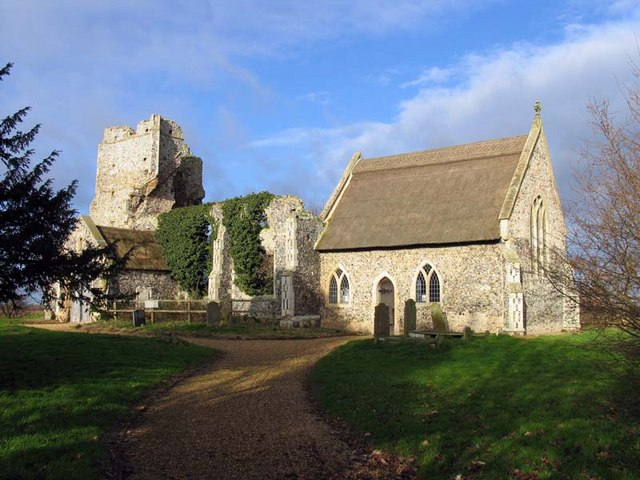
- The church in 2007
- Church of All Saints, Billockby
- 52°39′56″N 1°35′31″E
- OS grid reference: TG 430 136
- Location: Near Fleggburgh, Norfolk
- Country: England
- Denomination: Church of England

Architecture
- Heritage designation: Grade II
- Designated: 25 September 1962
- Style: Perpendicular

Administration
- Diocese: Diocese of Norwich

All Saints' Church is an Anglican church, partly ruined, near the villages of Billockby and Fleggburgh, Norfolk, England. It is a Grade II listed building.

== History and description ==
The church dates from the 15th century. The roof of the nave collapsed in a storm on 15 July 1762; the nave and tower, of Perpendicular style, is in ruins. The nave is of knapped flint, and has large windows with remains of tracery.

The chancel is known to have been in use in 1762. It was restored in 1872. It is of flint with ashlar dressings, and has a thatched roof; the interior includes an octagonal 15th-century font. Services are held occasionally.
