= Ashby with Oby =

Civil parish in Norfolk, England

Coordinates: 52.677°N 1.568°E

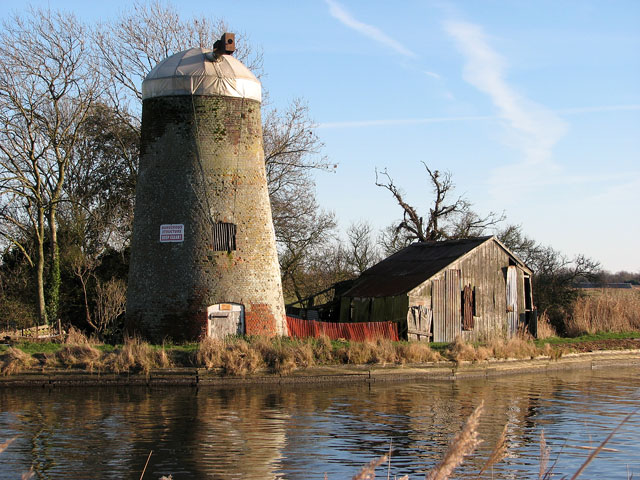
- Wiseman's Mill, Oby

- Location within Norfolk
- Area: 5.72 km^{2} (2.21 sq mi)
- OS grid reference: TG413148
- District: Great Yarmouth
- Shire county: Norfolk
- Region: East
- Country: England
- Sovereign state: United Kingdom
- Post town: GREAT YARMOUTH
- Postcode district: NR29
- Police: Norfolk
- Fire: Norfolk
- Ambulance: East of England

Ashby with Oby is a civil parish in the English county of Norfolk, which is around 3 miles (4.8 km) north of Acle and 9 miles (14 km) north-west of Great Yarmouth. It named for the deserted mediaeval villages of Ashby and Oby, with their lost churches.

== Geography ==
The civil parish has an area of 5.72 square kilometres (2 sq mi), part of which is in The Broads National Park. The River Bure forms the western boundary, beyond which is the parish of Upton with Fishley although there is no crossing point. The other neighbouring parishes are Thurne to the north-west, Repps with Bastwick to the north, Rollesby to the north-east and Clippesby to the east.

The parish is almost all farmland, with a few small areas of woodland and a flat topography. The farmland is mostly arable, with some large fields, but the southern portion is drained marshland. This has smaller fields separated by drainage ditches, which in Norfolk are called dikes. Many of these are still meadows, under permanent grass.

There is no nucleated settlement, but only a scatter of farmsteads. The B1152 Acle to Martham road runs through the east side of the parish and is its link to the outside world; the rest of the parish is served by a small network of narrow country lanes, leading off this and connecting to Thurne and Repps only.

In the 2001 census, the parish had a population of 69 in 28 households. At the 2011 Census the population of the parish remained at less than 100, and was included in the total for the civil parish of Thurne.

== History ==
A group of eight ring ditches in the north of the parish have been interpreted as a ploughed-out Bronze Age round barrow cemetery. Back then, the area was part of an island -the Isle of Flegg, which was surrounded by shallow sea and salt marsh.

Cropmarks indicating a possible Roman farmstead were identified in 2007, and metal detecting has recovered Roman coins on the site which is next to the old salt marsh boundary.

The substantial Anglo-Saxon villages of Ashby and Oby were listed in the Domesday Book of 1086 as Ascheby and Obei, and were in the West Flegg Hundred. . Ashby was a large village for the time, with 23.8 households. Its overlord was St Benet's Abbey just up the river, and one of the tenants-in-chief was the bishop of Norfolk who was still based in Thetford in 1086. Oby was larger, with 31.3 households, and in 1086 was mostly held by Roger Bigod of Norfolk except for lands owned by the abbey.

King Canute had donated these landholdings to the abbey, which retained possession until the Dissolution when they passed to the Bishop of Norwich.

Walter Suffield, bishop of Norwich (died 1257) gave permission for the Lord of the manor of Ashby, William de Sparham, to have a private chapel in his own house with its own priest. This was the present Ashby Hall, although nothing mediaeval survives there. The village was located between this and the church, which was on Thurne Road to the south-east.

Both villages failed and were deserted in unknown circumstances in the later Middle Ages. Oby church was abandoned in the second half of the 16th century, and demolished. In 1604, the parishes of Ashby, Oby and Thurne were united into one ecclesiastical parish with the two townships of Ashby-and-Oby and Thurne. However the church at Ashby remained in use as a chapel of ease, with its graveyard, and confusion later arose about which of the two churches had been which.

Ashby church was intact in around 1740, when the Norfolk antiquarian Francis Blomefield visited and left a brief description which he had published in 1810. In 1790, there was a land transaction which involved the churchyard being given into secular ownership, William Faden published a map of Norfolk in 1797, which also indicated that the church was out of use by then. In 1854, ruins were still visible. In 1882 there was an archaeological excavation, by which time only a portion of churchyard wall left above ground. The site subsequently became a ploughed field. It is unusual for a Norfolk church extant in the 18th century to vanish completely in this way, indicating that a predatory landlord was involved.

In 1820, the consolidated parish of Thurne with Ashby and Oby was subject to Enclosure. An ancient area of common land attached to Asbby was lost, and the poor people of the township were compensated with the income from 3 acres (1.2 ha) which was fetching £6 in the 1850s (£600 in 2021 values). The vanished common is remembered by Heath Farm and Heath Road.

== Governance ==
For the purposes of local government, the parish falls within the district of Great Yarmouth. In 1988 the Oby part of the parish came under the aegis of the Broads Authority while Ashby did not, thus re-establishing a boundary which had been abolished in 1604.

The township of Ashby and Oby became a civil parish under the Local Government Act 1894, part of East and West Flegg Rural District'. The latter rural district proved too small to be viable, and was united with Blofield Rural District in 1935 to create Blofield and East and West Rural District. This in turn was abolished in 1974, and the parish incorporated into Great Yarmouth.

== Amenities ==
The only public amenity consists of a post box at the west end of Boundary Road, opposite the entrance to Harrison's Farm Lane.

The footpath running along the bank of the River Bure is part of the Weavers' Way long-distance footpath. Two short canals, called ‘’dikes’’ but not simply drainage ditches, run off the river and originally gave boat access to farmsteads. The northern one is on the parish boundary, and served Boundary House Farm which is now part of a caravan park. The southern one is called Oby Dike or South Oby Dike. These provide commercial mooring for boats.

== Lost churches ==
=== Oby church ===
Oby church was abandoned in the second half of the 16th century, and demolished. The latest reference to its being in use dates from 1552. It was located at Oby Manor Farm, where there is a 17th-century barn which is now single-storey with a modern roof but which has apparently been cut down from a taller building. The interior south wall has fragments of carved stonework including chamfers, and the exterior south wall has re-used ashlar stonework. This was salvage from the demolished church. The actual site of the church in relation to the farm buildings is unknown.

=== Ashby church ===
The church at Ashby was dedicated to St Mary the Virgin. (This causes confusion with the church at Ashby St Mary.) It was located on the north side of the Thurne Road and east of Repps Road, just east of a clump of trees which itself is east of a bungalow. The site is now a ploughed field, and there is nothing to see.

The 1976 drought allowed cropmarks to be photographed which outlined the foundations of the lost church. These revealed two, otherwise unknown, phases of building. The first one involved a single nave with an apsidal chancel and a round tower, resembling the 12th century church at Hales. Later in the Middle Ages, the chancel was substantially extended to form a three-bay square-ended and buttressed structure as wide as the nave. The latter was extended to the west over the demolished round tower, and a new square tower was built. A south porch was provided.

The archaeological investigation in 1822 traced a nave wall for 90 feet (27 metres), and the west wall for 30 feet (9 metres). Also traced were the foundations of a square west tower, with diagonal corner buttresses. An area of black and yellow floor tiling, laid in a zig-zag pattern "similar to those used in Martham church, only smaller" was uncovered.

The Norfolk antiquarian Francis Blomefield visited in about 1740 when the church was still standing, and left a brief description which did not include architectural details. He mentioned three grave-slabs and two tombs in the chancel, another grave-slab apparently in the nave, and the font. The font had a carved escutcheon displaying an orle and martlets.

== Windmills ==
There are two windmills in Ashby with Oby.

Clippesby Windmill is a drainage mill in Ashby. It was converted to a basic weekend retreat in 1958, retaining most of its machinery.

Wiseman's mill is a drainage mill in Oby, which was also a sawmill. Built in 1753, it worked until 1933. The mill has been conserved.
