= Mundesley Volunteer Inshore Lifeboat =

Independent lifeboat service in Norfolk, England

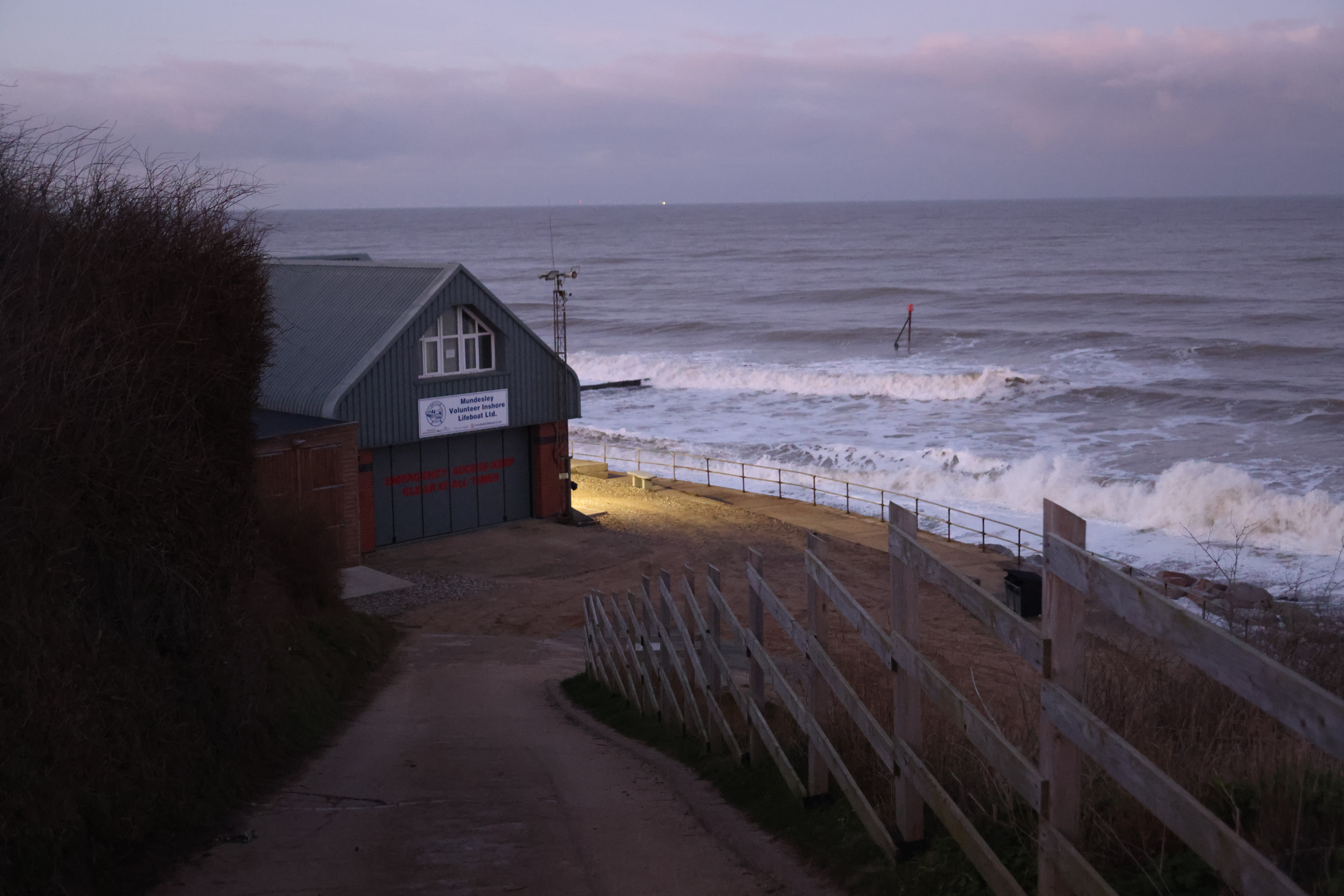
- Mundesley Lifeboat Station

- Location within Norfolk

General information
- Type: Lifeboat Station
- Location: Mundesley, Norfolk, England
- Coordinates: 52°52′34.6″N 1°26′29.3″E
- Opened: 1972
- Owner: Mundesley Volunteer Inshore Lifeboat Service

Technical details
- Material: Fabricated steelwork, Brickwork and concrete

Mundesley Volunteer Inshore Lifeboat is a volunteer-run lifeboat station located in Mundesley, a village approximately 20 mi (32 km) north-west of Norwich, overlooking the North Sea on the north-east coast of the English county of Norfolk.

A lifeboat was first stationed at Mundesley by the 'Cromer Lifeboat Committee' (CLC) in 1811, control passing to the 'Norfolk Association for Saving the Lives of Shipwrecked Mariners' (NSA) in 1823, and the Royal National Lifeboat Institution (RNLI) in 1857, operating until 1895.

An Independent lifeboat service was re-established at Mundesley in 1972. The station currently operates an Inshore lifeboat, Edna Claxton, on station since 2022.

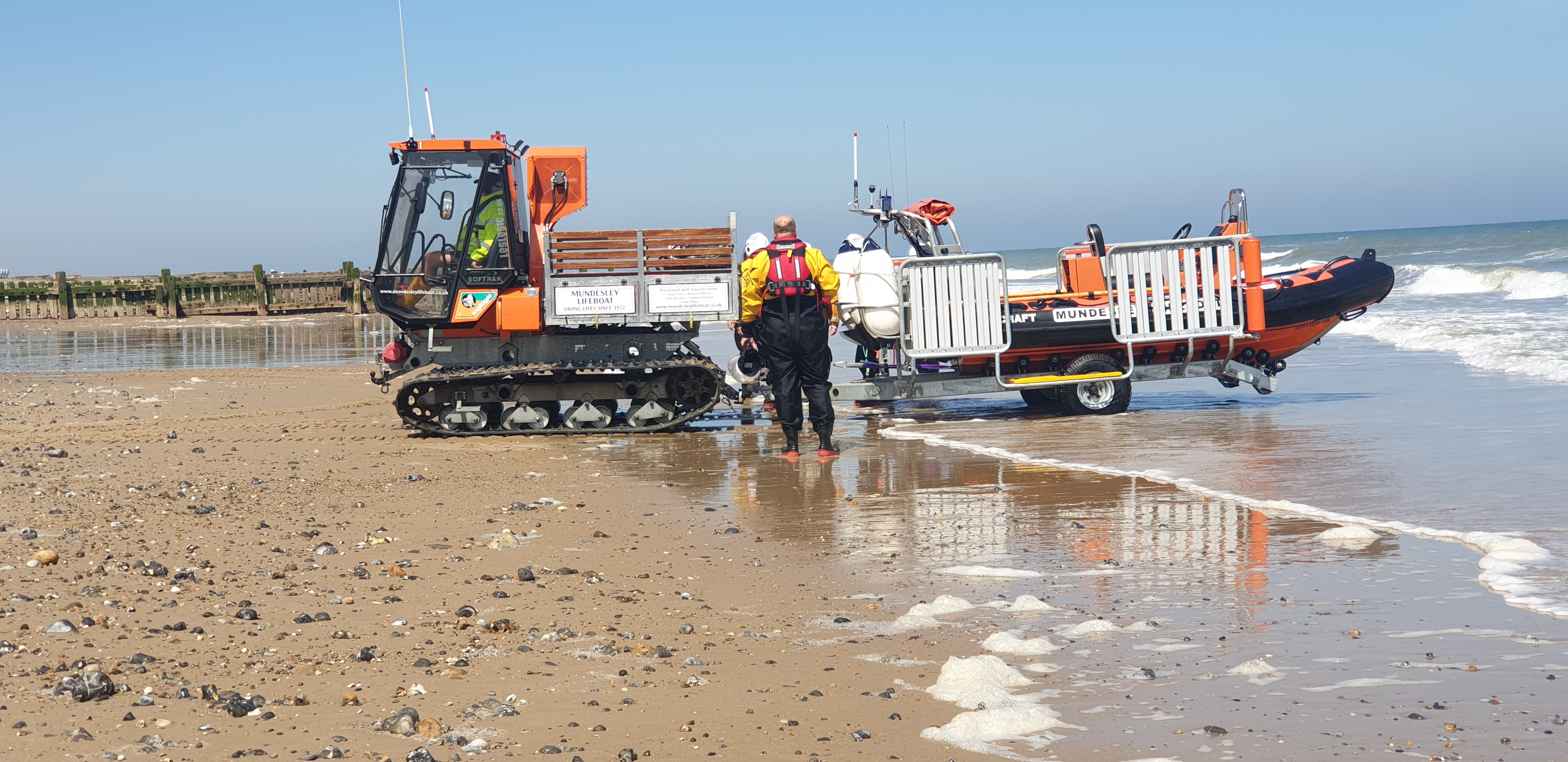
Mundesley lifeboat practice, 2025

Mundesley Volunteer Inshore Lifeboat is a registered charity (No. 266406), has 'Declared Facility' status with H.M. Coastguard, and is a member of the National Independent Lifeboats Association (NILA).

== History ==
The first lifeboat was placed at Mundesley in 1811 by the Cromer Lifeboat Committee, following the wreck of the brig Anna (Anne), with the loss of eight crew, and a woman and child.

Management of the station transferred to the Norfolk Association for Saving the Lives of Shipwrecked Mariners' (NSA) in 1823, and then onto the RNLI in 1857. In 1891, the station closed temporarily due to the lack of an available crew, ultimately closing permanently in 1895.

Between 1858 and 1895, the lifeboats had launched 17 times, saving 40 lives. The RNLI Silver Medal had been awarded to crew member William Juniper in 1868, for jumping into the surf from the lifeboat, and saving the sole survivor of the brig George of Sunderland.

For more information on the RNLI lifeboat station at Mundesley, please see:–

- Mundesley RNLI Lifeboat Station

== Independent service ==
In 1971, a man and wife were sailing their dinghy when it capsized 1/2 mi (0.80 km) off Mundesley. The woman, who was wearing their only life-jacket, survived, but the man drowned as he attempted to swim ashore. A meeting was called by the parish council to discuss the feasibility of establishing an Inshore lifeboat at Mundesley. It was decided to contact the RNLI and Coastguard, to ask for help in setting up a service. Their response was that they would be unable to help due to commitments to other stations in the area, Mundesley being just seven miles away from existing lifeboat stations at Cromer to the north, and Happisburgh to the south.

Undeterred by this response, the council decided they would set up an Independent rescue service. This service would be funded and staffed from within the village. As a result of a series of meetings held by the council "The Mundesley Volunteer Inshore Lifeboat Service Ltd." was established.

The organization was to be a Limited Company and registered charity. A board of directors was duly elected, who were chosen from a broad section of the local community, including proposed crew members. The volunteer crew would take care of the day-to-day running of the boat and the station, whilst the directors would take care of the policy making, fund-raising and financial arrangements.

=== Service commences ===
By the spring of 1972 the organization was ready to start its service. A Zodiac inflatable was acquired to use as the lifeboat which had been borrowed from a local businessman. This lifeboat was housed in a temporary boathouse on the promenade, at the east end of the village. Throughout the summer of 1972, an extensive fund raising campaign was initiated, which resulted in the purchase of a 4 m (13 ft) Avon Sea Rider semi-rigid inflatable, which was wholly owned by the new service. Contractors at the nearby Bacton Gas Terminal donated a wooden site hut, which was converted into a boathouse.

== Boathouse ==
On 11 June 1980, the new brick-built boathouse, with crew room and lookout, was formally opened by Commander P. Warrington of HM Coastguard. Local firms had donated £2,000 worth of materials. With the exception of the brickwork, the station was constructed entirely by the 16 lifeboat crew, and cost just a further £2,200 to complete.

== New station ==
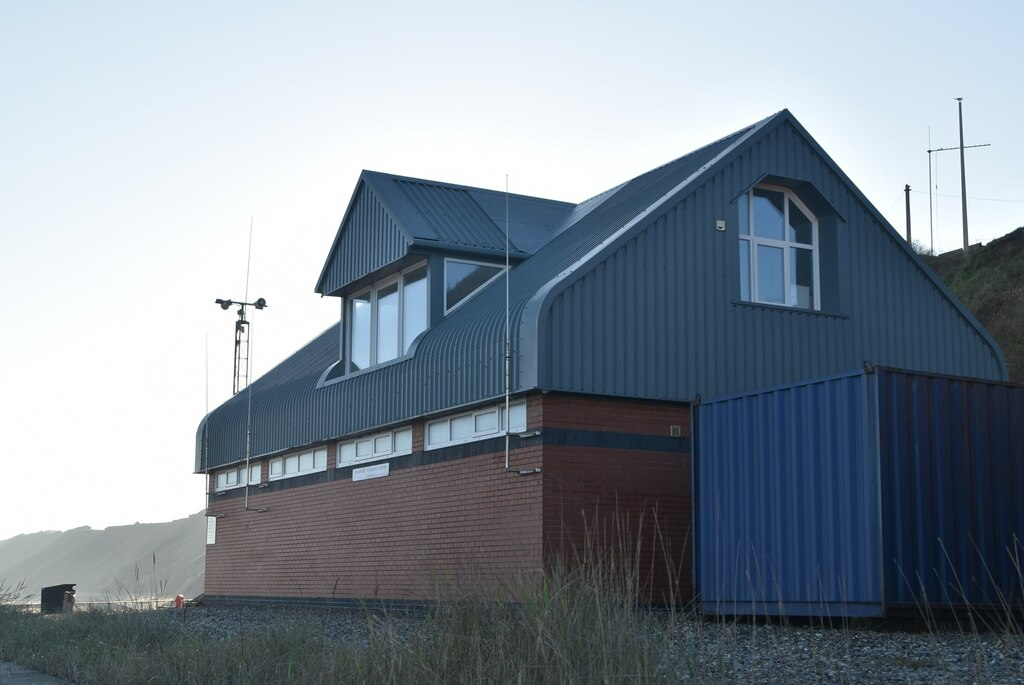
2006 Mundesley Lifeboat Station

A new lifeboat station was built in 2006, funded entirely by public donation. The new station is a steel-framed building with block and brick curtain walling. The roof is constructed from insulated steel cladding. The interior consists of a main boat hall, housing the boat and the tractor sitting side by side ready for service. Also on the ground floor is the drying room, which holds all of the crew's personal protection equipment such as drysuits, helmets and life-jackets. This room is constantly kept warm and damp free, to prolong the life of the valuable kit.

The first floor consists of four main rooms. The lookout is situated on the eastern elevation so that almost the whole of the Mundesley guard is visible. Also kept in this room are charts of the coast and two VHF radios, so constant communications can be kept with the boat whilst it is out at sea. A second room is used as a crew training and meeting room. Crew training sessions are usually held fortnightly on a Monday night. Two further rooms on the first floor are the Coxswain's office and the Kitchen.

== Stability ==
Since those early days, the Service has gone from strength to strength, and has taken part in the rescue of some 100 people in trouble. The lifeboat is called out to service by a pager system which is activated by HM Coastguard from their Humber Maritime Rescue Coordination Centre. The lifeboat works closely with both inshore and offshore lifeboat stations in the area. Coastguard helicopters covering the area are based at Humberside Airport, and at Manston Airport in Kent. All the crew members are volunteers who are trained in all aspects of search and rescue work, boat handling, first aid, and navigation. The volunteers undertake training all year round. There are lifeboat crew on duty at the station every Sunday and bank holiday during the summer months.

== Mundesley lifeboats ==
In 2004, Mundesley Inshore Lifeboat received a new lifeboat. The boat was a 4.5 m (15 ft) semi-rigid inflatable boat. She was fitted out by Goodchild Marine of Burgh Castle, on a Tornado RIB platform, and named Footprints. The boat is powered by a 60 brake horsepower (45 kW) Mercury outboard engine, giving a maximum speed of 28 knots (32 mph; 52 km/h).

Footprint was replaced in 2012, with another 4.5m semi-RIB, named Bob Page.

On 10 July 2022, a service of dedication and naming ceremony was held for the latest Mundesley lifeboat. Named Edna Claxton after a generous local benefactor, the lifeboat was fitted out by Goodchild Marine on a Ribcraft platform. The lifeboat was then returned to the manufacturer for sea-trials, before entering service later in the year.

Name	On station	Class	Engine	Comments
–	1972−????	Avon SeaRider 4.0m Semi-RIB		
–	1991−1997	Avon SeaRider 4.0m Semi-RIB	50-hp Yamaha	
Mollie Tidman	1997−2004	Tornado		
Footprints	2004−2012	Tornado / Goodchild Marine 4.5m Semi-RIB	60-hp Mercury	
Bob Page	2012−2022	Tornado / Goodchild Marine 4.5m Semi-RIB	60-hp Mariner	
Edna Claxton	2022−	Ribcraft / Goodchild Marine 4.5m Semi-RIB	60-hp Mariner	

== See also ==
- Independent lifeboats in Britain and Ireland
- List of former RNLI stations
- List of RNLI stations
