= Winter Gardens, Great Yarmouth =

Building in Great Yarmouth, England

Winter Gardens
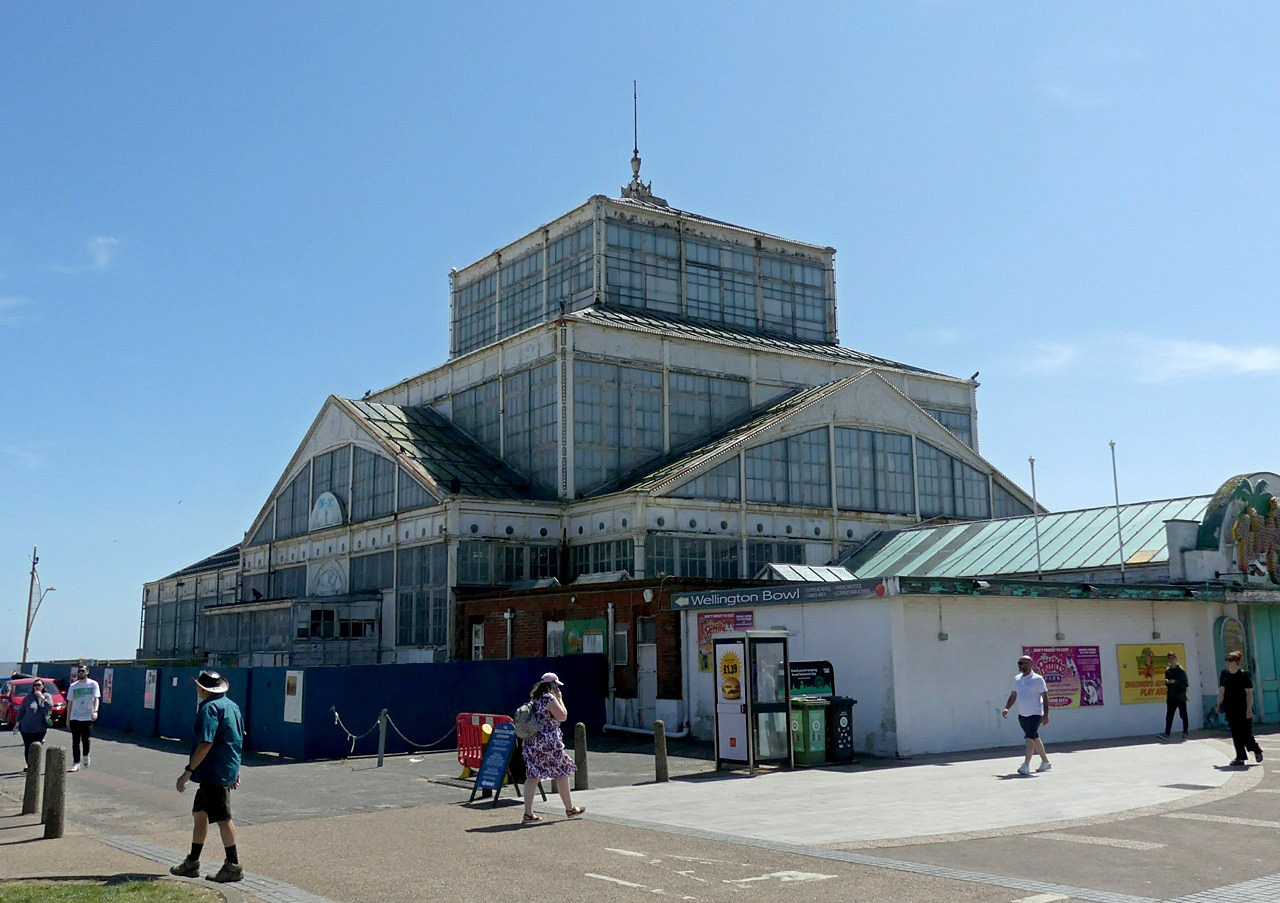
- Winter Gardens in 2024
- Interactive map of the Winter Gardens area

General information
- Type: Conservatory
- Location: Great Yarmouth, United Kingdom
- Coordinates: 52.59963°N 1.73679°E
- Grid position: TG 53148 06762
- Year built: 1878–1881

Height
- Height: 83 feet (25 m)

Technical details
- Material: Cast iron, glass

Design and construction
- Architects: John Watson and William Harvey

Listed Building – Grade II*
- Designated: 5 August 1974
- Reference no.: 1271608

Winter Gardens is a grade II* listed Victorian cast iron and glass building in Great Yarmouth, England. Located next to Wellington Pier, it is the only remaining iron and glass seaside winter garden in England, and was one of the three largest structures of this type in the nation.

Initially completed in Torquay in 1881 by John Watson and William Harvey, it was moved by barge to Yarmouth in 1903 or 1904 after being initially unsuccessful. It has been closed since 2008 after falling into disrepair, though is due to undergo restoration works costing £18 million.

It is listed on the Heritage at Risk Register with a Priority Grade of B, indicating an immediate risk of further rapid deterioration or loss of historic fabric, with a solution having been agreed but not yet implemented.

== History ==
=== 1878–1904: Torquay ===
Winter Gardens was built in Torquay, Devon from 1878 to 1881 at a cost of £12,783 by John Watson and William Harvey of Watson & Harvey, also featuring ironwork by Jesse Tildesley of the Crescent Iron Works, Willenhall, Staffordshire. It proved unsuccessful in Devon.

=== 1904–2008: Great Yarmouth ===
In 1903 or 1904, Great Yarmouth Borough Council's Surveyor, J. W. Cockrill, oversaw the purchase of the building at a discounted price of £1,300, around a tenth of its original cost. He noted that it would be desirable to "lengthen the season with better-class visitors, and on wet days to provide for 2,000 persons under cover." In 1904, the building was dismantled in sections and moved to Norfolk by barge, reportedly without the breakage of any of its glass panes, and reconstructed by the entrance of Wellington Pier. Cockrill added a brick-arched entrance porch for a cloakroom. In 1909, he also added a maple floor for roller skating. The building was also used for concerts and dancing, featuring an organ above the entrance at the west end.

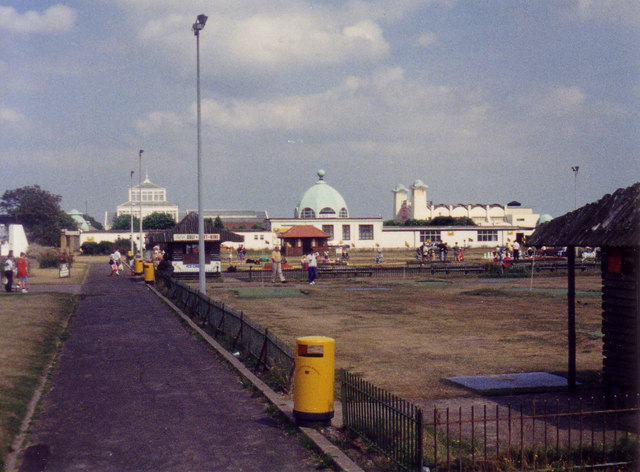
Winter Gardens in the distance (left) in 1991

It became a grade II listed building in August 1974. In the late 20th century, the glazing panels in its roof were replaced, and a separate structural frame was inserted to support the tower and lantern.

=== 2008–present: Closure and restoration plans ===
The structure had fallen into disrepair by 2008, and was closed down that year as a result. In March 2010 its listed status was updated to grade II*. In 2018, it was named among the top ten endangered buildings of the Victorian and Edwardian eras in a survey released by the Victorian Society.

In July 2021 Winter Gardens received a £10 million National Lottery Heritage Fund (NLHF) grant to support its repair and reopening, as well as £5 million from a recent Town Deal grant, amounting to £16 million total. At this time, the building was rusting and was described as an "eyesore" by a local. Work was expected to start in 2023. Designs for the landmark were finalised in January 2025, including high-quality glazing, heating and cooling systems, planting, rainwater harvesting, irrigation and low energy and decarbonisation. A contractor, Vinci Building, was appointed to begin the first phase of the restoration works in August, with plans for its reopening to take place in 2028. By this point, funding totalled £18 million, with £12.3 million coming from the NLHF, £6 million from the Government's UK Towns Fund, and a £500,000 grant from Historic England.

== Architecture ==
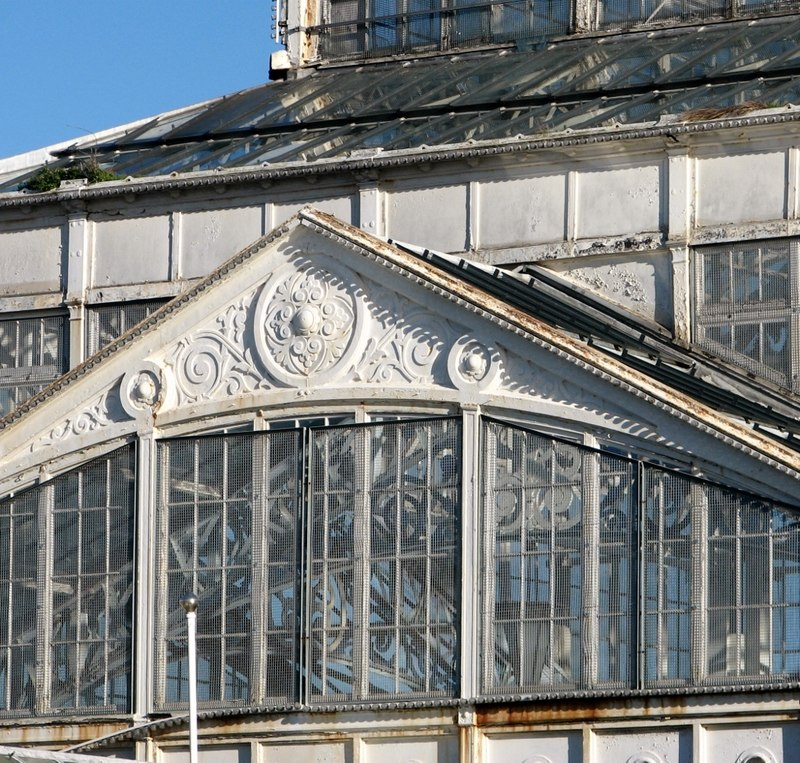
Detail of Winter Gardens's gables

The building is based on the Crystal Palace of London. It features a cast iron frame with glass, and is stood on a plinth covered in L-shaped Cockrill-Doulton tiles. Its plan is rectangular, being around 170 feet (52 m) on its east–west stretch. At its west end, short gabled transepts project to the north, south and west.

The building's exterior features a square tower and lantern at a height of 83 feet (25 m) height above the west end, and a pyramidal roof topped with an urn finial on a sculpted base. The building has square section columns with Corinthian capitals on its lower stage, and palmette capitals above. These divide the structure into three-part panels that have solid rectangular panels above and below, some with central ventilation roundels. At the end of each gable are floral and scroll motifs.

== See also ==
- Grade II* listed buildings in Great Yarmouth
- Media related to Winter Gardens, Great Yarmouth at Wikimedia Commons
