= Great Yarmouth Town Hall =

Municipal building in Great Yarmouth, Norfolk, England

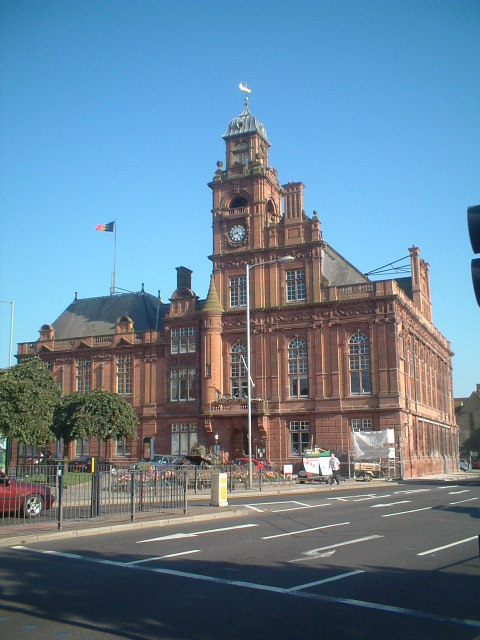
- Great Yarmouth Town Hall

- Shown in Norfolk
- 52°36′22″N 1°43′30″E
- Location: Hall Plain, Great Yarmouth

History
- Built: 1882

Site notes
- Architect: John Bond Pearce
- Architectural style: Queen Anne Revival style

Listed Building – Grade II*
- Official name: Town Hall
- Designated: 5 August 1974
- Reference no.: 1246969

Great Yarmouth Town Hall is a municipal building in Hall Plain, Great Yarmouth, Norfolk, England. The town hall, which is the meeting place of Great Yarmouth Borough Council, is a Grade II* listed building.

== History ==
In medieval times the main civic building in the town was the Tolhouse which had been completed in 1150. A dedicated town hall, designed in the neoclassical style with a full-height tetrastyle portico, was built on the quayside and completed in 1716. The principal room inside was the dining room which contained a portrait by James Worsdale of King George II and a wooden scale model of the Britannia Monument. A lock-up for petty criminals was erected at the back of the town hall in 1842.

In the 1870s civic leaders decided to demolish the old town hall and commission a new town hall on the same site: the foundation stone for the new building was laid by the mayor, Councillor Charles Cory Aldred, on 20 April 1880. It was designed by John Bond Pearce in the Queen Anne Revival style, was built with terracotta facings and was officially opened by the Prince of Wales on 31 May 1882.

The design involved an asymmetrical main frontage with seven bays facing onto a small side street off Regent Street; the third bay from the right featured an arched doorway flanked by brackets supporting a balcony; there was a round headed sash window on the first floor flanked by a bartizan on the left and a pilaster on the right, with a sash window on the second floor and a 110 feet (34 m) high clock tower with a lantern above. The quarter-chiming clock was by Thwaites & Reed. Internally, the principal rooms, which were all on the first floor, were the assembly hall on the west side (facing the River Yare), the courtroom in the south east corner and the council chamber in the north east corner. The assembly hall was described at the time of the official opening as "one of the finest interiors in Eastern England and a measure, like the entire building, of the town's prosperity in the late 19th century." There were issues with the quality of foundations and, after some subsidence took place on the side adjacent to the river, some underpinning works were undertaken in November 1886.

The building served as the headquarters of Great Yarmouth County Borough Council for much of the 20th century and has continued to operate as the local seat of government following the formation of the enlarged Great Yarmouth Borough Council in 1974. Meanwhile, the courtroom continued to function as a magistrates' court until 1990. A programme of restoration works for the building was completed in 2008.

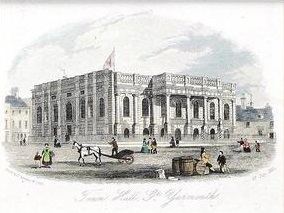
The town hall of 1716

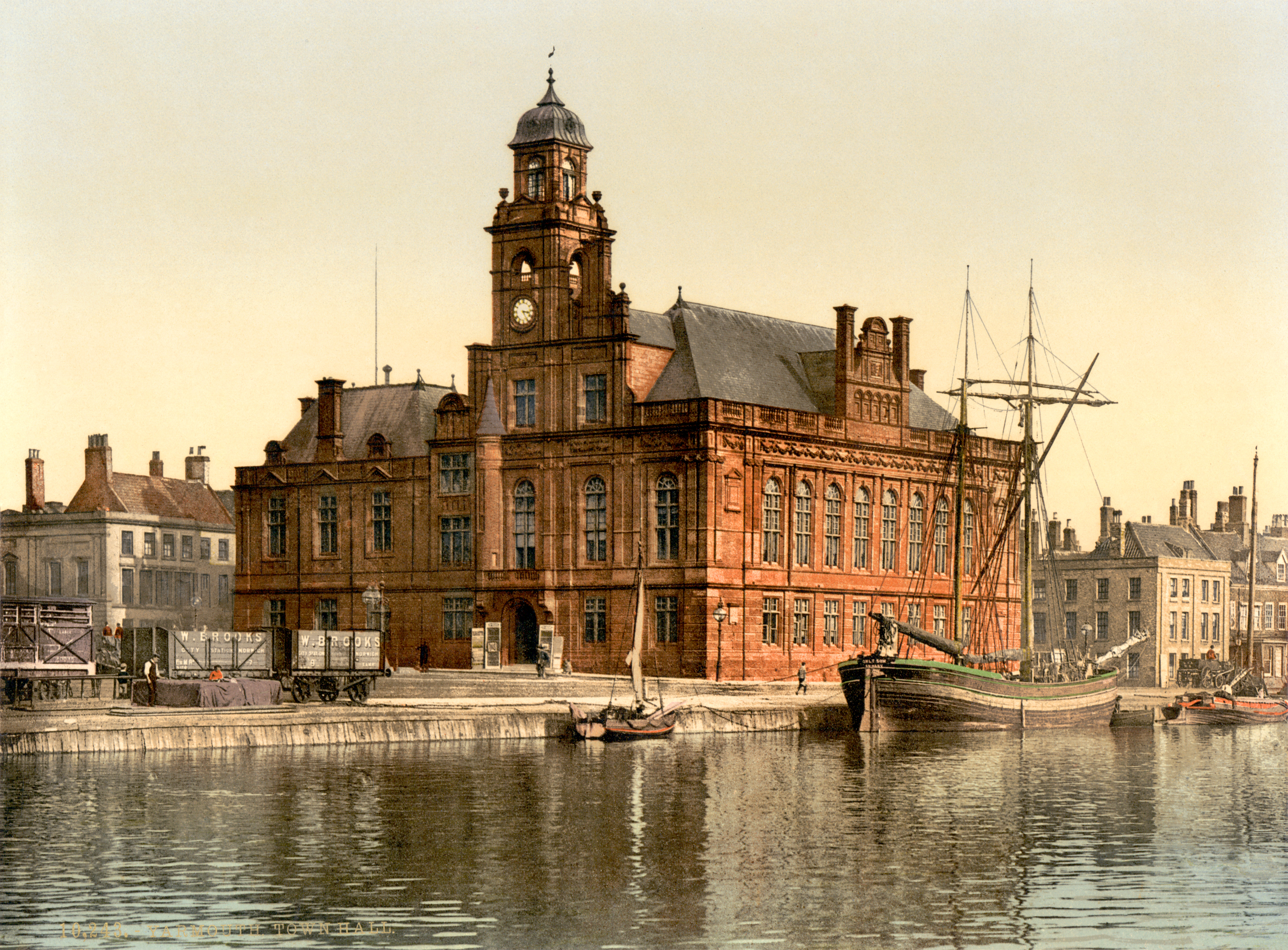
Great Yarmouth Town Hall, c. 1895

== See also ==
- Grade II* listed buildings in Great Yarmouth
