= Royal Hotel, Great Yarmouth =

Hotel in Great Yarmouth, Norfolk, England

Royal Hotel
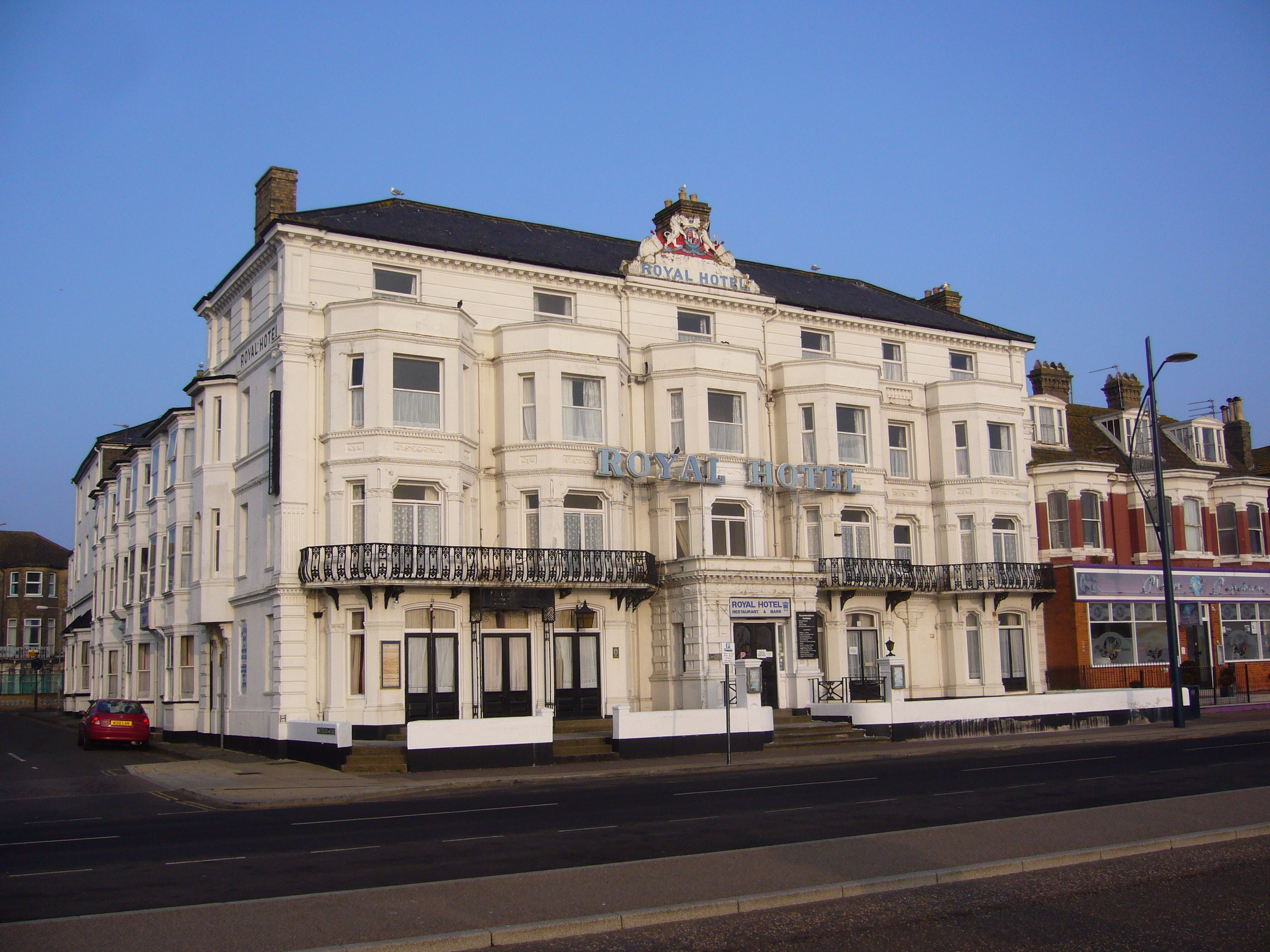

- Norfolk

General information
- Location: Great Yarmouth, Norfolk, England, 16 Wellington Road; Great Yarmouth; Norfolk; NR30 3AE
- Coordinates: 52°36′4.08″N 1°44′7.62″E
- Opening: 1840

Other information
- Number of rooms: 57 bedrooms

Listed Building – Grade II
- Designated: 5 August 1974
- Reference no.: 1246584

The Royal Hotel is a grade II listed building which is in the English seaside resort town of Great Yarmouth in the county of Norfolk, United Kingdom.

== Location ==
It is on the seafront and Victoria Road is behind it and so is Wellington Road.

== History ==
This hotel was built in 1840 and was then called the Victoria Hotel. It was then renamed the Royal Hotel and at this time was the last and most southern hotel on the seafront. In 1847 the English writer and social critic Charles Dickens stayed in the hotel, along with his friend and colleague Mark Lemon who was the founding editor of both Punch and The Field. at the time Dickens was occupied writing his Novel David Copperfield which was first published as a serial. During his stay at the hotel, Dickens had described Great Yarmouth to his wife in a letter thus Yarmouth was the most wondrous sight his eyes had ever beheld. He also, during this visit met James Sharman who was the keeper of the Britannia Monument, on whom he supposedly based the character of Ham Peggotty. In the hotel's Palm court, a menu which has been signed by Dickens during his stay there is on display.

=== Refurbishment ===
The hotel was re-furbished and extended in 1877 by the Norwich architect J B Pearce.

=== Royal Patronage ===
King Edward VII stayed at the hotel in the latter part of the 1800s where he is reported to have entertained his mistress, music hall singer and stage actress, Lily Langtree, better known as the Jersey Lily. The hotel still displays the crest of Edward VII on the front façade of the hotel. It is well-known and bona fide that Her Majesty the Queen sent a special message to the hotel during a visit to Great Yarmouth
