= Thurne Dyke Mill =

Tower mill in Thurne, Norfolk, England

- Thurne Dyke Mill, April 2011
- Interactive map of Thurne Dyke Mill

Origin
- Mill name: Thurne Dyke Mill
- Mill location: Thurne, Norfolk, United Kingdom
- Grid reference: TG 4004 1592
- Coordinates: 52°41′15″N 1°33′03″E
- Year built: 1820

Information
- Purpose: Drainage mill
- Type: Tower mill
- Storeys: Three storeys
- No. of sails: Four
- Type of sails: Patent sails
- Windshaft: Cast iron
- Winding: Fantail
- Fantail blades: Eight
- Auxiliary power: Steam engine
- Type of pump: Appold turbine
- Other information: Website

Thurne Dyke or Morse's Mill is a Grade II* listed tower mill at Thurne, Norfolk, United Kingdom. Built in 1820, it worked until 1936. The mill has been restored and is occasionally open to the public.

== History ==
Thurne Dyke Mill was built in 1820 for the Drainage Commissioners. The mill was builty by England & Co, millwrights of Ludham. It was raised a storey in 1835 by Dan England, millwright of Ludham. Patent sails replaced the Common sails at this date. The mill originally had a scoopwheel. The mill's cap and sails were blown off in a gale in 1919. In 1926, the scoopwheel was replaced by an Appold turbine and a steam engine was installed as auxiliary power. The mill ceased working by wind in 1936 due to damaged sails.

The mill was bought in 1949 by Robert D. Morse, and restored with the assistance of millwright Albert England. It had been painted white by 1950. The mill was fitted with four new sails in 1962 by Thomas Smithdale & Sons, millwrights of Acle. This work was carried out under a Norfolk County Council mill repair scheme. The mill was listed Grade II on 7 December 1962. The mill was leased to the Norfolk Windmills Trust inn 1964. Arthur C. Smith surveyed the mill on 21 May 1973. Noting that the mill had the alternative name of Morse's Mill, he described the mill as restored with four shutterless Patent sails and a windmill fantail. The mill retained its machinery. A further restoration was undertaken by the Norfolk Windmills Trust in 1975. The mill's listing was upgrade to Grade II* on 7 May 1983. Smith surveyed the mill again on 22 May 1986. The mill's condition had not changed. He noted that the mill was open to the public in the summer. The Norfolk Windmills Trust fitted some shutters to the sails in 2002 The mill turned by wind for the first time in preservation in September 2002. Morse died on 2 January 2007, leaving the mill to Debra Nicholson. In 2014, the Norfolk Windmills Trust decided not to renew their lease. The mill was repainted in 2018.

== Description ==
As built, Thurne Dyke Mill was a two-storey tower mill. It had Common sails and was winded by a tailpole. It drove a scoopwheel.

As rebuilt, the mill is a three-storey tower mill. It has a boat shape cap with petticoat and gallery. Four Patent sails are carried on a cast iron windshaft. The mill is winded by an eight bladed fantail. The windshaft carries a cast iron brake wheel. This drives the wallower, at the top of the wooden upright shaft. At the bottom, a cast iron crown wheel drives the Appold turbine.
