= Wiseman's Mill, Oby =

Mill building in Oby, Norfolk, England

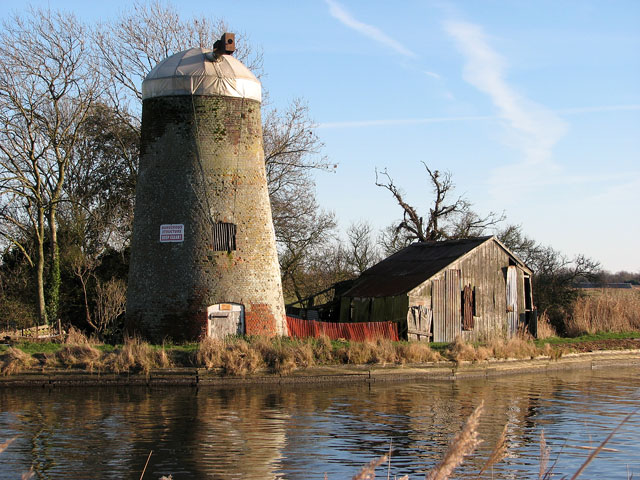
- Wiseman's Mill, January 2009
- Interactive map of Wiseman's Mill, Oby

Origin
- Mill name: Wiseman's Mill
- Mill location: Oby, Norfolk, United Kingdom
- Grid reference: TG 4092 1381
- Coordinates: 52°40′07″N 1°33′43″E
- Year built: 1753

Information
- Purpose: Drainage mill and saw mill
- Type: Tower mill
- Storeys: Three storeys
- No. of sails: Four
- Type of sails: Patent sails
- Windshaft: Cast iron
- Winding: Fantail
- Fantail blades: Six
- Auxiliary power: Diesel engine
- Type of pump: Scoopwheel, later Appold turbine

Wiseman's Mill is a Grade II* listed drainage and former saw mill at Oby, Norfolk, United Kingdom. Built in 1753, it worked until 1933, then became derelict. Restoration of the mill started in 2018.

== History ==
Wiseman's Mill was built in 1753 for the Wyndham Cremer family. It was run by the Wiseman family from 1836. As well as being used for drainage, the mill drove a saw, likely used for estate purposes and not commercial trade. The mill worked a scoopwheel. Later an Appold turbine was fitted and a diesel engine installed as auxiliary power.

The mill was working until 1933, when the sails and fantail were removed. Only the cap frame, stock and fanstage remained c.1960. The mill was listed Grade II* on 4 December 1987. C.2000, the stocks and fanstage were removed, and a shaped tarpaulin fitted to the mill to keep the weather out. In August 2018, Norwich charity The Missing Kind started restoration of the mill in conjunction with Norwich City College and the Broads Authority.

== Description ==
Wiseman's mill is a three storey tower mill. It had a boat shape cap with a petticoat. Four double Patent sails were carried on a cast iron windshaft. The sails had seven bays, six bays of three shutters with the innermost bay having two shutters. The mill was winded by a six-bladed fantail. A scoop wheel was driven. This was later replaced by an Appold turbine.
