= Church of St Peter, Gorleston-on-Sea =

Coordinates: 52.5762°N 1.7271°E

St Peter's Church
- Roman Catholic Church of St Peter, Gorleston-on-Sea
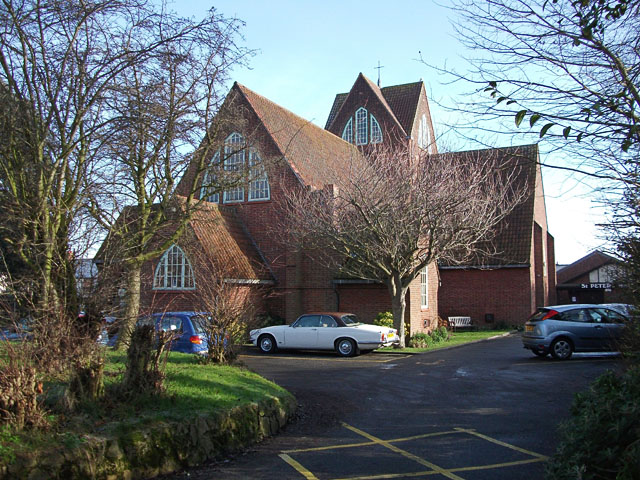

- Location in Norfolk
- OS grid reference: TG 52624 04123
- Location: Gorleston-on-Sea, Norfolk
- Country: England
- Denomination: Roman Catholic
- Website: https://www.stpetersrc.org.uk/

History
- Dedication: Saint Peter

Architecture
- Functional status: Active
- Heritage designation: Grade II*
- Designated: 5 August 1974
- Architect: Eric Gill
- Architectural type: Church

St Peter's Church is an active Roman Catholic church in the town of Gorleston-on-Sea, Norfolk, England. The church was built between 1938 and 1939 to the designs of Eric Gill and is his only building. St Peter's is a Grade II* listed structure.

== History ==
The first Catholic place of worship in Gorleston since the English Reformation, the church was opened in a malt house on Church Lane in 1899. In 1908, its first marriage ceremony occurred, uniting a Mr Ambrose Page with a Mrs Nellie Carson. Page later left money for the establishment of a new church; a site was purchased on Lowestoft Road in 1913 and construction finally began in 1938. The local Catholic priest, Father Thomas Walker, engaged Eric Gill to design the church, due to their common, and for the time advanced, thinking on Catholic liturgy. The builder was H. R. Middleton & Co. of Great Yarmouth and the total cost of construction was £6,775.

Eric Gill (1882-1940) had trained as an architect but had never practiced, making his name as a sculptor, letter cutter and illustrator. His national biography described him as "the greatest artist-craftsman of the twentieth century". (Note: Gill’s reputation has become highly controversial since revelations relating to his sexual abuse were published in 1989 in a biography by Fiona MacCarthy.) Recognising his inexperience, Gill commissioned a local architect, J. Edmund Farrell, to work with him on the designs. Gill's approach was highly innovative, placing the altar in the centre of the church to encourage the engagement of the congregation in the celebration of the Eucharist. It was an idea he first explored in an essay, Mass for the Masses, and which subsequently became widely accepted in the Catholic Church following the Second Vatican Council in 1965. (Note: St Peter's was the second such church in England to be designed with a centrally placed altar. The first was the Church of St Cuthbert and the First Martyrs of the Church of Rome, in Bradford, Yorkshire. The priest-in-charge who initiated the design was Father John O'Connor, a friend of Gill, and the inspiration for G. K. Chesterton's fictional detective Father Brown.)

Gill died in 1940, a year after the church was largely complete, but its consecration was delayed until 1964. The church, Gill's only such built design, is a Grade II* listed building. The associated presbytery, also by Gill, has a separate Grade II listing. St Peter’s remains an active Catholic church in the Diocese of East Anglia.

== Architecture and description ==
The church is built of brick, to a cruciform plan, flowing outwards from the centrally placed altar. Bill Wilson, in his 2002 revised Norfolk 1: Norwich and North-East edition of the Pevsner Buildings of England, notes the important place of the stilted pointed arch in the overall design. Changes made to the interior of the building in the second half of the 20th century compromised the integrity of the original design, including the installation of stained glass which Gill had specifically rejected. Some of these modifications have subsequently been reversed.

== Sources ==
- Pevsner, Nikolaus; Wilson, Bill (2002). Norfolk 1: Norwich and North-East. The Buildings Of England. New Haven, US and London: Yale University Press. ISBN 978-0-300-09607-1.
