= Thurne =

Village in Norfolk, England

Coordinates: 52.68659°N 1.55256°E

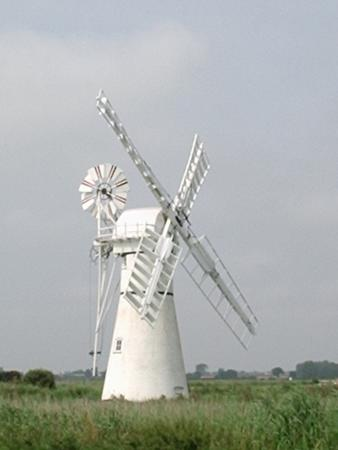
- Thurne Dyke windpump

- Location within Norfolk
- Area: 2.69 km^{2} (1.04 sq mi)
- Population: 212 (2011)
  - Density: 79/km^{2} (200/sq mi)
- OS grid reference: TG402158
- Civil parish: Thurne
- District: Great Yarmouth
- Shire county: Norfolk
- Region: East
- Country: England
- Sovereign state: United Kingdom
- Post town: GREAT YARMOUTH
- Postcode district: NR29
- Police: Norfolk
- Fire: Norfolk
- Ambulance: East of England
- UK Parliament: Great Yarmouth

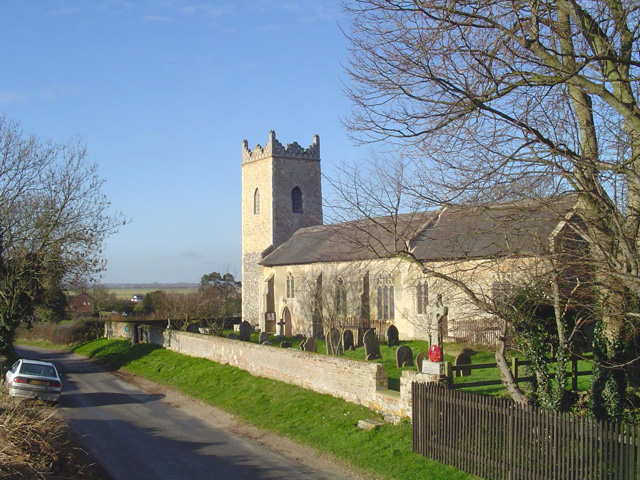
St Edmund's Church, Thurne

Thurne is a small village and civil parish in the English county of Norfolk. It is located on the River Thurne in The Broads, some 18 km (11 mi) west of the town of Great Yarmouth and 20 km (12 mi) east of the city of Norwich.

The village's name means 'Thorn-bush'.

The civil parish has an area of 2.69 km^{2} (1.04 sq mi) and in the 2001 census had a population of 116 in 54 households and at the 2011 Census, including Ashby with Oby, had a population of 212 in 94 households. For the purposes of local government, the parish falls within the district of Great Yarmouth.

The village lies at the end of Thurne Dyke, a popular mooring, not least because of Thurne windpump, which became known locally as Morse's Mill, after Bob Morse who purchased it to prevent it from being sold for scrap. It is a popular object for photography, after being painted white. There is a second windpump across the river, the St Benet's Level Windpump.

St Edmund's Church is a Grade II* listed building.

Thurne is also home to the well-respected sailing club Theta, which has been accommodated here for over half a century and is part of the village's character. Free moorings are available for three boats at Thurne mouth. From there, it is a short walk to the village, with a large pub, the Lion Inn, and a small shop.

The Weavers' Way, a long-distance footpath, runs through the village.

Thurne in 1954 is featured in film held by the Cinema Museum in London. Ref HM0568.
