= Mundesley =

Village in Norfolk, England

Coordinates: 52.876°N 1.438°E

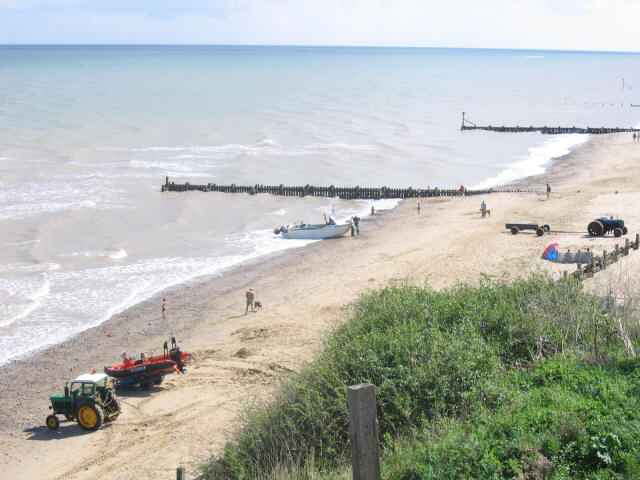
- Mundesley Beach

- Location within Norfolk
- Area: 2.84 km^{2} (1.10 sq mi)
- Population: 2,758 (parish, 2011 census)
  - Density: 971/km^{2} (2,510/sq mi)
- OS grid reference: TG315365
  - London: 136 miles (219 km)
- Civil parish: Mundesley
- District: North Norfolk
- Shire county: Norfolk
- Region: East
- Country: England
- Sovereign state: United Kingdom
- Post town: NORWICH
- Postcode district: NR11
- Dialling code: 01263
- Police: Norfolk
- Fire: Norfolk
- Ambulance: East of England
- UK Parliament: North Norfolk

Mundesley /ˈmʌn.zli/ is a coastal village and a civil parish in the English county of Norfolk. The village is 20 miles (32 km) north-northeast of Norwich, 7 miles (11 km) southeast of Cromer and 6 miles (9.7 km) north-northeast of the town of North Walsham.

== Correct pronunciation ==
"Mundsley"; "Munslee";"Munzly"

== Geographical overview ==
The nearest airport is Norwich Airport. The village sits astride the B1159 coast road that links Cromer and Caister-on-Sea, and is at the eastern end of the B1145 a route which runs between King's Lynn and Mundesley. Mundesley is within the Norfolk Coast AONB. It has a resident population of around 2,695 (parish, 2001 census), measured at 2,758 in the 2011 census. and 2,778 in the 2021 census.

The River Mun, also known as Mundesley Beck, flows into the sea here. On 5 September 2022 Mundesley beach won the North Norfolk District Council Battle of the Beaches to be recognised as the top beach in North Norfolk in a close run off against West Runton beach.

== History ==
The villages name means 'Mul's/Mundel's wood/clearing'.

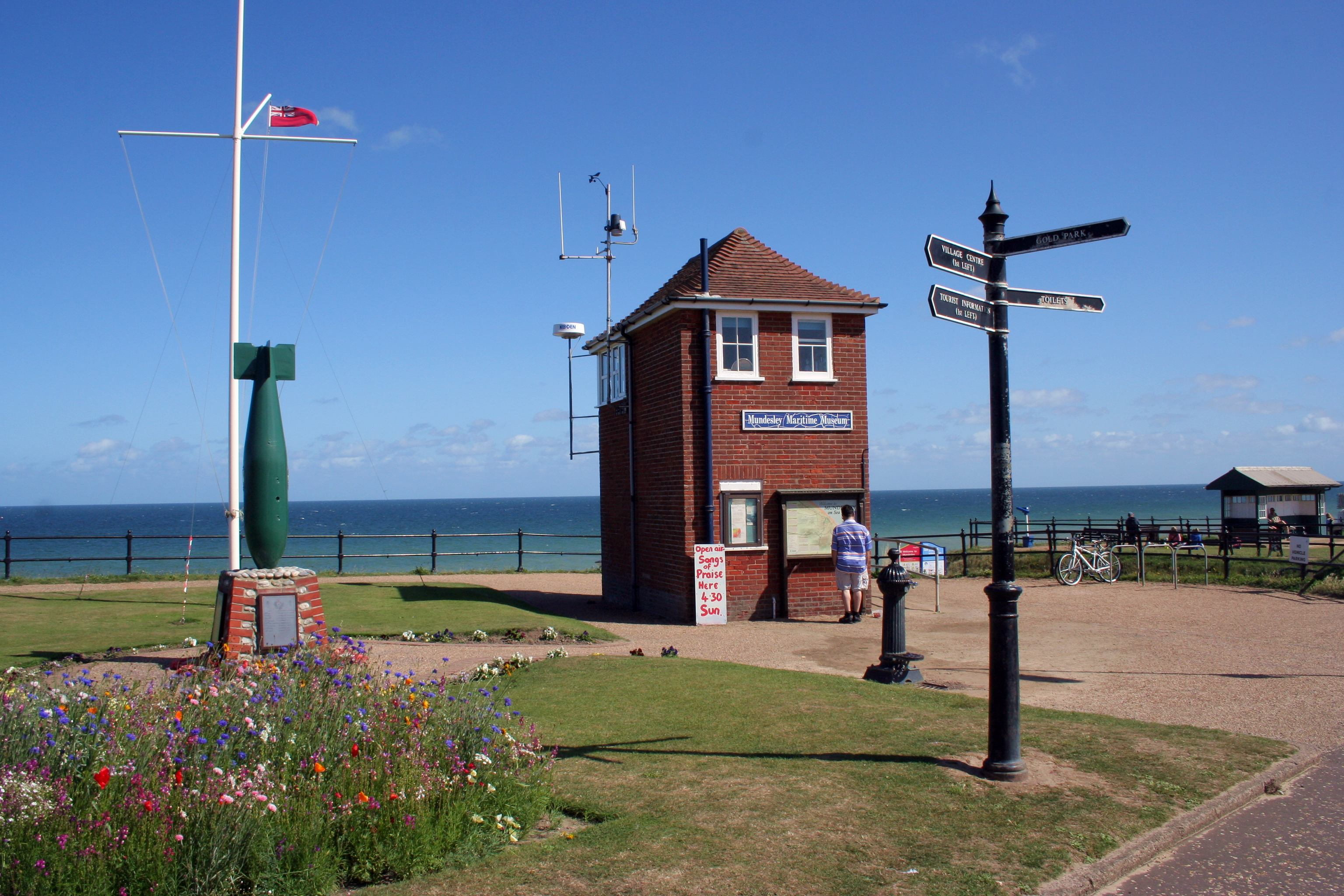
Mundesley Maritime Museum and war memorial in August 2013

Mundesley has an entry in the Domesday Book of 1086, with the town's name recorded as Muleslai. The main landholder was William de Warenne, and the survey also lists a church.

=== Second World War ===
The Mundesley Memorial Bomb is dedicated to Army teams who removed mines after the Second World War. There is a War memorial inside the Church and on the seafront at the Coastwatch station and museum. Near to the church is a World War II gun emplacement, which now stands near the edge of the cliff, due to coastal erosion.

== Governance ==
An electoral ward in the same name exists. This ward includes Bacton and had had total population at the 2011 Census of 4,191.

== Tourism ==
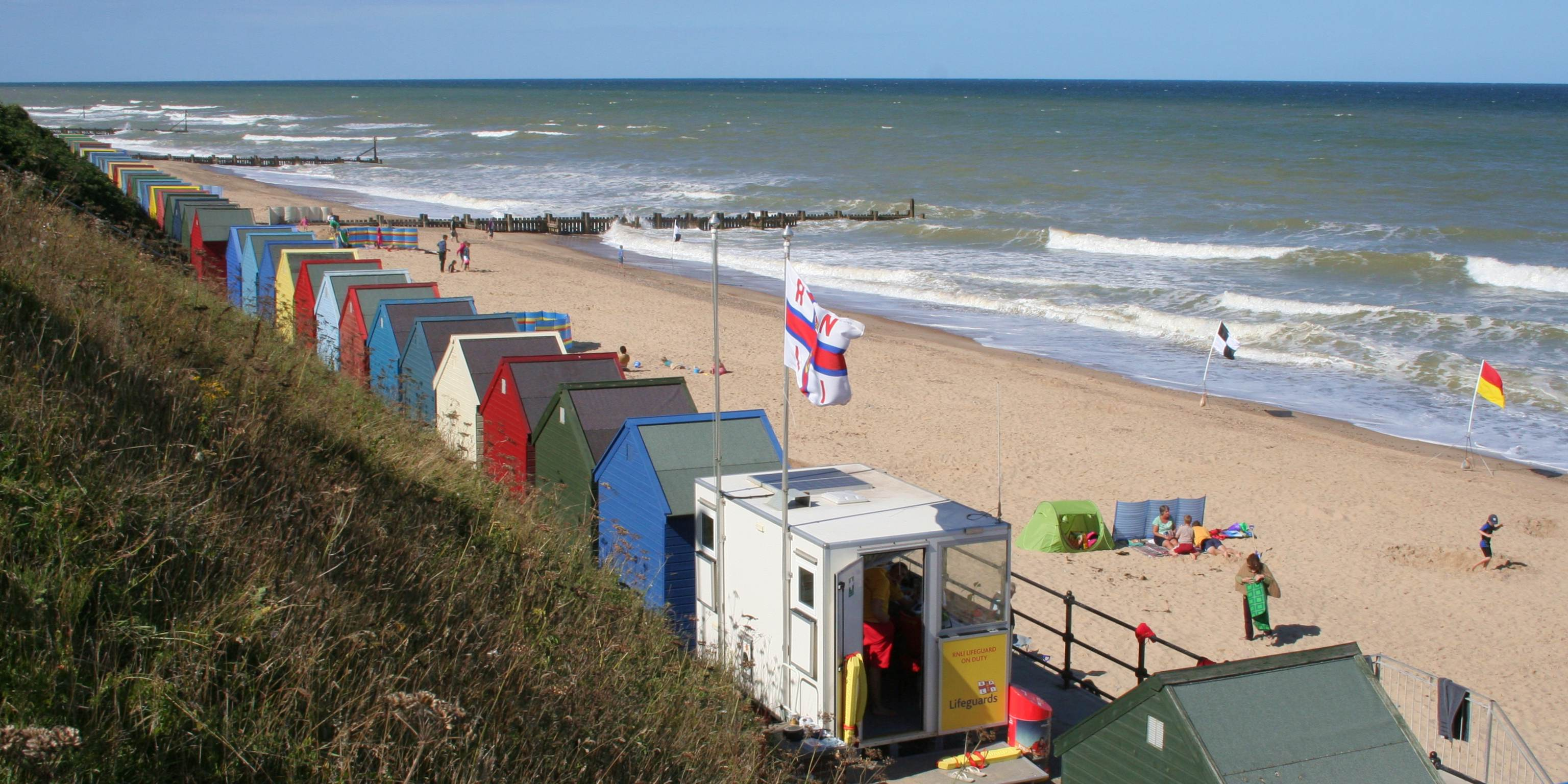
Mundesley Beach in August 2013

Mundesley is a popular seaside holiday destination due to its sandy beaches and has a number of holiday chalet and caravan parks and hotels. Just to the south of Mundesley on the road to Paston is a popular windmill, Stow Mill. The village was a popular seaside resort in Victorian times, benefiting from its own railway station which closed in 1964.

=== Golf course ===
The village has an historic golf course in the Mun Valley, established in 1901 and designed with the help of six-times Open Champion Harry Vardon. Vardon convalesced at the nearby sanitorium while recovering from tuberculosis and his association with the course spanned many years. It is said that he scored his only hole-in-one on what is now the sixth. The course was altered when land was required for wartime farming and was redesigned when the conflicts ended.

== Village amenities ==
=== Parish church ===
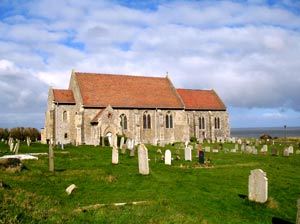
All Saints' Church

All Saints' Church is located on the cliffs above the sea. The church was in ruins for over one hundred years before it was restored at the start of the 20th century. In 1904 the western end was extended to make an organ chamber, and then in 1914 the nave was extended eastwards, with a new chancel on the site of the old one.

=== Village centre ===
The village centre offers shops including a butchers, clothing, arts and crafts, chemist, a public library and convenience stores. Mundesley also has its own medical centre and primary school. There is an adventure island crazy golf park close to the seafront. There is a very small maritime museum which is also the local lookout of the National Coastwatch Institution, a charity offering 365 days' lookout in over 50 stations along the British coast.

=== Public houses and hotels ===
There are two pubs in Mundesley. One of the oldest is the Ship Inn situated on the seafront. Its first landlord is listed as being Paul Harrison in 1836. Its flint construction is characteristic of the older parts of the village. A little inland, on the road to Paston, is the Royal Hotel, where Lord Nelson is said to have lived for a while.

== See also ==
- Grand Hotel (former hotel)
- Mundesley Volunteer Inshore Lifeboat
