= Fleggburgh =

Village in Norfolk, England

Coordinates: 52.668°N 1.615°E

Burgh Saint Margaret
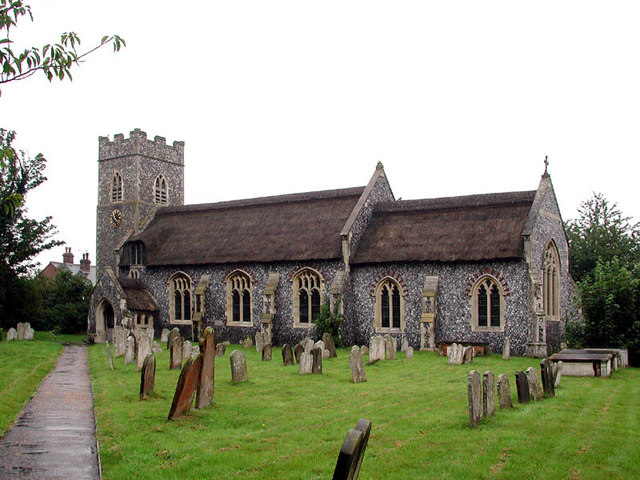
- St. Margaret's Church, Burgh St Margaret

- Location within Norfolk
- Area: 4.62 sq mi (12.0 km^{2})
- Population: 1,088 (2021)
  - Density: 235/sq mi (91/km^{2})
- OS grid reference: TG445140
  - London: 108 miles (174 km)
- Civil parish: Burgh St Margaret
- District: Great Yarmouth
- Shire county: Norfolk
- Region: East
- Country: England
- Sovereign state: United Kingdom
- Post town: GREAT YARMOUTH
- Postcode district: NR29
- Dialling code: 01493
- Police: Norfolk
- Fire: Norfolk
- Ambulance: East of England
- UK Parliament: Great Yarmouth

Fleggburgh, also known as Burgh St Margaret, is a village and civil parish in the English county of Norfolk. It is 6 miles (9.7 km) north-west of Great Yarmouth and 14 miles (23 km) east of Norwich, bisected by the A1064 road. It includes the former parishes of Clippesby and Billockby.

== History ==
Burgh's St. Margaret's and Fleggburgh's names are both of Anglo-Saxon origin. In the Domesday Book, Burgh St. Margaret is listed as a settlement of 63 households in the hundred of West Flegg. In 1086, the village was divided between the East Anglian estates of King William I, Roger Bigod, Bishop William of Thetford and St Benet's Abbey.

During the Second World War, several pillboxes and a guardhouse were built across the parish to defend the crossing of the River Bure in the event of a German invasion of Great Britain.

== Geography ==
Fleggburgh is located on the A1064 road, between Acle and Caister-on-Sea and on the western edge of the Trinity Broads, a Site of Special Scientific Interest, within The Broads National Park. According to the 2021 census, Fleggburgh has a population of 1,088 people which shows an increase from the 948 people recorded in the 2011 census.

== Churches ==
Fleggburgh's parish church is dedicated to Saint Margaret and was built in the Nineteenth Century by the architect, Herbert John Green. St. Margaret's is located within the village on Main Road and has been Grade II listed since 1962.

The interior holds a brass memorial to Richard Burton who served as Rector of the parish in the early-Seventeenth Century and stained-glass installed in the 1960s by Paul Jeffries, depicting Saint Margaret, Saint Luke and Saint Mary.

Clippesby's church is dedicated to St Peter and is one of the 124 existing round-tower churches in Norfolk. All Saints' Church, Billockby remains in use although it is partially ruined.

== Amenities ==
The majority of local children attend Fleggburgh Church of England Primary School. The village has one public house that remains in business; The Kings Arms has stood on its current site since the late-18th Century, except for a short period in the early-19th Century when a license was refused to Mrs Mary Puxley on the grounds of aiding and assisting a riot that led to the cruel wounding and beating of Mr Robert Chasteney, a local surveyor.
