= Clippesby =

Village in Norfolk, England

Coordinates: 52.675°N 1.590°E

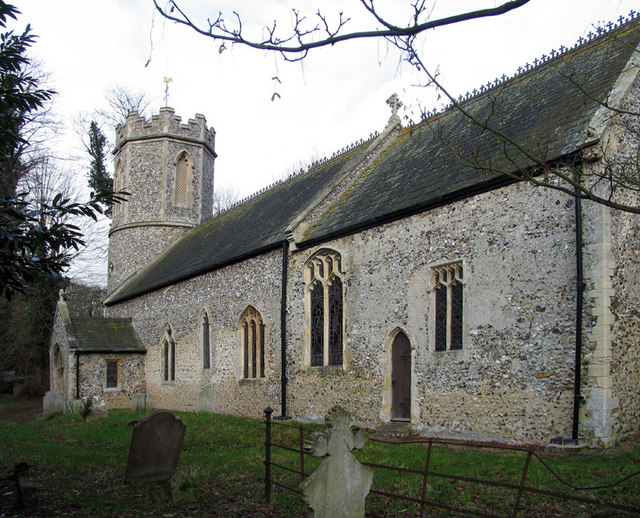
- St. Peter's Church

- Location within Norfolk
- OS grid reference: TG428146
- Civil parish: Fleggburgh
- District: Great Yarmouth
- Shire county: Norfolk
- Region: East
- Country: England
- Sovereign state: United Kingdom
- Post town: Great Yarmouth
- Postcode district: NR29
- Dialling code: 01493
- Police: Norfolk
- Fire: Norfolk
- Ambulance: East of England
- UK Parliament: Great Yarmouth

Clippesby is a village and former civil parish, now in the parish of in Fleggburgh, in the Great Yarmouth district, in the English county of Norfolk.

Clippesby is located 7 miles (11 km) south-east of Great Yarmouth and 13 miles (21 km) east of Norwich.

The village consists largely of a few rows of small cottages and houses with four buildings of historical relevance, the Church of St. Peter's, the Rectory, the Old Hall (now Old Hall Farm) and Clippesby Hall (formerly Clippesby House).

== History ==
Clippesby's name is of Viking origin and derives from the Old Norse for Klyppr's or Klippr's village.

The settlement was bordered by the saltwater lagoon that existed before the sandspit where Great Yarmouth now stands formed to block the entrance to the North Sea. Subsequent drainage by windpumps created rich agricultural land upon which the settlement was largely dependent until recent years.

In the Domesday Book, Clippesby is recorded as a settlement of 25 households in the hundred of West Flegg. In 1086, the village was divided between the estates of King William I, Roger Bigot, Bishop William of Thetford and St. Benet's Abbey.

== Clippesby Hall ==
Clippesby Hall has had two incarnations over its history. The first Hall appears to date from 1585 (although Osbert de Salicibus alias de Willows is recorded as Lord in the reign of Henry II – 1154–1189). It was most notably occupied by Sir Clipesby Crewe, Chief Justice of England and first Recorder of Great Yarmouth. The Old Hall subsequently became a farm and is today known as "Old Hall Farm".

The current Hall was formerly known as Clippesby House.

The second Hall and estate was first owned by the Muskett family and is described in the 1903 sales catalogue (reproduced below).

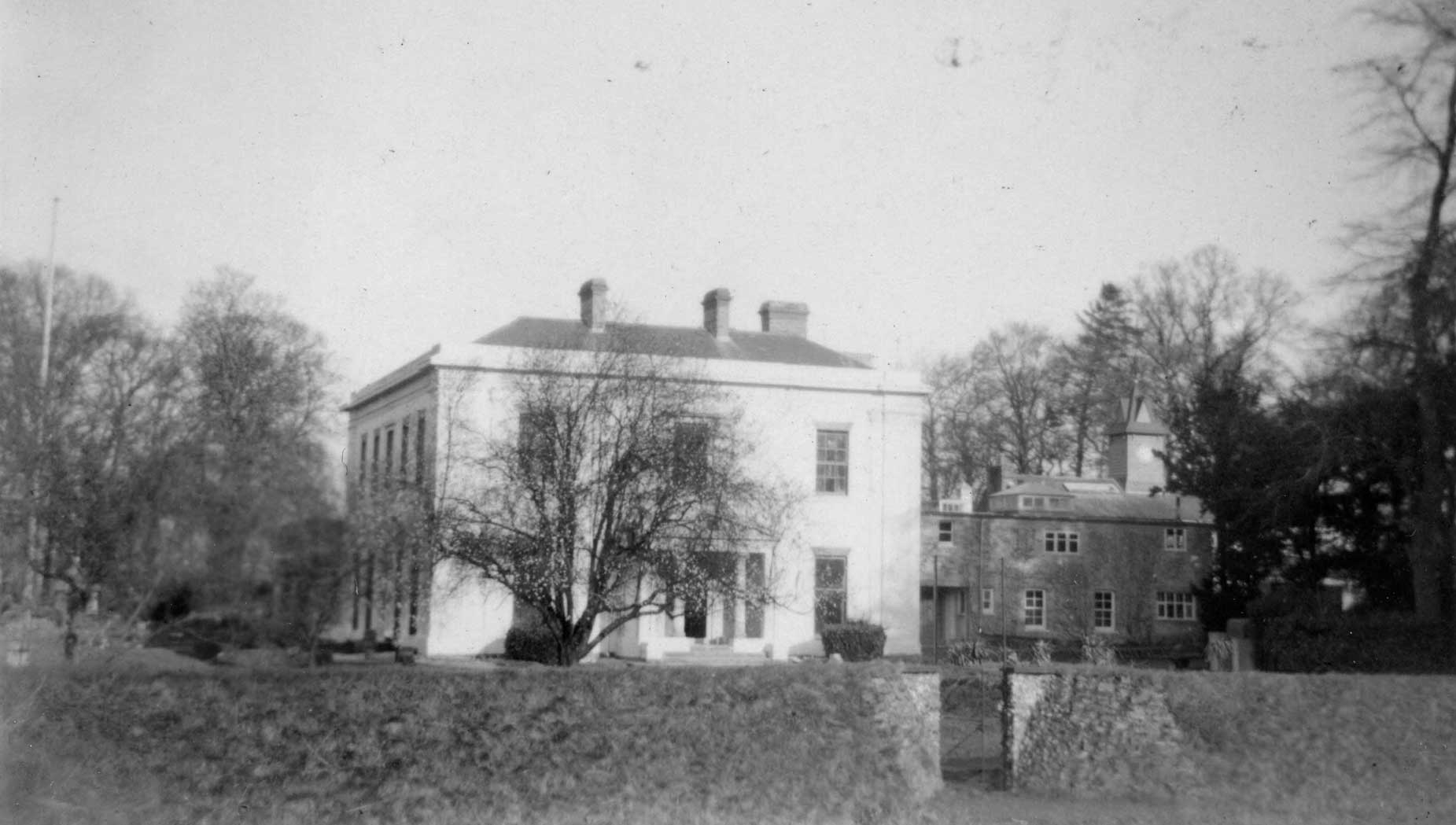
Clippesby Hall

In 1909 the hall was purchased by the artist Peregrine Feeney and his wife Emily. She was the sister-in-law of the noted Pre-Raphaelite painter John William Waterhouse who became a regular visitor and painted the hall on at least one occasion.

Originally the Hall had two storeys but following its use by the army in World War II the upper floor fell into disrepair and was demolished.

Since the war the estate has been used as a market garden, a garden centre and is currently a holiday park. The Hall is still a family home.

== Extract from the 1903 Sale Catalogue for Clippesby Hall ==
General Remarks

The Clippesby Hall Estate lies mainly in a ring fence and is a Sporting Property in the County. There is a proportion of covert with water, which forms a Shelter and Rearing Ground for Pheasants; the uplands hold partridges, whilst on the marshes there are Hares.

The hall is situated on an elevation, sheltered on the north and east by mature trees, with views of surrounding woods and water. It has been structurally restored and decorated by the current occupant, who modernized its facilities

From its close proximity to Acle Bridge and Potter Heigham, both well-known boating stations, where the Broads and waterways of Norfolk can be reached, the Hall forms a home for Yachtsmen.

As regards the Farms, the Arable Lands being of first-rate quality, with a large proportion of superior marshes adjoining, no difficulty need be anticipated in finding tenants at rents equal to or even in excess of the present amount. The majority of the fields abut on good roads, whilst the, river being close at hand, affords an expeditious and cheap means of carriage for corn, coal, and feeding stuffs, thus reducing the tenants' expenses for cartage.

Clippesby is equidistant (about 3 miles) from Acle Station on the Great Eastern Railway; and, Martham Station on the Midland and Great Northern Joint Railway, 5 miles from the' Sea, 9 miles from Great Yarmouth, and 14 from Norwich.

The old Hall, at present used as a Farmhouse, is a fine example of a sixteenth-century Manor House, and bears date 1585. In its windows and carved over the fireplace of the panelled parlour are coats of arms, reputed to be those of its former owners, Clippesby Crewe (Chief Justice of England, and the first recorder of Yarmouth, 1608), and Wryght.

To the memory of John Clippesby, the last of his name, who died in 1594, there is a well-preserved brass in the chancel of St. Peter's Church, which is within a few hundred yards of the Hall, and possesses two interesting specimens of Norman doorways.

The earlier history of the property is believed to be as follows:- Osbert de Salicibus alias de Willows was Lord in the reign of Henry II. In 1320 and in 1338 Peter Buxkyn or de Bukeskyn presented to the Church as Lord.

Sir Clippesby Crewe, grandson of the Chief Justice, appears to have sold the Manor to Sir John Potts, Bart., of Mannington, afterwards it became in turn the property of George England, Captain Clarke, John Ramey, who devised it to his son-in-law, Alexander, ninth Earl of Home, and ultimately it was sold to Joseph Muskett.

All the tenants pay ordinary tenant's rates and taxes, except where otherwise stated. Sporting rights are reserved in the case of all the agricultural tenancies and are now vested in the present tenant of Clippesby Hall during his tenancy thereof. The bulk of the Estate is subject to Land Tax and the whole of it to Tithe Rent charge, which are both payable by the Landlord.

The Purchasers of Lots 1 to 6 inclusive are to pay for Timber and underwoods in accordance with the Conditions of Sale in addition to their purchase-money.

The quantities are taken from the Ordnance map, on which the accompanying plan is also based.

== Geography ==
In 1931 the parish had a population of 136. This was the last time separate population statistics were collated for Clippesby, as on 1 April 1935 the parish was abolished and merged with Fleggburgh.

Clippesby is located on the B1152, between Billockby and Bastwick. The village is surrounded by the Norfolk Broads

== St. Peter's Church ==
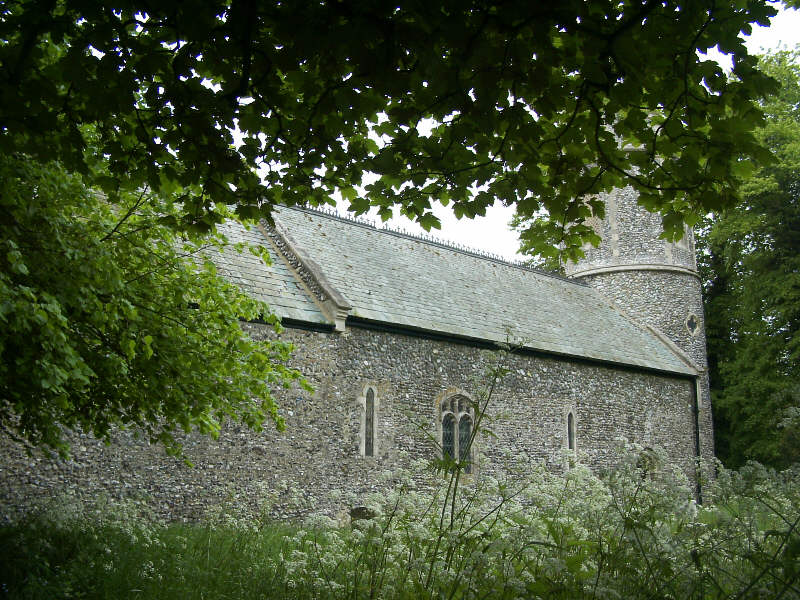
Clippesby St Peter

Clippesby's parish church is dedicated to Saint Peter and is one of the 124 existing round-tower churches in Norfolk, dating from the Twelfth and Thirteenth Centuries. St. Peter's is located on Church Lane.

St. Peter's was heavily rebuilt in the Victorian era and boasts stained-glass designed by M. E. Aldrich Rope depicting various scenes which was Rope's first commission. The font dates from the Fifteenth Century and features various Medieval brasses.

== Rectors of St. Peter's ==
- 1320 Thomas de Spyney.
- 1326 Peter de Pagefield.
- 1338 Ralph de Depham.
- 1338 John Urry.
- 1338 Ralph de Urry.
- 1352 Edmund de Fressingfeld.
- 1361 Henry Gottes.
- 1389 Henry Waggestaff.
- 1390 Thomas de Martham.
- 1409 John Dynyngton.
- 1432 Bartholomew Fuller.
- 1433 Walter Drury (or Davy).
- 1440 John Heroun (or Heton).
- 1459 John Dalton (alias Bentbowe).
- 1471 Thomas Hauley.
- 1473 Richard Foo.
- 1477 Roger Grenegress.
- 1490 Thomas Foulsham.
- 1507 John Owdolf.
- 1513 John Makins.
- 1542 William Smith.
- 15... Richard Croder.
- 1561 Edward Sharpe.
- 1593 John Nevinson.
- 1602 Wiliam Parrye.
- 1633 Henry Julian. (Appointed 1633, Subscribed 1662, died 1671).
- 1640 ........ Drury. ) minister?
- 16... Thomas Dockwra. ) minister?
- 1671 Cuthbert Norris.
- 1697 Isaac Laughton.
- 1719 George Hill.
- 1721 Charles Trimmel.
- 1723 William Adams.
- 1742 Robert Goodwyn.
- 1789 Christopher Taylor.
- 1820 William Colby.
- 1860 Henry Joseph Muskett.
- 1897 Alfred William Lovely Rivett.
- 1918 Owen Manby.
- 1931 Bernard Milner Pickering.
- 1935 William James Hughes Sinett.
- 1946 Harry Woodfield Davies.
- 1954 Edward Hamley Turtle.
- 1957 William Graham Brooking Snell.
- 1980 Robin Howard Elphick.
- 1985 Kenneth Newton.
- 1990 Christopher Cousins.
- 1992 Peter Stanley Paine.
- 1997 (Hon. Asst, Curate in tandem with P. Paine) Daphne Marcelle Bradford.
- 2005 Jeanette Crafer.
- 2007 (In tandem with J. Crafer) Sandra Helen Mitchell)

== Governance ==
Clippesby is part of the electoral ward of West Flegg for local elections and is part of the district of Great Yarmouth.

The village's national constituency is Great Yarmouth which has been represented by the Reform UK's Rupert Lowe MP since 2024.

== War Memorial ==
Clippesby's war memorial is located inside St. Peter's Church and is a framed paper memorial which lists the following names for the First World War:

Rank	Name	Unit	Date of death	Burial
LSgt.	Alfred Gowing	7th Bn., Norfolk Regiment	13 Oct. 1915	Loos Memorial
Dvr.	William F. Shearing	3rd Pontoon Park, Royal Engineers	29 Oct. 1918	Foreste Cemetery
Pte.	Frederick G. Gowing	1/4th Bn., Norfolk Regiment	26 Apr. 1917	Kantara Cemetery

There is no memorial for the fallen of the Second World War, but the following are buried in St. Peter's Cemetery:

Rank	Name	Unit	Date of death
A1C	Alfred Percy Cooper	Royal Air Force	19 June 1940
Vol.	Frank Robert Paul	11th (Norfolk) Bn., Home Guard	18 March 1942
