= Great Yarmouth Borough Council elections =

Local government elections in Norfolk, England

Great Yarmouth Borough Council elections are held every four years to elect Great Yarmouth Borough Council in Norfolk, England. Since the last boundary changes in 2004, 39 councillors have been elected from 17 wards. Prior to 2019 elections were held three years out of every four for a third of the council at a time.

Great Yarmouth rejected the introduction of a directly elected mayor by 15,595 votes to 10,051 in a referendum in 2011, held at the same time as the 2011 election.

== Council elections ==
Composition of the council
Year	Con	Lab	LD (Note: Includes totals for the predecessors of the Liberal Democrats, the Liberal Party and SDP (both of which participated in the Alliance).)	UKIP	Independents & Others	Council control after election
Local government reorganisation; council established (48 seats)
1973	26	16	1	–	5	Conservative
1976	31	13	2	–	2	Conservative
1979	26	17	2	–	3	Conservative
New ward boundaries (48 seats)
1980	20	23	2	–	3	No overall control
1982	22	20	5	–	1	No overall control
1983	26	18	4	–	0	Conservative
1984	26	18	4	–	0	Conservative
1986	24	22	2	–	0	No overall control
1987	24	22	2	–	0	No overall control
1988	23	24	1	–	0	No overall control
1990	18	30	0	–	0	Labour
1991	15	32	1	–	0	Labour
1992	18	29	1	–	0	Labour
1994	19	27	2	0	0	Labour
1995	14	33	1	0	0	Labour
1996	9	38	1	0	0	Labour
1998	12	36	0	0	0	Labour
1999	19	29	0	0	0	Labour
2000	26	22	0	0	0	Conservative
2002	28	20	0	0	0	Conservative
2003	26	22	0	0	0	Conservative
New ward boundaries (39 seats)
2004	26	13	0	0	0	Conservative
2006	22	16	0	0	1	Conservative
2007	22	17	0	0	0	Conservative
2008	24	15	0	0	0	Conservative
2010	24	15	0	0	0	Conservative
2011	24	15	0	0	0	Conservative
2012	18	21	0	0	0	Labour
2014	14	15	0	10	0	No overall control
2015	14	14	0	11	0	No overall control
2016	14	11	0	14	0	No overall control
2018	23	15	0	1	0	Conservative
Change to all out elections (39 seats)
2019	20	15	0	1	3	Conservative
2023	19	18	0	0	2	No overall control

== Borough result maps ==
2004 results map

2006 results map

2007 results map

2008 results map

2010 results map

2011 results map

2012 results map

2014 results map

2015 results map

2016 results map

2018 results map

2019 results map

2023 results map

== By-election results ==
=== 1997–2001 ===
Caister North By-Election 16 October 1997
Party	Candidate	Votes	%	±%
Labour		477	58.7	−3.7
Conservative		287	35.3	−2.3
Liberal Democrats		49	6.0	+6.0
Majority		190	23.4	
Turnout		813		
Labour hold		Swing		

Caister South By-Election 16 October 1997
Party	Candidate	Votes	%	±%
Conservative		503	50.1	+13.5
Labour		381	38.0	−16.6
Liberal Democrats		83	8.3	−0.6
Independent		36	3.6	+3.6
Majority		122	12.1	
Turnout		1,003		
Conservative gain from Labour		Swing		

Lothingland By-Election 24 February 2000
Party	Candidate	Votes	%	±%
Conservative		505	52.9	−3.4
Labour		306	32.1	−11.6
Liberal Democrats		143	15.0	+15.0
Majority		199	20.8	
Turnout		954	22.7	
Conservative hold		Swing		

Bradwell South and Hopton By-Election 22 February 2001
Party	Candidate	Votes	%	±%
Conservative		644	53.1	−3.7
Labour		568	46.9	+12.7
Majority		76	6.2	
Turnout		1,212	24.7	
Conservative hold		Swing		

=== 2005–2009 ===
Claydon By-Election 5 May 2005
Party	Candidate	Votes	%	±%
Labour	Richard Barker	1,588	53.6	
Conservative	David Denning	796	26.9	
Liberal Democrats	Nicholas Dyer	382	12.9	
UKIP	Michael Dix	196	6.6	
Majority		792	26.7	
Turnout		2,962		
Labour hold		Swing		

Gorleston By-Election 4 August 2005
Party	Candidate	Votes	%	±%
Conservative	John Burroughs	369	39.2	
Liberal Democrats	Ivan Lees	278	29.6	
Labour	Peter Alexander	242	25.7	
UKIP	Colin Aldred	51	5.4	
Majority		91	9.6	
Turnout		940		
Conservative hold		Swing		

Nelson By-Election 25 October 2007
Party	Candidate	Votes	%	±%
Labour	Brenda Taylor	329	42.5	+0.1
Independent	William Robinson	257	33.2	+33.2
Liberal Democrats	Nicholas Dyer	96	12.4	+12.4
Independent	Thomas Holmes	49	6.3	+6.3
Green	Ian Holman	43	5.6	−1.8
Majority		72	9.3	
Turnout		774		
Labour hold		Swing		

Bradwell South and Hopton By-Election 7 February 2008
Party	Candidate	Votes	%	±%
Conservative	Susan Hacon	475	37.4	−15.8
Liberal Democrats	Aleck Buchanan	397	31.2	+31.2
Labour	Joanne Vriesema	254	20.0	−7.9
UKIP	Colin Aldred	116	9.1	−9.8
Green	Ian Holman	29	2.3	+2.3
Majority		78	6.2	
Turnout		1,271		
Conservative hold		Swing		

Bradwell South and Hopton By-Election 10 July 2008
Party	Candidate	Votes	%	±%
Conservative	Michael Butcher	623	50.0	+2.0
Labour	Trevor Wainwright	429	34.4	+15.2
UKIP	Colin Aldred	196	15.7	+5.3
Majority		194	15.6	
Turnout		1,248	24.9	
Conservative hold		Swing		

=== 2009–2013 ===
St Andrews By-Election 23 June 2011
Party	Candidate	Votes	%	±%
Labour	Marlene Fairhead	424	51.4	−0.9
Conservative	Carl Smith	401	48.6	+0.9
Majority		23	2.8	
Turnout		825	24.2	
Labour gain from Conservative		Swing		

Bradwell South and Hopton By-Election 20 October 2011
Party	Candidate	Votes	%	±%
Conservative	Martin Plane	557	49.6	+3.4
Labour	Hilary Wainwright	407	36.2	+0.3
UKIP	Colin Aldred	159	14.2	+1.4
Majority		150	13.4	
Turnout		1,123	21.0	
Conservative hold		Swing		

=== 2019–2023 ===
Claydon By-Election 6 May 2021
Party	Candidate	Votes	%	±%
Conservative	Bob Price	728	52.9	+16.6
Labour	Jo Thurtle	648	47.1	−16.6
Majority		80	5.8	
Turnout		1,376		
Conservative gain from Labour		Swing		

Ormesby By-Election 6 May 2021
Party	Candidate	Votes	%	±%
Conservative	Ron Hanton	939	74.6	+34.6
Labour	Alison Green	320	25.4	+12.6
Majority		619	49.2	
Turnout		1,259		
Conservative gain from Independent		Swing		

=== 2023–2027 ===
Central and Northgate By-Election 29 February 2024
Party	Candidate	Votes	%	±%
Labour	James Dwyer-McCluskey	482	52.6	
Conservative	Paul Hammond	296	32.3	
Liberal Democrats	Tony Harris	139	15.2	
Majority		186	20.3	
Turnout		917		
Labour hold		Swing		

Caister South By-Election 7 May 2026
Party	Candidate	Votes	%	±%
Great Yarmouth First	Jon Wedon	866	48.7	
Reform	Sandra Sherman-Ceesay	405	22.8	
Conservative	Ann Lawn	214	12.0	
Green	Ollie Hodds	139	7.8	
Labour	Chris Williamson	116	6.5	
Liberal Democrats	Nick Dyer	39	2.2	
Majority		461	25.9	
Turnout		1,779		
Great Yarmouth First gain from Conservative		Swing		
