= Blofield and Flegg Rural District =

Former adjacent rural districts in Norfolk, England

Coordinates: 52.63°N 1.55°E

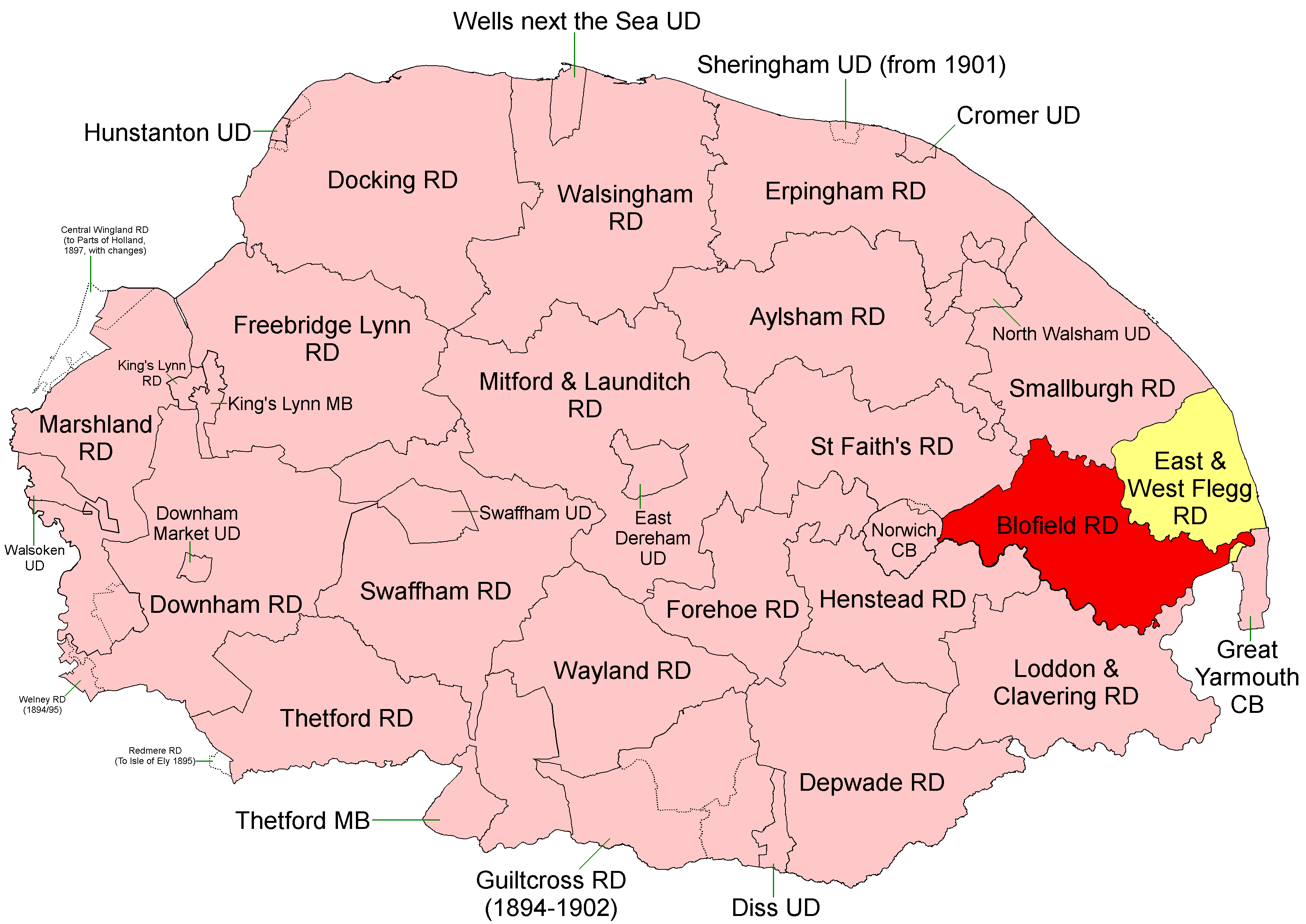
Boundaries in 1894. Blofield RD in red, East and West Flegg RD yellow.

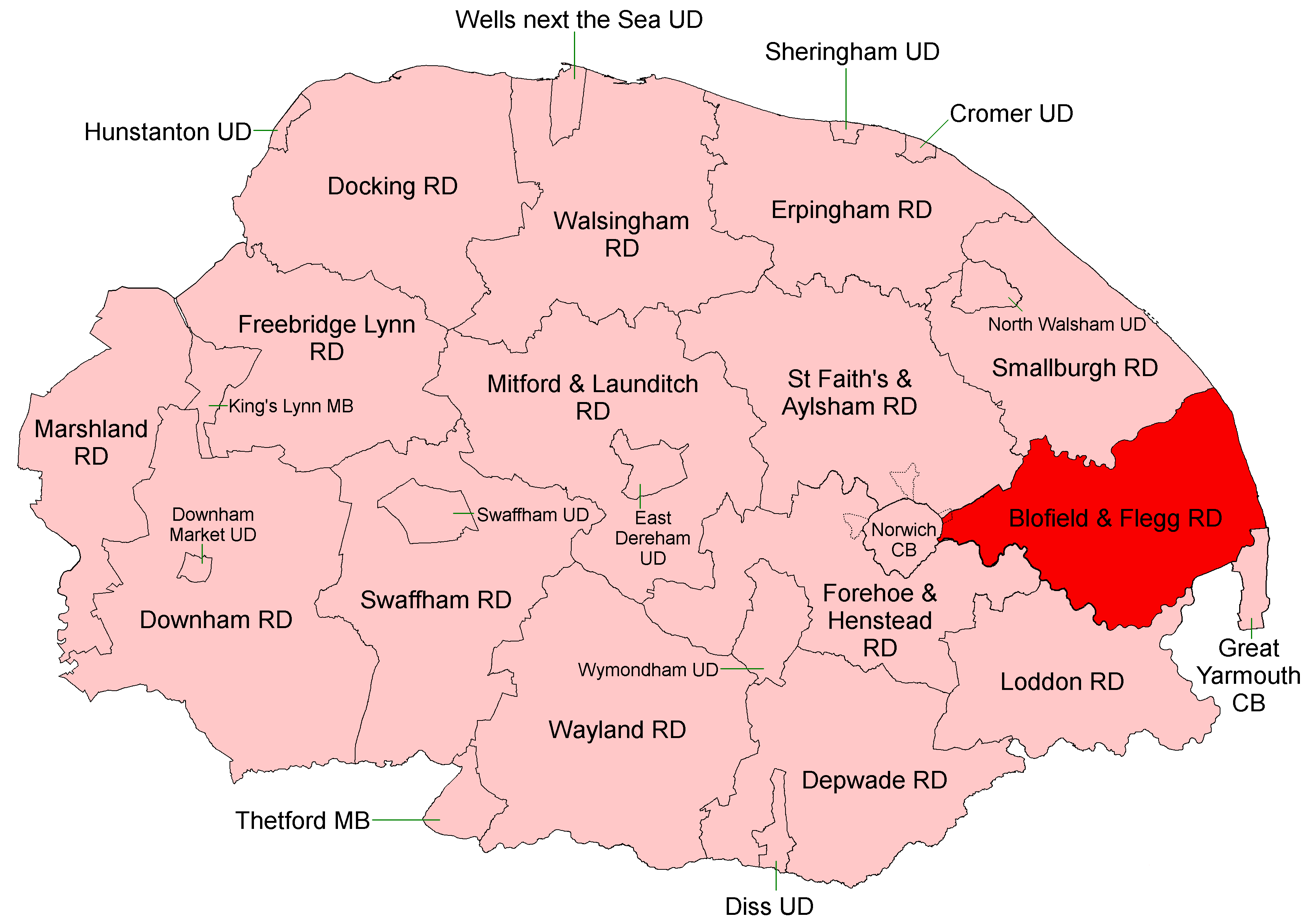
Boundaries in 1935

Blofield and East and West Flegg Rural Districts were adjacent rural districts in Norfolk, England from 1894 to 1935.

They were formed under the Local Government Act 1894 based on rural sanitary districts of the same names, and lay between Norwich and Great Yarmouth. East and West Flegg RD included a detached portion, itself an outlying part of Runham parish.

In 1935 the two districts, with very minor changes around Great Yarmouth, were merged to form Blofield and Flegg Rural District. Subsequently, changes to the border with Norwich County Borough were made in 1951.

In 1974, the merged district was abolished under the Local Government Act 1972, and became mainly part of the Broadland district, with a small part being added to the Borough of Great Yarmouth.

== Statistics ==
| Year | Blofield RD | | | East and West Flegg RD | | |
| Year | Area (ha) | Population | Density (pop/ha) | Area (ha) | Population | Density (pop/ha) |
|---|---|---|---|---|---|---|
| 1911 | 18,528 | 12,159 | 0.66 | 11,732 | 9,929 | 0.85 |
| 1921 | 18,528 | 12,410 | 0.67 | 11,732 | 10,311 | 0.88 |
| 1931 | 18,528 | 14,415 | 0.78 | 11,732 | 10,159 | 0.87 |
| | Blofield and Flegg RD | | | | | |
| 1951 | 30,162 | 32,113 | 1.06 | | | |
| 1961 | 30,162 | 34,954 | 1.16 | | | |

== Parishes ==
These parishes operated within Blofield and Flegg RD unless otherwise indicated.

| Parish | From | To | Notes |
|---|---|---|---|
| Acle | | | Blofield RD |
| Ashby with Oby | | | East and West Flegg RD |
| Beighton | | | Blofield RD |
| Billockby | | 1935 | East and West Flegg RD. Component of Fleggburgh |
| Blofield | | | Blofield RD |
| Brundall | | | Blofield RD |
| Burgh St Margaret | | 1935 | East and West Flegg RD. Component of Fleggburgh |
| Burlingham | 1935 | | Merger of 3 Burlinghams and Lingwood |
| Burlingham St Andrew | | 1935 | Blofield RD. Component of Burlingham |
| Burlingham St Edmund | | 1935 | Blofield RD. Component of Burlingham |
| Burlingham St Peter | | 1935 | Blofield RD. Component of Burlingham |
| Caister Next Yarmouth | | 1926 | East and West Flegg RD. Divided into East and West Caister |
| Cantley | | | Blofield RD |
| Clippesby | | 1935 | East and West Flegg RD. Component of Fleggburgh |
| East Caister | 1926 | | East and West Flegg RD. Known as Caister-on-Sea after 1954 |
| East Somerton | | 1935 | East and West Flegg RD. Component of Somerton |
| Filby | | | East and West Flegg RD |
| Fleggburgh | 1935 | | Merger of Billockby, Burgh St Margaret and Clippesby |
| Freethorpe | | | Blofield RD |
| Great and Little Plumstead | 1935 | | Merger |
| Great Plumstead | | 1935 | Blofield RD. Component of Great and Little Plumstead |
| Halvergate | | | Blofield RD |
| Hassingham | | 1935 | Blofield RD. Added to Strumpshaw |
| Hemblington | | | Blofield RD |
| Hemsby | | | East and West Flegg RD |
| Limpenhoe | | 1935 | Blofield RD. Added to Cantley |
| Lingwood | | 1935 | Blofield RD. Component of Burlingham |
| Little Plumstead | | 1935 | Blofield RD. Component of Great and Little Plumstead |
| Martham | | | East and West Flegg RD |
| Mautby | | | East and West Flegg RD |
| Moulton St Mary | | 1935 | Blofield RD. Divided between Beighton and Reedham |
| Ormesby St Margaret with Scratby | | | East and West Flegg RD |
| Ormesby St Michael | | | East and West Flegg RD |
| Postwick | | | Blofield RD |
| Ranworth with Panxworth | | 1935 | Blofield RD. Added to Woodbastwick |
| Reedham | | | Blofield RD |
| Repps with Bastwick | | | East and West Flegg RD |
| Rollesby | | | East and West Flegg RD |
| Runham | | 1935 | East and West Flegg RD. Divided between Mautby and Reedham |
| Somerton | | | Merger of East and West Somerton |
| South Walsham | 1897 | | Merger of 2 South Walsham parishes |
| South Walsham St Lawrence | | 1897 | Blofield RD. Component of South Walsham |
| South Walsham St Mary | | 1897 | Blofield RD. Component of South Walsham |
| Stokesby with Herringby | | | East and West Flegg RD |
| Strumpshaw | | | Blofield RD |
| Thorpe St Andrew | | | Blofield RD. Also as Thorpe next Norwich |
| Thrigby | | 1935 | East and West Flegg RD. Added to Mautby |
| Thurne | | | East and West Flegg RD |
| Tunstall | | 1935 | Blofield RD. Added to Halvergate |
| Upton with Fishley | | | Blofield RD |
| West Caister | 1926 | | East and West Flegg RD |
| West Somerton | | 1935 | East and West Flegg RD. Component of Somerton |
| Wickhampton | | 1935 | Blofield RD. Added to Freethorpe |
| Winterton on Sea | | | East and West Flegg RD |
| Witton | | 1935 | Blofield RD. Added to Postwick |
| Woodbastwick | | | Blofield RD |
