= Caister, Norfolk =

Caister may refer to several places in the English county of Norfolk:

- the seaside resort of Caister-on-Sea
- the nearby village of West Caister
