= 2004 Great Yarmouth Borough Council election =

2004 UK local government election

Map of the results of the 2004 Great Yarmouth council election. Conservatives in blue and Labour in red.

The 2004 Great Yarmouth Borough Council election took place on 10 June 2004 to elect members of Great Yarmouth Borough Council in Norfolk, England. The whole council was up for election with boundary changes since the last election in 2003 reducing the number of seats by 9. The Conservative Party stayed in overall control of the council.

== Election result ==
Great Yarmouth local election result 2004
Party	Seats	Gains	Losses	Net gain/loss	Seats %	Votes %	Votes	+/−
Conservative	26			0	66.7	51.1	24,289	+6.5%
Labour	13			-9	33.3	43.5	20,692	-4.9%
Liberal Democrats	0			0	0	4.3	2,032	-0.4%
National Front	0			0	0	0.8	378	+0.8%
Legalise Cannabis	0			0	0	0.4	187	+0.4%

== Ward results ==
Bradwell North (3)
Party	Candidate	Votes	%	±%
Labour	Trevor Wainwright	923		
Conservative	James Tate	778		
Conservative	Graham Plant	755		
Conservative	Margaret Greenacre	718		
Labour	Richard Barker	667		
Labour	Sharon Thrasher	594		
Turnout		4,435	37.0	

Bradwell South and Hopton (3)
Party	Candidate	Votes	%	±%
Conservative	Stephen Ames	978		
Conservative	Brian Howard	939		
Conservative	Colin Hodds	914		
Labour	Peter Alexander	603		
Labour	John Holmes	595		
Labour	Michael Pettit	555		
Turnout		4,584	37.5	

Caister North (2)
Party	Candidate	Votes	%	±%
Conservative	Barry Cunniffe	729		
Conservative	Anthony Smith	706		
Labour	Sandra Griffiths	444		
Labour	Nicholas Dack	378		
Liberal Democrats	Nicholas Dyer	257		
Turnout		2,514	39.1	

Caister South (2)
Party	Candidate	Votes	%	±%
Conservative	Susan Lawley	774		
Labour	Patrick Hacon	729		
Conservative	Desmond Sadler	596		
Labour	David Nurse	566		
Turnout		2,665	45.3	

Central and Northgate (3)
Party	Candidate	Votes	%	±%
Labour	Michael Taylor	773		
Labour	Terence Easter	746		
Labour	Michael Castle	736		
Conservative	Richard Delf	719		
Conservative	Gerard Jarvis	632		
Conservative	Peter Meah	588		
Liberal Democrats	Anthony Harris	318		
Turnout		4,512	36.2	

Claydon (3)
Party	Candidate	Votes	%	±%
Labour	Anthony Blyth	954		
Labour	Julie Fitzgerald	871		
Labour	Bernard Williamson	742		
Conservative	David Denning	731		
Turnout		3,298	33.3	

East Flegg (2)
Party	Candidate	Votes	%	±%
Conservative	George Jermany	927		
Conservative	Shirley Weymouth	918		
Labour	Trevor Broadbent	422		
Labour	Derrick Sweeting	341		
Turnout		2,608	41.8	

Fleggburgh
Party	Candidate	Votes	%	±%
Conservative	David Thompson	830	83.8	
Labour	Barry Anderson	161	16.2	
Majority		669	67.6	
Turnout		991	53.4	

Gorleston (2)
Party	Candidate	Votes	%	±%
Conservative	Bertie Collins	860		
Conservative	Jonathan Russell	841		
Liberal Democrats	Ivan Lees	351		
Labour	Della Anverali	311		
Labour	George Smith	291		
Turnout		2,654	42.9	

Lothingland (2)
Party	Candidate	Votes	%	±%
Conservative	Mark Thompson	857		
Conservative	Barry Stone	834		
Labour	Christine Williamson	506		
Turnout		2,197	42.0	

Magdalen (3)
Party	Candidate	Votes	%	±%
Labour	Colleen Walker	826		
Labour	Brian Walker	823		
Conservative	Patricia Page	814		
Labour	Frank Esherwood	745		
Turnout		3,208	34.3	

Nelson (3)
Party	Candidate	Votes	%	±%
Labour	Michael Jeal	589		
Labour	Susan Robinson	564		
Conservative	Joy Cosaitis	501		
Labour	Valerie Pettit	497		
National Front	Thomas Holmes	378		
Liberal Democrats	Michael Tall	360		
Legalise Cannabis	Michael Skipper	187		
Turnout		3,076	31.1	

Ormesby (2)
Party	Candidate	Votes	%	±%
Conservative	Charles Reynolds	921		
Conservative	James Shrimplin	871		
Labour	Thomas Byrne	384		
Turnout		2,176	43.0	

Southtown and Cobholm (2)
Party	Candidate	Votes	%	±%
Labour	Penelope Linden	507		
Conservative	Elizabeth Giles	351		
Labour	Andrew Wassell	348		
Turnout		1,206	28.7	

St Andrews (2)
Party	Candidate	Votes	%	±%
Conservative	Patrick Cook	564		
Conservative	Bryan Watts	536		
Labour	Maria Culmer	528		
Labour	Karen Hewitt	514		
Turnout		2,142	35.6	

West Flegg (2)
Party	Candidate	Votes	%	±%
Conservative	Barry Coleman	921		
Conservative	John Hudson	791		
Liberal Democrats	Pamela Mayhew	381		
Liberal Democrats	Rodney Cole	365		
Labour	James Prior	288		
Turnout		2,746	42.1	

Yarmouth North (2)
Party	Candidate	Votes	%	±%
Conservative	Paul Garrod	720		
Conservative	Robert Peck	675		
Labour	Brenda Taylor	618		
Labour	Ralph Woodock	553		
Turnout		2,566	41.3	
