= Filby Broad =

Lake in Norfolk, England

- Location within Norfolk Location within England Location within the United Kingdom
- Location: Norfolk, England, United Kingdom
- Coordinates: 52.662°N 1.633°E
- Type: Broad

Filby Broad is one of five broads (lakes) in the Trinity Broads in Norfolk, England. It lies within the Broads National Park, adjacent to the village of Filby. The broad has an abundant selection of birds and wildlife.

The lake is connected to Ormesby Broad and Rollesby Broad via a narrow inlet under a road bridge and via the River Bure and the main broads network by a now unnavigable cutting with a lock gate. This cuts the broad off from the main Broadland area and that means there is no water traffic for a majority of the time. As with the other Norfolk broads, Filby is a peat working and is now only about six to eight feet at its deepest. It is approximately half-a-mile long and surrounded on all sides by reed banks and trees, and one end of the Bridges Carrs area of the broad has been given Site of Special Scientific Interest status.

Currently the main use as a body of water is as a reservoir serving the Yarmouth and Broadland areas, owned and operated by the Essex and Suffolk Water Company. There is no public access to the Broad. It has a public boardwalk constructed at the north west side. As a leisure facility the main occupant of the broad is the Norfolk Schools Sailing Association, which has occupied the site since the early 1970s and has built over time a sailing base, slip ways and dinghy park at the north end of the broad. The Association is a voluntary group that provides sailing training to children and adults within the county of Norfolk.

This has created a body of water that has a very restricted level of human access leaving it an ideal spot within the broadland area for nesting birds away from the tourist bustle of the main rivers.
