= Ormesby St Michael =

Village in Norfolk, England

Coordinates: 52.67523°N 1.65966°E

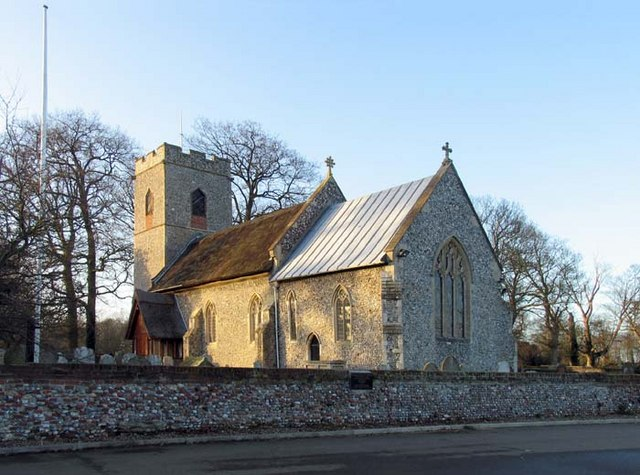
- St Michael, Ormesby St Michael

- Location within Norfolk
- Area: 4.21 km^{2} (1.63 sq mi)
- Population: 302 (2011)
  - Density: 72/km^{2} (190/sq mi)
- OS grid reference: TG475149
- Civil parish: Ormesby St Michael
- District: Great Yarmouth
- Shire county: Norfolk
- Region: East
- Country: England
- Sovereign state: United Kingdom
- Post town: GREAT YARMOUTH
- Postcode district: NR29
- Police: Norfolk
- Fire: Norfolk
- Ambulance: East of England

Ormesby St Michael is a small village and civil parish in the English county of Norfolk. It is situated some 12 km (7.5 mi) north-west of the town of Great Yarmouth and 25 km (16 mi) east of the city of Norwich. Nearby are Ormesby Broad and Ormesby Little Broad, both part of the Trinity Broads within The Broads.

The villages name means 'Omr's farm/settlement'.

The civil parish has an area of 4.21 km^{2} (1.63 sq mi) and in the 2001 census had a population of 297 in 128 households, increasing to 302 at the 2011 Census. For the purposes of local government, the parish falls within the district of Great Yarmouth.

Ormesby Manor is a Grade II listed 19th manor house with an Italianate tower.

Ormesby St Michael should not be mistaken for the village of Ormesby St Margaret, which lies some 3 km (1.9 mi) to the east.
