= Filby =

Village in Norfolk, England

Coordinates: 52.66218°N 1.64525°E

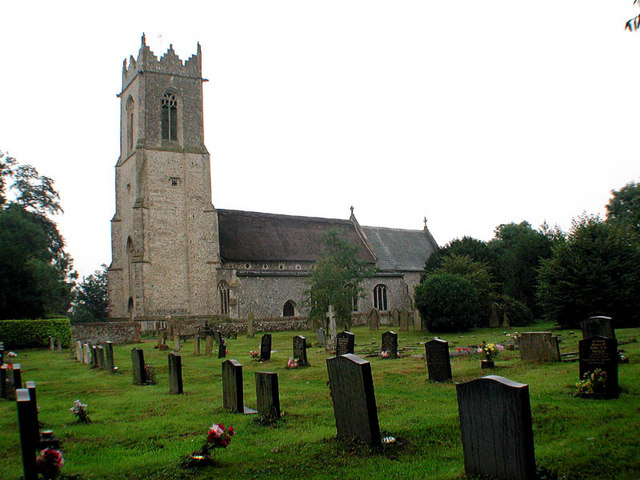
- All Saints' Church, Filby

- Location within Norfolk
- Area: 5.80 km^{2} (2.24 sq mi)
- Population: 765 2011
  - Density: 132/km^{2} (340/sq mi)
- OS grid reference: TG466134
  - London: 109 miles (175 km)
- Civil parish: Filby
- District: Great Yarmouth
- Shire county: Norfolk
- Region: East
- Country: England
- Sovereign state: United Kingdom
- Post town: GREAT YARMOUTH
- Postcode district: NR29
- Dialling code: 01493
- Police: Norfolk
- Fire: Norfolk
- Ambulance: East of England
- UK Parliament: Great Yarmouth

Filby is a village and civil parish in the English of Norfolk. The village is located 4.6 miles (7.4 km) north-west of Great Yarmouth and 15 miles (24 km) east of Norwich, between Filby and Ormesby Little Broads.

== History ==
Filby's name is of mixed Anglo-Saxon and Viking origin deriving from an amalgamation of the Old English and Old Norse for Fili's or Fila's settlement.

In the Domesday Book, Filby is listed as a settlement of 48 households in the hundred of East Flegg. In 1086, the village was divided between the East Anglian estates of William de Warenne, Roger Bigod, St Benet's Abbey, William d'Ecouis and Rabel the Engineer.

Filby Hall is a manor-house dating from the 18th century with a significant remodelling in the 19th century in the Victorian Gothic style. The hall is surrounded by walled gardens with a rare example of a 19th century summerhouse in the Orangery. During the Second World War, the hall was used as a camp for the British Army.

== Geography ==
According to the 2011 Census, Filby has a population of 765 residents living in 328 households. Furthermore, the parish has a total area of 5.80 square kilometres (2.24 mi^{2}).

Filby falls within the constituency of Great Yarmouth and is represented at Parliament by Brandon Lewis MP of the Conservative Party. For the purposes of local government, the parish falls within the district of Great Yarmouth.

== All Saints' Church ==
Filby's parish church was largely constructed in the Fourteenth Century with the tower being completed by the 16th century, the church was also significantly restored in the 19th century. All Saints' is one of Norfolk's few remaining churches with a thatched roof with the font built from Purbeck Marble dating from the 13th century. The stained-glass largely dates from the 19th century and originates from the workshops of Alfred Gerente of Paris, Ward and Hughes and James Powell and Sons.

== Filby Broad ==
Filby Broad is one of the five Trinity Broads and is a Site of Special Scientific Interest with many uncommon species of birds and other wildlife. The broad is fairly shallow, reaching only six to eight feet at its deepest.

== Amenities ==
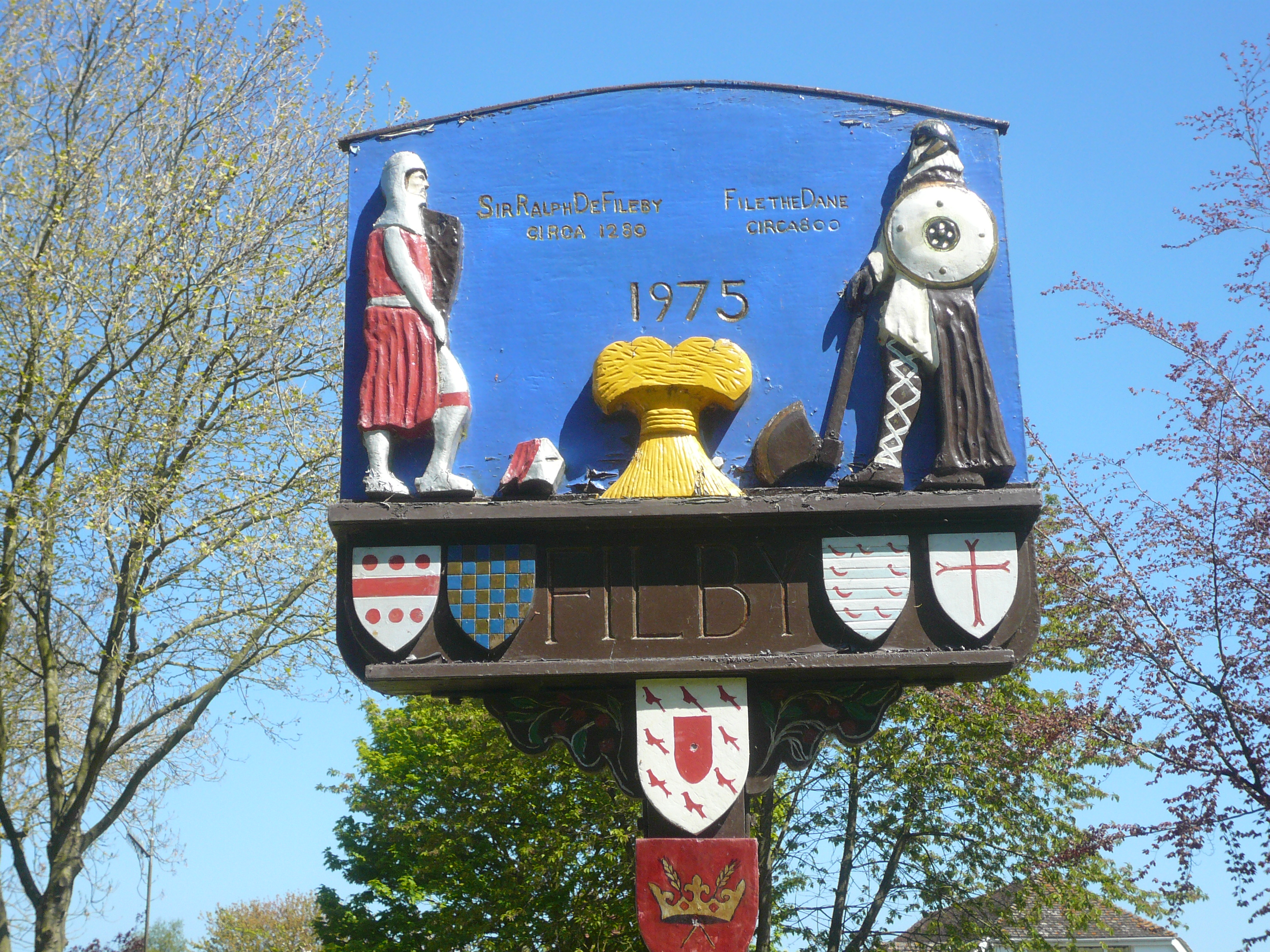
Filby village sign

The majority of local children attend Filby Primary School, which was awarded a 'Good' rating by Ofsted in 2013 which was upheld in 2017. The school is part of the Evolution Academy Trust.

Filby has a strong community ethos, and in 2002 won the 'Small Village' category in the Britain in Bloom competition.
