= 2019 Great Yarmouth Borough Council election =

2019 UK local government election

- 2 May 2019

All 39 seats to Great Yarmouth Borough Council 20 seats needed for a majority

| | First party | Second party |
|---|---|---|
| Party | Conservative | Labour |
| Last election | 23 seats, 49.4% | 15 seats, 39.8% |
| Seats won | 20 | 15 |
| Seat change | ▼3 | Steady |
| Popular vote | 19,207 | 13,453 |
| Percentage | 52.2% | 36.6% |
| Swing | ▲2.8% | ▼3.2% |
| | Third party | Fourth party |
| Party | Independent | UKIP |
| Last election | N/A | 1 seat, 5.5% |
| Seats won | 3 | 1 |
| Seat change | ▲3 | Steady |
| Popular vote | 2,803 | 992 |
| Percentage | 7.6% | 2.7% |
| Swing | N/A | ▼2.3% |
- Winner of each seat at the 2019 Great Yarmouth Borough Council election
Council control before election
Conservative
Council control after election
Conservative

The 2019 Great Yarmouth Borough Council election took place on 2 May 2019 to elect members of Great Yarmouth Borough Council in England. This was on the same day as other local elections in England.

== Summary ==
=== Election result ===
2019 Great Yarmouth Borough Council election
| Party | Candidates | Seats | Gains | Losses | Net gain/loss | Seats % | Votes % | Votes | +/− |
|---|---|---|---|---|---|---|---|---|---|
| Conservative | 39 | 20 | 0 | 3 | ▼3 | 51.3 | 52.2 | 19,207 | +2.8 |
| Labour | 29 | 15 | 0 | 0 | Steady | 38.5 | 36.6 | 13,453 | –3.2 |
| Independent | 4 | 3 | 3 | 0 | ▲3 | 7.7 | 7.6 | 2,803 | N/A |
| UKIP | 3 | 1 | 0 | 0 | Steady | 2.6 | 2.7 | 992 | –2.8 |
| Democrats and Veterans | 1 | 0 | 0 | 0 | Steady | 0.0 | 0.8 | 309 | N/A |

== Ward results ==
The results for each ward were as follows.

=== Bradwell North ===
Bradwell North
| Party | Candidate | Votes | % | ±% |
|---|---|---|---|---|
| Conservative | Graham Plant | 904 | 59.6 | |
| Conservative | Carl Smith | 817 | 53.9 | |
| Conservative | Daniel Candon | 702 | 46.3 | |
| Labour | Joanne Thurtle | 670 | 44.2 | |
| Majority | | 32 | 2.1 | / |
| Turnout | | 1,583 | 30.6 | |
| Rejected ballots | | 66 | 4.2 | |
| Registered electors | | 5,178 | | |
| Conservative hold | | Swing | | |
| Conservative hold | | Swing | | |
| Conservative hold | | Swing | | |

=== Bradwell South and Hopton ===
Bradwell South and Hopton
| Party | Candidate | Votes | % | ±% |
|---|---|---|---|---|
| Conservative | Carl Annison | 954 | 66.3 | |
| Conservative | Sue Hacon | 785 | 54.6 | |
| Conservative | Kathryn Stenhouse | 736 | 51.1 | |
| Labour | David Greggs | 511 | 35.5 | |
| Majority | | 225 | 15.6 | / |
| Turnout | | 1,558 | 27.4 | |
| Rejected ballots | | 119 | 7.6 | |
| Registered electors | | 5,691 | | |
| Conservative hold | | Swing | | |
| Conservative hold | | Swing | | |
| Conservative hold | | Swing | | |

=== Caister North ===
Caister North
| Party | Candidate | Votes | % | ±% |
|---|---|---|---|---|
| Conservative | Penny Carpenter | 601 | 62.6 | |
| Conservative | Graham Carpenter | 600 | 62.5 | |
| Labour | Andrew Booth | 336 | 35.0 | |
| Majority | | 264 | 27.5 | / |
| Turnout | | 1,030 | 28.5 | |
| Rejected ballots | | 70 | 6.8 | |
| Registered electors | | 3,612 | | |
| Conservative hold | | Swing | | |
| Conservative hold | | Swing | | |

=== Caister South ===
Caister South
| Party | Candidate | Votes | % | ±% |
|---|---|---|---|---|
| Conservative | Brian Lawn | 637 | 63.7 | |
| Conservative | Malcolm Bird | 608 | 60.8 | |
| Labour | Alison Green | 369 | 36.9 | |
| Labour | Ivan Ammon | 305 | 30.5 | |
| Majority | | 239 | 23.9 | / |
| Turnout | | 1,056 | 28.8 | |
| Rejected ballots | | 56 | 5.3 | |
| Registered electors | | 3,671 | | |
| Conservative hold | | Swing | | |
| Conservative hold | | Swing | | |

=== Central and Northgate ===
Central and Northgate
| Party | Candidate | Votes | % | ±% |
|---|---|---|---|---|
| Labour | Michael Smith-Clare | 528 | 41.5 | |
| Labour | Jade Martin | 485 | 38.2 | |
| UKIP | Carrie Talbot | 453 | 35.6 | |
| Labour | John Simmons | 438 | 34.5 | |
| Independent | Christopher Walch | 422 | 33.2 | |
| Conservative | Philip Grimmer | 287 | 22.6 | |
| Conservative | Karen Pollard | 270 | 21.2 | |
| Conservative | Ayeshia Young | 207 | 16.3 | |
| Majority | | 15 | 1.1 | / |
| Turnout | | 1,285 | 23.5 | |
| Rejected ballots | | 14 | 1.1 | |
| Registered electors | | 5,468 | | |
| Labour hold | | Swing | | |
| Labour hold | | Swing | | |
| UKIP hold | | Swing | | |

=== Claydon ===
Claydon
| Party | Candidate | Votes | % | ±% |
|---|---|---|---|---|
| Labour | Carol Borg | 659 | 61.6 | |
| Labour | Cara Walker | 594 | 55.5 | |
| Labour | Bernard Williamson | 569 | 53.2 | |
| Conservative | Alan Popham | 376 | 35.1 | |
| Conservative | Lionel O'Dell | 354 | 33.1 | |
| Conservative | Gary Boyd | 319 | 29.8 | |
| Majority | | 193 | 18.1 | / |
| Turnout | | 1,164 | 21.5 | |
| Rejected ballots | | 94 | 8.1 | |
| Registered electors | | 5,411 | | |
| Labour hold | | Swing | | |
| Labour hold | | Swing | | |
| Labour hold | | Swing | | |

=== East Flegg ===
East Flegg
| Party | Candidate | Votes | % | ±% |
|---|---|---|---|---|
| Conservative | James Bensly | 876 | 74.2 | |
| Conservative | Noel Galer | 707 | 59.9 | |
| Labour | Harriet Thomas-Bush | 329 | 27.9 | |
| Majority | | 378 | 32.0 | / |
| Turnout | | 1,250 | 31.6 | |
| Rejected ballots | | 69 | 5.5 | |
| Registered electors | | 3,957 | | |
| Conservative hold | | Swing | | |
| Conservative hold | | Swing | | |

=== Fleggburgh ===
Fleggburgh
| Party | Candidate | Votes | % | ±% |
|---|---|---|---|---|
| Independent | Adrian Thompson | 1,050 | 84.1 | +84.1 |
| Conservative | Haydn Thirtle | 151 | 12.1 | −40.4 |
| Labour | Claire Wardley | 47 | 3.8 | −8.4 |
| Majority | | 899 | 72.0 | / |
| Turnout | | 1,251 | 57.7 | |
| Rejected ballots | | 3 | 0.2 | |
| Registered electors | | 2,168 | | |
| Independent gain from Conservative | | Swing | | |

=== Gorleston ===
Gorleston
| Party | Candidate | Votes | % | ±% |
|---|---|---|---|---|
| Conservative | Emma Flaxman-Taylor | 751 | 59.1 | |
| Conservative | Paul Wells | 738 | 58.1 | |
| Labour | Ronald Upton | 489 | 38.5 | |
| Majority | | 249 | 19.6 | / |
| Turnout | | 1,347 | 33.2 | |
| Rejected ballots | | 77 | 5.7 | |
| Registered electors | | 4,053 | | |
| Conservative hold | | Swing | | |
| Conservative hold | | Swing | | |

=== Lothingland ===
Lothingland
| Party | Candidate | Votes | % | ±% |
|---|---|---|---|---|
| Independent | Adrian Myers | 631 | 50.9 | |
| Conservative | Tracy Cameron | 579 | 46.7 | |
| Conservative | David Drewitt | 450 | 36.3 | |
| Labour | Hilary Williams | 315 | 25.4 | |
| Majority | | 129 | 10.4 | / |
| Turnout | | 1,262 | 29.1 | |
| Rejected ballots | | 22 | 1.7 | |
| Registered electors | | 4,330 | | |
| Independent gain from Conservative | | Swing | | |
| Conservative hold | | Swing | | |

=== Magdalen ===
Magdalen
| Party | Candidate | Votes | % | ±% |
|---|---|---|---|---|
| Labour | Trevor Wainwright | 734 | 61.3 | |
| Labour | Colleen Walker | 708 | 59.1 | |
| Labour | Brian Walker | 685 | 57.2 | |
| Conservative | Patricia Page | 428 | 35.7 | |
| Conservative | Natasha Allen | 384 | 32.1 | |
| Conservative | Elizabeth Odam | 337 | 28.1 | |
| Majority | | 257 | 21.5 | / |
| Turnout | | 1,276 | 24.7 | |
| Rejected ballots | | 78 | 6.1 | |
| Registered electors | | 5,176 | | |
| Labour hold | | Swing | | |
| Labour hold | | Swing | | |
| Labour hold | | Swing | | |

=== Nelson ===
Nelson
| Party | Candidate | Votes | % | ±% |
|---|---|---|---|---|
| Labour | Michael Jeal | 586 | 52.5 | |
| Labour | Anthony Wright | 568 | 50.9 | |
| Labour | Kerry Robinson-Payne | 528 | 47.3 | |
| UKIP | Michael Riley | 291 | 26.1 | |
| UKIP | Saul Smith | 248 | 22.2 | |
| Conservative | Margaret Farrow | 211 | 18.9 | |
| Conservative | George Rogers | 172 | 15.4 | |
| Conservative | Lynn Stock | 165 | 14.8 | |
| Majority | | 237 | 21.2 | / |
| Turnout | | 1,140 | 21.7 | |
| Rejected ballots | | 23 | 2.0 | |
| Registered electors | | 5,245 | | |
| Labour hold | | Swing | | |
| Labour hold | | Swing | | |
| Labour hold | | Swing | | |

=== Ormesby ===
Ormesby
| Party | Candidate | Votes | % | ±% |
|---|---|---|---|---|
| Independent | Steven Scott-Greenard | 700 | 57.9 | |
| Conservative | Geoffrey Freeman | 593 | 49.0 | |
| Conservative | Ronald Hanton | 460 | 38.0 | |
| Labour | Craig Guy | 189 | 15.6 | |
| Majority | | 133 | 11.0 | / |
| Turnout | | 1,226 | 34.5 | |
| Rejected ballots | | 17 | 1.4 | |
| Registered electors | | 3,549 | | |
| Independent gain from Conservative | | Swing | | |
| Conservative hold | | Swing | | |

=== Southtown and Cobholm ===
Southtown and Cobholm
| Party | Candidate | Votes | % | ±% |
|---|---|---|---|---|
| Labour | Catherine Cordiner-Achenbach | 344 | 60.7 | |
| Labour | Paula Waters-Bunn | 319 | 56.3 | |
| Conservative | Thomas Allen | 188 | 33.2 | |
| Conservative | Robert Whitaker | 159 | 28.0 | |
| Majority | | 131 | 23.9 | / |
| Turnout | | 655 | 18.1 | |
| Rejected ballots | | 88 | 13.4 | |
| Registered electors | | 3,618 | | |
| Labour hold | | Swing | | |
| Labour hold | | Swing | | |

=== St Andrews ===
St Andrews
| Party | Candidate | Votes | % | ±% |
|---|---|---|---|---|
| Labour | Marlene Fairhead | 521 | 61.2 | |
| Labour | Barbara Wright | 511 | 60.0 | |
| Conservative | Max Peace | 308 | 36.2 | |
| Conservative | Ann Lawn | 304 | 35.7 | |
| Majority | | 203 | 23.8 | / |
| Turnout | | 908 | 25.8 | |
| Rejected ballots | | 56 | 6.2 | |
| Registered electors | | 3,525 | | |
| Labour hold | | Swing | | |
| Labour hold | | Swing | | |

=== West Flegg ===
West Flegg
| Party | Candidate | Votes | % | ±% |
|---|---|---|---|---|
| Conservative | Andrew Grant | 678 | 60.7 | |
| Conservative | Leslie Mogford | 641 | 57.4 | |
| Labour | Edward Bush | 413 | 37.0 | |
| Majority | | 228 | 20.4 | / |
| Turnout | | 1,203 | 29.4 | |
| Rejected ballots | | 86 | 7.1 | |
| Registered electors | | 4,092 | | |
| Conservative hold | | Swing | | |
| Conservative hold | | Swing | | |

=== Yarmouth North ===
Yarmouth North
| Party | Candidate | Votes | % | ±% |
|---|---|---|---|---|
| Conservative | Donna Hammond | 395 | 37.8 | |
| Conservative | Paul Hammond | 375 | 35.9 | |
| Labour | Sandra Lysaght | 373 | 35.7 | |
| Labour | James Borg | 330 | 31.5 | |
| Democrats and Veterans | David Harding | 309 | 29.5 | |
| Majority | | 2 | 0.2 | / |
| Turnout | | 1,076 | 31.0 | |
| Rejected ballots | | 30 | 2.8 | |
| Registered electors | | 3,473 | | |
| Conservative hold | | Swing | | |
| Conservative hold | | Swing | | |

== Changes 2019–2023 ==
- Sue Hacon (Bradwell South and Hopton), elected as a Conservative, stood for re-election in 2023 as an independent.
- Carrie Talbot (Central and Northgate), elected as a UKIP councillor, stood for re-election in 2023 as an independent.

=== By-elections ===
==== Claydon ====
A by-election was held on 6 May 2021 to fill a vacancy in Claydon ward. The Conservatives gained the seat from Labour.

Claydon by-election: 6 May 2021
| Party | Candidate | Votes | % | ±% |
|---|---|---|---|---|
| Conservative | Bob Price | 728 | 52.9 | |
| Labour | Jo Thurtle | 648 | 47.1 | |
| Majority | | 80 | 5.8 | |
| Turnout | | 1,395 | 25.1 | |
| Rejected ballots | | 19 | 1.4 | |
| Registered electors | | 5,549 | | |
| Conservative gain from Labour | | | | |

==== Ormesby ====
A by-election was held on 6 May 2021 to fill a vacancy in Ormesby ward. The Conservatives gained the seat from an independent.

Ormesby by-election: 6 May 2021
| Party | Candidate | Votes | % | ±% |
|---|---|---|---|---|
| Conservative | Ron Hanton | 939 | 74.6 | |
| Labour | Alison Green | 320 | 25.4 | |
| Majority | | 619 | 49.2 | |
| Turnout | | 1,277 | 33.4 | |
| Rejected ballots | | 18 | 1.4 | |
| Registered electors | | 3,820 | | |
| Conservative gain from Independent | | | | |
