= 2015 Great Yarmouth Borough Council election =

2015 UK local government election

Results of the 2015 Great Yarmouth Borough Council election

The 2015 Great Yarmouth Borough Council election took place on 7 May 2015 to elect just under one third of members of Great Yarmouth Borough Council in England as one of the English local elections coinciding with the 2015 General Election, four of the smaller wards of the 17 forming the borough (which had fewer than 3 members each) had no election in 2015. A second-tier local authority, an election is held in three years out of four (on the by-thirds basis) electing councillors for a four-year term - in the year without elections the all-out elections to the top-tier local authority, Norfolk County Council are held.

== Election results ==
No gains from any party group to any other took place across the 13 seats up for election: 8 held by the Conservatives and 5 were held by Labour. The council remained in no overall control of any single party grouping and local Labour councillors continued to form the single largest group.

Great Yarmouth Borough Council Election, 2015
Party	Seats	Gains	Losses	Net gain/loss	Seats %	Votes %	Votes	+/−
Labour	15	0	0	0	38.0	28.7	10,137	
Conservative	14	0	0	0	36.0	36.3	12,833	
UKIP	10	0	0	0	26.0	29.1	10,277	
Green	0	0	0	0	0.0	5.1	1,793	
Independent	0	0	0	0	0.0	0.9	305	

== Ward results ==
=== Bradwell North ===
Bradwell North
Party	Candidate	Votes	%	±%
Conservative	Carl Smith	1,549	44.0	+5.2
UKIP	Maurice Joel	995	28.2	−7.5
Labour	Christina Horne	829	23.5	−2.1
Green	Brian Callan	151	4.3	+4.3
Majority				
Turnout				
Conservative hold		Swing		

=== Bradwell South and Hopton ===
Bradwell South and Hopton
Party	Candidate	Votes	%	±%
Conservative	Andrew Grant	1,414	40.4	+12.3
UKIP	Susan Hacon	1,073	30.7	−18.4
Labour	Colleen Walker	882	25.2	+2.4
Green	Kenneth Peterson	130	3.7	+3.7
Majority				
Turnout				
Conservative hold		Swing		

=== Caister North ===
Caister North
Party	Candidate	Votes	%	±%
Conservative	Penelope Carpenter	964	40.0	+6.5
UKIP	Lynne Connell	777	32.3	−5.7
Labour	Gary Boyd	547	22.7	−0.8
Green	Sarah Bloomfield	122	5.1	0.0
Majority				
Turnout				
Conservative hold		Swing		

=== Caister South ===
Caister South
Party	Candidate	Votes	%	±%
Conservative	Demetris Mavroudis	872	34.8	+8.4
UKIP	Paul Hammond	824	32.8	−7.4
Labour	Gillian Himpleman	662	26.4	+0.5
Green	Harry Webb	150	6.0	−1.5
Majority				
Turnout				
Conservative hold		Swing		

=== Central and Northgate ===
Central and Northgate
Party	Candidate	Votes	%	±%
Labour	Leanne Davis	1,141	38.4	+6.7
UKIP	Christopher Walch	978	32.9	−13.4
Conservative	Emma Flaxman-Taylor	731	24.6	+8.2
Green	Michael Jarvis	110	3.7	−1.9
Patriotic Socialist Party	Matthew McDonnell	11	0.4	+0.4
Majority				
Turnout				
Labour hold		Swing		

=== Claydon ===
Claydon
Party	Candidate	Votes	%	±%
Labour	Bernard Williamson	1,182	37.5	−1.1
UKIP	Philip Grimmer	939	29.8	−13.3
Conservative	Margaret Greenacre	876	27.8	+9.4
Green	Amanda Webb	154	4.9	+4.9
Majority				
Turnout				
Labour hold		Swing		

=== Fleggburgh ===
Fleggburgh
Party	Candidate	Votes	%	±%
Conservative	Haydn Thirtle	781	52.5	−28.6
UKIP	Emma Swann	279	18.8	+18.8
Green	Charlotte Eve	245	16.5	+16.5
Labour	Brian Pilkington	182	12.2	−6.7
Majority				
Turnout				
Conservative hold		Swing		

=== Lothingland ===
Lothingland
Party	Candidate	Votes	%	±%
Conservative	Brian Lawn	1,199	42.8	+4.4
UKIP	Matthew Dinsdale	934	33.3	−8.7
Labour	Christine Williamson	561	20.0	+0.4
Green	Tracey White	110	3.9	+3.9
Majority				
Turnout				
Conservative hold		Swing		

=== Magdalen ===
Magdalen
Party	Candidate	Votes	%	±%
Labour	Brain Walker	1,308	41.7	−3.5
UKIP	Michael Monk	871	27.8	−7.9
Conservative	Kevin Vaughan	840	26.8	+7.8
Green	Aidan Rump-Smith	116	3.7	+3.7
Majority				
Turnout				
Labour hold		Swing		

=== Nelson ===
Nelson
Party	Candidate	Votes	%	±%
Labour	Kerry Robinson-Payne	1,155	44.9	+5.3
UKIP	Lorraine Lodge	801	31.2	−11.0
Conservative	George Rogers	509	19.8	+7.5
Green	Diana Freshwater	105	4.1	−1.7
Majority				
Turnout				
Labour hold		Swing		

=== Ormesby ===
Ormesby
Party	Candidate	Votes	%	±%
Conservative	Ronald Hanton	997	40.6	−8.4
UKIP	Clayton Greene	624	25.4	−2.3
Labour	Jonh Simmons	425	17.3	−6.0
Independent	James Shrimplin	305	12.4	+12.4
Green	John Mallett	102	4.2	+4.2
Majority				
Turnout				
Conservative hold		Swing		

=== St. Andrew's ===
St. Andrew's
Party	Candidate	Votes	%	±%
Labour	Barbara Wright	764	36.3	−16.0
Conservative	Bryan Watts	660	31.4	−16.3
UKIP	Hayden Turner	554	26.3	+26.3
Green	Patricia Bardwell	125	5.9	+5.9
Majority				
Turnout				
Labour hold		Swing		

=== West Flegg ===
West Flegg
Party	Candidate	Votes	%	±%
Conservative	Mary Coleman	1,441	52.6	−17.5
UKIP	Alexander Monk	628	22.9	+22.9
Labour	Stacey Nash	499	18.2	−11.7
Green	Joe Ridley	173	6.3	+6.3
Majority				
Turnout				
Conservative hold		Swing		
