= 2011 Great Yarmouth Borough Council election =

Map of the results of the 2011 Great Yarmouth council election. Conservatives in blue and Labour in red. Wards in grey were not contested in 2011.

The 2011 Great Yarmouth Borough Council election took place on 5 May 2011 to elect members of Great Yarmouth Borough Council in Norfolk, England. One third of the council was up for election and the Conservative Party stayed in overall control of the council. At the same time as the election, the introduction of a directly elected mayor in Great Yarmouth was rejected in a referendum.

After the election, the composition of the council was:

- Conservative 24
- Labour 15

== Background ==
Before the election the Conservatives ran the council with 24 seats, compared to 15 for Labour. 13 seats were being contested with Labour targeting Caister North and St Andrews, while the Conservatives were threatening Caister South and Nelson wards.

== Election result ==
The results saw the Conservatives remain in control of the council, with no change in their majority. The Conservatives gained one seat from Labour in Caister South, but lost a seat back in St Andrew's by 54 votes. The successful Labour candidate in St Andrew's ward was Barbara Wright, the wife of the former Member of Parliament for Great Yarmouth Tony Wright. Meanwhile, Kerry Payne held the seat in Nelson for Labour, despite being challenged by the incumbent councillor Brenda Taylor, who ran as an independent after being de-selected by Labour.

Great Yarmouth local election result 2011
Party	Seats	Gains	Losses	Net gain/loss	Seats %	Votes %	Votes	+/−
Conservative	8	1	1	0	61.5	51.4	10,523	+2.0%
Labour	5	1	1	0	38.5	42.3	8,662	-0.2%
UKIP	0	0	0	0	0	3.2	661	+3.2%
Independent	0	0	0	0	0	1.4	284	-0.5%
Liberal Democrats	0	0	0	0	0	1.1	231	-5.1%
Green	0	0	0	0	0	0.5	103	+0.5%

== Referendum on an elected mayor ==
At the same time as the council election Great Yarmouth held a referendum on whether to introduce a directly elected mayor. This came after the Labour councillors Michael Castle and Trevor Wainwright collected the necessary 3,500 signatures, 5% of the population of the area. However both the local Conservative and Labour parties opposed the introduction of a directly elected mayor, with the Conservative leader of the council, Barry Coleman, leading the campaign for a no vote.

The results of the referendum saw 15,595 vote no, as against 10,051 yes, with 291 ballot papers being spoilt, therefore the introduction of a directly elected mayor was rejected.

== Ward results ==
Bradwell North
Party	Candidate	Votes	%	±%
Conservative	James Tate	1,079	56.8	+1.0
Labour	Maurice Johnson	820	43.2	−1.0
Majority		259	13.6	+2.0
Turnout		1,899	38.2	−27.1
Conservative hold		Swing		

Bradwell South and Hopton
Party	Candidate	Votes	%	±%
Conservative	Susan Hacon	929	46.2	−12.7
Labour	Hilary Wainwright	722	35.9	−5.2
UKIP	Colin Aldred	256	12.7	+12.7
Green	Michael Brackenbury	103	5.1	+5.1
Majority		207	10.3	−7.5
Turnout		2,010	39.5	−25.9
Conservative hold		Swing		

Caister North
Party	Candidate	Votes	%	±%
Conservative	Barry Cunniffe	760	54.3	+3.3
Labour	Lee Sutton	525	37.5	+6.4
Liberal Democrats	Nicholas Dyer	114	8.1	−9.9
Majority		235	16.8	−3.1
Turnout		1,399	38.9	−26.5
Conservative hold		Swing		

Caister South
Party	Candidate	Votes	%	±%
Conservative	Robert Peck	788	55.0	+10.4
Labour	Nicholas Dack	644	45.0	+6.5
Majority		144	10.1	+4.0
Turnout		1,432	41.2	−26.9
Conservative gain from Labour		Swing		

Central and Northgate
Party	Candidate	Votes	%	±%
Labour	Marie Field	960	55.6	+11.2
Conservative	Tom Garrod	651	37.7	−0.8
Liberal Democrats	Gordon Dean	117	6.8	−10.3
Majority		309	17.9	+12.0
Turnout		1,728	30.6	−20.0
Labour hold		Swing		

Claydon
Party	Candidate	Votes	%	±%
Labour	Bernard Williamson	856	48.7	
Conservative	Hannah Gascoigne	496	28.2	
UKIP	Matthew Smith	405	23.1	
Majority		360	20.5	
Turnout		1,757	32.5	−22.3
Labour hold		Swing		

Fleggburgh
Party	Candidate	Votes	%	±%
Conservative	David Thompson	849	81.1	−7.2
Labour	Katie Jeavons-Golding	198	18.9	+7.2
Majority		651	62.2	−14.3
Turnout		1,047	56.7	
Conservative hold		Swing		

Lothingland
Party	Candidate	Votes	%	±%
Conservative	Mark Thompson	1,022	63.1	−1.1
Labour	Chris Williamson	597	36.9	+1.1
Majority		425	26.3	−2.2
Turnout		1,619	38.2	−26.4
Conservative hold		Swing		

Magdalen
Party	Candidate	Votes	%	±%
Labour	Brian Walker	1,128	60.5	+9.8
Conservative	Carl Smith	737	39.5	+2.2
Majority		391	21.0	+7.5
Turnout		1,865	36.0	−23.2
Labour hold		Swing		

Nelson
Party	Candidate	Votes	%	±%
Labour	Kerry Payne	690	48.9	+0.7
Conservative	Malcolm Bird	437	31.0	−6.7
Independent	Brenda Taylor	284	20.1	+6.0
Majority		253	17.9	+7.4
Turnout		1,411	26.2	−15.1
Labour hold		Swing		

Ormesby
Party	Candidate	Votes	%	±%
Conservative	James Shrimplin	1,070	72.1	−7.8
Labour	Colin Fox	415	27.9	+7.8
Majority		655	44.1	−15.7
Turnout		1,485	43.3	+7.1
Conservative hold		Swing		

St. Andrews
Party	Candidate	Votes	%	±%
Labour	Barbara Wright	621	52.3	+14.9
Conservative	Bryan Watts	567	47.7	−14.9
Majority		54	4.6	
Turnout		1,188	35.3	+6.8
Labour gain from Conservative		Swing		

West Flegg
Party	Candidate	Votes	%	±%
Conservative	Mary Coleman	1,138	70.1	−8.9
Labour	Luke Boydell	486	29.9	+8.9
Majority		652	40.1	−17.9
Turnout		1,624	41.4	+7.0
Conservative hold		Swing		
