= 2003 Great Yarmouth Borough Council election =

2003 UK local government election

The 2003 Great Yarmouth Borough Council election took place on 1 May 2003 to elect members of Great Yarmouth Borough Council in Norfolk, England. One third of the council was up for election and the Conservative Party stayed in overall control of the council.

After the election, the composition of the council was:

- Conservative 26
- Labour 22

== Election result ==
Overall turnout at the election was 30.32%.

Great Yarmouth local election result 2003
Party	Seats	Gains	Losses	Net gain/loss	Seats %	Votes %	Votes	+/−
Labour	10	2	0	+2	58.8	48.4	7,784	-2.8
Conservative	7	0	2	-2	41.2	44.6	7,162	+1.3
Liberal Democrats	0	0	0	0	0.0	4.7	751	+1.2
Green	0	0	0	0	0.0	2.4	378	+0.4

== Ward results ==
Caister North
Party	Candidate	Votes	%	±%
Conservative	Barry Cunniffe	644	45.5	+2.0
Labour	Sandy Griffiths	592	41.8	−1.5
Liberal Democrats	Nicholas Dyer	147	10.4	−1.1
Green	Roy Walmsley	32	2.3	+0.6
Majority		52	3.7	+3.5
Turnout		1,415		

Caister South
Party	Candidate	Votes	%	±%
Labour	Patrick Hacon	557	51.1	+4.0
Conservative	Thomas Andrews	473	43.4	−5.5
Green	Robert Chandler	61	5.6	+1.6
Majority		84	7.7	
Turnout		1,091		

Claydon (2)
Party	Candidate	Votes	%	±%
Labour	Anthony Blyth	608		
Labour	Bernard Williamson	479		
Conservative	Peter Meah	360		
Turnout		1,447		

Fleggburgh
Party	Candidate	Votes	%	±%
Conservative	David Thompson	723	80.9	
Labour	Roger Timms	171	19.1	
Majority		552	61.8	
Turnout		894		

Gorleston
Party	Candidate	Votes	%	±%
Conservative	Colin Hodds	737	56.4	−1.3
Labour	Sharon Thrasher	376	28.8	−1.0
Liberal Democrats	Ivan Lees	194	14.8	+2.4
Majority		361	27.6	−0.3
Turnout		1,307		

Lichfield and Cobholm
Party	Candidate	Votes	%	±%
Labour	Penelope Linden	447	73.0	−5.6
Conservative	Jason Delf	165	27.0	+5.6
Majority		282	46.1	−11.1
Turnout		612		

Lothingland
Party	Candidate	Votes	%	±%
Conservative	James Tate	572	50.9	−6.6
Labour	Richard Barker	551	49.1	+6.6
Majority		21	1.9	−13.1
Turnout		1,123		

Magdalen East
Party	Candidate	Votes	%	±%
Labour	Raymond Peek	429	48.8	−13.3
Conservative	David Denning	407	46.3	+8.4
Green	Diane Nottage	43	4.9	+4.9
Majority		22	2.5	−21.8
Turnout		879		

Magdalen West
Party	Candidate	Votes	%	±%
Labour	Colleen Walker	661	71.8	−8.9
Conservative	John Hayes	171	18.6	−0.7
Green	Martyn McCarthy	88	9.6	+9.6
Majority		490	53.3	−8.0
Turnout		920		

Nelson
Party	Candidate	Votes	%	±%
Labour	Michael Jeal	424	65.1	−8.7
Conservative	Joy Cosaitis	163	25.0	+4.0
Liberal Democrats	Michael Tall	64	9.8	+9.8
Majority		261	40.1	−12.7
Turnout		651		

Northgate
Party	Candidate	Votes	%	±%
Labour	Michael Taylor	662	57.3	−0.3
Conservative	Alan Baugh	368	31.8	−1.2
Liberal Democrats	Anthony Harris	126	10.9	+4.1
Majority		294	25.4	+0.8
Turnout		1,156		

Ormesby
Party	Candidate	Votes	%	±%
Conservative	James Shrimplin	720	63.5	−6.1
Labour	Nicholas Dack	273	24.1	+7.3
Liberal Democrats	Pamela Mayhew	141	12.4	+1.5
Majority		447	39.4	−13.4
Turnout		1,134		

Regent
Party	Candidate	Votes	%	±%
Conservative	Gerald Jarvis	446	49.4	+0.2
Labour	Valerie Pettit	374	41.5	−3.7
Green	Paula Thompson	82	9.1	+3.6
Majority		72	8.0	+4.0
Turnout		902		

Rollesby
Party	Candidate	Votes	%	±%
Conservative	Barry Coleman	310	61.3	
Labour	Peter Alexander	117	23.1	
Liberal Democrats	Rodney Cole	79	15.6	
Majority		193	38.2	
Turnout		506		

St Andrews
Party	Candidate	Votes	%	±%
Labour	Maria Culmer	484	52.5	−4.9
Conservative	Patrick Cook	438	47.5	+4.9
Majority		46	5.0	−9.8
Turnout		922		

Yarmouth North
Party	Candidate	Votes	%	±%
Labour	Ralph Woodcock	579	51.9	−1.2
Conservative	John Getliff	465	41.7	−1.7
Green	Sheila Chandler	72	6.5	+3.0
Majority		114	10.2	+0.5
Turnout		1,116		
