= Somerton, Norfolk =

Civil parish in Norfolk, England

Coordinates: 52°43′05″N 1°39′44″E

Somerton
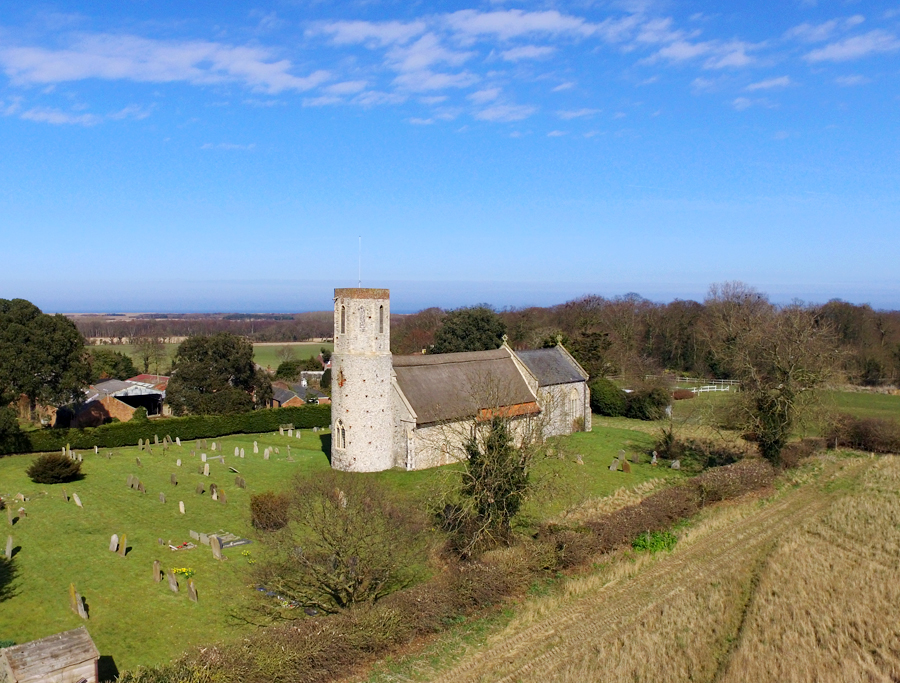
- West Somerton St Mary

- Location within Norfolk
- Area: 8.25 km^{2} (3.19 sq mi)
- Population: 289 (2011)
  - Density: 35/km^{2} (91/sq mi)
- OS grid reference: TG 480 197
- Civil parish: Somerton
- District: Great Yarmouth
- Shire county: Norfolk
- Region: East
- Country: England
- Sovereign state: United Kingdom
- Post town: GREAT YARMOUTH
- Postcode district: NR29
- Police: Norfolk
- Fire: Norfolk
- Ambulance: East of England

Somerton is a civil parish in the English county of Norfolk. It comprises the twin villages of East Somerton and West Somerton and is situated some 14 km (8.7 mi) north of the town of Great Yarmouth, 35 km (22 mi) north-east of the city of Norwich, and 2 km (1.2 mi) from the sea.

The civil parish has an area of 8.25 km^{2} (3.19 sq mi), and in the 2001 census had a population of 257 in 93 households, the population increasing to 289 at the 2011 census. For the purposes of local government the parish falls within the district of Great Yarmouth.

The church of West Somerton St Mary is one of 124 existing round-tower churches in Norfolk. West Marsh Mill is a drainage mill converted to residential accommodation.

== Notable residents ==
In the churchyard is the grave of Robert Hales, the Norfolk Giant. He was born in the village in 1820 as one of nine children. Eventually reaching 7 feet 8 inches (2.34 m) and over 32 stone (450 lb; 200 kg), he worked in the circus world, met Queen Victoria, and retired to a pub in London. As his health worsened he returned to Norfolk, where he died in 1863.
