= Repps with Bastwick =

Civil parish in Norfolk, England

Coordinates: 52.696°N 1.581°E

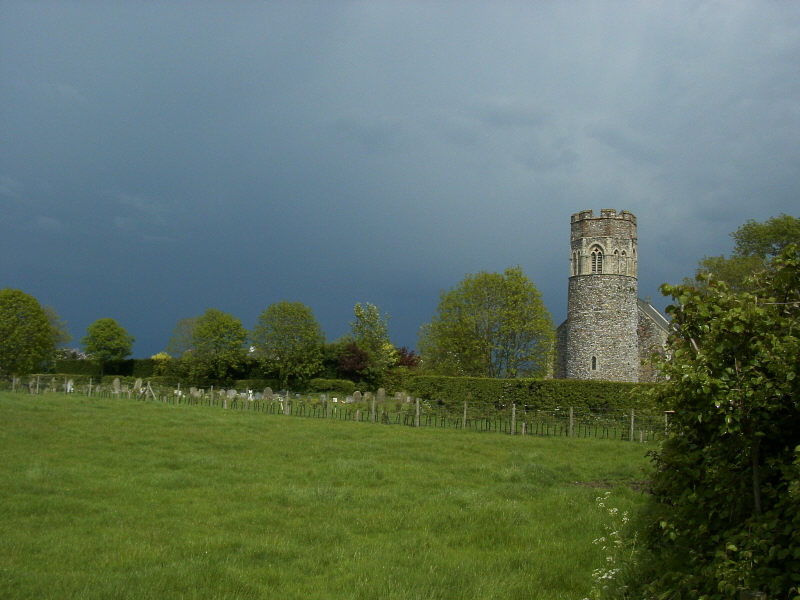
- Repps-with-Bastwick St Peter

- Location within Norfolk
- Area: 5.10 km^{2} (1.97 sq mi)
- Population: 391 (2011)
  - Density: 77/km^{2} (200/sq mi)
- OS grid reference: TG 415 171
- Civil parish: Repps with Bastwick
- District: Great Yarmouth
- Shire county: Norfolk
- Region: East
- Country: England
- Sovereign state: United Kingdom
- Post town: GREAT YARMOUTH
- Postcode district: NR29
- Police: Norfolk
- Fire: Norfolk
- Ambulance: East of England

Repps with Bastwick is a civil parish in the English county of Norfolk. It comprises the adjacent villages of Bastwick and Repps, which are situated some 16 km (9.9 mi) north-west of the town of Great Yarmouth and 22 km (14 mi) north-east of the city of Norwich. The parish borders the River Thurne and Bastwick is at the south end of the bridge which carries the A149 road over that river to the village of Potter Heigham.

The civil parish has an area of 5.1 km^{2} (2.0 sq mi) and in the 2001 census had a population of 401 in 172 households, the population reducing to 391 in the 2011 Census. For the purposes of local government, the parish falls within the district of Great Yarmouth.

A windmill in Repps has been converted to holiday accommodation. The church of Repps-with-Bastwick St Peter is one of 124 existing round-tower churches in Norfolk.
