= Rollesby =

Village in Norfolk, England

Coordinates: 52.68619°N 1.62505°E

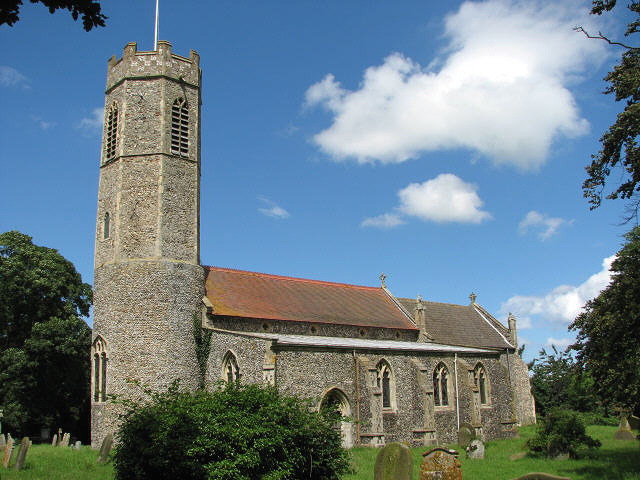
- Rollesby St George

- Location within Norfolk
- Area: 5.91 km^{2} (2.28 sq mi)
- Population: 946 (2011 census)
  - Density: 160/km^{2} (410/sq mi)
- OS grid reference: TG451160
- Civil parish: Rollesby
- District: Great Yarmouth
- Shire county: Norfolk
- Region: East
- Country: England
- Sovereign state: United Kingdom
- Post town: GREAT YARMOUTH
- Postcode district: NR29
- Dialling code: 01493
- Police: Norfolk
- Fire: Norfolk
- Ambulance: East of England
- UK Parliament: Great Yarmouth

Rollesby is a village and civil parish in the English county of Norfolk. It is situated on the A149 road, adjacent to Rollesby Broad and Ormesby Broad, about 12 km (7.5 mi) north-west of the town of Great Yarmouth and 30 km (19 mi) east of the city of Norwich.

The villages name means 'Hrolfr's farm/settlement'.

The civil parish has an area of 5.91 km^{2} (2.28 sq mi) and in the 2001 census had a population of 995 in 408 households, the population reducing at the 2011 Census to 946. For the purposes of local government, the parish falls within the district of Great Yarmouth.

The church of Rollesby St George is one of 124 existing round-tower churches in Norfolk and is a Grade II* listed building.
