= Cobholm Island =

Island in Norfolk, England

Cobholm Island is situated in the East Anglian county of Norfolk, England, close to Great Yarmouth. The population of the Island is included in the Southtown and Cobholm Ward of Great Yarmouth Borough Council.

Originally the island was bounded by the River Yare to the east, Breydon Water to the north, and the Lady Haven to the south and west. The latter has dried up following building, so Cobholm Island now directly connects to Southtown to the west of Great Yarmouth.

The island was severely affected by the North Sea flood of 1953 which resulted in the deaths of 307 people, with 10 people killed and 3,500 homes destroyed in the Cobholm and Southtown areas.
