= Trinity Broads =

Site of Special Scientific Interest in Norfolk, England

Coordinates: 52.676°N 1.643°E

- Site of Special Scientific Interest
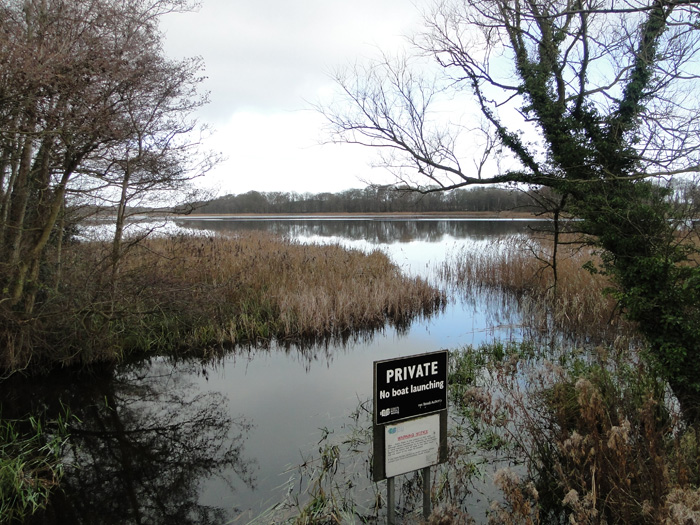
- Filby Broad looking north from the bridge
- Location of Trinity Broads.
- Area of search: Norfolk
- Grid reference: TG 464 149
- Interest: Biological
- Area: 316.8 hectares (783 acres)
- Notification date: 1998
- Location map: Magic Map

Trinity Broads is a 316.8-hectare (783-acre) biological Site of Special Scientific Interest north of Great Yarmouth in Norfolk, England. They are in The Broads Special Area of Conservation. They are also part of the Broads National Park in Norfolk, England, comprising five broads in total. The three largest are Rollesby Broad, Ormesby Broad and Filby Broad, and there are two much smaller broads named Lily Broad and Ormesby Little Broad. They are managed by the Broads Authority.

The Trinity Broads are on a tributary of the River Bure, but there is no navigable link to the main river system, and they are therefore virtually undisturbed.

== Water supply ==
In 1995, most of the broads were bought by Essex and Suffolk Water, as a means of supplying water to Great Yarmouth. The quality of the water is good, and has been further protected by the construction of a sluice where Muck Fleet meets the River Bure. In order to meet their statutory requirements for conservation and recreation, ESW have formed a partnership with the Broads Authority, the Environment Agency and English Nature. A joint management plan has ensured that recreational use is maintained at a low level and the value of the broads as a wildlife habitat is retained. The level of water in Muck Fleet is lower than that of the River Bure, and water from the channel is pumped into the river by Stokesby pumping station, which is maintained by the internal drainage board.

A project to rectify poor water quality in Ormesby Broad began in 2010. Costing £120,000 over three years, the project involves pumping mud from the bottom of the lake. The mud is rich in nutrients, as a result of agricultural runoff, and removing it increases the capacity of the lake to store water, which is extracted as drinking water, as well as providing better habitat for reedbeds at the edges of the lake. Twelve lagoons were prepared to hold the mud until it dried, but initial archaeological investigation of the site for the lagoons revealed the presence of a Middle Bronze Age field system, the first such system found to the east of the Cambridgeshire Fens. The start of pumping was delayed while the site was investigated. Pumping began in March 2010, but was delayed again when live ammunition was sucked up in the mud, and became trapped in the pumps.

By mid-May, pumping had to stop, due to the rapid growth of aquatic plants. It resumed in August, and by early 2011, around 20,000 cubic yards (15,000 m^{3}) had been removed. Once the mud had dried, the nutrients in it make it good for fertilising poor-quality soil, and it was ploughed in. When completed, around twice this volume of mud had been removed from the bottom of the broad.

== Recreation ==
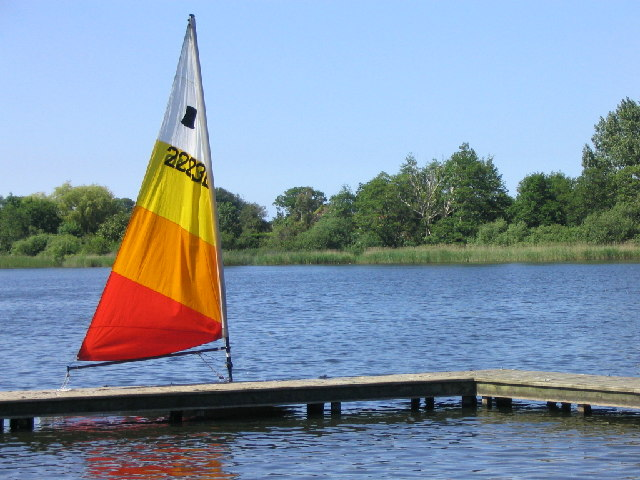
Sailing dinghy on Rollesby Broad

No motor boats are allowed onto the Trinity Broads, although rowing boats and dinghies are available for hire. Muck Fleet, which connects the broads to the River Bure, is too shallow even for such craft.

Besides sailing, the broads are also very popular with anglers. Recently, new facilities for disabled people have been created, including a special platform for anglers in wheelchairs. Ormesby Little Broad is used for sailing model yachts, and the Norfolk Model Yacht Club have an arrangement with Essex and Suffolk Water, which allows them to use the broad for this purpose once a month. Like their larger counterparts, the use of petrol or oil engines is not permitted, and all remote control is therefore by electric motors.

== Water quality ==
The Environment Agency measure the water quality of the river systems in England. Each is given an overall ecological status, which may be one of five levels: high, good, moderate, poor and bad. There are several components that are used to determine this, including biological status, which looks at the quantity and varieties of invertebrates, angiosperms and fish. Chemical status, which compares the concentrations of various chemicals against known safe concentrations, is rated good or fail. Muck Fleet is designated as "heavily modified", which means that the channels have been altered by human activity, and the criteria for this designation are defined by the Water Framework Directive.

The water quality for Muck Fleet, which includes most of the broads, was as follows in 2019.

Section	Ecological Status	Chemical Status	Length	Catchment	Channel
Muck Fleetf	Moderate	Fail	7.0 miles (11.3 km)	18.81 square miles (48.7 km^{2})	heavily modified

Reasons for the water quality being less than good include groundwater and surface water abstraction, physical modification of the channel, and runoff from agricultural and rural land. Like most rivers in the UK, the chemical status changed from good to fail in 2019, due to the presence of polybrominated diphenyl ethers (PBDE) which had not previously been included in the assessment.

== Bibliography ==
- Cumberlidge, Jane (2009). Inland Waterways of Great Britain (8th Ed). Imray Laurie Norie and Wilson. ISBN 978-1-84623-010-3.
- Johnson, Cath; Gray, Hannah (2006). "Trinity Broads management plan" (PDF). Archived from the original (PDF) on 18 July 2011.
