= West Caister =

Village in Norfolk, England

Coordinates: 52.64420°N 1.70291°E

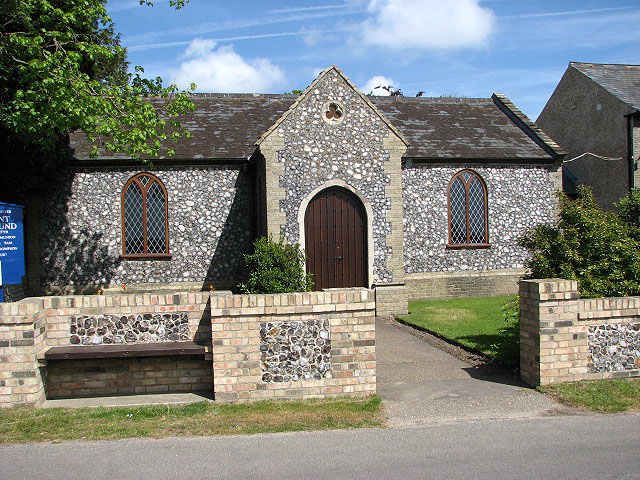
- St Edmund's church, West Caister

- Location within Norfolk
- Area: 6.85 km^{2} (2.64 sq mi)
- Population: 175 (2011)
  - Density: 26/km^{2} (67/sq mi)
- OS grid reference: TG506116
- Civil parish: West Caister
- District: Great Yarmouth
- Shire county: Norfolk
- Region: East
- Country: England
- Sovereign state: United Kingdom
- Post town: GREAT YARMOUTH
- Postcode district: NR30
- Dialling code: 01493
- Police: Norfolk
- Fire: Norfolk
- Ambulance: East of England
- UK Parliament: Great Yarmouth

West Caister is a village and civil parish in the English county of Norfolk. It is situated just inland from the coast, some 2 km (1.2 mi) from the seaside resort of Caister-on-Sea and 4 km (2.5 mi) north of the town of Great Yarmouth.

The civil parish has an area of 6.85 km^{2} (2.64 sq mi) and in the 2001 census had a population of 195 in 83 households, reducing to a population of 175 in 72 households at the 2011 Census. For the purposes of local government, the parish falls within the district of Great Yarmouth.

West Caister is the site of Caister Castle, a 15th-century moated castle built by Sir John Fastolf, who was the inspiration for William Shakespeare's Falstaff.
