= Borough of Great Yarmouth =

- Non-metropolitan district and borough
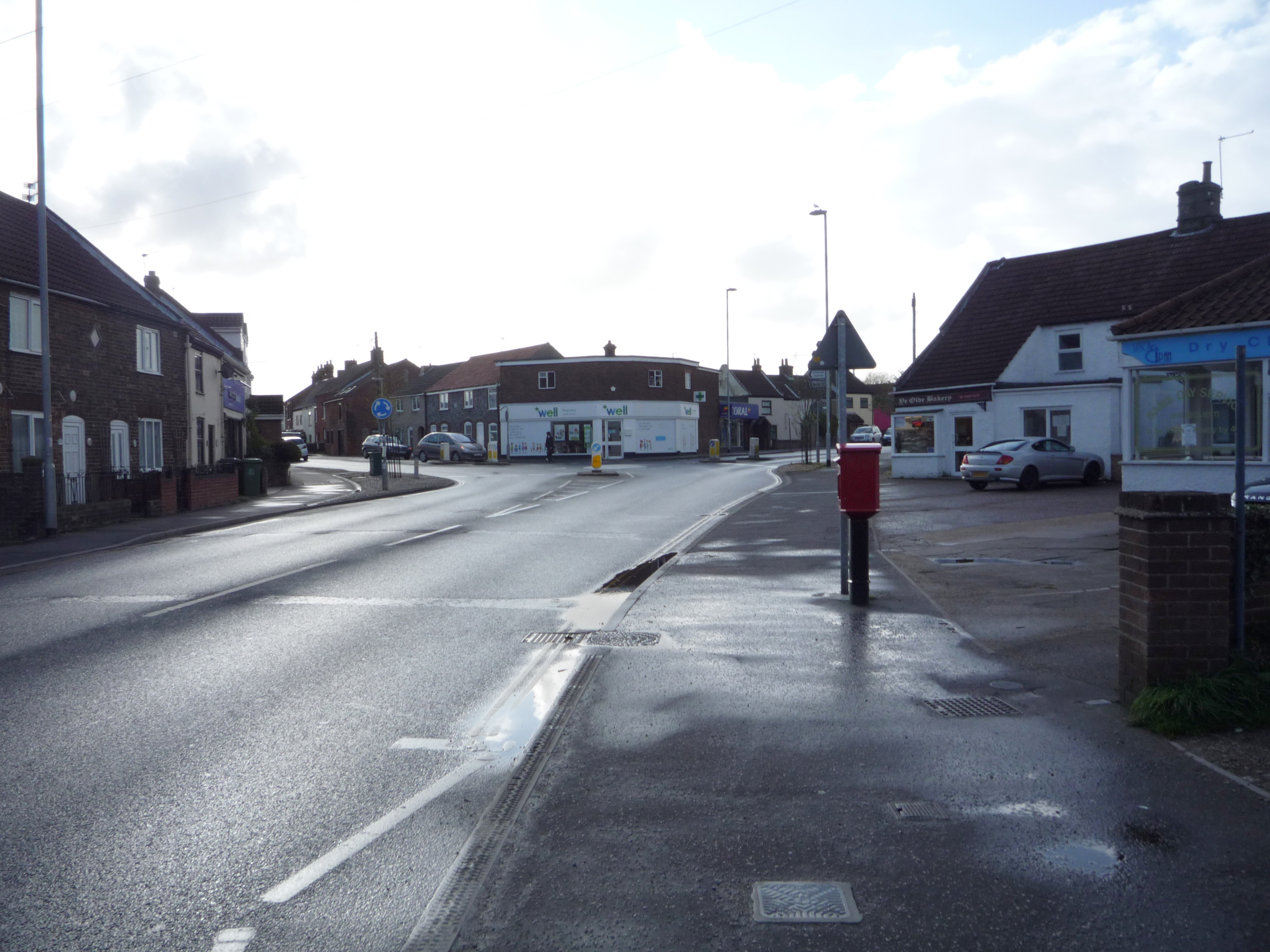
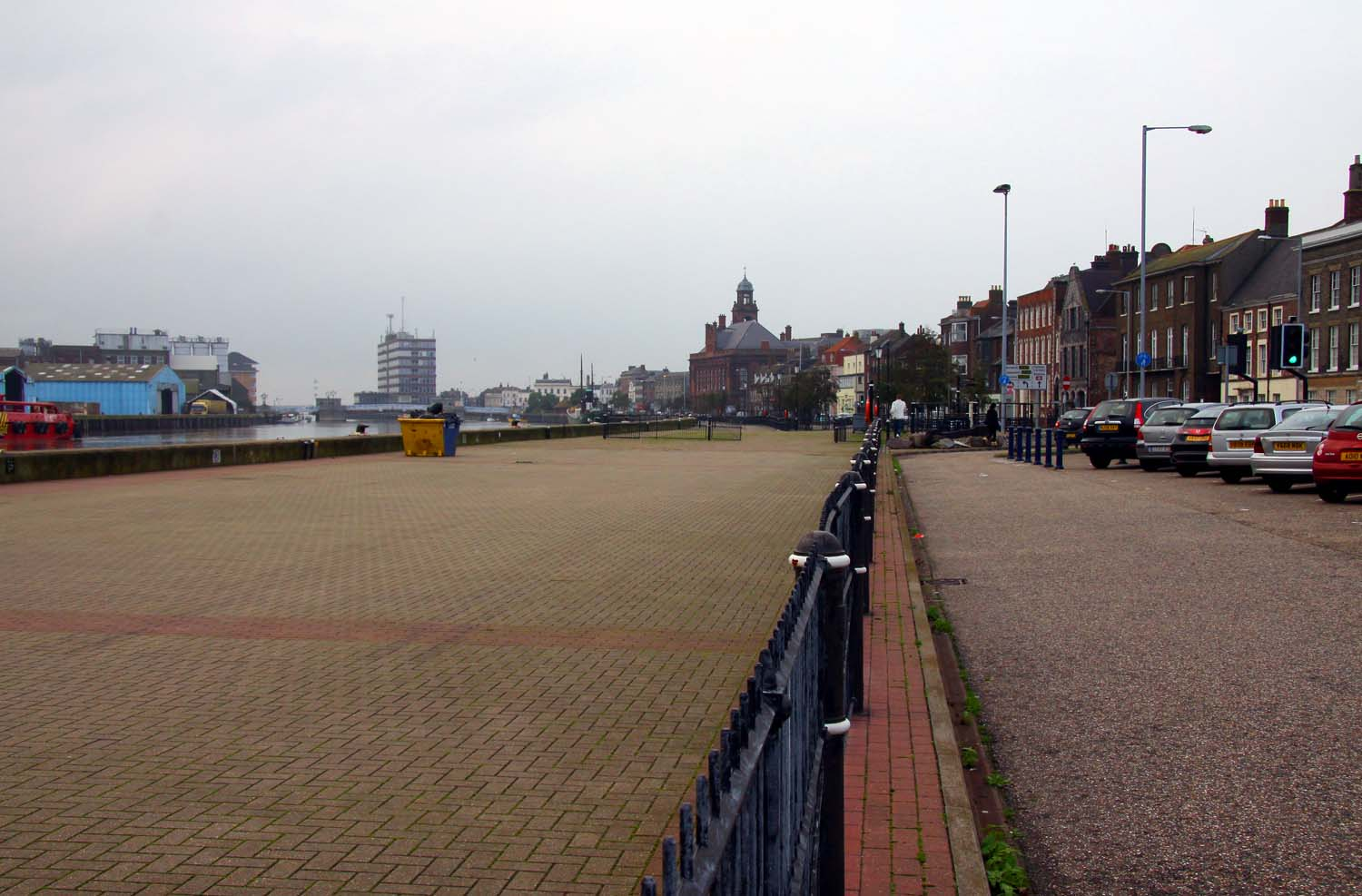
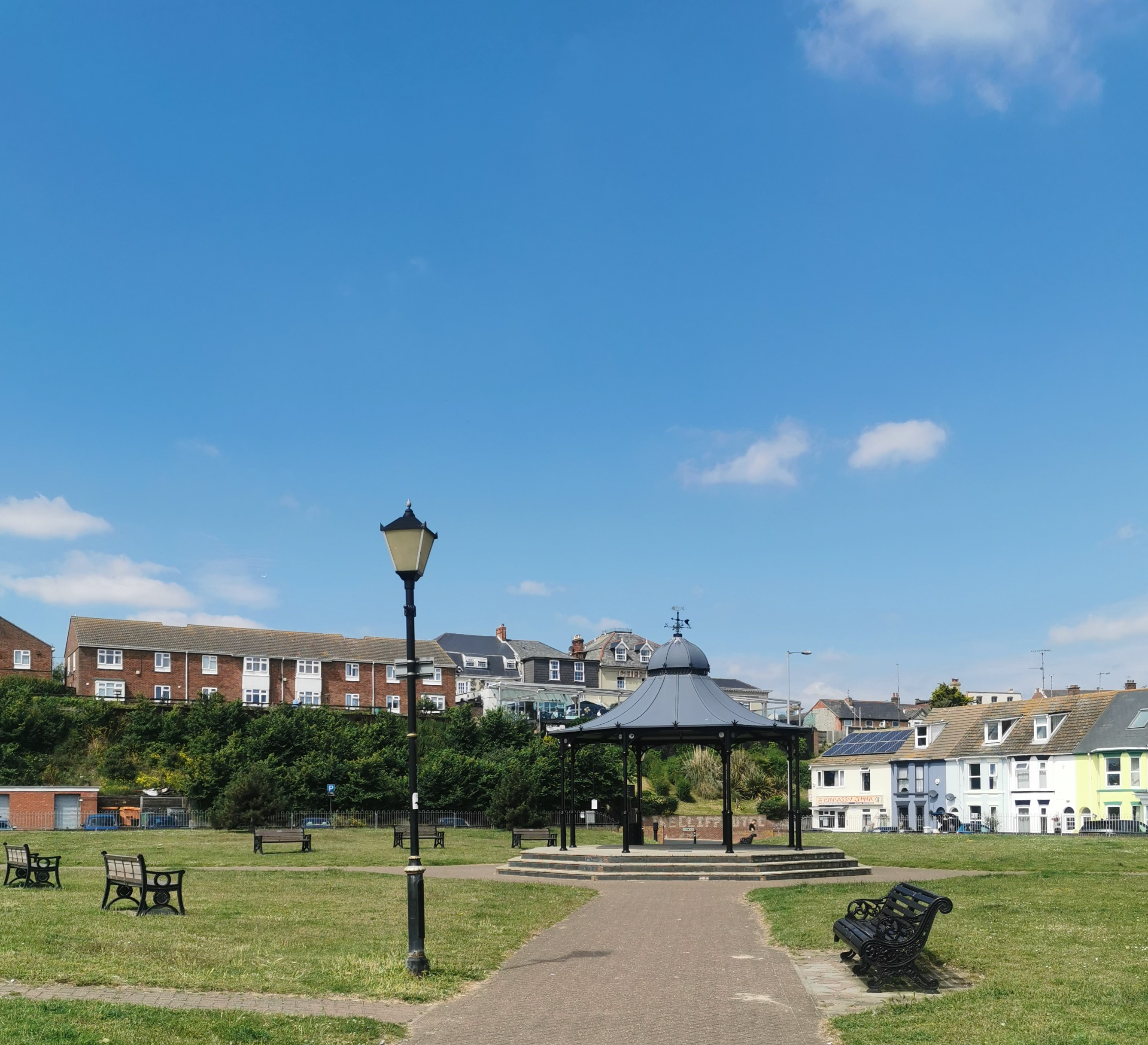
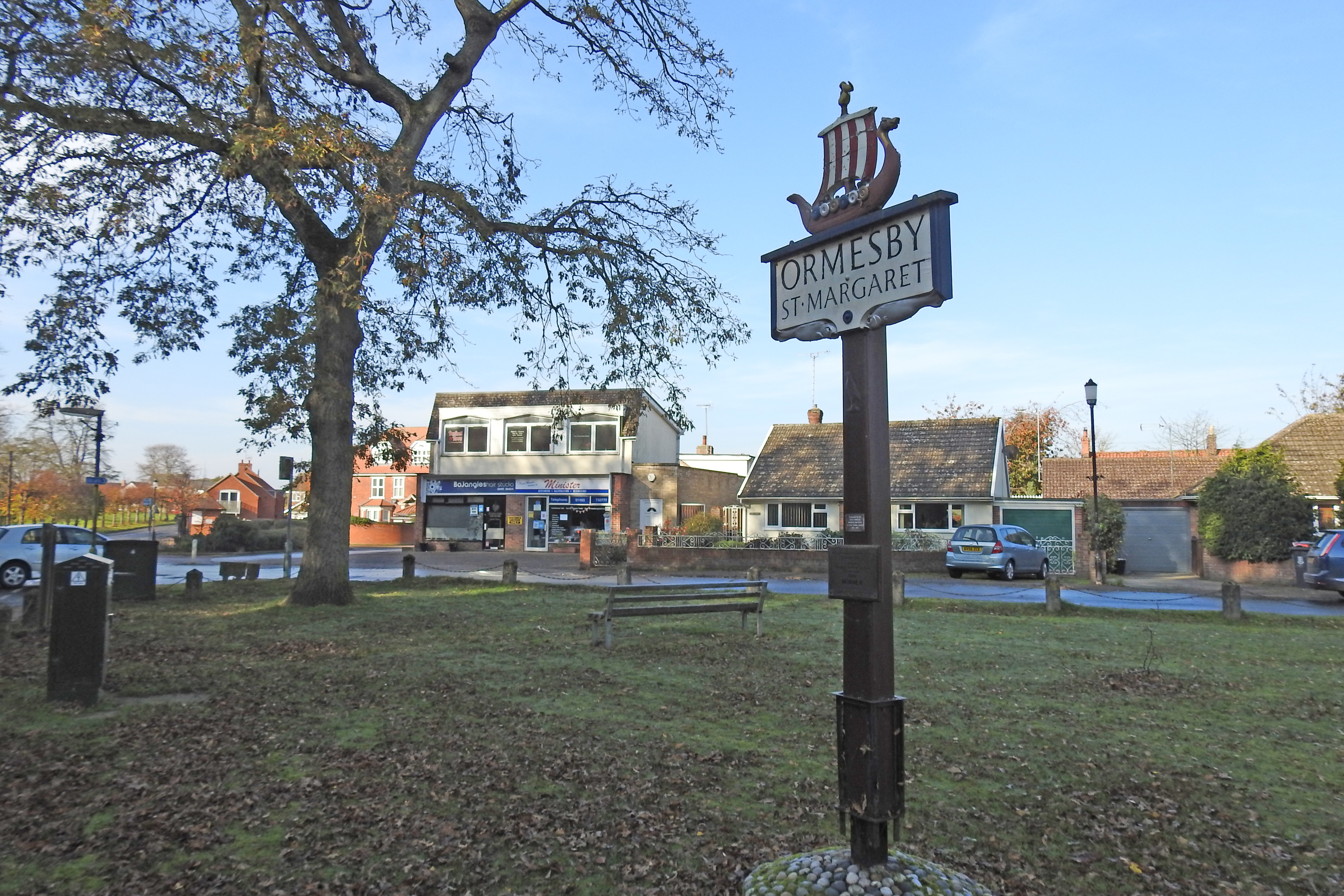
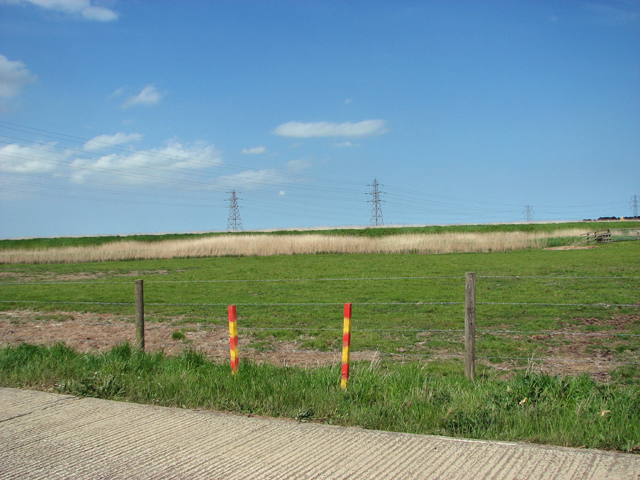
- From left to right; Top: Caister-on-Sea High Street; Middle: South Quay in Great Yarmouth and the bandstand in Gorleston-on-Sea; Bottom: Ormesby St Margaret village centre and pastures near St Olaves

- Great Yarmouth shown within Norfolk
- Coordinates: 52°36′28″N 1°43′59″E
- Sovereign state: United Kingdom
- Constituent country: England
- Region: East of England
- Non-metropolitan county: Norfolk
- Status: Non-metropolitan district
- Admin HQ: Great Yarmouth
- Incorporated: 1 April 1974

Government
  - Type: Non-metropolitan district council
  - Body: Great Yarmouth Borough Council
  - MPs: Rupert Lowe

Area
  - Total: 67.2 sq mi (174.0 km^{2})
  - Rank: 154th (of 296)

Population (2025)
  - Total: 100,957
  - Rank: 248th (of 296)
  - Density: 1,503/sq mi (580.2/km^{2})

Ethnicity (2021)
  - Ethnic groups: List: 94.6% White; 1.9% Asian; 1.6% Mixed; 1.1% Black; 0.8% other

Religion (2021)
  - Religion: List: 46.7% Christianity; 45.2% no religion; 7.4% other; 0.7% Islam
- Time zone: UTC0 (GMT)
  - Summer (DST): UTC+1 (BST)
- OS grid reference: TG5271507684

The Borough of Great Yarmouth is a local government district with borough status in Norfolk, England. It is named after its main town, Great Yarmouth, and also contains the town of Gorleston-on-Sea and a number of villages and rural areas, including part of The Broads. Other notable settlements include Bastwick, Belton, Bradwell, Burgh Castle, Caister-on-Sea, California, Fleggburgh, Hemsby, Martham, Hopton-on-Sea, Ormesby St Margaret, Rollesby, St Olaves, Scratby, Stokesby and Winterton-on-Sea.

The borough is on the east coast of Norfolk, facing the North Sea. It borders North Norfolk to the north, Broadland to the west, South Norfolk to the south-west, and East Suffolk to the south.

== History ==
The town of Great Yarmouth was an ancient borough, having been granted a charter in 1208. The borough was enlarged in 1668 to take in the Southtown area (also known as Little Yarmouth) on the south side of the River Yare in the parish of Gorleston. In 1703 the borough was given the right to appoint a mayor. The borough was reformed to become a municipal borough in 1836, when it was also enlarged to include the rest of the parish of Gorleston. When elected county councils were created in 1889, Great Yarmouth was considered large enough to provide its own county-level services and so it became a county borough, independent from the new Norfolk County Council.

The modern district was formed on 1 April 1974 under the Local Government Act 1972, covering the whole area of the former county borough and parts of another two districts, which were all abolished at the same time:

- Blofield and Flegg Rural District (parishes lying generally north-east of the River Bure, rest went to Broadland (Note: Except a small detached part of the district containing the Shirehall, which went to Norwich.))
- Great Yarmouth County Borough
- Lothingland Rural District (parishes of Belton, Bradwell, Burgh Castle, Fritton and St Olaves and Hopton-on-Sea only, rest went to Waveney)

The Lothingland parishes had been in East Suffolk prior to the 1974 reforms; their inclusion in the Great Yarmouth district was brought about as an amendment to the draft legislation at committee stage proposed by Anthony Fell, Member of Parliament for the Great Yarmouth constituency.

The new district was named Great Yarmouth after its main settlement and was granted borough status from its creation, allowing the chair of the council to take the title of mayor, continuing Great Yarmouth's series of mayors dating back to 1703.

In March 2026, the government announced plans to abolish the district in 2028 as part of local government reorganisation across Norfolk. These proposals were withdrawn in September 2026.

== Governance ==
Great Yarmouth Borough Council

Type
- Type: Non-metropolitan district

Leadership
- Mayor: Jade Martin, Labour since 21 May 2026
- Leader: Carl Smith, Conservative since 16 May 2019
- Chief Executive: Sheila Oxtoby since November 2015

Structure
- Seats: 39 councillors
- Political groups: Administration (17) Conservative (17) Other parties (21) Labour (17) Great Yarmouth First (1) Independent (3) Vacant (1) Vacant (1)

Elections
- Last election: 4 May 2023

Meeting place
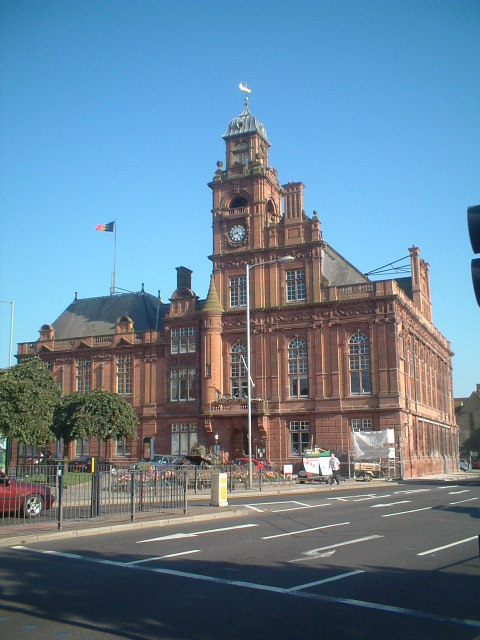
- Town Hall, Hall Plain, Great Yarmouth, NR30 2QF

Website
- www.great-yarmouth.gov.uk

Great Yarmouth Borough Council provides district-level services. County-level services are provided by Norfolk County Council. Parts of the borough are also covered by civil parishes, which form a third tier of local government.

In the parts of the district within The Broads, town planning is the responsibility of the Broads Authority. The borough council appoints one of its councillors to sit on that authority.

=== Political control ===
The council has been under no overall control since the 2023 election, being run by a Conservative minority administration.

The first election to the borough council as reformed under the Local Government Act 1972 was held in 1973, initially operating as a shadow authority alongside the outgoing authorities until the new arrangements came into effect on 1 April 1974. Political control of the council since 1974 has been as follows:

Party in control	Years
Conservative	1974–1980
No overall control	1980–1983
Conservative	1983–1986
No overall control	1986–1990
Labour	1990–2000
Conservative	2000–2012
Labour	2012–2014
No overall control	2014–2017
Conservative	2017–2023
No overall control	2023–present

=== Leadership ===
The role of mayor is largely ceremonial in Great Yarmouth. Political leadership is instead provided by the leader of the council. The leaders since 1999 have been:

Councillor	Party	From	To
Barry Coleman	Conservative	1999	2011
Steve Ames	Conservative	May 2011	May 2012
Trevor Wainwright	Labour	May 2012	19 May 2015
Graham Plant	Conservative	19 May 2015	May 2019
Carl Smith	Conservative	16 May 2019	

=== Composition ===
Following the 2023 election the composition of the council was:

Party	Councillors
Labour	17
Conservative	17
Great Yarmouth First	1
Independent	3
Total	39

The next election is due in 2027 with the new unitary councils.

=== Elections ===
Since the last boundary changes in 2004 the council has comprised 39 councillors representing 17 wards, with each ward electing one, two or three councillors. Elections are held every four years.

In the 2016 United Kingdom European Union membership referendum, 71.5% of Great Yarmouth voted to leave the European Union, the 5th highest such leave vote in the country.

UK Youth Parliament

Although the UK Youth Parliament is an apolitical organisation, the elections are run in a way similar to that of the Local Elections. The votes come from 11 to 18-year olds and are combined to make the decision of the next, 2-year Member of Youth Parliament. The elections are run at different times across the country with Great Yarmouth's typically being in early Spring and bi-annually.

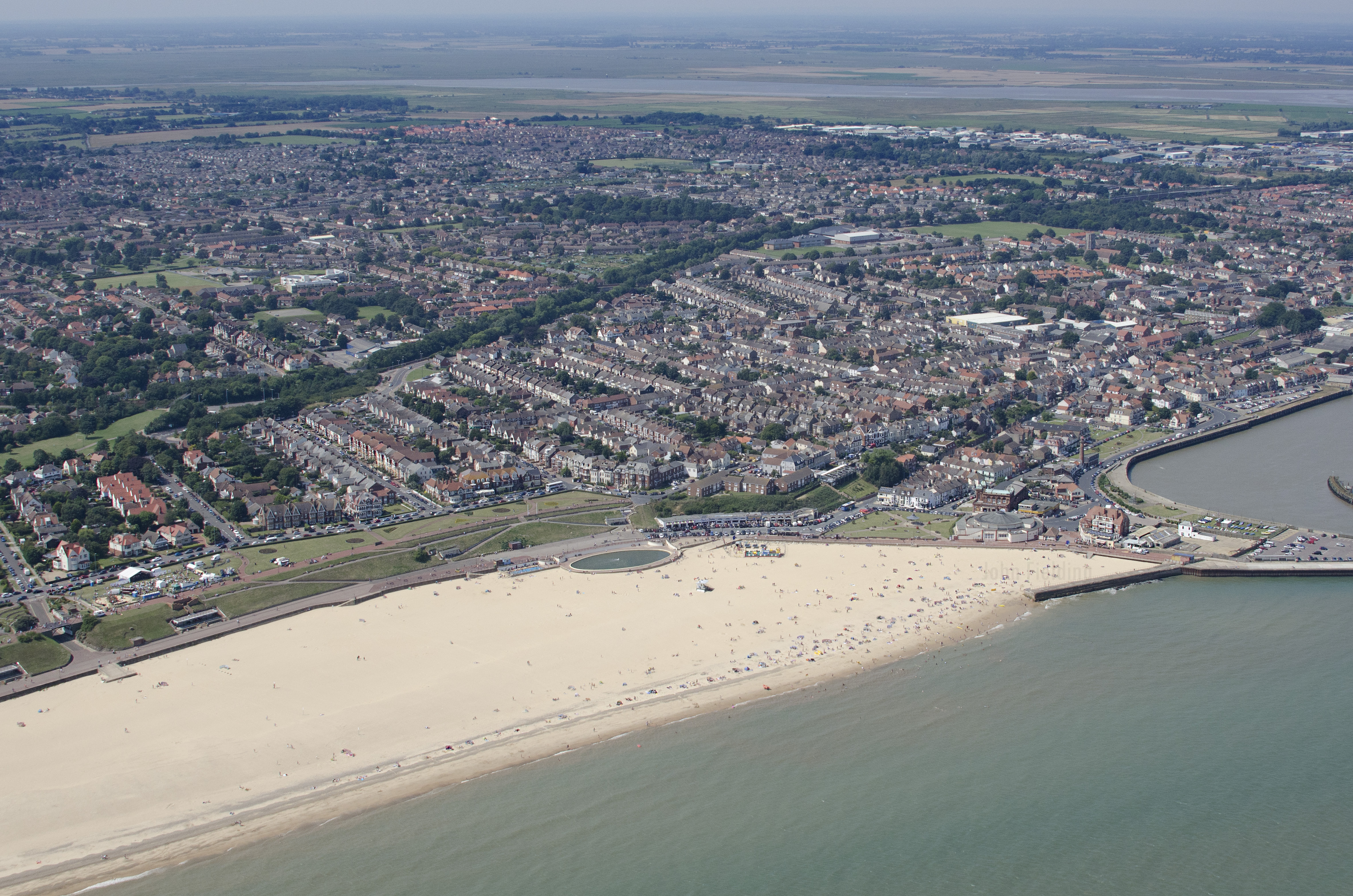
Gorleston-on-Sea, the second largest settlement in the borough

=== Premises ===
The council is based at Great Yarmouth Town Hall on Hall Plain, which was completed in 1882 for the old borough council.

== Geography ==
The borough comprises the urban area of Great Yarmouth itself, together with 21 surrounding parishes. At the time of the 2001 census, the borough had an area of 182 km², of which 26 km² was in the urban area and 156 km² in the surrounding parishes. The borough had a population of 90,810 in 39,380 households, with 47,288 people in 21,007 households living in the urban area, whilst 43,522 people in 18,373 households lived in the surrounding parishes.

=== Places ===
Besides Great Yarmouth itself, other significant settlements in the borough include:

- Bastwick, Belton, Bradwell, Browston Green, Burgh Castle, Burgh St Margaret
- Caister-on-Sea, California
- East Somerton
- Filby, Fleggburgh, Fritton
- Gorleston-on-Sea
- Hemsby, Hopton-on-Sea
- Martham, Mautby
- Runham
- Ormesby St. Margaret, Ormesby St. Michael
- Repps, Rollesby
- St. Olaves, Scratby, Stokesby
- Thrigby
- West Somerton, Winterton-on-Sea
- Cobholm Island

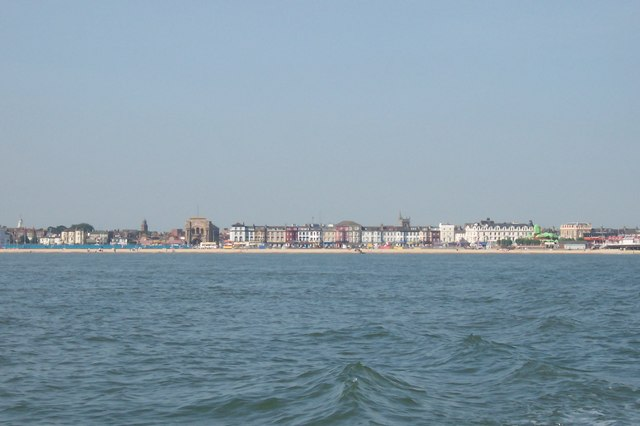
Great Yarmouth seafront from Scroby Sands.

=== Parishes ===
The main part of Great Yarmouth itself, roughly corresponding to the pre-1974 borough (and so including Gorleston) is an unparished area. The remainder of the district comprises the following civil parishes:

- Ashby with Oby
- Belton with Browston †, Bradwell †, Burgh Castle †
- Caister-on-Sea
- Filby, Fleggburgh with Billockby & Clippesby, Fritton and St. Olaves †
- Hemsby, Hopton-on-Sea †
- Martham, Mautby
- Ormesby St. Margaret with Scratby, Ormesby St. Michael
- Repps with Bastwick, Rollesby
- Somerton, Stokesby with Herringby
- Thurne
- West Caister, Winterton-on-Sea

† formerly part of Lothingland Rural District

== Freedom of the Borough ==
The following people, military units and organisations and groups have received the Freedom of the Borough of Great Yarmouth.

=== Individuals ===
- Admiral Horatio Nelson, 1st Viscount Nelson: 6 November 1800.
- Cora Batley: 1997.
- Michael Thomas Jeal: 14 April 2022.
- Sir Richard Jewson KCVO JP: 2019.
- Hugh Sturzaker: 6 November 2025.
- Jayne Biggs: 6 November 2025.
- Jade Martin: 6 November 2025.
- Capt. Sir William Hoste, 1st Baronet, KCB: 1828.
- Henry Manship: 1545.

=== Military Units ===
- The 1st East Anglian Regiment: 1963.
- The Royal Anglian Regiment: 1964.
- HMS Yarmouth, RN: 1984.
- The Great Yarmouth and Gorleston Lifeboat Station, RNLI: 1984.
- The Caister Volunteer Lifeboat Service: 1984.
- 901 Troop Royal Marines Cadets: 28 September 2012.
- The Royal British Legion (Great Yarmouth Branch): 2 November 2012.
- HMS Dauntless, RN: 11 June 2013.

=== Organisations and Groups ===
- Great Yarmouth Lions Club: 18 April 2024.

== See also ==
- Great Yarmouth Outer Harbour
