= North Elmham railway station =

Railway station in Norfolk, England

North Elmham
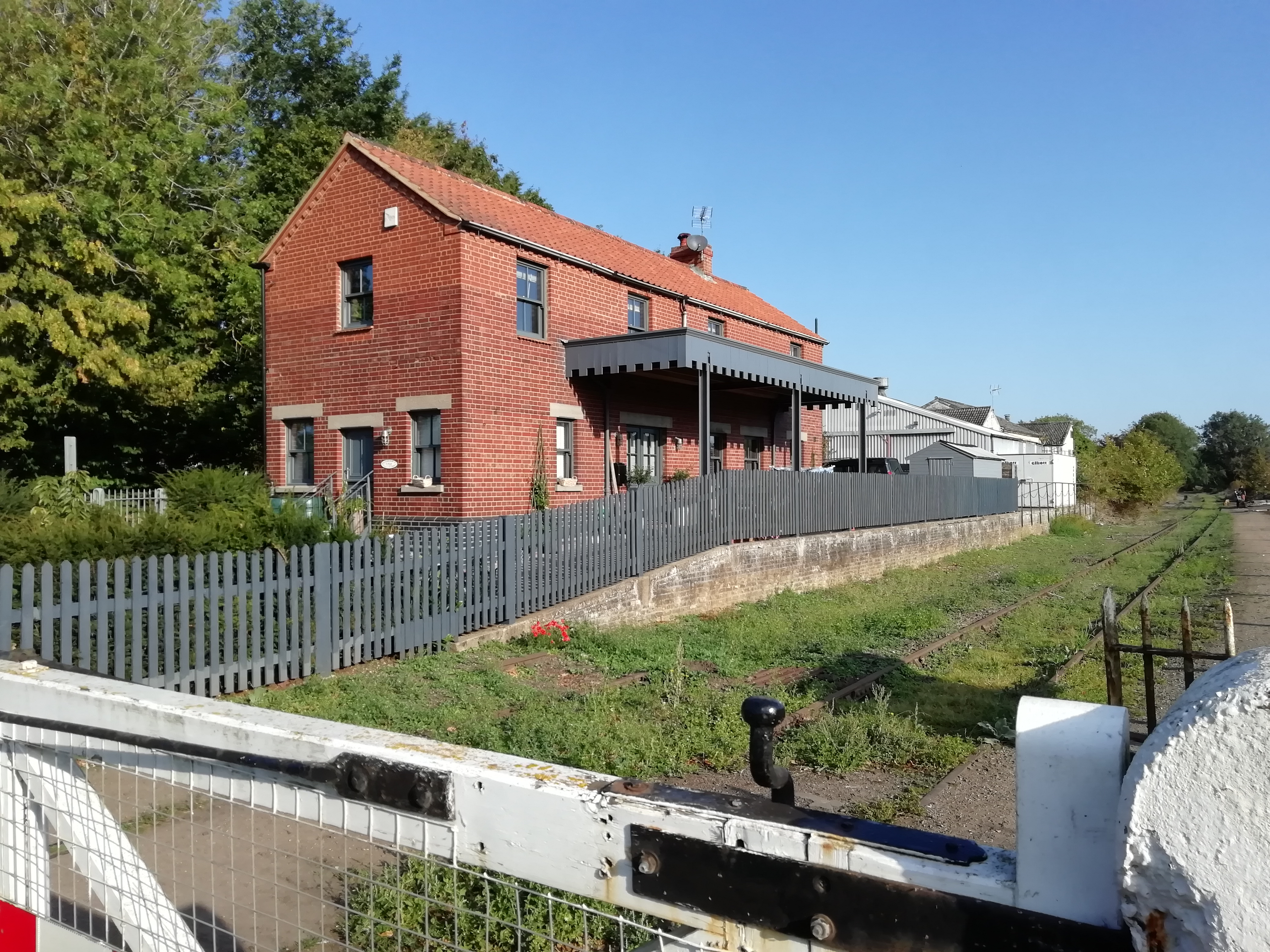
- Former station building

General information
- Location: North Elmham, Breckland, Norfolk; England
- Grid reference: TF993203
- System: Station on heritage railway
- Platforms: 1

Other information
- Status: Disused

History
- Pre-grouping: Eastern Counties Railway; Great Eastern Railway
- Post-grouping: London & North Eastern Railway; Eastern Region of British Railways; Mid-Norfolk Railway

Key dates
- 20 March 1849: Opened as Elmham
- 1 September 1872: Renamed North Elmham
- 5 October 1964: Closed to passengers
Location

North Elmham railway station served the village of North Elmham in the English county of Norfolk. The station was part of the Wymondham to Wells Branch (1849 - 1989) and is part of a section of the line being restored by the Mid-Norfolk Railway from Dereham to County School.

== History ==
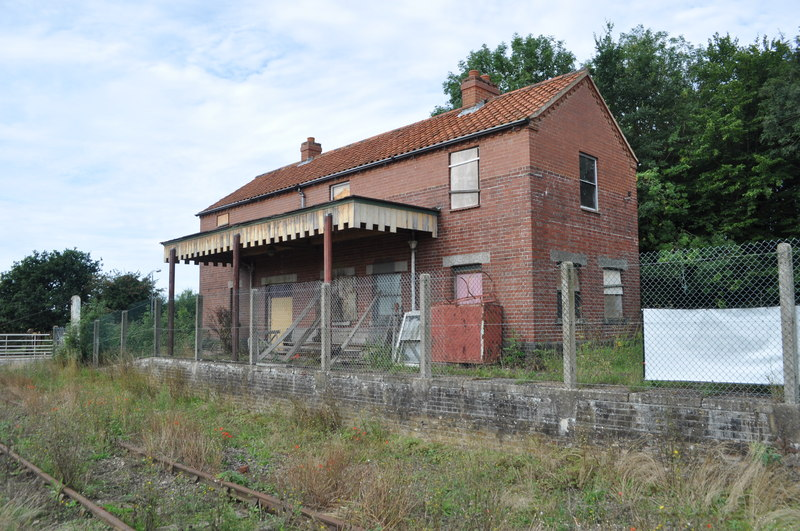
The derelict station building in 2010, prior to restoration as a home.

The station was equipped with a single passenger platform on the down line. This line was flanked by a goods loop. The station was rebuilt by the London & North Eastern Railway, with a simple brick building replacing the earlier timber-framed building. Passenger trains were not permitted to pass at this station.

A collision took place close to the station on 14 December 1882.

=== Goods trains ===
North Elmham was the location for a rail served dairy, with daily milk trains operating from the station to Ilford. A shunting horse was used at Elmham to move loaded milk wagons from the down to the up side of the line for collection. The dairy closed in October 1963.

The station also dealt in grain and fertilizer traffic.

== Present day ==
Some materials are currently on site from the former Cambridge - St Ives railway to construct a new platform in preparation for the opening of the MNR's northern section for passengers. Construction of a new platform and the pace of track restoration between Hoe and North Elmham which relies on volunteer labour and charitable donations.

It had been proposed that there could be an additional halt built between this location and Dereham in the small hamlet of Hoe, a popular location for walkers. The Mid-Norfolk Railway's volunteers are instead concentrating efforts on restoring the line progressively towards North Elmham.

Although there are no passenger train services near this station at this time, a Transport Works Order (The Mid-Norfolk Railway Order 2001) is in place allowing the Mid-Norfolk Railway Preservation Trust to operate trains from Dereham. Planning permission for the relaying and operation of the line between County School and North Elmham was granted by Breckland District Council on 9 November 1992, with initial tracklaying starting soon after. This grants permission, associated with the original enabling act, to operate a railway beyond the buffers north of North Elmham station (at 52°44′53″N 0°57′09″E), where The Mid-Norfolk Railway Order 2001 ends. Engineering trains have operated as far as the level crossing beside the former station site since 2019.

Disused railways
County School; Line and station closed	British Rail; Eastern Region; Wymondham to Wells via East Dereham	Dereham; Line open, station open No scheduled passenger service
	Proposed service	
County School	Norfolk Orbital Railway; Mid-Norfolk Railway	Dereham
Preceding station	Heritage railways	Following station
Proposed extension
County School towards Ryburgh	Mid-Norfolk Railway	Dereham towards Wymondham Abbey
