= County School railway station =

Railway station in Norfolk, England

County School
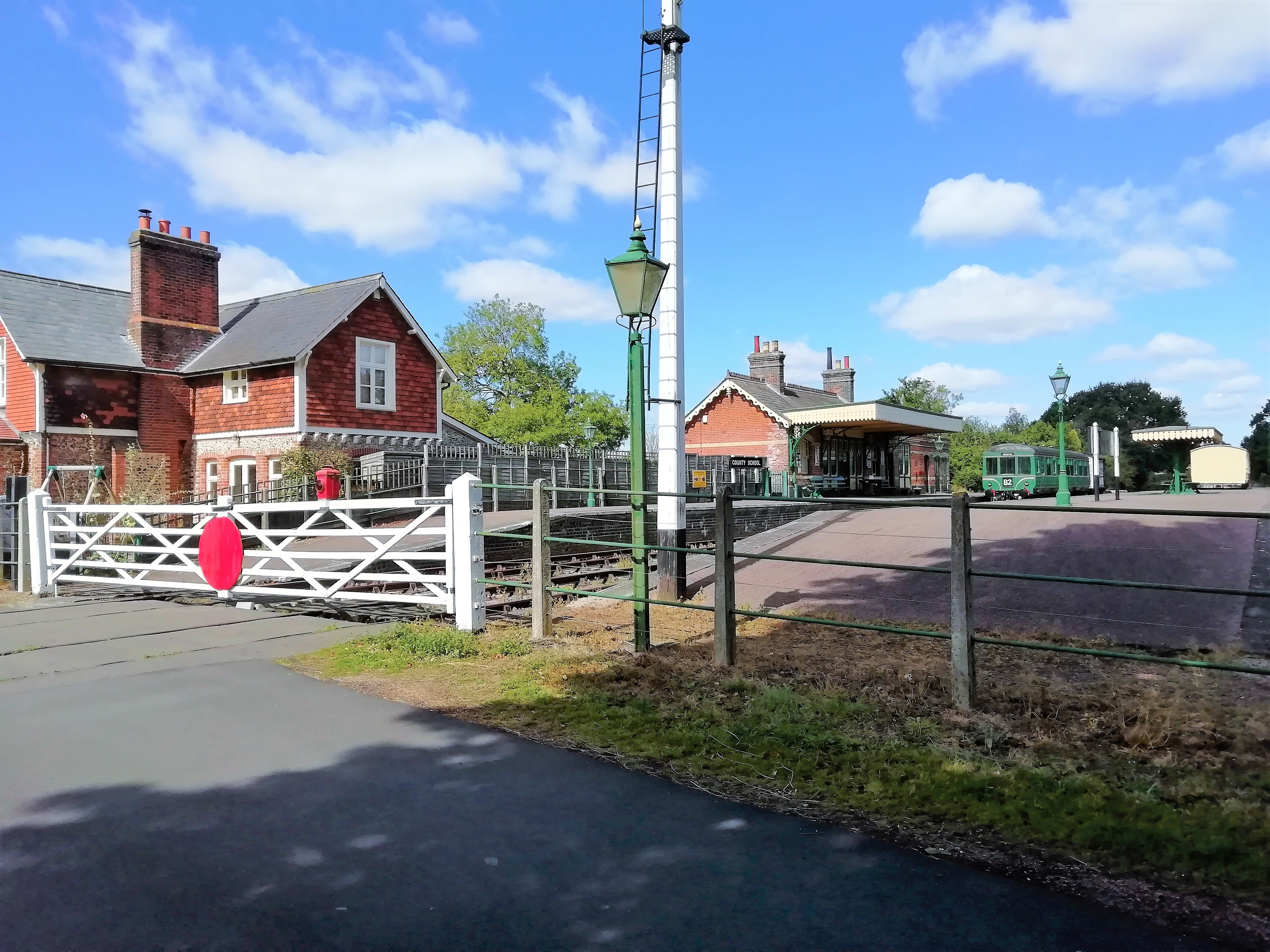
- County School station, September 2019

General information
- Location: North Elmham, Breckland, Norfolk; England
- Coordinates: 52°45′56″N 00°56′53″E
- Grid reference: TF990227
- System: Station on heritage railway
- Owner: Great Eastern Railway; London & North Eastern Railway; Eastern Region of British Railways; Breckland District Council; Mid-Norfolk Railway
- Platforms: 3

Key dates
- 1 March 1884: Opened
- 13 July 1964: Closed to freight
- 5 October 1964: Closed to passengers
- 1987: Station opens as heritage centre
Location

County School railway station is on the Mid-Norfolk Railway in Norfolk, England; it will serve the villages of North Elmham and Guist once services resume. It is 17 miles 40 chains (28 km) down the line from Wymondham and is the northernmost station owned by the Mid-Norfolk Railway Preservation Trust. The station was a stop on the Wymondham to Wells Branch, which closed to passengers in 1964; it was also the western terminus of the East Norfolk Railway branch to Wroxham, which closed in 1952. The line from Dereham is being restored gradually by the Mid-Norfolk Railway.

== History ==
=== Opening ===
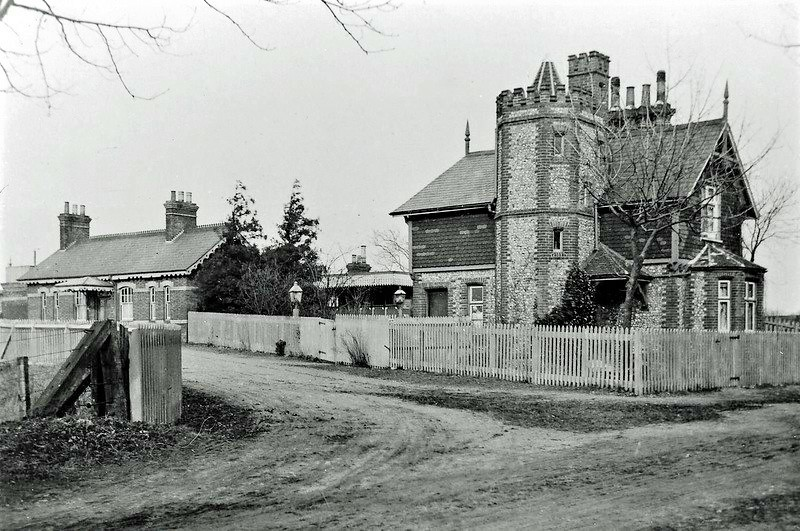
The station and stationmaster's house, under the Great Eastern Railway

A railway line was opened as part of the Norfolk Railway's extension from East Dereham to Fakenham in 1849; it reached Wells by 1857. County School railway station was built by the Great Eastern Railway in 1884, to serve the boarding school from which it took its name and following the completion of the East Norfolk Railway's branch line from Wroxham and Aylsham in 1882. In 1903, the Norfolk County School became the Watts Naval School, although the station name remained unchanged.

County School was built as a rural junction station, even though the Wroxham branch left the Wells line a mile north at Broom Green. The station consisted of up and down platforms and an extra bay for Wroxham services. The journey to Norwich from County School could be made in either direction: 27 miles via Dereham and Wymondham or 32 miles via Wroxham. The stationmaster's house was not built by the railway; it had been the lodge house for the school instead and its style reflects the school rather than the station. Other than the school, the station served only a scattering of houses.

County School station was equipped with three platforms, two platform buildings, two signal boxes and a small coal yard. This yard was essentially to serve the needs of the large number of open fireplaces in the school buildings. The station also had a large orchard on land provided for sidings that were never required.

=== 1915 crash ===
Photograph of the 1915 accident.

On 20 January 1915, the junction with the line to Aylsham and Wroxham was the site of an accident between a passenger train from Wells and a goods train from Foulsham.

At 11.46 am, GER Y14 0-6-0 No. 629, hauling 12 empty and four loaded wagons, ran into the six-coach passenger train, hauled by GER T26 2-4-0 No. '446' and consisting of six-wheel stock on the scissor crossing close to the signal box. Nobody was injured in the crash, which took place at low speed, although both locomotives were damaged, along with other vehicles in both trains.

The responsibility for the crash was placed on the driver of the goods train, for failing to observe that his signals were at danger.

GER T26 '446' survived the accident to become LNER '7446', eventually being withdrawn in April 1927. GER Y14 '629' also survived, joining the LNER as '7629' and being withdrawn in September 1926. A buffer believed to be from the tender of 629 (as this was the only vehicle listed as having such damage in the accident report) is displayed at the station, after being discovered buried in a bank at the accident site.

=== 1918 accident ===
On 14 March 1918, the horse pulling a milk float bolted, jumped the level crossing gate and set off along the railway towards North Elmham. A down train was approaching the station, but managed to stop close to the southern signal box before it was struck by the oncoming milk float, with the horse continuing towards Elmham.

=== World War II ===
During World War II, the station surroundings were used as a fuel dump for the airfield at Foulsham. The site was also briefly used as a tarmac factory for Bomber Command.

=== Nationalisation ===
The first significant change occurred in 1952, when the County School to Wroxham line was closed to passenger traffic; however, the western section of this line, between County School and Foulsham, remained open for goods until 31 October 1964, being busiest in the sugar beet season. Diesel trains made their first appearance in 1956. In 1959, the complex track layout and quiet nature of the station since the closure of the branch led to its being used as a main location for the filming of the driver training films for the new diesel multiple units. In 1964 the station closed when the Dereham to Wells line lost its passenger service.

=== After closure to passengers ===
Just after closure, the station was used by Anglia Television as a location for Weaver's Green. This was a twice-weekly serial, based on a fictional vets' practice in an East Anglian village with a post office and shop, church, pub, railway station and racing stable. Two vets, played by Grant Taylor and Eric Flynn, were the central characters; Wendy Richard, of EastEnders, and Kate O'Mara, who was to join the cast of Dynasty, played minor roles. Soon after this filming took place, the island platform buildings and signal box were demolished.

The line remained open for freight until the withdrawal of goods traffic from Ryburgh in 1981, with the track removed by British Rail in 1983. The main building survived as a small factory unit making plaster ceiling roses.

== Preservation schemes ==
=== Fakenham and Dereham Railway Society ===
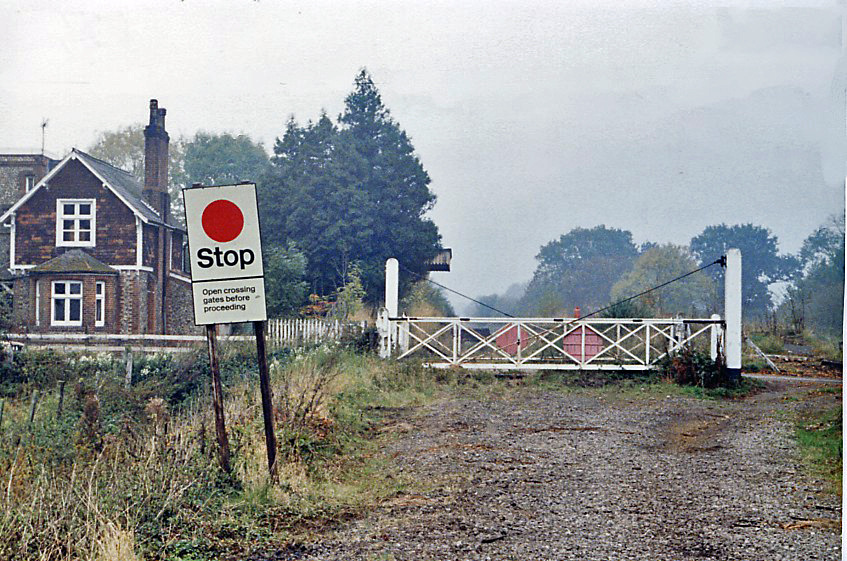
With lifted track in April 1986

Breckland District Council bought the station in 1987, intending to use it as a visitor centre, but felt that a station without track and trains looked wrong. The Fakenham and Dereham Railway Society (F&DRS) were offered a 999-year lease to move to the site from their headquarters at Yaxham and restore the tracks and operate the railway side of the site. By May 1990, track had been restored through platform 1, with a Ruston diesel and LMS brake van actively displayed and the short line being inspected for passenger operation on 21 June 1990. During this inspection it was revealed that the enabling Act for the line had never been extinguished.

On 28 September 1990, the F&DRS voted to change their name to the Mid Norfolk Railway Society, with the line through the station being passed for passenger operations by Her Majesty's Railway Inspectorate on 16 September 1991. Planning permission for the relaying of the line to North Elmham was granted by Breckland District Council on 9 November 1992, with relaying work, using recovered materials, commencing soon after.

=== Great Eastern Railway (1989) Limited ===
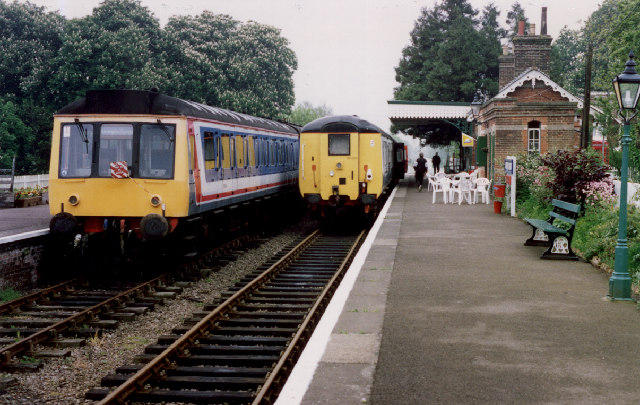
Services operating in April 1993

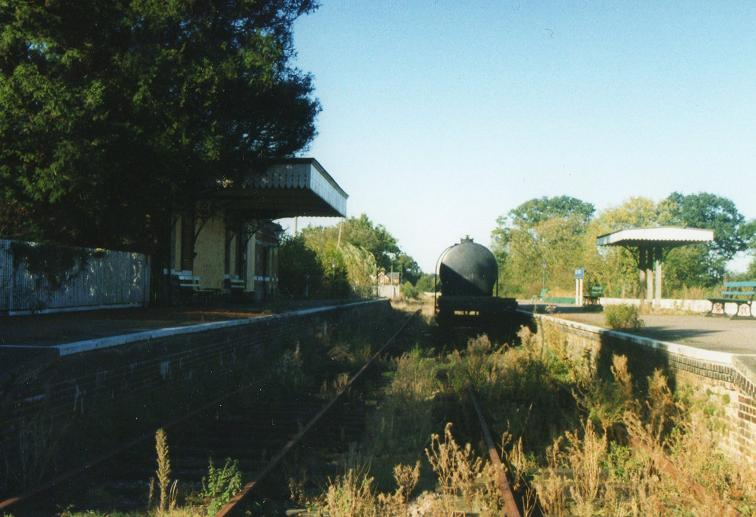
County School in 1996

With the announcement of the closure of the entire branch between Wymondham, Dereham and North Elmham, a new company called Great Eastern Railway (1989) Limited was formed to save the line.

The F&DRS backed this scheme, and the lease of the station was signed over to GER (1989) Ltd. Although far from certain, the future of the line, and County School station, seemed more secure than it had for many years. During these years, the F&DRS continued to provide financial backing and manpower for the development of the site. The running line was extended over half a mile towards North Elmham, and a collection of rolling stock was built up.

During the early 1990s, GER (1989) Ltd. announced plans to lift the railway between Dereham and Wymondham. The F&DRS withdrew their support for GER (1989) Ltd. and made their own bid for the line. In 1995 Yorkshire Bank called in the receivers to solve concerns with The Great Eastern Railway (1989) Limited.

In June 1995 Breckland Council informed the receivers that they wished for GER (1989) Ltd. to give up the lease for County School station so that they could review their operations in respect of the site. GER (1989) Ltd., who stated that they were attracting 12,000 visitors a year to the site, announced that they would contest this decision.

In July 1995, police were called in to investigate the sudden and unauthorised road transfer of two Mid Norfolk Railway Society Mark 2 coaches to a breaker's yard at nearby Lenwade. In July 1996 Breckland District Council issued a threat to stop trains running at County School station, as it was found that someone other than the leaseholder was operating trains at the site; the lease being non-transferable.

In November 1996 Breckland District Council brought in 24-hour security guards at the County School site to prevent the stripping of the property after having served an eviction order on GER (1989) Ltd. in mid-October.

County School station was boarded up and GER (1989) Ltd. rolling stock was concentrated in the isolated yard prior to disposal or scrapping. All track north of the station platforms was then lifted, and, as shown in the photograph, the site was left to become derelict.

==== Locomotives and diesel units based on GER (1989) Ltd. ====
Number and name	Description	Notes	Photograph
1 'County School'	Ruston 0-4-0	To Mid-Norfolk Railway, now Bressingham Steam Museum.	
2 'Horsa'	Bagnall 0-4-0	To Hardingham railway station.	
3	Drewry 0-4-0	To Hardingham railway station, now Barrow Hill Engine Shed.	
2168 "Edmundsons"	Barclay 0-4-0 ST	To Rushden Station Railway Museum.	
2918 "Pony"	Hawthorn Leslie 0-4-0 ST	To Chatham Dockyard (as "Achilles"), and now East Kent Railway	
7845	Robert Stephenson and Hawthorns 0-6-0 T	To Hawes railway station (as "67345").	
20069	British Rail Class 20 Bo-Bo	To Mid-Norfolk Railway, then Harry Needle Railroad Company	
20206	British Rail Class 20 Bo-Bo	To Mid-Norfolk Railway, then scrap to Booth-Roe Metals	
79976	British Rail AC Cars Railbus	To Colne Valley Railway, then Great Central Railway, now Nemesis Rail.	
51669 / 59664 / 51849	British Rail Class 115 3-car DMU	To Spa Valley Railway (51669 and 51849 (for scrap)) and Midsomer Norton (59664 (as static buffet))	

=== Mid-Norfolk Railway Preservation Trust (MNRPT) ===
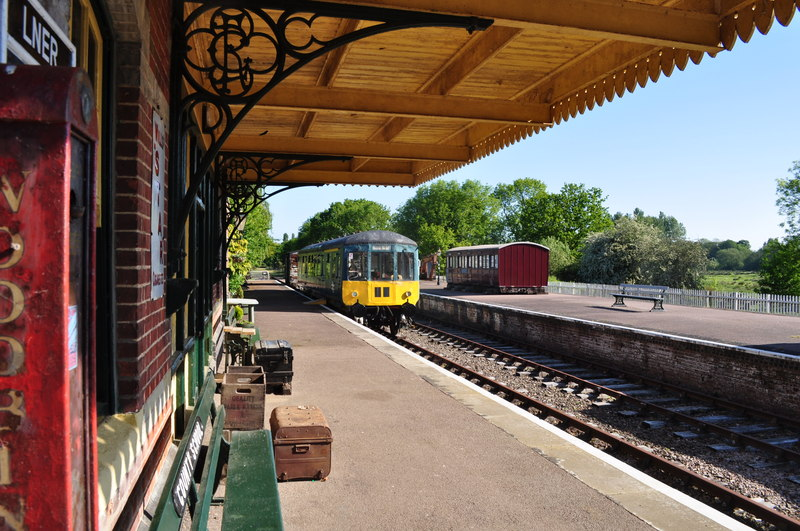
Platform 1, facing Fakenham, June 2010.

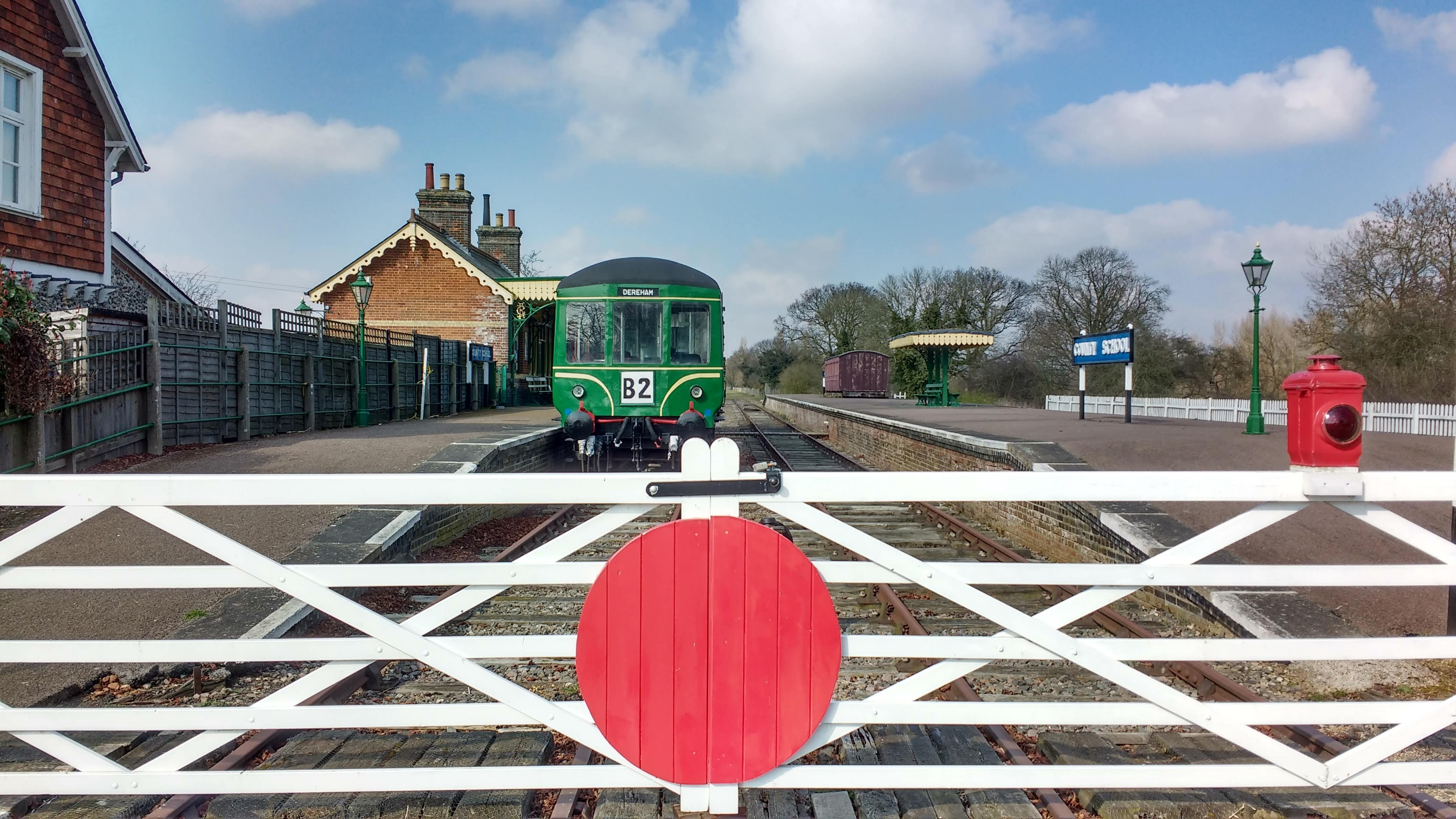
County School station in 2017.

In 1998 the MNRPT signed a tenancy-at-will with Breckland District Council to take over the station and trackbed at County School. The track north of the platforms had, again, been lifted. The remainder was overgrown. The station was boarded up, with smashed glass, a stripped interior and broken windows.

The MNR quickly returned the station to use, initially as a visitor centre rather than an operational railway museum. Over the next year, the MNR spent £28,000 restoring the station buildings to wartime London and North Eastern Railway condition, tidying the grounds and removing scrap material left by the former lessee. Additional investment saw the station drive, damaged after decades of neglect, professionally resurfaced, scrub growth removed from the railway formation opening up the views of the Wensum Valley for walkers and preparing the formation for restoration of track.

Recognising the financial and manpower investment that the MNRPT had put into the site over the years, Breckland District Council offered to sell the station and trackbed to the railway for the nominal sum of £1. This offer was accepted, and County School became part of the 17-mile-long branch line. The station has been restored to initially operate as a museum, visitor centre and "terminus in waiting". The trackbed between County School and North Elmham is being restored as part of the restoration of the line, along with the retention of a permissive footpath. A longer-term aim is the rebuilding of the demolished island platform building. No standard gauge trains operate at the station, although a miniature railway began development in 2020. The station forms an important key in the plans of the Mid-Norfolk Railway, and will serve as the northern terminus of the line while the task of restoring the line towards Fakenham is considered.

=== Wensum Valley Miniature Railway ===
In 2019 the Mid-Norfolk Railway entered an agreement with the North Norfolk Model Engineering Club, who were looking to relocate their miniature railway from Holt on the North Norfolk Railway. This has seen a new 1,600 feet-long miniature line created on part of the East Norfolk Railway's formation north of station site, with a return loop crossing the main Norfolk Railway formation and a small depot facility. Planning permission for the development was given in 2021, and the first section opened to the public as the 'Wensum Valley Miniature Railway' in 2022.

=== Norfolk Orbital Railway ===
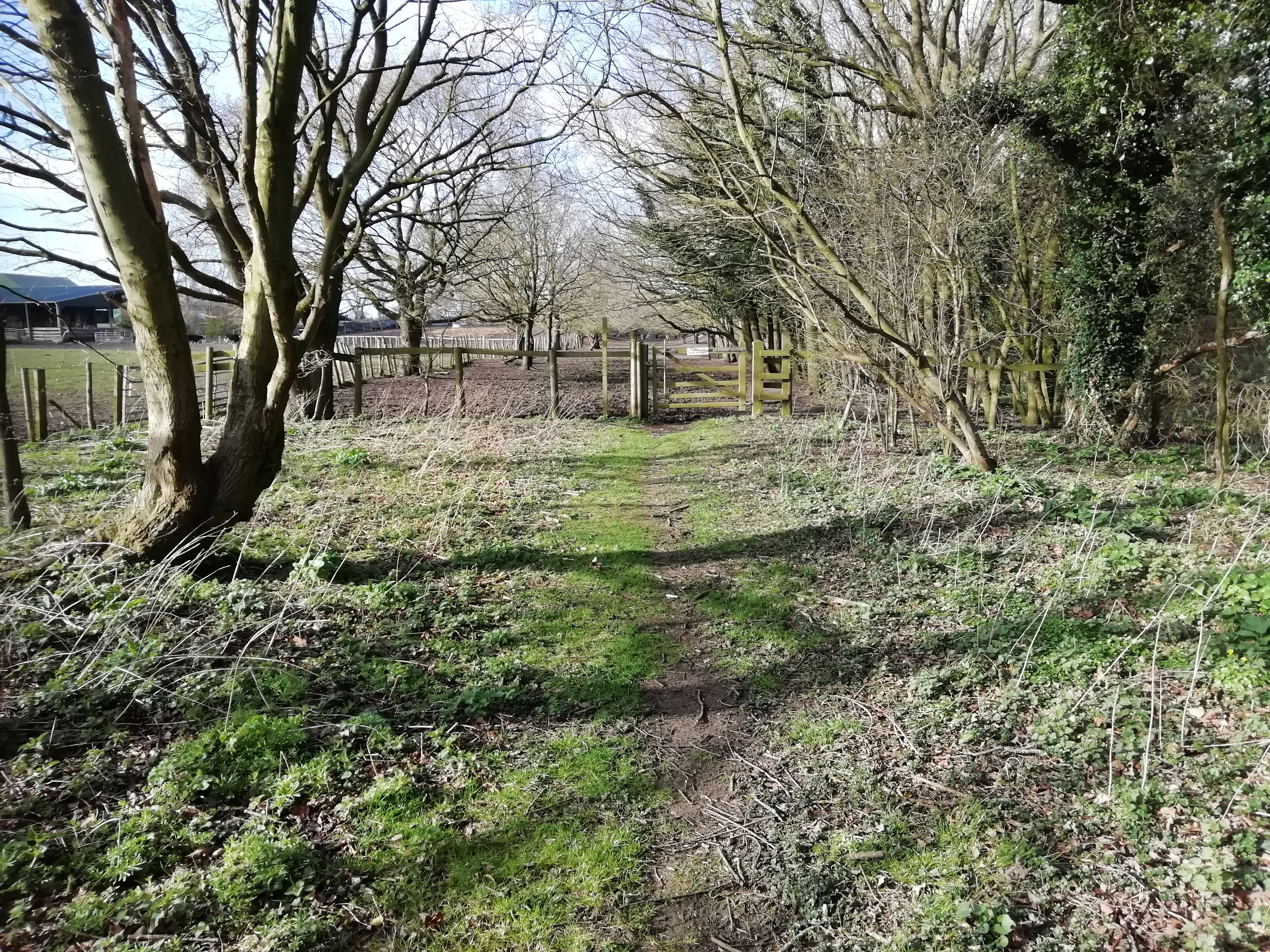
The northern boundary of the Mid-Norfolk Railway, looking towards Fakenham

Restoration of the line between County School and Fakenham is being progressed by the Norfolk Orbital Railway, independent of the Mid-Norfolk Railway, who have started to purchase sections of the former route. The route north towards Fakenham is protected by North Norfolk District Council from any development that would be prejudicial to the restoration of a railway line and is included in the proposals of the Campaign for Better Transport

== Signal boxes ==
Location	Status	Built by	Notes	Photograph
County School (Junction)	Locking room only	Great Eastern Railway	The station had been provided with a Type 4 signal box to the north of the station. The original signal box was mostly demolished after the line closed to passengers but the locking room was restored to accommodate the Type 3 signal box cabin from Halesworth, donated to the MNR in 2007. It arrived in unexpectedly poor condition, which resulted in it being removed for preservation by the Mangapps Railway Museum in 2017. The location of this original box is not considered suitable to future operational needs, but is intended to be restored and used for other purposes.	
County School (South)	Demolished	Great Eastern Railway	The station had a smaller signal cabin to the south of the level crossing. The 'box was demolished prior to the closure of the line, but can be located in aerial photographs of the site taken in 1948. The location of this box is considered to make it potentially suitable for restoration as an operational structure.	

== Train services ==
Disused railways
Terminus	British Rail; Eastern Region; County School to Wroxham	Foulsham; Line and station closed
Ryburgh; Line and station closed	British Rail; Eastern Region; Wymondham to Wells via East Dereham	North Elmham; Line and station closed
	Proposed service	
Ryburgh	Norfolk Orbital Railway; Mid-Norfolk Railway	North Elmham
Preceding station	Heritage railways	Following station
Proposed extension
Ryburgh Terminus	Mid-Norfolk Railway	North Elmham towards Wymondham Abbey

== See also ==
- List of closed railway stations in Britain
- List of closed railway stations in Norfolk
