= Vats =

Vats or VATS may refer to:

== People ==
- Vats (clan), a gotra of Brahmins found in India
- Anil Jha Vats (born 1974), Indian politician
- D.P. Vats, Indian politician
- Madho Sarup Vats (1896–1955), Indian archaeologist and Sanskrit scholar
- Pathik Vats, Ienglisg director
- Rajeswar Vats (born 1953), Indian cricketer
- S. C. Vats (born 1945), Indian politician
- Sumit Vats (born 1982), Indian journalist turned actor

== Places ==
- Vats, Rogaland, a village in Vindafjord Municipality, Rogaland county, Norway
- Vats Church, parish church in the village of Vats in Vindafjord Municipality, Rogaland county, Norway
- Vats Municipality, former municipality in Rogaland county, Norway
- Vats-houll, a settlement in the Shetland islands, Scotland

== Other uses ==
- Video-assisted thoracoscopic surgery
  - VATS lobectomy
- Vault-Tec Assisted Targeting System, in the Fallout video games

== See also ==
- Vat (disambiguation)
- Wat (disambiguation)
- WATS (disambiguation)
