= WOT =

WOT, WoT, or wot may refer to:

== Arts and entertainment ==
- "Wot" (song), a 1982 single from Captain Sensible
- The Wheel of Time, a 1990 fantasy novel series by Robert Jordan
- World of Tanks, a 2010 online war game

== Military ==
- War on terror (2001–2021)
- Wojska Obrony Terytorialnej, a Polish reserve force

== Places ==
- Wot, Nepal
- Wang-an Airport, Taiwan

== Science, technology and mathematics ==
- Weak operator topology, in functional analysis
- Web of Things, objects connected to the Web
- Web of trust, for authenticating cryptographic keys
- Wide open throttle, in an internal combustion engine
- WOT Services, an online reputation service

== Other uses ==
- Wot (musical instrument), a circular panpipe in Laos and Thailand
- Currie Wot, a 1930s British aircraft
- Wat (food), an Ethiopian/Eritrean stew
- wot, internet slang for "what"
- Fordson WOT, truck family produced by Ford of Britain in the Second World War

== See also ==
- WAT (disambiguation)
- Watt (disambiguation)
- What (disambiguation)
- WOTS, a radio station in Kissimmee, Florida
