= WATS =

WATS may refer to:

- Warrick Area Transit System, a transit agency serving Warrick County, Indiana
- Wide Area Telephone Service, a phone service for U.S. telecommunications
- Wide Area Tracking System, a system for detecting ground-based nuclear weapons
- We Are the Strange, a 2007 independent animated film
- WATS (AM), a radio station (960 AM) licensed to Sayre, Pennsylvania, United States
- Workshop for Armenian/Turkish Scholarship, a group of scholars exploring the Armenian Genocide

== See also ==
- Wat (disambiguation)
- Watt (disambiguation)
- Watts (disambiguation)
- Vat (disambiguation)
- Vats (disambiguation)
