= Watts =

Watts is most likely to refer to:

- Watt (plural: watts), a unit of power
- Watts, Los Angeles, California, a city district

Watts may also refer to:

== Places ==
=== United Kingdom ===
- Watts Bank, a nature reserve in Berkshire, England
- Watts Hill, Dorset, England

=== United States ===
- Watts, Oklahoma, a town
- Watts Branch (disambiguation)
- Watts Community, Oklahoma, a census-designated place
- Watts Island, near Watts Island Light, a lighthouse in Chesapeake Bay
- Watts Township, Perry County, Pennsylvania

=== Outer space ===
- 1798 Watts, an asteroid
- Watts (crater), on the Moon

=== Other places ===
- Watts River, Victoria, Australia
- Watts Point, British Columbia, Canada

== Buildings ==
- Watts Building (Birmingham, Alabama), on the National Register of Historic Places
- Watts Cemetery Chapel, in Surrey, England
- Watts Towers, 17 sculptural towers in Los Angeles, U.S.
- Britannia Hotel, a listed building in Manchester, England, formerly known as "Watts Warehouse"

== Businesses ==
- Watts & Co., an English architecture and interior design company founded in 1874
- Watts Gallery, an art gallery in Surrey, England
- Watts Water Technologies, a company in the United States that makes water valves

== Other uses ==
- Watts (surname), a list of people with the surname Watts
- Watts family murders, in Colorado (2018)
- USS Watts, a U.S. Navy destroyer
- Watts Hospital, the first hospital in Durham, North Carolina
- Watts Line, a former rail line in Los Angeles, California
- Watts Station, a historic train station in Watts, Los Angeles
- Watts Naval School, Norfolk, England, a former boarding school

== See also ==
- Watt (disambiguation)
- WATS (disambiguation)
- WAT (disambiguation)
