= WUT =

WUT, Wut or wut may refer to:

== Acronyms and abbreviations ==
- Warsaw University of Technology, in Poland
- Wroclaw University of Technology, in Poland
- Wuhan University of Technology, in China
- Xinzhou Wutaishan Airport, in China (IATA code)
- Wichita Union Terminal Railway, a railroad in Kansas

== Other uses ==
- Wut (album), by Hämatom, 2008
- Wut Tola (born 2002), Cambodian footballer
- Wut Hmone Shwe Yi (born 1988), Burmese actress
- wut, Internet slang for "what"
- "Wut", song by American rapper Le1f

== See also ==
- Wut Wut, a 2018 album by Dillon Francis
- Wat (disambiguation)
- Watt (disambiguation)
- What (disambiguation)
