= Fakenham and Dereham Railway Society =

UK railway company

Coordinates: 52°45′56″N 00°56′53″E

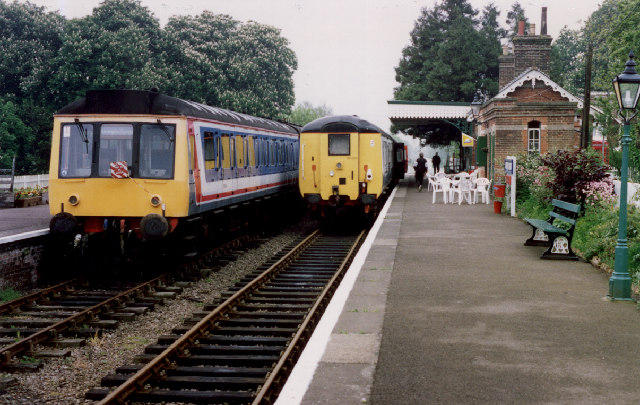
County School railway station in 1993, including F&DRS DBSO 9393 (right)

The Fakenham and Dereham Railway Society (F&DRS) was a heritage railway society in the English county of Norfolk. For a short period of time it operated County School railway station as the Wensum Valley Railway. The F&DRS later became the Mid-Norfolk Railway Preservation Trust, owners and operators of the Mid-Norfolk Railway.

== History ==
In 1983, after a 1980 attempt to preserve the Ryburgh to Fakenham section of the Wymondham to Wells branch, the Fakenham and Dereham Railway Society leased Hardingham station and opened a small heritage centre. Track was laid in the former goods yard and a Ruston 0-4-0 diesel locomotive was delivered to the site. Income failed to cover the rent and rates, and the Society was forced to move out when the site was auctioned in 1986 - moving to a temporary location at Yaxham station.

In 1987 the station at County School was purchased by Breckland District Council, and the F&DRS were granted a 999-year lease, invited to lay track and relocate to the site. The intention was to relay track to meet up with the British Rail railhead at North Elmham to connect with charter trains operating over the branch. This plan was abandoned when complete closure of the line from June 1989 was announced.

In April 1989 the Fakenham and Dereham Railway Society became part of the Mid Norfolk Railway Project, along with the Wymondham and Dereham Rail Action Committee, the Dereham Society and the Wymondham Heritage Society. The MNRP, an alliance of independent bodies interested in the future of the line, was established to focus interest in the preservation of the route. During the following 18 months this alliance evolved into a single body, with WyDRAC members being assimilated into the F&DRS, and the latter voting to change its name to be the Mid Norfolk Railway Society in November 1989.

The station building at County School was formally opened by John Timpson on 15 June 1990, who was brought into the station on a short train consisting of the Ruston diesel and LMS brake van.

== Former Rolling Stock ==
=== Diesel locomotives and shunters ===
Number & Name	Description	Notes
1 'County School'	Ruston 0-4-0	To Mid-Norfolk Railway, now Bressingham Steam Museum.

=== Carriages ===
Built for	Number	Type	Designation	Notes
British Railways	9393	Mk2a	BSO	Vacuum Brake, converted as DBSO To Lincolnshire Wolds Railway
British Railways	94869	-	CCT(Y)	Vacuum Brake To Elsecar Railway

=== Goods stock ===
Built for	Number	Type	Notes
LMS	DM 731920	20t brake van	Built 1945 to lot 1387. To Rushden, Higham and Wellingborough Railway.
