= Foulsham =

Village in Norfolk, England

Coordinates: 52.781°N 1.011°E

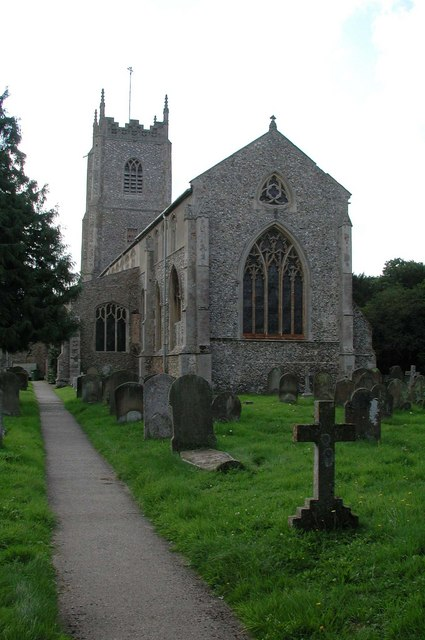
- Church of the Holy Innocents, Foulsham

- Location within Norfolk
- Area: 4.85 sq mi (12.6 km^{2})
- Population: 1,028 (2021 census)
  - Density: 212/sq mi (82/km^{2})
- OS grid reference: TG0325
  - London: 119 miles (192 km)
- Civil parish: Foulsham CP
- District: Broadland
- Shire county: Norfolk
- Region: East
- Country: England
- Sovereign state: United Kingdom
- Post town: DEREHAM
- Postcode district: NR20
- Dialling code: 01362
- Police: Norfolk
- Fire: Norfolk
- Ambulance: East of England
- UK Parliament: Broadland and Fakenham

Foulsham is a village and civil parish in the English county of Norfolk. It is 7.40 miles (11.91 km) north-east of Dereham and 16 miles (26 km) north-west of Norwich.

== History ==
The name Foulsham is of Anglo-Saxon origin.

The village has been the site of major Bronze Age discoveries, including a golden torc ploughed-up in 1846 and a hoard of 141 copper-socketed axeheads, discovered in 1953 and now in the care of Norwich Castle Museum.

In the Domesday Book, Foulsham is listed as a settlement of 103 households in the hundred of Eynesford. In 1086, the village was part of the East Anglian estates of King William I. The worth of Foulsham is recorded as two churches, a mill, twelve cattle, four hundred pigs, fifty goats and 13 sesters of honey.

Old Hall Farm was built in the parish in the 16th-Century and was at one time the residence of Maj-Gen. Philip Skippon, a Parliamentarian commander at the Battle of Naseby.

In the Seventeenth Century, Foulsham was a thriving market place until a store of gunpowder exploded on the 15 June 1770 which led to a fire that consumed the whole market place.

Foulsham railway station opened in 1882 as a stop on the Great Eastern Railway line between Aylsham South and County School. The station closed in 1964 as part of the Beeching cuts, with Foulsham's closest railway station today being Sheringham for Bittern Line services to Cromer and Norwich.

RAF Foulsham opened in 1942 as an air-base for various squadrons of No. 3 Group and No. 100 Group RAF throughout the Second World War. On 28 July 1943, RAF Foulsham was the site of a forced landing by a B-17 Flying Fortress piloted by Lt-Col. John C. Morgan after a strategic bombing raid of Hanover. For his actions, Morgan was awarded the Medal of Honor. The airbase was retired in 1945 and the Ministry of Defence eventually sold the land in the 1980s.

== Geography ==
According to the 2021 census, Foulsham has a population of 1,028 people which shows an increase from the 1,021 people recorded in the 2011 census.

== Church of the Holy Innocents ==
Foulsham's parish church is dedicated to the Holy Innocents and dates from the 14th-century. The church has been Grade I listed since 1961.

The church was severely damaged by an explosion and fire in 1770 but was heavily restored in the Victorian era. Inside the church is a 16th-century font and some fragments of 15th-century stained-glass.

== Amenities ==
The village has a public house which has operated on its current site since the mid-19th-century. The majority of local children attend Foulsham Primary School.

== Puritan emigration ==
The village gave its name to a family of Puritan dissidents, who fled England for the town of Hingham, Massachusetts and whose spelling of the name was slightly changed to Folsom. Today, these American descendants of Foulsham have given rise to Folsom, California, Folsom Street in San Francisco, Folsom Prison (all named for California pioneer and New Hampshire native Joseph Libbey Folsom), as well as General Nathaniel Folsom, who represented New Hampshire in the Continental Congress.

== Notable people ==
- Maj-Gen. Philip Skippon (1600–1660) – Parliamentarian officer, lived in Foulsham
- Reverend John Astley (1735–1803) – clergyman and Rector of Foulsham from 1771 to 1803

== Governance ==
Foulsham is part of the electoral ward of Eynesford for local elections and is part of the district of Broadland. It is in the Broadland and Fakenham parliamentary constituency.
