= Spong Hill =

Coordinates: 52.737°N 0.934°E

- Location of Spong Hill
- Location: Norfolk, England

Spong Hill is an Anglo-Saxon cemetery site located south of North Elmham in Norfolk, England. It is the largest known Early Anglo-Saxon cremation site. The site consists of a large cremation cemetery and a smaller, 6th-century burial cemetery of 57 inhumations. Several of the inhumation graves were covered by small barrows and others were marked by the use of coffins.

Extensive excavations of the Early Anglo-Saxon cemetery and part of the associated settlement revealed evidence of Early Prehistoric occupation on the hill top, dating from the Mesolithic to the Early Bronze Age. Excavation of the Anglo-Saxon cemetery also revealed extensive occupation evidence: late Iron Age and Roman enclosures and field boundaries, an early Roman kiln, and a small settlement of 'sunken huts' and post-hole buildings possibly contemporary with the cemetery.

== Context ==
Spong Hill contains 2259 cremations and 57 inhumations. The site was in use for around 150 years during which 2,500 to 3,000 individuals were buried. This implies it served a population of around 750 people; much larger than a single contemporary settlement and suggests the cemetery served a number of local communities.

There have been a number of finds of cremation urns, the first being reported in 1711. There was a small scale excavation in the 1950s and a further investigation in 1968. The full scale excavation between 1972 and 1981 was directed by Dr Catherine Hills and funded by the Department of the Environment.

The findings at Spong Hill and suggests that the Anglo-Saxon settlement of Britain started earlier than the traditional start date of AD 450, with a significant number of finds from before this. It also suggests a possible synthesis of Anglo-Saxon and continental material culture.

== Notable finds ==
=== Spong Man ===
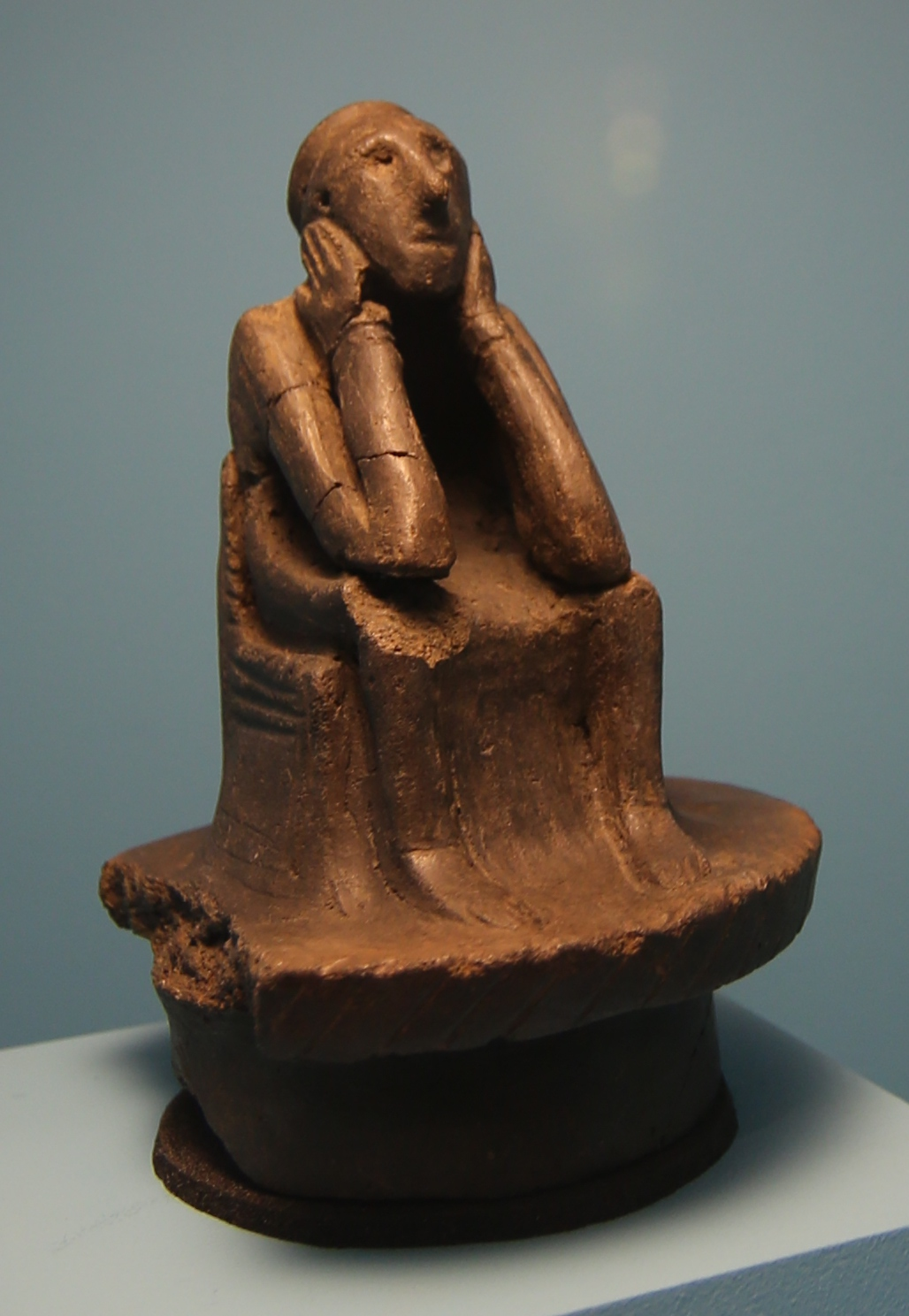
The Spong Man lid at Norwich Castle Museum and Art Gallery

"Spong Man" is the pottery lid of a cremation urn in the shape of a seated figure. Unearthed in 1979, it is one of the few Anglo-Saxon three-dimensional human figures ever found. The lid is 14.3 centimetres in height.

Spong Man is normally on display at Norwich Castle Museum and Art Gallery. It was loaned to the "Anglo-Saxon Kingdoms: Art, Word, War" exhibition at the British Library in 2018/9.

Thermoluminescent dating indicates the lid was fired between 460 and 1090 AD. It is regarded as the most elaborate known example of an Anglo-Saxon funeral urn lid.

=== Stamped urns ===
Three 5th-century cremation urns from the Spong Hill site bear the impression of the debated term alu by "the same runic stamp" in mirror-runes.

== See also ==
- List of Anglo-Saxon cemeteries
- Sutton Hoo

== Bibliography ==
- The Anglo-Saxon Cemetery at Spong Hill, North Elmham, Norfolk, Parts I to VIII. See East Anglain Archaeol. 6, 11 (out of print), 21 (out of print), 34, 39, 67, 69, 73. England, Norfolk.

- No.6, 1977: The Anglo-Saxon Cemetery at Spong Hill, North Elmham, Part I: Catalogue of Cremations, by Catherine Hills
- No.11, 1980: The Anglo-Saxon Cemetery at Spong Hill, North Elmham, Part II: Catalogue of Cremations, by Catherine Hills and Kenneth Penn
- No.21, 1984: The Anglo-Saxon Cemetery at Spong Hill, North Elmham, Part III: Catalogue of Inhumations, by Catherine Hills, Kenneth Penn and Robert Rickett
- No.34, 1987: The Anglo-Saxon Cemetery at Spong Hill, North Elmham, Part IV: Catalogue of Cremations, by Catherine Hills, Kenneth Penn and Robert Rickett
- No.67, 1994: The Anglo-Saxon Cemetery at Spong Hill, North Elmham, Part V: Catalogue of Cremations, by Catherine Hills, Kenneth Penn and Robert Rickett
- No.39, 1988: The Anglo-Saxon Cemetery at Spong Hill, North Elmham, Part VI: Occupation during the Seventh to Second Millennia BC, by Frances Healy

- Murphy P. 1988. Botanical evidence. 103 and fiche. In: Healey F. The Anglo-Saxon cemetery at Spong Hill, North Elmham. Part VI. Occupation during the 2nd millennia BC.
- Murphy P. 1988. Plant impressions on pottery. 103. In: Healey F. The Anglo-Saxon cemetery at Spong Hill, North Elmham. Part VI. Occupation during the 2nd millennia BC. East Anglian Archaeol. 39. England, Norfolk

- No.73, 1995: The Anglo-Saxon Cemetery at Spong Hill, North Elmham, Part VII: Iron Age, Roman and Early Saxon Settlement, by Robert Rickett
- No.69, 1994: The Anglo-Saxon Cemetery at Spong Hill, North Elmham, Part VIII: The Cremations, by Jacqueline McKinley
