= North Elmham =

Village and civil parish in Norfolk, England

Coordinates: 52.748°N 0.939°E

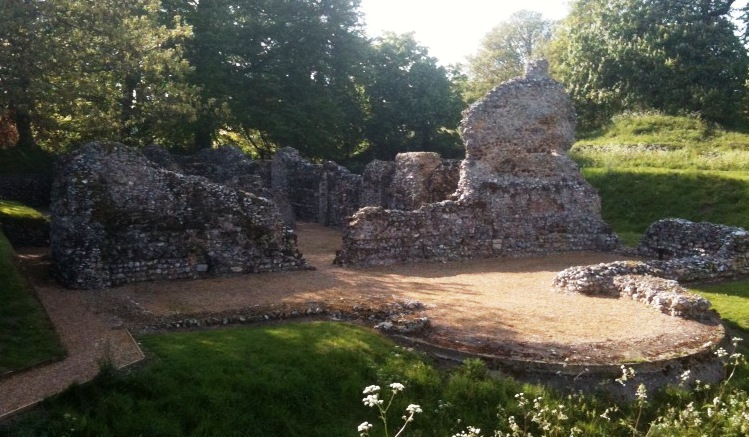
- Remains on the site of a Saxon cathedral

- Location within Norfolk
- Area: 19.20 km^{2} (7.41 sq mi)
- Population: 1,433 (2011)
  - Density: 75/km^{2} (190/sq mi)
- OS grid reference: TF985208
- Civil parish: North Elmham
- District: Breckland
- Shire county: Norfolk
- Region: East
- Country: England
- Sovereign state: United Kingdom
- Post town: DEREHAM
- Postcode district: NR20
- Dialling code: 01362
- Police: Norfolk
- Fire: Norfolk
- Ambulance: East of England
- UK Parliament: Mid Norfolk

North Elmham is a village and civil parish in the English county of Norfolk. It covers an area of 7.41 sq mi (19.2 km^{2}) and is located about 5 mi (8.0 km) north of East Dereham, on the west bank of the River Wensum. Including Gateley and Broom Green, the civil parish had a population of 1,428 in 624 households at the 2001 census; this increased slightly to 1,433 at the 2011 census.

North Elmham was the site of a pre-Norman cathedral, seat of the Bishop of Elmham until 1075. For the purposes of local government, it lies within the Elmham and Mattishall division of Norfolk County Council and the Upper Wensum ward of Breckland District Council. The village is located along the B1145, a route which runs between King's Lynn and Mundesley.

== History ==
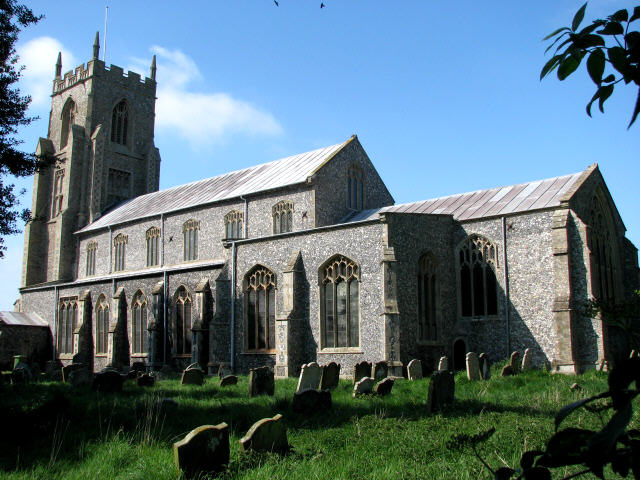
St Mary's church, North Elmham

The name North Elmham comes from the Old English, meaning "village where elms grow" and is first mentioned in 1035. Only ruins now survive of a Norman chapel which is in the care of English Heritage. The chapel is on the site of an earlier Anglo Saxon timber cathedral which housed the episcopal throne of the bishops of Elmham from around 672 until the episcopal see was moved to Thetford in 1071. A mid 9th-century copper-alloy hanging censer was discovered at North Elmham in 1786. The earthworks and ruins at North Elmham stewarded by English Heritage are thought to be the remains of Bishop Herbert de Losinga's late 11th-century episcopal church and the late 14th-century double-moated castle built on this by Henry le Despenser, Bishop of Norwich. Henry came from a powerful family who had strong links with the House of Plantagenet and the notorious 'favourites' of King Edward II.

To the south lies Spong Hill, the home of an Anglo-Saxon cemetery, excavated in the late twentieth century, by Dr Catherine Hills.

To the north of the village was the Norfolk County School which, on closing in the 1890s, was taken over for the Watts Naval School; the buildings have now been demolished. This was the birthplace of the actor John Mills.

County School railway station served the school and today is preserved by the Mid-Norfolk Railway as a small visitor centre. North Elmham railway station once served the village on the line from Wymondham to Fakenham East. The building still exists but is now a residential home, although the railway line remains and is under restoration to use. A section of the line, between North Elmham and County School station, includes a permissive footpath.

North Elmham Mill, known locally as Grint Mill, had two breastshot waterwheels until the early 20th century when they were replaced by two turbines. By the 1970s the milling machinery was driven by mains electricity while the turbines were used to drive a sack hoist and two mixing machines. The mill continued to produce animal feed into the late 20th century.

== Notable people ==
- John Mills, actor, was born in the village.
- George Englebright, cricketer

== See also ==
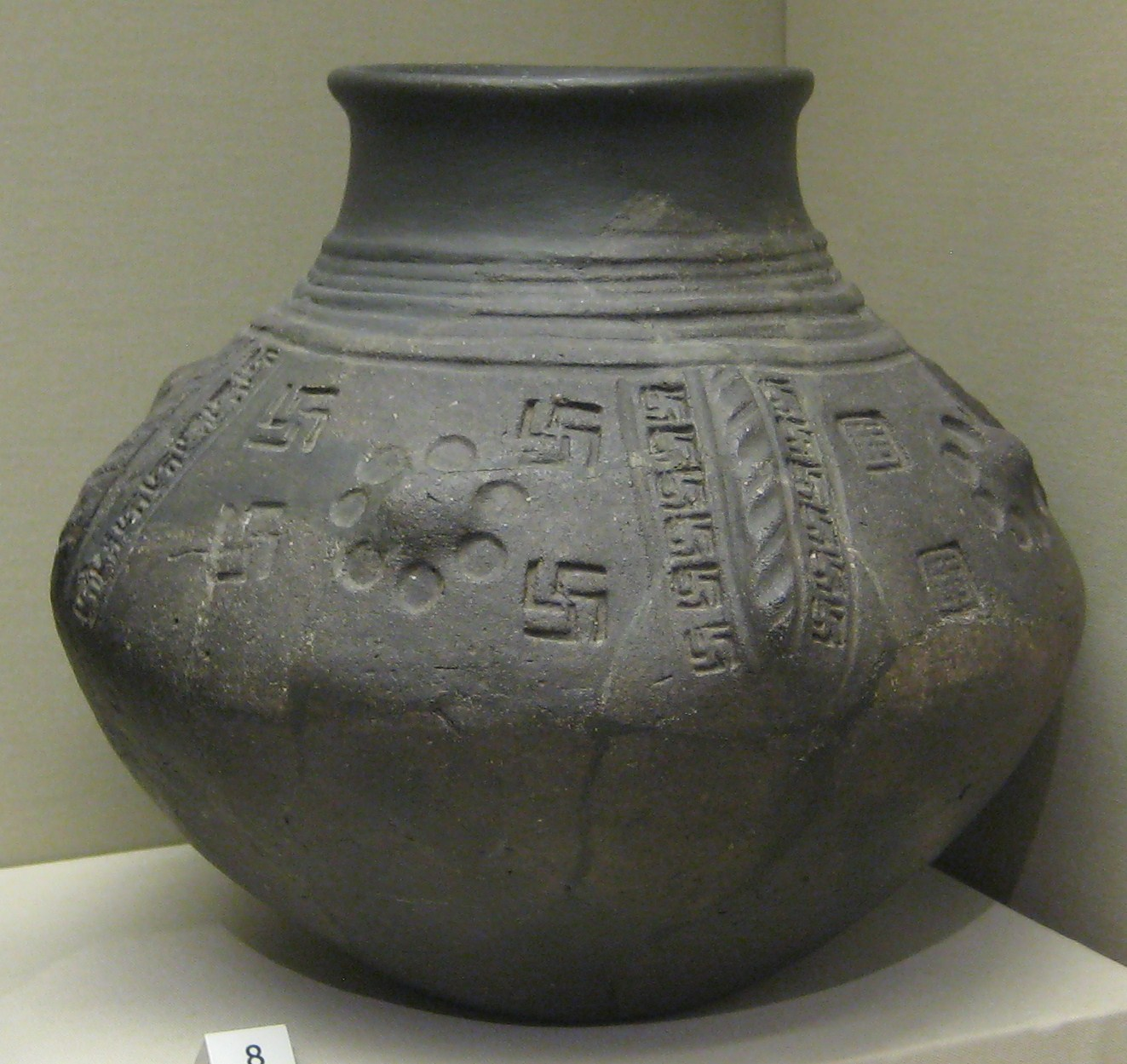
Anglo-Saxon cinerary urn with swastika motifs from North Elmham, 5th or 6th century, British Museum

- South Elmham in Suffolk
- Spong Hill archaeological site
