= Wat (disambiguation) =

A wat is a monastery temple in Cambodia, Thailand or Laos.

Wat or WAT may also refer to:

== People ==
- Wat (surname)
- Wat (given name), a list of people with the given name or nickname

== Places ==
- List of wats in Thailand
- WAT, the IATA code for Waterford Airport in Ireland
- WAT, National Rail code for London Waterloo station in London, UK

== Media and entertainment ==
- WaT, former Japanese pop duo
- WAT (album), by Slovenian industrial/techno music group Laibach
- Without a Trace, an American television show
- Woordeboek van die Afrikaanse Taal, the largest descriptive Afrikaans dictionary

== Organizations ==
- Wendover Arm Trust, a charitable body with the aim of restoring the Wendover Arm Canal, England
- Williamsburg Area Transport, former name of Williamsburg Area Transit Authority
- Wojskowa Akademia Techniczna (Military University of Technology), Warsaw, Poland
- World Association Training, a Girl Scouts program for refugee girls after World War II
- IAAF World Athletics Tour, a series of international track and field meets

== Other uses ==
- Wat (food), an Eritrean and Ethiopian stew
- Watsonia railway station, Melbourne
- West Africa Time, a time zone used in western and west-central Africa
- White adipose tissue, fatty tissue used for energy storage
- Windows Activation Technologies, an anti-piracy feature in Windows 7
- .wat, a filename extension for the WebAssembly text format
- Watzke–Allen test, a diagnostic test used in ophthalmology
- wat, Internet slang for "what"

== See also ==
- Waat
- WUT (disambiguation)
- WATS (disambiguation)
- Watt (disambiguation)
- Watts (disambiguation)
- Wot (disambiguation)
- What (disambiguation)
