= Ryburgh =

Civil parish in Norfolk, England

Coordinates: 52.81°N 0.91°E

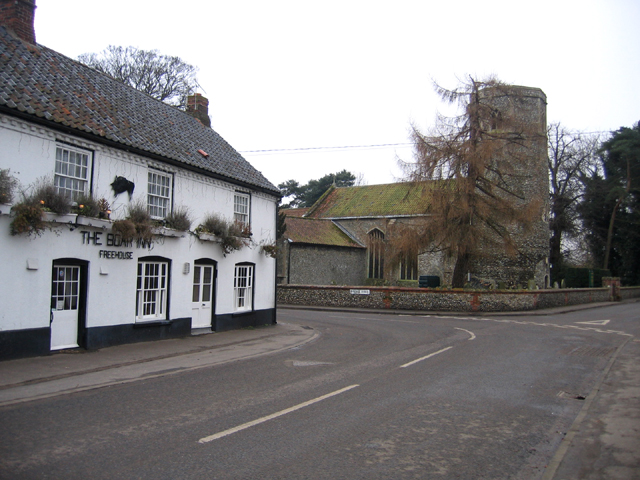
- Great Ryburgh

- Location within Norfolk
- Area: 10.04 km^{2} (3.88 sq mi)
- Population: 694 (2011 census)
  - Density: 69/km^{2} (180/sq mi)
- OS grid reference: TF953274
  - London: 117 miles (188 km)
- Civil parish: Ryburgh
- District: North Norfolk
- Shire county: Norfolk
- Region: East
- Country: England
- Sovereign state: United Kingdom
- Post town: Fakenham
- Postcode district: NR21
- Dialling code: 01328
- Police: Norfolk
- Fire: Norfolk
- Ambulance: East of England
- UK Parliament: North Norfolk

Ryburgh is a civil parish in the English county of Norfolk. The parish is 21.2 miles (34.1 km) south-west of Cromer, 23.1 miles (37.2 km) north-west of Norwich and 117 miles (188 km) north-east of London. The parish lies 4 miles (6.4 km) south-east of the nearby town of Fakenham. The nearest railway station is at Sheringham for the Bittern Line which runs between Sheringham, Cromer and Norwich. The nearest airport is Norwich International Airport. The parish includes the villages of Great Ryburgh and Little Ryburgh.

It covers an area of 10.04 km^{2} (3.88 sq mi) and had a population of 668 in 264 households at the 2001 census, the population increasing to 694 at the 2011 Census. For the purposes of local government, it falls within the district of North Norfolk.

The parish has two main religious buildings: St. Andrew's a Church of England round-tower church and a small Methodist chapel. In addition to these there is St. Clare's chapel a small Roman Catholic shrine within the grounds of the Old Rectory.

It is located about two miles south-east of the market town of Fakenham. The River Wensum flows through the parish. The parish has a large maltings which has been producing malt on a traditional malting floor for two centuries.[1] The parish and maltings were formerly served by Ryburgh station on the Great Eastern Railway branch from Wymondham and East Dereham to Fakenham and Wells-next-the-Sea. This line is proposed for restoration, as far as Fakenham, by the Mid-Norfolk Railway.

The church of Great Ryburgh St. Andrew is one of 124 existing round-tower churches in Norfolk. The church houses a complete set of 1890 Taylor bells. Practice nights are Tuesday and Thursday.

The Boar Inn is located in Great Ryburgh and is a traditional English country inn, with low-beamed ceilings and an inglenook fireplace in the bar.

== History ==
The parish was formed on 1 April 1987 from the parishes of "Great Ryburgh" and "Little Ryburgh".

== Governance ==
Ryburgh is a civil parish within the district of North Norfolk. Local matters are administered by Ryburgh Parish Council, which represents both Great Ryburgh and Little Ryburgh. The council is responsible for managing local assets, including public spaces and noticeboards, providing input on planning applications, and representing the interests of the community to district and county authorities.

Ryburgh forms part of the area served by North Norfolk District Council and Norfolk County Council. Nationally, it is situated within the North Norfolk parliamentary constituency.
