= Wymondham to Wells Branch =

Railway in Norfolk, England

Coordinates: 52.6173°N 1.0134°E

The Wymondham to Wells Branch was a railway built in stages by the Norfolk Railway, Eastern Counties Railway and Wells and Fakenham Railway between 1847 and 1857. The railway ran from Wymondham in the south, through Dereham and Fakenham to the coastal town of Wells-next-the-Sea; more specifically, the line ran from Wymondham South Junction, where it met the present-day Breckland Line. Passenger services along the line lasted until 1969; the railway continued to be used for freight until 1989. The southern section of the railway now forms the Mid-Norfolk Railway, with part of the northern section serving as the narrow gauge Wells and Walsingham Light Railway.

== History ==
=== Construction and development ===
The Lynn and Dereham Railway – by the Lynn and Dereham Railway Act 1845 (8 & 9 Vict. c. cxxvi) – and the Norfolk Railway both obtained Parliament's permission to build lines to Dereham in 1845, at the height of the so-called "Railway Mania", when railways were being built across the whole country. The Norfolk Railway, building its line from Wymondham, reached Dereham first, and opened its railway to passengers on 15 February 1847; the line from King's Lynn had to wait until 11 September 1848.

The King's Lynn line was originally operated by the Lynn and Dereham Railway, but in 1848 the Eastern Counties Railway leased the Norfolk Railway and both lines were absorbed. In 1857 the line between Dereham and Wells opened. The entire line became part of the Great Eastern Railway in 1862. The line between Wymondham and Dereham was provided with double track in 1882, the line north of there remaining single track. The intermediate stations were rebuilt as part of the 1882 doubling scheme, being provided with new up platforms and additional glass-fronted buildings and canopies on the original down platforms.

At Dereham, many trains reversed and headed west to Swaffham and King's Lynn. An avoiding double track line was built to the south of Dereham station, running between Dereham West and Dereham South signal boxes, in 1886. This allowed the Wymondham to King's Lynn line to operate as a cross-country route, with the avoiding line being used by freight, excursion and diverted main-line trains. A further branch, to Wroxham, left the line at County School station, while a branch from Heacham joined at Wells.

One of the very few railway tunnels in East Anglia was located on the northern section of line at Barsham, but the tunnel was opened out into a cutting around 1912. Its remains may be seen today, and are accessible to walkers.

An accident took place at Wells station on 29 May 1879, when the 7:50 pm train from Norwich ran away on the steep gradient approaching the terminus, smashed through the buffers at the end of the line and entered the station building through the porter's room and toilets. No passengers were injured, but a young man named George Cooke was killed in the station toilets.

Another occurred at Dereham on 18 January 1896, when the driver of engine 204, a GER Class T26 failed to notice that his train had been split into two sections before attempting to set back into sidings. The locomotive was slightly damaged, with its tender holed, a private-owner wagon belonging to Jas. Wood and Company was badly damaged a Midland Scotch Joint Stock dining car, along with a MSJS composite coach and two Glasgow and South Western Railway composite coaches.

On 20 January 1915, at the County School junction with the line to Aylsham and Wroxham, there was an accident between a passenger train from Wells and a goods train from Foulsham. At 11.46 am, Y14 '629', hauling 12 empty and 4 loaded wagons, ran into the 6 coach passenger train, hauled by T26 locomotive '446' and consisting of 6-wheel stock on the scissor crossing close to the signal box. Nobody was injured in the crash, which took place at low speed, although both locomotives were damaged, along with other vehicles in both trains.

The responsibility for the crash was placed on the driver of the goods train, for failing to observe that his signals were at danger.

GER T26 '446' survived the accident to become LNER '7446', eventually being withdrawn in April 1927. GER Y14 '629' also survived, joining the LNER as '7629' and being withdrawn in September 1926. A buffer believed to be from the tender of 629 (as this was the only vehicle listed as having such damage in the accident report) is displayed at the station, after being discovered buried in a bank at the accident site.

On 14 March 1918 the horse pulling the North Elmham milk float bolted, jumped the level crossing gate at County School station and set off along the railway towards the village. A down train was approaching the station, but managed to stop close to the southern signal box before it was struck by the oncoming milk float, with the horse continuing towards Elmham.

=== Grouping – the London and North Eastern Railway ===
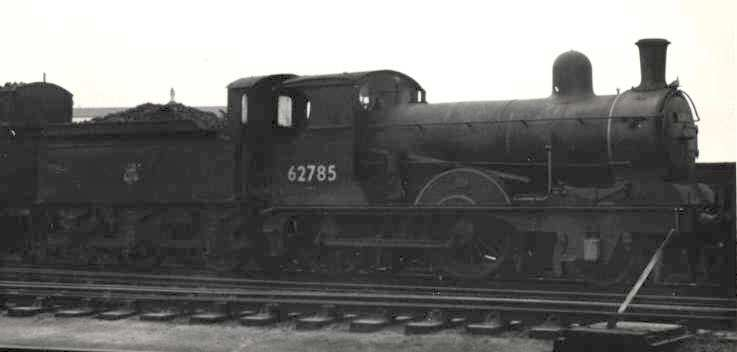
A GER Class T26, a type often used on passenger trains to Wells before the Grouping, after which most such trains were operated by Claud Hamilton 4-4-0s.

As part of the Great Eastern Railway, the branch became part of the Southern Area of the London and North Eastern Railway at The Grouping in 1923. At this time the coaches used on the Dereham line were still ex-GER 6 wheelers, although these were gradually replaced with bogie stock. Arguably the most evident change was that the GER royal blue locomotives and crimson coaches were replaced by LNER black locomotives and brown carriages.

On 27 May 1931, the 9.06 am. passenger train from Wells-on-Sea to Norwich, being worked by Class E4 7486 and which was standing at the bay platform at Fakenham Station, was hit head-on by the 8.17 a.m. passenger Norwich to Wells-on-Sea passenger train, being worked by Class E4 7457. One passenger on the stationary train was killed, with twelve passengers and three railway employees injured.

The line was heavily used during World War I and World War II, with extra Air Ministry sidings provided at Dereham in 1943. In the early days of the war, Dereham was used as a reception centre for the construction materials used to build the local airfields. In early 1944 Dereham was handling an average of 75 wagon loads of construction material per day. The line was also defended by an armoured train, reporting as Train G, based at Heacham and using F4 2-4-2 tank locomotive 7189 as motive power. The armoured train was frequently used on the Wells line, and once collided with some empty coaches at Wells.

=== Nationalisation – British Railways ===
Following the war, the railways were in a very run-down state. The Transport Act 1947 nationalised the "Big Four" railway companies, and the branch line became part of the Eastern Region of British Railways on 1 January 1948. The branch line between County School and Wroxham closed to passengers on 15 September 1952, with the section between Foulsham and Reepham closing to goods as well. The eastern section of line, between Wroxham and the Themelthorpe Curve, remained open for goods traffic until 1981. A stub of the western section, between County School and Foulsham remained open for goods until 31 October 1964, being busiest in the sugar beet season.

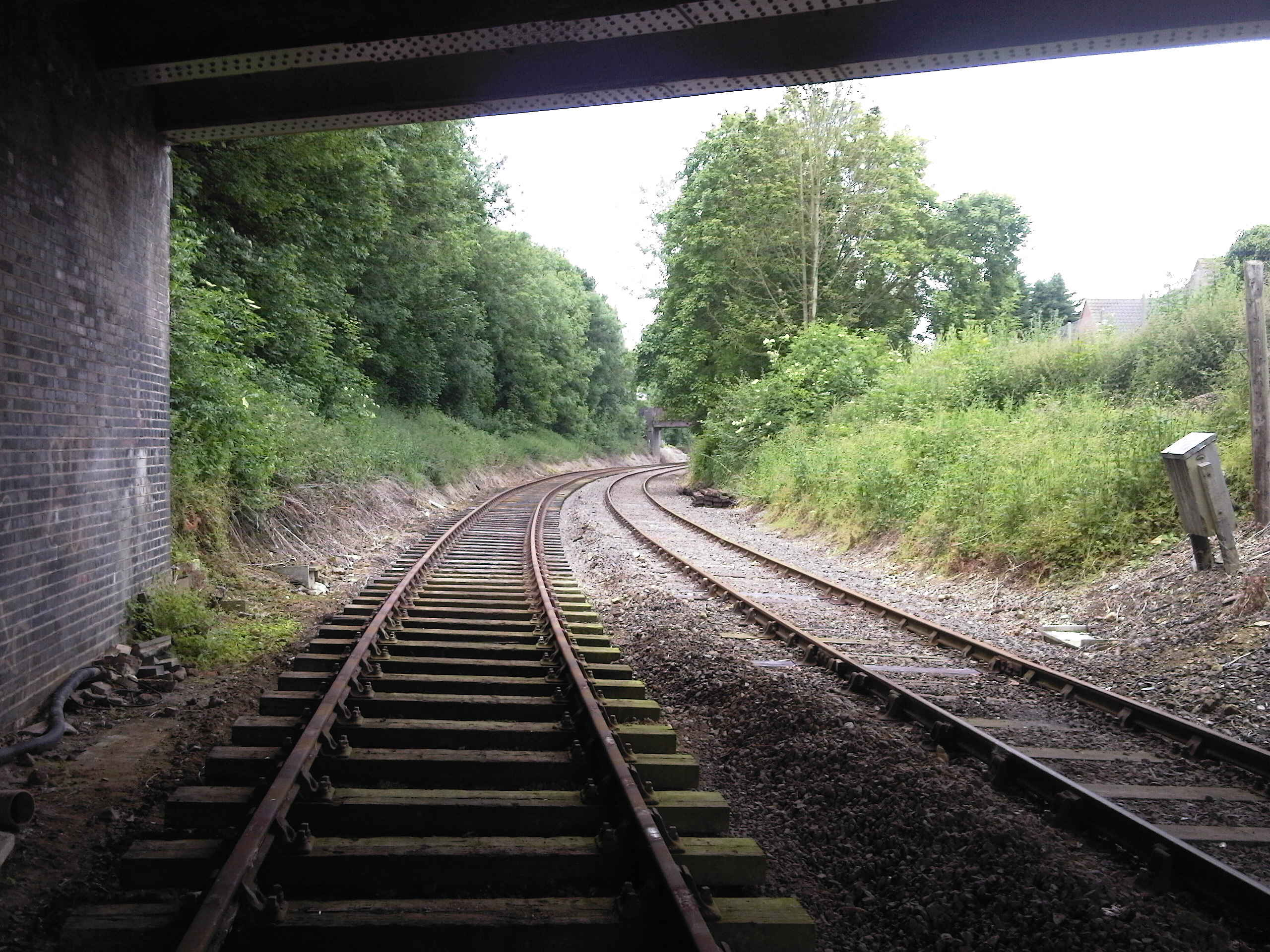
Visual effect of original double track restored near Wymondham Abbey.

The 1955 Modernisation Plan resulted in the line's last steam passenger services. The final regular steam journey ran on 17 September 1955. Diesel units took over next day, with faster trains and a more frequent service. For the first few weeks, some extra Saturday services continued to be steam-operated. Steam-hauled freight continued into the early 1960s. The final steam-hauled passenger train to Dereham was an RCTS railtour hauled by LNER Class J17 no 65567 in March 1962.

By 1960 there was an hourly passenger service to Norwich taking between 32 and 40 minutes. Despite this, increased use of road transport led to a decline in passengers, causing the service to become one of many threatened by the "Beeching Report" in 1963. Beeching intended to retain the King's Lynn – Dereham – Norwich line for express trains and freight: the local stations (that is all but Dereham and Swaffham) however, were recommended for closure.

=== Decline and closure ===
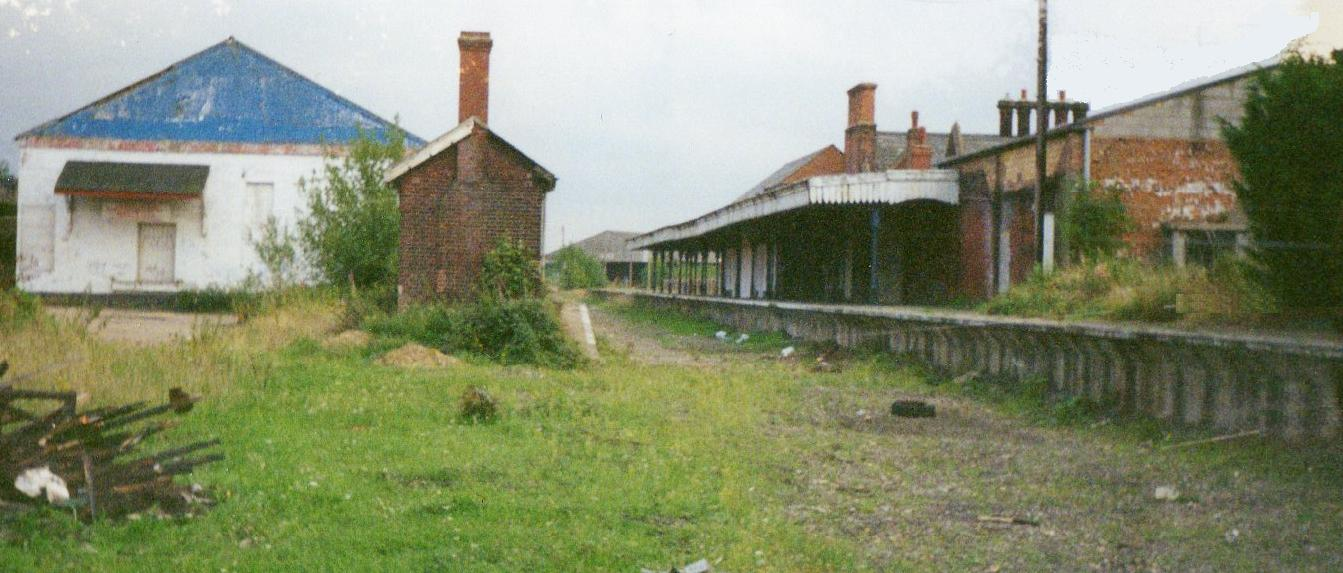
Derelict remains of Dereham station in 1990.

The passenger service between Dereham and Wells ended on 5 October 1964. Dereham became an intermediate station for Norwich and King's Lynn services. In June 1965, the Wymondham to Dereham section was reduced to single track with a passing loop at Hardingham. The passenger service from King's Lynn ended on 9 September 1968, with the Midland & Great Northern Joint Railway Society operating the 'East Anglian Branch Line Farewell' DMU special on the final Saturday. The withdrawal of the remaining passenger services, between Wymondham and Dereham, followed in October 1969.

Goods traffic continued after the passenger closure, with public delivery sidings remaining at Dereham and Fakenham and private sidings at North Elmham and Great Ryburgh. Traffic to Fakenham consisted mostly of coal deliveries, with the section of line between Ryburgh and Fakenham closing on 1 January 1980. The last freight train worked from Ryburgh in August 1981. Dereham locomotive depot was demolished in 1969, and the site used for the construction of a rail served fertiliser depot. Until 1979 a second fertiliser company unloaded their goods in Dereham at the former cattle dock north of Norwich Road level crossing. Until 1981, when the site of the sidings was claimed for a road-building scheme, coal traffic was being handled at Dereham in a yard accessed from the remains of the King's Lynn branch.

=== The route today ===
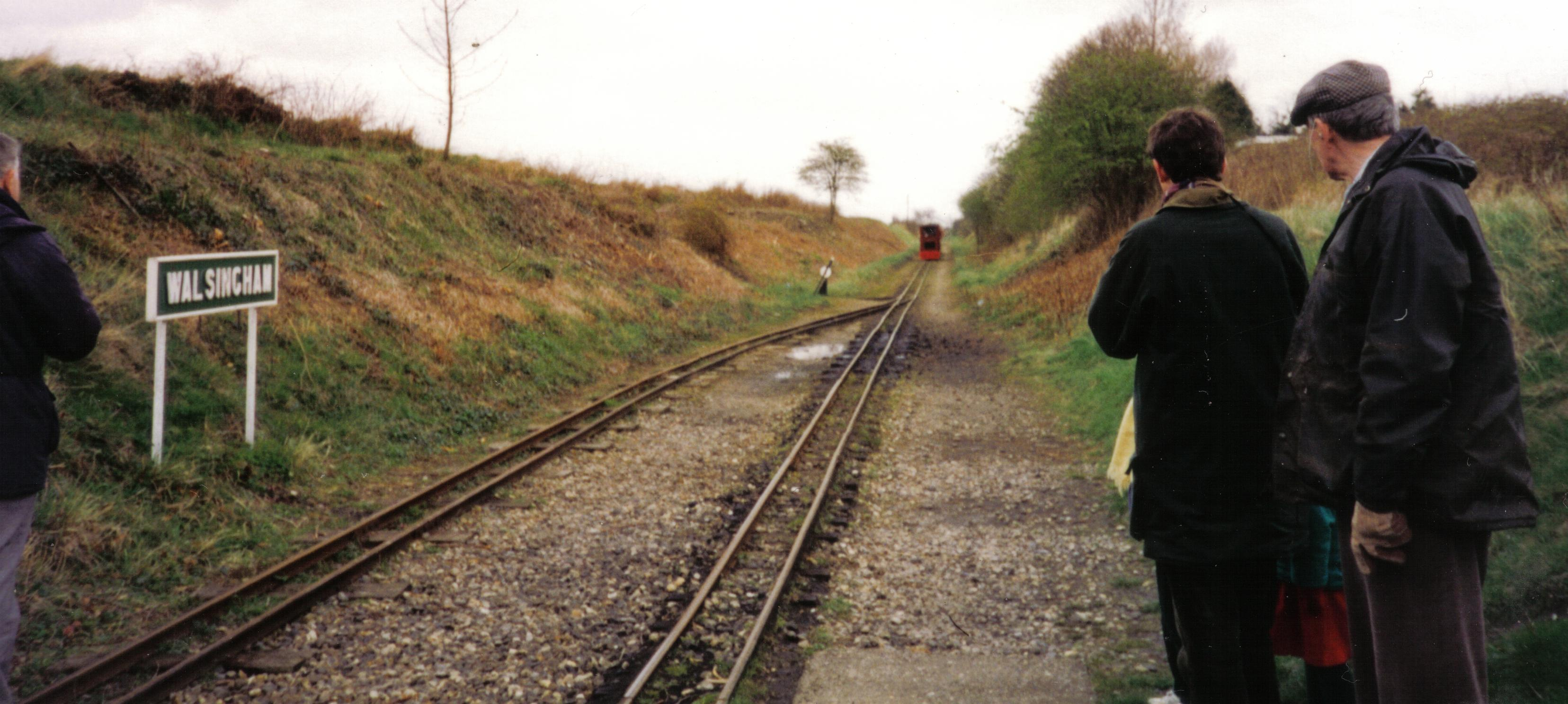
Looking towards Wells, 1990s

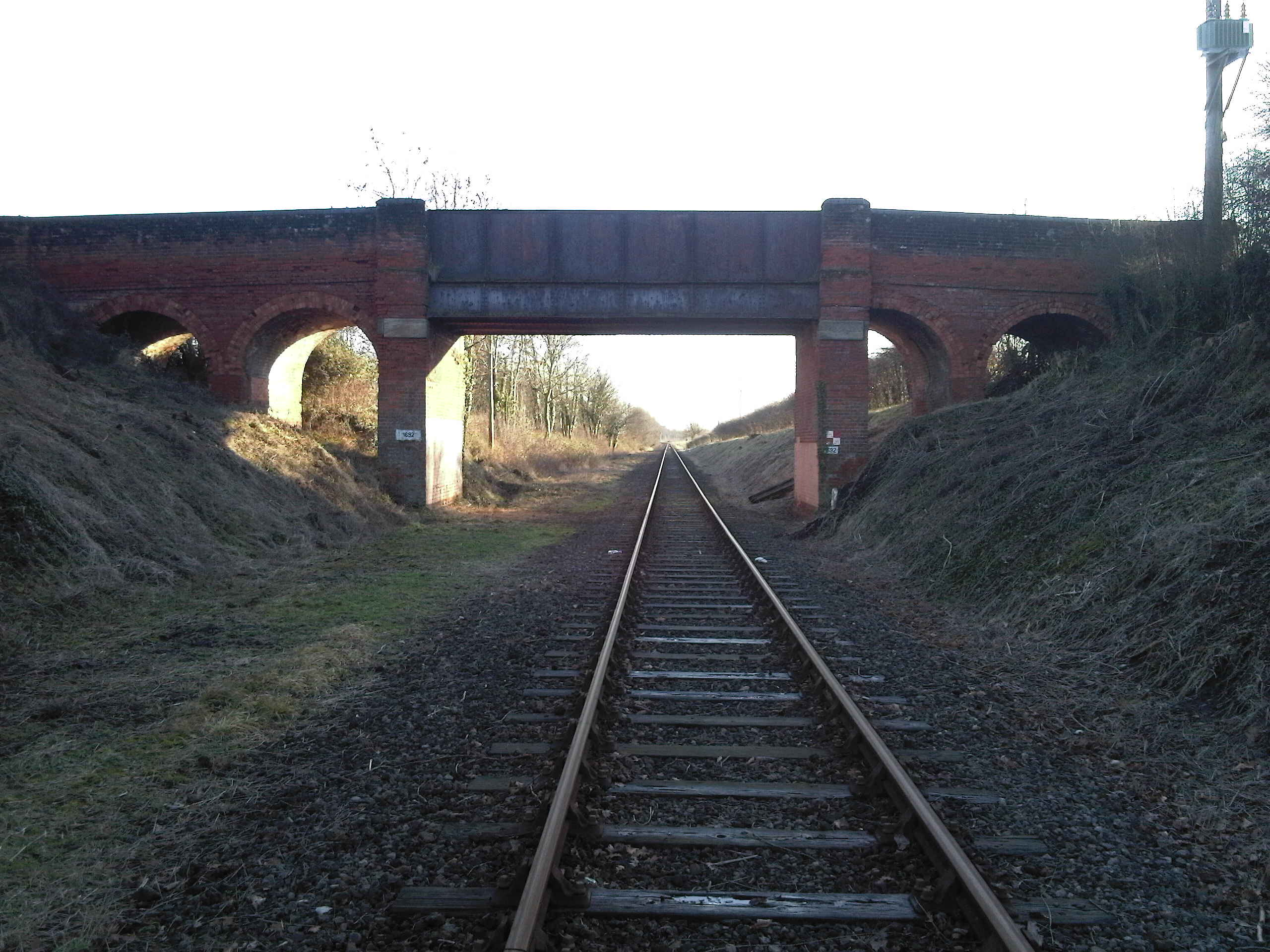
Bridge 1692, partially rebuilt for double track, showing 1965 to present day singled Mid-Norfolk Railway line.

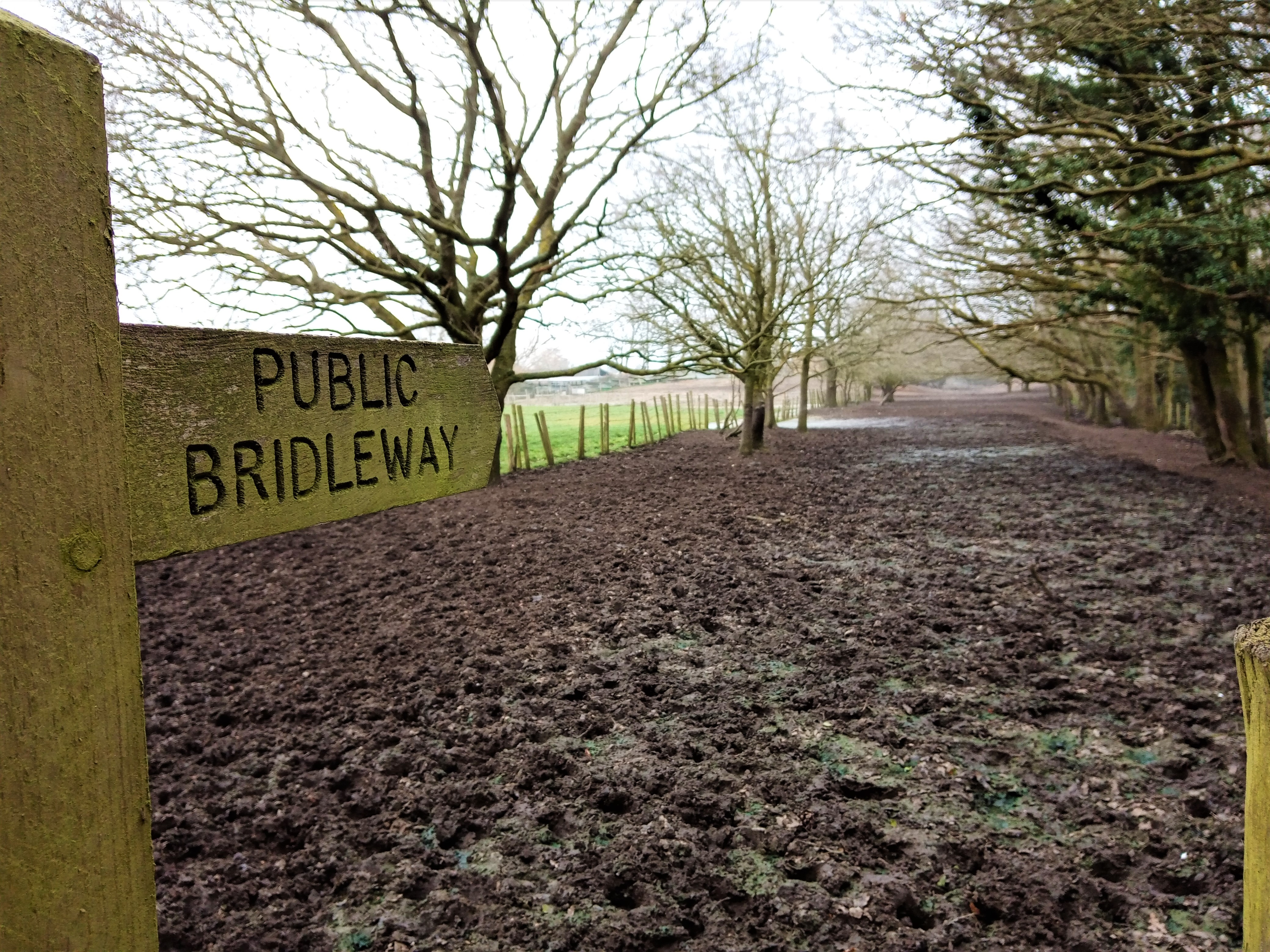
A section of the railway close to North Elmham has been designated as a Public Bridleway – albeit one that is basically impassable for much of the year due to agricultural use. The width of the formation is evident in the photo, with the left hand side being the former line to Fakenham and Wells, and the right hand side being the former branch line to Aylsham and Wronxham.

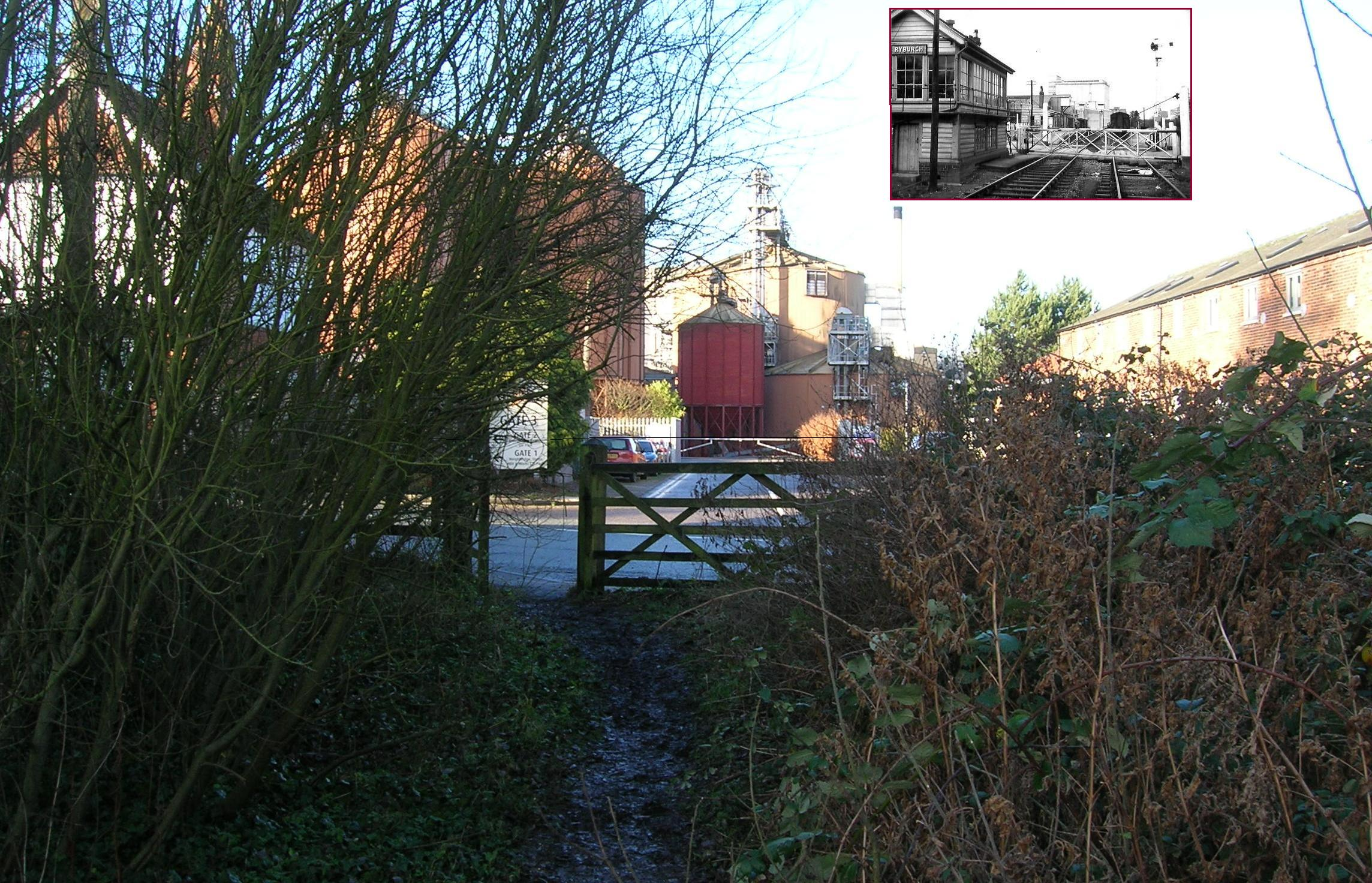
Derelict remains of Ryburgh station in 2014.

In 2010 the original station building at Wells was a second-hand bookshop and pottery, with the site of the platforms used as an industrial estate known as Great Eastern Way. The old corn mill was used as a furniture warehouse, before being converted into flats. Part of the ground floor is occupied by Wells Antiques Centre and Glaven Veterinary Centre.

Five railway schemes are based along the original formation. Work on rebuilding a section of the line as the narrow gauge Wells and Walsingham Light Railway between a point south of the former level crossing over the A149 Coast Road at Wells and a point just north of the original Walsingham station started in 1979. A section of the route, known locally as 'Barnard's Cutting', had been filled with refuse and had to be excavated before the track could be restored. The excavation of 3,000 tons of waste did not return the trackbed to its original level, resulting in a severe 1 in 29 gradient that had not existed when the line was originally in use. Services over this section resumed on 6 April 1982, with purpose built steam locomotive Pilgrim, an 0-6-0T engine built at North Walsham, launching the public service.

The 1 in 29 gradient created during the restoration of the route was restored to the original 1 in 60 by engineers from the National Construction Training College removing 17,000 tons of material in 1999. The original station building at Walsingham is currently (2010) home to St. Seraphim's Russian Orthodox church.

The line between Walsingham and County School railway station is derelict, although the track bed is mostly intact from County School to Fakenham, and is reserved by the local council for railway use.

A section of the line at Fakenham, from the station yard throat to the bridge over the River Wensum, has been purchased by the Norfolk Orbital Railway for eventual restoration. The section of railway near Fakenham has been made available as a permissive footpath until needed as a railway.

At Pensthorpe, the railway line runs along the rear boundary of the nature park, with a section south of Great Ryburgh open as a permissive footpath.

The 11.5 miles (18.5 km) line between Dereham and Wymondham are owned and operated by the Mid-Norfolk Railway, and this Trust also owns the further 6 miles (10 km) of disused railway to County School station near North Elmham, although there is a break of around a mile between North Elmham and County School where the track is no longer in situ. This makes the Mid-Norfolk Railway one of the longest heritage railways in the United Kingdom. At County School a section of the formation is shared by the North Norfolk Model Engineering Club's 3.5 and 5 inch line. At Yaxham station, the standard gauge line passes the Yaxham Light Railway's 2 foot gauge tracks.

In January 2019, Campaign for Better Transport released a report identifying the line was listed as Priority 2 for reopening. Priority 2 is for those lines which require further development or a change in circumstances (such as housing developments).

== Locomotive sheds ==
Dereham shed

By 1880 Dereham boasted a two road wooden locomotive shed and a 45-foot turntable believed to have dated from the late 1860s and known to have replaced an earlier structure. The depot operated as an outstation of Norwich. In 1888 three locomotives were based at the depot. In 1926 the engine shed was rebuilt in brick. Dereham depot was closed as a steam shed on 19 September 1955—when DMU stock was introduced to the line. The shed was used to stable DMU stock until 1 September 1968. The shed was later demolished, and the site used for the construction of a rail-served fertiliser depot. This has since been demolished and the site is now the Dereham Leisure Centre.

Wells shed

Wells was provided with a combined engine and goods shed, with the locomotives having use of the whole shed when not required for goods. Wells also operated as an outstation of Norwich depot, and there were up to five locomotives based there. In 1929 the original 42-foot turntable was replaced by a second-hand 45-foot version. The shed officially closed in September 1955 and has since been demolished.

== Charter trains ==
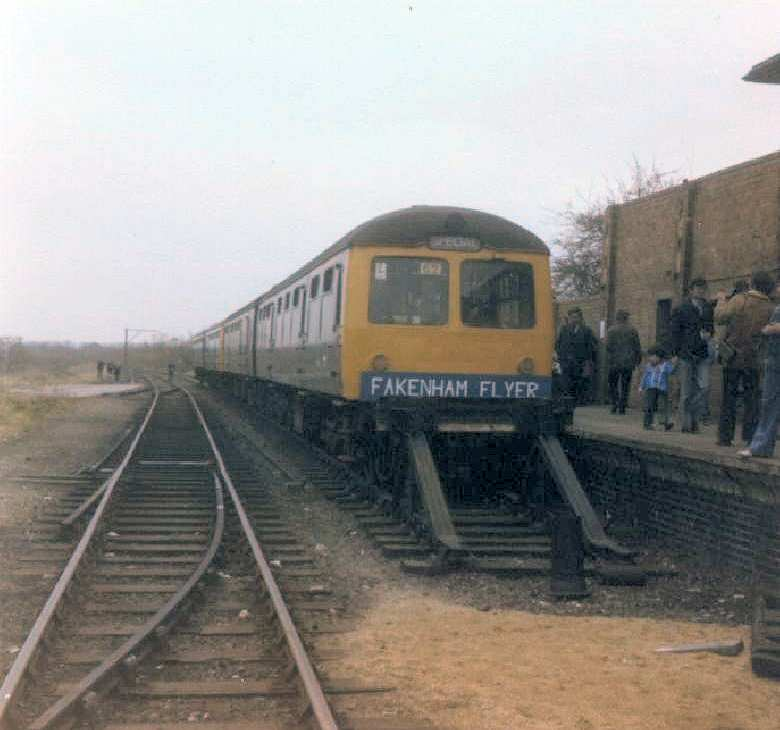
1979 charter DMU at Fakenham

Before the preservation of the line a number of special trains and demonstration services were operated over the line by the Wymondham & Dereham Rail Action Committee (WyDRAC) and the Railway Development Society (RDS) to help maintain pressure for the restoration of passenger services over the route. By the line's closure, twenty special trains and carried over 5,000 passengers. The first of these was a 6-car DMU service between Dereham and Norwich, which operated on 8 April 1978. This special carried 330 passengers from the branch and into the city, while the outward journey to Dereham carried 200 people. This included a party of ramblers, who used the service as far as Thuxton. The majority of the passengers were local.

On 21 April 1979 the RDS, WyDRAC and the newly formed Fakenham and Dereham Railway Society chartered a four-car Class 105 DMU set to operate the 'Fakenham Flyer'. This train left Norwich carrying 200 people, picking up a further 40 at Dereham, before heading to Fakenham. The DMU then operated a shuttle service to Ryburgh, County School, North Elmham and Dereham for Fakenham residents before returning to Norwich. 440 people were carried, most of them local people. This was the first passenger train at Fakenham since the line closed, and proved to be the last such train as the line was closed the following year.

A special service, using a 4-car DMU, was operated from Dereham to Lowestoft on 22 July 1979 – with tickets being sold from the former bookstall at Dereham station. 260 people boarded the train at Dereham, with 70 more joining at the intermediate stations on the route. The stock movement to Dereham also carried 22 members of a local cycle club and their bicycles. On 1 December 1979 a Christmas Shopping special operated from Dereham to Norwich, followed, on 26 April 1980, by the 'Breckland Express', formed of a Class 37 and ten coaches, which carried 570 people to London. On 27 July, the 'Broadsman' carried 250 passengers between Dereham and Sheringham.

Three trains were operated in 1981. The first, on 30 May, was a 9 coach Class 37-hauled special to York which carried 455 people. The second, operated by the Fakenham and Dereham Railway Society, was a DMU special from Ryburgh to the coastal resort of Clacton, which carried 160 people. The third event in 1981 was 'Rail Day' on 19 September. The RDS and WyDRAC chartered a Class 101 DMU for the day and operated a four-train service between Dereham and Norwich. All crossings were manned, and tickets were issued on the train by conductor guards. 600 passengers used the service, with even the 07.27 service from Norwich to Dereham carrying 5 passengers. On 15 May 1982 a Class 37 and nine coaches left Dereham bound for Matlock in the Derbyshire Dales, carrying 300 people. On 20 June the Fakenham and Dereham Railway Society chartered a DMU from Ryburgh to Norwich, where it joined a DMU special from Sheringham before continuing together to the Nene Valley Railway. 200 passengers travelled on this special. The final train of 1982 ran on 22 August, and was a Class 105 DMU carrying 170 people to Felixstowe.

In 1983 the Eastern Region of British Rail announced that they would ban all special services over freight lines. After a campaign by the RDS they agreed to allow a maximum of two excursion trains per year to use these routes. On 1 October 1983 400 people boarded a Class 31-hauled ten coach train bound for Portsmouth. Although the Class 31 broke down at Woking, the delayed service made the complete journey. In 1984, due to stock shortages and economic factors, only one special was operated, when a four-car Class 101 DMU carried 200 people between Dereham and Clacton. In 1985 a Class 101 DMU carried 100 passengers from Dereham to Cambridge. While the Dereham passengers were in the city, the DMU ran a rail tour to North Elmham, carrying 100 people from Cambridge. In 1986 a 4-car DMU carried 220 people to Cromer and Sheringham as part of the Dereham Festival and on 21 June 1987 220 people boarded another 4-car DMU bound for Lowestoft, with the train starting from Seaman's grain siding in the goods yard at North Elmham as the station platform had been sold.
