= What =

What or WHAT most often refers to:

- What, an English interrogative word
- "What?", one of the Five Ws used in journalism

What or WHAT may also refer to:

== Film and television ==
- What! (film), also known as The Whip and the Body, a 1963 Italian film directed by Mario Bava
- What? (film), 1972, directed by Roman Polanski
- "What?!", a 2019 episode of the TV series Barry
- "What", the name of the second baseman in Abbott and Costello's comedy routine "Who's on First?"
- "What?", the catchphrase of professional wrestler Stone Cold Steve Austin

== Music ==
=== Songs ===
- "What" (song), written by H. B. Barnum, first recorded by Melinda Marx, 1965; covered by Judy Street (1968) and Soft Cell (1982)
- "What?" (Rob Zombie song), 2009
- "What?" (SB19 song), 2021
- "What?", by 666 from The Soft Boys
- "What", by Bassnectar from Vava Voom
- "What?", by Corrosion of Conformity from Eye for an Eye
- "What?", by the Move from Looking On
- "What?", by A Tribe Called Quest from The Low-End Theory

=== Other uses in music ===
- what., a comedy/music album by Bo Burnham, 2013
- What? Records, a US record label

== Science and technology ==
- Web Hypertext Application Technology, a technology standard for web applications
- What.CD, a defunct private music tracker website for BitTorrent users
- WhatsApp, a cross-platform messaging and Voice over IP service owned by Facebook
- What?, a book by Indian science writer Sukanya Datta

== Other uses ==
- WHAT (AM), a radio station in Philadelphia, Pennsylvania, US
- Winter Haven Area Transit, a transit system in Florida, US

== See also ==
- Wat (disambiguation)
- Watt (disambiguation)
- WUT (disambiguation)
- Que (disambiguation)
