= Ryburgh railway station =

Former railway station in Norfolk, England

Coordinates: 52.8082°N 0.9032°E

Ryburgh
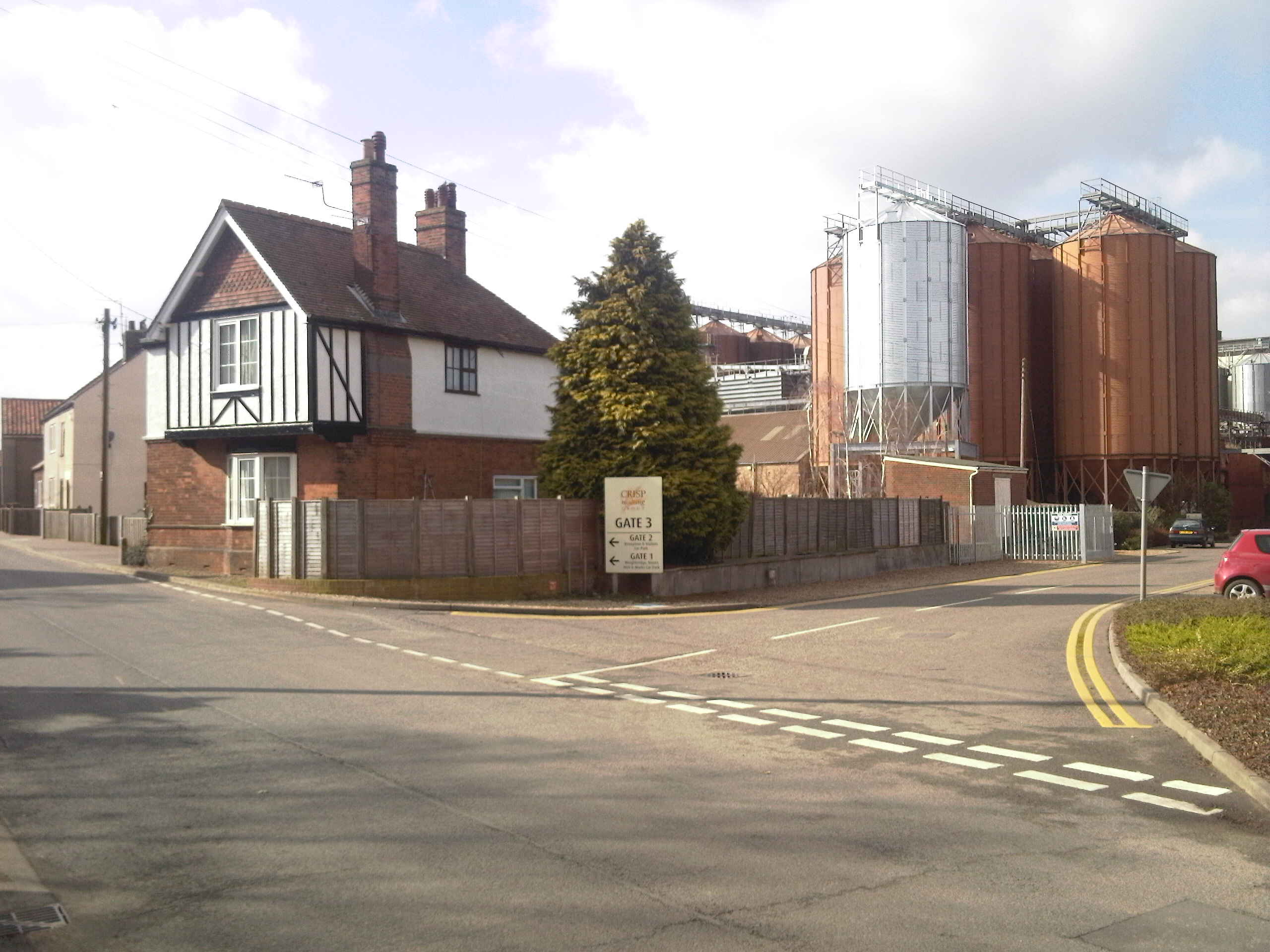

General information
- Location: Great Ryburgh, North Norfolk, Norfolk; England
- Grid reference: TF957273
- Platforms: 1

Other information
- Status: Disused

History
- Pre-grouping: Norfolk Railway; Great Eastern Railway
- Post-grouping: London & North Eastern Railway; Eastern Region of British Railways

Key dates
- 20 March 1849: Opened
- 5 October 1964: Closed to passengers
- 1 August 1981: Closed to freight
Location

Ryburgh railway station was a railway station in the village of Great Ryburgh in the English county of Norfolk.

== History ==
The station opened in 1849, when the line between Dereham and Wells opened as part of the Norfolk Railway. The entire line, between Wymondham and Wells, became part of the Great Eastern Railway in 1862.

The passenger service between Dereham and Wells ended on 5 October 1964, although the line remained open for goods trains as far as Fakenham. The closure of the station was discussed in the House of Lords on 22 June 1964, with Lord Wise asking Lord Chesham what the government intended to do to address the tonnage of grain that the closure would put onto local roads. 1978 saw the formation of the Fakenham and Dereham Railway Society, a forerunner of the Mid-Norfolk Railway, which hoped to preserve the line between these two towns.

A charter train ran as far as Fakenham in 1979, but the section of line between Ryburgh and Fakenham was closed from 1 January 1980. The last freight train left Ryburgh in August 1981, but the section remained intact for a while longer. A weedkiller train visited Ryburgh in May 1982 and the Neptune Track Recorder unit reached Ryburgh level crossing in August 1982, after which the section was officially closed and lifted.

== Future use ==
This station would be restored as part of the Norfolk Orbital Railway, which proposes seeing public service trains running from Sheringham to Wymondham via Fakenham.

== Services ==
Disused railways
Fakenham East; Line and station closed	British Rail; Eastern Region; Wymondham to Wells via East Dereham	County School; Line and station closed
	Proposed service	
Fakenham	Norfolk Orbital Railway; Mid-Norfolk Railway	County School
Preceding station	Heritage railways	Following station
Proposed extension
Terminus	Mid-Norfolk Railway	County School towards Wymondham Abbey

== See also ==
- List of closed railway stations in Norfolk
