= Fakenham East railway station =

Former railway station in Norfolk, England

Coordinates: 52.8308°N 0.8596°E

Fakenham East
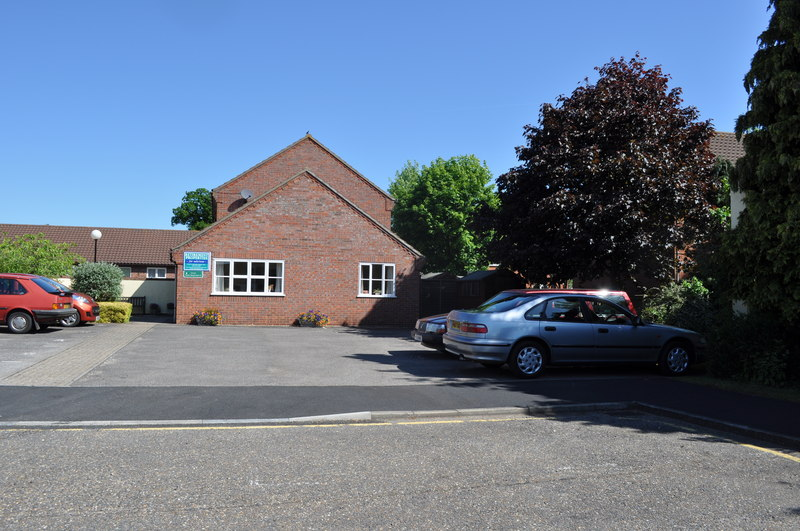
- The Site today complete with original, but relocated, crossing post to the right

General information
- Location: Fakenham, North Norfolk; England
- Grid reference: TF927297
- Platforms: 1

Other information
- Status: Disused

History
- Original company: Norfolk Railway
- Pre-grouping: Great Eastern Railway
- Post-grouping: London & North Eastern Railway; Eastern Region of British Railways

Key dates
- 20 March 1849: Opened as Fakenham
- 27 September 1948: Renamed Fakenham East
- 5 October 1964: Closed
- 1 January 1980: closed for freight traffic
Location

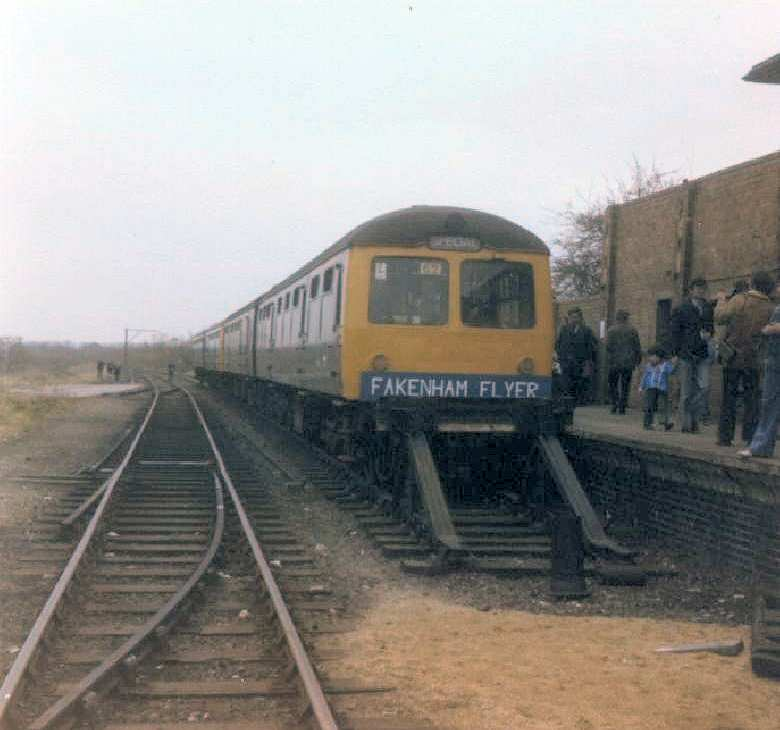
1979 charter DMU at Fakenham

Fakenham East railway station was a railway station in the market town of Fakenham in the English county of Norfolk.

The station was opened by the Norfolk Railway on 20 March 1849 and was originally named Fakenham. Following nationalisation, it was renamed Fakenham East by British Railways on 27 September 1948; it was closed to passengers on 5 October 1964 and completely in 1980.

This station is one of the possible sites protected in local plans, if needed as part of the Norfolk Orbital Railway's long-term plans to return trains to Fakenham. Any replacement station would be built on the throat of the original site, as sheltered housing has been built on the main station site. Other developments north of the former station make further extension impractical; instead the 'Norfolk Orbital' scheme proposes reopening towards the North Norfolk line at Holt and the Mid-Norfolk line at County School. The railway formation south of the station, as far as the three-arch viaduct over the River Wensum, is now owned by the Norfolk Orbital Railway.

There was also a Fakenham West railway station, on the Midland and Great Northern Joint Railway between King's Lynn and Great Yarmouth, which closed in 1959.

Preceding station	Disused railways	Following station
Walsingham; Line and station closed	Wells and Fakenham Railway	Terminus
Walsingham; Line and station closed	British Rail; Eastern Region; Wymondham to Wells via East Dereham	Ryburgh; Line and station closed

== Accident ==
On 27 May 1931, a head-on collision took place at the station. Ex-GER T26 2-4-0 No. 7486 was hauling a passenger train when it overran a signal and collided with another passenger train, hauled by fellow Ex-GER T26 2-4-0 No. 7457. In total, one person was killed and 15 others were injured.

== See also ==
- List of closed railway stations in Norfolk
