= Great Ryburgh =

Village in Norfolk, England

Coordinates: 52.8083°N 0.9012°E

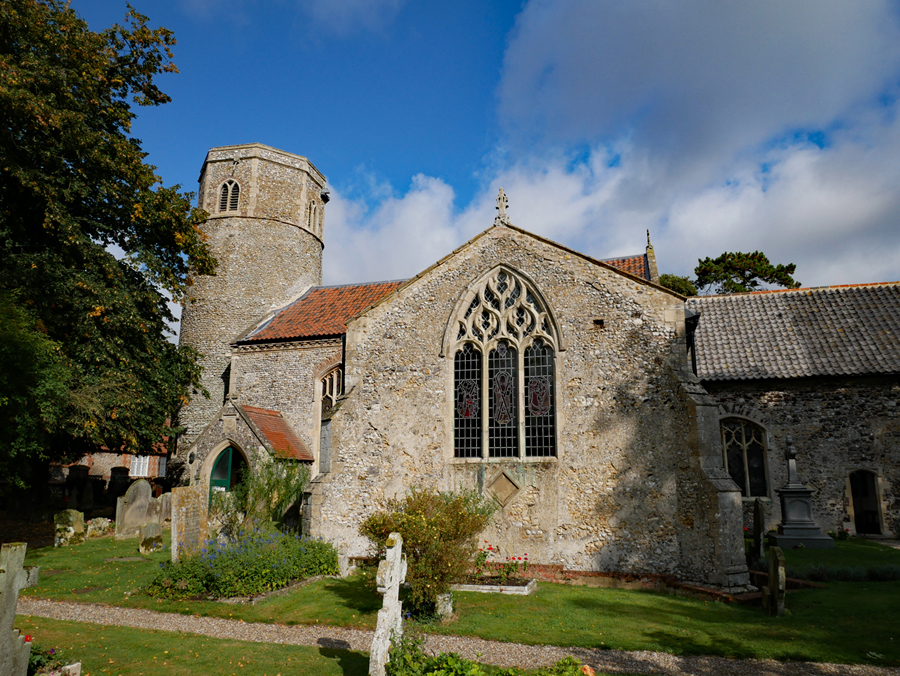
- Great Ryburgh St Andrew

- Location within Norfolk
- Civil parish: Ryburgh
- District: North Norfolk
- Shire county: Norfolk
- Region: East
- Country: England
- Sovereign state: United Kingdom
- Post town: Fakenham
- Postcode district: NR21
- UK Parliament: Broadland and Fakenham

Great Ryburgh is a village and former civil parish, now in the parish of Ryburgh, in the North Norfolk district, in the English county of Norfolk.

Great Ryburgh is located 2.9 miles (4.7 km) south-east of Fakenham and 21 miles (34 km) north-west of Norwich.

== History ==
Great Ryburgh's name is of Anglo-Saxon origin and derives from the Old English for the larger rye fortification.

An Anglo-Saxon cemetery was discovered in 2016 by a Museum of London Archaeology excavation that was largely funded by Historic England. The waterlogged conditions of the site led to the remarkable preservation of burials including 6 plank-lined graves and 81 hollowed tree-trunk coffins dating from the 7th-9th century AD. The evidence is this may have been a community of early Christians, including a timber structure thought to be a church or chapel.

In the Domesday Book, Great Ryburgh is listed as a settlement of 25 households in the hundred of Brothercross. In 1086, the village was part of the East Anglian estates of William de Warenne and Peter de Valognes.

There is evidence that there has been a watermill in Great Ryburgh since 1579 which closed in 1923. In 2003, the mill was converted into an old people's home.

In 1849, Ryburgh Railway Station opened on the line between Dereham and Wells-next-the-Sea. The station closed to passengers in 1964.

A maltings has stood in Great Ryburgh since 1870. The site was bombed twice during the Second World War.

In 1961 the parish had a population of 484. On 1 April 1987 the parish was abolished and merged with Little Ryburgh to form "Ryburgh".

In the mid-1990s, there were reports of a sighting of an unidentified flying object in the parish.

== Geography ==
Population statistics are no longer recorded for just Great Ryburgh and are instead collected just for Ryburgh as a whole.

The River Wensum flows through the village.

== St. Andrew's Church ==
Great Ryburgh's church is dedicated to Saint Andrew and is one of Norfolk's 124 remaining round-tower churches, dating from the Eleventh Century. St. Andrew's is located within the village on Mill Road and has been Grade II listed since 1959. The church is open sometimes for Sunday services and is part of the Upper Wensum Benefice.

The church was restored in the 1910s by Sir Ninian Comper and had stained-glass windows designed by William Wailes.

== Amenities ==
The Blue Boar Inn has stood in Great Ryburgh since 1789 and remains open for food and accommodation.

== Governance ==
Ryburgh is a civil parish within the district of North Norfolk. Local matters are administered by Ryburgh Parish Council, which represents both Great Ryburgh and Little Ryburgh. The council is responsible for managing local assets, including public spaces and noticeboards, providing input on planning applications, and representing the interests of the community to district and county authorities.

Great Ryburgh is part of the electoral ward of Stibbard for local elections and is part of the district of North Norfolk.

The village's national constituency is Broadland and Fakenham which has been represented by the Conservative Party's Jerome Mayhew MP since 2019.

== War Memorial ==
Great Ryburgh War Memorial is a granite pillar surrounded by a flint and brick enclosure which was funded by public donations in 1920. The memorial lists the following names for the First World War:

Rank	Name	Unit	Date of death	Burial/Commemoration
Sgt.	Charles Cremer	44th Bde., Royal Field Artillery	1 Nov. 1914	Menin Gate
Sgt.	Joseph C. Howman	21st (1st Surrey) Bn., London Regt.	8 Oct. 1916	Thiepval Memorial
C1C	George H. Bond	HMS Hampshire	5 Jun. 1916	Portsmouth Memorial
Cpl.	Percy H. Neale	1st Bn., Norfolk Regiment	23 Apr. 1917	Villers Station Cemetery
Pte.	Cecil S. Kail	31st M.A.C., Army Service Corps	1 Nov. 1918	Douai British Cemetery
Pte.	Walter F. Fenn	2nd Bn., Border Regiment	30 Mar. 1917	Arras Memorial
Pte.	Herbert A. Chastney	1st Bn., Essex Regiment	2 Mar. 1917	Thiepval Memorial
Pte.	Harold D. P. Comer	1st Bn., Essex Regt.	13 Aug. 1915	Helles Memorial
Pte.	Ernest A. Nelson	10th Bn., Essex Regt.	21 Sep. 1918	Unicorn Cemetery
Pte.	John F. Bacon	11th Bn., Essex Regt.	18 Apr. 1918	Niederzwehren Cemetery
Pte.	Albert Green	1st Bn., Norfolk Regiment	1 Aug. 1916	Thiepval Memorial
Pte.	Frederick Green	1st Bn., Norfolk Regt.	27 Jul. 1916	Thiepval Memorial
Pte.	Ernest Thompson	1st Bn., Norfolk Regt.	24 May 1915	Menin Gate
Pte.	Charles T. Steward	2nd Bn., Norfolk Regt.	28 Sep. 1917	North Gate Cemetery
Pte.	Stanley E. Curson	4th Bn., Norfolk Regt.	19 Apr. 1917	Jerusalem Memorial
Pte.	William Doy	8th Bn., Norfolk Regt.	22 Oct. 1917	Tyne Cot
Pte.	Everart B. Hipkin	8th Bn., Norfolk Regt.	2 Nov. 1916	Courcelette Memorial
Pte.	Richard R. Platten	9th Bn., Norfolk Regt.	8 Oct. 1918	High Tree Cemetery
Pte.	Frederick W. Baldwin	1st Bn., Northamptonshire Regiment	9 Sep. 1916	Thiepval Memorial
Pte.	Robert W. Baker	2nd Bn., Northamptonshire Regt.	4 Mar. 1917	Thiepval Memorial
Pte.	Frederick J. Bone	6th Bn., Queen's Royal Regiment	10 May 1917	Étaples Cemetery
Pte.	Edmund W. Betts	19th Bn., Royal Welch Fusiliers	23 Nov. 1917	Cambrai Memorial
Pte.	Harry V. Chilvers	13th Bn., Welch Regiment	27 Aug. 1918	Vis-en-Artois Memorial
Pte.	John Betts	8th Bn., York and Lancaster Regiment	12 Oct. 1917	Tyne Cot

The following names were added after the Second World War:

Rank	Name	Unit	Date of death	Burial/Commemoration
Cpl.	Terrence Tatham	2nd (Selangor) Bn., Malayan Volunteers	7 Feb. 1942	Kranji War Cemetery
LAC	Cecil R. Mattless	Royal Air Force	8 Oct. 1943	Bath Cemetery
A2C	David J. Nelson	Royal Air Force Volunteer Reserve	11 Mar. 1944	Little Ryburgh Cemetery
Pte.	Albert J. Whiteside	Royal Army Ordnance Corps	26 Apr. 1941	Phalerum Cemetery

The following name was added after the Korean War:

Rank	Name	Unit	Date of death	Burial/Commemoration
Pte.	Noel A. Haynes	Royal Norfolk Regiment	24 Jul. 1952	UN Memorial Cemetery
