= Watt (disambiguation) =

The watt is a unit of power named after Scottish engineer James Watt.

Watt or WATT may also refer to:

== People ==
- Watt (surname), a surname (including a list of people with the name)
- Watt of Sussex, Anglo-Saxon king of Sussex who ruled between about AD 692 and 725
- Watt Hobt (1893–1963), American college football and basketball coach
- Watt Sam (1876–1944), Native American/Natchez storyteller and cultural historian
- Watt W. Webb (1927–2020), American biophysicist
- Watt Key, a pen name of American fiction author Albert Watkins Key, Jr. (born 1970)

== Places ==
- Morne Watt or Watt Mountain, Dominica
- Mount Watt, Victoria Land, Antarctica
- Watt Bay, George V Land, Antarctica
- Watt (crater), a crater on the Moon

== Arts and entertainment ==
- Watt (album), an album by the English blues rock band Ten Years After
- Watt (novel), a book by Samuel Beckett

== Other uses ==
- WATT System, technology for charging electric vehicles
- Watt Library, Greenock, Scotland
- El Tari International Airport (ICAO code: WATT), East Nusa Tenggara, Indonesia
- WATT, an AM radio station in Cadillac, Michigan, US
- French submarine Watt, a French Navy submarine commissioned in 1910 and stricken in 1919

== See also ==
- Watt balance, the former name of the Kibble balance, an electromechanical device for measuring weight
- Watt & Shand, a former department store in Lancaster, Pennsylvania, US
- WAT (disambiguation)
- WATS (disambiguation)
- Watts (disambiguation)
- What (disambiguation)
- Wot (disambiguation)
