= Vat =

Vat or VAT may refer to:

== Container ==
- Barrel for alcoholic beverage or other liquid

== Economics and business ==
- Value-added tax, a consumption tax levied on value added
  - VAT identification number
  - Value Added Tax (United Kingdom)
- VAT (Ukrainian: Відкрите акціонерне товариство), a former type of legal entity in Ukraine

== Places ==
- Vatican City, ISO country code VAT
- Vát, a village in Hungary

== Other uses ==
- Vat 69, a Scotch blended whisky
- VAT 69 Commando, elite special forces of the Royal Malaysian Police
- Vanajan Autotehdas (VAT), former heavy vehicle producer in Finland
- Veterans Against Terrorism, UK political advocacy group
- Virtual Allocation Table, a component of the Universal Disk Format

== See also ==
- Vats (disambiguation)
