= Wat (given name) =

Wat is a masculine given name or nickname, often a diminutive variant of the given name Walter, and sometimes a modernized form of the name Watt, especially in Scotland, North East England and Southern England.

People named Wat include:

- Wat Tyler Cluverius Jr. (1874–1952), U.S. Navy rear admiral
- Wat T. Cluverius IV (1934–2010), American diplomat
- Wat Jones (1917–1994), Welsh cricketer
- Wat Misaka (1923–2019), American basketball player
- Walter Scott (Australian footballer) (1899–1989), Australian rules footballer
- Wat Tyler (1341–1381), leader of the English Peasants' Revolt

== See also ==
- Walter Scott of Harden (c. 1563–1629), Scottish Border Reiver, known as "Auld Wat"
