= Foulsham railway station =

Former railway station in England

Coordinates: 52.7778°N 1.0045°E

Foulsham
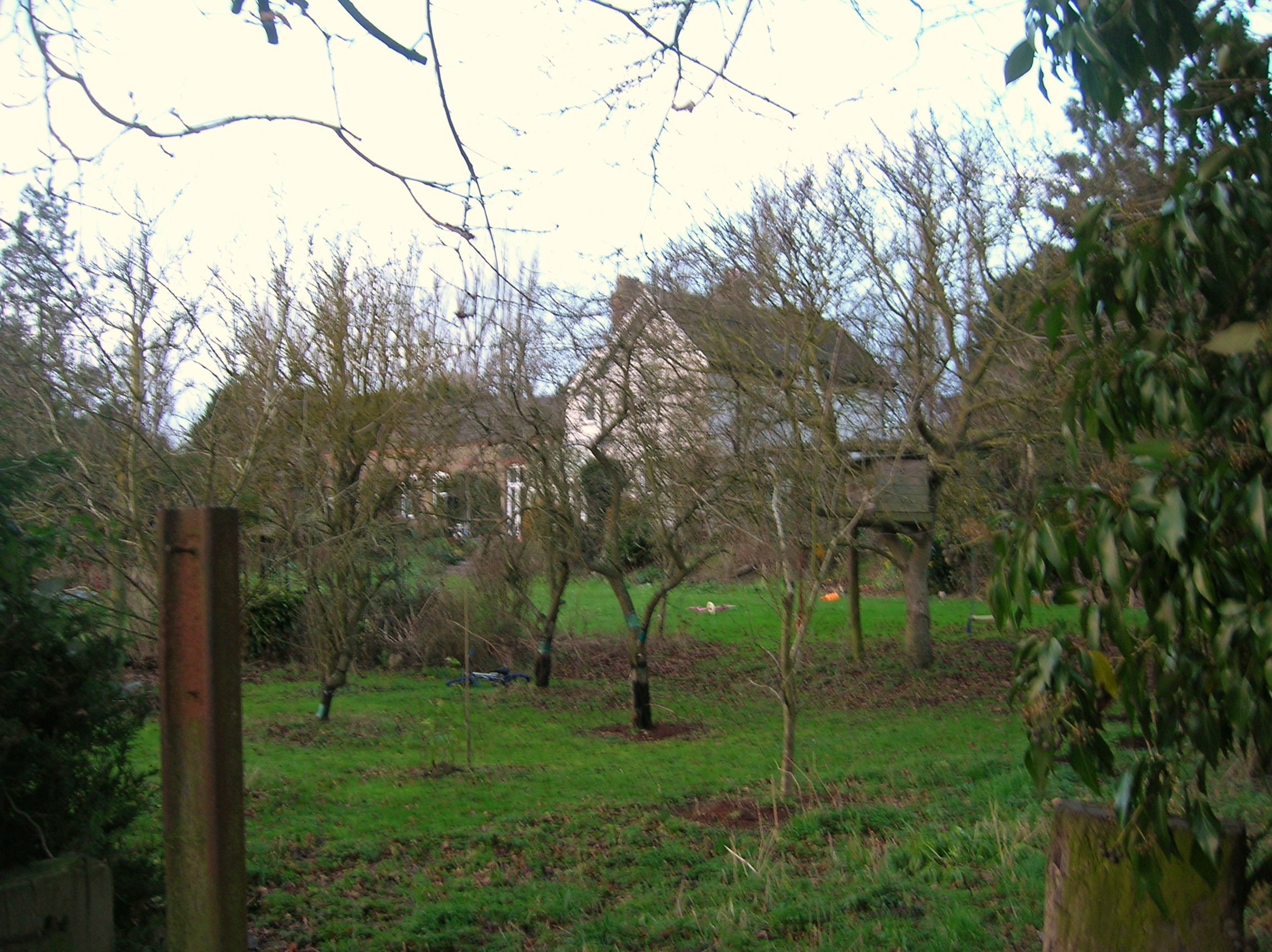
- Foulsham station, 2014

General information
- Location: Foulsham, Broadland, Norfolk; England
- Grid reference: TG027242
- Platforms: 1

Other information
- Status: Disused

History
- Pre-grouping: East Norfolk Railway; Great Eastern Railway
- Post-grouping: London & North Eastern Railway; Eastern Region of British Railways

Key dates
- 1 May 1882: Opened
- 15 September 1952: Closed to passengers
- 31 October 1964: Closed to freight
Location

Foulsham was a railway station in North Norfolk. It served the village of Foulsham, and was closed to passengers on 15 September 1952. The line from Foulsham to Reepham closed to goods at the same date. Goods traffic on the section between Foulsham and County School continued until 31 October 1964.

== Signal boxes ==
Location	Status	Built by	Notes	Photograph
Foulsham West	Demolished	Great Eastern Railway	Foulsham West cabin was the main signalbox for the site. The signal diagram suggests that it had a 15 lever frame. This box can be seen in the distance in the image.	
Foulsham East	Demolished	Great Eastern Railway	Foulsham East cabin was located on the station (west) side of the level crossing, on the south side of the running line, at the Reepham end of the station site. The signal diagram for Foulsham West suggests that it controlled the level crossing and the eastern points of the station loop.	
Foulsham	Demolished	Great Eastern Railway	The West and East 'boxes were replaced by a single structure, located close to the west end of the platform, prior to the closure of the line.	

Preceding station	Disused railways	Following station
County School; Line and station closed	Great Eastern	Reepham; Line and station closed

== See also ==
- List of closed railway stations in Norfolk
