= Reepham railway station (Norfolk) =

Disused railway station in Norfolk, England

Coordinates: 52.7684°N 1.1138°E

Reepham (Norfolk)
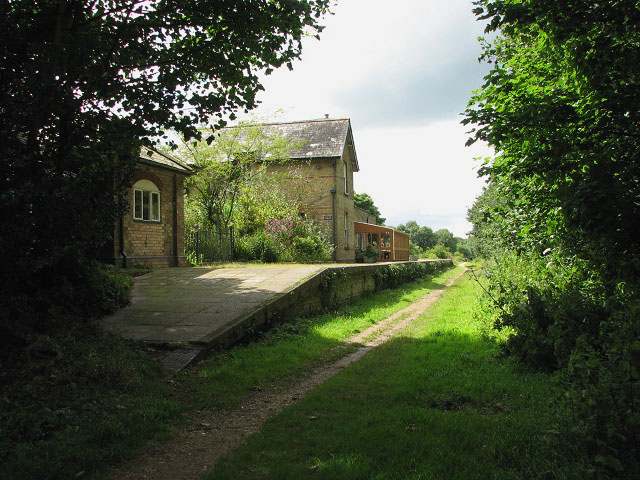
- Reepham railway station in 2008.

General information
- Location: Reepham, Broadland; England
- Grid reference: TG101235
- Platforms: 2

Other information
- Status: Disused

History
- Pre-grouping: East Norfolk Railway; Great Eastern Railway
- Post-grouping: London & North Eastern Railway; Eastern Region of British Railways

Key dates
- 1 May 1882: Opened as Reepham
- 1 November 1927: Renamed Reepham (Norfolk)
- 15 September 1952: Closed to passengers
- 13 July 1981: Closed to freight
Location

Reepham (Norfolk) was a railway station in Reepham, Norfolk. It was opened in 1882 and closed to passengers in 1952; it finally shut to goods services in 1981. The tracks through Reepham remained in place until 1985, latterly serving a concrete factory in Lenwade. The trackbed is preserved as part of the Marriott's Way long-distance footpath between Aylsham and Norwich.

| Preceding station | Disused railways | Following station |
|---|---|---|
| Foulsham; Line and station closed | Great Eastern | Cawston; Line and station closed |

== Future operations ==
A speculative plan to create a heritage railway between Reepham station and Whitwell station has been proposed by the owner of the latter station, which is being developed as a railway centre. This would include relaying the Themelthorpe Curve, built to link the former Great Eastern Railway and Midland and Great Northern Joint Railway routes; it was formerly the tightest radius curve on the British Rail network.
