= Watts Naval School =

Coordinates: 52.7647°N 0.9555°E

Watts Naval Training School
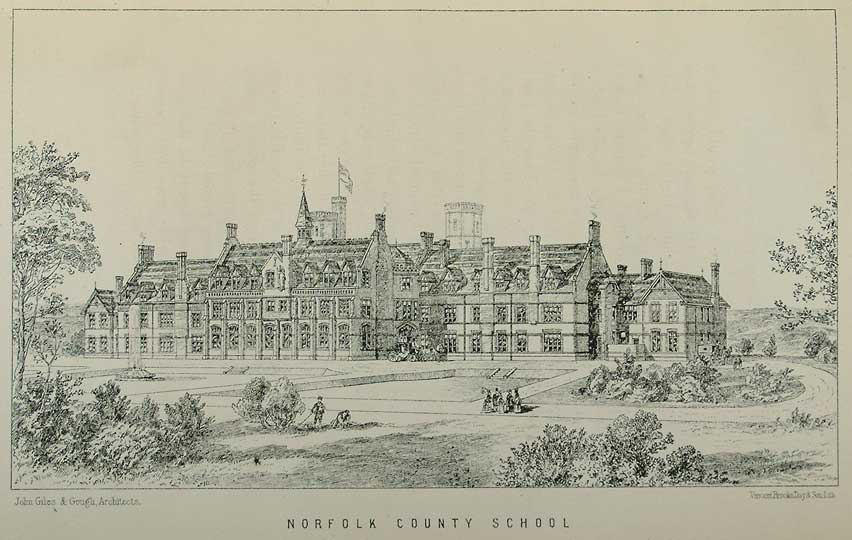
- North Elmham, Norfolk; England

Information
- Type: Boarding school
- Established: 1903
- Closed: 1953
- Gender: Boys
- Enrolment: 320
- Founder: E. H. Watts

Watts Naval School was originally the Norfolk County School, a boarding school set up to serve the educational needs of the 'sons of farmers and artisans'. The school was later operated by Dr Barnardo's until closure in 1953.

== History ==
=== Norfolk County School ===
Norfolk County School stood on the summit of a wooded hill with excellent views across the Wensum Valley near the village of North Elmham. It was surrounded by 60 acres (240,000 m^{2}) of land in Bintry parish in the Bintry (or Bintree as it is sometimes written) Hills.

Norfolk County School was a boarding school founded by Prebendary Joseph Lloyd Brereton to serve the educational needs of the sons of farmers & artisans as part of his experiment in County Education. The foundation stone was laid on Easter Monday 1873 by Edward Prince of Wales (later to become King Edward VII). The school opened in 1874. The school also had an open-air swimming pool.

The property consisted of a central building, with a principal's House attached to the north end of the building. A laundry was provided at the south end of the intersection. At the north end of the fifty-four-acre site was a gardener's cottage. The western boundary of the property was marked by the River Wensum, and an open-air 70 ft by 30 ft swimming bath was provided next to the river. A boat house owned by the school also stood on the banks of the river, and a cricket ground was provided on the eastern side of the main building.

A chapel, built of Bath stone, was erected in 1883 and consecrated on 16 October that year. In 1884 Brereton succeeded in getting railway access to the school through the County School railway station built at the foot of the hill. Despite the improved communications, the school roll never reached the 300 for which it was designed, partly as a result of the depression in agriculture.

=== Watts Naval School ===
The school was closed in July 1895. On 4 June 1901 its premises were sold to Edmund Hannay Watts. Following his death, his eldest son, Fenwick Shadforth Watts, had the fabric of the building renovated and furnished, at a cost of several thousand pounds, before handing it over to Dr Barnardo's Homes. As a result, it was turned into a home for up to 300 orphans and destitute boys under the charge of Dr T. J. Barnardo and was opened informally on 9 March 1903. The establishment was then used for the training of selected Barnardo's boys for a life at sea in the Royal Navy or mercantile Marine. The school was opened on 17 April 1906, by Viscount Coke, later Earl of Leicester. It was classified as a Secondary Technical School, with the technical instruction being nautical and with musical training for boys intending on being enlisted in the Royal Marines or other military bands.

The first captain of the school was Commander H. C. Martin, a former captain of the training ship Warspite, working with a staff of fifteen. The rector of Kettlestone was appointed as Honorary Chaplain, and medical care was provided by Dr Rackham from North Elmham. Initially only one hundred boys were sent to the school, with the remaining two hundred arriving in batches of fifty to assist with the establishment of naval discipline.

The building was only slightly altered from its former use as a public school. The central hall was fitted with a heavy glass roof, and a fire escape was added to the eastern side of the building, allowing it to be evacuated within three minutes. Every part of the school was heated with hot water and an acetylene gas supply was installed. The central hall, classrooms, reception rooms and staff rooms were on the ground floor. The first floor was used for staff bedrooms, boys' dormitories, linen and the storage of dry goods. The third floor included the dining hall, kitchens, dining rooms and more dormitories. The bathrooms, engine room (boilers) and offices were located in the basement. The school was also provided with an isolation hospital, built in the grounds.

The boys were woken at 6.30am, after which they attended morning prayers before having breakfast at 7.30am. At 9.00am they would go to the central hall and fall in for inspection by the captain, before marching off for lessons and drill. Dinner was served at 12.30pm, with the boys falling in for more school and drill at 2.00pm. At 4.00pm they had a half-hour's special drill training. Tea was served at 5.30pm, with evening prayers and bed two hours later.

The chapel was enlarged in 1926, when transepts were added. It seated all three hundred boys and the school's masters. The pulpit was given as a memorial to B. Watson, Esq, and two stained glass windows were added in memory of Frederick Humby, an old Watts boy who lost his life in the Titanic sinking of 1912.

=== Closure ===
The school was closed in 1953, when the remaining boys were transferred to other Barnardo's training ship establishments, mostly on the south coast. Old boys concerned about the chapel were assured that Barnardo's Clerical Organising Secretary, working with the Bishop of Norwich, would be making arrangements for its preservation and that the relocation of the memorial tablets and windows was being considered.

=== Today ===
The main school building was demolished and its site was returned to grass apart from the captains 5 bedroom house which is the last remainders of the school, the rest became a poultry farm.

After the closure of the poultry operation, four seven-bedroom houses were built on the site.

The chapel survives as a private residence, after some years of being used as a piggery. The chapel memorial windows were removed by Barnardo's in 1978 and sold at auction. They are now in private hands in the United States.

Some of the other school buildings are still in ruins, although most have been renovated and restored to domestic use.

The road remains private from the bridge over the river Wensum up to Bintree woods and is maintained by the residents.

== Notable old boys ==
- Captain Frank Beck, King Edward VII land agent in its public school days.
- Fred Copeman OBE. Royal Navy mutineer, and subsequently Commander of the British Battalion of the XV International Brigade.
- Sir John Mills, a famous British actor, was born at Watts Naval School, where his father was a master.

== Heritage ==
- A photographic display, and some small items from the school are displayed in the museum at County School railway station.
- An information board charting the history of the school was unveiled beside the school's graveyard during the centenary celebrations.
