= Buxton, Norfolk =

Village in Norfolk, England

Coordinates: 52.750°N 1.300°E

Buxton
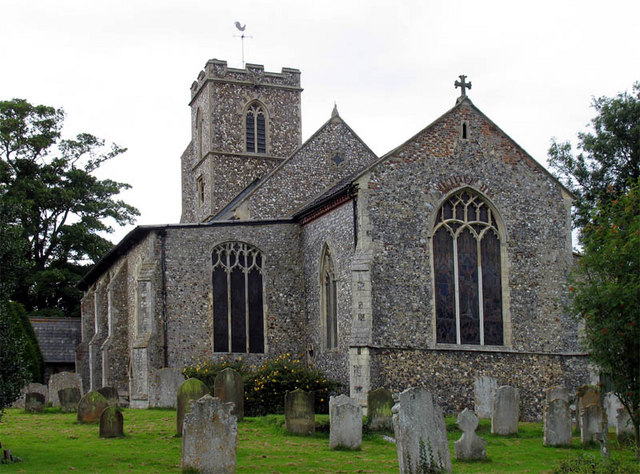
- St. Andrew's Church

- Location within Norfolk
- Civil parish: Buxton with Lamas
- District: Broadland
- Shire county: Norfolk
- Region: East
- Country: England
- Sovereign state: United Kingdom
- Post town: Norwich
- Postcode district: NR10
- Dialling code: 01603
- UK Parliament: Broadland and Fakenham

Buxton is a village and former civil parish, now in the parish of Buxton with Lamas, in the Broadland district, in the English county of Norfolk. It is 3 1/2 miles (5.6 km) south-east of Aylsham and 9 miles (14 km) north of Norwich.

== History ==
Buxton is of Anglo-Saxon and Viking origin, and in Domesday Book it was recorded as a settlement of 34 households in the hundred of South Erpingham. The principal landowner was Ralph de Beaufour. Buxton Watermill has stood in the village in some form since before Domesday Book and was last rebuilt in 1754 by the local merchant, William Pepper.

In 1931 the parish had a population of 490. On 1 April 1935, the parish was combined with the neighbouring parish of Lamas and Little Hautbois to form Buxton with Lamas.

Nearby Dudwick Park is a grade II listed building and was built for John Wright, a Quaker banker, in the eighteenth century. Wright's charitable donations to the village resulted in the construction of what is now Buxton Primary School and an institution for young offenders, where Rowan House currently stands. By the nineteenth century Dudwick Park had passed to the Sewell family, another Quaker family, who further extended the village school; in 1927 they funded the construction of the village hall. In 1937 the house was passed to Percy Briscoe, a tea-planter from Ceylon, who significantly remodelled the exterior.

The village was home to a workhouse during the eighteenth century under the provisions of the English Poor Laws. The foundations of the building still exist on the Buxton-Horstead road.

== St Andrew's Church ==
Buxton's parish church is dedicated to Saint Andrew and dates to the 14th century. It is grade II listed. The church was significantly remodelled in the 1850s with stained glass depicting the Nativity, Crucifixion and the Ascension of Jesus designed by Charles Clutterbuck, as well as depictions of the Parable of the Good Samaritan and the Raising of Lazarus by Thomas Willement and other works by Ward and Hughes.

A new bell commemorating the Platinum Jubilee of Elizabeth II was raised in April 2023. It is the only one in the United Kingdom that carries the Queen's Platinum Jubilee dedication.

== Transport ==
Buxton Lamas railway station was opened in July 1879 by the Great Eastern Railway, which connected the village to Aylsham South, Coltishall and beyond. It was closed to passengers in September 1952 and then to freight in April 1965. The Bure Valley Railway now runs a heritage miniature line through the village. A new station, Buxton railway station, provides services to Wroxham and Aylsham.

Bus routes that serve Buxton link the village to Norwich, Aylsham, Wroxham, and North Walsham.

== Notable people ==
- John Stubbs (1541–after 25 September 1589), an English Puritan pamphleteer
- Thomas Cubitt (1788–1855), builder and architect, born in Buxton
- Anna Sewell (1820–1878), novelist and author of Black Beauty, lived in Buxton.
