= Coltishall railway station =

Railway station in Norfolk, England

Coltishall
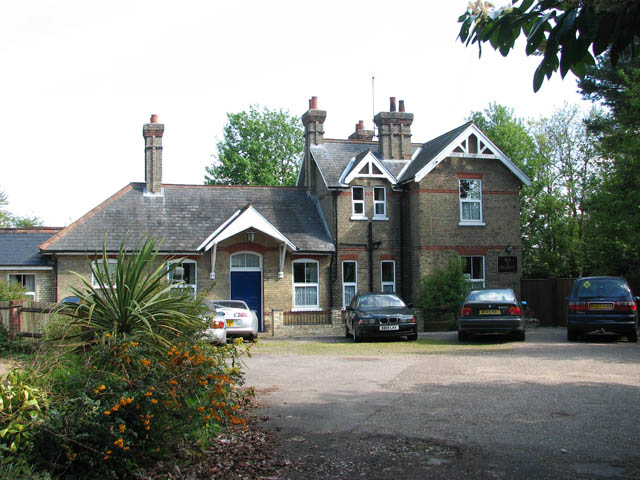
- The original station buildings are now a private house.

General information
- Location: Coltishall, Broadland, Norfolk; England
- Coordinates: 52.73360°N 1.35933°E
- Grid reference: TG269204
- System: Station on heritage railway
- Operator: Bure Valley Railway
- Platforms: 2

History
- Original company: East Norfolk Railway
- Pre-grouping: Great Eastern Railway
- Post-grouping: London & North Eastern Railway; Eastern Region of British Railways

Key dates
- 8 July 1879: Opened
- 15 September 1952: Closed to passengers
- 19 April 1965: Closed to freight
- 10 July 1990: Re-opened to passengers (BVR)
Location

Coltishall railway station serves the village of Coltishall in Norfolk, and is currently operated by the Bure Valley Railway.

== Standard gauge operation ==
The railway line from Wroxham to County School opened in 1880, with a station at Coltishall. This was a branch line, joined at County School to the Great Eastern Railway's service from Dereham to Wells-next-the-Sea. The station was host to a LNER camping coach from 1935 to 1939. Passenger services were ended in 1952 by the Eastern Region of British Railways, and Coltishall station closed. The original station buildings are now privately owned and operated as bed and breakfast accommodation.

== Bure Valley Railway ==
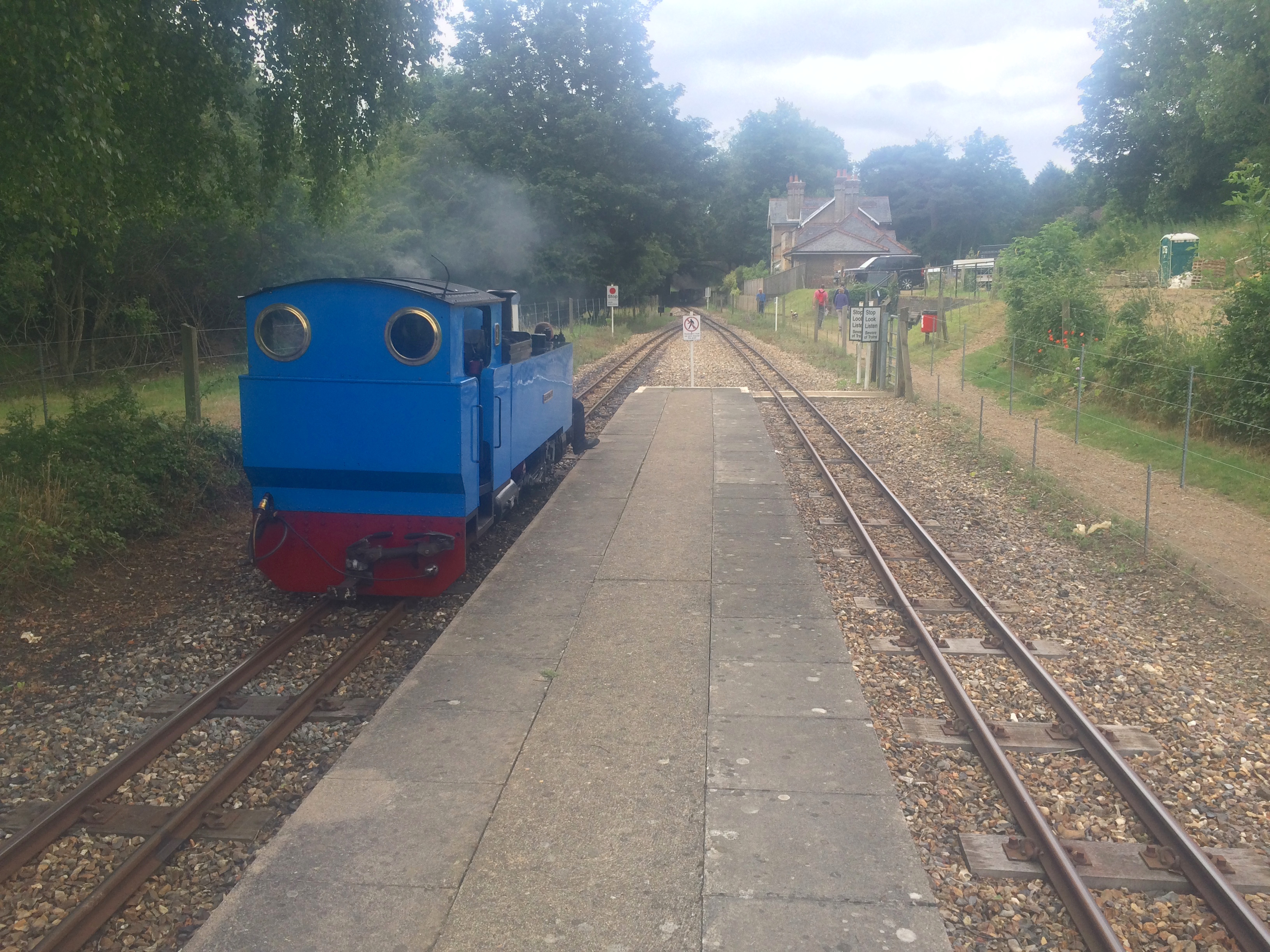
A locomotive waits at Coltishall station for a train in the opposite direction. The original station buildings are visible in the distance.

The line from Wroxham to Aylsham was reopened in 1990 as a narrow gauge railway. The station at Coltishall was reopened as part of this development. The station is a request stop, although many trains are obliged to stop here as it is also a passing place on the single-track railway. There are two platforms. The station is located near to the village of Coltishall, although some distance from its main tourist destinations, the former RAF Coltishall airbase, and the staithe.

Preceding station	Heritage railways	Following station
Buxton towards Aylsham	Bure Valley Railway	Wroxham Terminus
Disused railways
Buxton Lamas; Line and station closed	Great Eastern East Norfolk Railway	Hoveton & Wroxham; Line closed, station open
