= Hoveton & Wroxham railway station =

Railway station in Norfolk, England

Hoveton & Wroxham
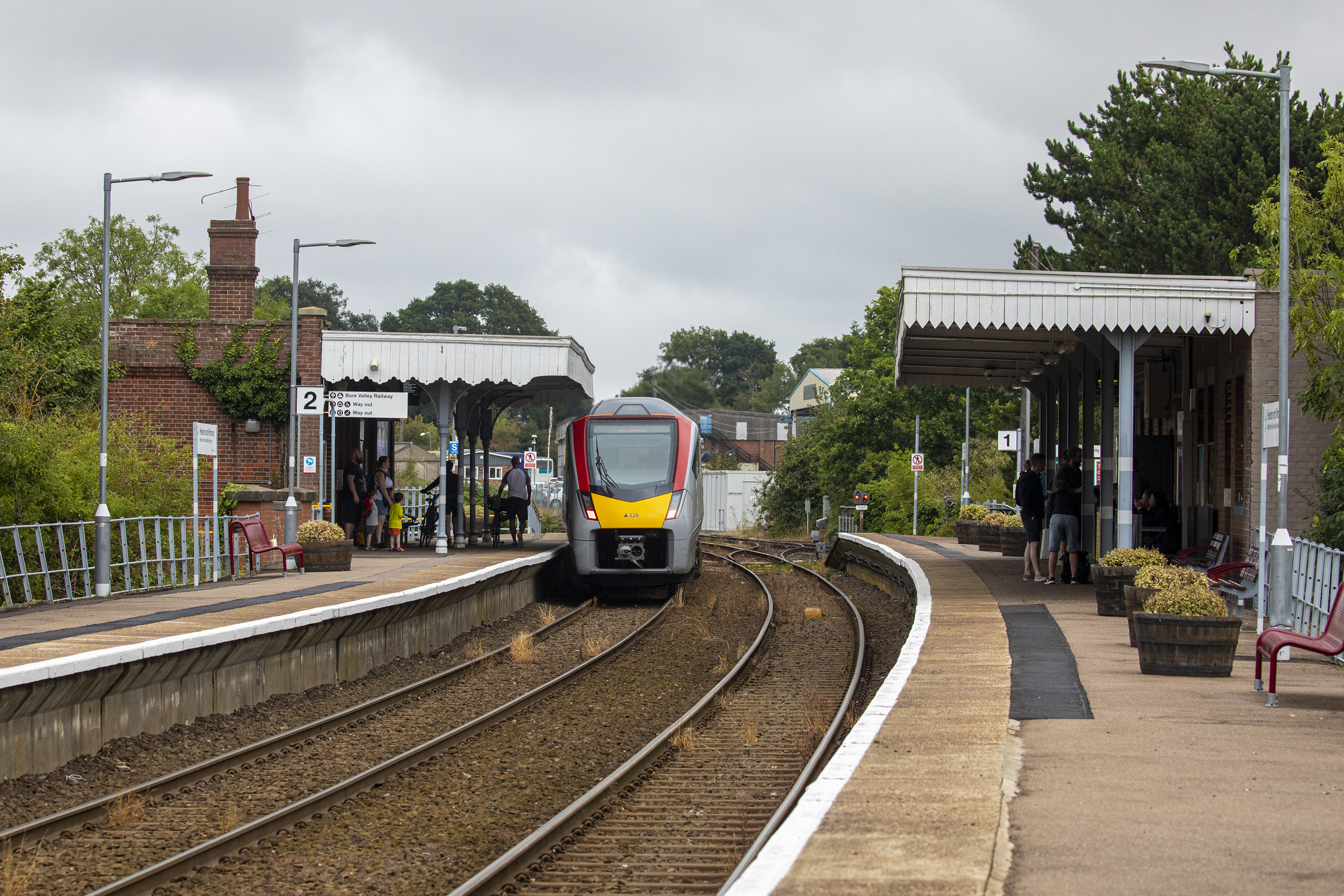
- Both platforms, showing the station buildings

General information
- Location: Hoveton, North Norfolk; England
- Coordinates: 52.7154°N 1.4081°E
- Grid reference: TG302185
- Managed by: Greater Anglia
- Platforms: 2

Other information
- Station code: HXM
- Classification: DfT category F1

Key dates
- 20 October 1874: Opened as Wroxham
- 12 May 1966: Renamed Hoveton & Wroxham

Passengers
- 2020/21: ▼38,880
- 2021/22: ▲0.112 million
- 2022/23: ▲0.125 million
- 2023/24: ▲0.127 million
- 2024/25: ▲0.134 million
Location
Notes
- Passenger statistics from the Office of Rail and Road

Hoveton & Wroxham railway station is on the Bittern Line in Norfolk, England, serving the village of Hoveton and the adjacent village of Wroxham (the two settlements are usually regarded as one). It is 8 miles 61 chains (14.1 km) down the line from Norwich and is situated between Salhouse and Worstead.

It was previously the site of a junction, with the East Norfolk Railway to County School diverging from the Norwich line a short distance north of the station; however the former line closed to all traffic in 1982 and was subsequently dismantled.

The station is the last on the double-track section of the Bittern line: it becomes single-track north of here to Sheringham (except for a passing loop at North Walsham and a short section into the station at Cromer).

The station is managed by Greater Anglia, which also operates all passenger trains that call.

== Heritage connection ==
A nearby station named Wroxham is the southern terminus of the narrow gauge Bure Valley Railway, which runs to Aylsham on the trackbed of part of the former East Norfolk Railway route to County School. This heritage line opened in 1990, reusing the former line's route. The heritage station is linked to the main Hoveton & Wroxham station by a footpath.

== Services ==
All services at Hoveton & Wroxham are operated by Greater Anglia using Class 755 BMUs.

The typical service on all days of the week is one train per hour in each direction between Norwich and Sheringham via Cromer.

| Preceding station | National Rail | Following station |
|---|---|---|
| Salhouse | Greater Anglia Bittern Line | Worstead |
| | Heritage railways | |
Interchange with Wroxham on the Bure Valley Railway
| | Historical railways | |
| Terminus | Great Eastern Railway East Norfolk Railway | Coltishall |
