= Buxton railway station (Norfolk) =

Heritage railway station in England

Coordinates: 52.75760°N 1.30702°E

Buxton (Norfolk)
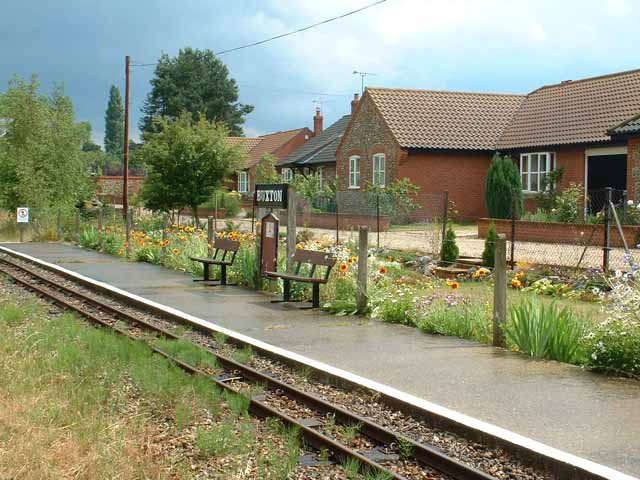
- The station platform

General information
- Location: Buxton, Norfolk; England

Key dates
- 1879: Opened
- 1952: Closed
- 1990: Reopened on Bure Valley Railway
Location

Buxton railway station serves the village of Buxton in Norfolk. The station was named Buxton Lamas when it operated as part of the East Norfolk Railway and operated from 8 July 1879 to 15 September 1952. After closure, the trackbed was purchased by Broadland District Council, which led to the construction of a narrow-gauge railway, the Bure Valley Railway, which opened on 10 July 1990 and currently serves the station. It is a request stop on the railway, and is popular with walkers and cyclists.

Preceding station	Heritage railways	Following station
Brampton towards Aylsham	Bure Valley Railway	Coltishall towards Wroxham

== Bibliography ==
- Quick, Michael (2023). Railway Passenger Stations in Great Britain: A Chronology (PDF) (5th ed.). London: Railway and Canal Historical Society.
