= Brampton railway station (Norfolk) =

Heritage railway station in Norfolk, England

Brampton
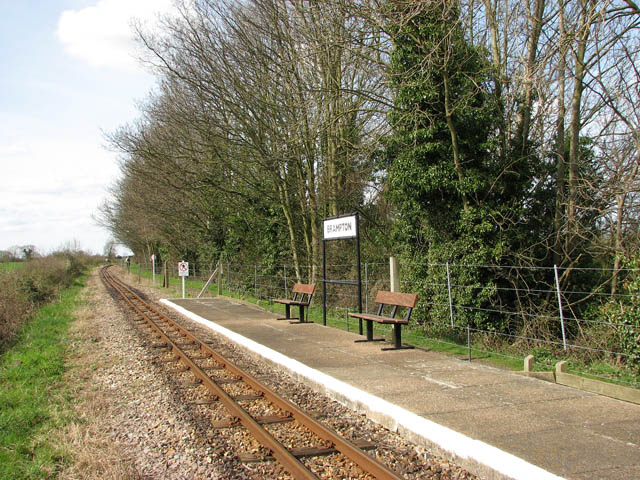

General information
- Location: Brampton, Norfolk, Broadland, Norfolk; England
- Coordinates: 52.76709°N 1.29076°E
- Grid reference: TG221238
- System: Station on heritage railway
- Platforms: 1

History
- Original company: Bure Valley Railway

Key dates
- 1990: Opened
Location

Brampton railway station serves the village of Brampton in Norfolk and is operated by the Bure Valley Railway, a narrow gauge heritage railway operation.

== Route ==
Preceding station	Heritage railways	Following station
Aylsham Terminus	Bure Valley Railway	Buxton towards Wroxham
