= Brampton railway station =

Brampton railway station may refer to:

== Canada ==
- Brampton GO Station, Ontario, a CNR line station serving VIA and GO passengers

== United Kingdom ==
- Brampton railway station (Cumbria)
- Brampton railway station (Suffolk)
- Brampton railway station (Norfolk)
- Brampton Halt railway station, Newcastle-under-Lyme
- Pitsford and Brampton railway station, formerly known as Brampton, Northamptonshire

== See also ==
- Mount Pleasant GO Station, Brampton, Ontario
- Bramalea GO Station, Brampton, Ontario
