= Wroxham Broad =

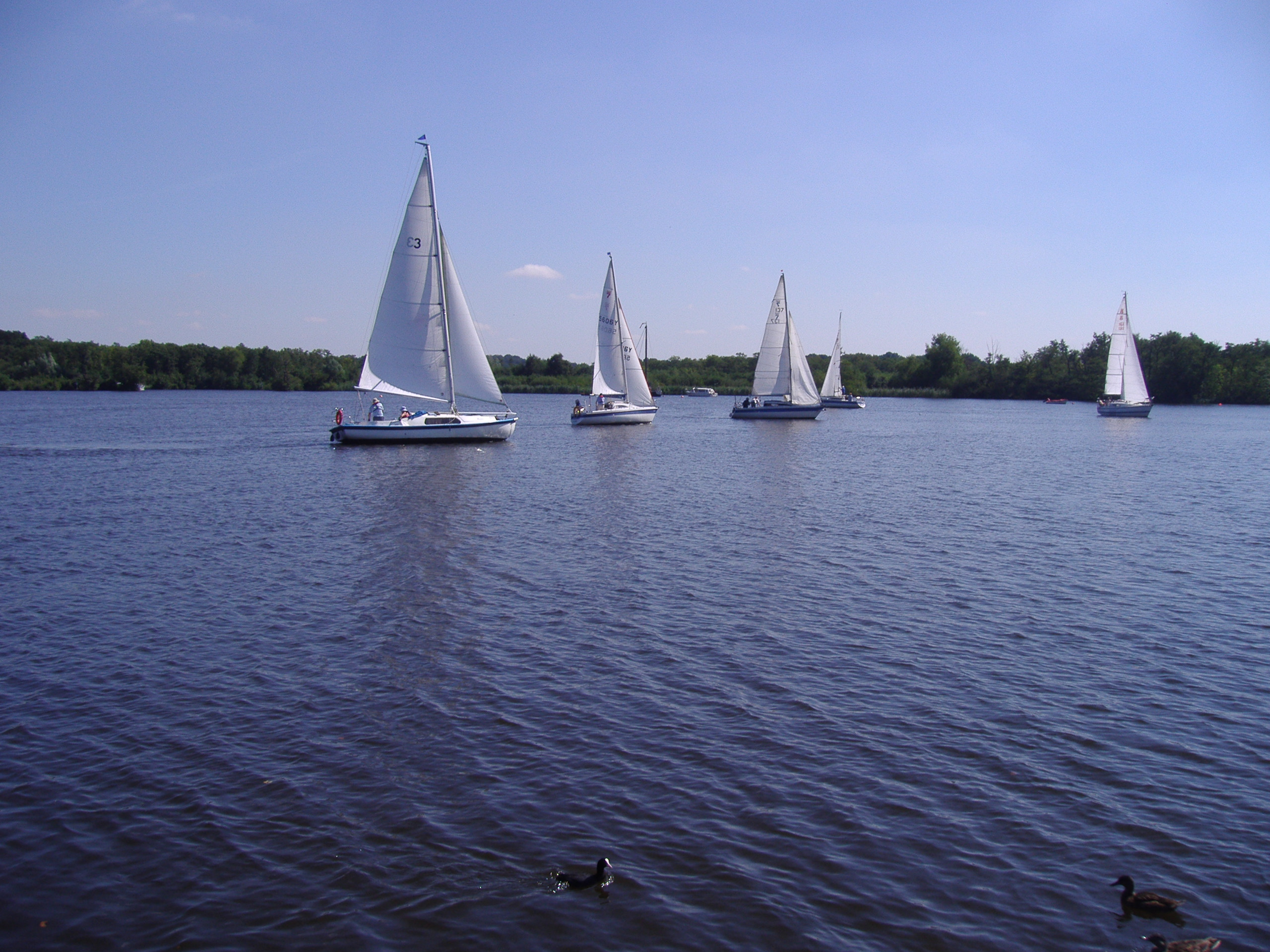
- Interactive map of Wroxham Broad
- Location: Near Wroxham, Norfolk, England
- Coordinates: 52°42′06″N 1°24′17″E
- Type: Freshwater lake
- Primary inflows: River Bure
- Primary outflows: River Bure
- Basin countries: United Kingdom
- Surface area: 34.4 ha (85 acres)
- Average depth: 1.3 m (4 ft 3 in)

Wroxham Broad is an area of open water alongside the River Bure near the village of Wroxham in Norfolk, England within The Broads National Park. The Norfolk Broads were formed by the flooding of ancient peat workings. Wroxham Broad has an area of 34.4 hectares (85 acres) and a mean depth of 1.3 metres. It lies to the west of the Bure, with two navigable openings between river and broad. The village and broad lie in an area of fairly intensive agriculture, with areas of wet woodland adjoining the broad and river.

Since 1937, under lease from the Trafford estate, the broad has been home to the Norfolk Broads Yacht Club. Visiting boats are not allowed to land, but navigation is allowed.

Between 2000 and 2005 the island between the two channels linking Wroxham Broad to the Bure underwent restoration to stop erosion and improve the island's ecology, which had become degraded. The project was a joint initiative involving the Broads Authority, Norfolk Broads Yacht Club and the local landowner, Trafford Estates. Scrub was cleared and a stretch of piling installed, allowing sedge, reed and rush to grow back. By 2005 it was reported that more birds, including kingfishers, were nesting on the island and the rare Cetti's warbler was often spotted. Greater numbers of ducks, including pochard and tufted ducks, now wintered nearby and there was a greater profusion of wild flowers and marsh flora including orchids. During the course of the work, in 2004, volunteers came across an unexploded Second World War hand grenade in the dredgings, which was exploded by an army bomb disposal team.

Close to Wroxham Broad stands the early 18th century Broad House, a Queen Anne style estate house and formerly the seat of the local land-owning Trafford family. In 2006, it became a well-regarded 'boutique' hotel which closed in late 2010. There are proposals that it be reclassified as a single dwelling.

Alfred John Norman Chamberlin (1822–1883), and his wife Betsy, owned the Broad House property and most of the Wroxham Broad, before the Traffords acquired it after Alfred's death about 1885. People flocked to their property to watch the Wroxham Regatta. (See painting "Wroxham Regatta -1868" by Claude Nursey.) Alfred had inherited the 300 acre property about 1858 from his unmarried cousin, Elizabeth Foulsham (1774–1857). She had inherited it from her unmarried half-brother, William Buckle (1765–1840) who had inherited it from his maternal grandfather, John Howse (d. 1817). Howse's forebears had owned the property since 1735. Prior owners have been recorded back to 1593.

There is a locomotive at the Bure Valley Railway in Norfolk which is named after Wroxham Broad.

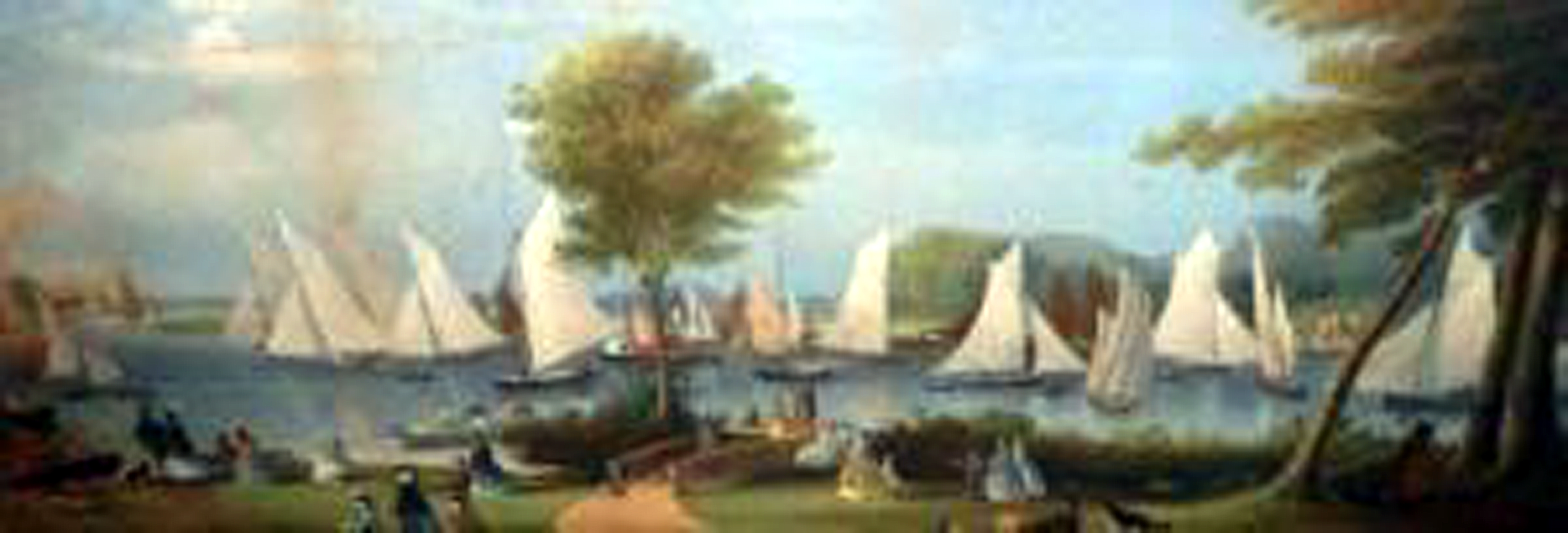
Wroxham Regatta 1868 view from Broad House by Claude L. Nursey

== In literature ==
The Broad features in Coot Club and The Big Six, two books by Arthur Ransome set in the Norfolk Broads.
