= Buxton Lamas railway station =

Disused railway station in England

Coordinates: 52.75663°N 1.30773°E

Buxton Lamas
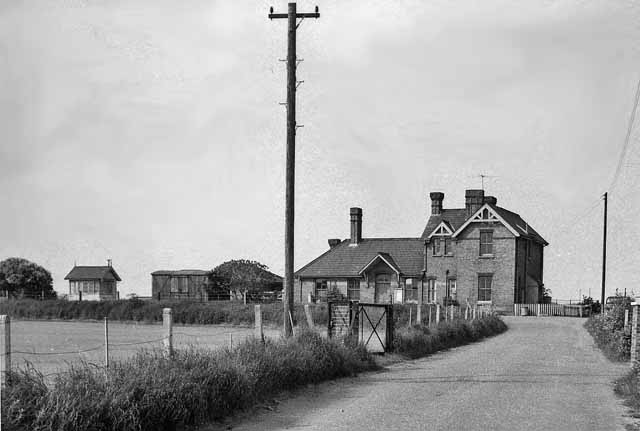
- The station in 1963

General information
- Location: Buxton with Lamas, Broadland, Norfolk; England
- Grid reference: TG233228
- Platforms: 1

Other information
- Status: Disused

History
- Pre-grouping: East Norfolk Railway; Great Eastern Railway
- Post-grouping: London & North Eastern Railway; Eastern Region of British Railways

Key dates
- 8 July 1879: Opened
- 15 September 1952: Closed to passengers
- 19 April 1965: Closed to freight
Location

Buxton Lamas was a railway station in Buxton with Lamas, Norfolk. It was located near the Bure Valley Railway's present Buxton station.

Preceding station	Disused railways	Following station
Aylsham South; Line and station closed	Great Eastern Railway	Coltishall; Line and station closed
