= Wroxham =

Village in Norfolk, England

Coordinates: 52.706°N 1.412°E

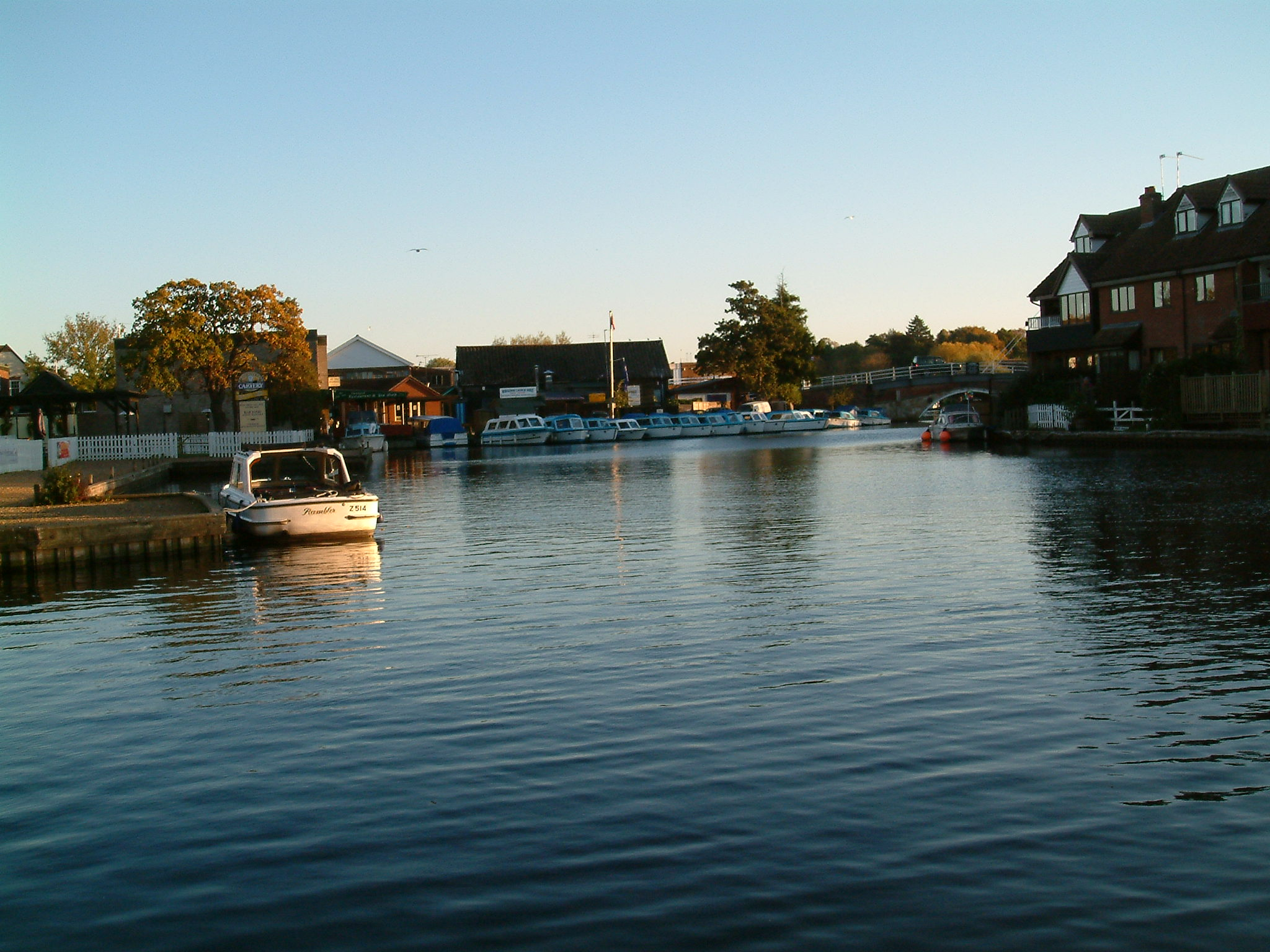
- The Coltishall side of Wroxham Bridge

- Location within Norfolk
- Area: 6.21 km^{2} (2.40 sq mi)
- Population: 1,502 (2011)
  - Density: 242/km^{2} (630/sq mi)
- OS grid reference: TG3017
- Civil parish: Wroxham
- District: Broadland
- Shire county: Norfolk
- Region: East
- Country: England
- Sovereign state: United Kingdom
- Post town: NORWICH
- Postcode district: NR12
- Dialling code: 01603
- Police: Norfolk
- Fire: Norfolk
- Ambulance: East of England
- UK Parliament: Broadland and Fakenham

Wroxham is a village and civil parish in the English county of Norfolk. The civil parish of Wroxham has an area of 6.21 square kilometres (2.40 sq mi), and in 2001, had a population of 1,532 in 666 households. A reduced population of 1,502 in 653 households was noted in the 2011 Census. The village is situated within the Norfolk Broads on the south side of a loop in the middle reaches of the River Bure. It lies in an elevated position above the Bure, between Belaugh Broad to the west, and Wroxham Broad to the east and south east. Wroxham is some 13 kilometres (8.1 mi) north-east of Norwich, to which it is linked by the A1151 road. The village and broad lie in an area of fairly intensive agriculture, with areas of wet woodland adjoining the broad and river. For the purposes of local government, the parish falls within the district of Broadland although the river, broad and their immediate environs fall within the executive area of the Broads Authority. The villages of Hoveton and Wroxham are connected together by the road bridge that crosses the Bure.

The origin of the name Wroxham is not known for certain; but may mean 'Wrocc's homestead/village' or 'buzzard homestead/village'.

== Wroxham Bridge ==
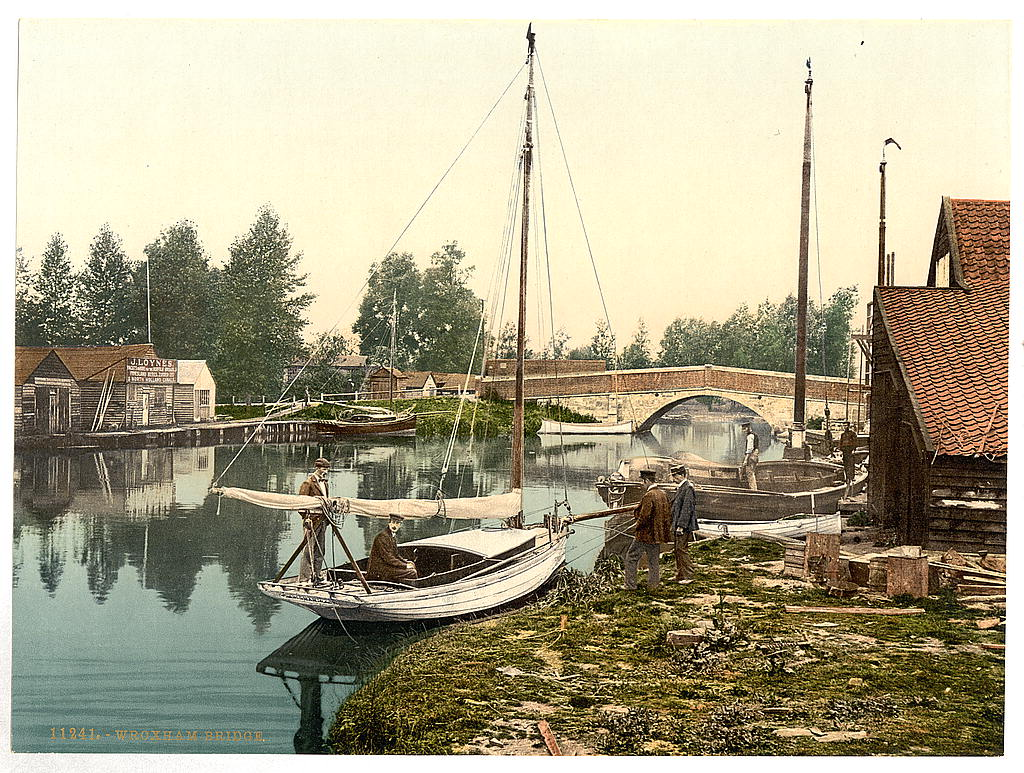
Wroxham, England, ca. 1890 - 1900.

Wroxham Bridge was rebuilt with brick and stone in 1619, replacing a bridge built in 1576, which itself replaced an earlier, probably wooden, structure. It is considered to be the second most difficult on the Broads to navigate (after Potter Heigham) and a pilot station sits on the Hoveton side of the river to assist boaters for a fee: £12 each way per boat.

== The Broad ==
Wroxham Broad lies about one mile downstream from Wroxham Bridge. The broad has an area of 34.4 hectares and a mean depth of 1.3 metres. It lies to the west of the Bure, with two navigable openings between river and broad. The broad is popular for sailing and is the home of the Norfolk Broads Yacht Club. It is also an important habitat for broadland flora and fauna. Between 2000 and 2005, the island between the two channels linking Wroxham Broad to the Bure underwent restoration to stop erosion and improve the island's ecology, which had become degraded. The project was a joint initiative involving the Broads Authority, Norfolk Broads Yacht Club, and the local landowner, Trafford Estates. Scrub was cleared and a stretch of piling installed, allowing sedge, reed, and rush to grow back. By 2005 it was reported that more birds, including kingfishers, were nesting on the island and the Cetti's warbler was often spotted. Greater numbers of ducks, including pochard and tufted duck, now wintered nearby and there was a greater profusion of wild flowers and marsh flora including orchids. During the course of the work in 2004, volunteers came across an unexploded Second World War hand grenade in the dredgings, which was exploded by an army bomb disposal team.

== Capital of the Broads ==
Wroxham is often called the Capital of the Broads, an accolade that may, with some merit, be challenged by Hoveton, where the majority of local businesses and boatyards are situated; it has been the primary centre on the Broads for boating holidays and excursions from the late nineteenth century, when expansion of the rail network had made access to the area easier.

The East Norfolk Railway arrived in Wroxham and Hoveton between 1874 and 1876. John Loynes, regarded as the father of the Broadland holiday business, started the first boat hire firm on the Broads of Wroxham where he moved the business he had started in Norwich in 1878.

== Wroxham and Hoveton ==
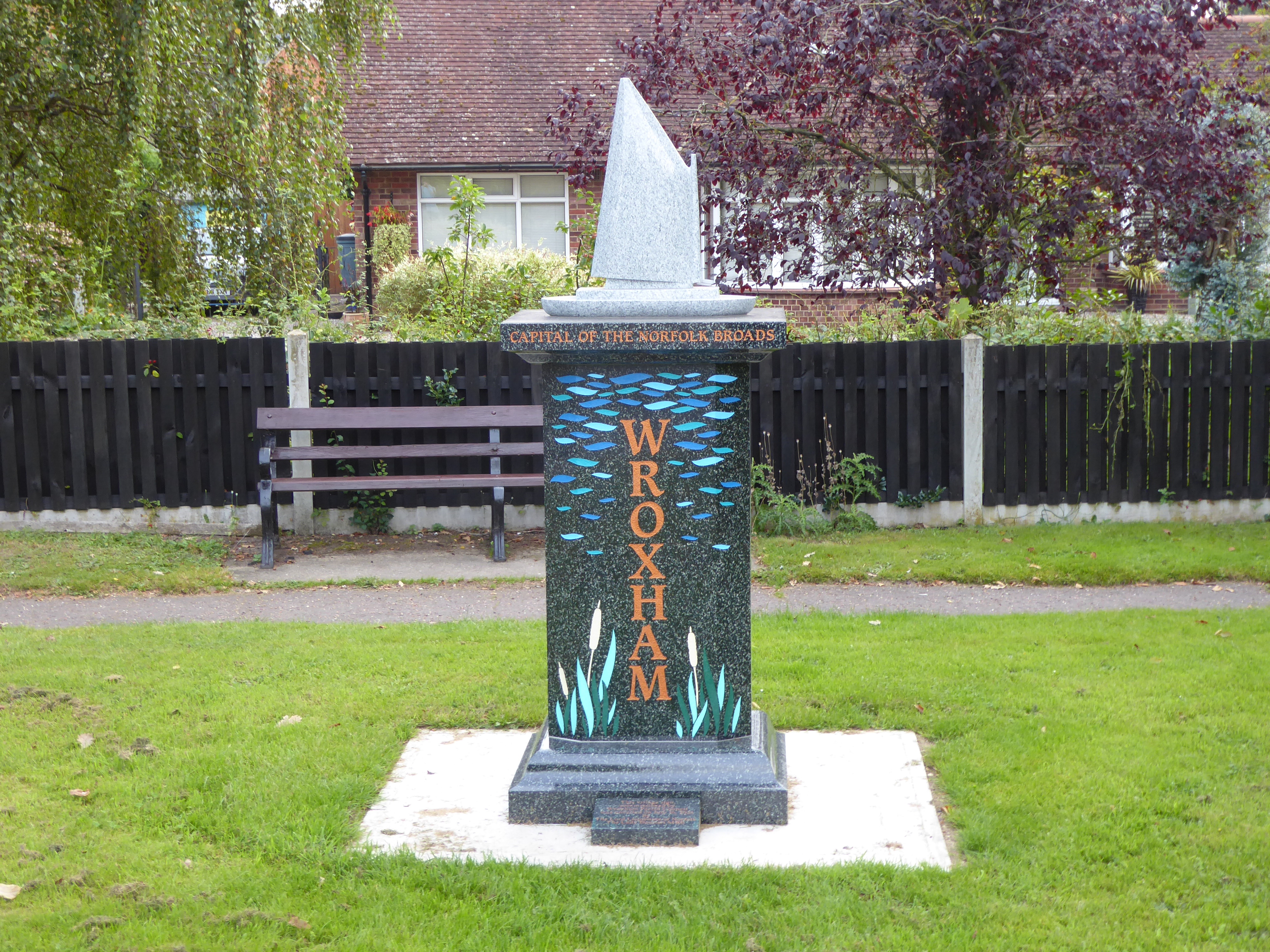
Wroxham village sign

Both Wroxham and Hoveton have several boat building and pleasure craft hire yards. Other local industries include the canning of soft fruits. Wroxham village had at one time, for much of the 20th century, its own public house (The Castle, in Norwich Road), four village shops (one in Castle Street and three in Norwich Road), and a primary school (in Church Lane), all now closed. A public library was built near Bridge Broad, a small broad near Wroxham Bridge, in the 1960s.

Wroxham has almost merged with Hoveton, with each village growing on either bank of the river, and much of the area's commercial activity developing in Hoveton. The area around Wroxham Bridge is a local shopping centre, mainly due to the presence of Roys of Wroxham – situated near Wroxham Bridge since 1899 and, since the 1930s, proud bearer of the accolade world's largest village store. Roys owns much of the commercial property in the area. Roys of Wroxham is entirely situated in Hoveton, as are the local post office and the Hotel Wroxham.

It seems that the proximity and name of Wroxham Bridge, one side of which, naturally, is in Hoveton, gave rise to the common erroneous attribution of the name 'Wroxham' to that part of Hoveton that is close to the river and may be considered the commercial centre for both villages. Like many other local amenities, the railway station is actually located in Hoveton.

Wroxham in 1954 is featured in film held by the Cinema Museum in London. Ref HM0568.

== Significant buildings ==
The Church of St Mary the Virgin is a grade I listed building and stands at the top of a steep slope above the River Bure. It is built of flint with limestone dressings and with lead roofs. It has a high tower and a famous Norman (12th century) south doorway, stained blue, with seven orders and three shafts, described by the architectural historian Nikolaus Pevsner as 'barbaric and glorious'. The church was heavily restored in the Victorian age. In the churchyard is the Trafford Mausoleum, mediaeval in appearance but built in 1831 to designs by the architect Anthony Salvin. The area near the church was historically the core of the village. A brick and pantile manor house to the south east of the church has stepped gables showing Dutch influence, and a panel dating to 1623. A picturesque red brick grade II listed cottage dating from about 1820 abuts the churchyard.

Other significant houses in the village include Keys Hill House, built to the east of Norwich Road around 1890 by important Norwich architect, Edward Boardman, as a substantial country house in Jacobean style. It was briefly used as a camp for Italian prisoners of war and later as an old people's home. George Formby, the early twentieth-century entertainer, once owned a riverside home in Beech Road, off the Avenue, a thatched house called Heronby, built in 1907. Nearby is Charles Close, a mid-20th century residential development on the site of the Charles family's large Georgian mansion, Wroxham House, demolished in 1954. Closer to Wroxham Broad to the south stands the early 18th century red brick estate house Broad House, formerly the seat of the local land-owning Trafford family, more recently a 'boutique' hotel. On the west side of Norwich Road stands the large former village inn, The Castle, which has been converted into flats. The red brick Victorian school house stands between Norwich Road and the church, the additional post-war school buildings having been demolished after the school closed in the 1980s (although the old school house continued as a Steiner school until the 2000s).

== Sport and leisure ==
Wroxham has a non-League football club, Wroxham F.C., who play at Trafford Park.

== Notable people ==
William Macintyre (born 2007), racing driver

== Literary reference ==
The 20th-century children's author, Arthur Ransome, visited Wroxham in the 1930s. In his book Coot Club (1934), he describes the busy scene on the river at Wroxham Bridge with numerous boats, a wherry, punts, motor cruisers, and sailing yachts, jostling for a mooring.

== Wherry base ==
In April 2011, a base for the restoration of the Norfolk wherry was opened in Hartwell Road by the Wherry Yacht Charter Charitable Trust. Work began with the restoration of the Edwardian wherry yacht, the Norada, with restoration of another wherry yacht, the Olive, and the pleasure wherry, the Hathor, projected over the following two years. Once restored, the wherries are intended to be available for use by school and youth groups as well as by private charter. A third of the cost of the project came from the Heritage Lottery Fund.

== Transport ==
=== Railways ===
Hoveton and Wroxham railway station is located over in Hoveton and was previously called Wroxham. It is a stop on the Bittern Line between Norwich, Cromer and Sheringham, with services operated by Greater Anglia.

==== Heritage ====
The Bure Valley Railway is a 15 in (381 mm) minimum gauge heritage railway which runs from Wroxham to Aylsham. At 9 miles (14 km), it is Norfolk's longest railway of less than standard gauge.

Barton House Railway is a miniature steam-driven railway (now two railways) large enough for passengers, with a full-size signal box and signals, and a museum of railway artefacts. It has been open to the public since 1963, in a large riverside garden in Hartwell Road. It is based on the Midland & Great Northern Joint Railway, which operated some of the train services in East Anglia before British railway nationalisation in 1947. The original railway runs on a 3.5-inch (89 mm) track with a miniature steam locomotive. In 1979, work started on the 7.25-inch (184 mm) 'Riverside' railway which ran initially with an electric engine and later with a steam locomotive. The railway is run by volunteers and makes donations from proceeds to local charities.

=== Buses ===
Bus routes in and around Wroxham are operated primarily by First Eastern Counties and Konectbus. Destinations include Norwich, Sprowston, Aylsham and Acle.
