= Brampton, Norfolk =

Village in Norfolk, England

Coordinates: 52.76°N 1.28°E

Brampton
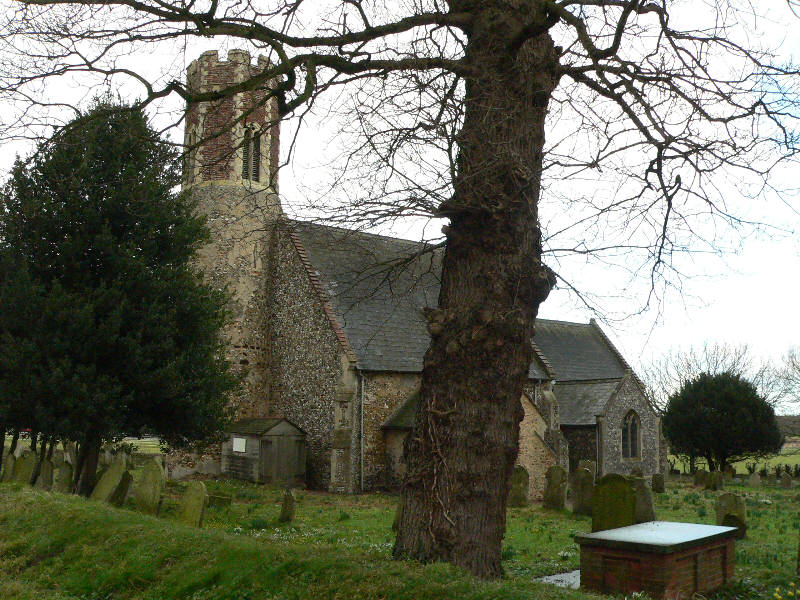
- St. Peter's Church, Brampton

- Location within Norfolk
- Area: 4.77 km^{2} (1.84 sq mi)
- Population: 199 (2021)
  - Density: 42/km^{2} (110/sq mi)
- OS grid reference: TG213231
- Civil parish: Brampton
- District: Broadland
- Shire county: Norfolk
- Region: East
- Country: England
- Sovereign state: United Kingdom
- Post town: NORWICH
- Postcode district: NR10
- Police: Norfolk
- Fire: Norfolk
- Ambulance: East of England
- UK Parliament: Broadland and Fakenham

Brampton is a village and civil parish in the English county of Norfolk. It is 2.4 miles (3.9 km) south-east of Aylsham and 10 miles (16 km) north of Norwich.

== History ==
Brampton was the subject of an archeological excavation in the 1960s which revealed the existence of a Roman bath house and almost 140 pottery kilns. The village name is Anglo-Saxon in origin and in the Domesday Book it is recorded as a settlement of 30 households in the hundred of South Erpingham. It was part of the estates of William de Warenne and Ralph de Beaufour.

Oxnead Hall was built by the Paston family during the 16th century on medieval foundations. Clement Paston was responsible for the original phase of building, and during the 17th century the house became "one of the most magnificent houses in England". It is thought that King Charles II was entertained in the hall by Robert Paston, 1st Earl of Yarmouth. Most of the building was demolished during the 18th century, although earthworks and some sections of building remain.

== Geography ==
Brampton is located in the Bure Valley, and the River Bure marks the northern border of the parish. Brampton Station is an intermediate halt on the Bure Valley Railway.

According to the 2021 census, Brampton has a population of 199 people which shows a slight increase from the 191 people recorded in the 2011 census.

== St. Peter's Church ==
Brampton's parish church is dedicated to Saint Peter and is one of Norfolk's 124 remaining round-tower churches. The church dates to the 12th century and is Grade II. The church tower had further additions made in the 15th century and there was significant restoration of the church in the 19th century. There are notable medieval wall brasses which show several members of the Brampton family.
