= Cromer Tunnel =

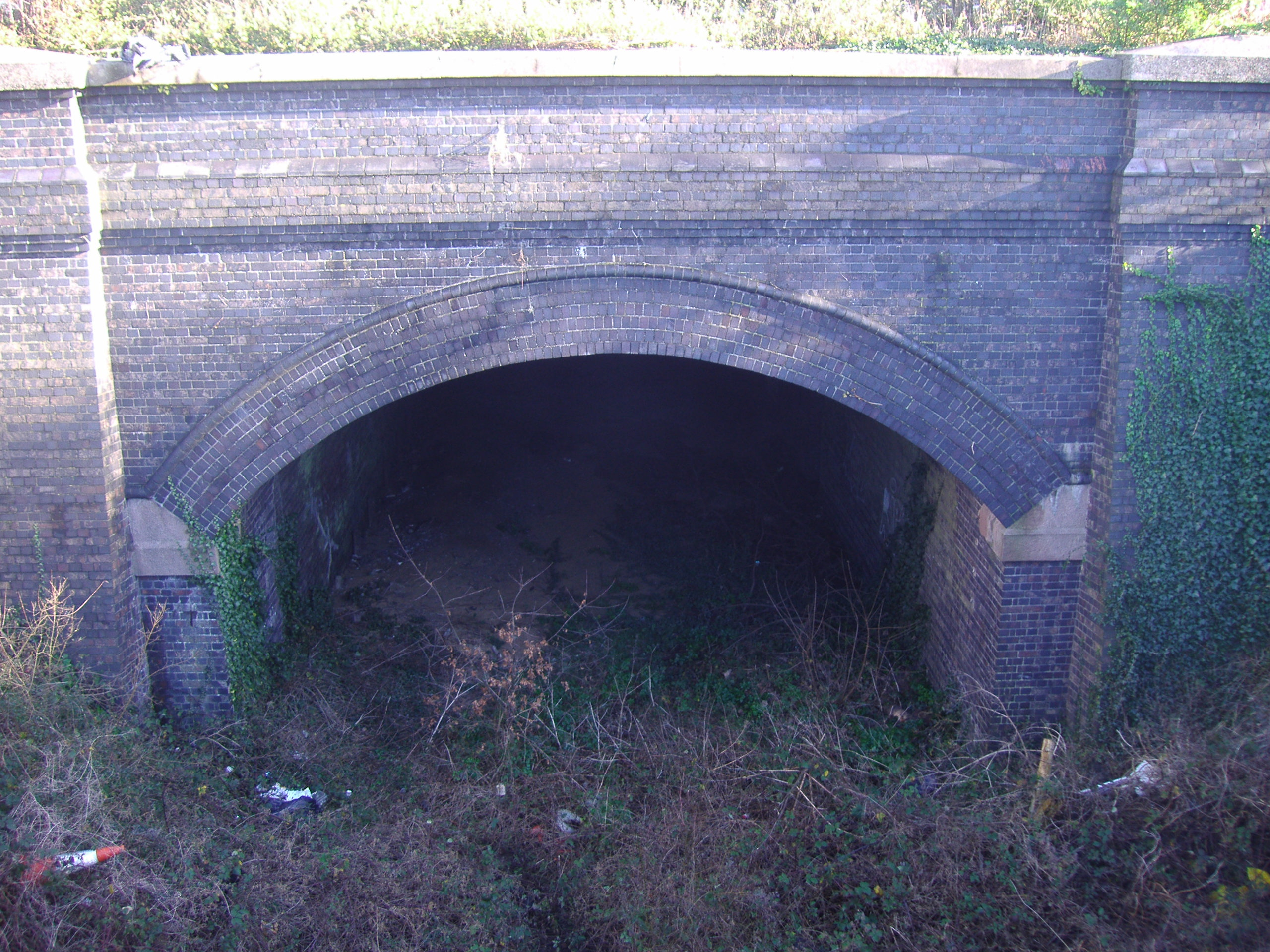
- The disused Cromer Tunnel
- Interactive map of Cromer Tunnel

Overview
- Line: One
- Location: Beneath the Great Eastern's Cromer High to Norwich line
- Coordinates: 52.9177°N 1.3091°E
- Status: Disused
- Start: Close to the A149 bridge
- End: Both portals of the tunnels are open
- No. of stations: Provided access Cromer Beach to Mundesley line

Operation
- Owner: The Norfolk and Suffolk Joint Railway
- Operator: The Norfolk and Suffolk Joint Railway
- Character: Undergrowth and modern housing in the area make access difficult

Technical
- No. of tracks: removed

The Cromer Tunnel was built by the Norfolk and Suffolk Joint Railway to take their Cromer Beach to Mundesley line under the Great Eastern's Cromer High to Norwich line. Both portals of the tunnels are open but undergrowth and modern housing in the area make access difficult.

It is the only standard gauge railway tunnel in Norfolk (the narrow gauge Bure Valley Railway crosses Aylsham Bypass by means of a newly constructed Aylsham Bypass Tunnel which replaces the former level crossing).

== See also ==
- Tunnels in the United Kingdom
