= East Norfolk Railway =

Railway line in Norfolk, England

Coordinates: 52.83409°N 1.36517°E

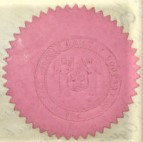

- ENR lines in red, proposed in yellow.

- Foulsham station, ENR

Overview
- Headquarters: London
- Locale: Norfolk, UK
- Dates of operation: 1859–1881
- Successor: Great Eastern Railway

Technical
- Track gauge: 4 ft 8 1/2 in (1,435 mm)

The East Norfolk Railway was a pre-grouping railway company operating a standard gauge 25 mile, mostly single track, railway running between Norwich Thorpe railway station and Cromer in the English county of Norfolk. It opened in 1874, reaching Cromer three years later, and remains mostly operational. The company also operated a branch between Wroxham and County School, which closed to passengers in 1952, and had proposed a branch to Blakeney in 1878, which was never constructed.

== History ==
The plans for the East Norfolk Railway's Aylsham, Cromer and North Walsham lines were first deposited in 1859. The line opened as far as North Walsham in 1874, but was in an incomplete state – with neither crossing keeper's cottages or goods sheds being finished. This contributed to a lack of early cash flow, and liquidity, delayed the extension to Cromer. A temporary railhead was opened at Gunton on 29 July 1876. Gunton station, and the crossing keeper's cottages to the south, were built by Lord Suffield to blend into the estate. The single track railway between Norwich and Cromer being finally opened for the summer of 1877 – although the lightly constructed sand embankments were noted as a concern by the line's inspector. At this time, North Walsham contributed 68.5% of the line's receipts.

East Norfolk Railway Act 1864
- Act of Parliament
- Parliament of the United Kingdom
- Long title: An Act to authorize the making of a Railway from the Great Eastern Railway to North Walsham in the County of Norfolk; and for other Purposes.
- Citation: 27 & 28 Vict. c. cxxii

Dates
- Royal assent: 23 June 1864

Text of statute as originally enacted

East Norfolk Railway Act 1878
- Act of Parliament
- Parliament of the United Kingdom
- Long title: An Act for authorising the East Norfolk Railway Company to raise further money for their main line, for constituting their Aylsham Extension capital a separate capital, for the abandonment of their Wroxham Quay Branch, and for other purposes.
- Citation: 41 & 42 Vict. c. xxxvi

Dates
- Royal assent: 16 April 1878

Text of statute as originally enacted

Great Eastern and East Norfolk Railways Act 1881
- Act of Parliament
- Parliament of the United Kingdom
- Long title: An Act for authorising the sale or transfer to the Great Eastern Railway Company of the Undertaking of the East Norfolk Railway Company; and for other purposes.
- Citation: 44 & 45 Vict. c. xxxvii

Dates
- Royal assent: 3 June 1881

Text of statute as originally enacted

The East Norfolk Railway Act 1864 (27 & 28 Vict. c. cxxii) included plans for a line to Aylsham, diverging south of Wroxham station. In 1876 this plan was revived, and modified, to leave the main line north of Wroxham station. The branch line diverged on a tight 10 chain curve at Wroxham Junction. A large granary was provided at Aylsham, stables were provided at Coltishall for the malt trade and a local man paid for a large shed at Buxton. The Great Eastern Railway had taken control of the East Norfolk Railway by the Great Eastern and East Norfolk Railways Act 1881 (44 & 45 Vict. c. xxxvii) before this line was completed. The branch joined the Great Eastern Railway's line from Dereham to Fakenham at Broom Green, where there was a 20 chain curve. The complete line opened in 1882.

Although nominally independent, the East Norfolk Railway was operated by the Great Eastern Railway from the start of services, and soon passed into ownership of the latter company. Fares on the line, along with goods rates, were harmonized with, and set by, the Great Eastern Railway.

== Routes ==
=== Norwich to Cromer ===
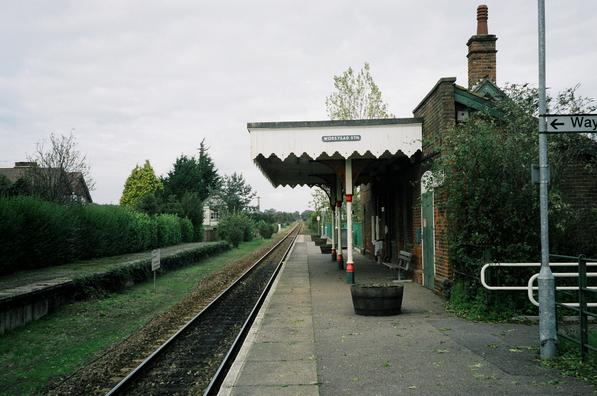
Worstead station, with former signal box in distance

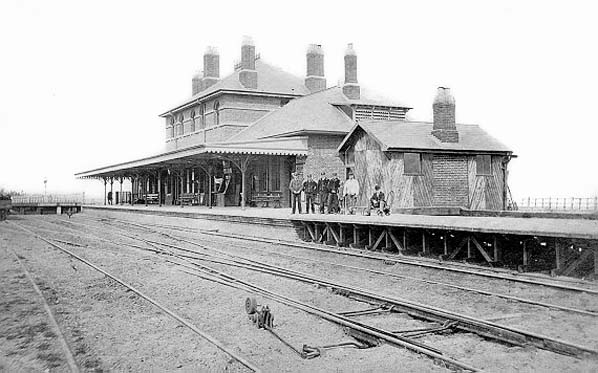
Cromer High (then just "Cromer") shortly after opening

Leaving Norwich Thorpe station, the line followed the Norfolk and Yarmouth Railway until it reached a small halt at Whitlingham railway station. This station has been closed, and the platforms removed. The East Norfolk line leaves the Norfolk and Yarmouth; climbing a 1 in 80 bank for about a mile northwards from Whitlingham Junction.

Leaving the Yare valley, trains arrive at Salhouse station, 6 miles from Norwich, which retains two operational platforms, although the goods yard closed on 18 April 1966. The original ENR timber building on the down platform has been demolished, although the later GER building on the up platform survives.

The next station was reached after passing over the longest viaduct on the route, a 55-foot structure originally built using timber but rebuilt in the 1890s, over the River Bure. Wroxham was 8½ miles from Norwich. This was formerly the junction for the ENR branch line to Aylsham and County School, and also marks the limit of the double track section. The branch line formerly diverged from the Cromer line a short distance north of the station, but closed to all traffic in 1982 and was subsequently dismantled, replaced by the Bure Valley Railway. The station had coal and grain handling facilities in the yard north east of the station and, although this yard is no longer in use, the isolated tracks remain.

Worstead railway station, 13 miles from Norwich, is the next halt. Although originally equipped with two platforms, only one remains in use. The goods yard was closed on 13 July 1964, but the abolished signal box remains in situ as a shed and garage.

The next station, located 16 miles from Norwich, was formerly known as North Walsham Main railway station to distinguish it from North Walsham Town railway station on the rival Midland and Great Northern Joint Railway, but is now simply referred to as North Walsham. The station was also formerly used to serve trains working on the Norfolk and Suffolk Joint Railway route to Mundesley. The station is equipped with a passing loop, although the original station buildings and signal box have been demolished.

Leaving North Walsham, trains soon pass over the former Midland and Great Northern line to Melton Constable, now in use as part of the Weavers' Way long-distance footpath. Part of the Norfolk and Suffolk line to Mundesley has been used, along with part of the Midland and Great Northern line to Yarmouth, as the North Walsham bypass, which can be seen paralleling the route through the town.

The next station, 19 miles from Norwich, is at Gunton railway station. There is no village of this name, and the station is actually situated in the parish of Thorpe Market. Gunton Station was built primarily for the convenience of Lord Suffield (a major investor in the original East Norfolk Railway Company). Gunton's original station buildings are preserved but are no longer in the ownership of the railway.

The line climbs steeply away from Gunton station, with the original route into Cromer being abandoned by the modern railway approximately half a mile from the original terminus - at the site of the former Cromer Junction with the Norfolk and Suffolk Joint Railway.

The terminus of the line was Cromer High railway station, the first station opened in Cromer, situated to the south on the outskirts of the town on a steep escarpment. The station (along with the East Norfolk line) was incorporated into the Great Eastern Railway, who had operated the services from the beginning. It served as the terminus of Great Eastern Railway services from London and Norwich. Initially named "Cromer" on opening, it was renamed "Cromer High" in 1948.

The station opened on 26 March 1877. Because of steep gradients near the town, the station was built in open fields some distance from the town itself.

On 20 September 1954 passenger services ceased at Cromer High, with all traffic diverted to Cromer Beach (now renamed "Cromer"). The station remained open as a freight terminus until 7 March 1960, but was then closed completely and the station demolished.

=== Wroxham to County School ===
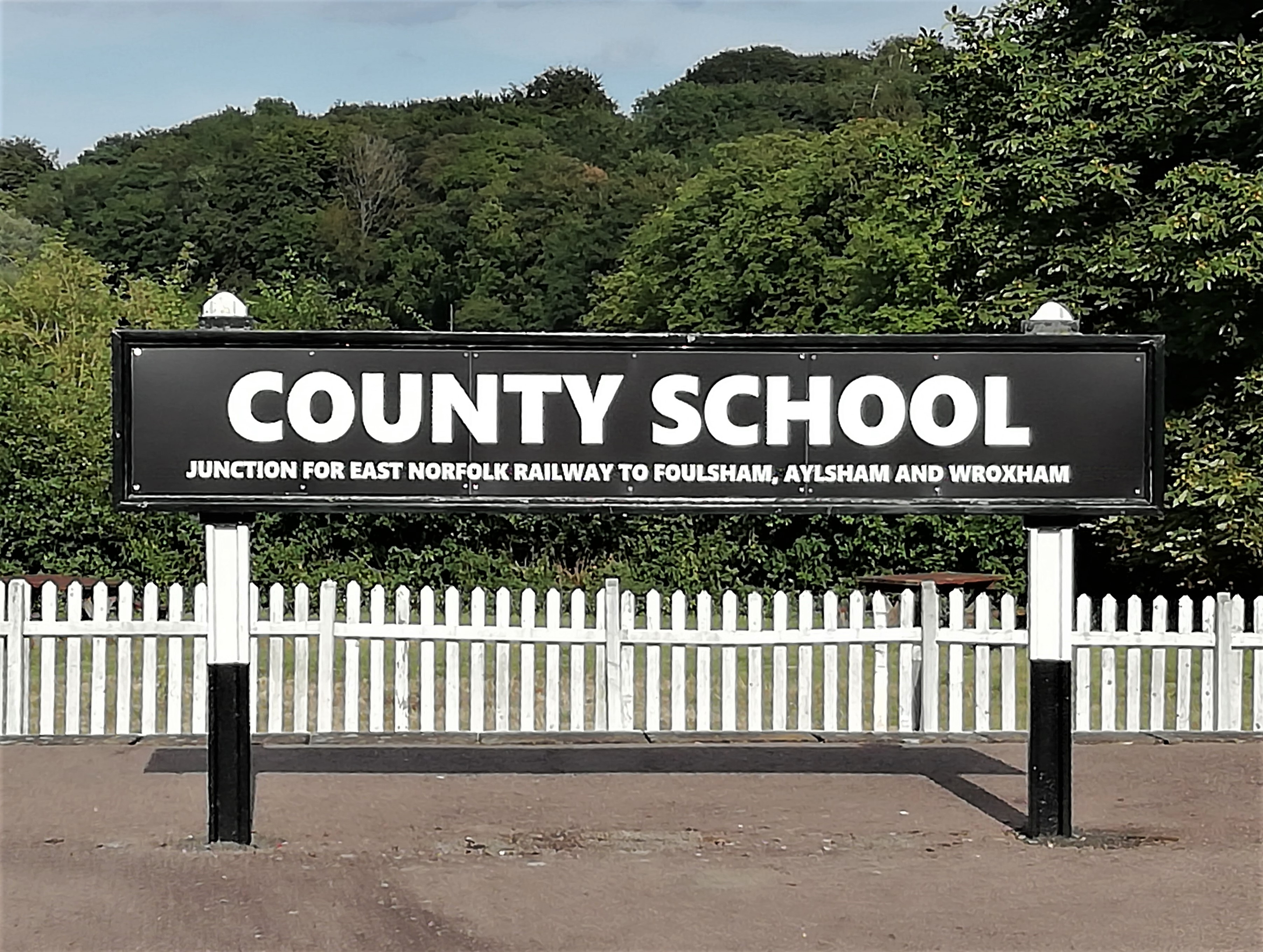
Replica junction board at County School, 2019

Postcard view of Foulsham station

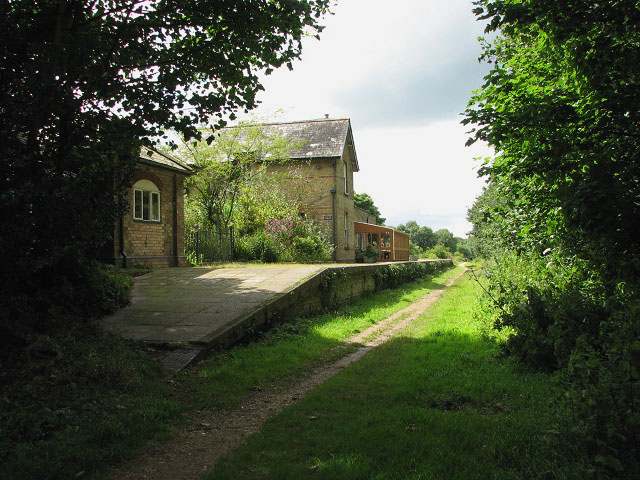
Reepham station in 2008

The ENR branch line to Aylsham and County School diverged westwards from the Cromer line just north of Wroxham station on a 10 chain radius curve. The "Western Extension" opened as far as Aylsham on 1 January 1880, with service reaching Cawston on 1 September. The line to Reepham was opened in 1881, at the same time as the East Norfolk Railway was amalgamated with the Great Eastern Railway. County School was opened as the junction with the former Norfolk Railway line from Norwich to Fakenham in 1882.

Passenger services over the line ended on 15 September 1952, with the line between Reepham and Foulsham also being closed to goods. This section was then partially relaid in 1960, with the Themelthorpe Curve goods link with the former Norwich line of the M&GN being opened 12 September. The remaining section of line between Foulsham and County School was closed on 31 October 1964. Buxton Lamas and Coltishall closed to goods on 18 April 1966. The line between Themelthorpe and Wroxham remained in use as a goods line until the 1980s.

The first station after Wroxham was at Coltishall, followed by Buxton railway station (Norfolk) and Aylsham. This section is still in use as the Bure Valley Railway. Although the passenger service ended in 1952, freight traffic continued until 1981 and the line through Aylsham was formally closed on 6 January 1982. A weed-killing train ran in 1983 and track-lifting trains ran the following year.. In 1990, the station buildings at Aylsham, then one of the most complete remaining Great Eastern stations in Norfolk, were obliterated to make way for the Bure Valley Railway whose headquarters now occupy the site.

Beyond Aylsham the route survives as part of the Marriott's Way long-distance footpath and cycleway. The next station was at Cawston, where the building survives as a private residence, although the formation and platforms have been buried. Cawston was the planned location of the junction for the proposed, but never built, branch line to the coast at Blakeney, with a triangle on the Aylsham side of the village being shown on plans.

The next station, Reepham also remains, along with its large goods shed and former yard, although a road improvement scheme in the town has partially blocked a section of the line. Although the tracks have been removed, the Whitwell and Reepham railway intend to restore railway services to this station.

Just west of Reepham is the Themelthorpe Curve, connecting the ENR to the Midland and Great Northern line to Norwich City railway station - one of the last sections of railway line to have been built in Norfolk. This also marks the point where the Marriott's Way leaves the formation.

West of Themelthorpe the ENR originally passed under the Midland and Great Northern, and the abutments of the bridge can still be seen. The line then continues to Foulsham. The section between Themelthorpe and Foulsham is the longest-closed section of the route, having been totally abolished in 1952. Although closed to passengers at this time, goods traffic on the section between Foulsham and County School until 31 October 1964.

The final section of embankment before Broom Green has been ploughed in, and few traces remain of the southern cord of the ENR triangle connecting with the MNR. The cutting forming the northern cord of the triangle, which was never laid with track, survives. From Broom Green shares the formation of former Wymondham, Dereham, Fakenham and Wells-next-the-Sea for the final mile to County School.

=== Cawston to Blakeney (proposed, but not built) ===
The East Norfolk Railway proposed a line from Cawston to Cley and Blakeney in 1879, with an intermediate station planned for Holt. It was estimated that this line would cost £300,000, but generate only £7 per mile per week – but the main intention of the line was block access by rival companies. The proposed line had very little local support, especially in Holt – where the station was in fact going to be located in Letheringsett rather than the named town.

== Present day operations ==
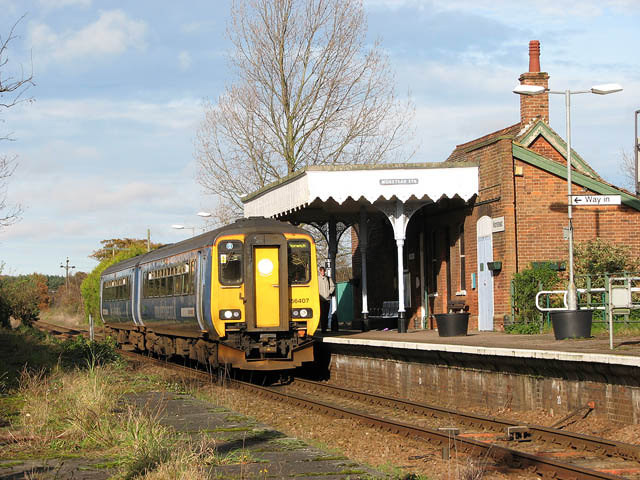
Bittern Line train at Worstead.

The main line remains in regular operation between Norwich and Cromer, with the exception of Cromer High railway station. Trains approaching Cromer use part of the formation of the Norfolk and Suffolk Joint Railway, before joining the former Midland & Great Northern Joint Railway (M&GN) at Cromer Beach railway station. It is presently marketed as the Bittern Line, and formed part of Network Rail Network Rail Route 7, as SRS 07.11 - East Suffolk line and Norfolk branches. Since 2010 it is a part of Strategic Route D: East Anglia.

The first 9 miles (14 kilometres) of the branch line, between Wroxham railway station and Aylsham railway station, operates as the Bure Valley Railway 15 in (381 mm) minimum gauge heritage railway.
