= Salhouse railway station =

Railway station in Norfolk, England

Coordinates: 52.6756°N 1.3915°E

Salhouse
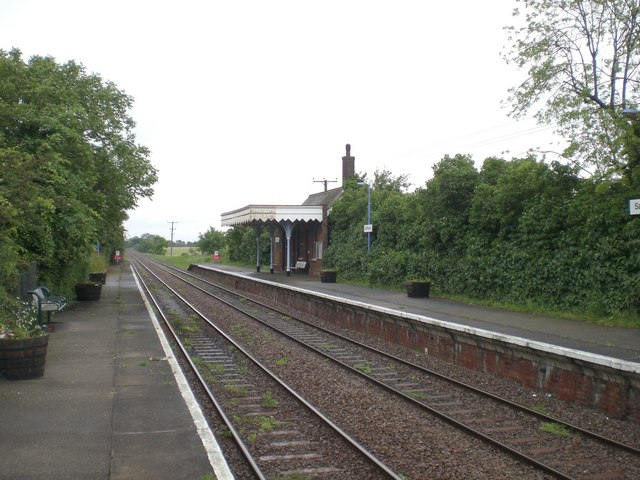

General information
- Location: Salhouse, Broadland; England
- Grid reference: TG293140
- Manager: Greater Anglia
- Platforms: 2

Other information
- Station code: SAH
- Classification: DfT category F2

Key dates
- 20 October 1874: Opened

Passengers
- 2021/22: ▲12,692
- 2022/23: ▲14,006
- 2023/24: ▼13,566
- 2024/25: ▲14,372
- 2025/26: ▲14,704
Location
Notes
- Passenger statistics from the Office of Rail and Road

Salhouse railway station is on the Bittern Line in Norfolk, England, serving the village of Salhouse. It is the next station along the line from Norwich, 5 miles 74 chains (9.5 km) away; the following station is Hoveton & Wroxham. Train services are operated by Greater Anglia.

== History ==
The station was opened on 20 October 1874 by the East Norfolk Railway.

The station, along with the rest of the line was listed for closure in 1967 as part of the Beeching cuts, but survived after the proposal was declined by the Secretary of State for Transport.

In 2021, Greater Anglia proposed demolishing the original station building and canopy, to replace it with an environmentally-friendly waiting shelter. The building has not been used for many years and has deteriorated over time. Despite this, the plan had several objections from local residents.

== Facilities ==
The station, along with most similarly rural stations in the area, only has basic facilities, including cycle storage, a small car park, benches and live departure screens. As there are no facilities to purchase tickets, passengers must buy one in advance, or from the guard on the train.

== Passenger volume ==
Passenger volume at Salhouse
| | 2004–05 | 2005–06 | 2006–07 | 2007–08 | 2008–09 | 2009–10 | 2010–11 | 2011–12 | 2012–13 | 2013–14 | 2014–15 | 2015–16 | 2016–17 | 2017–18 | 2018–19 | 2019–20 | 2020–21 | 2021–22 | 2022–23 | 2023–24 | 2024–25 |
|---|---|---|---|---|---|---|---|---|---|---|---|---|---|---|---|---|---|---|---|---|---|
| Entries and exits | 3,529 | 4,168 | 5,885 | 6,475 | 6,056 | 6,120 | 6,822 | 6,250 | 8,412 | 9,390 | 9,806 | 12,998 | 13,350 | 10,448 | 11,778 | 9,856 | 11,566 | 12,692 | 14,006 | 13,566 | 14,372 |

The statistics cover twelve month periods that start in April.

== Services ==
The typical off-peak service is one train every two hours in each direction between Norwich and Sheringham via Cromer. During the peak hours, the service is increased to one train per hour in each direction.

| Preceding station | National Rail | Following station |
|---|---|---|
| Norwich | Greater Anglia Bittern Line | Hoveton & Wroxham |
| | Historical railways | |
| Whitlingham Line open, station closed | Great Eastern Railway Wherry Lines | Hoveton & Wroxham Line and station open |

== Community rail ==
The station, along with the others between Norwich and Sheringham, is part of the Bittern Line Community Rail Partnership.

== Bibliography ==
- Quick, Michael (2023). Railway Passenger Stations in Great Britain: A Chronology (PDF) (5th ed.). London: Railway and Canal Historical Society.
