= Aylsham Bypass Tunnel =

Railway tunnel in Norfolk, England

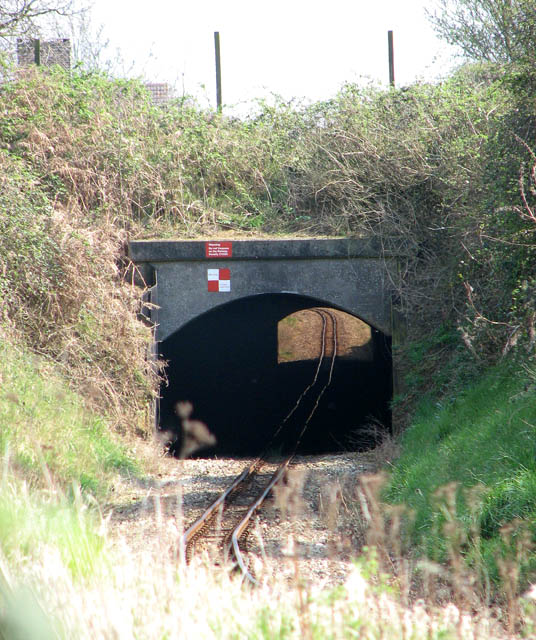
- Bure Valley Railway – Aylsham bypass tunnel
- Interactive map of Aylsham Bypass Tunnel

Overview
- Line: Bure Valley Railway
- Location: Aylsham
- Coordinates: 52.789740°N 1.261948°E
- Status: operational

Technical
- Track gauge: 15 in (381 mm)

The Aylsham Bypass Tunnel is the only railway tunnel in Norfolk, England currently open to trains. It carries the narrow gauge Bure Valley Railway under the Aylsham Bypass. The former Norfolk & Suffolk Joint Railway's Cromer Tunnel at Cromer is disused.

The original East Norfolk Railway crossed Bure Valley Lane at this point, by means of a level crossing, but the combination of heavy traffic and small steam trains is not encouraged in modern transport policies.

== See also ==
- Tunnels in the United Kingdom
