= Cawston railway station =

Former railway station in England

Coordinates: 52.77324°N 1.16070°E

Cawston
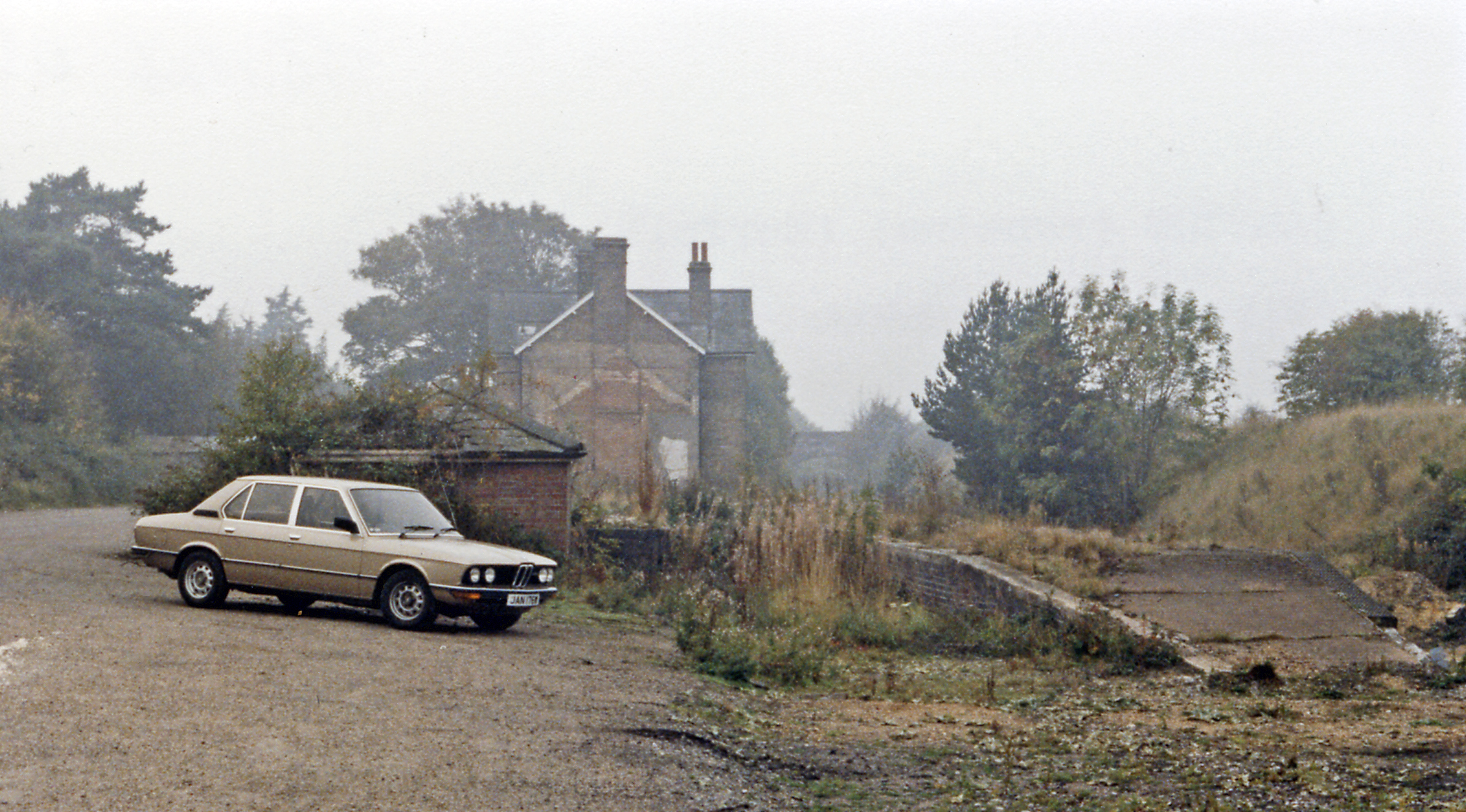
- Remains of the station in 1986

General information
- Location: Cawston, Broadland, Norfolk; England
- Grid reference: TG133242
- Platforms: 1

Other information
- Status: Disused

History
- Pre-grouping: East Norfolk Railway; Great Eastern Railway
- Post-grouping: London & North Eastern Railway; Eastern Region of British Railways

Key dates
- 1 September 1880: Opened
- 15 September 1952: Closed to passengers
- 31 October 1966: Closed to freight
Location

Cawston was a railway station in Cawston, Norfolk. It was part of the Great Eastern Railway network for a large portion of its existence. It was on the line between County School and Aylsham. It closed in 1952, the station building is now a private residence. It can be seen from the Marriott's Way footpath.

Preceding station	Disused railways	Following station
Reepham; Line and station closed	Great Eastern	Aylsham South; Line and station closed
