= Aylsham South railway station =

Former railway station in Norfolk, England

Coordinates: 52.79050°N 1.25393°E

Aylsham South
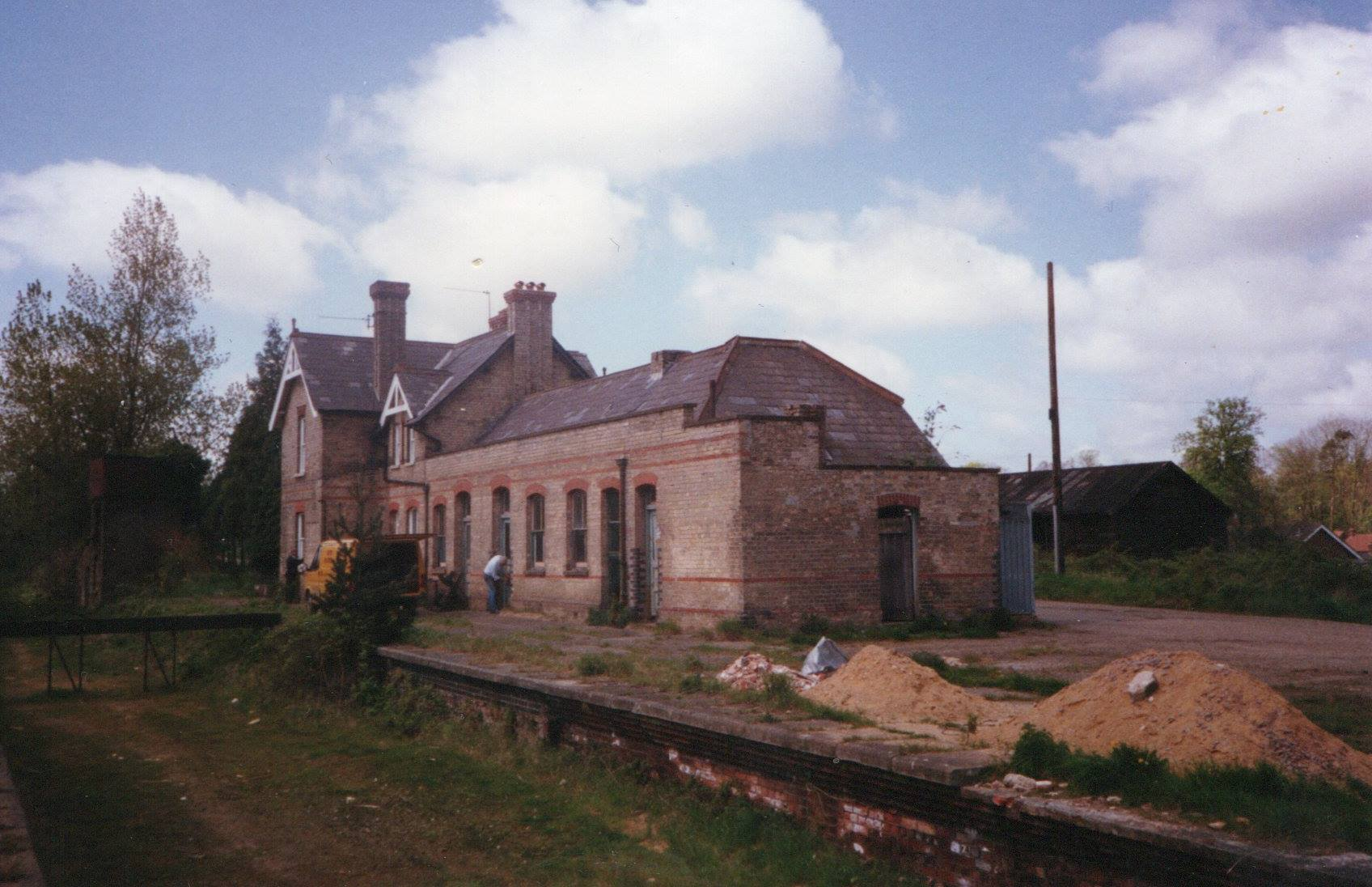
- Aylsham South station in 1990, shortly before demolition.

General information
- Location: Aylsham, Broadland; England
- Grid reference: TG195264
- Platforms: 2

Other information
- Status: Disused

History
- Pre-grouping: Great Eastern Railway
- Post-grouping: London and North Eastern Railway; Eastern Region of British Railways

Key dates
- 1 January 1880: Opened as Aylsham
- 27 September 1948: Renamed Aylsham South
- 15 September 1952: Closed to passengers
- 1 March 1977: Closed to freight
- 10 July 1990: Aylsham railway station (BVR) opened on same site
Location

Aylsham South railway station served the town of Aylsham in Norfolk from 1880 to 1981. The period station buildings were subsequently demolished in 1990 to allow for the construction of Aylsham railway station, the northern terminus of the Bure Valley Railway, a narrow gauge operation which reuses some of the trackbed of the old railway line.

== History ==
Opened by the East Norfolk Railway, then run by the Great Eastern Railway, it became part of the London and North Eastern Railway during the Grouping of 1923. The station then passed on to the Eastern Region of British Railways on nationalisation in 1948.

Passenger services were withdrawn in 1952, but freight services continued until 1977. In 1990, the station buildings, then one of the most complete remaining Great Eastern stations in Norfolk, were demolished to make way for the Bure Valley Railway whose headquarters now occupy the site.

Preceding station	Disused railways	Following station
Cawston; Line and station closed	Great Eastern	Buxton Lamas; Line and station closed

== External sources ==
- Station on navigable O.S. map
- Bure Valley Railway website
- Friends of the Bure Valley Railway website
