= Cawston, Norfolk =

Village and civil parish in England

Coordinates: 52.770°N 1.165°E

Cawston
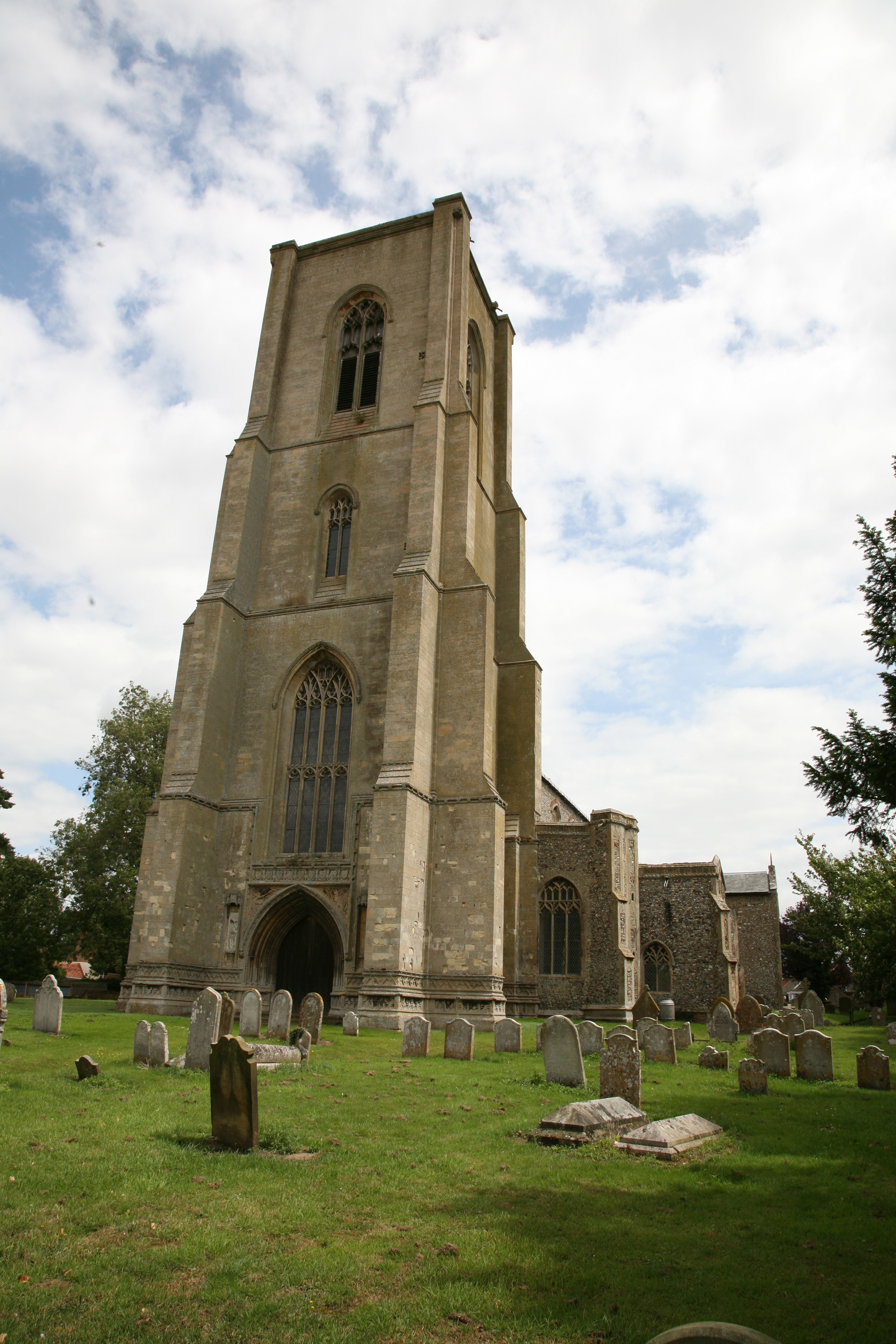
- St. Agnes' Church

- Location within Norfolk
- Area: 17.02 km^{2} (6.57 sq mi)
- Population: 1,613 (2021 census)
  - Density: 95/km^{2} (250/sq mi)
- OS grid reference: TG136239
- Civil parish: Cawston
- District: Broadland
- Shire county: Norfolk
- Region: East
- Country: England
- Sovereign state: United Kingdom
- Post town: NORWICH
- Postcode district: NR10
- Dialling code: 01603
- Police: Norfolk
- Fire: Norfolk
- Ambulance: East of England
- UK Parliament: Mid Norfolk

Cawston is a village and civil parish in the English county of Norfolk.

Cawston is located three miles south-west of Aylsham and nine miles north of Norwich.

== History ==
Cawston's name is of combined Anglo-Saxon and Viking origin and derives from the Old English for a Viking named Kalfr's settlement.

In the Domesday Book of 1086, Cawston was recorded as being a settlement of 26 households in the hundred of South Erpingham. In 1086, the village was divided between the estates of King William I and William de Warenne.

Cawston was the scene of Norfolk's last duel, which occurred illegally in August 1698 between Sir Henry Hobart of Blickling Hall and Oliver Le Neve of Great Witchingham. The duel was fought with swords and ended with the fatal wounding of Hobart, resulting in Le Neve fleeing to the Netherlands. Today, a memorial stone to the duel is maintained by the National Trust.

During the Second World War, part of Cawston Parish fell within the grounds of RAF Oulton, a satellite airfield of RAF Horsham St Faith. After the war, most of the airfield was returned to agricultural use with most of the runways being broken-up to be used for the construction of the A140.

== Geography ==
According to the 2021 census, Cawston has a population of 1,613 people which shows a slight decrease from the 1,640 people recorded in the 2011 census.

Cawston is located at the junction between the B1145, between King's Lynn and Mundesley, and the B1149, between Holt and Norwich.

Cawston Railway Station opened in 1880 as part of the Great Eastern Railway and closed in 1952 due to declining passenger numbers. The station building is now a private residence.

== St. Agnes' Church ==
Cawston's parish church is dedicated to Saint Agnes and dates from the Fifteenth Century, being built at the request of Michael de la Pole, Earl of Suffolk, the Lord of the Manor. St. Agnes' is located on Church Lane and has been Grade I listed since 1961.

St. Agnes' boasts a painted rood screen, depicting twenty figures in all, which has been called one of the best in Norfolk as well as good examples of Medieval stained-glass windows and a hammerbeam roof, embellished with life-size carved wooden angels.

== Amenities ==
Local children attend Cawston Church of England Primary School which moved into its current building in 1953. The school was awarded a 'Good' rating by Ofsted in 2016.

== Notable residents ==
- Matthew Fletcher- British fundraiser and student.

== Governance ==
Cawston is part of the electoral ward of Eynesford for local elections and is part of the district of Broadland.

The village's national constituency is Mid Norfolk which has been represented by the Conservative George Freeman MP since 2010.

== War memorial ==
Cawston's war memorial is located in Cawston Cemetery and is a Medieval-style cross. The memorial was first erected in 1920 and was funded by the Parish Council and the local branch of the Royal British Legion. Curiously, the memorial was rebuilt in 2001 after being struck by lightning in 1999. The memorial lists the following names for the First World War:

Rank	Name	Unit	Date of death	Burial
Lt.	P. A. A. Enright DFC	No. 22 Squadron RAF	2 Nov. 1918	Doiran Memorial
2Lt.	Anthony B. Enright	17th Bde., Royal Field Artillery	11 May 1917	Étaples Military Cemetery
Sgt.	William Casson	2nd Bn., Manchester Regiment	19 Jun. 1918	St. Sever Cemetery
Cpl.	Robert T Tuddenham	16th The Queen's Lancers	20 May 1915	Menin Gate
Cpl.	W. H. Riseborough	11th Bn., Lancashire Fusiliers	10 Apr. 1918	Cabaret-Rouge Cemetery
LCpl.	Victor J. R. Hewitt	7th Bn., Leinster Regiment	1 Feb. 1917	Pond Farm Cemetery
LCpl.	Elijah Bartle	7th Bn., Lincolnshire Regiment	22 Mar. 1918	Arras Memorial
LCpl.	Clifford W. Lilly	7th Bn., Norfolk Regiment	3 Jul. 1916	Thiepval Memorial
LCpl.	Stanley H. Hill	8th Bn., Norfolk Regiment	21 Oct. 1916	Regina Trench Cemetery
LCpl.	Fred W. Riseborough	1/5th Bn., Northumberland Fusilers	14 Nov. 1916	Warlencourt Cemetery
Gnr.	Robert O. King	45th Bde., Royal Field Artillery	10 Nov. 1916	Thiepval Memorial
Pte.	Frederick Wells	4th Bn., Bedfordshire Regiment	29 Apr. 1917	Arras Memorial
Pte.	Claud F. Shreeve	1st Bn., The Buffs	15 Sep. 1916	Guillemont Rd. Cemetery
Pte.	William J. Bellboddy	116th (Ontario County) Bn., C.E.F.	29 Sep. 1918	Sainte-Olle Cemetery
Pte.	Arthur D. Keeler	1st Bn., Coldstream Guards	15 Sep. 1916	Guards Cemetery
Pte.	Fred G. Tuddenham	1/6th Bn., Durham Light Infantry	5 Nov. 1916	Thiepval Memorial
Pte.	Ernest H. Dix	3rd Bn., Royal Fusiliers	4 Oct. 1918	Prospect Hill Cemetery
Pte.	George Wells	7th Bn., King's Shropshire L. I.	18 Apr. 1918	Tourcoing Cemetery
Pte.	Peter E. Burke	Western Comm., Labour Corps	16 Jul. 1918	Cawston Cemetery
Pte.	Frederick Sampson	28th Bn., Middlesex Regiment	17 May 1916	Cawston Cemetery
Pte.	Dennis H. Douglas	8th Bn., Norfolk Regiment	11 Aug. 1917	Menin Gate
Pte.	Walter A. Barker	9th Bn., Norfolk Regt.	18 Oct. 1916	Bancourt British Cemetery
Pte.	George D. Douglas	9th Bn., Norfolk Regt.	15 Sep. 1916	Thiepval Memorial
Pte.	Percy Bryant	10th Bn., Norfolk Regt.	22 Nov. 1918	Cawston Cemetery
Pte.	Ernest Office	1st Bn., Northumberland Fusilers	26 Oct. 1914	Le Touret Memorial
Pte.	George Carman	1st Bn., Queen's Royal Regiment	3 Nov. 1916	Thiepval Memorial
Pte.	Alfred Betts	6th Bn., Queen's Regt.	23 Aug. 1918	Méaulte British Cemetery
Pte.	Thomas Sampson	14th Bn., York & Lancaster Regiment	9 May 1917	Arras Memorial
Rfn.	Lewis Tubby	1st Bn., Rifle Brigade	5 May 1918	Loos Memorial
Spr.	Thomas Betts	207th (Field) Coy., Royal Engineers	10 Oct. 1917	Tyne Cot

And: Harold Hampson-Jones, Arthur F. C. Rump and Ralph V. Shreeve. As well as the following for the Second World War:

Rank	Name	Unit	Date of death	Burial
FO	Leonard A. Barham	No. 199 Squadron RAF	25 Sep. 1944	Cawston Cemetery
Sgt.	Charles G. M. Ogilvie	No. 214 Squadron RAF	16 Nov. 1944	Cawston Cemetery
AS	Stanley F. Gaskin	HMS Cornwall	5 Apr. 1942	Chatham Naval Memorial
LCpl.	Eric G. Monsey	1st Bn., East Surrey Regiment	23 Apr. 1945	Argenta Gap War Cemetery
