= Wroxham railway station =

Railway station in Norfolk, England

Wroxham
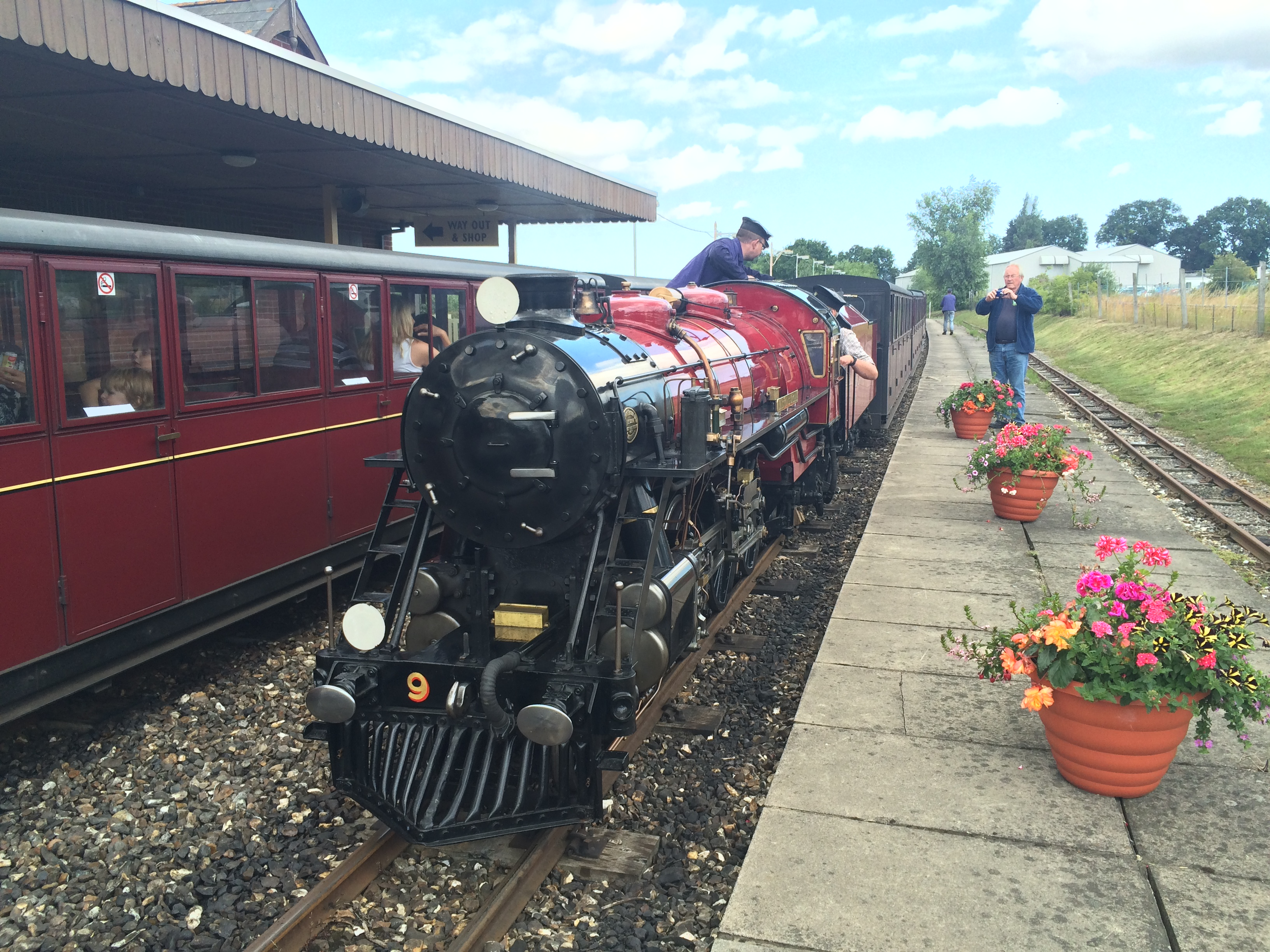
- 2015, with a service train on platform 1 and a special train (with visiting locomotive) at the former island platform (now demolished).

General information
- Location: Wroxham / Hoveton, Broadland, Norfolk; England
- Coordinates: 52.7168°N 1.4084°E
- System: Station on heritage railway
- Manager: BVR
- Platforms: 2

Key dates
- 10 July 1990: Opened
Location

Wroxham railway station is located near the villages of Wroxham and Hoveton in Norfolk, and is the southern terminus of the Bure Valley Railway, a minimum gauge operation which reuses some of the trackbed of a former standard gauge branch line. The station is close to Hoveton & Wroxham railway station on the standard gauge National Rail network, and the two are connected by a footpath.

== History ==
The station opened on 10 July 1990, with two platforms. In 2000 a long siding was installed, forming a third operational platform, but without locomotive release facilities.

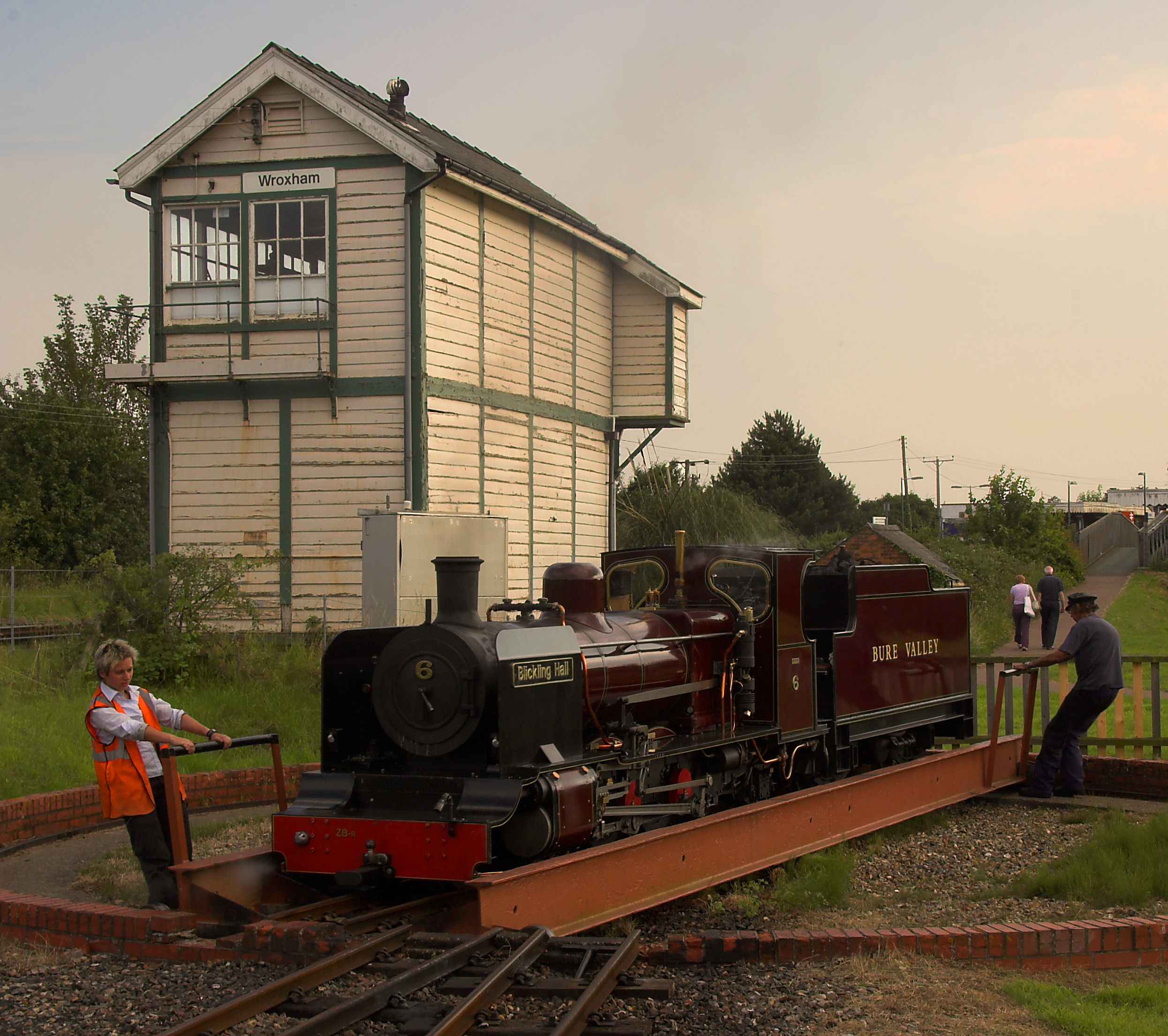
Locomotive Blickling Hall on the turntable.

Until December 2015 the station had three platforms. The main station buildings are located on platform 1. Until reordering, platforms 2 and 3 were the two sides of an island platform installation, although both were used only infrequently, with the regular timetable usually seeing no more than one service train in the station. The platform 2 line was also used as a locomotive release road and run-round loop. The platform 3 line was used for stabling of engineering trains, when engineers were working locally. The platform 1 and 2 lines were both connected to a turntable, which formed the headshunt and turning facility for the station.

== Facilities ==
In December 2015 the island platform was demolished and significant civil engineering work commenced. By mid January 2016 the station had been remodelled with two platforms and a central locomotive release road, all three tracks being directly connected to the turntable. The existing platform 1 was retained, and a brand new platform 2 installed, of superior quality to the previous island platform. At the same time, two crew rooms were constructed on the new platform 2, one serving as a lamp room, the other supporting a large new water tank, feeding two water cranes, one adjacent to the platform end of each of the two platforms. The turntable was also renovated and partially rebuilt.

The station buildings contain a shop (for souvenirs and refreshments), a booking office, and toilets. A very substantial wooden building has been set up beside the station by the supporters association, the Friends of the Bure Valley Railway, and contains a fundraising charity bookshop. There is a car park.

Preceding station	Heritage railways	Following station
Coltishall towards Aylsham	Bure Valley Railway	Terminus
National Rail
Interchange with Hoveton & Wroxham on the Bittern Line

== External sources ==
- Bure Valley Railway website
- Friends of the Bure Valley Railway website
