= Aylsham railway station =

Railway station in Norfolk, England

Aylsham
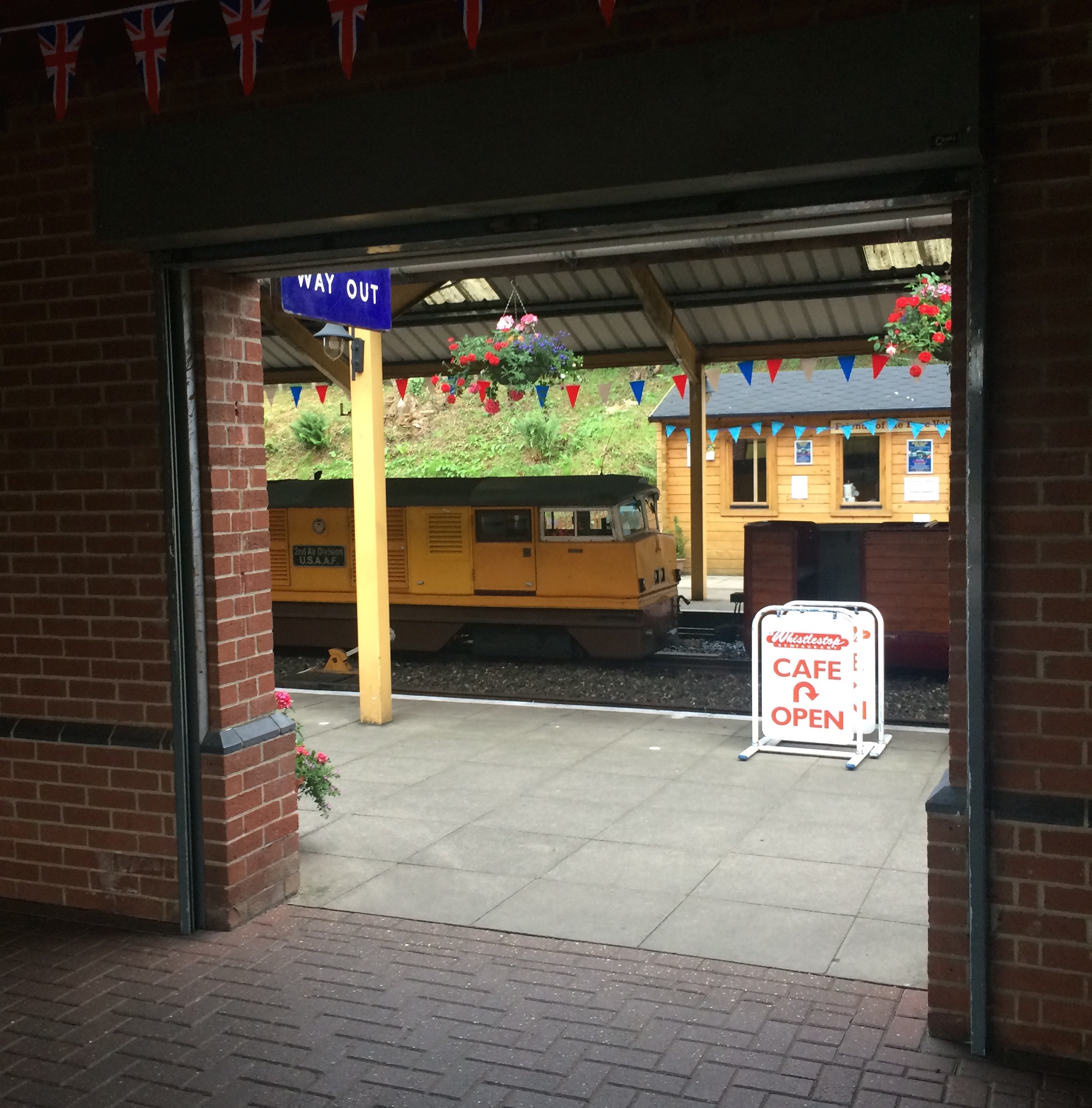
- Main entrance to Aylsham railway station.

General information
- Location: Aylsham, Broadland, Norfolk; England
- Coordinates: 52.79050°N 1.25393°E
- Grid reference: TR153347
- System: Station on heritage railway
- Manager: BVR
- Platforms: 3 open (originally 4)

Key dates
- 10 July 1990: Opened
Location

Aylsham railway station is located in the town of Aylsham in Norfolk and is the northern terminus of the Bure Valley Railway, a narrow gauge operation which reuses some of the trackbed of a former standard gauge branch line that closed in 1977. The station occupies the same site as the former Aylsham South railway station, which served the town between 1880 and 1952.

== History ==
Aylsham South railway station, which first occupied this site, opened in 1880. It was operated by the East Norfolk Railway, then the Great Eastern Railway, and became part of the London and North Eastern Railway during the Grouping of 1923. The station passed into the Eastern Region of British Railways on nationalisation in 1948.

In 1952, the passenger service ended and the freight service was subsequently discontinued in 1977. The fine period station buildings stood after closure until 1990, when the Bure Valley Railway opened. Upon taking over the site, the original buildings were deemed unsuitable for the new project and were demolished. The new Aylsham railway station was constructed on the site and opened on 10 July 1990.

== Facilities ==
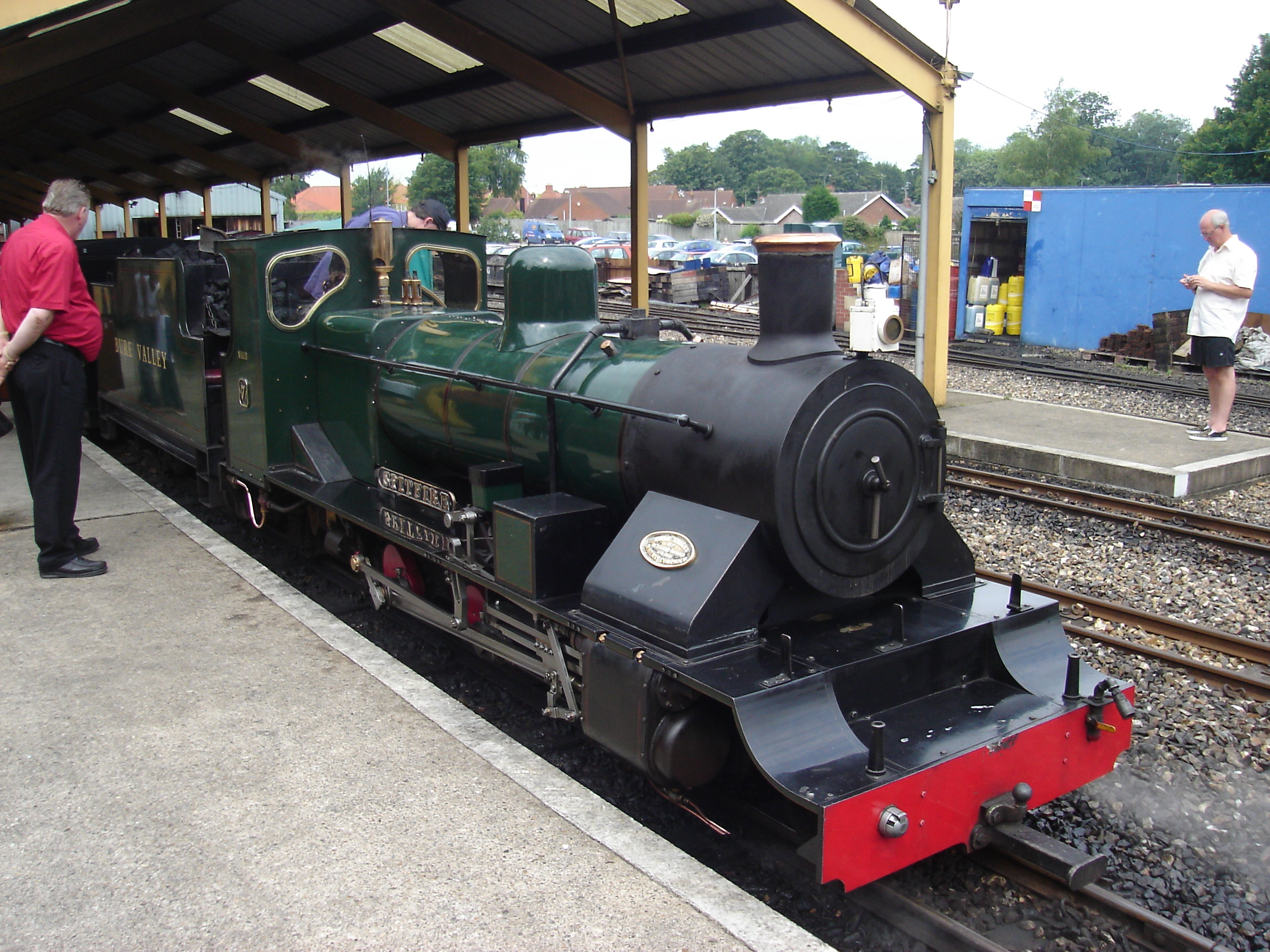
A train prepares to depart from platform 2 at Aylsham railway station.

The station has three platforms. Platform 3 sees only occasional passenger use, but is used for stock storage. Platforms 1 and 2 are in regular use; both are linked to a central locomotive release road. These two platforms and the central release road are all supplied with terminal headshunts, all of which are linked via a complex tri-directional set of points. Platforms 1 and 2, and the release road, are all protected by an overall station roof. These platforms were originally numbered 2, 3 and 4, but were renumbered as 1, 2 and 3, as the original platform 1 had been subsumed into the new Aylsham locomotive depot.

The modern station buildings contain a cafeteria, booking office, staff room, shop, administrative offices, toilets and entrance foyer. Additionally, a substantial wooden building has been set up on platform 3 by the supporters association, the Friends of the Bure Valley Railway. There is a large car park.

Alongside the station is the railway's Aylsham Locomotive Depot, a large three-track engine shed, capable of housing all the railway's locomotives. Behind the locomotive depot is the railway's main engineering workshop, equipped to carry out running repairs or full-scale locomotive overhauls. This facility also contains locker rooms, wash rooms and administrative offices for the railway's engineers.

The operating facilities of the station also include a turntable, several sidings (used primarily for engineering vehicles) and facilities for fuelling and watering locomotives. There is a signal box, which contains the main line control centre, from which computerised control and radio communication are used to operate the block section system of train control.

Preceding station	Heritage railways	Following station
Terminus	Bure Valley Railway	Brampton towards Wroxham

== External sources ==
- Station on navigable O.S. map
- Bure Valley Railway website
- Friends of the Bure Valley Railway website
