= Bure Valley Railway =

Narrow-gauge railway in Norfolk, England

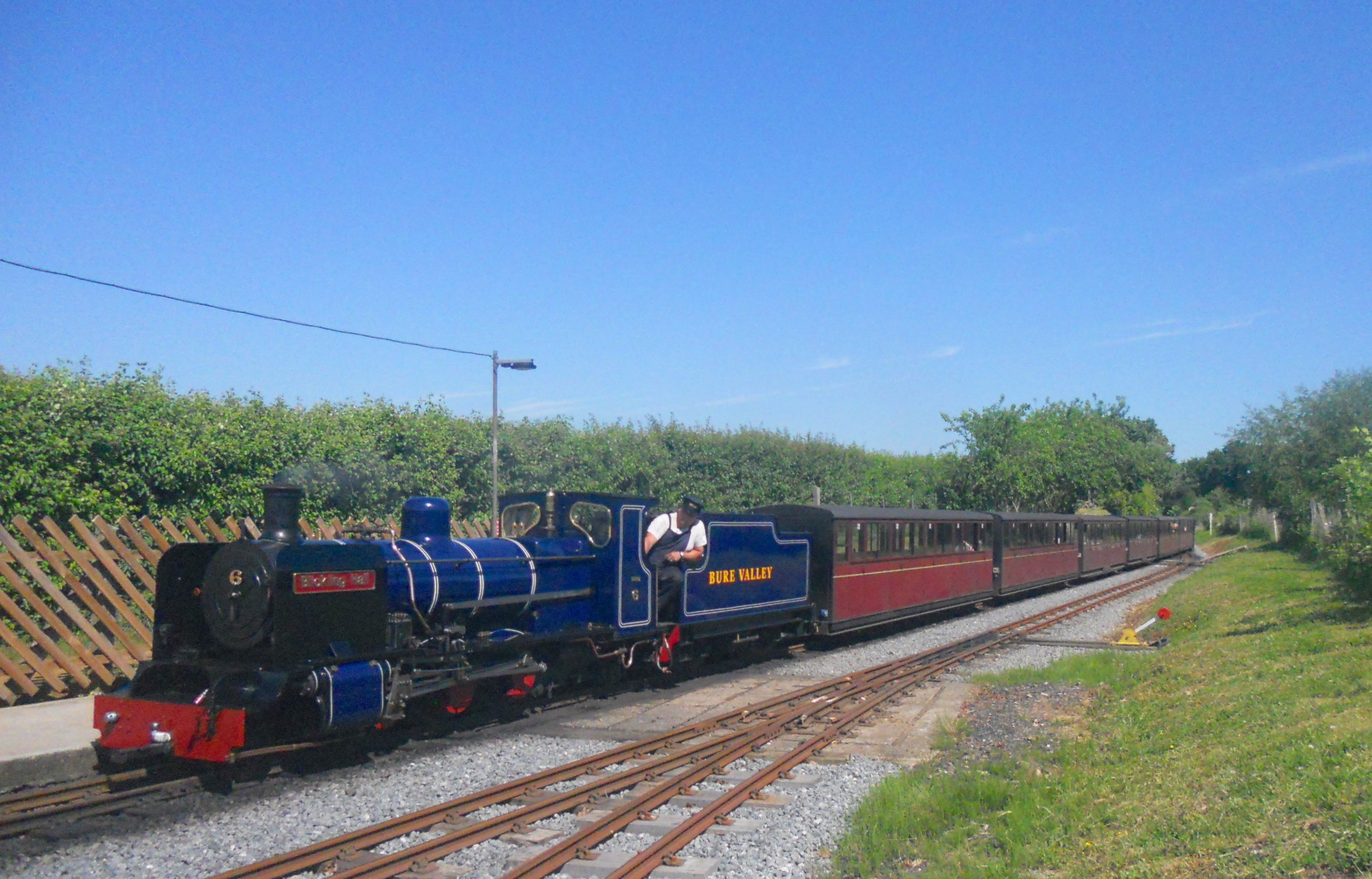
- Loco No. 6 'Blickling Hall' and its train arrive at Wroxham
- Locale: Wroxham; 52.7168°N 1.4084°E
- Terminus: Aylsham; 52.7911°N 1.2548°E

Commercial operations
- Name: East Norfolk Railway
- Original gauge: 4 ft 8 1/2 in (1,435 mm) standard gauge

Preserved operations
- Operated by: Bure Valley Railway
- Stations: 5
- Length: 9 mi (14.5 km)
- Preserved gauge: 15 in (381 mm)

Commercial history
- Opened: 1880
- Closed to passengers: 15 September 1952
- Closed: 6 January 1982

Preservation history
- 10 July 1990: opened

The Bure Valley Railway is a 15 in (381 mm) minimum gauge visitors' attraction in Norfolk, England. It was created on the original disused trackbed of a standard gauge railway to incorporate a new, adjacent pedestrian footpath.

The railway runs from Wroxham to Aylsham (9 miles or 14.5 kilometres) and is Norfolk's second longest heritage railway. It uses both steam and diesel locomotives but has recently purchased a Battery Electric Locomotive to join the fleet. There are intermediate halts at Brampton, Buxton and Coltishall. There are 17 bridges, including a 105-foot (32 m)-long girder bridge over the River Bure in Buxton with Lammas, and the Aylsham Bypass Tunnel under the A140 at Aylsham.

The railway is listed as exempt from the UK Railways (Interoperability) Regulations 2000.

== History ==
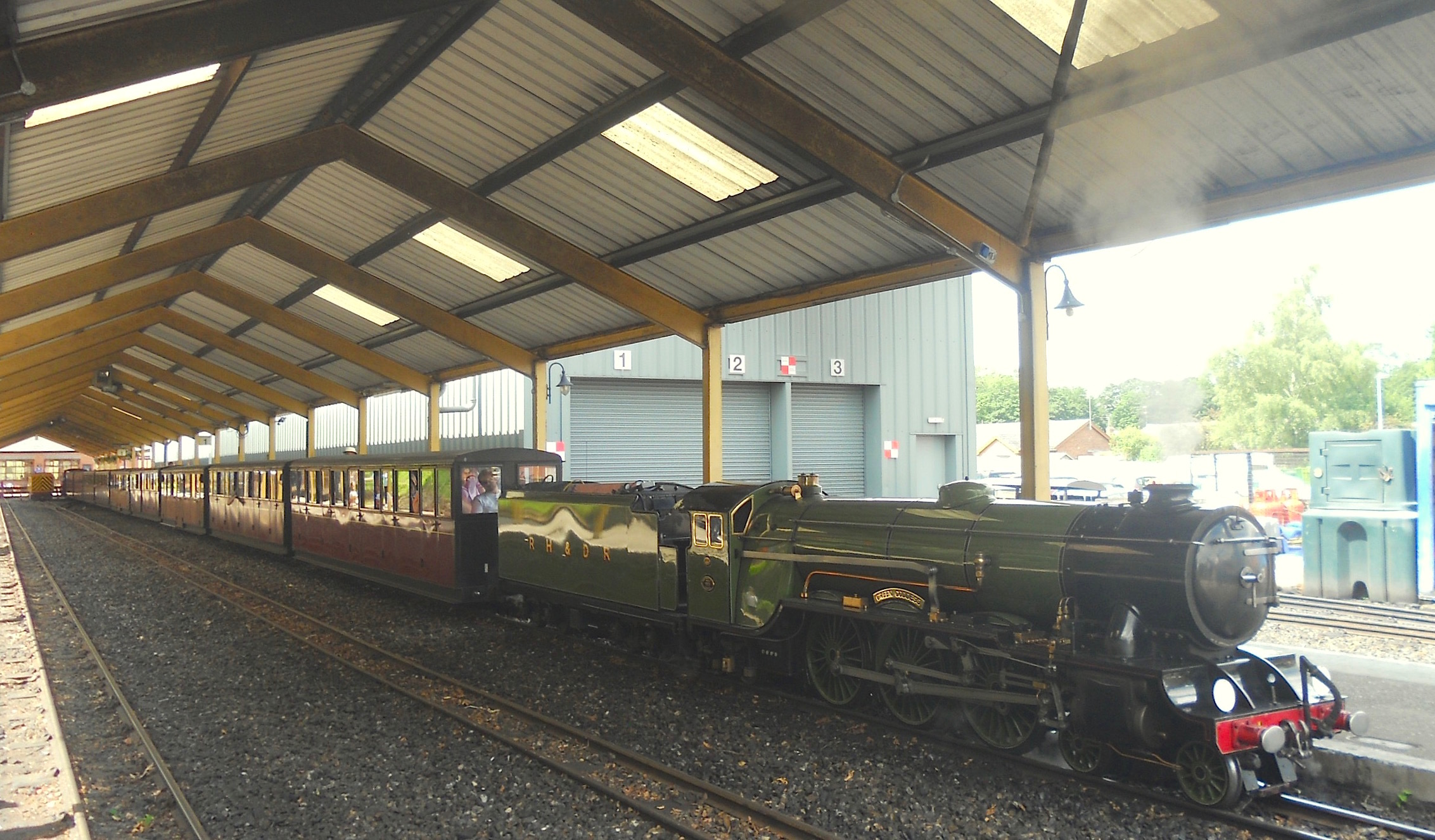
Aylsham station's large train shed, with visiting RHDR No. 1 'Green Goddess'.

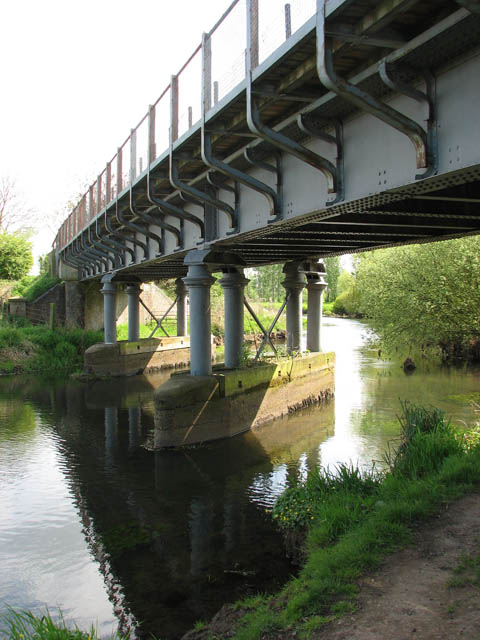
This girder bridge takes the Bure Valley Railway over the River Bure. The bridge is 105 feet long and by far the largest bridge on the line.

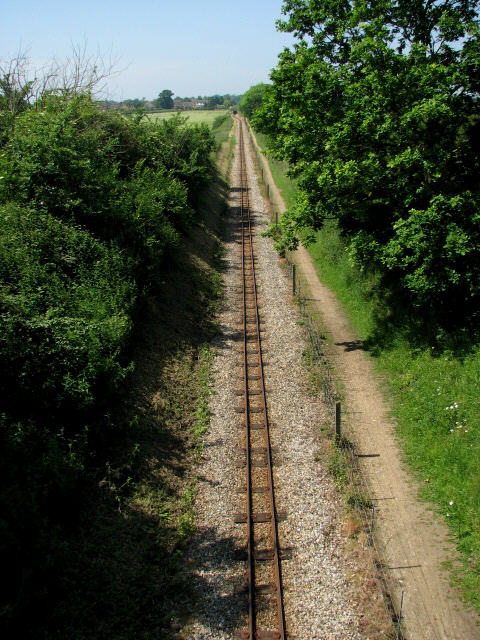
Bure Valley Railway track approaching Aylsham, showing how the formation is split between the railway and permissive footpath.

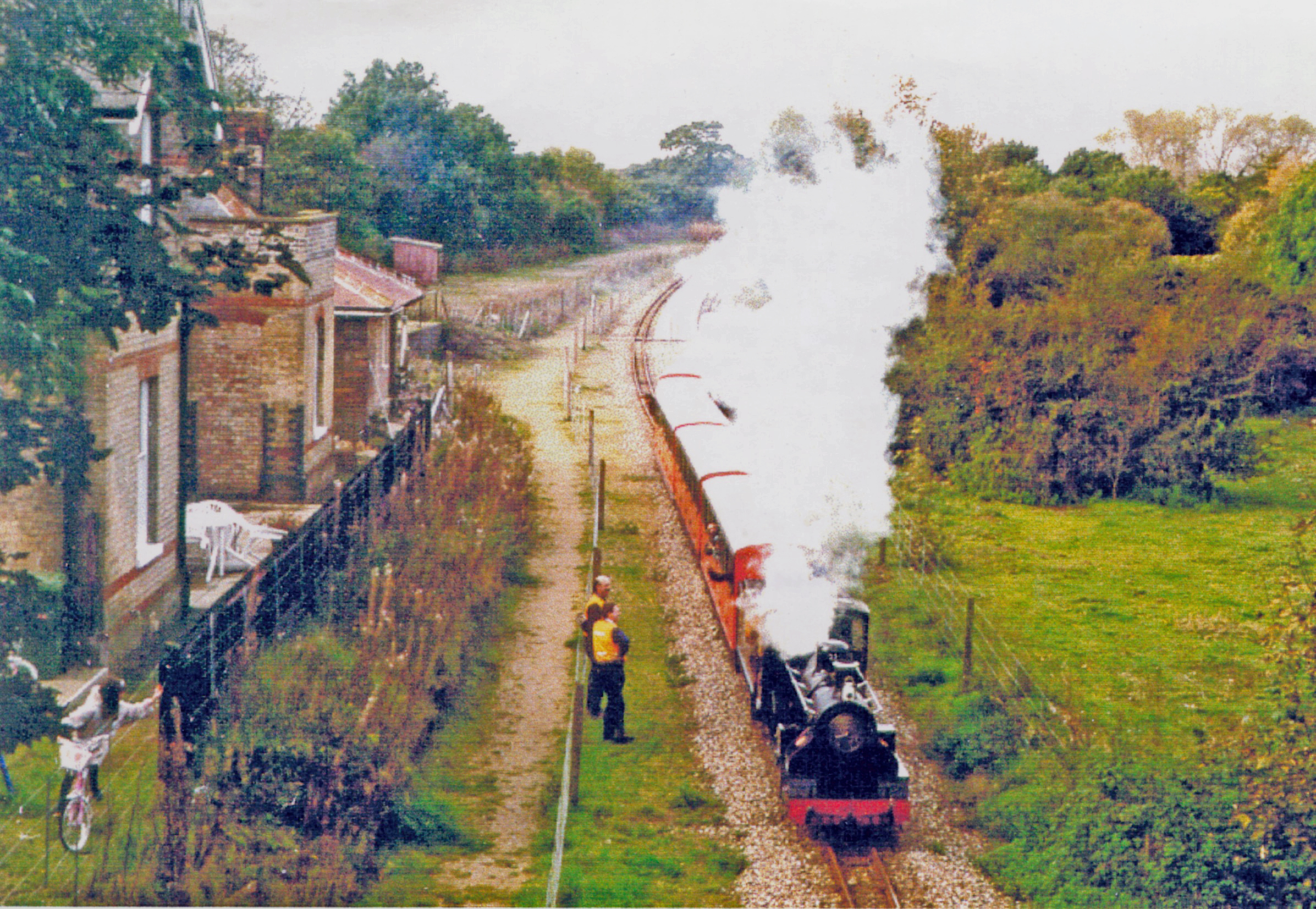
Bure Valley train at Coltishall, 1994.

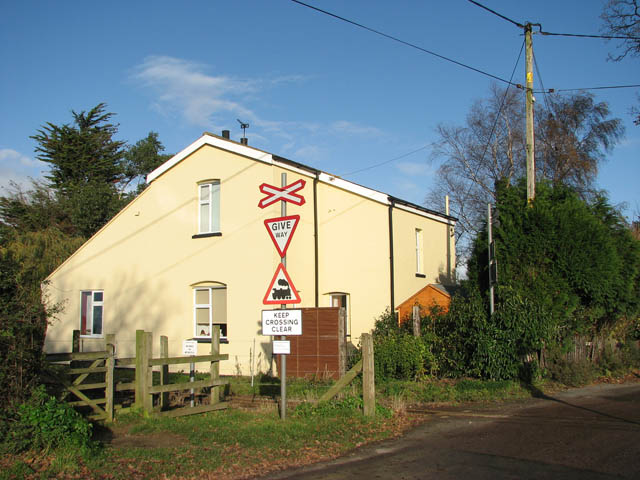
Belaugh Green, one of the unprotected, open level crossings on the line.

=== Construction and operation ===
The railway is built on part of the trackbed of the East Norfolk Railway (ENR). The ENR started in 1877 when the East Norfolk Railway opened from Norwich to Cromer, with an extension from Wroxham to Aylsham in 1880. The western extension was planned by Edward Wilson & Co. in 1876, with the line being constructed by William Waddell at a cost of £44,000, initially employing 100 men, 10 horses and 43 waggons.

The ENR was taken over by the Great Eastern Railway in 1882, although they had always held a controlling interest in the company, with the GER completing the line's extension to County School on the Norfolk Railway's line. The GER was amalgamated into the London & North Eastern Railway in 1923, and the railway was nationalised in 1948.

On 15 September 1952 the passenger service stopped, and the line between Foulsham and Reepham was closed to all traffic, but the freight service continued on the remainder of the line. Buxton Lamas, as it was then known, closed for goods in 1964, and Aylsham and Coltishall in 1974.

Freight trains continued to run over the line after this for two principal sources of traffic. From September 1960, the line west of Aylsham via Cawston and Reepham, which originally went to the junction at County School Station, instead turned south via a new curve at Themelthorpe to join a fragment of the old Midland and Great Northern system to reach Lenwade and Norwich City.

Coal traffic continued to be carried from Norwich Thorpe via Aylsham to Norwich City There was also regular traffic from Lenwade in the form of concrete building components.

This traffic ended in 1981 and the line through Aylsham formally closed on 6 January 1982. A weed-killing train ran in 1983 and track-lifting trains ran the following year.

=== Reopening ===
The trackbed was purchased by Broadland District Council, initially with plans to develop it as a long-distance footpath. In 1986, however, the idea of using part of the closed line as an operational railway was considered. Equipment and experience of railway operation came from Robert Hudson and John Edwards, who supplied railway equipment to Pleasurewood Hills, with Pleasureworld, under Chairman Joe Larter, providing tourism experience. Graham Fowler, of Broadland District Council, was later appointed the first General Manager. Grants from the English Tourist Board and Department of the Environment helped launch the £2.5 million scheme.

Forty three objections to the restoration of the line were made to the light railway order, for the following reasons:

- the appearance of the railway in the landscape;
- the possible effect on property values;
- possible congestion in Aylsham, including access to/from the station;
- the width of the footpath adjacent to the railway,
- the security of the fence separating it from the railway;
- possible noise from premises at Aylsham Station associated with sheet metal working.

Many of these issues were resolved by conducting a comparative study between the proposed Bure Valley Railway and the established Romney, Hythe and Dymchurch Railway, with various mitigations required of the new company. Consent was given for the rebuilding of the line in 1987, despite local objections and with complaints from residents of Buxton with Lamas initially seeing plans for a restored station in the village dropped.

Track relaying, using 30-foot section flat-bottom steel rail (BS 30 m) secured by Pandrol clips, was well-underway in September 1989, with 1 1/2 miles (2.4 km) of the track relaid and claims that the new railway would create about 60 jobs. In 1990, the station buildings at Aylsham, one of the most complete remaining Great Eastern station complexes in Norfolk, were demolished to make way for the new Bure Valley Railway headquarters. Construction of the line created the Aylsham Bypass Tunnel, Norfolk's only operational railway tunnel, which carries the railway under the Aylsham Bypass replacing the original standard gauge level crossing. Cromer Tunnel in Cromer, the only other surviving railway tunnel in the county, is disused.

The Bure Valley Railway opened on 10 July 1990 under the management of RKF Leisure which had purchased the trackbed. The opening ceremony saw a series of issues, including overloading of the first train, causing it to stall at Coltishall for 30 minutes with defective brakes.

=== Receivership and rescue by Broadland District Council ===
When the RKF's parent company, RKF Group plc, went into receivership in January 1991, Broadland District Council moved quickly to acquire the line from the receivers as it feared that property developers might seize the opportunity to take control of the land. Agreement was reached with Ffestiniog Railway director Mike Hart to set up a new company, Bure Valley Railway (1991) Ltd, to lease and operate the line. A long distance footpath (rail trail) opened alongside it in 1991.

In 1993 Mike Hart sold his interest in Bure Valley Railway (1991) Limited to Robert Baker of Sudbury, Suffolk. In 1995 control passed to Westernasset Limited. In 2001 control of Westernasset was acquired by Andrew Barnes. Westernasset was subsequently wound up and shares in Bure Valley Railway (1991) Limited were held directly by Andrew Barnes, who operates the railway on a not for profit basis with the support of many volunteers.

Broadland District Council considered selling the line to the Bure Valley Railway in June 2017, but this was delayed by Brexit, resulting in a partnership approach being made by Norfolk County Council, which it was felt would improve the opportunities for funding and ensure the retention of the permissive footpath alongside the line. The council's managing director stated that it was important that "members should be sure about what they were seeking to achieve by the disposal of the railway". The council changed its mind before the transaction was completed and the route continues to be owned by Broadland District Council. In 2019 Norfolk County Council received £1.2 million Interreg funding to invest in refurbishments along the Bure Valley route. This was additional to the £10,000 annual maintenance budget the council employs on the line.

In March 2020 the Bure Valley Railway threatened to take the council to the Office of Rail and Road over a claimed contractual failure to adequately maintain fences and structures along the line for which the council has responsibility.

=== COVID-19 and financial troubles ===
In April 2020 the railway stated that they were in difficulties due to the impact of the COVID-19 pandemic on their operations.

In June 2020 the local media reported, that the BVR were in "dire straits" and at risk of closure due to the impact of the COVID-19 pandemic and the refusal of an insurance claim relating to loss of income, despite Broadland DC deferring their annual £30,000 rent payments until September 2020 and receiving a £25,000 Covid-19 support grant. Full relief from business rates was granted by national government for 2020/21 fiscal year. The BVR furloughed some of its staff.

The railway's case against insurer MS Amlin, who the railway claimed had refused to pay out cover for loss of income due to “any notifiable disease within a radius of 25 miles of the premises” drew national attention. The railway was able to re-open with volunteers on at weekends from 11 July and 5 days per week from 1 August were all staff came off the Coronavirus Job Retention Scheme. As of January 2021, the insurance claim remained unpaid despite a High Court ruling that insurers had to make payments owed under business interruption policies.

In January 2021 the railway, once again, declared that they were in financial crisis, having lost £765,000 in a year despite having been able to operate for much of their main season. The issues were compounded by the discovery of major faults on two of the railway's steam locomotive boilers, the failures of which might mean that the railway would not have the required locomotives to be able to reopen if said boilers were not repaired/replaced.

The railway opened again in Summer 2021, after the boilers of two locomotives were replaced.

=== Alternative fuel trials ===
In June and December 2021, the railway performed trials contributing to the development of a sustainable coal replacement for steam locomotives on heritage railways, in collaboration with the Advanced Steam Traction Trust (ASTT), the Heritage Railway Association, and Coal Products Limited.

The first trial compared 3 bio-coals to traditional welsh coal, and the second pitted the best performing of these bio-coals against the welsh coal again, but under harsher conditions. The first trial found that a variant of Ecoal50 could deliver equal engine performance with a 28% increase in coal consumption, and this coal was chosen for use in the second trial.

In May 2022, the railway won the Heritage Railway Association's Award for Environmental Innovation for their work.

== Locomotives ==
A list of the railway's operational locomotives is below:

No.	Name	Year built	Livery	Locomotive type	Wheel arr.	Image
1	Wroxham Broad (previously Tracy-Jo)	1964 (converted to a 2-6-4T in 1992)	Light Blue	Steam	2-6-4T	
3	2nd Air Division USAAF	1988	Golden Ochre	Diesel	B-B	
4	(Not named) (Unofficially Rusty)	1954 (rebuilt and regauged 2004)	Orange	Diesel	4wDH	
5	(Not named) (Unofficially Toby)	1960	Green with red detail	Diesel	4wDM	
6	Blickling Hall	1994	Great Eastern Railway Blue	Steam	2-6-2	
7	Spitfire	1994	Lined Brunswick Green	Steam	2-6-2	
8	John of Gaunt (previously Thunder)	1997 (converted to coal-firing in 2008)	Lined Black	Steam	2-6-2T	
9	Mark Timothy	1999 (rebuilt and converted to coal-firing in 2003)	Madderlake Red	Steam	2-6-4T	
(10)		2024	Green	Battery Electric		

== Passenger coaches ==
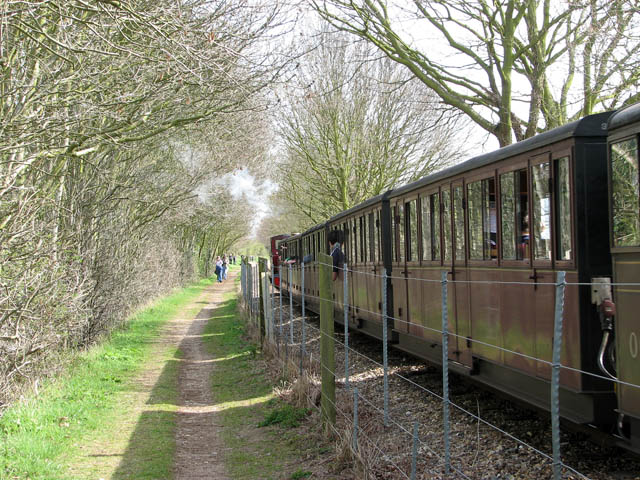
A typical train of Bure Valley Railway stock is heading east towards Buxton.

Passenger rolling stock consists of 29 vehicles, which are usually marshalled so as to form three complete carriage sets, thus allowing for the operation of up to three distinct passenger trains. The 29 vehicles may be further subdivided as below:

- 19 standard passenger saloon bogie coaches
- 6 standard passenger saloon bogie coaches with wheelchair-accessible compartments
- 1 brake composite bogie coach with guard's compartment, baggage compartment, and passenger compartments
- 1 brake composite bogie coach with guard's compartment, baggage compartment, and diesel generator for winter train heating
- 2 brake short-wheelbase coaches (4-wheel) with guard's compartment and baggage compartment

All except one of the carriages are equipped with electric heating, for winter services. All carriages are equipped with internal lighting. All carriages are connected to a passenger communication system, allowing passengers to stop the train in an emergency.

In addition to the standard coaching stock, two non-standard passenger saloon bogie coaches, formerly used on the Fairbourne Railway, were acquired for use on special event days, purporting to be Thomas the Tank Engine's coaches, Annie and Clarabel. These vehicles were subsequently sold to the Evesham Vale Light Railway and left Aylsham in Spring 2016. They are now painted in standard EVLR colours.

== Accidents ==
On Monday 30 May 2011, a train on the line suffered a derailment at Brampton, during which wheels from one of the coaches were reported to have come up through the floor of the vehicle. The Rail Accident Investigation Branch were called in to conduct a preliminary examination into the incident, and found it to have been caused by the failure due to metal fatigue of an axle journal that had been welded several years previously (when the railway was under different management). It found that the BVR did not have an adequate safety management system. Following this accident all wheels of this design were identified by the railway and scrapped, being replaced by new wheelsets, and a new computerised passenger carriage maintenance database was introduced, providing detailed tracking of the service regime of whole carriages, and of individual bogies and axles.

== The Friends of the Bure Valley Railway ==
The Friends of the Bure Valley Railway (FoBVR) is the volunteer supporting group for the Bure Valley Railway. It owns locomotive number 4 and supports the railway financially and with regular working parties of volunteers. There is a hut at Aylsham which sells donated bric-a-brac, second hand books and magazines during the season to raise money to support the railway. A secondhand book, record and DVD shop is open at Wroxham station.

== See also ==
- Bressingham Steam and Gardens
- North Norfolk Railway
- Mid-Norfolk Railway
- Wells and Walsingham Light Railway
- Whitwell & Reepham railway station
- Yaxham Light Railway
- Barton House Railway

== Bibliography ==
- Joby, Richard S. (1975). The East Norfolk Railway. Klofron.
- Joby, Richard S. (1991). Bure Valley Railway, The Broadland Line. Norwich: Jarrold Publishing. ISBN 0-7117-0395-7.
