= Railway stations in Cromer =

Railway stations in Norfolk, England

Coordinates: 52.9305°N 1.2926°E

The fishing port and holiday resort of Cromer, in the English county of Norfolk, has had a rail service since 1877. It was served by three railway stations for many years and is now served by two. Cromer Beach station, which opened in 1887, was renamed Cromer in 1969 following the closure of the other early stations.

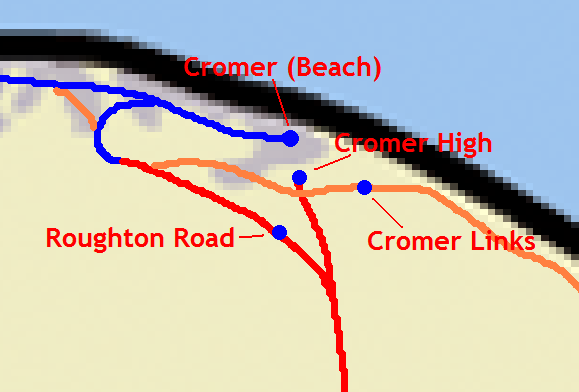
Layout of the four Cromer railway stations; the Great Eastern Railway lines are in red, the Midland and Great Northern Joint Railway line in blue, and the disused Norfolk and Suffolk Joint Railway line to Mundesley in orange.

Cromer High station, on the outskirts of the town, was opened in 1877 as the terminus of the Great Eastern Railway main line from London. It was followed in 1887 by Cromer Beach station, on the rural Midland and Great Northern Joint Railway (M&GNJR). Cromer Links Halt station, on the little-used and now closed Norfolk and Suffolk Joint Railway line to North Walsham Town via Overstrand and Mundesley, was opened in 1923.

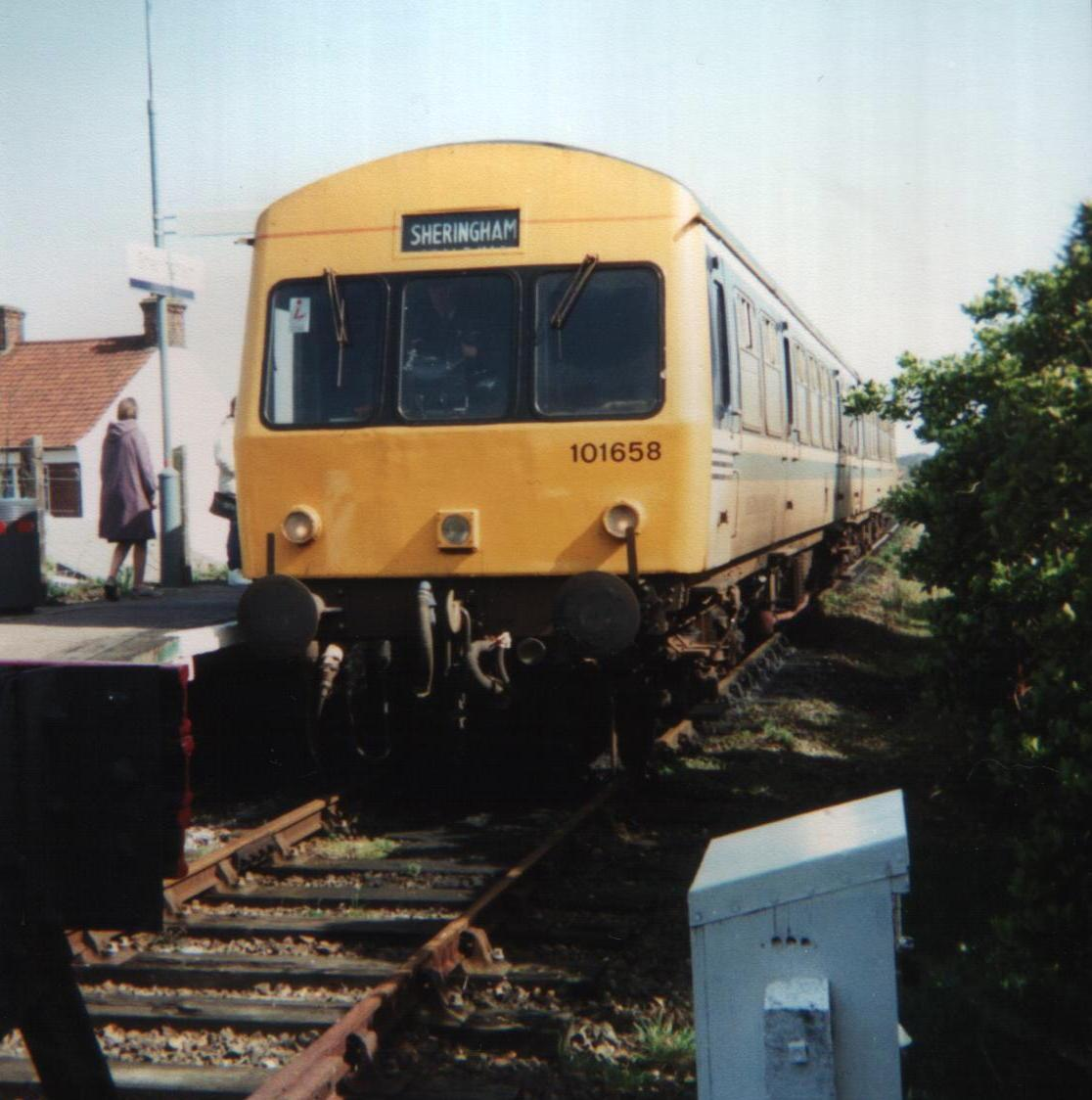
A British Rail Class 101 in Regional Railways livery.

Following a reduction in traffic caused by Cromer's decline in popularity as a holiday destination after World War II, and the closure of many Norfolk railway lines in the 1950s, a decision was made to concentrate all passenger traffic into a single station. Although Cromer High had far better facilities, it was situated inconveniently on the edge of the town. Therefore, all passenger services were diverted into Cromer Beach (now Cromer) and the other stations closed. Following growth of the town as a commuter town to Norwich, a new station called Roughton Road opened in 1985, near to the site of the former Cromer High.

== Cromer railway station ==
Because the Midland and Great Northern Joint Railway (M&GNJR) line approached Cromer from the west, following the coastal clifftops, it avoided the steep escarpment which had prevented the earlier line from Norwich running all the way into the town. Consequently, it became possible to build a far more conveniently located station, near to the town centre and the beach. The station opened as Cromer Beach on 16 June 1887 and was renamed Cromer on 20 October 1969, following the closure of Cromer High station in 1954. It is 26 miles 52 chains (42.9 km) down the line from Norwich.

== Roughton Road railway station ==
Roughton Road was opened on 20 May 1985, to serve the new housing developments in the area. It is on the southern edge of Cromer, near the junction for the disused Cromer Tunnel leading to the former Norfolk and Suffolk Joint Railway line, about 200 yards (183 m) from the site of the former Cromer High station.

== Former stations ==
=== Cromer High railway station ===
Cromer High railway station was the first station opened in Cromer, situated to the south on the outskirts of the town on a steep escarpment. Built initially by the short-lived East Norfolk Railway, the station (along with the line) was incorporated into the Great Eastern Railway, who had operated the services from the beginning. It served as the terminus of Great Eastern Railway services from London and Norwich. Initially named Cromer on opening, it was renamed Cromer High on 27 September 1948.

=== Cromer Links Halt railway station ===
Cromer Links Halt (located at TG232409) was a railway station on the outskirts of Cromer. It was on the now disused Norfolk and Suffolk Joint Railway line between Roughton Road Junction and Overstrand station. It opened on 9 July 1923, only to close thirty years later on 7 April 1953.
