= Sidestrand Halt railway station =

Disused railway station in Norfolk, England

Coordinates: 52.9067°N 1.3562°E

Sidestrand Halt
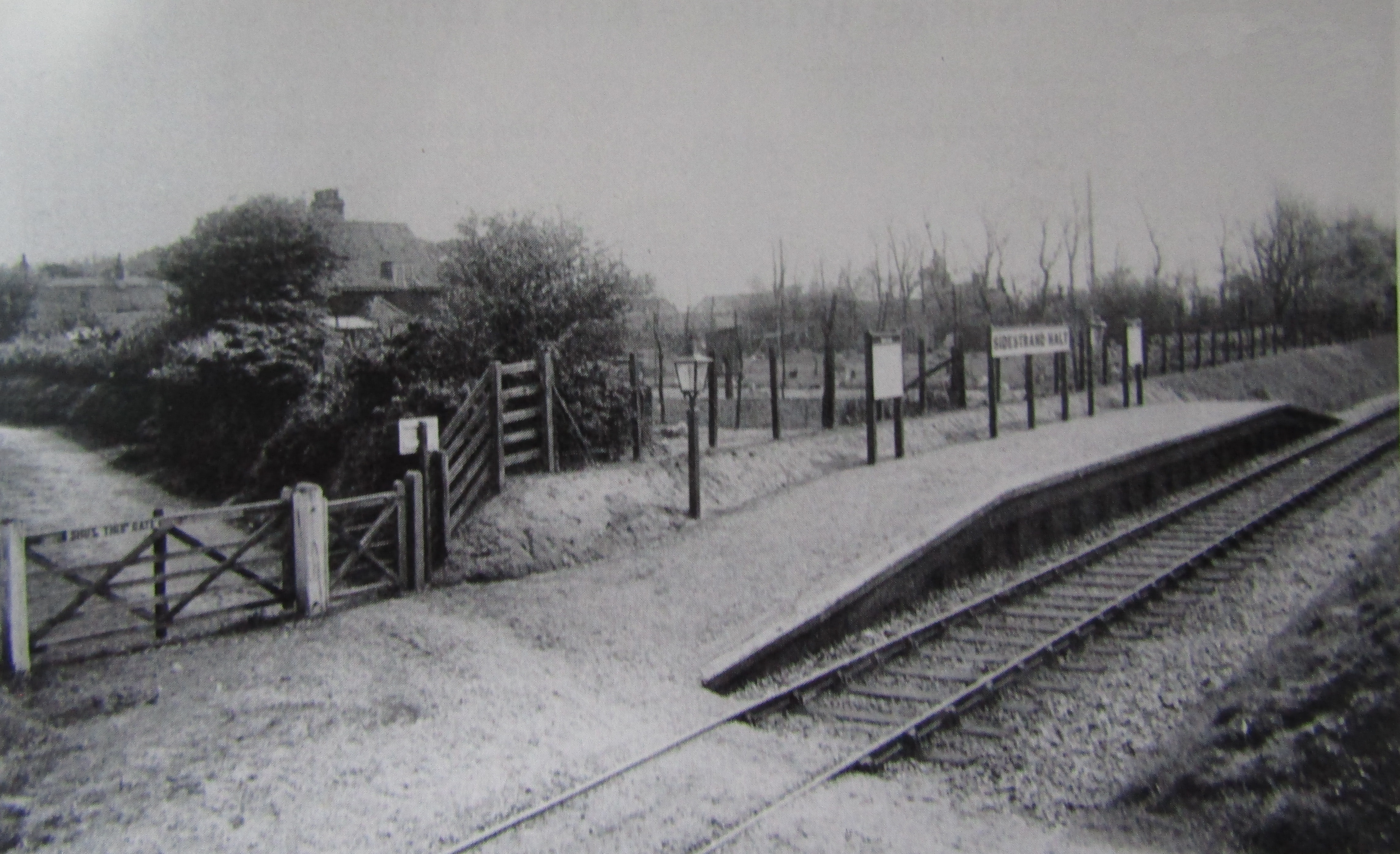
- Sidestrand Halt railway station

General information
- Location: Sidestrand, North Norfolk; England
- Grid reference: TG25673969
- Platforms: 1

Other information
- Status: Disused

History
- Post-grouping: Norfolk and Suffolk Joint Railway; Eastern Region of British Railways

Key dates
- 22 May 1936: Opened
- 7 April 1953: Closed
Location

Sidestrand Halt was a railway station on the Norfolk and Suffolk Joint Railway which briefly served the Norfolk coastal village of Sidestrand from 1936 to 1953.

== History ==
Much like its counterpart at Cromer Links Halt, Sidestrand consisted of a simple wooden platform capable of accommodating one coach. Hidden away at the end of a public footpath, the station did not have any ticket-issuing facilities, and these could only be purchased on the trains. The halt had been opened in an attempt to increase revenues on the line by further exploiting the tourist potential of "Poppyland", but in the event it only lasted seventeen years and closed along with the section of the line between Cromer and Mundesley in 1953.

Preceding station	Disused railways	Following station
Overstrand	Norfolk and Suffolk; Cromer Line	Trimingham
