= Norfolk Coast Express =

British passenger train

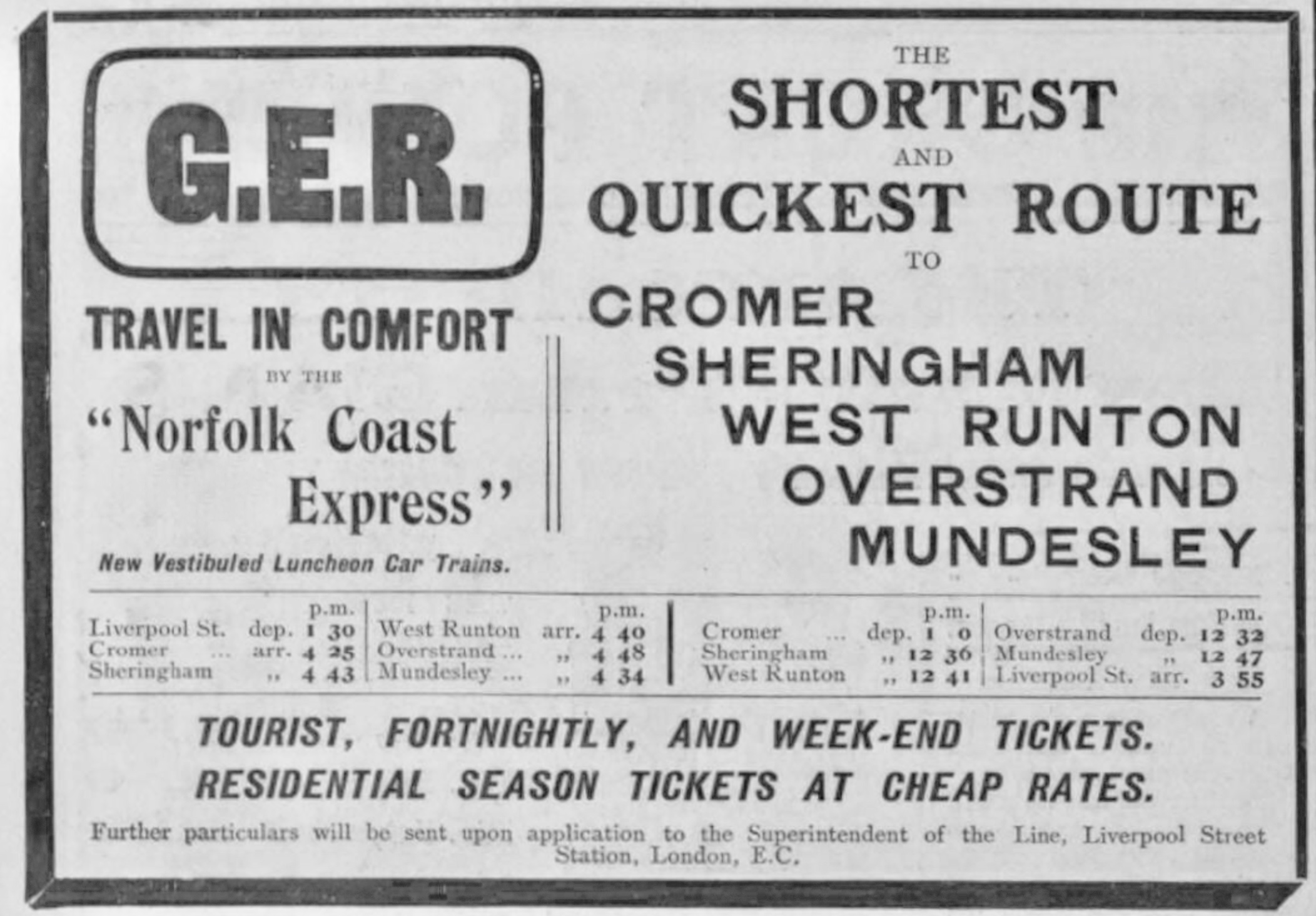
- Advert from the Illustrated London News 17 August 1907

Overview
- Service type: Passenger train
- First service: 1907
- Last service: 1914
- Former operator(s): GER

Route
- Termini: London Liverpool Street; Cromer, Sheringham, Mundesley
- Service frequency: Daily during July, August and September

The Norfolk Coast Express was a named passenger train operating in the United Kingdom.

== History ==
The train was introduced for the summer season in 1907 by the Great Eastern Railway. It was timed to leave London Liverpool Street at 1:30 pm, and arrive in Cromer at 4:25 pm, Sheringham at 4:43 pm, and Mundesley at 4:34 pm. The returning service departed Sheringham at 12:36 pm, Mundesley at 12:47 pm, Cromer at 1:00 pm, arriving in London Liverpool Street at 3:55 pm. It was scheduled to run non-stop between Liverpool St. and North Walsham in both directions, utilising the water troughs at Ipswich. It was the first, and until 1950, the only express to run non stop along the GEML.

For this new service the Great Eastern Railway provided new locomotives and rolling stock. The length of the train was 638 feet (194 m) with a trailing weight of 317 tons. It provided accommodation for 96 first class, and 320 third class passengers. The dining facilities provided luncheon for 108 passengers at one time. Luncheon was provided for half a Crown (equivalent to £16.7 in 2023).

The train was suspended in 1914 following the outbreak of the First World War and did not resume afterwards.
