= Gunton railway station =

Railway station in Norfolk, England

Coordinates: 52.866°N 1.349°E

Gunton
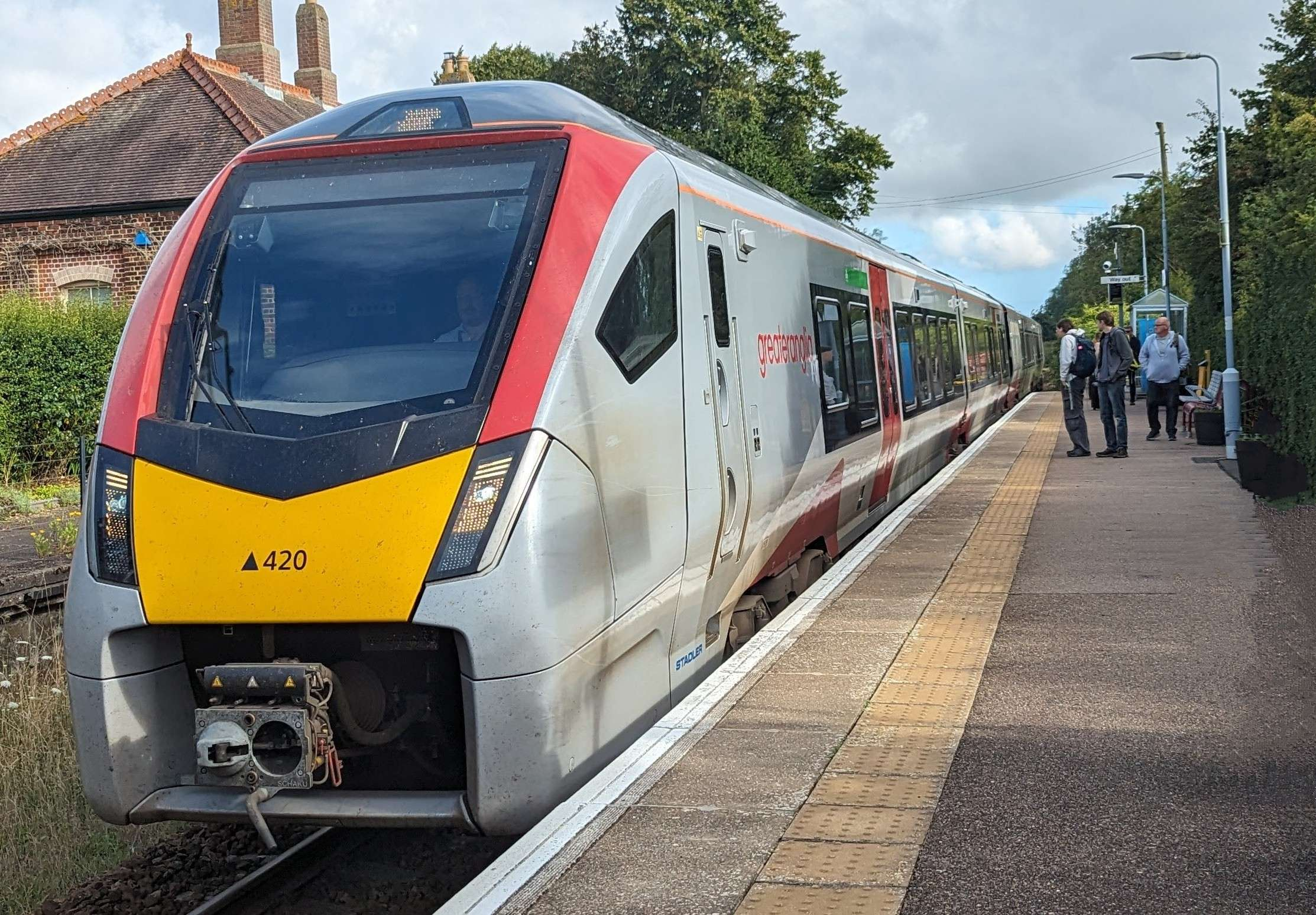

General information
- Location: Lower Street, Thorpe Market, Norfolk; England
- Grid reference: TG255351
- Manager: Greater Anglia
- Platforms: 1

Other information
- Station code: GNT
- Classification: DfT category F2

Key dates
- 29 July 1876: Opened
- 19 April 1965: Closed to freight

Passengers
- 2021/22: ▲22,228
- 2022/23: ▲28,446
- 2023/24: ▲30,084
- 2024/25: ▲36,122
- 2025/26: ▲37,524
Location
Notes
- Passenger statistics from the Office of Rail and Road

Gunton railway station is a stop on the Bittern Line in Norfolk, England. It serves the surrounding parishes, including Thorpe Market and Southrepps. It is 19 miles 63 chains (31.8 km) from Norwich, between North Walsham to the south and Roughton Road to the north. Train services are operated by Greater Anglia.

== History ==
There is no village named Gunton; the station is in the parish of Thorpe Market and closest to the hamlet of Lower Street in Southrepps parish.

It was built primarily for the convenience of Lord Suffield, who lived at nearby Gunton Hall. Suffield was a major investor in the original East Norfolk Railway, which built the line from Norwich to Cromer.

== Facilities ==
The station is unstaffed and consists of a single platform with a basic shelter. Originally the location of sidings and a passing loop, the northbound platform and station building are now privately owned.

There is a ticket machine, digital service displays and a small car park.

== Services ==
All services at Gunton are operated by Greater Anglia using Class 755 Electro-diesel multiple units.

The typical off-peak service is one train every two hours in each direction between Norwich and Sheringham via Cromer. During peak hours, the service is increased to one train per hour in each direction.

Preceding station	National Rail	Following station
North Walsham	Greater Anglia Bittern Line	Roughton Road
	Disused railways	
North Walsham Line and station open	Great Eastern Railway East Norfolk Railway	Cromer High Line and station closed
