= Trimingham railway station =

Disused railway station in Norfolk, England

Coordinates: 52.8969°N 1.3825°E

Trimingham
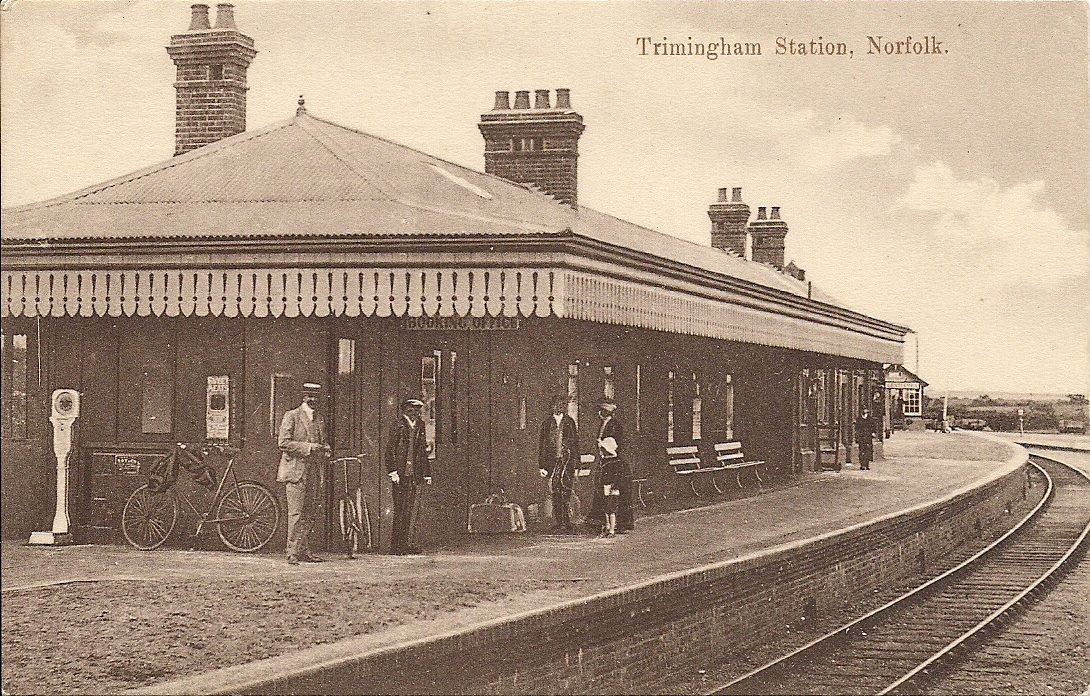

General information
- Location: Trimingham, North Norfolk, Norfolk; England
- Grid reference: TG275386
- Platforms: 2

Other information
- Status: Disused

History
- Original company: Norfolk and Suffolk Joint Railway
- Pre-grouping: Norfolk and Suffolk Joint Railway
- Post-grouping: Norfolk and Suffolk Joint Railway; Eastern Region of British Railways

Key dates
- 3 August 1906: Opened
- 7 April 1953: Closed
Location

Trimingham railway station was a station in Trimingham, Norfolk on the Norfolk and Suffolk Joint Railway line between Cromer Beach and North Walsham. It opened on 3 August 1906.

The station was host to a LNER camping coach in 1938 and 1939.

The station closed along this part of the line closed to passengers on 7 April 1953.

Preceding station	Disused railways	Following station
Sidestrand Halt	Norfolk and Suffolk; Cromer Line	Mundesley-on-Sea
