= Worstead railway station =

Railway station in Norfolk, England

Coordinates: 52.77733°N 1.40274°E

Worstead
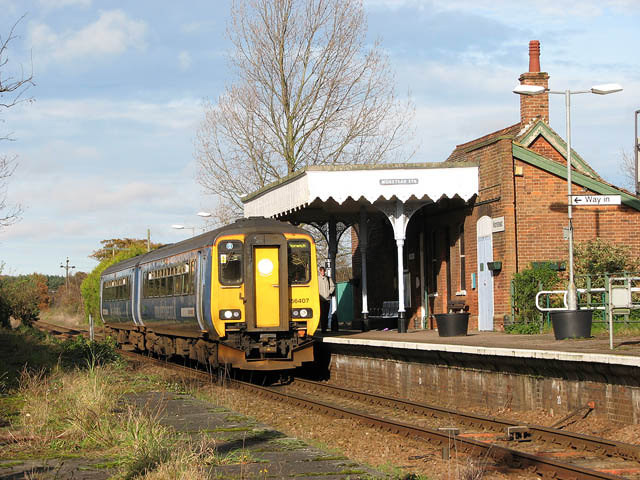
- A train calling at Worstead in 2008

General information
- Location: Worstead, North Norfolk; England
- Grid reference: TG296254
- Manager: Greater Anglia
- Platforms: 1

Other information
- Station code: WRT
- Classification: DfT category F2

Key dates
- 20 October 1874: Opened
- 13 July 1964: Closed to freight

Passengers
- 2021/22: ▲22,270
- 2022/23: ▲26,816
- 2023/24: ▲27,188
- 2024/25: ▲29,316
- 2025/26: ▲32,092
Location
Notes
- Passenger statistics from the Office of Rail and Road

Worstead railway station is on the Bittern Line in Norfolk, England, serving the villages of Worstead and Sloley. It is 13 miles 12 chains (21.2 km) down the line from Norwich and is situated between Hoveton & Wroxham to the south and North Walsham to the north. Train services are operated by Greater Anglia.

== Services ==
All services at Worstead are operated by Greater Anglia using Class 755 BMUs.

The typical off-peak service is one train every two hours in each direction between Norwich and Sheringham via Cromer. During the peak hours, the service is increased to one train per hour in each direction.

Preceding station	National Rail	Following station
Hoveton & Wroxham	Greater Anglia Bittern Line	North Walsham
