= Cromer Links Halt railway station =

Former railway station in England

Cromer Links Halt (located at TG232409) was a railway station on the outskirts of Cromer. It was on the now disused Norfolk and Suffolk Joint Railway line between Roughton Road Junction and Overstrand station. It opened on 9 July 1923, only to close thirty years later on 7 April 1953.

== History ==
Opened as part of an attempt to encourage holiday traffic on the line, the halt primarily served golfers at the nearby Royal Cromer Golf Club. The station facilities were very basic, consisting of no more than a single wooden platform, which cost £170 to build, two wooden benches and running in board together with the obligatory oil lamps. No shelter was provided for passengers and the platform was constructed of sleepers and supported by wooden trestles.

The halt was approached from the road by a path leading up the embankment on which the railway ran. To the west, a bridge carried the line over Northrepps Road from where it proceeded on another embankment before reaching Cromer Tunnel which was built by the Norfolk and Suffolk Joint Railway to take the line under the Great Eastern's Cromer High to Norwich route. Although only 61 yards long, the tunnel is notable as being one of only two standard gauge tunnels anywhere in Norfolk, the other being Barsham Tunnel on the Wells-on-Sea branch. However, as Barsham Tunnel was opened out before 1912, Cromer Tunnel is actually the only tunnel.

The line was served in general by around half a dozen trains each way between North Walsham, Mundesley and Cromer Beach. However, with no direct service to Norwich - the nearest city - the halt was little-used, and closed in 1953 as part of a package of early rationalisation measures undertaken by British Railways after nationalisation, which also involved the closure of the line from Roughton Road Junction to Mundesley. The coastal line, although highly picturesque, carried little traffic and its closure made sound economic sense to British Railways.

== Present day ==
Due to its wooden construction, virtually no trace of Cromer Links Halt has survived other than the gate to the approach path up the embankment, the rotting remains of which were said to be entangled in the undergrowth at the site of the station.

Preceding station	Disused railways	Following station
Cromer Beach	Norfolk and Suffolk; Cromer Branch	Overstrand

== See also ==
- Railway stations in Cromer
