= Thorpe Market =

Village in Norfolk, England

Coordinates: 52.8751°N 1.3285°E

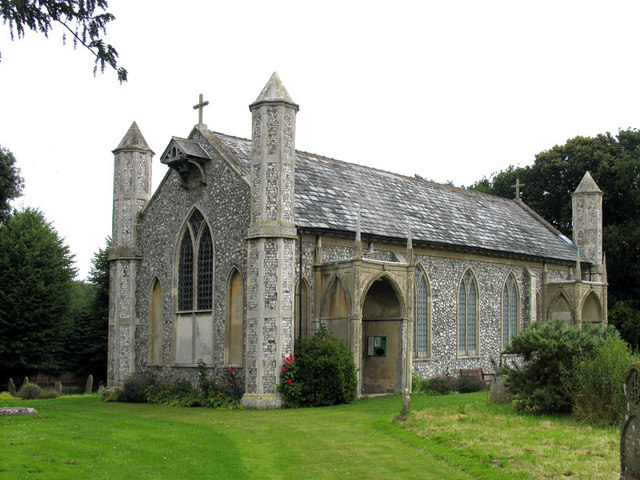
- St Margaret, Thorpe Market

- Location within Norfolk
- Area: 5.89 km^{2} (2.27 sq mi)
- Population: 289 (parish, 2011 census)
  - Density: 49/km^{2} (130/sq mi)
- OS grid reference: TG240361
  - London: 135 miles
- Civil parish: Thorpe Market
- District: North Norfolk
- Shire county: Norfolk
- Region: East
- Country: England
- Sovereign state: United Kingdom
- Post town: NORWICH
- Postcode district: NR11
- Police: Norfolk
- Fire: Norfolk
- Ambulance: East of England
- UK Parliament: North Norfolk

Thorpe Market is a village in the English county of Norfolk. The village is located 4.4 miles south of Cromer and 20.5 miles north of Norwich. The village's name means 'Outlying farm/settlement with a market'.

== The parish church ==
The parish church of Thorpe Market is called St Margaret's. The present church was built in 1796 on the site of an older mediaeval church. This later church was one of the first Gothic Revival buildings to be erected in the county of Norfolk and was built on the instructions of the first Lord Suffield.

The church has an unusual colour scheme inside, having pink walls and a blue plaster ceiling. Most of the furnishings are from the late 19th century. There are two screens. The church is part of the Ten Parishes which are overseen by the Trunch team ministry.

== Transport ==
The nearest railway station is at Gunton on the Bittern Line, which runs between Sheringham, Cromer and Norwich. Greater Anglia operates generally two-hourly services in both directions.

The village straddles the A149 road, which links King's Lynn with Great Yarmouth.

The nearest airport is Norwich International Airport.
