= Sloley =

Village in North Norfolk, England

Coordinates: 52.770°N 1.396°E

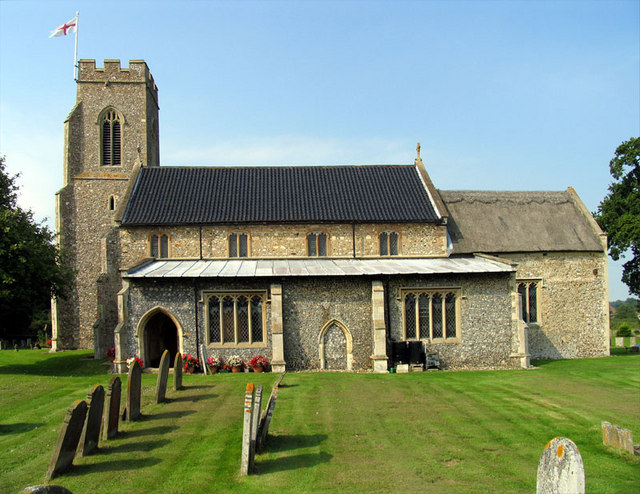
- Saint Bartholomew parish church, Sloley

- Location within Norfolk
- Area: 3.04 km^{2} (1.17 sq mi)
- Population: 257 (parish, 2011 census)
  - Density: 85/km^{2} (220/sq mi)
- OS grid reference: TG292247
  - London: 128 miles (206 km)
- Civil parish: Sloley
- District: North Norfolk
- Shire county: Norfolk
- Region: East
- Country: England
- Sovereign state: United Kingdom
- Post town: NORWICH
- Postcode district: NR12
- Dialling code: 01692
- Police: Norfolk
- Fire: Norfolk
- Ambulance: East of England

Sloley is a village and a civil parish in the English county of Norfolk. The village is 11.9 miles (19.2 km) north-north-east of Norwich, 13.6 miles (21.9 km) south-south-east of Cromer and 128 miles (206 km) northeast of London. The village lies 4.7 miles (7.6 km) south of the town of North Walsham. Worstead railway station, on the Bittern Line between Sheringham and Norwich, is about 1 km (0.62 mi) from the centre of the village. The nearest airport is Norwich International Airport. The parish had a population of 257 at the 2011 Census.

The civil parish of Sloley has an area of 3.04 km^{2} (1.17 sq mi) and includes the small village of Frankfort. For the purposes of local government, it falls within the district of North Norfolk.

== Description ==
The parish of Sloley lies in the northeast of the county of Norfolk. It is bounded on the southeast with the parish of Tunstead, whilst to the west lies the parish of Scottow. The northern boundary is with the parishes of Westwick and Worstead. The northeast corner is crossed north to south by the Bittern railway line which runs between Sheringham and Norwich. Dissecting the parish east to west is New Barn lane, which follows the route of an old Roman road that was an extension to the Fen Causeway and is thought to be a major east–west route which continued to Smallburgh, and possibly continued to Caister or an important port since eroded by the sea. The name Sloley comes from the 7th-century Old English for "sla" meaning "sloe", plus "leah", a wood or clearing; hence, "leah where sloes grew".

== The Domesday Book ==
Sloley has an entry in the Domesday Book of 1086 where it, its population, land ownership and productive resources were extensively detailed. In the survey Sloley is recorded by the name of Slaleia. The abbot of Holme, Ralph de Beaufour and Reynald Fitzlvo are recorded as the main tenants. The survey also lists is a church.

== Notable buildings and structures ==
=== The parish church of Saint Bartholomew ===
The parish church of Saint Bartholomew is located to the south-east of the village. The church tower is offset to the north of the main body of the church, the result of rebuilding and extensions built on to this church in the 14th and 15th centuries. The north aisle has been constructed on what was the site of the original Norman church in the 15th century. The arcades and clerestory were built in the 15th century, along with a south aisle and new south porch and the top of the tower added. Also during this time the chancel arch was moved south and it to is now off-centre. The south aisle is larger than the north in order to accommodate an altar tomb to Oliver le Gros who was Lord of the Manor who lived at Sloley Old Hall, and who died in 1448. Other internal features are some 15th-century carved bench ends, 17th- and 18th-century floor tombs, 19th-century box pews and a two-decker pulpit and 18th- and 19th-century monuments, some in Gothic Revival style. The font is a fine example and is octagonal carved stone showing the seven sacraments and the Baptism of Christ with four small lions on the corners of the foot.

=== Sloley Old Hall ===
Sloley Old Hall belonged to the Le Gros family, who were at one time Lords of the manor of Sloley with family records which run back to the reign of King Steven. At one time the Le Gros family were major holders of land within the county of Norfolk and Sloley Old Hall was numbered among their manorial establishments. The existing house, which was known as Frankfort Manor, was built by Oliver Le Gros in the 16th century. Harman, who married the last of the Le Gros family, sold to Robert Walpole. The house then passed into the ownership of the Neville family, whose descendants still own the surrounding estate. The house as part of the Sloley Estate. The hall was once lived in by Sylvia Townsend Warner, a well-known author, who lived there with her lover Valentine Ackland also a poet. Alarmed by the growing threat of fascism, both women were active in the Communist Party of Great Britain, and visited Spain during the Civil War. They lived together from 1930 until Ackland's death in 1969.
