= Broadsman =

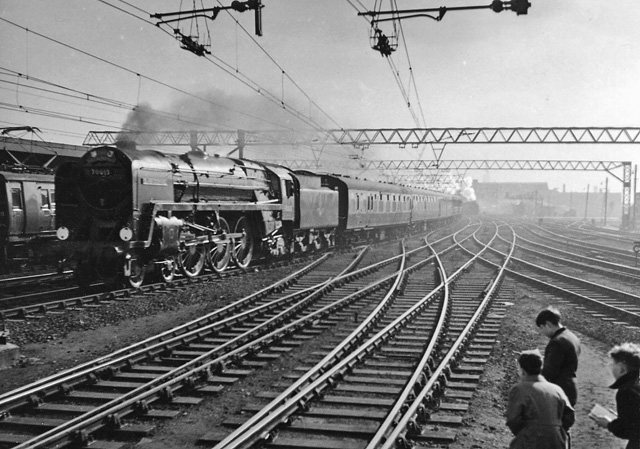
- The Down 'Broadsman' passes Stratford Station on 10 April 1958

Overview
- Service type: Passenger train
- First service: 1950
- Last service: 1962
- Former operator: BR

Route
- Termini: London Liverpool Street; Sheringham and Cromer
- Service frequency: Daily

The Broadsman was a named passenger train operating in the United Kingdom.

== History ==
The Broadsman was introduced by the British Rail in 1950. It provided a service between London Liverpool Street and Cromer, with through coaches for Sheringham. Initially the service was relatively leisurely, departing Cromer at 6.28 a.m., travelling via Norwich with an arrival in London at 10.16 a.m. The return was from London Liverpool Street at 3.40 p.m., arriving in Cromer at 7.15 p.m.

In 1951, the service was improved by the introduction of Britannia class locomotives, and 26 minutes was cut from the schedule. In 1952, the service was further improved with speed increases on the section between Norwich and London, running Ipswich to Norwich, 46.25 miles (74.43 km), in 45 minutes.

On 4 December 1957 a car crashed into the level crossing gate at Salhouse railway station. The owner managed to remove the vehicle from the line, but the Broadsman hit the level crossing gate at 45 to 50 mph and uprooted a five-ton concrete post. The train was undamaged.

The Great Eastern Main Line was upgraded in the 1960s with continuous welded rail, and diesel hauled services, and the named trains on this route lost their titles in 1962.
