= Sidestrand =

Village in Norfolk, England

Coordinates: 52.907°N 1.358°E

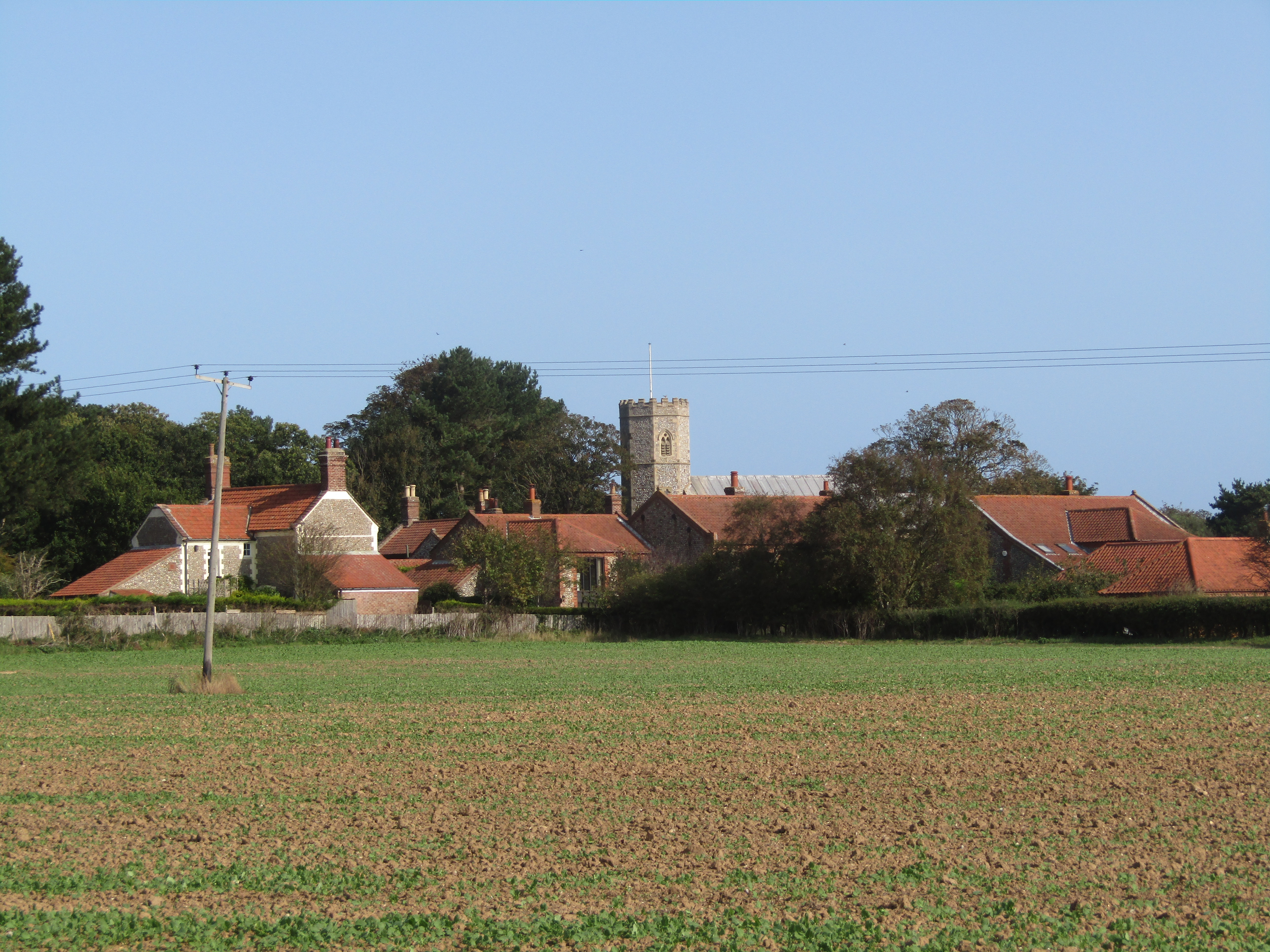
- The village of Sidestrand September 2020

- Location within Norfolk
- Area: 1.73 km^{2} (0.67 sq mi)
- Population: 370 (parish, 2001 census)
  - Density: 214/km^{2} (550/sq mi)
- OS grid reference: TG262392
  - London: 138 miles (222 km)
- Civil parish: Trimingham
- District: North Norfolk
- Shire county: Norfolk
- Region: East
- Country: England
- Sovereign state: United Kingdom
- Post town: CROMER
- Postcode district: NR27
- Dialling code: 01263
- Police: Norfolk
- Fire: Norfolk
- Ambulance: East of England

Sidestrand is a village and a civil parish on the coast of the English county of Norfolk. The village is 23.7 mi (38.1 km) north of Norwich, 3.3 mi (5.3 km) south east of Cromer and 138 mi (222 km) north-east of London. The nearest railway station is at North Walsham for the Bittern Line which runs between Cromer and Norwich. The nearest airport is Norwich International Airport. From the Census 2011 the population was included in the civil parish of Trimingham.

== History ==
The name Sidestrand is thought to derive from the old English word "sid", meaning broad or spacious, and the Danish "strond", meaning shore. The area was immortalised as "Poppyland" in the writings of the Victorian journalist Clement Scott.

== Coastline ==
The section of cliffs at Sidestrand is one of the wildest parts of the Norfolk coast due to its rapid erosion. Its beaches and dramatic cliffs are less accessible than most others along this part of the coastline. The 50m high cliffs contain glacial sediments and structures and its beach is popular with petrologists and fossil hunters.

== Saint Michael's church ==
Sidestrand parish church, which is dedicated to Saint Michael, is one of 124 round tower churches in Norfolk. It was erected in 1881 to replace an earlier church, closer to the cliff, that was threatened by coastal erosion. The earlier church was demolished, apart from the tower, which was left as a landmark and finally fell into the sea in 1916. The tower and graveyard had become known as the "Garden of Sleep", after Clement Scott's poem.

Notable burials in Sidestrand churchyard include:

- Verily Anderson (1951–2010), author
- Samuel Hoare, 1st Viscount Templewood (1880–1959), politician
- Paul Paget (1901–1985), architect

== Other items of interest ==
Sidestrand Hall was owned by the Flaxman and Spurrell families before being sold in 1880 to Samuel Hoare (later MP for Norwich). Now known as Sidestrand Hall School, it caters for boys and girls aged 8 to 16 years with moderate learning difficulties.

The windmill in the village was blown over in a gale in 1921.

Sidestrand Halt was a railway station on the Norfolk and Suffolk Joint Railway which briefly served the Norfolk village from 1936 to 1953. The line ran between Cromer and Mundesley.

The Sidestrand biplane bomber was named after the village; being made at the Boulton & Paul aircraft factory in Norwich in the late 1920s.

== Gallery ==
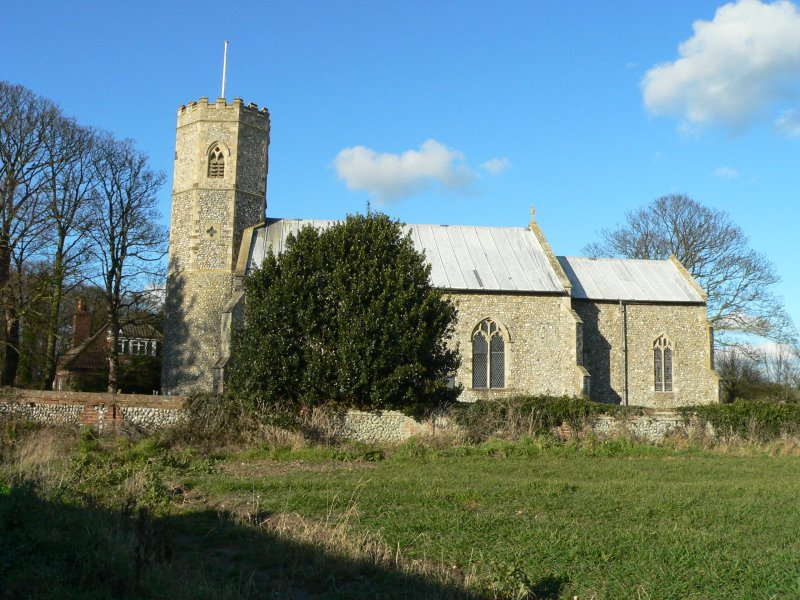
The Parish Church

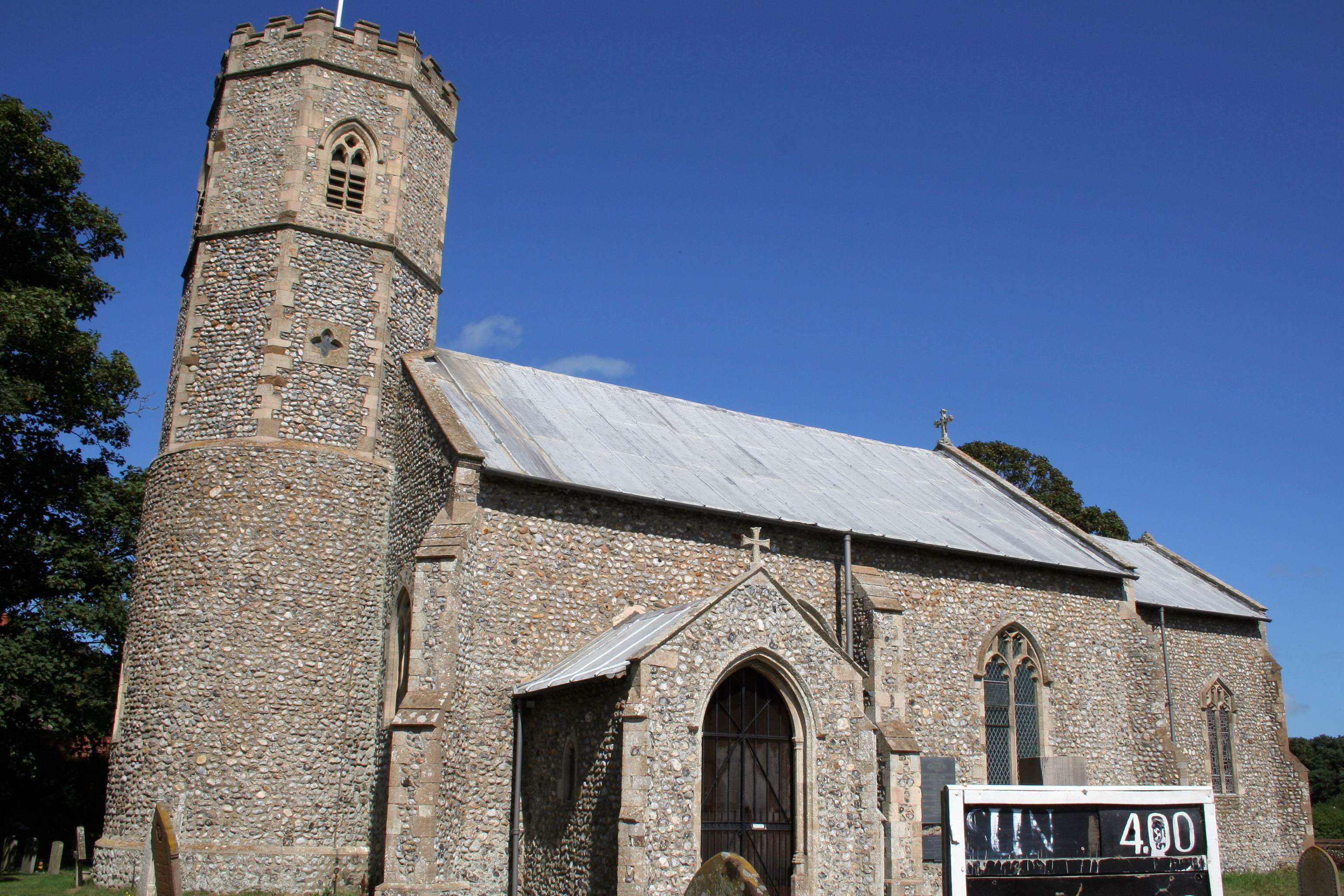
The Parish Church

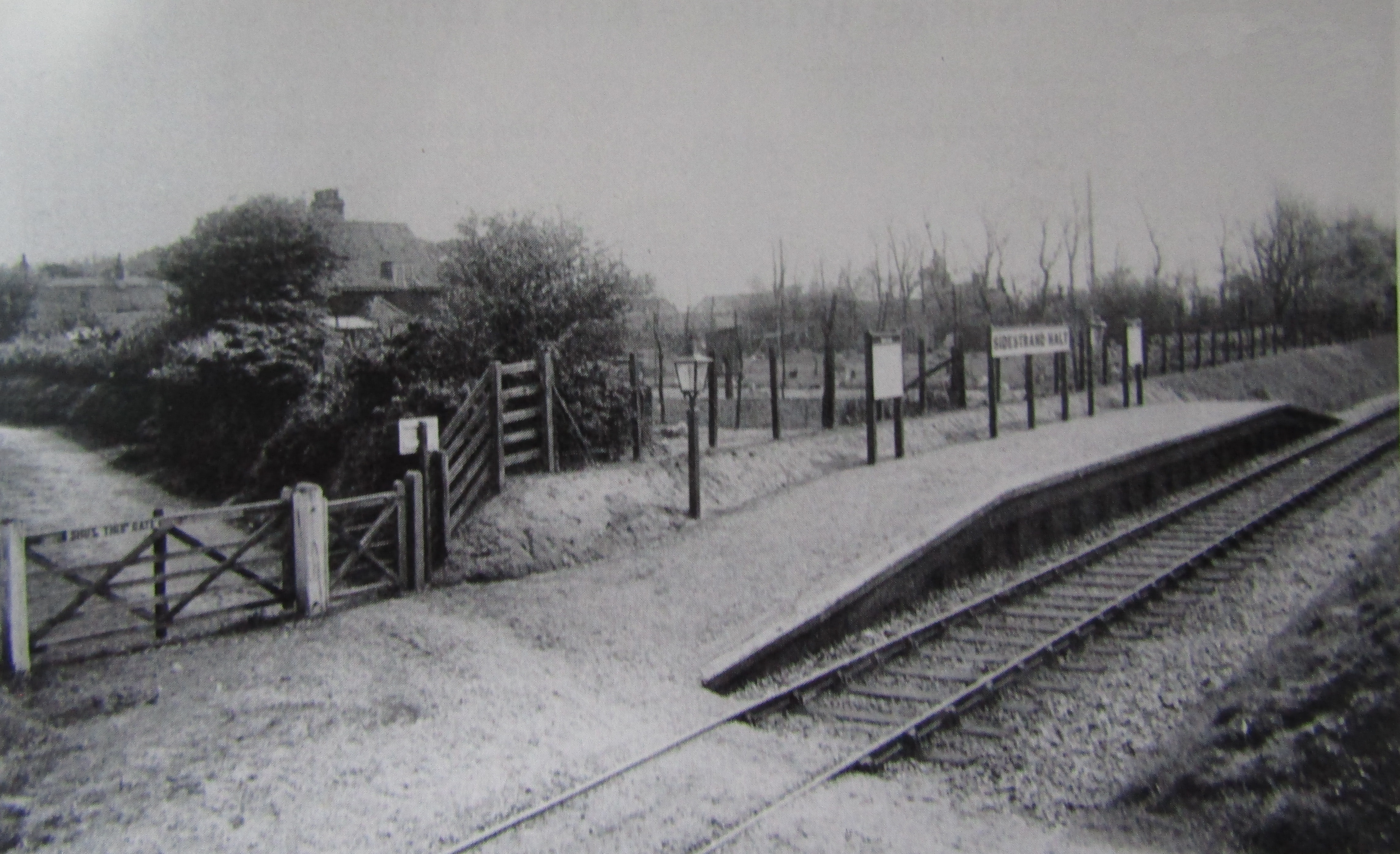
Sidestrand Halt railway station in 1906

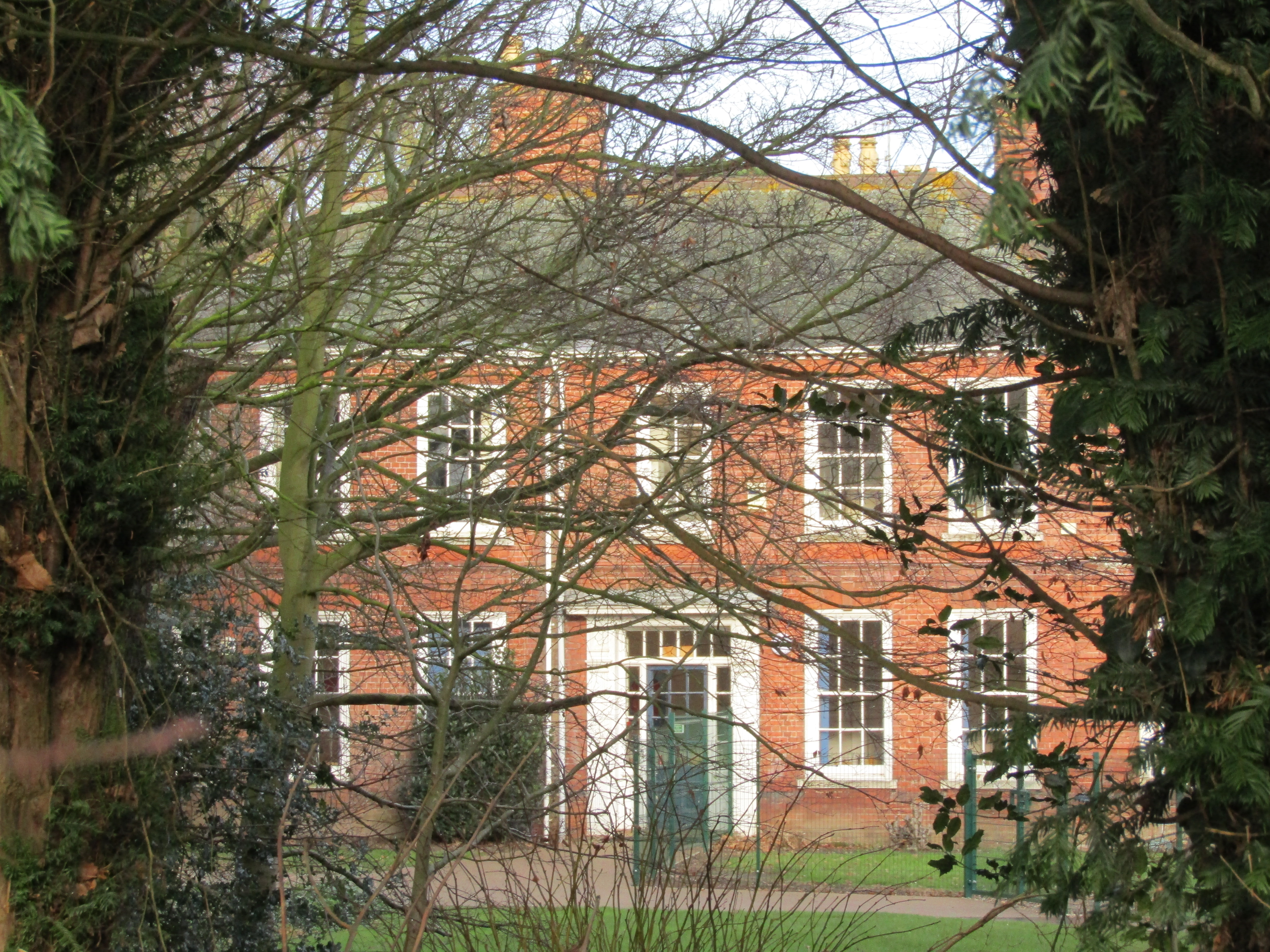
Sidestrand Hall School
