= West Runton railway station =

Railway station in Norfolk, England

West Runton
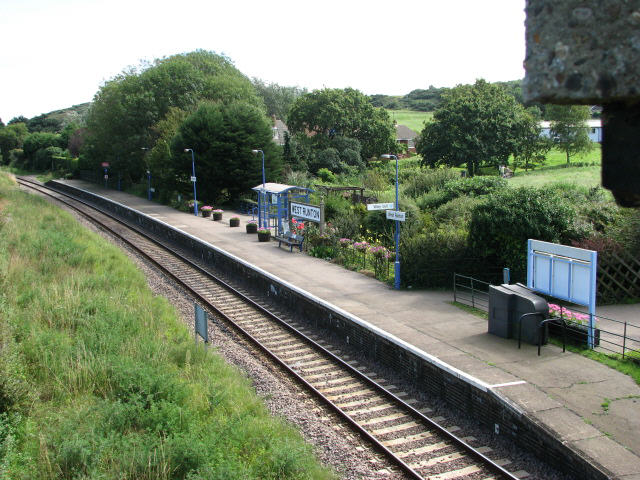

General information
- Location: West Runton, North Norfolk; England
- Coordinates: 52.9355°N 1.2457°E
- Grid reference: TG281297
- Manager: Greater Anglia
- Platforms: 1

Other information
- Station code: WRN
- Classification: DfT category F2

History
- Opened: September 1887

Passengers
- 2021/22: ▲31,834
- 2022/23: ▲32,918
- 2023/24: ▲34,194
- 2024/25: ▲34,872
- 2025/26: ▲37,720
Location
Notes
- Passenger statistics from the Office of Rail and Road

West Runton railway station is a stop on the Bittern Line in Norfolk, England, serving the village of West Runton. It is 28 miles 55 chains (46.2 km) down the line from Norwich and is situated between Cromer and Sheringham, the line's northern terminus. Train services are operated by Greater Anglia.

== History ==
The station opened in September 1887. It is one of two remaining Midland and Great Northern Joint Railway stations still in use on the National Rail network (Cromer being the other). Sheringham and Weybourne are the other two surviving M&GNJR stations; both are still served today on the heritage North Norfolk Railway.

Like other stations on the Bittern line, West Runton is cared for by volunteers known as station adopters.

== Services ==
All services at West Runton are operated by Greater Anglia using Class 755 BMUs.

The typical Monday-Saturday service is one train per hour in each direction between Sheringham and Norwich via Cromer. On Sundays, the service is reduced to one train every two hours in each direction.

Preceding station	National Rail	Following station
Sheringham	Greater Anglia Bittern Line	Cromer
	Historical railways	
Sheringham Line open, station preserved	Midland and Great Northern Joint Railway Cromer Branch	Cromer Beach Line and station open
