= Roughton Road railway station =

Railway station in Norfolk, England

Coordinates: 52.917950°N 1.299767°E

Roughton Road
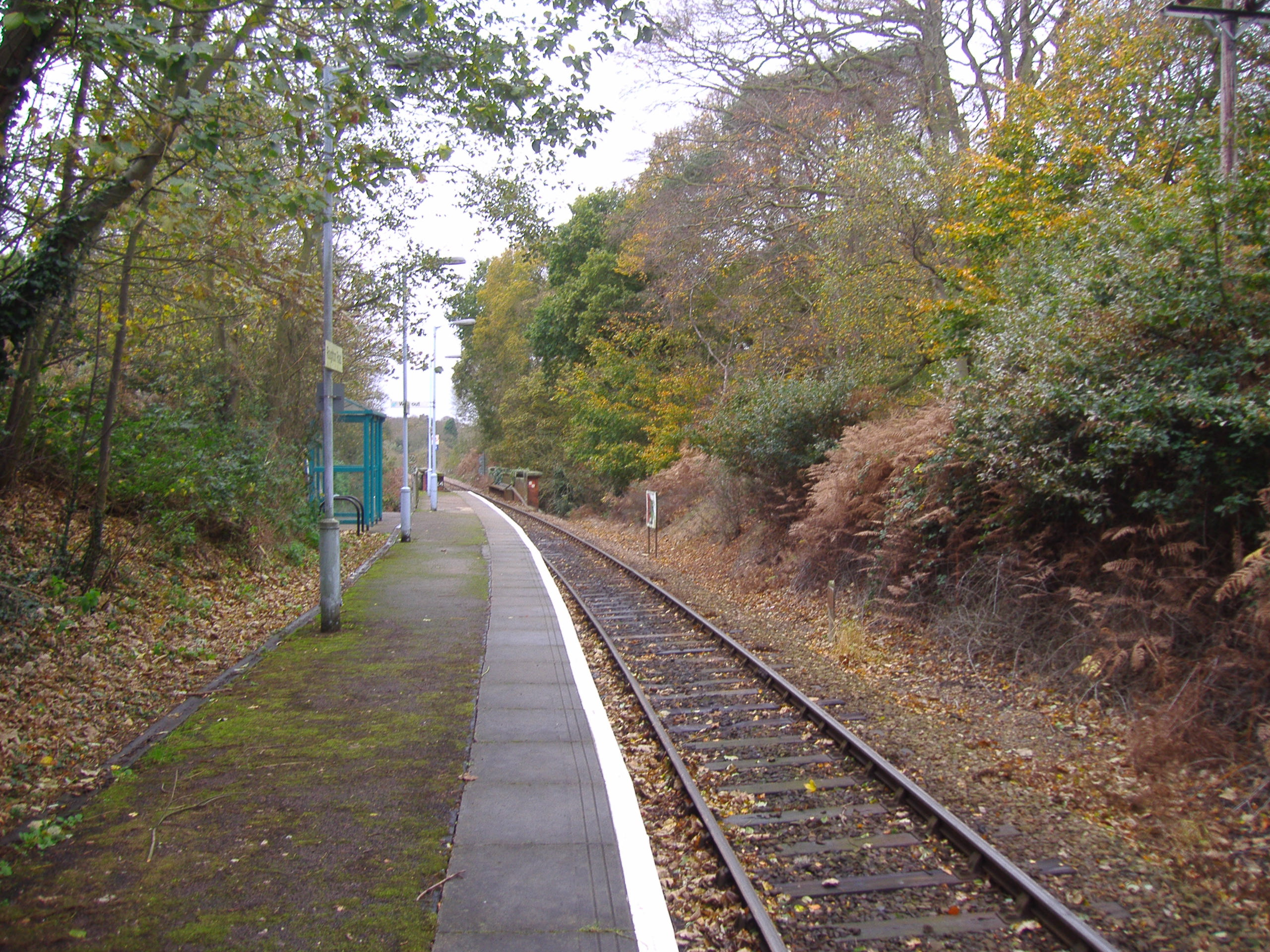

General information
- Location: Cromer, North Norfolk; England
- Grid reference: TG219407
- Manager: Greater Anglia
- Platforms: 1

Other information
- Station code: RNR
- Classification: DfT category F2

History
- Opened: 20 May 1985

Passengers
- 2021/22: ▲20,956
- 2022/23: ▲24,670
- 2023/24: ▼21,736
- 2024/25: ▼21,340
- 2025/26: ▲24,674
Location
Notes
- Passenger statistics from the Office of Rail and Road

Roughton Road railway station is a stop on the Bittern Line in Norfolk, England, on the outskirts of the town of Cromer. It takes its name from the street on which it is located and is several miles north of the village of Roughton. It is 24 miles 1 chain (38.6 km) down the line from Norwich and is situated between Gunton and Cromer stations.

== History ==
It is a modern halt station that was opened by British Rail in 1985. Today it is managed by Greater Anglia, which also operates all passenger trains that call. It is unstaffed and consists of a single platform.

The station is approximately 1/2 mile (0.80 km) from the site of a closed station called Cromer High, the former terminus of the Great Eastern Railway (GER). It is located on the site of the former junction between the GER and the Norfolk and Suffolk Joint Railway, at the entrance to the disused Cromer Tunnel.

== Services ==
All services at Roughton Road are operated by Greater Anglia using Class 755 BMUs.

The typical off-peak service is one train every two hours in each direction between Norwich and Sheringham via Cromer. During the peak hours, the service is increased to one train per hour in each direction.

Preceding station	National Rail	Following station
Gunton	Greater Anglia Bittern Line	Cromer
