= Bittern Line =

Branch line in Norfolk, England

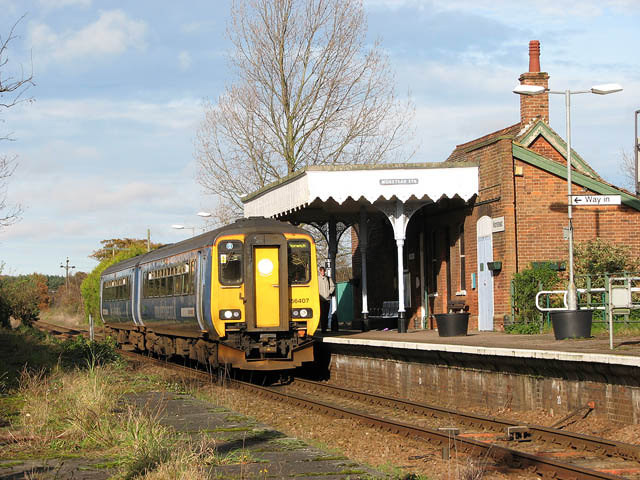
- A Class 156 train at Worstead in 2008

Overview
- Status: Operational
- Owner: Network Rail
- Locale: Norfolk, England
- Termini: Norwich; Sheringham
- Stations: 10

Service
- Type: Heavy rail
- System: National Rail
- Operator: Greater Anglia
- Rolling stock: Class 755

History
- Opened: 1874–77

Technical
- Line length: 30 miles 22 chains (48.7 km)
- Number of tracks: 1–2
- Character: Rural line
- Track gauge: 4 ft 8 1/2 in (1,435 mm) standard gauge
Route map
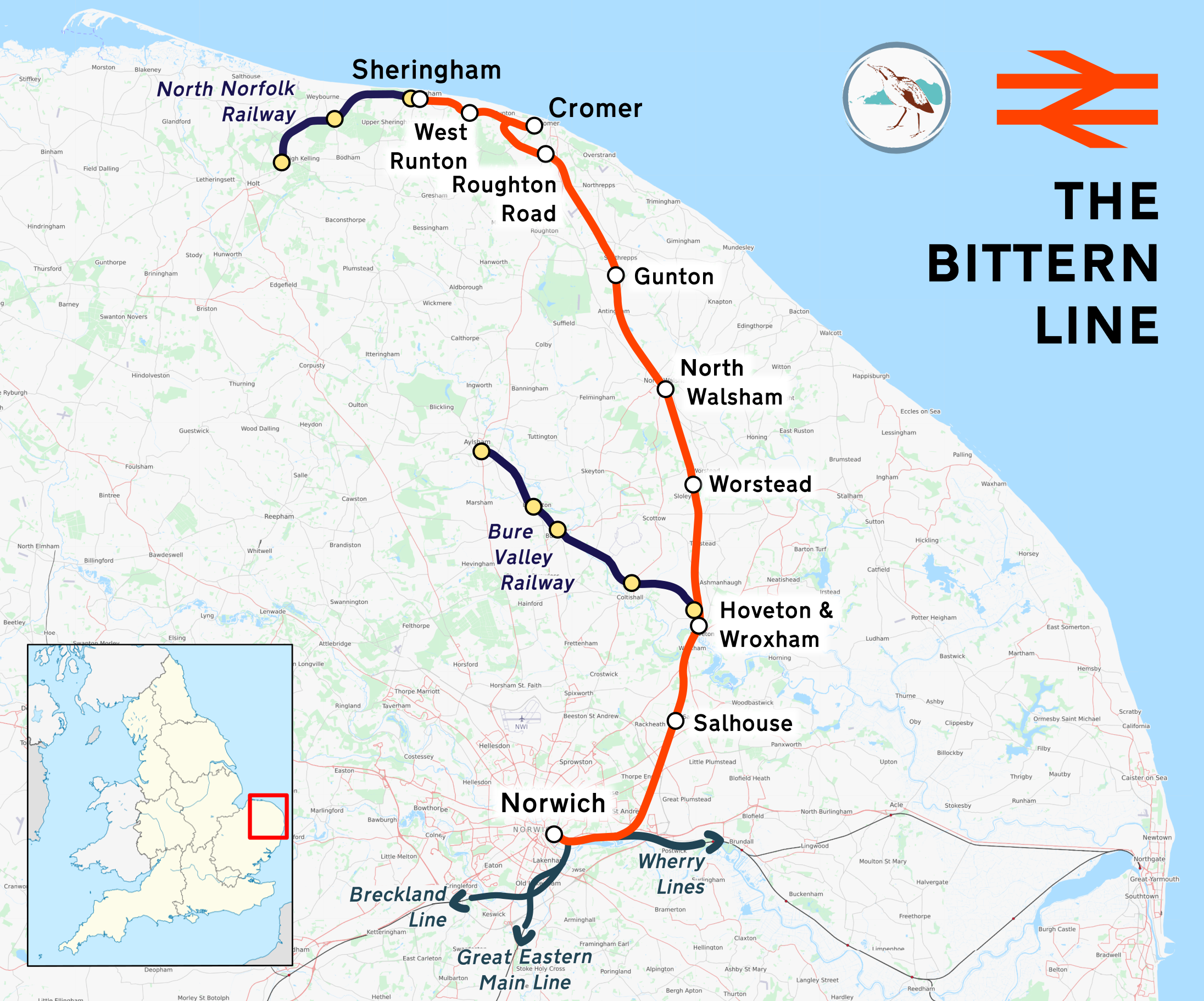
(Click to expand)

The Bittern Line is a railway branch line in Norfolk, England, that links Norwich to Sheringham. It passes through the Broads on its route to an Area of Outstanding Natural Beauty on the north Norfolk coast. It is named after the bittern, a rare bird found in the reedy wetlands of Norfolk.

The line is 30 miles 22 chains (48.7 km) in length and there are 10 stations. It is part of Network Rail Strategic Route 7, SRS 07.11, and is classified as a rural line.

Passenger services are operated by Greater Anglia, which also manages all of the stations.

== History ==
The line was granted permission in 1864 and the first stretch was opened between Norwich and North Walsham in 1874 by the East Norfolk Railway. It was extended to Cromer by 1877 before being extended to Sheringham in 1877, using a section of the Midland and Great Northern Joint Railway line. From the early twentieth century until the end of steam services, in 1962, the Great Eastern Railway operated coastal holiday services from London Liverpool Street under names such as the Norfolk Coast Express and The Broadsman.

Following the closure of the majority of the Midland and Great Northern network, the line operated as a single branch between Norwich and Melton Constable before the section between Sheringham and Melton Constable was closed in 1964. The remainder of the line was listed for closure in 1967 but survived the proposal after being declined by the Secretary of State for Transport.

The Bittern Line Partnership was set up by Norfolk County Council in 1997. and was designated a community rail line by the Department for Transport in September 2007.

The section of the line between Sheringham and Holt which was closed in the 1960s remains in use as a heritage railway line operated as the North Norfolk Railway (NNR - also known as the Poppy Line). After a period of 36 years, the link between the Bittern line and the North Norfolk Railway was reinstated in 2010 with the opening of a new level crossing at Sheringham.

Sheringham railway station was upgraded in 2019 to accommodate the new Class 755s.

== Stations ==
The following table summarises the line's 10 stations, their distance measured from Norwich, and their estimated number of passenger entries/exits in 2018/19 and 2022/23:

Station	Location	Local authority	Mileage	Passenger numbers	
Station	Location	Local authority	Mileage	2018/19	2022/23
Norwich	Norwich	City of Norwich	0	4,250,834	3,964,948
Salhouse	Salhouse	Broadland	6	11,778	14,006
Hoveton & Wroxham	Hoveton/Wroxham	North Norfolk	8 3/4	136,414	124,804
Worstead	Worstead	North Norfolk	13 1/4	25,650	26,816
North Walsham	North Walsham	North Norfolk	16	265,400	243,208
Gunton	Thorpe Market	North Norfolk	19 3/4	19,188	28,446
Roughton Road	Roughton	North Norfolk	24	21,766	24,670
Cromer	Cromer	North Norfolk	26 3/4	219,244	244,294
West Runton	West Runton	North Norfolk	28 3/4	27,212	32,918
Sheringham	Sheringham	North Norfolk	30 1/4	225,894	232,222

== Services ==
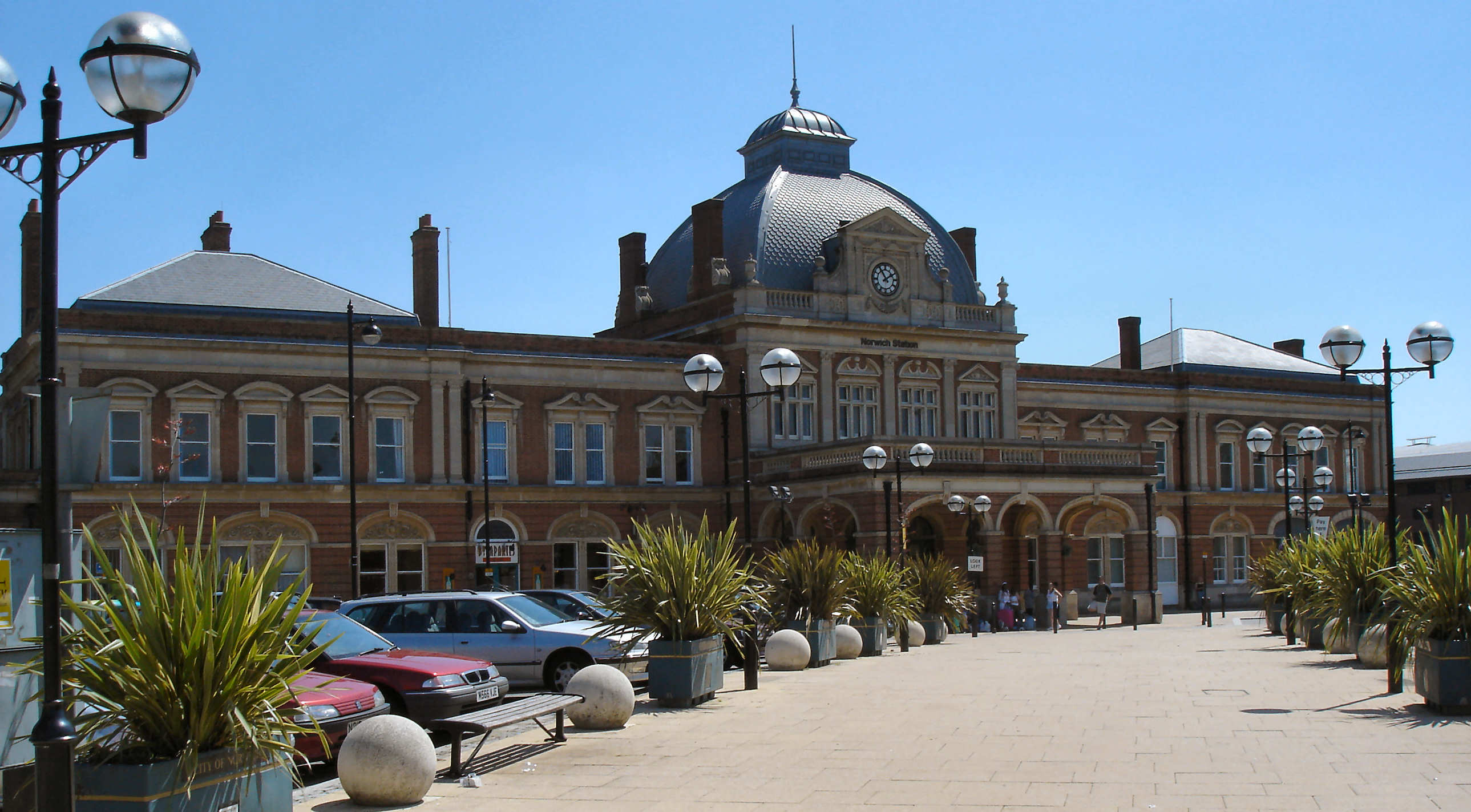
Norwich station in 2005

Passenger services are operated by Greater Anglia. The typical service is one train per hour in each direction between Norwich and Sheringham. Calling patterns are varied, with some trains stopping at all stations while others omit some of the lesser-used stations along the line, such as Salhouse, Gunton and Roughton Road.

In 2019, new Class 755 bi-mode trains began to replace the previous mixture of Class 153, Class 156 and Class 170 diesel multiple units.

The line is also used by freight trains which are operated by GB Railfreight. Some trains carry gas condensate from a terminal at North Walsham to Harwich International Port.

== Infrastructure ==
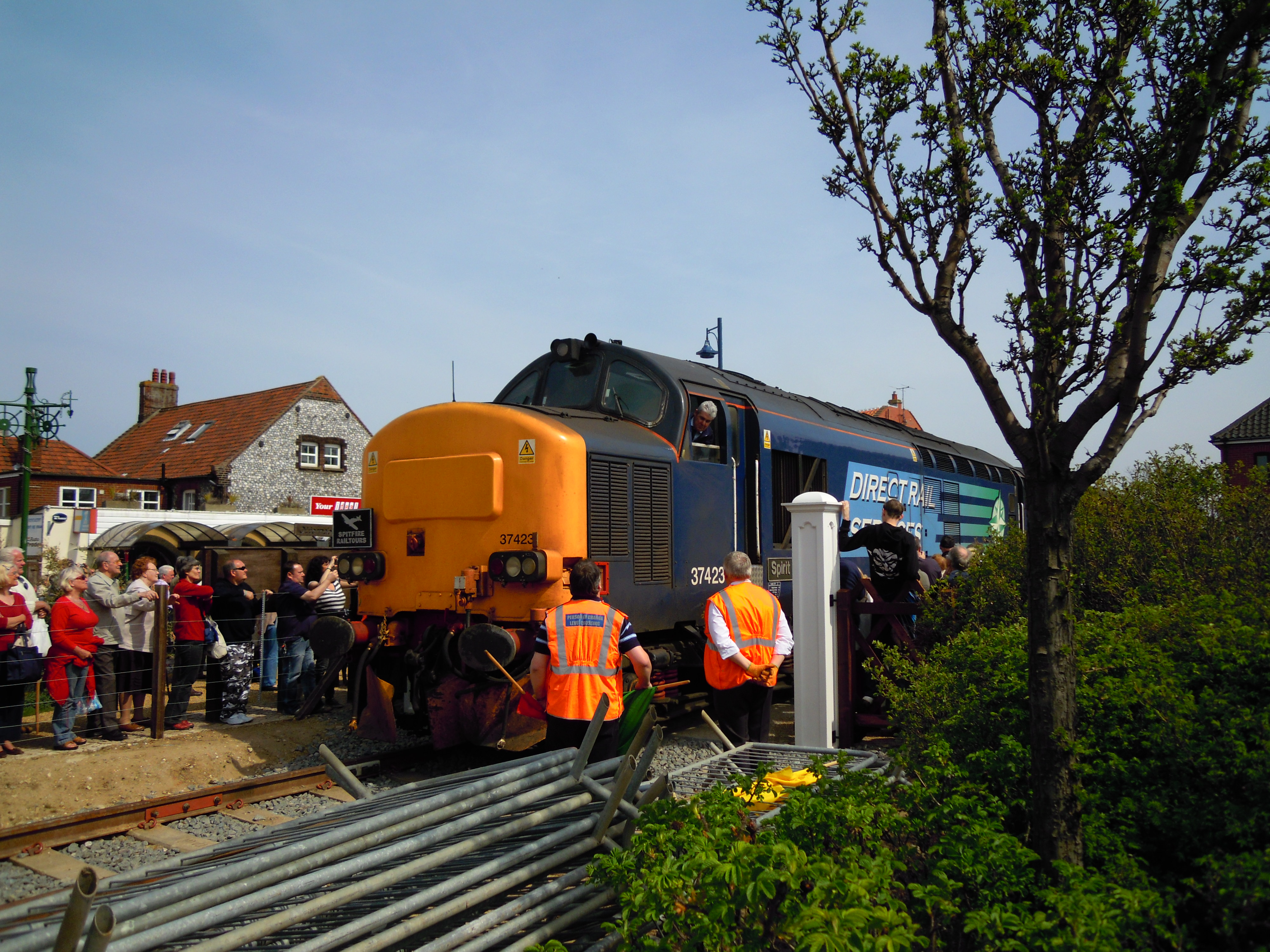
The Sheringham level crossing in use in 2010

The line is double-track from Norwich to Hoveton & Wroxham, where it becomes single-track with a passing loop at North Walsham, and two platforms at Cromer also allowing passing. The line is not electrified; it has a loading gauge of W8 between Norwich and Roughton Road and W6 from Roughton Road to Sheringham. The maximum speed is 75 miles per hour (121 km/h).

The line was re-signalled in 2000, leading to the closure of a number of mechanical signal boxes and control moving to a panel at the Trowse Swing Bridge control room. This saw the end of one of the few remaining sections of single-track main line controlled by tokens. The Cromer signal box has been preserved.

== Proposed developments ==
=== Rackheath station ===
A new station is proposed as part of the Rackheath eco-town. The building of the town may also mean a short freight spur being built to transport fuel to fire an on-site power station. The plans for the settlement received approval from the government in 2009.
