= North Walsham Town railway station =

Former railway station in Norfolk, England

Coordinates: 52.8181°N 1.3857°E

North Walsham Town
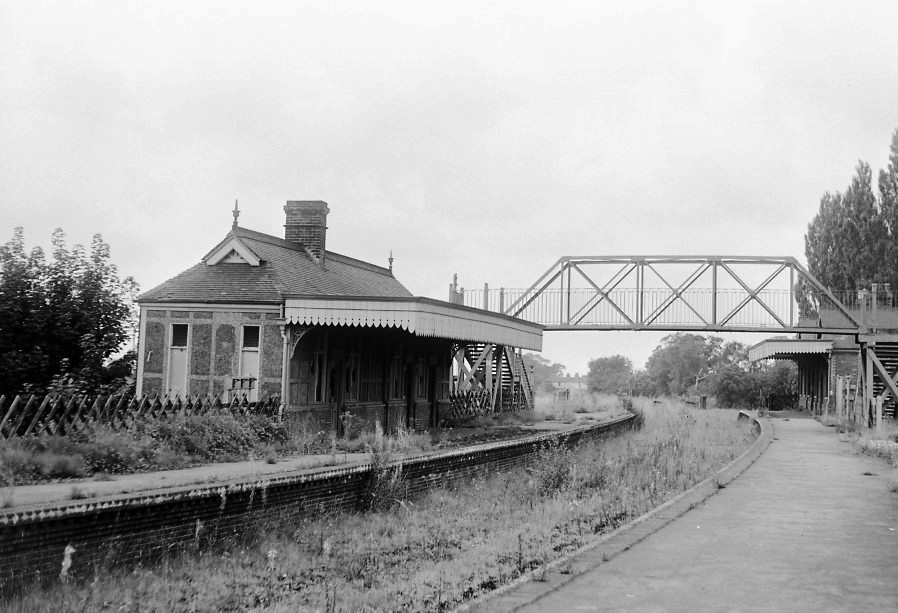
- The site of the station in the 1960s

General information
- Location: North Walsham, North Norfolk, Norfolk; England
- Grid reference: TG282299
- Platforms: 2

Other information
- Status: Disused

History
- Pre-grouping: Yarmouth & North Norfolk Railway; Midland and Great Northern Joint Railway
- Post-grouping: Midland and Great Northern Joint Railway; Eastern Region of British Railways

Key dates
- 13 June 1881: Opened (North Walsham)
- 27 September 1948: Renamed (North Walsham Town)
- 2 March 1959: Closed to passengers
- 1 January 1966: Closed to freight
Location

North Walsham Town railway station was a station in North Walsham, Norfolk. It served the now closed Midland and Great Northern Joint Railway lines to Melton Constable via Aylsham, Melton Constable via Mundesley and Sheringham, and Great Yarmouth via Potter Heigham. It was closed in 1959 when the rest of the line was shut by British Railways, as it was considered unprofitable.

There was another station in the town, on the Great Eastern Railway network historically known as 'North Walsham Main' but now simply known as North Walsham railway station.

Former Services

Preceding station	Disused railways	Following station
Felmingham	Midland and Great Northern; Yarmouth Line	Honing
Paston and Knapton	Norfolk and Suffolk; Cromer Line	Terminus
