= North Walsham railway station =

Railway station in Norfolk, England

Coordinates: 52.8169°N 1.3846°E

North Walsham
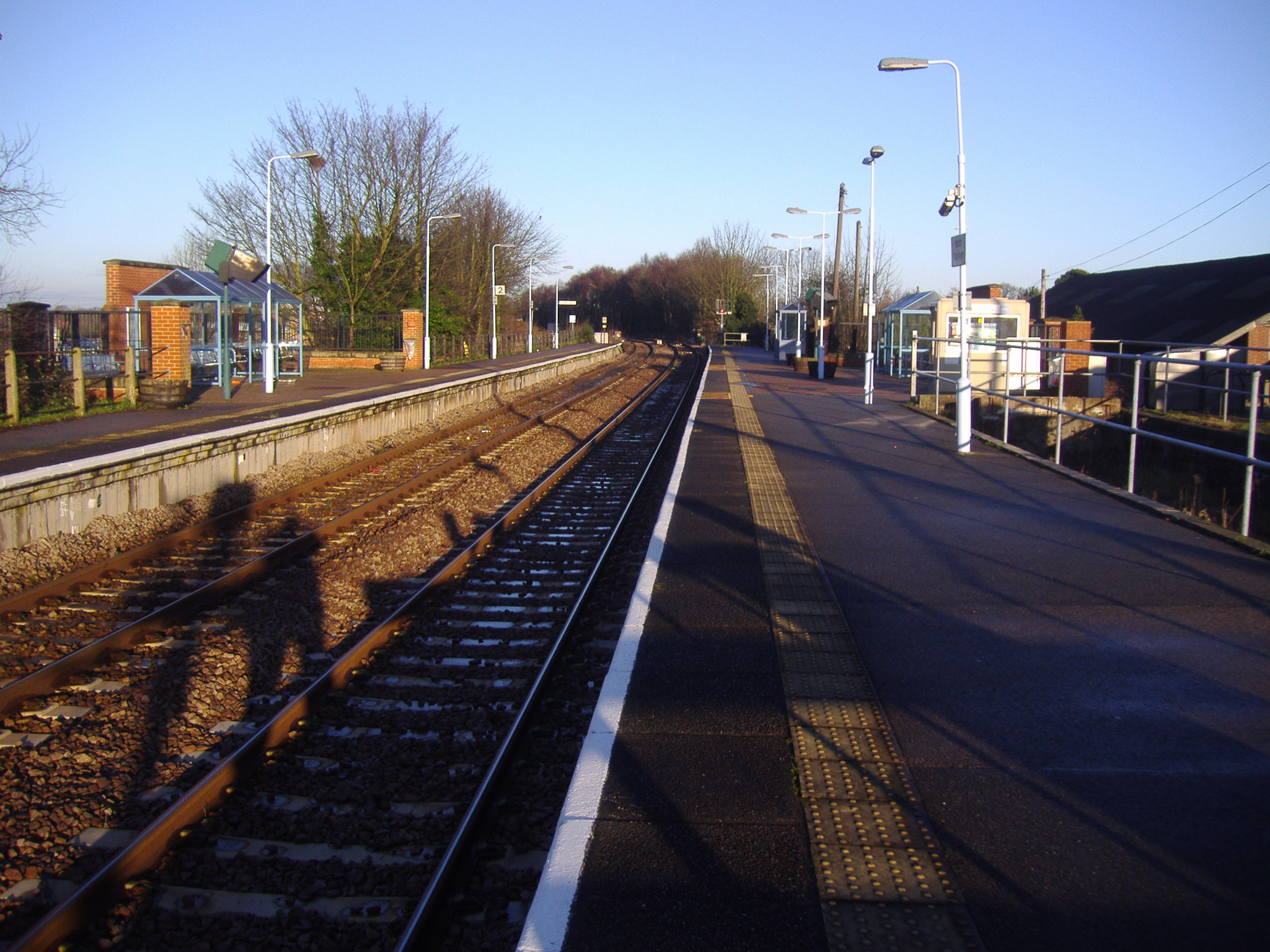

General information
- Location: North Walsham, North Norfolk; England
- Grid reference: TG281297
- Managed by: Greater Anglia
- Platforms: 2

Other information
- Station code: NWA
- Classification: DfT category F1

Key dates
- 20 October 1874: Opened as North Walsham
- 27 September 1948: Renamed North Walsham Main
- ?: Renamed North Walsham

Passengers
- 2020/21: ▼54,894
- 2021/22: ▲0.221 million
- 2022/23: ▲0.243 million
- 2023/24: ▼0.221 million
- 2024/25: ▲0.228 million
Location
Notes
- Passenger statistics from the Office of Rail and Road

North Walsham railway station (formerly known as North Walsham Main) is on the Bittern Line in Norfolk, England, serving the town of North Walsham. It is 16 miles (26 km) down the line from Norwich, between Worstead to the south and Gunton to the north. Train services are operated by Greater Anglia.

== Description ==
Historically, the town was served by two adjacent railway stations; this existing station dating from 1874 served the Great Eastern Railway from Norwich to Cromer High, while a nearby station named North Walsham Town served the former lines to Melton Constable (either via Aylsham or via Mundesley-on-Sea and Sheringham) and Great Yarmouth (via Potter Heigham). North Walsham Town closed on 28 February 1959, with the "Main" station renamed simply "North Walsham".

In 2010 the station signs were changed to read "North Walsham, home of Paston College".

The station is the site of the only passing loop on the route (although trains can also pass in the station at Cromer), which has been worked remotely from Norwich since the line was re-signalled in 2000. The station goods yard, meanwhile, is the last operational freight location on the line; GB Railfreight dispatches regular bulk trainloads of petrochemicals (gas condensate piped in from various offshore North Sea gas fields) from here to Harwich International. Aggregate traffic (in the form of spent railway ballast) has also been handled here in the past.

== Services ==
All services at North Walsham are operated by Greater Anglia using Class 755 BMUs.

The typical service on all days of the week is one train per hour in each direction between Norwich and Sheringham via Cromer.

Preceding station	National Rail	Following station
Worstead	Greater Anglia Bittern Line	Gunton
