= Overstrand railway station =

Disused railway station in Norfolk, England

Coordinates: 52.9149°N 1.3357°E

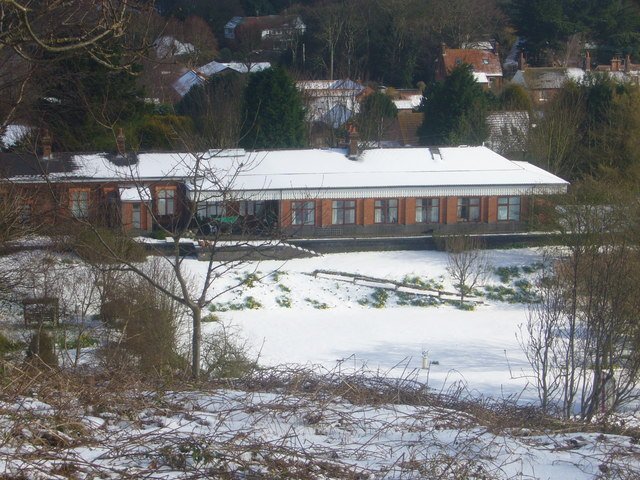
The station building in 2008

Overstrand railway station was a station in North Norfolk on the Norfolk and Suffolk Joint Railway, serving the settlement of Overstrand. It opened on 3 August 1906 and was much used in the summer months by holidaymakers.

The station was host to a LNER camping coach in 1938 and 1939. Two coaches were also positioned here by Eastern Region of British Railways in 1952.

The station closed when this part of the line closed to passengers on 7 April 1953. Since 1959 the station has become a private house.

| Preceding station | Disused railways | Following station |
|---|---|---|
| Cromer Links Halt | Norfolk and Suffolk; Cromer Line | Sidestrand Halt |
