= Overstrand =

Village in Norfolk, England

Coordinates: 52.91°N 1.36°E

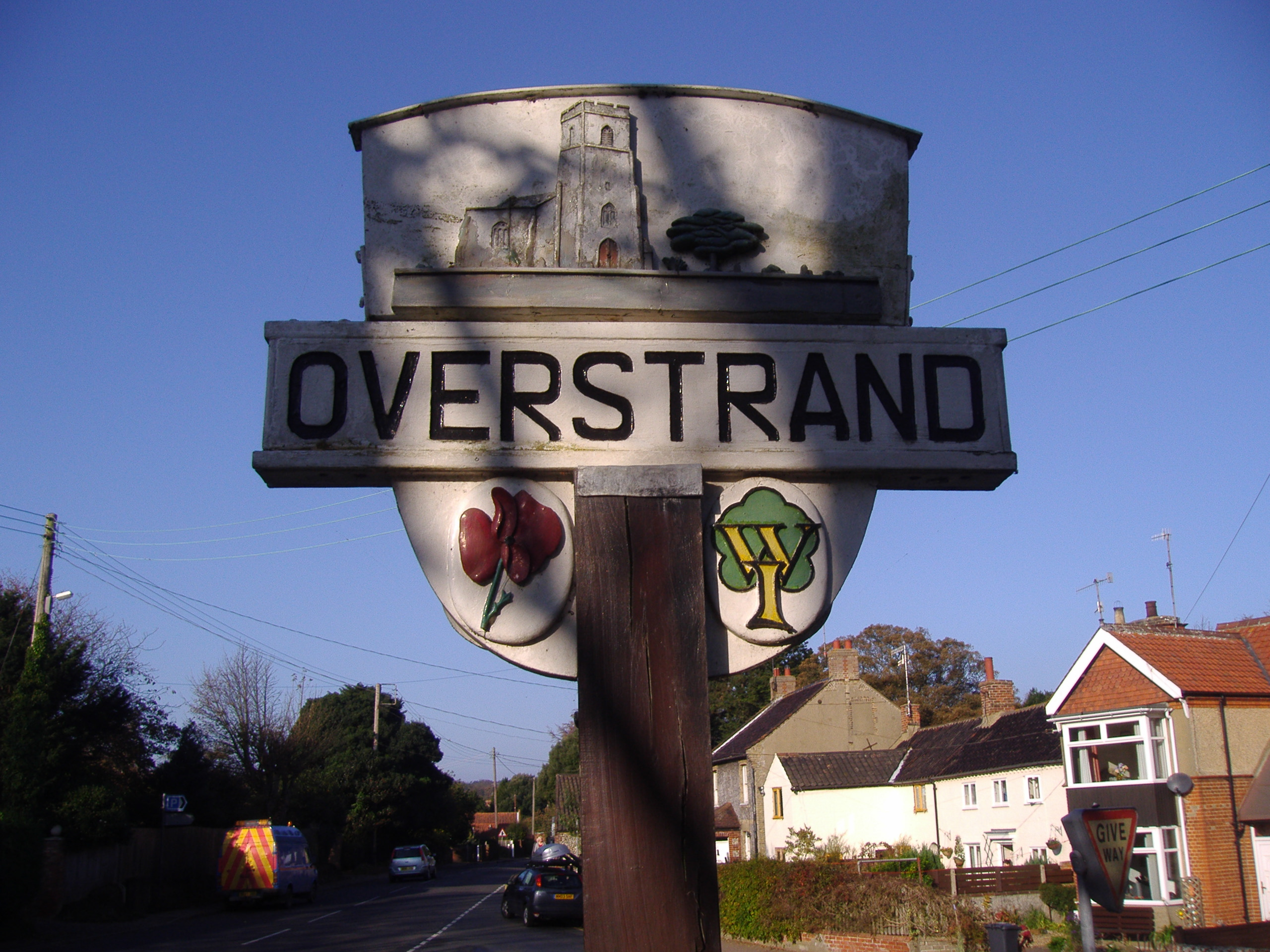
- The Village sign

- Location within Norfolk
- Area: 0.714 sq mi (1.85 km^{2})
- Population: 1,030 (parish, 2011 census)
  - Density: 1,443/sq mi (557/km^{2})
- OS grid reference: TG2441
  - London: 116 mi (187 km)
- Civil parish: Overstrand
- District: North Norfolk
- Shire county: Norfolk
- Region: East
- Country: England
- Sovereign state: United Kingdom
- Post town: CROMER
- Postcode district: NR27
- Dialling code: 01263
- Police: Norfolk
- Fire: Norfolk
- Ambulance: East of England
- UK Parliament: North Norfolk
- Website: overstrandparishcouncil.org.uk

Overstrand is a village (population 1,030) on the north coast of Norfolk in England, two miles east of Cromer. It was once a modest fishing station, with all or part of the fishing station being known as Beck Hythe. In the latter part of the 19th century it was catapulted into prominence, and became known as “the village of millionaires”.

== History ==
The village's name means 'ridge shore', or perhaps 'narrow shore' to contrast with nearby Sidestrand.

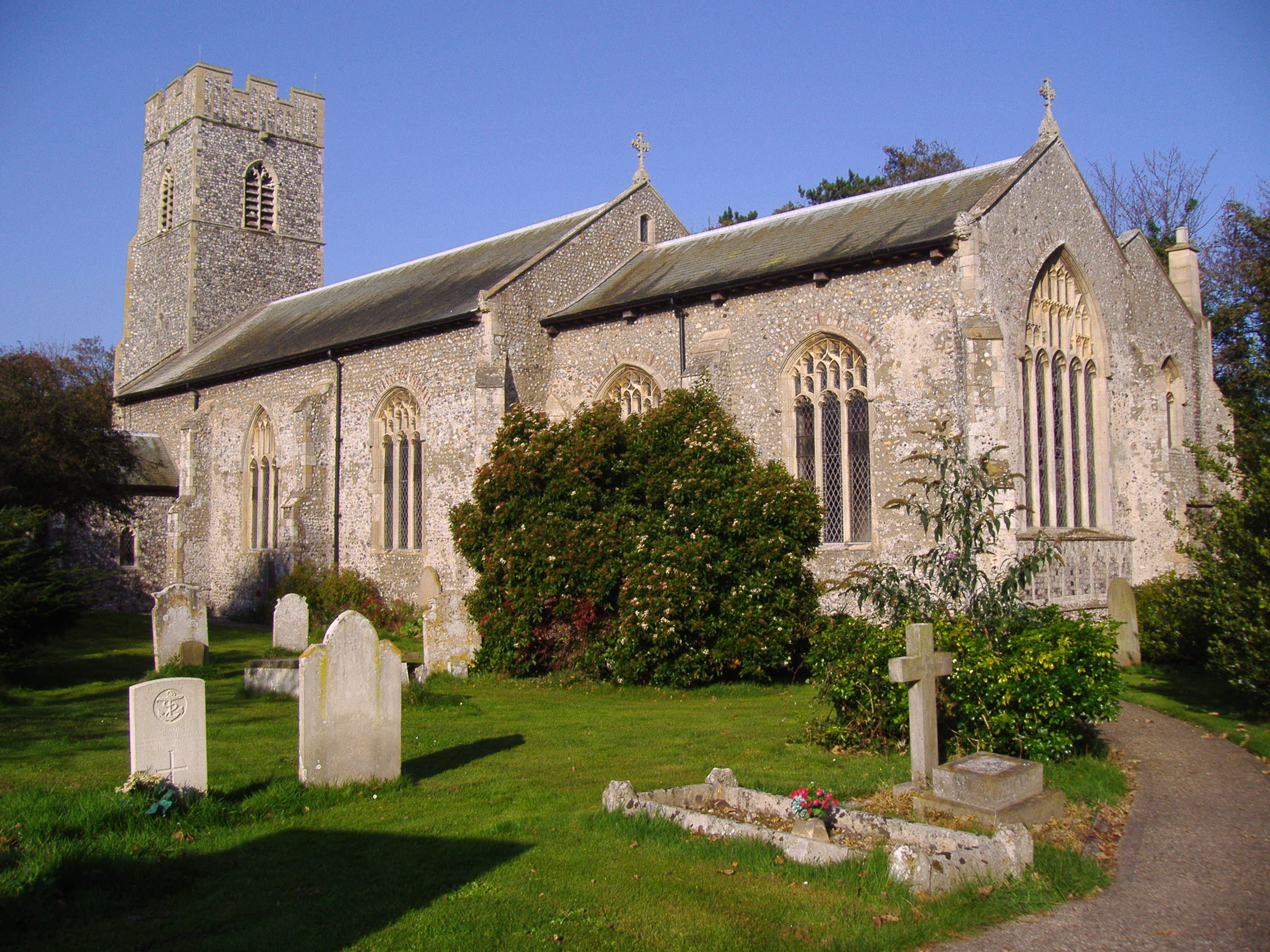
The Church of St Martin

The London journalist and travel writer Clement Scott came to Overstrand in 1883, christened the area ‘’Poppyland’’, and wrote about the church tower on the cliff edge and its “Garden of Sleep”. While in Overstrand he stayed at the Mill House with miller Alfred Jermy and his daughter Louie, who became “the Maid of the Mill” in his articles about ‘’Poppyland’’.

Scott had many London contacts in the theatrical world, and his writings led a number of them and others from London society to come to Overstrand. Some bought land in the village and had houses built there, and for a while the village was the place to visit. A large hotel was built on the cliff edge, though this slid into the sea in the 1950s.

The Edwardian architect Sir Edwin Lutyens worked at Overstrand, designing Overstrand Hall for Charles William Mills, 2nd Baron Hillingdon, The Pleasaunce for Cyril Flower, 1st Baron Battersea and the Methodist Church. The large houses of the gentry have largely passed from private ownership to other uses.

Overstrand railway station was on the Norfolk and Suffolk Joint Railway between Cromer and North Walsham. It is now closed.

The Overstrand biplane bomber was named after the village, having been made at the Boulton & Paul aircraft factory in Norwich in the early 1930s.

== In popular culture ==
Season 1, episode 2 of the BBC TV series Screen Two was titled "Poppyland" (1985). Directed by John Madden, it took place in Overstrand and tells the story of Clement Scott in his travels there.

== Coastal erosion ==
As with much of the Norfolk coast, erosion was and continues to be a major problem. Clifton Way is an experimental site; its sea defences include riprap (at £1,300 a boulder, predominantly shipped from Norway), wooden groynes, revetments, gabions and offshore reefs. The cliffs of soft boulder clay slump because of the water running through the clay, and the resulting material on the beach is removed by the succeeding high tides. In the neighbouring village of Sidestrand, the church was moved back from the cliff edge in the 19th century, though the tower of the church was left standing on the cliff top.

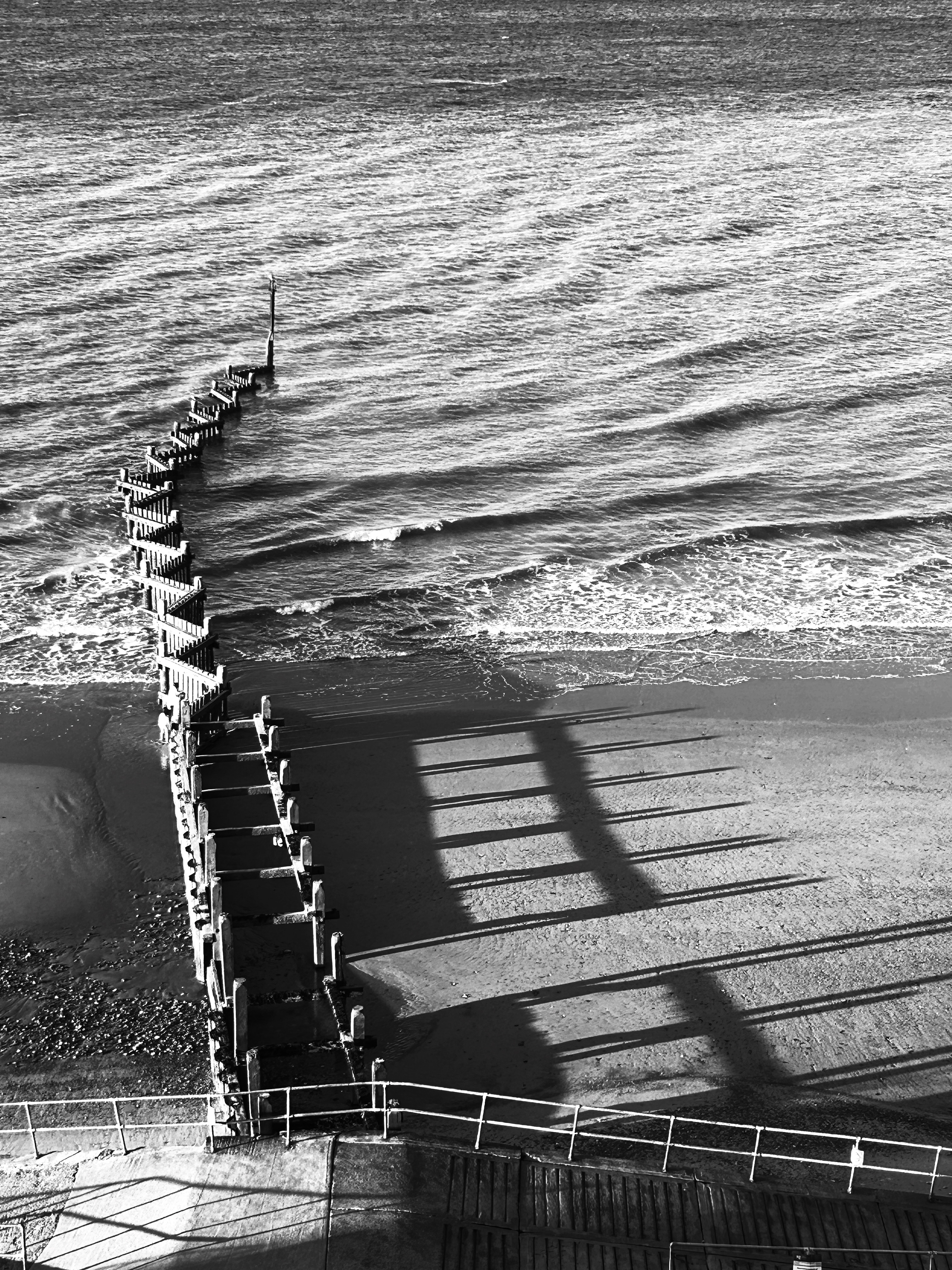
View from the top of the eroded cliff path.

== Sport and leisure ==
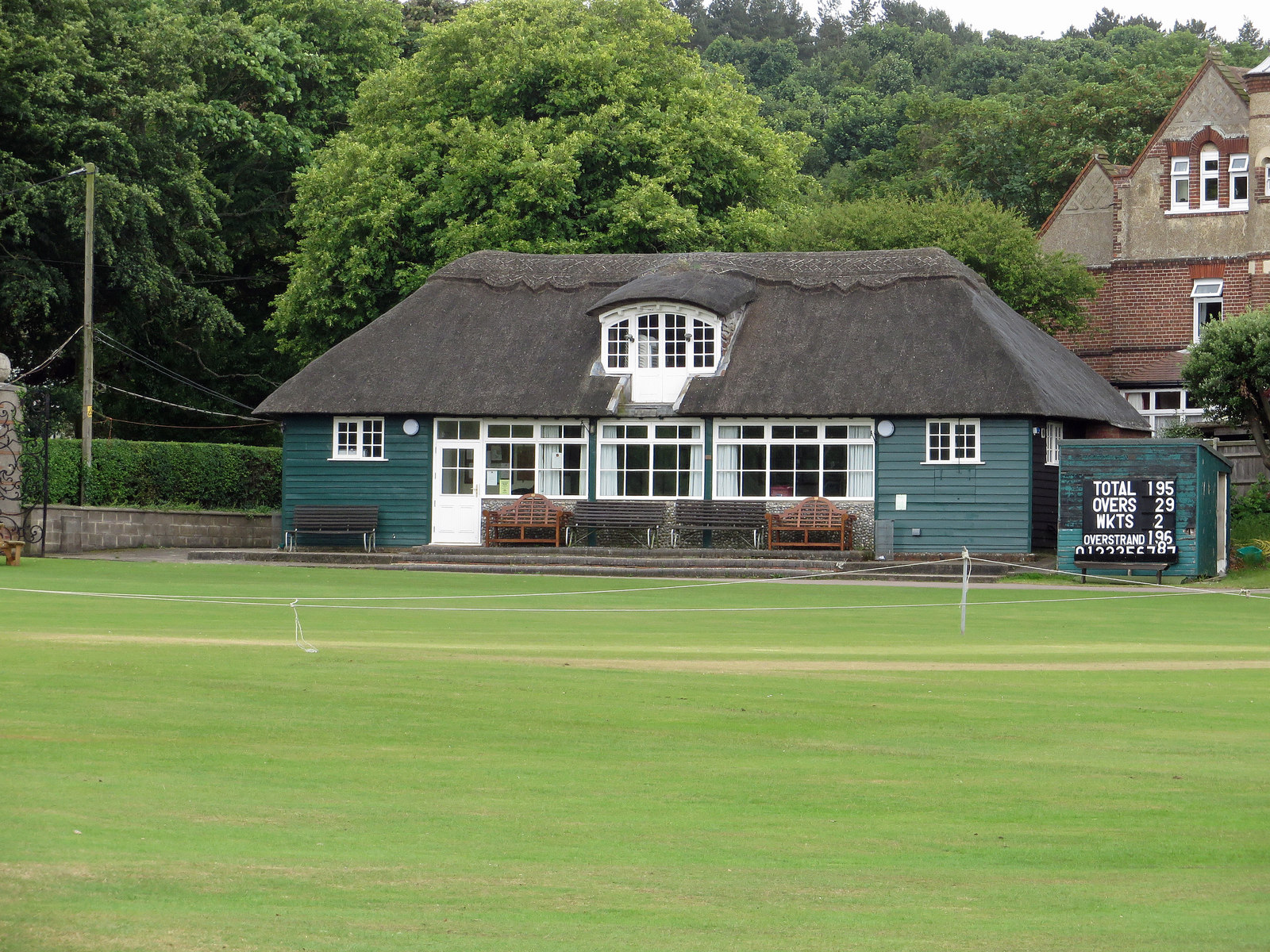
Overstrand Cricket Club (2014)

Overstrand Cricket Club is an English amateur cricket club. The club was established in 1946 and is based on Overstrand Sports Ground. Overstrand CC have 2 Saturday senior XI teams that compete in the Norfolk Cricket League, and a Sunday 1st XI side.

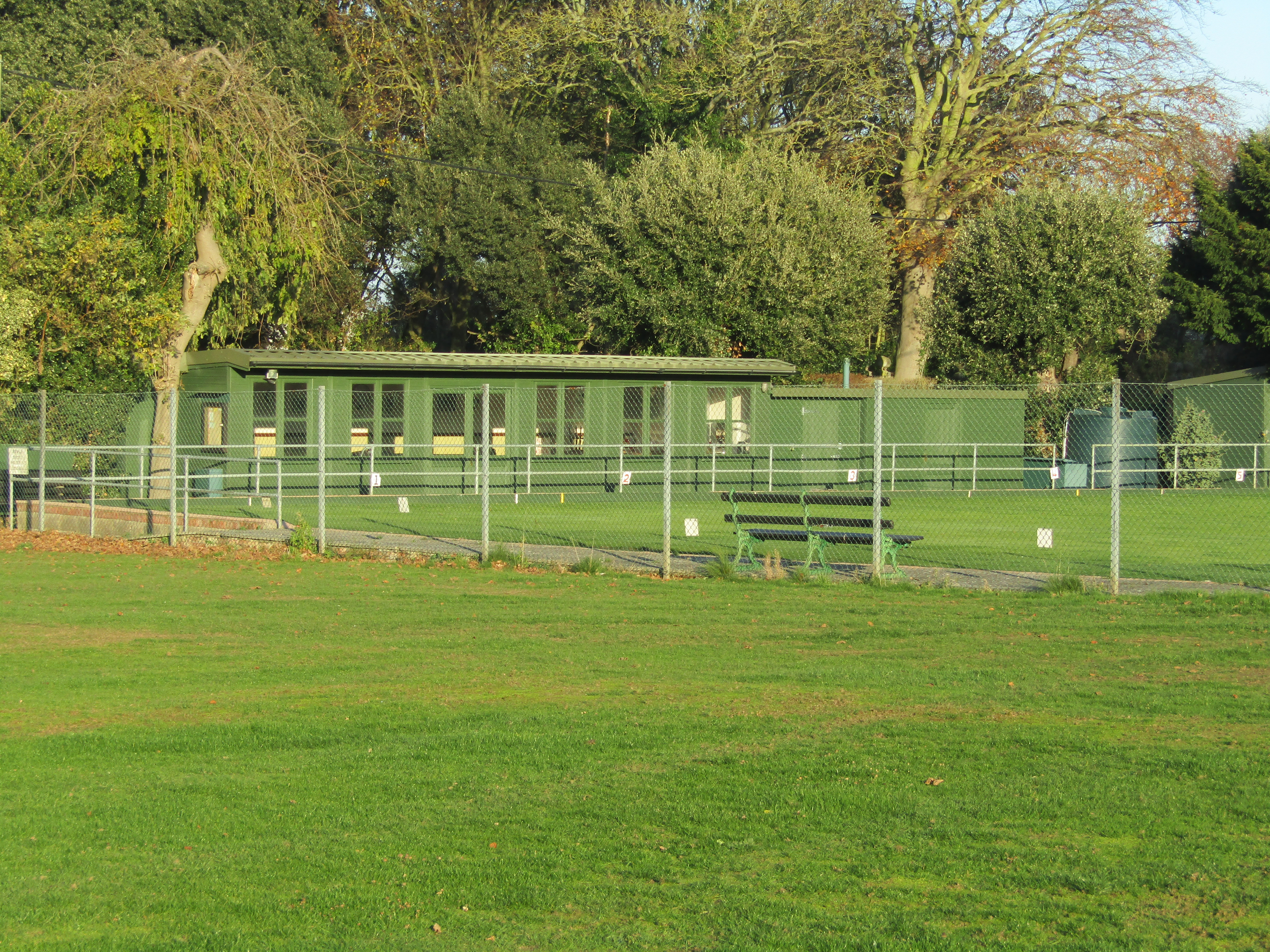
Overstrand Bowls Club (2018)

Overstrand Bowls Club is also situated on Overstrand Sports Ground, but its origins predate the current site to at least the 1920s. The club participates in two leagues: The Norfolk Federation County League and the Norfolk Afternoon League.

== Media ==
Poppyland Radio, a digital community radio station for North Norfolk, broadcasts from the town. Launched in February 2022, it claimed a silver medal at the 2022 Community Radio Awards.
