= Cromer High railway station =

Former railway station in England

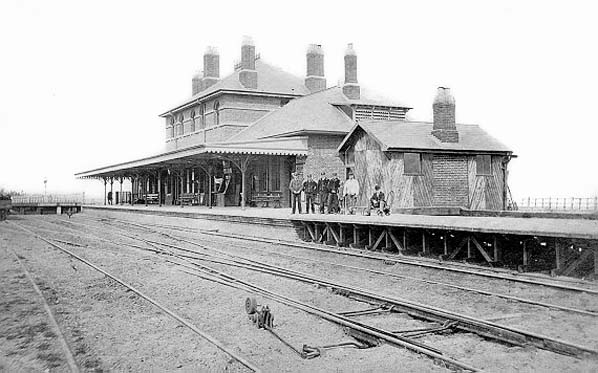
Cromer High (then just "Cromer") shortly after opening

Cromer High railway station was the first station opened in Cromer, Norfolk, in England. It is situated to the south on the outskirts of the town on a steep escarpment. Built initially by the short-lived East Norfolk Railway, the station (along with the line) was incorporated into the Great Eastern Railway, who had operated the services from the beginning. It served as the terminus of Great Eastern Railway services from London and Norwich. Initially named Cromer on opening, it was renamed Cromer High on 27 September 1948.

The station opened on 26 March 1877. Because of steep gradients near the town, the station was built in open fields some distance from the town itself. The station resembled in design Chingford railway station, opened in 1878, another GER branch line terminus.

== Closure ==
On 23 July 1906 a connection was opened between the line to Cromer High and the Midland and Great Northern Joint Railway line between Melton Constable and Cromer Beach stations, allowing through trains from Norwich to run to Cromer Beach. As Cromer Beach was far more conveniently sited in the centre of the town, passenger numbers using Cromer High dropped substantially, although it remained in heavy usage as a freight depot. On 20 September 1954 passenger services ceased at Cromer High, with all traffic diverted to Cromer Beach (renamed "Cromer" in 1969). The station remained open as a freight terminus until 7 March 1960, but was then closed completely and the station demolished. Despite the loss of passenger revenue, the bar attached to the station did not close until 1957. Part of the station site has been redeveloped for housing, but much remains undeveloped; although derelict and overgrown, the former station approach road is also still present. North Norfolk Council is considering converting the station into a site for the use of Travellers.

Cromer High station was situated a short distance away from the Cromer Tunnel, Norfolk's only standard gauge railway tunnel, connecting the Sheringham and Mundesley lines. Although disused since services ceased in 1953, the tunnel remains intact.

Preceding station	Disused railways	Following station
Gunton; Line closed, station open	Great Eastern Railway; East Norfolk Railway	Terminus

== See also ==
- Railway stations in Cromer
