= Mundesley-on-Sea railway station =

Disused railway station in Norfolk, England

Coordinates: 52.8769°N 1.4299°E

Mundesley-on-Sea
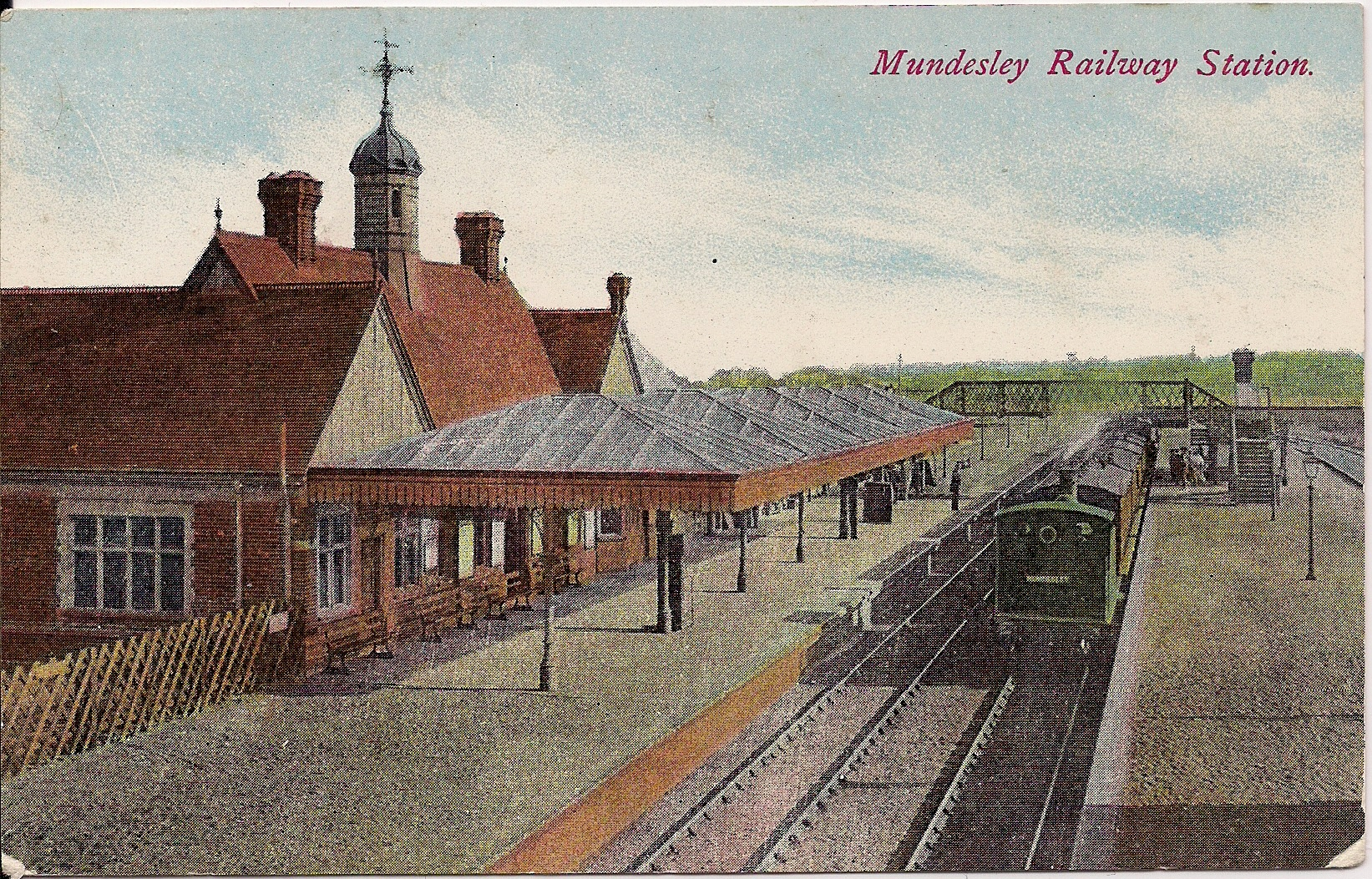

General information
- Location: Mundesley, North Norfolk, Norfolk; England
- Grid reference: TG309366
- Platforms: 3

Other information
- Status: Disused

History
- Original company: Norfolk and Suffolk Joint Railway
- Pre-grouping: Norfolk and Suffolk Joint Railway
- Post-grouping: Norfolk and Suffolk Joint Railway; Eastern Region of British Railways

Key dates
- 1 July 1898: Opened
- 5 October 1964: Closed to passengers
- 28 December 1964: Closed to freight
Location

Mundesley railway station was a railway station on the Norfolk and Suffolk Joint Railway in Mundesley, Norfolk. It opened on 1 July 1898.

The station was host to a LNER camping coach from 1938 to 1939. Two coaches were positioned here by Eastern Region of British Railways in 1952, then four coaches from 1953 to 1958, then ten for 1959 reducing to six coaches from 1960 to 1964, 3 coaches remained for the 1965 season despite the station having closed.

On 7 April 1953 the station became the terminus of the line from North Walsham when the route to Cromer closed. In 1964 the remainder of the route was closed.

| Preceding station | Disused railways | Following station |
|---|---|---|
| Trimingham | Norfolk and Suffolk; Cromer Line | Paston & Knapton |
