= Sheringham railway station =

Railway station in Norfolk, England

Coordinates: 52.941°N 1.211°E

Sheringham
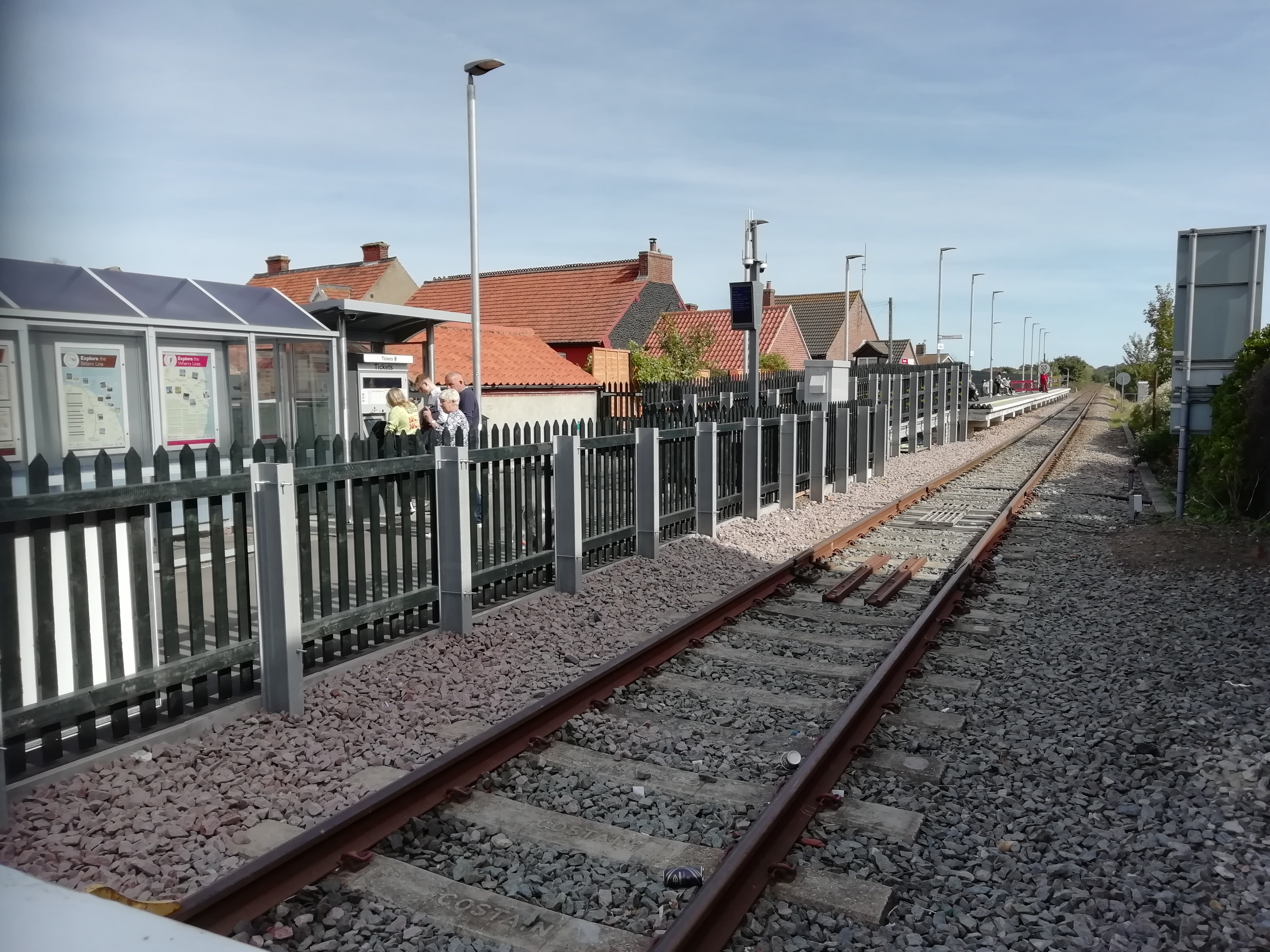
- The platform at Sheringham

General information
- Location: Sheringham, North Norfolk, England
- Grid reference: TG156430
- Managed by: Greater Anglia
- Platforms: 1

Other information
- Station code: SHM
- Classification: DfT category F1

History
- Opened: 2 January 1967
- Original company: British Rail

Passengers
- 2020/21: ▼53,214
- 2021/22: ▲0.234 million
- 2022/23: ▼0.232 million
- 2023/24: ▲0.245 million
- 2024/25: ▲0.268 million
Location
Notes
- Passenger statistics from the Office of Rail and Road

Sheringham railway station is the northern terminus of the Bittern Line; serving the town of Sheringham, in Norfolk, England. It lies 30 miles 22 chains (30.28 mi; 48.7 km) down the line from Norwich, including the reversal at Cromer. The station is situated on the southern edge of the town centre, but within walking distance of the beach. It is currently managed by Greater Anglia, which also operates all trains serving it.

== History ==
The current station was opened by British Rail on 2 January 1967, replacing the town's original station opened by the Midland and Great Northern Joint Railway, which is located across the road, enabling the closure of the level crossing there. The original station subsequently became the terminus of the North Norfolk Railway heritage line.

At the time of opening, the railway itself was listed for closure; the basic timber platform provided was intended to cover only the last few months of the line's operation.

=== Rebuild ===
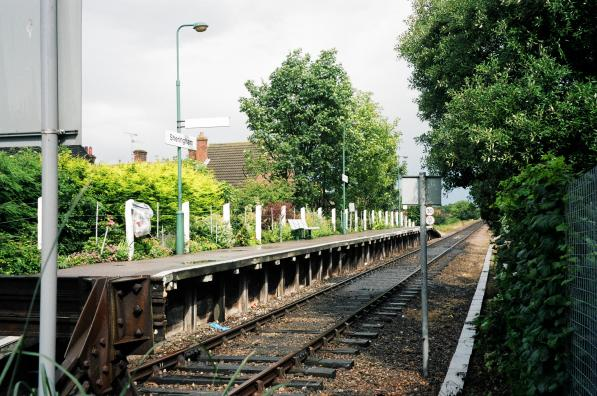
A view of the old platform, intended as a temporary structure when the line was scheduled for closure. This photograph was taken before the restoration of the level crossing, showing the buffer stops that marked the limit of operation at that time.

With the pending introduction of longer Stadler FLIRT Class 755 units by Abellio Greater Anglia, the temporary station platform was finally scheduled to be replaced. The replacement platform would be doubled in length to 80 metres and fitted with improved lighting and shelter. The station was due to be closed between Sunday 31 March and Sunday 5 May 2019 for the works to be completed. In April, it was reported that the reopening of the station would be delayed due to a fault with supplied components. Further delays were then caused by issues with signalling. The station finally reopened in late May 2019.

== Services ==
All services at Sheringham are operated by Greater Anglia using Class 755 bi-mode multiple units.

The typical service on the Bittern Line is one train per hour to Norwich, via Cromer.

Preceding station	National Rail	Following station
Terminus	Greater Anglia Bittern Line	West Runton
Heritage railways
Change for the North Norfolk Railway at Sheringham

== Connection with the North Norfolk Railway ==
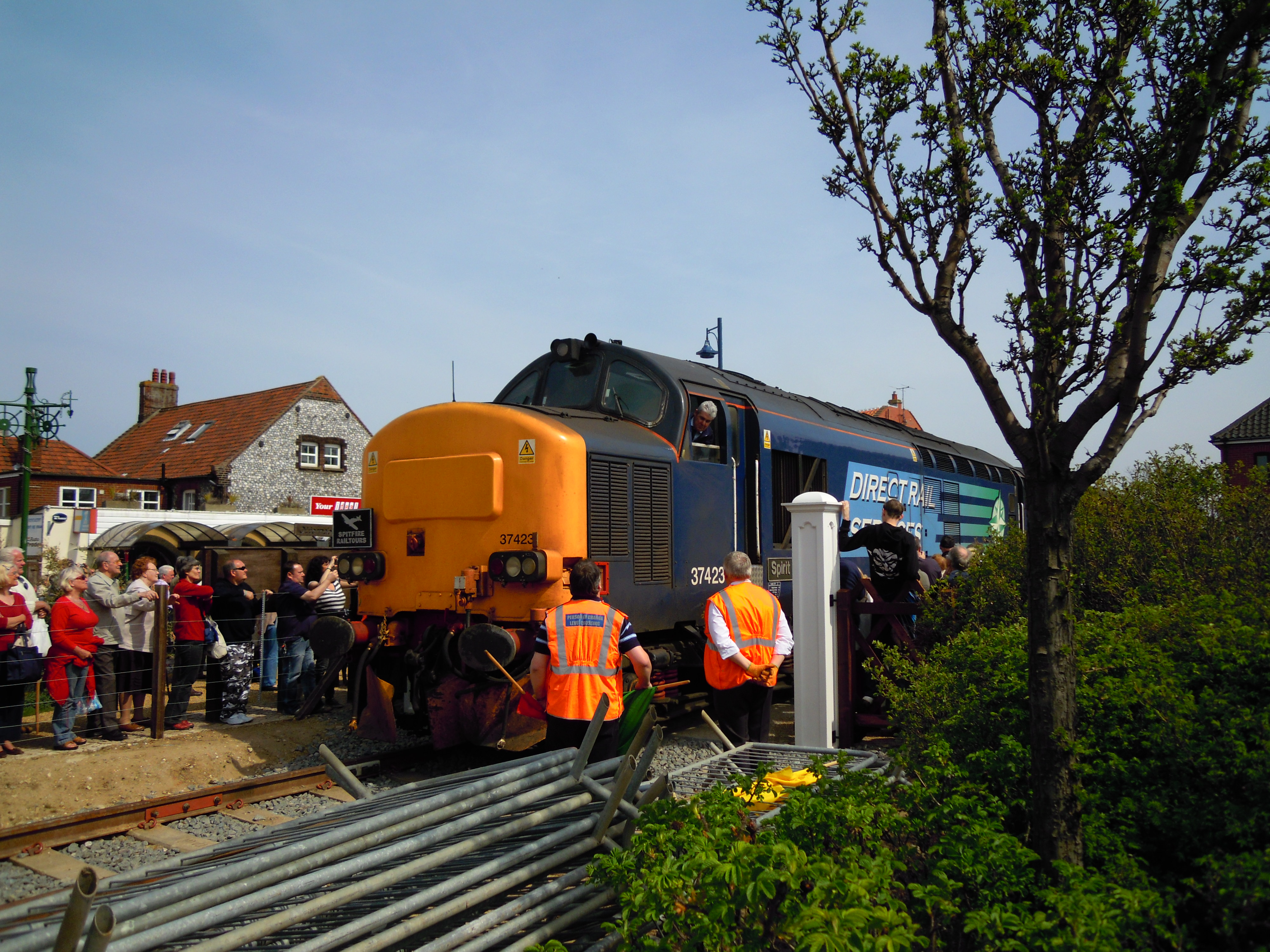
The second train to use the new level crossing in April 2010

Between 2007 and 2010, work was undertaken to reinstate the original level crossing across the road to allow trains from Norwich to run onto the North Norfolk Railway (NNR) heritage line tracks. In December 2007, the BBC reported that Network Rail supported the plans to allow occasional crossing of the tracks for trains onto the heritage route. Work began in January 2010, with the moving of the NNR headshunt to slew into line with the National Rail section. The link was reinstated in March 2010, when the first passenger train over the new crossing was hauled by steam locomotive Oliver Cromwell from London Liverpool Street. Occasional uses by charter trains and visiting rolling stock are anticipated not to exceed 12 times a year.

The NNR also operate a number of dining trains over the entire surviving section of the M&GN, between Holt and Cromer, during summer months. Services began in 2016, working in partnership with the North Yorkshire Moors Railway, which was already a licensed operator with Network Rail; these trains do not stop at the national railway station.
