= Cromer railway station =

Railway station in Norfolk, England

Coordinates: 52.9305°N 1.2926°E

Cromer
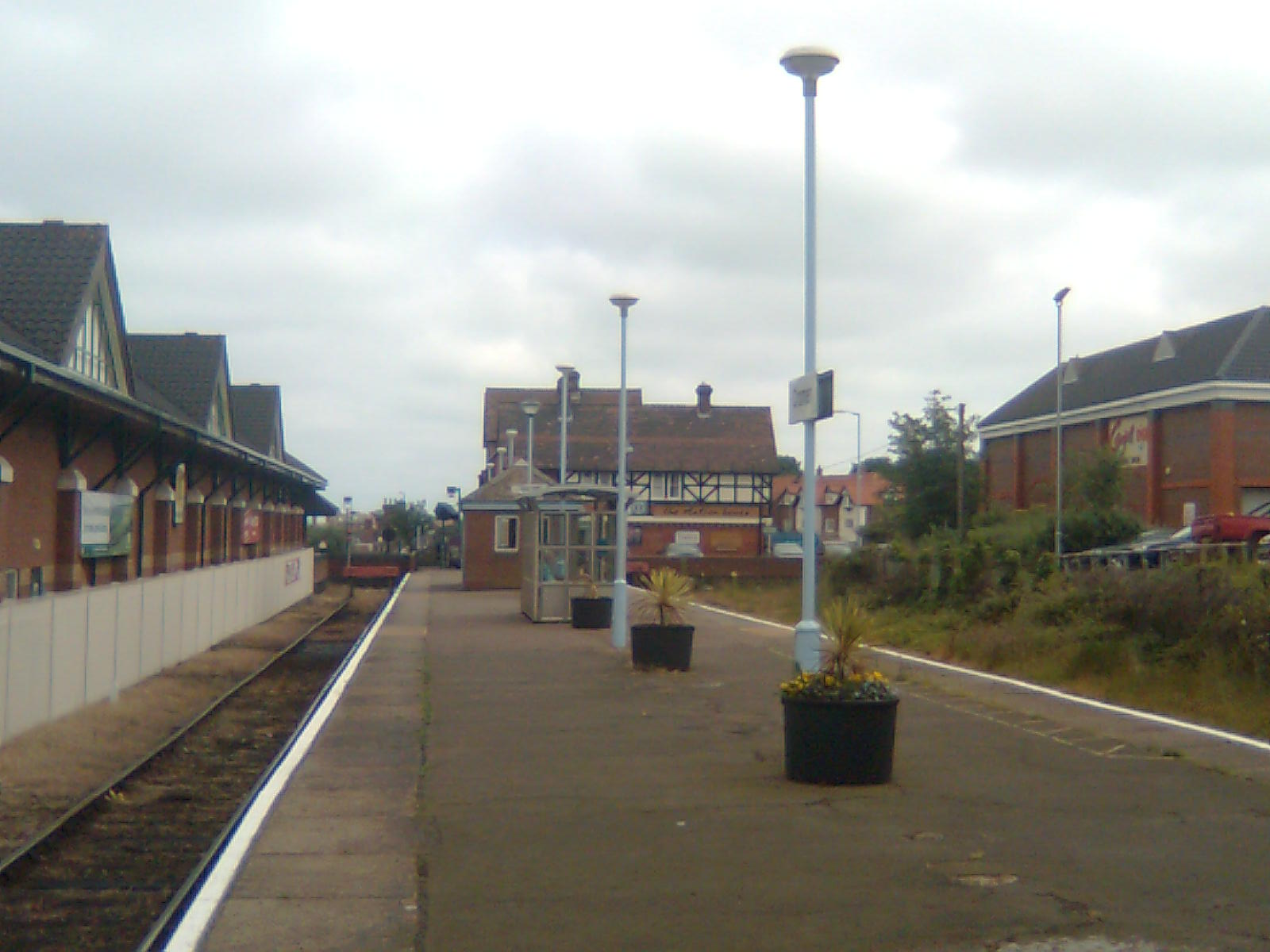
- Cromer railway station, facing towards the town centre

General information
- Location: Cromer, North Norfolk; England
- Grid reference: TG214420
- Manager: Greater Anglia
- Platforms: 2

Other information
- Station code: CMR

Key dates
- 16 June 1887: Opened as Cromer Beach
- 20 October 1969: Renamed Cromer

Passengers
- 2020/21: ▼60,352
- 2021/22: ▲0.213 million
- 2022/23: ▲0.244 million
- 2023/24: ▲0.246 million
- 2024/25: ▲0.249 million
Location
Notes
- Passenger statistics from the Office of Rail and Road

Cromer is a railway station which serves the coastal town of Cromer, in the English county of Norfolk. It is a stop on the Bittern Line between Norwich and Sheringham. The station is located 26 miles 52 chains (42.9 km) down the line from Norwich.

== History ==
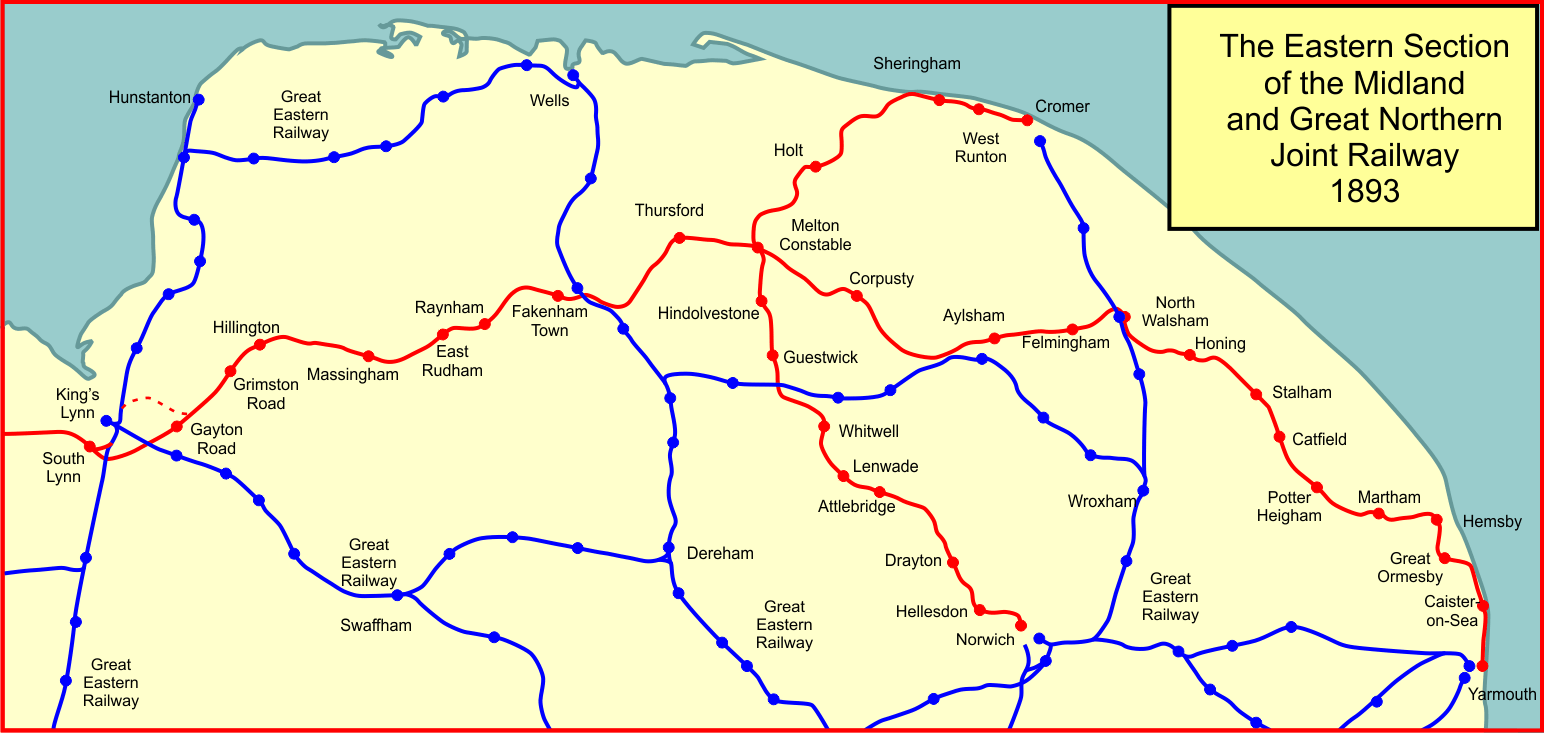
The eastern section of the later M&GNJR

The station opened as Cromer Beach on 16 June 1887. As the Midland and Great Northern Joint Railway (M&GNJR) line approached Cromer from the west, following the coastal clifftops, it avoided the steep escarpment which had prevented the earlier line from Norwich running all the way into the town. Consequently, it became possible to build a far more conveniently located station, near to the town centre and the beach.

It was renamed Cromer on 20 October 1969, following the closure of Cromer High station in 1954.

Cromer is one of only two former Midland and Great Northern Joint Railway stations to remain operational on the National Rail network; the other being the neighbouring West Runton. Sheringham and Weybourne are the other two surviving M&GNJR stations; both are still served today on the heritage North Norfolk Railway (NNR).

=== Buildings ===
To cater to the heavy leisure traffic at the end of the 19th century, Cromer Beach had a large station building in a half-timbered style, and a large goods yard. The station originally included a bar, which was closed in 1966. Following the introduction of conductor-guard working, the ticket facilities were no longer needed and the building fell into disuse; it was renovated and reopened as a public house in 1998. A large supermarket was built on the site of the goods yards in 1991. In January 2018, it was reported that the NNR were considering using the building if it were to run services to Cromer.

== Services ==
All services at Cromer are operated by Greater Anglia using Class 755 BMUs.

The typical service on all days of the week is one train per hour in each direction between Norwich and Sheringham. Due to its location, trains reverse at the station before continuing to Norwich or Sheringham.

In 1997 a single daily through train to and from London Liverpool Street to Sheringham via Cromer was introduced but was discontinued due to low usage.

| Preceding station | National Rail | Following station |
|---|---|---|
| West Runton | Greater Anglia Bittern Line | train reverses |
| Roughton Road | Greater Anglia Bittern Line | train reverses |
| | Disused railways | |
| West Runton | Midland and Great Northern Joint Railway Cromer Branch | Terminus |
| Terminus | Norfolk and Suffolk Joint Railway North Walsham to Cromer | Cromer Links Halt Line and station closed |

== See also ==
- Railway stations in Cromer
