= Network Rail Certification Body =

Network Certification Body Limited
- Type: Private limited company
- Industry: UK Notified Bodies, Conformity assessment, Rail Transport
- Founded: 2012
- Headquarters: Milton Keynes, Buckinghamshire, United Kingdom
- Key people: Sam Brunker (Managing Director); Mark Thickbroom (Finance and Commercial Director)
- Services: Conformity assessment
- Number of employees: 56 (May 2020)
- Website: net-cert.co.uk

Network Rail Certification Body Limited (commonly known as Network Certification Body or NCB) is a private limited company providing conformity assessment and consulting services to the rail industry. The company is headquartered in Milton Keynes, United Kingdom and was founded in 2012 as a subsidiary of Network Rail.

== History ==
Established in April 2012, NCB was formed to provide conformity assessment services to the rail industry. The organisation has extensive long-standing experience of working alongside rail industry projects from wagon alterations through to piecemeal infrastructure upgrades to new pieces of rail infrastructure such as High Speed 1. Shortly after its creation, three Network Rail teams were transferred to MCB, consisting of an existing UKAS accredited Notified Body and Rail Safety and Standards Board accredited vehicle acceptance body, an infrastructure conformance team delivering independent competent person safety verification under the Railways and Other Guided Transport Systems (Safety) Regulations 2006 (ROGS), and a private wagons registration agreement team providing support to owners and operators of private wagons for use on the railway.

While NCB is a wholly owned subsidiary of Network Rail Infrastructure Ltd, it is intentionally operated as an independent agency of its parent organization as to avoid any conflict of interests occurring. This independence is routinely reviewed by external auditors. NCB offers its services to any organization carrying out works on railway infrastructure and vehicles that need to comply with UK rail safety legislation.

In 2021, NCB was reportedly achieving a turnover of just under £7 million per annum. At the time, the organisation was reportedly focused on, in addition to performing its traditional activities on behalf of Network Rail, increasing its third party financed portfolio both within Britain and internationally.

== Corporate leadership ==
James Collinson was appointed Director, NCB in April 2012 having been involved in establishing the new company. In December 2013 he became managing director on the appointment of Mark Thickbroom to the new role of Finance and Commercial Director for NCB.

=== Board of directors ===
As of June 2021, the current NCB board members are:

- Neil Hannah, Chairman
- Sam Brunker, Managing Director
- Mark Thickbroom, Finance and Commercial Director
- Sally Rose, Shareholders Representative
- George Bearfield, Non-executive Director

== Projects and undertakings ==
Shortly following its creation, NCB became involved in various domestic railway projects. One was the Thameslink Programme, for which NCB has provided safety verification and Assessment Body services. Separately, as part of the Northern Hub project, specifically Phase 1 of the North West Electrification was for the Manchester to West Coast Main Line and Newton-le-Willows electrification scheme, NCB was selected as the Notified Body (NoBo), Designated Body (DeBo) and to provide safety verification. The organisation has also been overseeing the deployment of the European Rail Traffic Management System (ERTMS) at several locations in the UK, such as the East Coast Main Line. NCB has also been involved in the authorisation of automatic train operation (ATO) deployments. During March 2018, it was announced that, in partnership with Certifer SA, NCB has been awarded a ten year contract, valued at £20 million, to provide independent assessment services for High Speed 2, specifically the design and construction of Phase 1 and Phase 2a.

NCB has undertaken the assessment and approval of several different forms of rolling stock, from passenger multiple units to infrastructure maintenance vehicles. During the 2010s, to better accommodate changes to both regulations and standards pertaining to the assessment of rail vehicles, certification practices that had traditionally involved acceptance being performed by an accredited Vehicle Acceptance Body (VAB) have slowly shifted towards this role being undertaken by accredited Notified Bodies, such as NCB, instead.

NCB has also been involved in various international projects. During July 2020, it was announced that, following a competitive tender process, the partnership of NCB and Certifer SA had awarded a long-term contract to provide Notified Body services to the Rail Baltica project, ensuring all infrastructure involved has full conformity with the European Technical Specifications for Interoperability (TSI).
