= Greater Anglia Route Utilisation Strategy =

The Greater Anglia Route Utilisation Strategy is a Route Utilisation Strategy published by Network Rail in December 2007. It was the sixth RUS to be produced. The area covered includes the whole of Route 5 West Anglia (WA) and Route 7 Great Eastern (GE), which both focus for passenger purposes on London Liverpool Street, and the London Fenchurch Street services from Route 6. As with other RUSs, the Greater Anglia RUS took into account a number of responses, including the Office of Rail Regulation (ORR).

The routes and services covered by the RUS are varied in type. The key issues are peak crowding on inner suburban, outer suburban and some long-distance services, and the capacity of the routes to handle growing container freight traffic; however off-peak service gaps on main passenger routes are dealt with, and the routes also include a number of relatively lightly used services, though with some peak 'spikes'.

Like other strategies in this series, recommendations are divided into short-term (Control Period 3, CP3, the remaining 18 months to March 2009), medium-term (CP4, five years to March 2014), and long-term (CP5, thereafter). A summary of recommendations for each of the strategic routes (as described above) is also provided.

As with several other RUSs the chief solution recommended for peak crowding is to add cars to the trains, which in many cases will require platform extensions, or less commonly to provide additional services, which may require other infrastructural enhancements. The RUS also picks up from the Freight RUS the enhancements desired on the Ipswich-Peterborough freight route.

== Recommendations ==
=== Short term ===
The short-term improvements are mainly minor enhancements to improve performance, but include the extension of the bay platform at Grays to accommodate 8-car trains.

=== Medium term (2009–14) ===
Thameside route: Minor infrastructure works and additional rolling stock to allow all main line peak-service trains to be extended progressively to 12-car formation; the extension of platforms on the Tilbury loop and Ockendon branch to handle 12 cars, to allow all main line peak-service trains to be extended progressively to 8 or 12-car formation.

Great Eastern route: All services to include a stop at Stratford, requiring a platform extension, to provide improved connectivity with TfL's system, to even out the peak flows, and release additional paths on the route; three additional trains per hour (tph) in each peak 3-hour period (12-car in the high peaks, 8 in the shoulder peaks), one from Colchester, one from Chelmsford, one from Southend; extending peak hour Southminster branch trains to 12-car; minor infrastructure works and replacement rolling stock in 5-car formation to provide more seats in the peak on the main line to Norwich; construction of a turnback facility at Chadwell Heath, to extend existing and additional morning peak services, and provide a regulating facility during times of disruption; power supply to be enhanced for some of these options.

West Anglia route: The extension of remaining non-compliant platforms on the Liverpool Street-Cambridge route and at Stansted Airport to handle 12 cars; the reinstatement of 9-car trains in the peaks on the Hertford East, Enfield Town, Cheshunt via Southbury and Chingford branch services, requiring a small amount of infrastructure; a shuttle service between Cheshunt and Seven Sisters, where a power-operated turnback would be provided, and where interchange with London Underground is available, should be introduced during the peaks; stabling and maintenance facilities for the larger, enhanced fleet; removal of the three level crossings between Tottenham Hale and Waltham Cross; power supply to be enhanced for some of these options and likely future requirements.

Freight Accommodating growth in freight traffic, predominantly containers from the Haven ports, mainly via the cross-country route to the ECML at Peterborough and the WCML at Nuneaton (for which W10 clearance works are in hand), but also via the paths remaining on the Great Eastern Main Line (GEML).

Cross-country passenger services There is an aspiration to provide hourly services on various cross country routes; the case for Ipswich-Peterborough is good, providing compatible timetabling with the freight service is possible; Ipswich-Lowestoft and Cambridge-Norwich would require infrastructure works and needs to be evaluated later, especially as passenger growth trends emerge.

Greater Anglia perspective Doubling of Haughley Junction (on the Cambridge-Stowmarket route), full commissioning of Ely West Curve, and accommodating Class 6 freight trains, all to improve performance.

=== Longer term (to 2019, and beyond) ===
Thameside route Continued lengthening of (mainly shoulder) peak trains to 12-car formation.

Great Eastern route Continued lengthening of (mainly shoulder) peak trains to 12-car formation; additional stabling facilities.

West Anglia Four-tracking of the route between Coppermill Junction (south of Tottenham Hale station) and Broxbourne junction, where the Cambridge/Stansted and Hertford East lines diverge; an additional tunnel and platform edge on the Stansted Airport branch; 1 additional tph serving Stansted; up to six peak time extra tph, including four into Stratford as a terminus; after Crossrail implementation (which releases GE paths between Liverpool Street and Stratford), extending these Stratford services to Liverpool Street, and diverting some Chingford services via a reinstated Hall Farm Curve and Stratford, in turn releasing paths between Hackney Downs and Bethnal Green.

Freight Accommodating further growth in freight traffic, including higher capacity in the Leicester area in line with scheduled resignalling.

Crossrail within this timeframe the east-west London Crossrail project is scheduled to be opened; this will subsume GE inner suburban services at 10-car formation.

=== Combined effect through time by route ===
The benefit cost ratios of the recommendations over time is estimated as:

- Thameside route: 3.3
- Great Eastern route: 5.7
- West Anglia (with substantially higher investment costs): 2.7 (including wider economic benefits)

== Subsequent developments ==
Grays bay platform extension authorised to completion.

Report by Passenger Watch on car parking restrictions.

=== NR CP4 Delivery Plan 2009 ===
In March 2009, Network Rail published its CP4 Delivery Plan 2009, including Enhancements programme: statement of scope, outputs and milestones, confirming several of the recommended interventions. Specific projects, with their reference and page numbers in the document, are given below:

- 03.01 Felixstowe – Nuneaton freight capacity, p17
- 15.02 Platform extensions to 12-car capability, Tilbury Loop and Ockendon Branch, p57
- 15.03 Platform extensions to 12-car capability, West Anglia outer suburban, pp58–59 (including new Cambridge island platform)
- 16.05 Route 5 power supply enhancements, pp83–84
- 16.06 Route 6 power supply enhancements, p85
- 16.07 Route 7 power supply enhancements, pp86–87
- 17.03 Seven Sisters improved access, p92
