= Yaxham Light Railway =

Heritage railway in Norfolk, England

Coordinates: 52.65163°N 0.95968°E

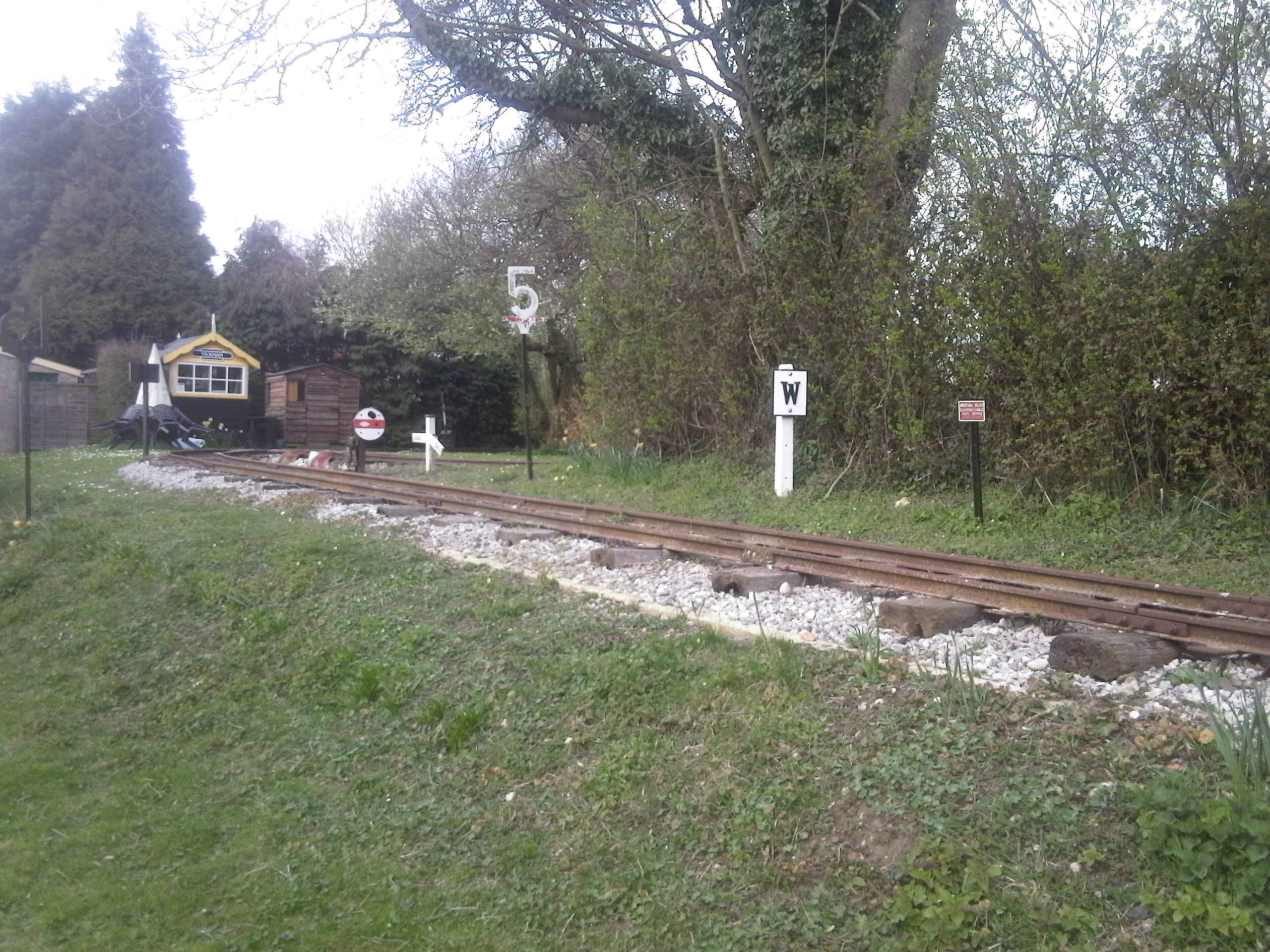
- Locale: England
- Terminus: Yaxham

Commercial operations
- Name: Yaxham Park Light Railway
- Original gauge: 2 ft (610 mm)

Preserved operations
- Operated by: Yaxham Light Railway
- Stations: 2
- Length: 360 yd (329 m)
- Preserved gauge: 2 ft (610 mm)

Commercial history
- Opened: 1967

Yaxham Light Railway is a 2 ft (610 mm) narrow gauge light railway (heritage railway) situated adjacent to Yaxham railway station on the Mid-Norfolk Railway. It is located in the village of Yaxham in the English county of Norfolk. The railway is listed as exempt from the UK Railways (Interoperability) Regulations 2000.

== History ==
Mr David Charles Potter opened the site's first narrow gauge line in the former goods yard in 1967. This was constructed for his Hunslet 0-4-0ST "Cackler", and the disused tracks of this line can still be seen from passing trains on the Mid-Norfolk Railway.

In 1969 the loco was moved across the standard gauge line to the Yaxham Park Light Railway (YPLR), which ran for over 0.5 miles (0.8 km) in meadows beyond the station, eventually being replaced by today's Yaxham Light Railway.

== Present day ==
The main running line is some 360 yd (329 m) long. It operates a collection of industrial railway equipment acquired over the years from quarries and other locations throughout the country. Passenger trains are usually hauled by a variety of vintage diesel locomotives.

== Rolling stock ==
Steam locomotives

- YLR No.1 – "Coffee Pot" – 0-4-0VB vertical boilered locomotive built at Yaxham
- YLR No. 20 – "Kidbrooke" – W. G. Bagnall Ltd 0-4-0ST built 1917 (named after its service at RAF Kidbrooke)
- Kerr Stuart Joffre class No. 3010 - Sold to at a quarry at Carriers de la Vallee Heureuse, in France in June 1930. Imported by Rich Morris and displayed at Gloddfa Ganol. Moved to the Yaxham Light Railway, now awaiting restoration at the Statfold Barn Railway

Diesel locomotives

- YLR No. 2 – "Rusty" – Lister "Rail-Truck" built 1948
- YLR No. 3 – "Pest" – Lister "Rail-Truck" built 1954
- YLR No. 4 – "Goofy" – 1936 Orenstein & Koppel with a Single Cylinder Crude Oil Engine
- YLR No. 6 – "Colonel" – Ruston & Hornsby built 1940
- YLR No. 7 – Ruston & Hornsby 16 hp class, built 1934
- YLR No. 10 – "Ousel" – Motor Rail Ltd ‘20/28hp’ plate frame type, built 1937
- YLR No. 13 – "Warboys" - Motor Rail Ltd ‘20/28hp’ plate frame type, built 1940
- YLR No. 14 – "Army 25" – Ruston & Hornsby class ‘20DL’, built 1943
- YLR No. 18 – "Planet" – F.C. Hibberd & Co Ltd type 39, built 1962
- YLR No. 19 – "Penlee" – Hudson Hunslet 25 hp, built 1942. Ex-Gloddfa Ganol
- YLR No. 44 - Moes built c.1955

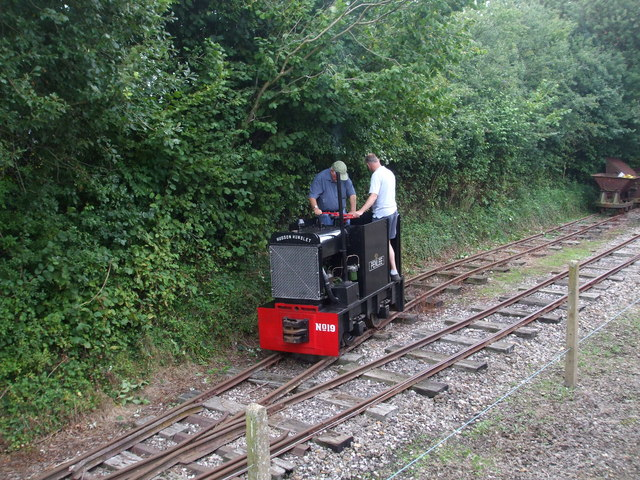
Number 19

Standard gauge goods wagons

- GWR 126977 MOGO Cars Wagon, grounded body and former narrow gauge locomotive shed.

== See also ==
- Bressingham Steam and Gardens
- Bure Valley Railway
- Mid-Norfolk Railway
- North Norfolk Railway
- Wells and Walsingham Light Railway
- Whitwell & Reepham railway station
