= Network Rail Route 7 (Great Eastern) =

Strategic Route 7 - Great Eastern was the designation given by Network Rail, from 2004 to 2009, to a grouping of railway lines in the East of England that encompassed the Great Eastern Main Line and its various branch lines. The route serviced the regional centres of Colchester, Ipswich and Norwich as well as the ports of Felixstowe and Harwich.

In 2010, Network Rail restructured its route categorisation. Routes 5 and 7 were merged into Strategic Route D: East Anglia.

== Strategic route sections ==
The Route was divided into a number of separate Strategic Route Sections (SRS's) that were defined based on route use, infrastructure and historical lines.

Route	Strategic Route Sections (SRS)	Corresponding historical lines (whole & partial)
Route 7 – Great Eastern	07.01 - Liverpool Street – Shenfield	Great Eastern Main Line
Route 7 – Great Eastern	07.02 - Shenfield–Ipswich	Great Eastern Main Line
Route 7 – Great Eastern	07.03 - Ipswich–Norwich	Great Eastern Main Line
Route 7 – Great Eastern	07.04 - Freight lines	freight-only lines within area covered
Route 7 – Great Eastern	07.05 - Shenfield–Southend Victoria/Southminster	Crouch Valley line, Shenfield–Southend line
Route 7 – Great Eastern	07.06 - Braintree branch	Braintree branch line
Route 7 – Great Eastern	07.07 - Harwich branch	Mayflower line
Route 7 – Great Eastern	07.08 - Walton and Clacton Branches	Sunshine Coast Line
Route 7 – Great Eastern	07.09 - Romford–Upminster	Romford–Upminster line
Route 7 – Great Eastern	07.10 - Sudbury to Marks Tey	Gainsborough line
Route 7 – Great Eastern	07.11 - East Suffolk line and Norfolk branches	Bittern Line, East Suffolk line, Wherry Lines
Route 7 – Great Eastern	07.12 - Felixstowe–Ipswich Yard	Felixstowe branch line

== Railway planning ==
As part of Network Rail's Strategic Business Plan a Route Plan for each route, including Route 7, was published annually. The Route 7 plans for 2008 and 2009 are made available online.

Together with Route 5 – West Anglia and Route 6 – North London Line and Thameside the route was included in the Greater Anglia Route Utilisation Strategy.

== Proposed developments ==
The Greater Anglia RUS includes a number of proposals for the future development of the route. In the medium term, 2009–14, this includes minor infrastructure works and additional rolling stock to allow main line peak-service trains to be extended to 12-car formation. Also included is the proposal for the extension of platforms at Stratford to handle 12 cars, to allow all main line peak-service trains to be extended to 8 or 12-car formation. In the longer term intentions are to continue the lengthening of peak trains to 12-car formation. Enhancements to the power supply of the route are intended for completion by 2012 to interface with those carried out on Route 5 and Route 6.

== See also ==
- Network Rail Route 23 (North West Rural)
- Network Rail Route 5 (West Anglia)
- Network Rail Route 6 (North London Line and Thameside)
