= Network Rail Route 5 (West Anglia) =

Strategic Route 5 - West Anglia was the designation given by Network Rail, from 2004 to 2009, to a grouping of railway lines in the East of England that encompassed the West Anglia Main Line and its various branch lines. The route provided key services to Cambridge and Stansted Airport as well as supporting suburban services in North London and rural services in Cambridgeshire, Norfolk and Suffolk.

In 2010, Network Rail restructured its route categorisation. Routes 5 and 7 were merged into Strategic Route D: East Anglia.

== Strategic route sections ==
The Route was divided into a number of separate Strategic Route Sections (SRS's) that were defined based on route use, infrastructure and historical lines.

Route	Strategic Route Sections (SRS)	Corresponding historical lines (whole & partial)
Route 5 - West Anglia	05.01 - Bethnal Green – Stansted Airport	Lea Valley Lines, West Anglia Main Line
Route 5 - West Anglia	05.02 - Hackney Downs – Cheshunt	Lea Valley Lines
Route 5 - West Anglia	05.03 - Hertford East Branch	Hertford East Branch Line
Route 5 - West Anglia	05.04 - Chingford Branch	Lea Valley Lines
Route 5 - West Anglia	05.05 - Cambridge Lines	Cambridge Line, West Anglia Main Line
Route 5 - West Anglia	05.06 - Ely – King's Lynn	Fen Line
Route 5 - West Anglia	05.07 - Peterborough – Ely – Haughley Jn	Ely to Peterborough Line, Ipswich to Ely Line
Route 5 - West Anglia	05.08 - Coldham Lane Jn – Chippenham Jn	Ipswich to Ely Line
Route 5 - West Anglia	05.09 - Ely – Norwich	Breckland Line
Route 5 - West Anglia	05.10 - Freight Lines	freight only lines within area covered

== Railway planning ==
As part of Network Rail's Strategic Business Plan a Route Plan for each route, including Route 5, was published annually. The Route 5 plans for 2008 and 2009 are made available online.

Together with Route 7 - Great Eastern and Route 6 - North London Line and Thameside, the route was included in the Greater Anglia Route Utilisation Strategy.

== Proposed developments ==
The Greater Anglia RUS includes a number of proposals for the future development of the route. In the medium term, 2009–14, this includes minor infrastructure works and additional rolling stock to allow main line peak-service trains to be extended to 12-car formation. A number of developments are also intended for the West Coast Main Line depending on the status of future development at Stansted Airport. Enhancements to the power supply of the route are intended for completion by 2012 to interface with those carried out on Route 6 and Route 7.
