= Network Rail Route 6 (North London Line and Thameside) =

Strategic Route 6 - North London Line and Thameside was the designation Network Rail gave to a grouping of railway lines in Greater London and the East of England region that encompassed the London, Tilbury and Southend Line and overground commuter lines within London. The route provided key services to Southend and London suburban areas as well as supporting various freight routes within London.

In 2010, Network Rail restructured its route categorisation. Route 6 was split into Strategic Route E: North London Line, and Strategic Route F: Thameside.

== Strategic route sections ==
The Route was divided into a number of separate Strategic Route Sections (SRS's) that were defined based on route use, infrastructure and historical lines.

| Route | Strategic Route Sections (SRS) | Corresponding historical lines (whole & partial) |
|---|---|---|
| Route 6 - North London Line and Thameside | 06.01 - NLL: Gospel Oak – Stratford | North London line |
| Route 6 - North London Line and Thameside | 06.02 - Fenchurch Street – Shoeburyness | London, Tilbury and Southend Line (including the Bow Curve) |
| Route 6 - North London Line and Thameside | 06.03 - Forest Gate Jn – Barking | Gospel Oak to Barking line |
| Route 6 - North London Line and Thameside | 06.04 - Barking – Pitsea | London, Tilbury and Southend Line |
| Route 6 - North London Line and Thameside | 06.05 - Gospel Oak – Woodgrange Park | Gospel Oak to Barking Line |
| Route 6 - North London Line and Thameside | 06.06 - NLL: Willesden Jn– Gospel Oak | North London Line |
| Route 6 - North London Line and Thameside | 06.07 - NLL: Richmond/Old Kew Jn – Willesden Jn | North London Line |
| Route 6 - North London Line and Thameside | 06.08 - Other Freight Lines | Various freight lines |
| Route 6 - North London Line and Thameside | 06.09 - NLL: No1 Lines | Freight line |
| Route 6 - North London Line and Thameside | 06.10 - Dudding Hill Line | Freight line |

== Railway planning ==
As part of its Strategic Business Plan, Network Rail annually published a Route Plan for each route, including Route 6; the 2008 and 2009 Route 6 plans are available online.

Together with Route 7 - Great Eastern and Route 5 - West Anglia, the London, Tilbury and Southend Line section of the route was included in the Greater Anglia Route Utilisation Strategy. The North London Lines section of the route was included in the Cross London Route Utilisation Strategy.

== Proposed developments ==
The Greater Anglia RUS includes a number of proposal for the future development of the route. In the medium term, 2009–14, this plan includes minor infrastructure works and additional rolling stock to allow all main line peak-service trains to be extended to 12-car formation. Also included is the proposal for the extension of platforms on the Tilbury loop and Ockendon branch to handle 12 cars, to allow all main line peak-service trains to be extended to 8 or 12-car formation. In the longer term intentions are to continue the lengthening of peak trains to 12-car formation. Enhancements to the power supply of the route are intended for completion by 2012 to interface with those carried out on Route 5 and Route 7.
