= Network Rail =

Rail company in the United Kingdom

Network Rail Limited
- Type: Government-owned company/non-departmental public body (Note: Incorporated as a private company limited by guarantee without share capital)
- Industry: Rail infrastructure and asset management
- Predecessor: Railtrack
- Founded: 3 October 2002; 24 years ago
- Headquarters: Waterloo General Office, London
- Area served: Great Britain
- Key people: Richard George (Chair); Jeremy Westlake (CEO)
- Products: Public transport
- Revenue: £11.5 billion (2024)
- Total assets: £90.1 billion (2024)
- Total equity: £18.4 billion (2024)
- Owner: HM Government (Department for Transport)
- Number of employees: 40,966 (2024)
- Website: www.networkrail.co.uk

Network Rail Limited is the owner and infrastructure manager of most of the railway network in Great Britain. Network Rail is a non-departmental public body of the Department for Transport with no shareholders, which reinvests its income in the railways.

Network Rail's main customers are the train operating companies (TOCs), responsible for passenger transport, and freight operating companies (FOCs), who provide train services on the infrastructure that Network Rail owns and maintains. Since 1 September 2014, Network Rail has been classified as a "public sector body". (Note: Classification applied retroactively from 1 April 2004.)

To cope with rapidly increasing passenger numbers, as of 2021 Network Rail has been undertaking a £38 billion programme of upgrades to the network, including Crossrail, electrification of lines and upgrading Thameslink.

In May 2021, the UK government announced its intent to merge Network Rail's responsibilities with other railway operations into a new public body called Great British Railways.

== History ==
=== Background ===
Britain's railway system was built by private companies, but it was nationalised by the Transport Act 1947 and run by British Railways until re-privatisation which was begun in 1994 and completed in 1997. As a part of the privatisation process, the railway infrastructure, passenger and freight services were separated into separate organisations. Between 1994 and 2002, the infrastructure was owned and operated by Railtrack, a privately owned company.

A spate of accidents, including the Southall rail crash in 1997 and the Ladbroke Grove rail crash in 1999 called into question the negative consequences that the fragmentation of the railway network had introduced to both safety and maintenance procedures. Railtrack was severely criticised for both its performance for infrastructure improvement and for its safety record. The Hatfield train crash on 17 October 2000 was a defining moment in the collapse of Railtrack. The immediate major repairs undertaken across the whole British railway network were estimated to have cost in the order of £580 million and Railtrack had no idea how many more 'Hatfields' were waiting to happen because it had lost considerable in-house engineering skill following the sale or closure of many of the engineering and maintenance functions of British Rail to external companies; nor did the company have any way of assessing the consequence of the speed restrictions it was ordering. These restrictions brought the railway network to an almost total standstill and drew significant public ire. According to railway historian Christian Wolmar, Railtrack's board panicked in the wake of Hatfield. Railtrack's first chief executive, John Edmonds, had pursued a deliberate strategy of outsourcing engineers' work wherever possible with the goal of reducing costs.

Various major schemes being undertaken by Railtrack had also gone awry. The modernisation of the West Coast Main Line had suffered from spiralling costs, rising from an estimated £2 billion to roughly £10 billion. This programme suffered failures that were technical as well as managerial, such as the moving block signalling apparatus being immature for such a busy mixed-traffic mainline. In 2000, reports emerged that Railtrack may not be able to go through with its planned commitment to purchase section 2 of High Speed 1, resulting in disruption and uncertainty for that programme as well.

In February 2001, Steve Marshall, Railtrack's chairman, warned that Railtrack could have a net debt of approximately £8 billion by 2003. During May 2001, Railtrack announced that, despite making a pre-tax profit before exceptional expenses of £199m, the £733m of costs and compensation paid out over the Hatfield crash had plunged Railtrack from profit into a loss of £534m, and it approached the government for funding, which it controversially used to pay a £137m dividend to its shareholders in May 2001. Months later, Railtrack sought another bailout from the government. On 7 October 2001, Railtrack plc was placed into railway administration under the Railways Act 1993, following an application to the High Court by the then Transport Secretary, Stephen Byers.

=== Initial activities ===
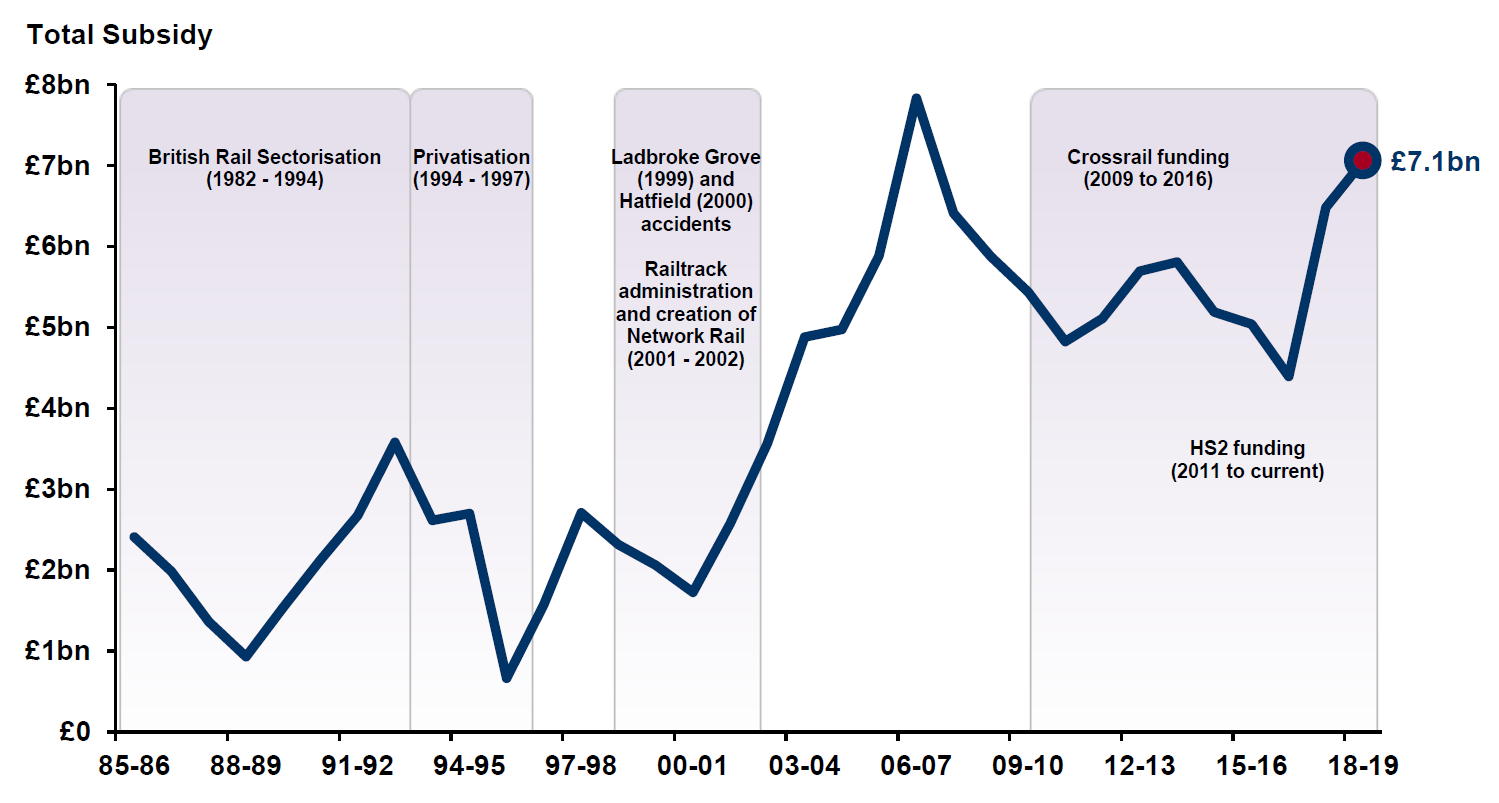
GB total rail subsidy 1985–2019 (in 2018-19 prices), showing a short decline in subsidy after privatisation, followed by a steep rise following the Hatfield crash in 2000 then a further increase to fund Crossrail and HS2 development.

Network Rail Ltd. was created with the express purpose of taking over Britain's railway infrastructure control; this was achieved via its purchase of Railtrack plc from Railtrack Group plc for £500 million; Railtrack plc was then renamed and reconstituted as Network Rail Infrastructure Limited. The transaction was completed on 3 October 2002. The former company had thus never ceased to exist but continued under another name: for this reason Network Rail Infrastructure Ltd was the defendant in later prosecutions in respect of events which had occurred in the days of Railtrack.

Network Rail owns the infrastructure, including the railway tracks, signals, overhead wires, tunnels, bridges, level crossings and most stations, but not the passenger or commercial freight rolling stock, other than its limited departmental stock. While it owns over 2,500 railway stations, it manages only 20 of the biggest and busiest of them as all the other stations are managed by the various train operating companies (TOCs). Network Rail should not be confused with National Rail, the latter is a brand rather than an organisation, used to inform and promote a nationwide network of passenger railway services. The majority of Network Rail lines also carry freight traffic; some lines are freight only. A few lines that carry passenger traffic are not part of the National Rail network (such as the Tyne and Wear Metro and the London Underground). Conversely, a few National Rail services operate over track which is not part of the Network Rail network, such as the line between Harrow-on-the-Hill and Amersham being owned by London Underground.

From 2003 onwards and as of 2026, Network Rail has used what it called a New Measurement Train to record the state of the railway lines.

Following an initial period in which Network Rail established itself and demonstrated its competence in addressing the principal challenges of improving asset condition, reducing unit costs and tackling delay, the Government's Rail Review in 2004 said that Network Rail should be given responsibility for whole-industry performance reporting, timetable development, specification of small and medium network enhancements, and the delivery of route-specific utilisation strategies (RUS). Some of these are functions which Network Rail already had; others – such as the obligation to devise route utilisation strategies – were transferred to Network Rail from the Strategic Rail Authority, a non-departmental public body, part of the UK government. The SRA was abolished in November 2006.

Network Rail initially sub-contracted much of the infrastructure work to private maintenance companies, such as Carillion and First Engineering; other sub-contractors perform specialist work or additional labour, such as Prima Services Group, Sky Blue, Balfour Beatty, Laboursite, BCL, Atkins (Atkins Rail) and McGinleys. In October 2003, Network Rail announced that it would take over all infrastructure maintenance work from private contractors, following concerns about the quality of work carried out by certain private firms and spiralling costs. In 2007, it was announced that the number of track renewal contractors would be reduced from six to four; Amey/SECO, Balfour Beatty, Babcock First Engineering and Jarvis plc. Network Rail has expanded its in-house engineering skills, including funding of apprenticeship and foundation degree schemes, and has reported significant savings from transferring work away from contracting companies. Additional work was taken back in-house after the serious accident at Potters Bar and other accidents at Rotherham and King's Cross led to Jarvis's collapse into administration in March 2010.

The company moved its headquarters to Kings Place, 90 York Way, from 40 Melton Street, Euston, in August 2008. Two months later, Sir Ian McAllister announced that he would not stand for re-election as chairman of Network Rail after holding the position for six years. He noted that as Network Rail moved to a "new phase in its development" it was appropriate for a new chairman to lead it there. Network Rail also has a 15-year lease on Square One in Manchester with 800 staff in one of Manchester's largest refurbished office spaces. During June 2012, work was completed on the company's new national centre, known as the Quadrant:MK. Based in Milton Keynes about five minutes' walk from Milton Keynes Central, it comprises four buildings connected to a central street, accommodating more than 3,000 people. Various divisions, including engineering, logistics, operations (including timetable planning), IT, procurement, planning and finance departments, and Route Services Supply Chain operations have been transferred to the Quadrant.

=== Allegations and controversies ===
In 2009, allegations appeared in the media from the Transport Salaried Staffs' Association concerning treatment of Network Rail employees. Former chief executive Iain Coucher was also accused of financial impropriety involving unspecified payments to his business partner Victoria Pender during his tenure at Network Rail. An internal investigation held by Network Rail in 2010, vetted by its auditors PricewaterhouseCoopers, uncovered no evidence of wrongdoing. An independent enquiry headed by Anthony White QC in 2011 further examined the claims, but also exonerated Coucher.

Critical commentary appeared in the media concerning the knighthood awarded to John Armitt in the 2012 New Year Honours for services to engineering and construction. Armitt was Chief Executive of Network Rail at the time of the 2007 Grayrigg derailment and the family of a victim of the accident criticised the award, which coincidentally was conferred on the same day that Network Rail were prosecuted for the accident.

In 2023, one of Network Rail's managing directors resigned after a litany of problems in the areas she was responsible for. Michelle Handforth resigned after infrastructure problems left hundreds of passengers stranded in carriages in London, one of the latest issues with the lines outside Paddington Station. The Office of Rail and Road was already investigating poor reliability and punctuality in the Wales and Western region.

=== Regional reorganisation and shared responsibilities ===
During February 2011, it was announced that Network Rail had begun the process of reorganising its operational structure into nine semi-autonomous regional entities, each with their own managing director; the first two units to be created were Scotland and Wessex regions. The reorganisation has been interpreted as a move back towards vertical integration of track and train operations.

In December 2016, the Transport Secretary, Chris Grayling announced that Network Rail would lose sole control of track maintenance and repairs, and instead would share this with the Train Operating Companies.

=== Electrification schemes ===
During March 2011, the British government announced that the Great Western Main Line would be electrified as far as Bristol Temple Meads. Within four years, this programme, which was headed by Network Rail, was beset by poor planning and cost overruns, leading to the shortcomings being scrutinised by Parliament. Specifically, the projected cost had increased from £1.2 billion to £2.8 billion by the end of 2015, while the project's timetable was also delayed to the extent that the government had to request Hitachi to retrofit the new high speed trainsets procured under the Intercity Express Programme with diesel engines as well as electric traction. In July 2017, the government announced that, in response to the programme's continued difficulties, the scope of the electrification scheme had been decreased; specifically, it would only be completed as far as Thingley Junction, two miles (3.2 km) west of Chippenham, while the electrification of other lines, including Bristol Parkway to Temple Meads and Didcot to Oxford, was also postponed.

During 2011, work commenced to extend the electrification of the Midland Main Line, including to both Corby and Nottingham. In July 2017, it was announced the then-Secretary of State for Transport Chris Grayling that the electrification scheme north of Kettering to Derby, Nottingham and Sheffield had been cancelled and that bi-mode trains would be used instead. However, in May 2022, a briefing to contractors was released ahead of an invitation to tender for Midland Mainline Electrification project work to extend electrification to Nottingham and Sheffield. This scheme is expected to cost £1.3 billion.

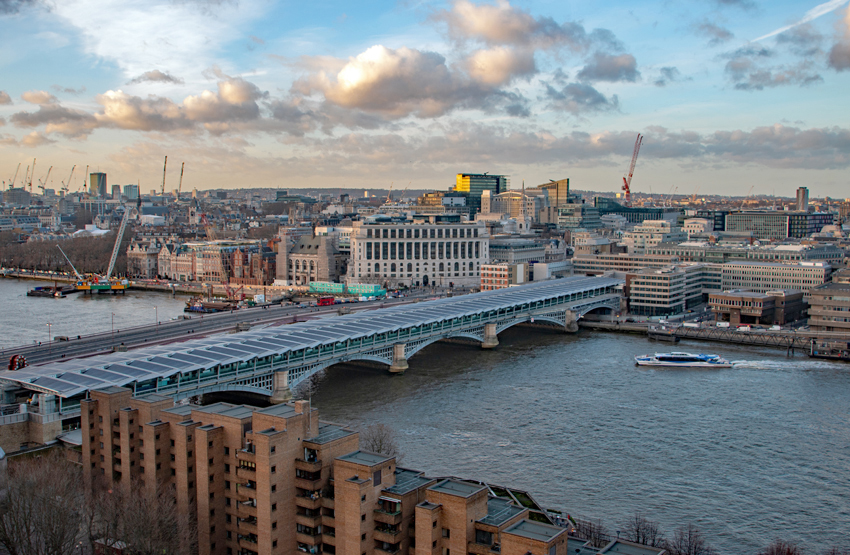
Blackfriars Railway Bridge with photo-voltaic roof panels

Network Rail has undertaken numerous schemes to develop its own renewable electrical generation footprint, which is used in part to power the operational railway. In January 2014, Network Rail opened the world's largest solar-powered bridge, adjacent to the remains of the old Blackfriars Railway Bridge, across the River Thames. The roof of the new railway bridge is covered with 4,400 photovoltaic panels, providing up to half of the energy requirement for London Blackfriars station. Solar panels are used at various locations across Network Rail's property portfolio, including stations and depots. In August 2022, an agreement between the company and EDF was signed to provide more solar energy.

=== Planned succession and restructuring ===
In May 2021, the Conservative UK government announced that Network Rail would be superseded by a new body, Great British Railways (GBR), in 2023. After some delay, the new body was established in shadow form by the successor Labour government in November 2024. As part of a public consultation held in early 2025 on the details of the formal creation of GBR, the government stated that Network Rail Infrastructure Limited would form the core of the new organisation.

In July 2025, it was announced that Network Rail's property team would be merged with London and Continental Railways (LCR) to create Platform4, a new state-owned railway property development company. Platform4 was subsequently launched in November 2025.

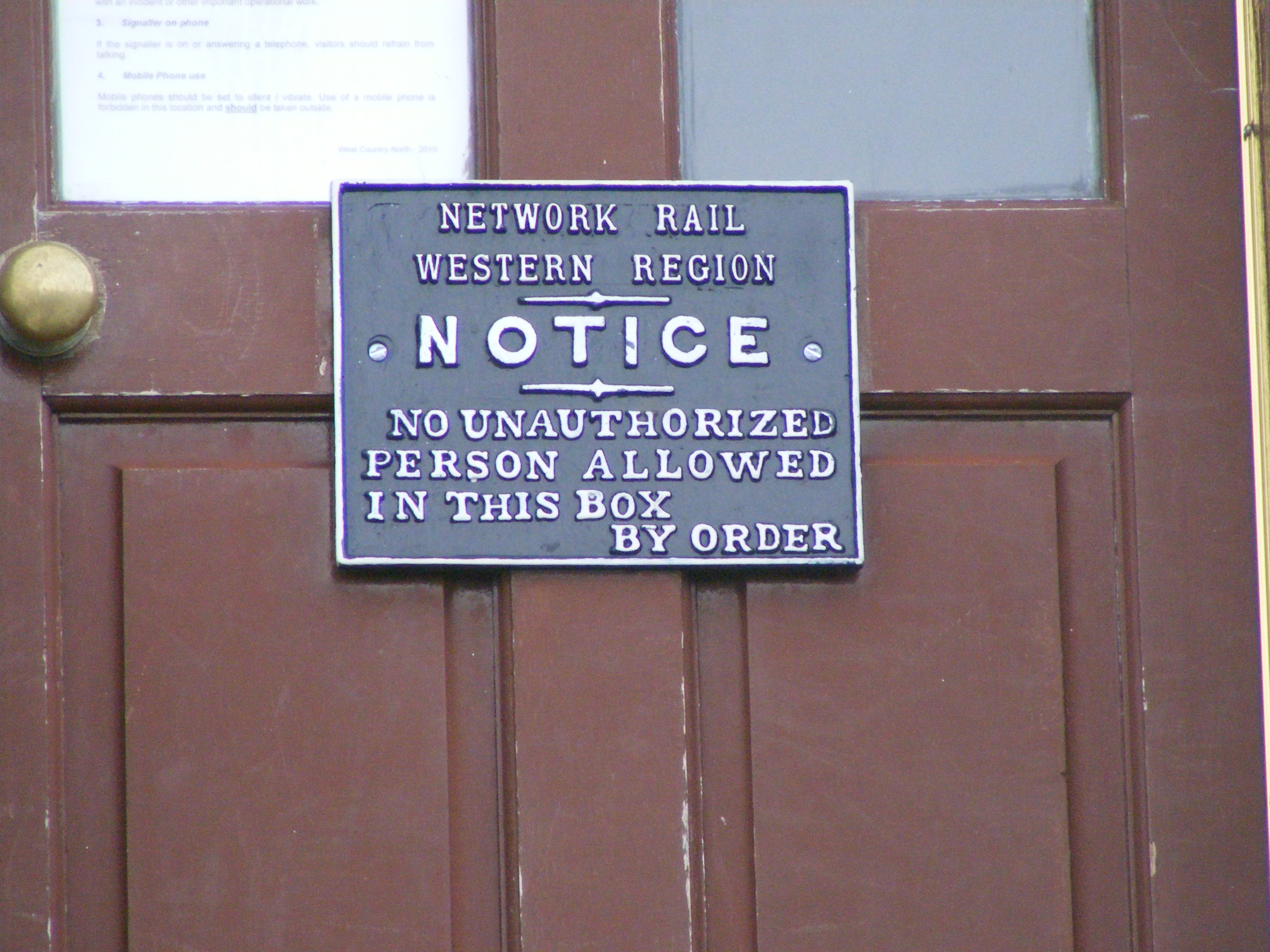
Sign showing the Network Rail name on the signal box at Ledbury

== Funding ==
Network Rail is a not-for-profit organisation. The majority of funding comes from a mix of direct grants and borrowing from the UK and Scottish Governments, payments from train and freight operators and previously a small amount of income from commercial property estate. In February 2019 Network Rail sold its commercial property business consisting of 5,200 properties, mainly railway arches, to a consortium of Telereal Trillium and Blackstone Property Partners for £1.46bn.

Network Rail works in five-year funding cycles called "Control Periods" (CP for short). The government specifies what is needed from Network Rail and sets out how much the government can afford to contribute. The Office of Rail and Road (ORR) then sets the level of fixed income that Network Rail is allowed to charge and assesses the amount of money needed by Network Rail to run efficiently. The last Control Period ran from 2014 to 2019; 1 April 2019 was the start of Control Period 6.

In 2019, government funding for train operating companies amounted to £4.1 billion, paying access charges to use the rail network, £2.1 billion and freight £58 million. In 2019, it spent £3.1 billion on renewals (restoring existing infrastructure back to how it was when new) and £3.2 billion on enhancements, with the rest spent on maintenance and other costs.

== Assets ==
=== Infrastructure ===
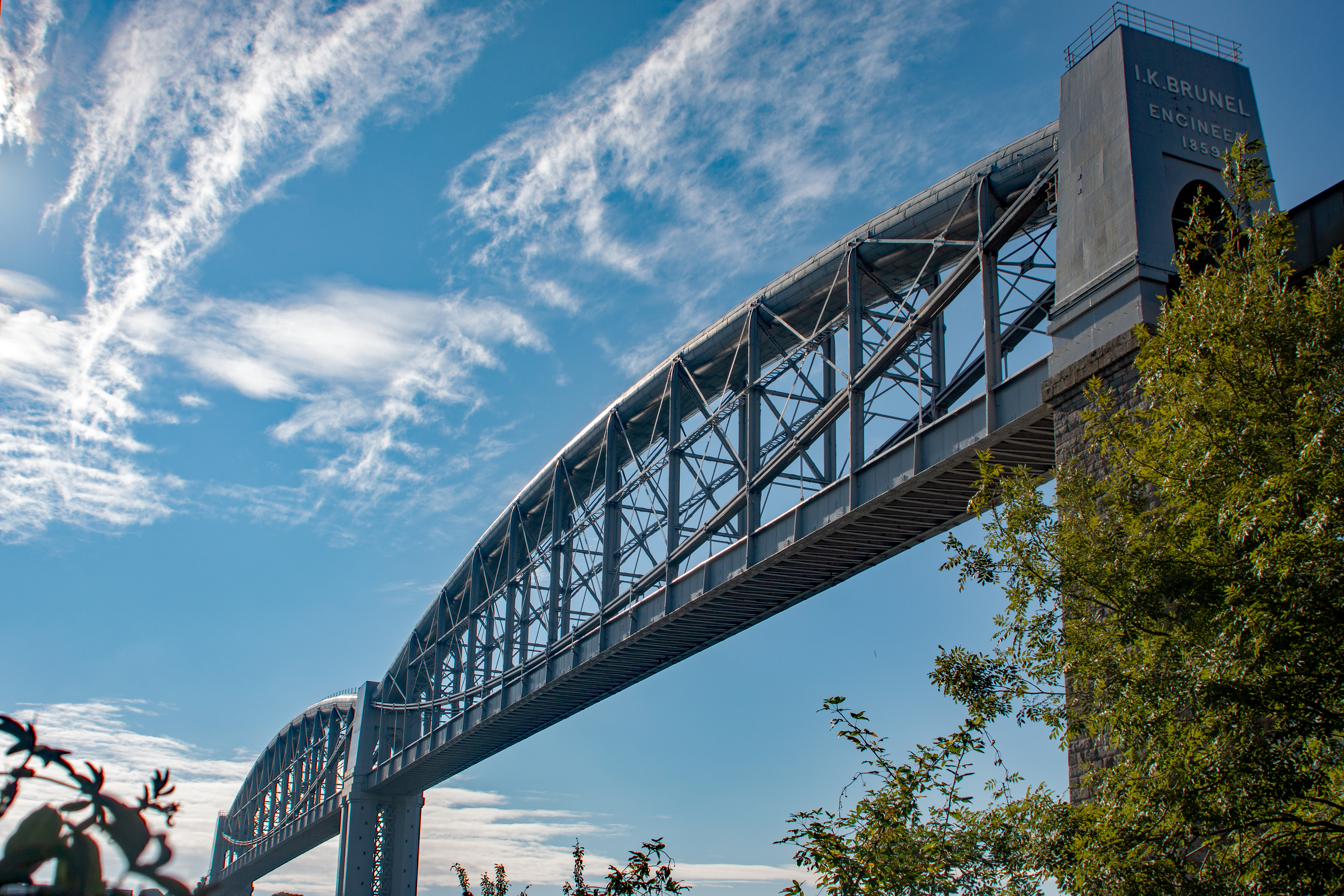
Royal Albert Bridge after refurbishment by Network Rail

Network Rail covers 20,000 miles (32,000 km) of track, and 30,000 bridges, tunnels and viaducts. They claim to run the world's largest third rail network.

In February 2004, an operations centre at Waterloo station in London was opened, which was operated jointly by Network Rail and South West Trains. This was the first full collaboration of its kind since privatisation, and it is regarded as a model for other areas of the network, with a further six integrated Network Rail + TOC Control Centres having opened since then, at Blackfriars, Croydon (Leading Control for Thameslink), Swindon, Birmingham New Street, Glasgow and, most recently, Liverpool Street and South Wales based in Cardiff Canton.

Track renewal, the ongoing modernisation of the railway network by replacing track and signalling, continues to be carried out by private engineering firms under contract. The biggest renewals projects include the multibillion-pound upgrade of the London – Glasgow West Coast Main Line, which was completed in 2008, the Thameslink Programme to upgrade the north–south railway through London and work on the part of Crossrail which is operated by Network Rail. A line closure for engineering or renewal works is known as a possession. Sustainability is addressed, for example, through the use of composite recycled materials in sleepers under rail track in place of wooden sleepers.

Network Rail has an internal infrastructure database known as GEOGIS. The system uses codes for four-digit Track IDs to identify which line at any location is referred to. The first number refers to track direction, with values of 1 (Up), 2 (Down), 3 (Reversible/Bi-directional), or 4 (Merry Go Round Loop). The second number refers to track use, which can be 1 (Main or Fast), 2 (Slow, Local or Relief), 3 (Goods), 4 (Single line), 5 (Loop), 6 (Terminal or Bay), 7 (Crossover), 8 (Other or Engine), or 9 (Single Siding). The third and fourth numbers refer to the track number, which can be any number from 00 to 99 inclusive, and are usually numbered sequentially.

In 2006, Network Rail made public a high-tech plan to combat the effects of slippery rail. This plan involves the use of satellites for tracking trouble areas, water-jetting trains and crews using railhead scrubbers, sand sticks and a substance called Natrusolve, which dissolves leaf mulch.

=== Stations ===
Network Rail owns more than 2,500 railway stations, divided into six categories. Management and operation of most of them is carried out mostly by the principal train operating company serving that station; however, in a few cases the train operating company does not serve the station. For example, Hinckley is served by CrossCountry, but it is managed by East Midlands Railway. As of April 2018, Network Rail manages 20 stations directly, with Clapham Junction and Guildford becoming managed stations on 1 April 2018. The stations which Network Rail operates are:

National

- Birmingham New Street
- Bristol Temple Meads
- Edinburgh Waverley
- Glasgow Central
- Guildford
- Leeds
- Liverpool Lime Street
- Manchester Piccadilly
- Reading

London stations

- London Bridge
- London Cannon Street
- London Charing Cross
- Clapham Junction
- London Euston
- London King's Cross
- London Liverpool Street
- London Paddington
- London St Pancras International
- London Victoria
- London Waterloo

Glasgow Central and Liverpool Lime Street stations are divided into high and low-level stations – the high-level stations are all termini used primarily by the main inter-city services to those stations. The low-level stations are through routes on local commuter networks that are largely separate from other routes to the main station; these platforms are not managed by Network Rail, but instead by the rail operator that primarily uses them, ScotRail and Merseyrail respectively.

Network Rail operated Gatwick Airport station until January 2012 when it was transferred to Southern, and Fenchurch Street until November 2014 when it was transferred to c2c. Network Rail took over management of Bristol Temple Meads and Reading in April 2014.

A DfT franchise report in 2014 stated Network Rail's intention to subsume more major stations into Network Rail's directly operated portfolio. The report earmarked York for Network Rail management, as well as Manchester Oxford Road and Manchester Victoria which are currently undergoing major rebuilding as part of the Northern Hub. However as of September 2017 the two Manchester stations remained under the operatorship of Arriva Rail North.

There are a small number of stations on the National Rail network that are not owned by Network Rail. As of 2022 these are:

Station name	Owner
Ardrossan Harbour	Peel Ports
Aylesbury Vale Parkway	Aylesbury Vale Parkway Ltd
Bromsgrove	West Midlands Combined Authority
Coleshill Parkway	Coleshill Parkway Ltd
Dunrobin Castle	Earl of Sutherland
Ebbsfleet International	HS1 Ltd
Fishguard Harbour	Stena Line
Horwich Parkway	Transport for Greater Manchester
Prestwick International Airport	Glasgow Prestwick Airport
Southend Airport	London Southend Airport
Stranraer	Stena Line
Stratford International	HS1 Ltd
Warwick Parkway	Warwickshire County Council

=== Training facilities ===
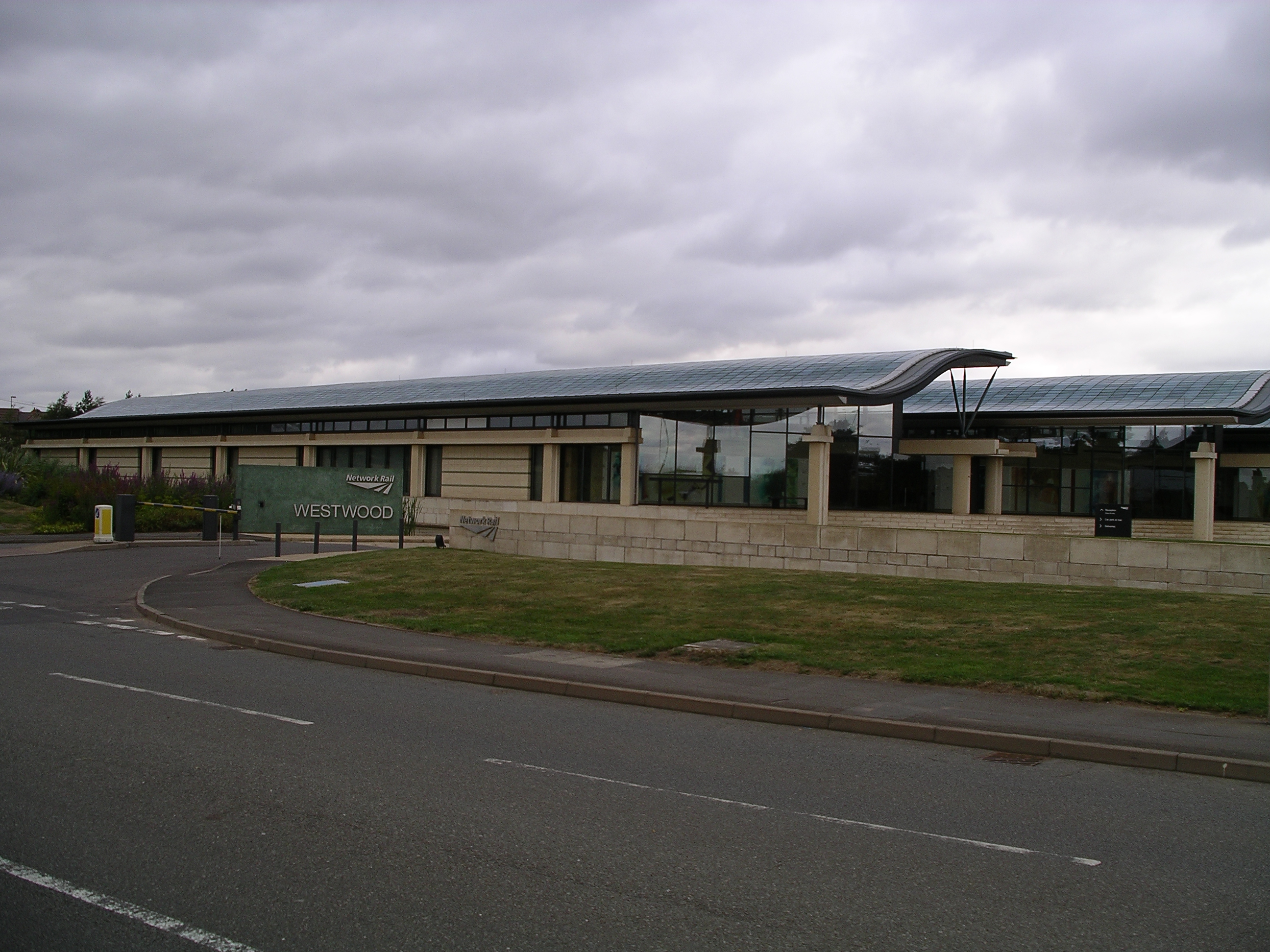
Network Rail's Coventry leadership development centre, Westwood.

Network Rail has several training and development sites around Britain. These include sites in York, Peterborough, Derby, Leeds, Walsall and Larbert which provide refresher courses, and train staff in new equipment. Advanced Apprentice Scheme trainees are trained at Network Rail's Westwood training centre for the first five months of their apprenticeship and then are trained further at HMS Sultan in Gosport over seven 2-week periods or five 3-week periods (throughout their second and third year) of their apprenticeship, using a combination of Royal Navy facilities and a specially installed training centre. All courses are taught by VT Flagship (part of Babcock International) in the first year but apprentices are trained by Network Rail staff in the second and third years. Network Rail bought a residential centre from Cable and Wireless in the Westwood Business Centre near Coventry for leadership development. The company and other industry partners such as VolkerRail and Balfour Beatty also operate a Foundation Degree in conjunction with Sheffield Hallam University.

In 2008, Network Rail piloted its first qualification in "track engineering". It has been given permission to develop courses equivalent to GCSE and A-levels.

=== Telecoms assets ===
Network Rail operates various essential telecommunication circuits for signalling and electrification control systems, train radio systems, lineside communications, level crossing CCTV, station information and security systems as well as more general IT and business telephony needs. The fixed bearer network infrastructure comprises transmission systems and telephone exchanges linked by a fibre optic and copper cable network that is located mainly within trackside troughing routes on the former British Rail Telecommunications network. (It is the largest private telecoms network in the UK).

Network Rail operates several analogue radio networks that support mobile communication applications for drivers and lineside workers which consist of base stations, antenna systems and control equipment. The National Radio Network (NRN) was developed specifically for the operational railway; it provides radio coverage for 98% of the rail network through 500 base stations and 21 radio exchanges. The Radio Electronic Token Block RETB system is based on similar technology as the NRN and ORN but provides data communication for signalling token exchange as well as voice communication.

Fixed communication at trackside is provided by telephone. These are primarily provided for signallers to communicate with train crew, via telephones mounted on signal posts, and with the public through telephones located at level crossings. GAI-Tronics provides many of the telephones sited on trackside and at level crossings. They also provide Public Access Help Points on platforms and stations to provide passengers with easy access to Information and Emergency control centres.

GSM-R radio systems are being introduced across Europe under EU legislation for interoperability. In the UK, as of March 2014, Network Rail is well underway in the UK implementation of GSM-R to replace its legacy National Radio Network (NRN) and Cab Secure Radio (CSR) systems currently in use.

=== Rolling stock ===
Network Rail operates a large variety of DMUs, locomotives and rolling stock to perform safety checks and maintenance (this fleet is not to be confused with the combined rolling stock assets of Rail Delivery Group members who work in combination as National Rail). As well as the multiple units and locomotives, Network Rail own and operate a large stock of rolling stock for particular testing duties and track maintenance. Network Rail also hire freight locomotives from various freight operators including DB Cargo UK, Freightliner, Colas Rail and GB Railfreight amongst others to operate engineers' trains in support of maintenance and renewal work. Network Rail's Infrastructure Monitoring fleet of test trains is operated by Colas Rail, primarily using locomotives from Colas' and Network Rail's own fleets, but have also used locomotives hired from other companies such as Direct Rail Services, GB Railfreight and Europhoenix as required.

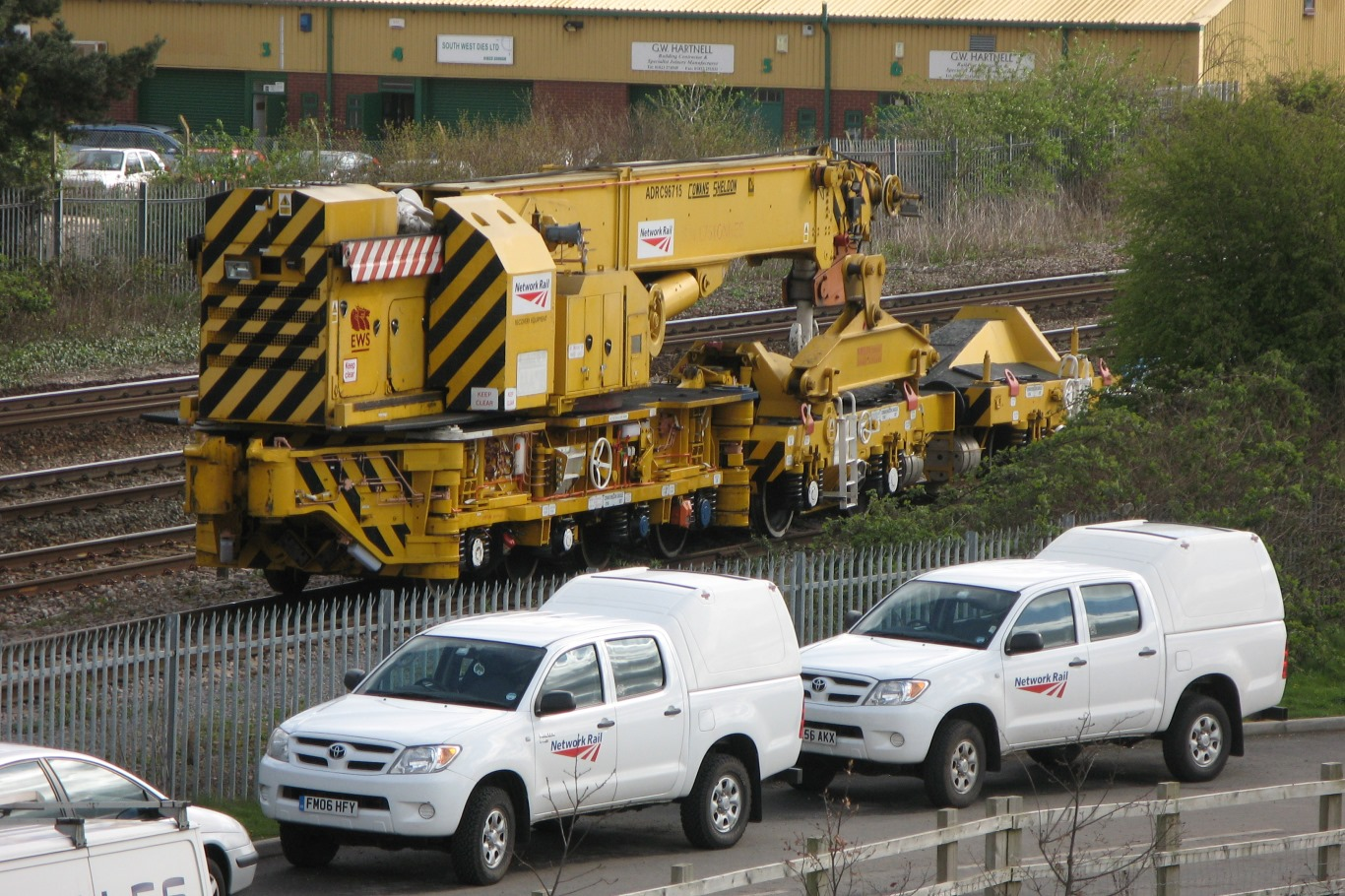
Breakdown crane

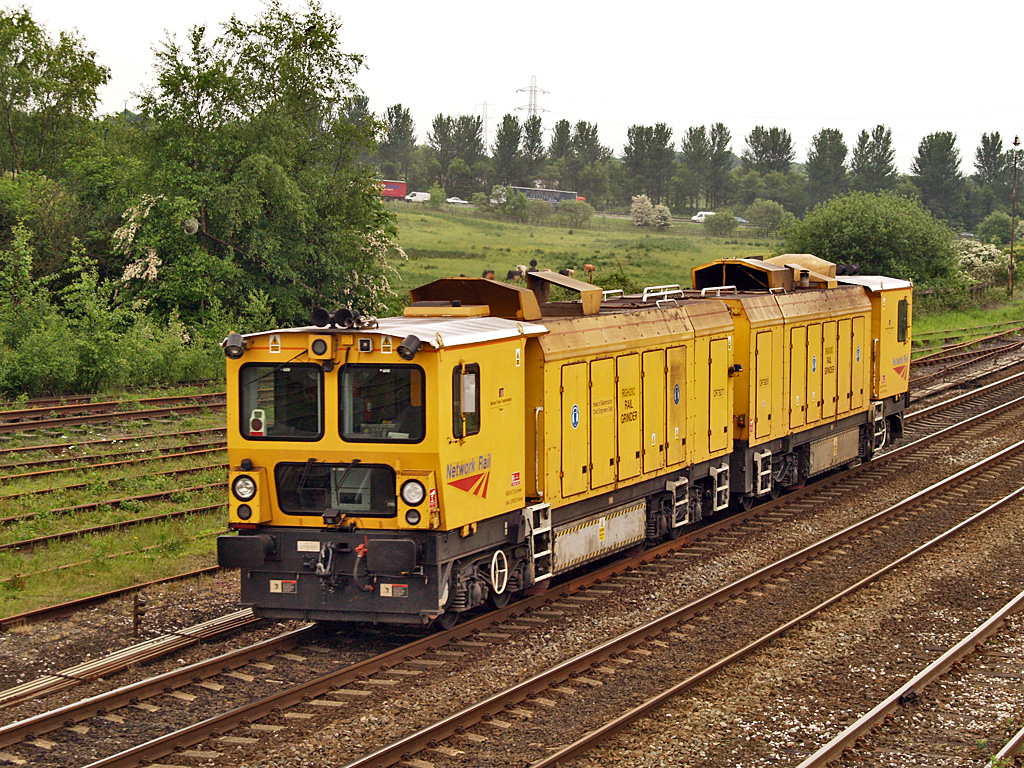
Railgrinder for switches and crossings

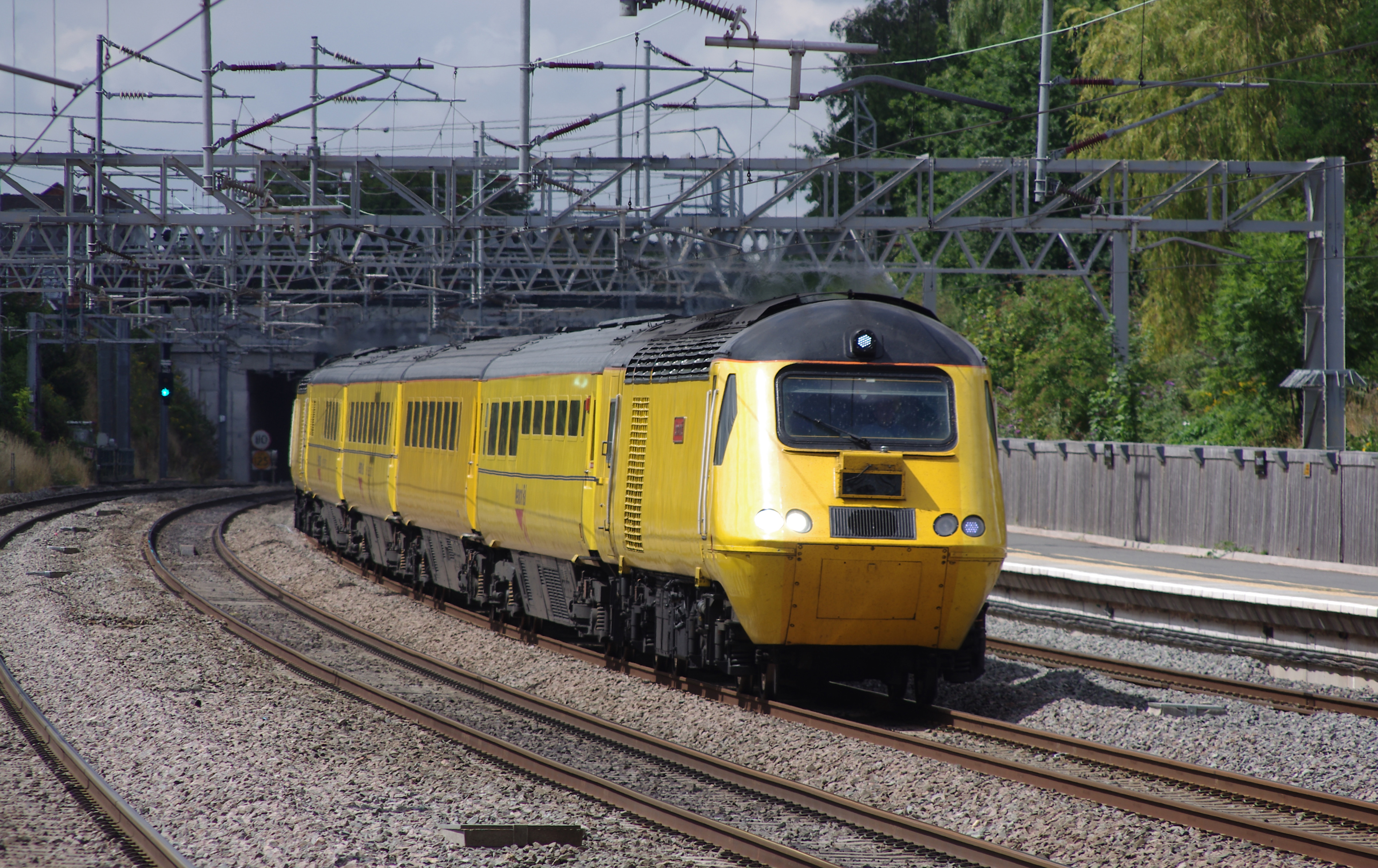
New Measurement Train

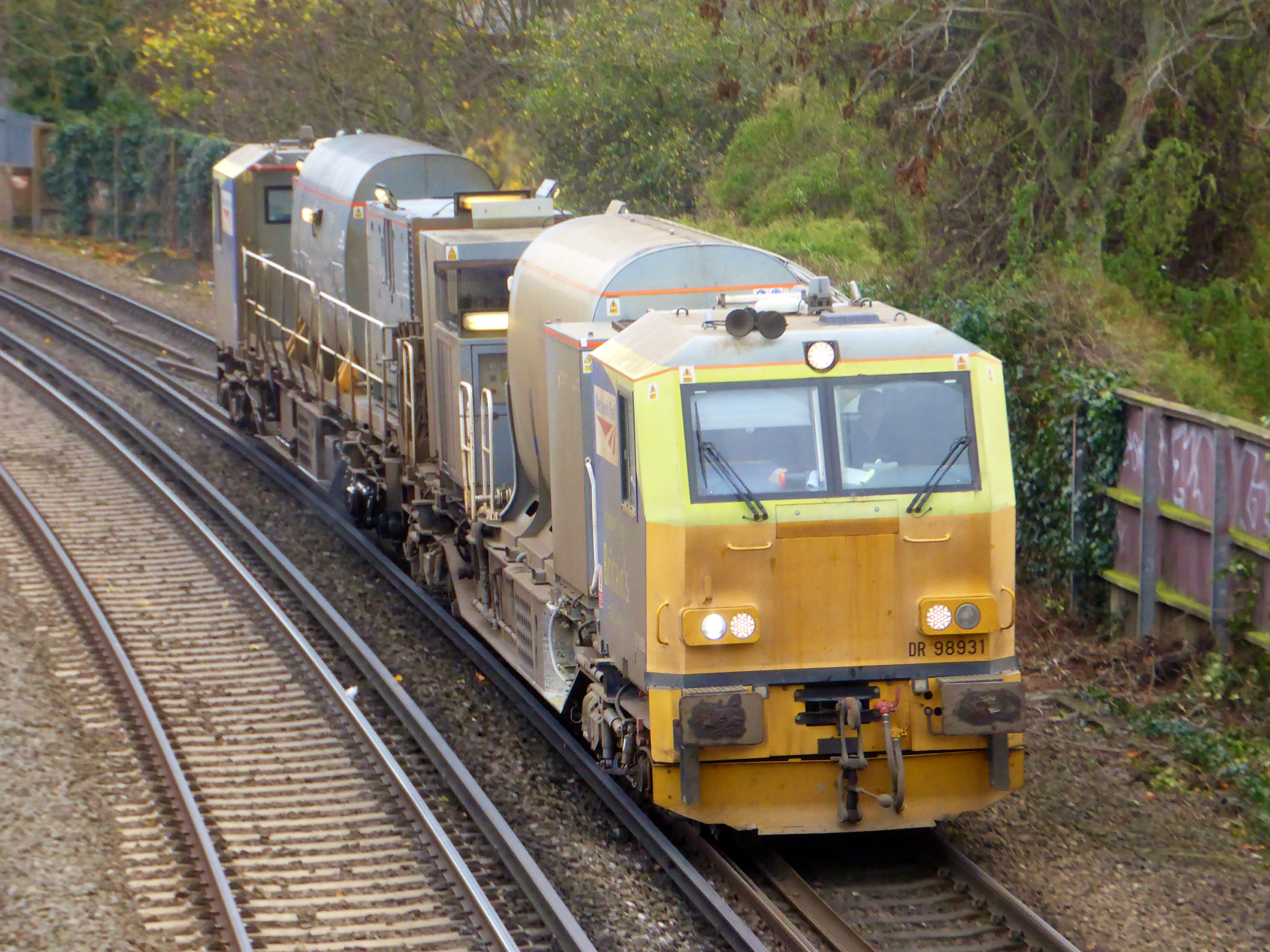
Railhead treatment train

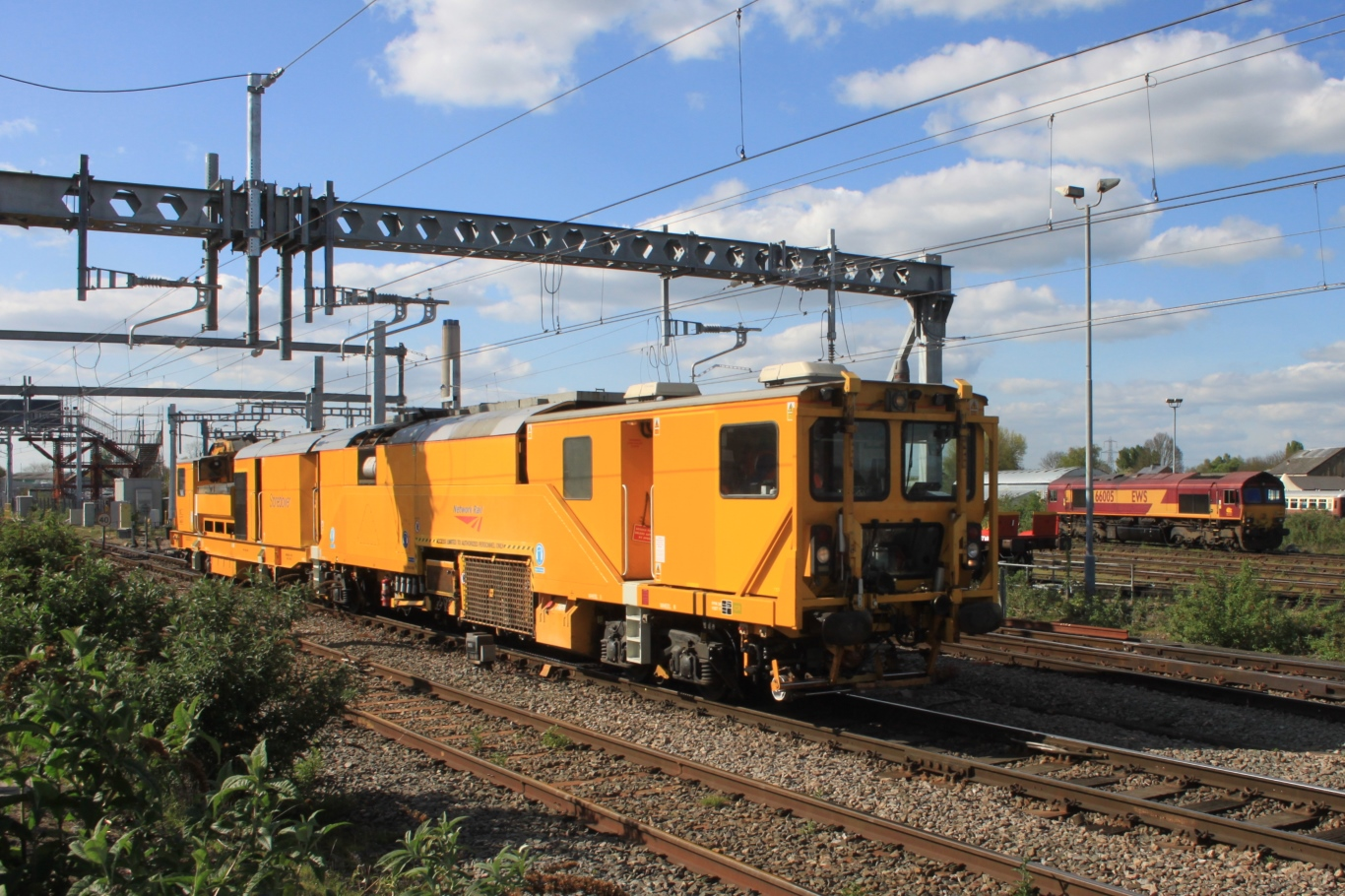
Stoneblower at Didcot

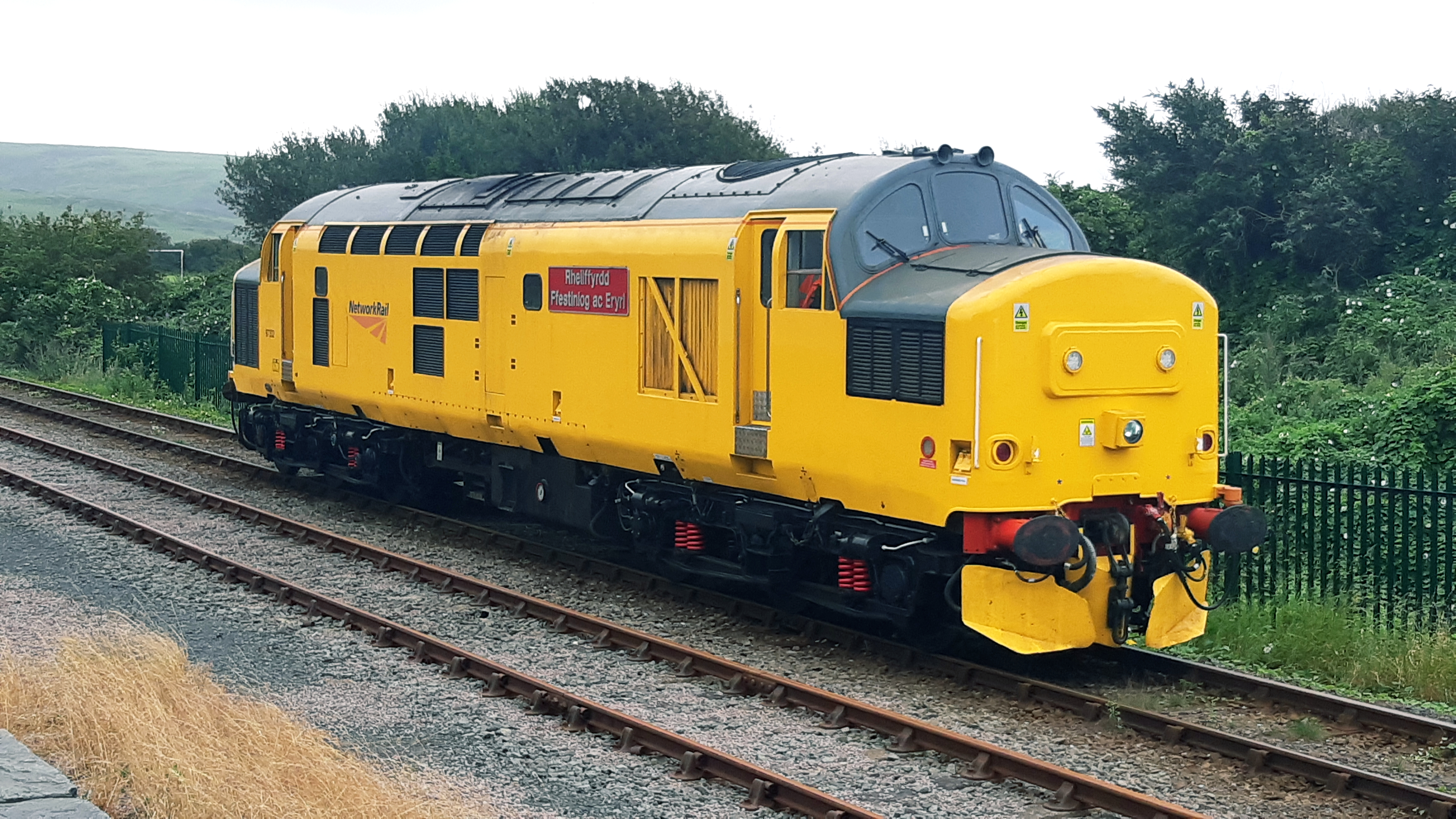
Class 97/3 Locomotive for ERTMS Testing purposes.

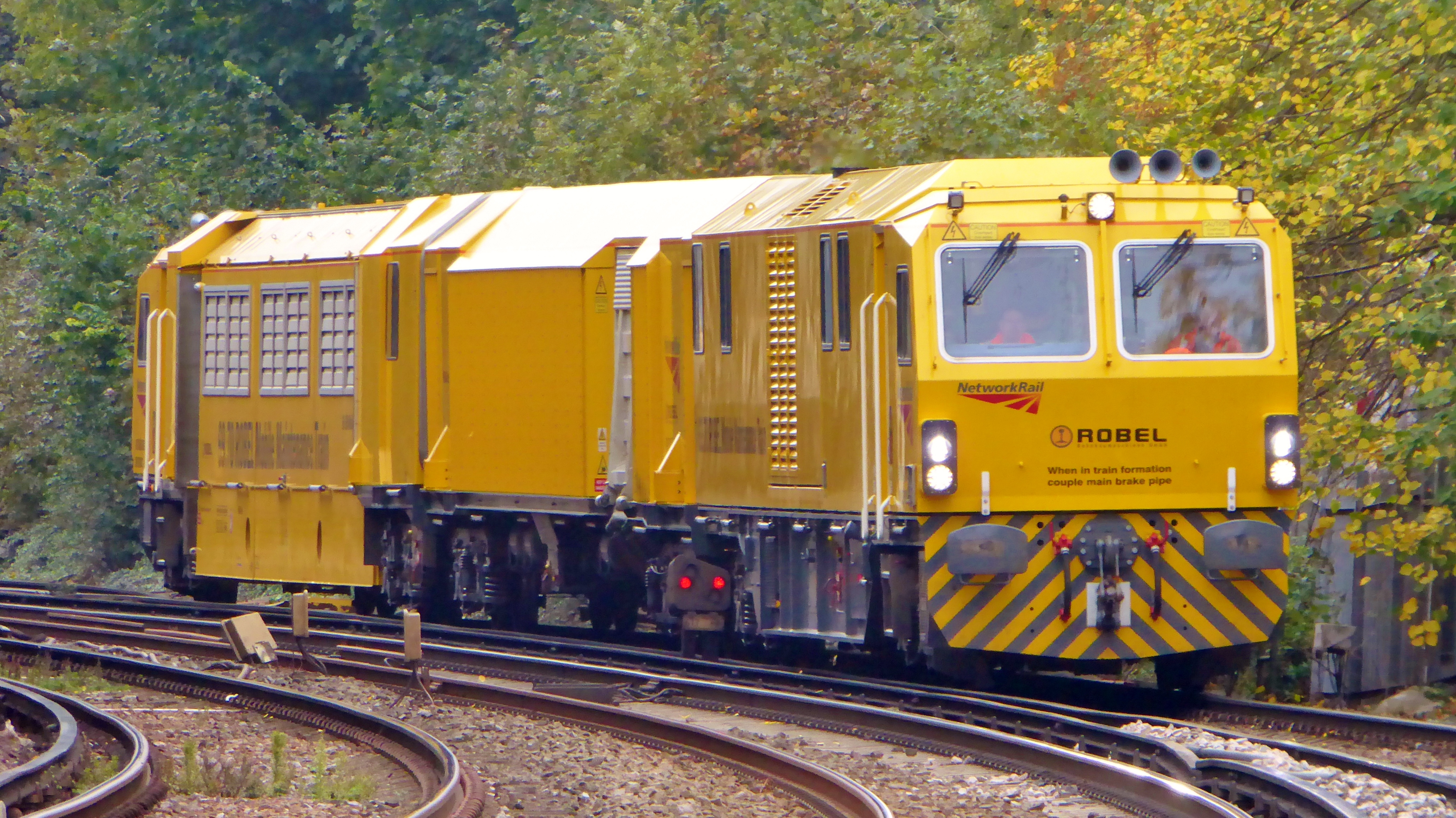
Mobile Maintenance Train

== Development ==
=== Current investment programme ===
Rail Passengers in Great Britain from 1829 to 2021, showing the early era of small railway companies, the amalgamation into the "Big Four", nationalisation and finally the current era of privatisation.

From 1997 to 2014 (inclusive), passenger numbers have more than doubled, following little growth in the previous decades. To cope with the increasing passenger numbers, Network Rail is currently undertaking a £38 billion programme of upgrades to the network, including Crossrail, electrification of lines, in-cab signalling, new inter-city trains, upgrading Thameslink, and a new high-speed line.

=== The GRIP process ===
For investment projects, as opposed to routine maintenance, Network Rail has developed an eight-stage process designed to minimise and mitigate risks. This is known as the Governance for Railway Investment Projects (GRIP), previously known as “Guide to Rail Investment Projects”. The stages are as follows:

1. output definition;
2. pre-feasibility;
3. option selection;
4. single option development;
5. detailed design;
6. construction, test and commission;
7. scheme hand back;
8. project close out.

Each stage delivers an agreed set of outputs to defined quality criteria. The process has been criticised as cumbersome by some and it is proposed to replace it with a new process with the acronym PACE- Project Acceleration in a Controlled Environment.

=== Control periods ===
For financial and other planning purposes, Network Rail works within 5-year "Control Periods", each one beginning on 1 April and ending on 31 March to coincide with the financial reporting year. These periods were inherited from Railtrack, so that the earlier ones are retrospective, and not necessarily of 5 years duration. They are as follows:

- Control Period 1 (CP1): 1995–1999
- Control Period 2 (CP2): 1999–2004
- Control Period 3 (CP3): 2004–2009
- Control Period 4 (CP4): 2009–2014
- Control Period 5 (CP5): 2014–2019
- Control Period 6 (CP6): 2019–2024
- Control Period 7 (CP7): 2024–2029
- Control Period 8 (CP8): 2029–2034

The Secretary of State for Transport regularly issues a High-Level Output Specification (HLOS) indicating what work the Government wishes to be undertaken during a given Control Period.

=== Route plans ===
Strategic Routes in England and Wales 2014.

Network Rail regularly publishes a Strategic Business Plan detailing their policies, processes and plans, as well as financial expenditure and other data. The most recent complete business plan was published in January 2013. Within these plans the rail network is divided into ten "devolved routes" or "operational routes", with a Route Plan for each being published annually. Each route or other plan covers a number of railway lines usually defined by geographical area and the routes are further subdivided into 17 "strategic routes", each divided into Strategic Route Sections (SRS) and given an SRS number and name. The plans also detail the geography of routes, stations, major junctions, capacity constraints and other issues and provide data on freight gauge, electrification, line speed, number of tracks, capacity and other information. The plans also detail the expected future demand and development of each route, their predicted expenditure and their maintenance and investment requirements.

The devolved routes were introduced in 2011, and the 17 strategic routes labelled "A" to "Q" were introduced in 2010. From 2004 to 2009, the network had been divided into 26 strategic routes numbered "1" to "26". In 2003, the network had been divided into 41 strategic routes numbered "1" to "41".

The 2011 devolved routes and strategic routes are organised as in the table below.

Devolved Route	Strategic route		Primary routes	Other destinations	Former strategic routes 2004–2009
South East	A	Kent and High Speed One	London Charing Cross – Ashford International; London St Pancras International – Channel Tunnel	Canterbury East; Dover Priory; Folkestone Central; Hastings; London Bridge; London Cannon Street; Maidstone East; Margate; Rochester; Sevenoaks; Tonbridge	1. Kent
South East	B	Sussex	London Victoria – Brighton	Chichester; Clapham Junction; Dorking; Eastbourne; London Blackfriars; London Bridge; London St Pancras International; Redhill	2. Brighton Main Line & Sussex
Wessex	C	Wessex	London Waterloo – Southampton Central	Ascot; Basingstoke; Bournemouth; Clapham Junction; Dorchester South; Exeter St Davids; Guildford; Kew Bridge; Poole; Portsmouth Harbour; Salisbury; Shanklin; Shepperton; Staines; Weymouth; Windsor & Eton Riverside; Woking	3. South West Main Line; 4. Wessex Routes
Anglia	D	East Anglia	London Liverpool Street – Norwich	Cambridge; Ely; Felixstowe; Great Yarmouth; Lowestoft; Harwich Town; Ipswich; Kings Lynn; Southend Victoria	5. West Anglia; 7. Great Eastern
Anglia	E	North London Line	none	Barking; Gospel Oak; Richmond; Stratford	6. North London Line and Thameside (part)
Anglia	F	Thameside	none	Fenchurch Street; Shoeburyness; Southend Central	6. North London Line and Thameside (part)
London North Eastern and East Midland	G	East Coast Main Line and North East	London King's Cross – Leeds and Edinburgh Waverley	Doncaster; Durham; Lincoln Central; Newcastle; Peterborough; Whitby; York	8. East Coast Main Line; 9. North East Routes (part); 11. South Cross-Pennine, South Yorkshire and Lincolnshire (part)
London North Eastern and East Midland	H	Cross-Pennine, Yorkshire & Humber and North West (East section)	Chesterfield – Barnetby	Barnsley; Bradford Interchange; Huddersfield; Hull; Leeds; Scarborough; Sheffield; Skipton; York	9. North East Routes (part); 10. North Cross-Pennine, North and West Yorkshire; 11. South Cross-Pennine, South Yorkshire and Lincolnshire (part)
London North Eastern and East Midland	I	East Midlands	London St Pancras International – Nottingham, Sheffield, Chesterfield; Burton-on-Trent – Derby	Bedford; Leicester; Matlock; Skegness	19. Midland Main Line and East Midlands
Western	J	London and West	London Paddington – Oxford, Bristol Parkway, Severn Tunnel, Taunton	Heathrow Central; Heathrow Terminal 4; Newbury; Reading; Didcot Parkway; South Ruislip; Swindon; Windsor & Eton Central	12. Reading to Penzance (part); 13. Great Western Main Line (part)
Western	K	West of England	Swindon – Bristol Temple Meads; Bristol Parkway – Plymouth; Bristol Temple Meads – Cheltenham Spa	Barnstaple; Bath Spa; Exeter St Davids; Gloucester; Penzance; Taunton	12. Reading to Penzance (part); 13. Great Western Main Line (part)
Wales	L	Wales	Severn Tunnel – Swansea	Aberdare; Aberystwyth; Bangor; Blaenau Ffestiniog; Caerphilly; Cardiff Central; Carmarthen; Crewe; Fishguard Harbour; Gloucester; Hereford; Holyhead; Llandudno; Merthyr Tydfil; Milford Haven; Newport; Pembroke Dock; Port Talbot Parkway; Pwllheli; Rhyl; Rhymney; Shrewsbury; Tenby; Treherbert; Wrexham General	13. Great Western Main Line (part); 14. South and Central Wales and Borders; 15. South Wales Valleys; 22. North Wales and Borders
London North Western	H	Cross-Pennine, Yorkshire & Humber and North West (West section)	Crewe – Manchester Piccadilly; Liverpool South Parkway – Liverpool Lime Street	Barrow-in-Furness; Blackburn; Blackpool North; Bolton; Burnley Central; Buxton; Carlisle; Colne; Lancaster; Manchester Victoria; Morecambe; Preston; Settle; Southport; Todmorden; Warrington Central; Wigan Wallgate; Windermere	20. North West Urban; 23. North West Rural
London North Western	M	West Midlands and Chilterns	Birmingham New Street – Oxford, Cheltenham Spa, Rugby, Burton-on-Trent and Stafford	Banbury; Bicester Village; Coventry; High Wycombe; Kidderminster; London Marylebone; Nuneaton; Stratford-upon-Avon; Warwick; Wolverhampton; Worcester Foregate Street	16. Chilterns; 17. West Midlands
London North Western	N	West Coast Main Line	London Euston – Liverpool South Parkway, Cheadle Hulme & Carstairs	Bedford St Johns; Bletchley; Carlisle; Chester; Crewe; Lancaster; Macclesfield; Milton Keynes Central; Northampton; Preston; Rugby; Runcorn; St Albans Abbey; Stafford; Stoke-on-Trent; Warrington Bank Quay; Wigan North Western	18. West Coast Main Line
London North Western	O	Merseyside	none	Chester; Ellesmere Port; Kirkby; Liverpool Central; Liverpool Lime Street; Liverpool South Parkway; New Brighton; Ormskirk; Southport; West Kirby	21. Merseyrail
Scotland	P	Scotland East	Edinburgh Waverley – Carstairs & Falkirk High	Aberdeen; Dundee; Glasgow Queen Street High Level; Inverness; Kyle of Lochalsh; Stirling; Thurso; Wick	24. East of Scotland; 25. Highlands (part)
Scotland	Q	Scotland West	Carstairs – Glasgow Central	Ardrossan Harbour; Ayr; Dumbarton Central; Dumfries; Fort William; Glasgow Queen Street Low Level; Greenock Central; Helensburgh Central; Largs; Mallaig; Oban; Stranraer	25. Highlands (part); 26. Strathclyde and South West Scotland

== Governance structure and accountability ==
=== Formal governance structure ===
The company is accountable to a body of members through its corporate constitution, to its commercial train operator customers through its contracts with them (the contracts are subject to regulatory oversight), and to the public interest through the statutory powers of the Office of Rail and Road (ORR).

Since Network Rail does not have shareholders, its members hold the board of directors to account for their management of the business. From 1 July 2015 all the members were removed leaving the special member, the Secretary of State for Transport, as the sole member of Network Rail.

Previously at any one time there were around 100 members in total, drawn from a wide range of industry partners and members of the public. There were two general categories of membership, industry members comprising any organisation holding a licence to operate on the railway or preferred bidder for a railway franchise, and public members who were drawn from the wider stakeholder community. Members were appointed by an independent panel and served a three-year term. They had a number of statutory rights and duties which included attending annual general meetings, receiving the Annual Report and Accounts, and approving the appointment or re-appointment of Network Rail's directors. Members had a duty to act in the best interests of the company without personal bias. They received no payments other than travel expenses.

Setting the strategic direction and the day-to-day management of Network Rail is the responsibility of the company's board of directors. That direction must be consistent with the regulatory jurisdiction of the ORR, and with the requirements of its contracts. The ORR in turn operates within the overall transport policy set by the UK Department for Transport and the Scottish government, including as to what the government wants the railway industry to achieve and how much money the government is prepared to put into the industry. This means that the degree of government influence and control over the company is higher than it was before these enlargements of the powers and role of the government were introduced by the Railways Act 2005.

The board of Network Rail are:

- Chair – Richard George
- Chief executive officer – Jeremy Westlake
- Chief financial officer – Paul Marshall

=== Monitoring Network Rail's performance ===
The Office of Rail and Road (ORR) monitors Network Rail's performance on a continuous basis against targets established by the regulatory authority in the most recent access charges review (2003), against obligations in the company's network licence and against forecasts in its own business plan. If performance is poor, the company will face criticism and possible enforcement action from its commercial customers (under their contracts) and from the ORR (enforcing the company's network licence). It may also be criticised by its members in general meeting.

In the annual report 2014/15, the ORR reported that the Public Performance Measure (PPM) was 89.6%, 1.4 percentage points (pp) below target in England and Wales, and PPM in Scotland was 90.5%, 1.5pp below its regulatory performance target of 92%.

=== Informal governance groups ===
==== Railway Industry Planning Group (RIPG) ====
The Railway Industry Planning Group (RIPG), chaired by Network Rail, seeks to secure railway industry input into the structure and development of the national railway strategic planning processes. Its members are drawn from railway funders, operators and users, and the group meets quarterly to consider:

- rail industry liaison with regional and local government
- Regional (and Scotland and Wales) Planning Assessments
- Route Utilisation Strategies
- specification of passenger operator franchises
- High Level Output Specifications and Network Rail's Strategic Business Plan
- Network Rail's Business Planning Criteria, Business Plan and Route Plans.

== Safety ==
2013 Rail fatalities per billion passenger-km in European countries.

While generally good, the safety record of the company was marred in February 2007 when a Virgin express derailed at Grayrigg in Cumbria. Network Rail admitted responsibility for the incident. The RAIB investigation concluded in 2009 that a faulty set of points had caused the derailment. In 2012 the Office of Rail Regulation announced that Network Rail was to be prosecuted under the Health and Safety at Work etc. Act 1974 for "failure to provide and implement suitable and sufficient standards, procedures, guidance, training, tools and resources for the inspection and maintenance of fixed stretcher bar points". Network Rail pleaded guilty and were fined £4.1 million including legal costs.

In December 2005, two young girls were killed by a train as they were crossing the railway line via a pedestrian level crossing at Elsenham in Essex. Network Rail was prosecuted for breaching health and safety law and fined £1 million in March 2012. The court heard that risk assessments carried out by Network Rail staff in 2002 had identified potential dangers with the crossing and recommended the installation of gates that would lock automatically as trains approached, but this was not acted upon.

Many track safety initiatives have been introduced in the time Network Rail has been operational. One high-profile measure, announced in December 2008, known as "All Orange", states that all track personnel must not only wear orange hi-vis waistcoats or jackets, but must also wear orange hi-vis trousers at all times when working on or near the track. This ruling came into force in January 2009 for maintenance and property workers and in April 2009 for infrastructure and investment sites.

All workers working on or near the line or trackside have to pass a medical assessment and a drug and alcohol test. They must also sit a Personal Track Safety training course and undergo assessment to be issued with a PTS card (reassessment is required every two years). Network Rail workers undergo periodic assessments as part of the Skills Assessment Scheme, formerly called the AITL process (Assessment in the Line). This requires each worker to go through questions on a computer based program on all the competencies held.

== Private versus public-sector status ==
In 2001, the Labour government denied that it had nationalised the rail network in order to prevent Railtrack's shareholders claiming, via the European Court of Human Rights, the four-year average price of Railtrack, about £10 per share. Instead, Railtrack's shareholders were given only £2.60. The Times reported that Gordon Brown's aide, Shriti Vadera e-mailed Stephen Byers in July 2001 asking: "Can we engineer the solution through insolvency ... and therefore avoid compensation under the Human Rights Act?"

Railtrack plc was placed into railway administration under the Railways Act 1993 on 7 October 2001, following an application to the High Court by the then Transport Secretary, Stephen Byers. It was reported in November 2001 that a further £3.5 billion might be needed to keep the national railway network running, a sum disputed by Railtrack. To get Railtrack out of administration, the government had to return to the High Court and present evidence that the company was no longer insolvent. The principal reason given by the government to the court for this assertion was the decision of the Rail Regulator in September 2002 to carry out an interim review of the company's finances, with the potential to advance significant additional sums to the company. The High Court accepted that the company was not insolvent, and the railway administration order was discharged on 3 October 2002.

Until 2013, there was discussion over whether Network Rail should be classified as a public-sector or a private-sector entity. Although it was officially a private sector organisation, the fact that its debts were underwritten by the government, and it was partly funded by the government, led to the description of "nationalisation in all but name". It was also claimed that the government did not want Network Rail to be classified as a public-sector organisation, as this would mean that the company's debt would be counted as public expenditure liabilities. The Office for National Statistics (ONS) repeatedly clashed with the National Audit Office and the Statistics Commission over whether the successor to Railtrack should be considered a private company – as the ONS believed – or included on the Government's books, as the National Audit Office argued. The NAO said that as the Government was bearing the risk that would normally be borne by equity capital, and as it could appoint, through the SRA, a director who could not be removed by members, Network Rail was effectively a subsidiary of the government-controlled SRA.

In December 2013, the ONS announced that, under the updated criteria of the 2010 version of the European System of Accounts, Network Rail would be reclassified as a "central government body" from 1 September 2014, and that this reclassification would apply retroactively from 1 April 2004. As a result, the company's debt of £34 billion was added to the national debt. In the 2016–17 financial year, Network Rail's net debt rose from £41.6 billion to £46.3 billion.

== Photography competition ==
Network Rail organises the Landscape Photographer of the Year competition. Shortlisted photos are displayed at London Waterloo and other major stations.

== See also ==
- Campaign to Bring Back British Rail
- NI Railways
- Financing of the rail industry in Great Britain
- Network Rail Certification Body
