= UK Notified Bodies =

UK Notified Bodies (UK NoBos) are UK bodies authorised to assess the compatibility of works or equipment with Technical Specifications for Interoperability (TSI) as part of the system to effectively and safely allow the interoperability of railway services within the European Union.

UK Notified Bodies may be appointed by ministers of HM Government under The Railways (Interoperability) (Notified Bodies) Regulations 2000 (S.I. 2000/1674) in six railway TSI areas: Control Command and Signalling, Energy, Infrastructure, Maintenance, Operations and Rolling Stock. The European Railway Agency maintains a list of TSIs and their status.

The UK Department for Transport publishes a list of Notified Bodies.

Notified Bodies are accredited by UKAS to operate under a schedule covering the TSIs.
